= Oria (singer) =

French singer

- Oria in 2026

Background information
- Born: Nice, France
- Genres: Pop music; oriental music
- Occupation: Singer

Oria is a French singer. She is best known for her 2025 single Soirée mondaine. Her single achieved certified platinum in France by SNEP on 24 September 2026.

Oria was born in Nice. Her father is of Corsica and Algerian descent, and her mother is from Tunisia. According to La Provence, she worked as a waitress in Cannes. She posted covers of French songs on numerous social media platforms, and garnered over 600,000 followers on TikTok.
