= Nice =

Prefecture of Alpes-Maritimes, Southern France

Nice Niça (Occitan)
- Prefecture and commune
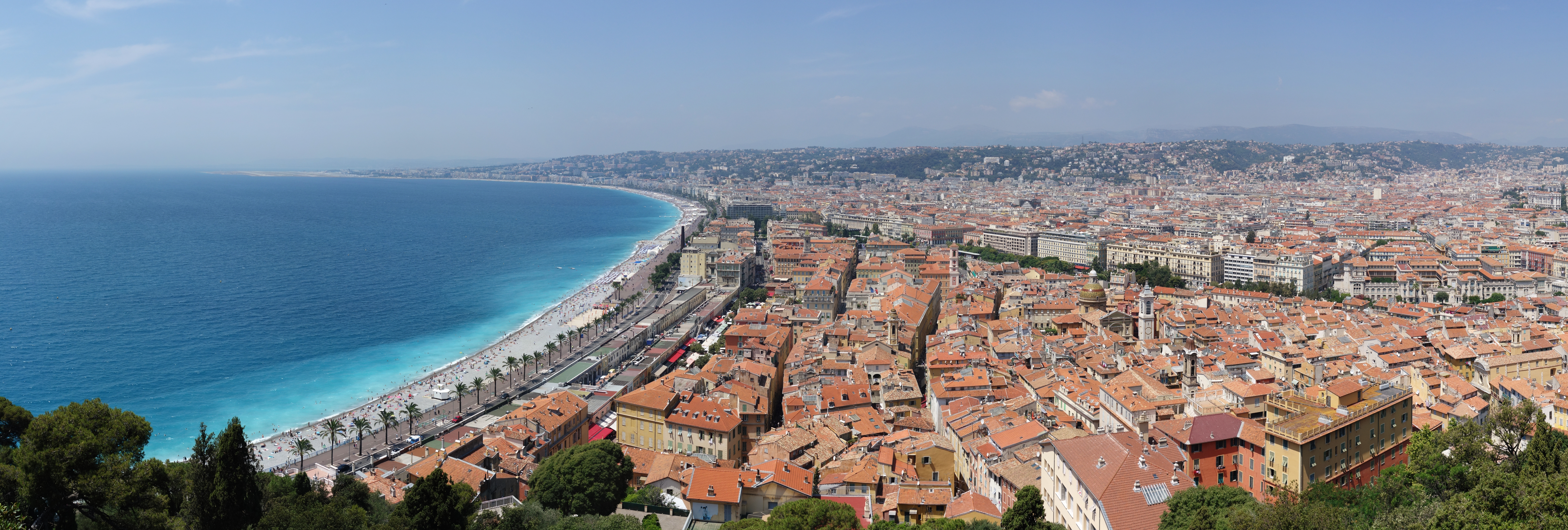
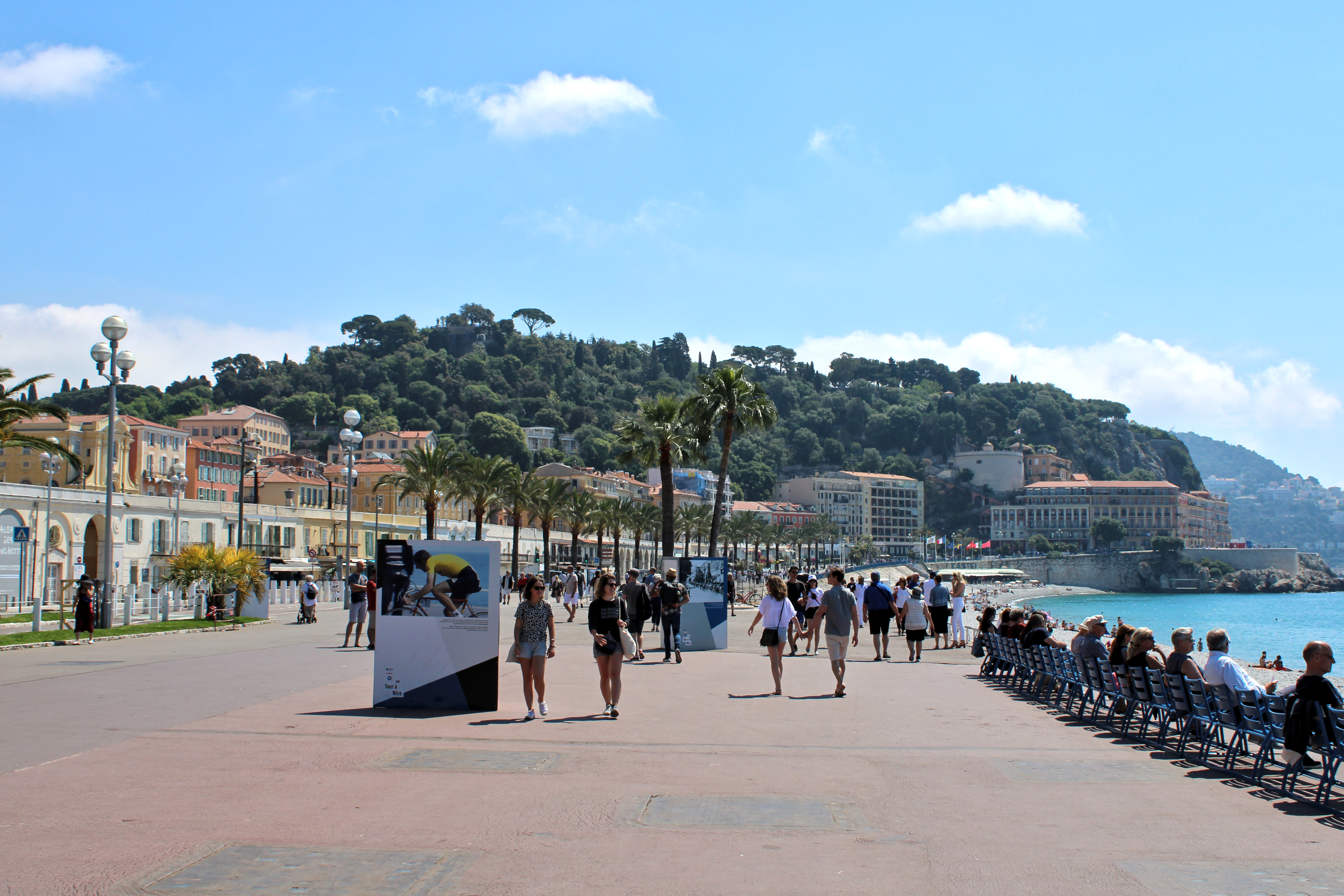
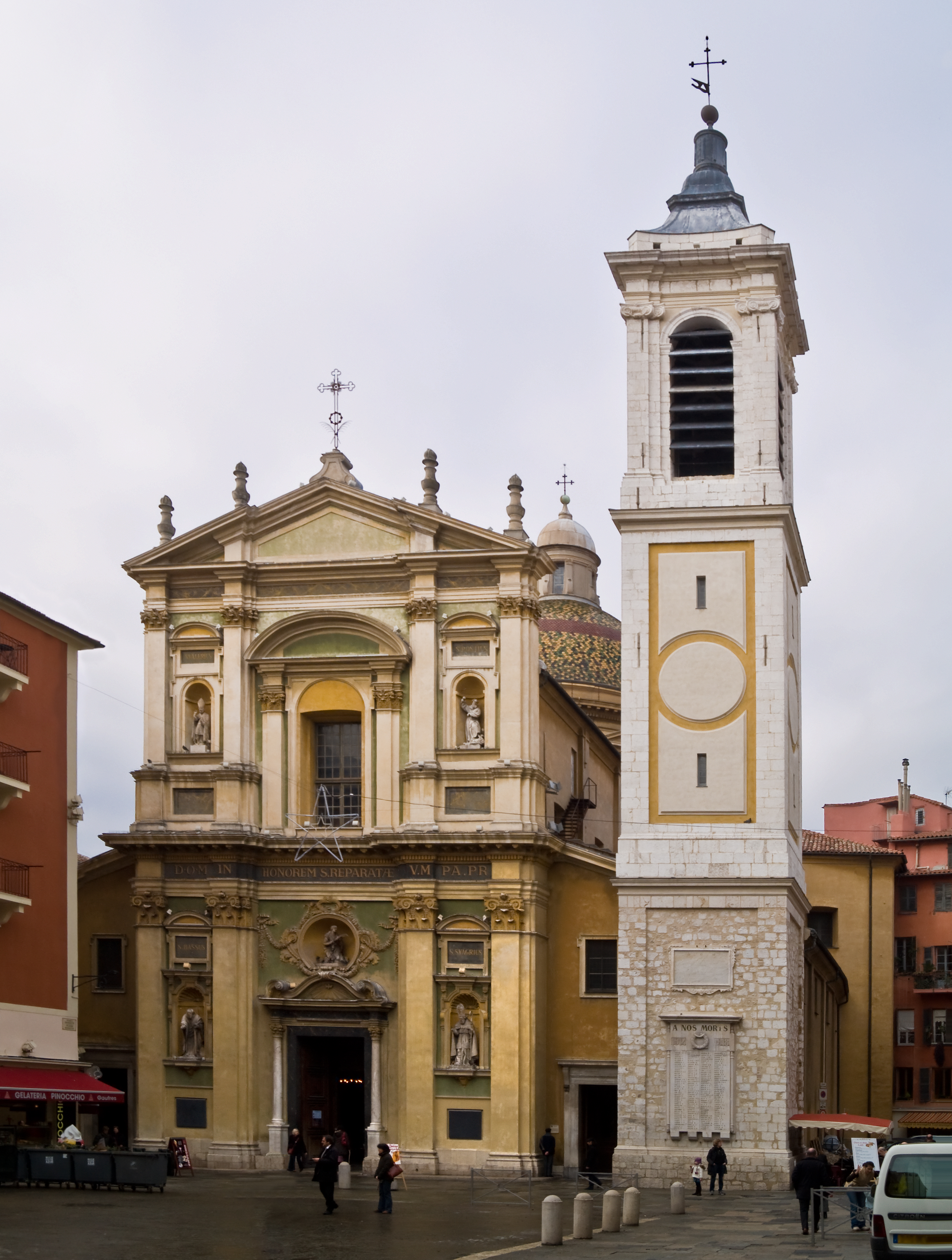
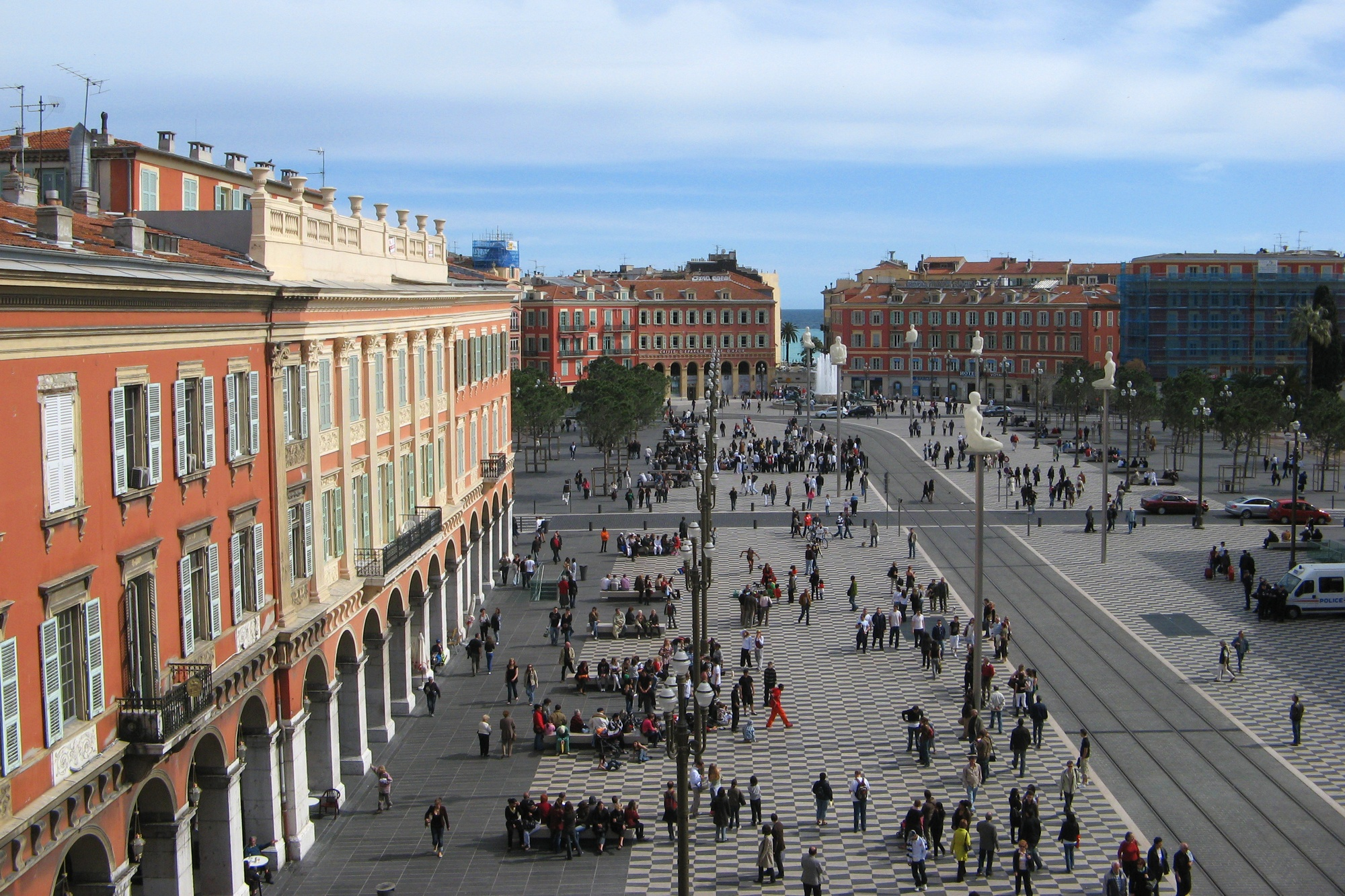
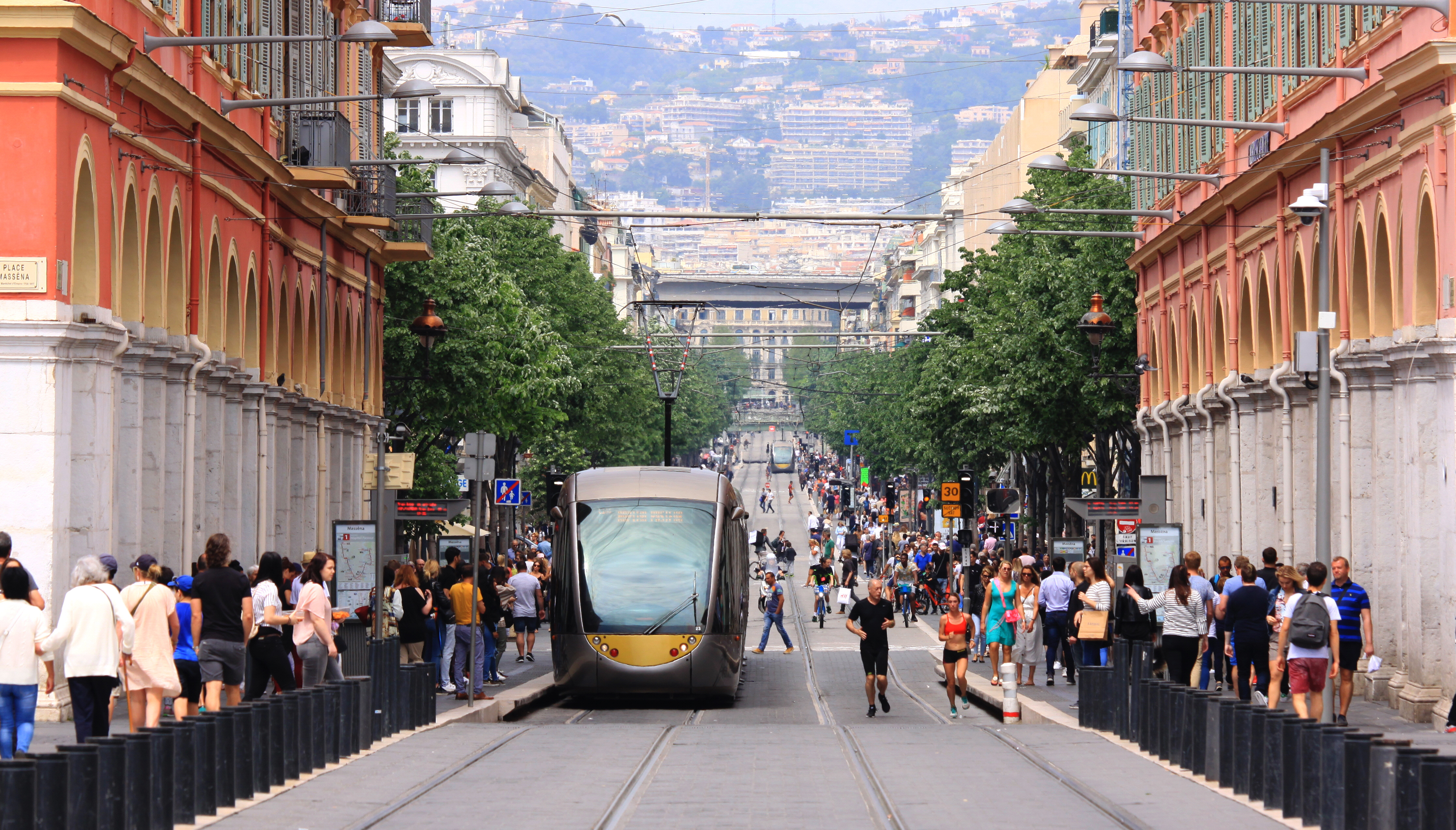
- Cityscape Promenade des Anglais Nice Cathedral Place Masséna Avenue Jean Médecin

- Flag Coat of arms
- Motto(s): Nicæa civitas fidelissima (Latin: Nice, most loyal city)
- Location of Nice
- Location within France Location within Provence-Alpes-Côte d'Azur
- Coordinates: 43°42′12″N 7°15′59″E
- Country: France
- Region: Provence-Alpes-Côte d'Azur
- Department: Alpes-Maritimes
- Arrondissement: Nice
- Canton: Nice-1, 2, 3, 4, 5, 6, 7, 8, and 9
- Intercommunality: Métropole Nice Côte d'Azur

Government
  - Mayor (2026–32): Éric Ciotti (UDR)
- Area^{1}: 71.92 km^{2} (27.77 sq mi)
  - Urban: 743.6 km^{2} (287.1 sq mi)
  - Metro: 2,073 km^{2} (800 sq mi)
- Population (2023): 357,737
  - Rank: 5th in France
  - Density: 4,974/km^{2} (12,880/sq mi)
  - Urban (2023): 987,709
  - Urban density: 1,328/km^{2} (3,440/sq mi)
  - Metro (2023): 641,721
  - Metro density: 309.6/km^{2} (801.8/sq mi)
- Demonym(s): Niçois (m); Niçoise (f)
- Time zone: UTC+01:00 (CET)
  - Summer (DST): UTC+02:00 (CEST)
- INSEE/Postal code: 06088 /
- Website: www.nice.fr

UNESCO World Heritage Site
- Official name: Nice, Winter Resort Town of the Riviera
- Criteria: Cultural: ii
- Reference: 1635
- Inscription: 2021 (44th Session)
- ^{1} French Land Register data, which excludes lakes, ponds, glaciers > 1 km^{2} (0.386 sq mi or 247 acres) and river estuaries.

Nice (Note: /niːs/ NEESS; French pronunciation: [nis]) (Note: Niçard Occitan: Niça, classical norm, or Nissa, Mistralian norm, pronounced [ˈnisa]; Italian: Nizza [ˈnittsa]; Ligurian: Nissa; Ancient Greek: Νίκαια; Latin: Nicaea) is a city and commune, and the prefecture of the department of Alpes-Maritimes, and the administrative region of Provence-Alpes-Côte d'Azur, France. It is located on the French Riviera, the country's southeastern coast on the Mediterranean Sea, at the foot of the French Alps. It was the capital city of the historical County of Nice (French: Comté de Nice, Niçard: Countèa de Nissa).

Nice is located approximately 13 kilometres (8 mi) west of the principality of Monaco and 30 kilometres (19 mi) west of the French–Italian border. It is the second most populated French city on the Mediterranean coast after Marseille. The Nice agglomeration extends beyond the administrative city limits, with a population of nearly one million over an area of approximately 744 km^{2} (287 sq mi)

The Nice agglomeration contains Terra Amata, an archaeological site which displays evidence of early use of fire 380,000 years ago. Around 350 BC, Greeks of Marseille founded a permanent settlement and called it Nikaia, after Nike, the goddess of victory. The town has changed hands many times. Its strategic location and port significantly contributed to its maritime strength. From 1388, it was a dominion of Savoy, then became part of the French First Republic between 1792 and 1815, when it was returned to the Kingdom of Piedmont-Sardinia, the legal predecessor of the Kingdom of Italy, until its annexation by France in 1860.

The natural environment of the Nice area and its mild Mediterranean climate came to the attention of the English upper classes in the second half of the 18th century, when an increasing number of aristocratic families began spending their winters there. In 1931, following its refurbishment, the city's main promenade, the Promenade des Anglais ("Walkway of the English"), was inaugurated by Prince Arthur, Duke of Connaught; it owes its name to visitors to the resort. These included Queen Victoria along with her son Edward VII who spent winters there.

The clear air and soft light have appealed to notable painters, such as Marc Chagall, Henri Matisse, Niki de Saint Phalle, and Arman. Their work is commemorated in the city's museums, including Musée Marc Chagall, Musée Matisse and Musée des Beaux-Arts. Frank Harris wrote several books, including his autobiography My Life and Loves, in Nice. Friedrich Nietzsche spent six consecutive winters in Nice, and wrote Thus Spoke Zarathustra there. Russian writer Anton Chekhov completed his play Three Sisters while living in Nice. Nice's appeal extended to the Russian upper classes. Prince Nicholas Alexandrovich, heir apparent to Imperial Russia, died in Nice and was a patron of the Russian Orthodox Cemetery, Nice where Princess Catherine Dolgorukova, morganatic wife of Tsar Alexander II of Russia, is buried. Also buried there are General Dmitry Shcherbachev and General Nikolai Yudenich leaders of the anti-Communist White movement. Those interred at the Cimetière du Château include celebrated jeweler Alfred Van Cleef, Emil Jellinek-Mercedes, founder of the Mercedes car company, poet Agathe-Sophie Sasserno, Asterix comics creator René Goscinny, The Phantom of the Opera author Gaston Leroux, French prime minister Léon Gambetta, and the first president of the International Court of Justice José Gustavo Guerrero.

The city is nicknamed Nice la Belle (Nissa La Bella in Niçard), meaning 'Nice the Beautiful', which is also the title of the unofficial anthem of Nice, written by Menica Rondelly. Because of its historical importance as a winter resort town for the European aristocracy and the resulting mix of cultures, UNESCO proclaimed Nice a World Heritage Site in 2021. The city has the second largest hotel capacity in the country, and is the second most visited metropolis in Metropolitan France, receiving four million tourists every year. The Nice Côte d'Azur Airport serves as a gateway to the French Riviera.

== History ==
=== Foundation ===
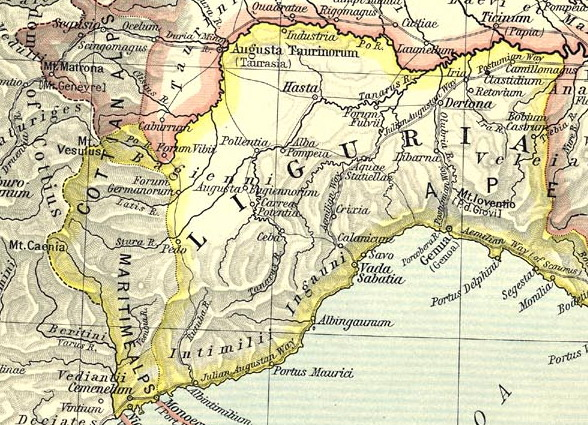
Nice in the Regio IX Liguria in Roman Italy

The first known hominid settlements in the Nice area date back about 400,000 years (Homo erectus); the Terra Amata archeological site shows one of the earliest uses of fire, construction of houses, as well as flint findings dated to around 230,000 years ago. Nice was probably founded around 350 BC by colonists from the Greek city of Phocaea in western Anatolia. It was given the name of Níkaia (Νίκαια) in honour of a victory over the neighbouring Ligurians (people from the northwest of Italy, probably the Vediantii kingdom); Nike (Νίκη) was the Greek goddess of victory. The city soon became one of the busiest trading ports on the Ligurian coast; but it had an important rival in the Roman town of Cemenelum, which continued to exist as a separate city until the time of the Lombard invasions. The ruins of Cemenelum are in Cimiez, now a district of Nice.

=== Early development ===
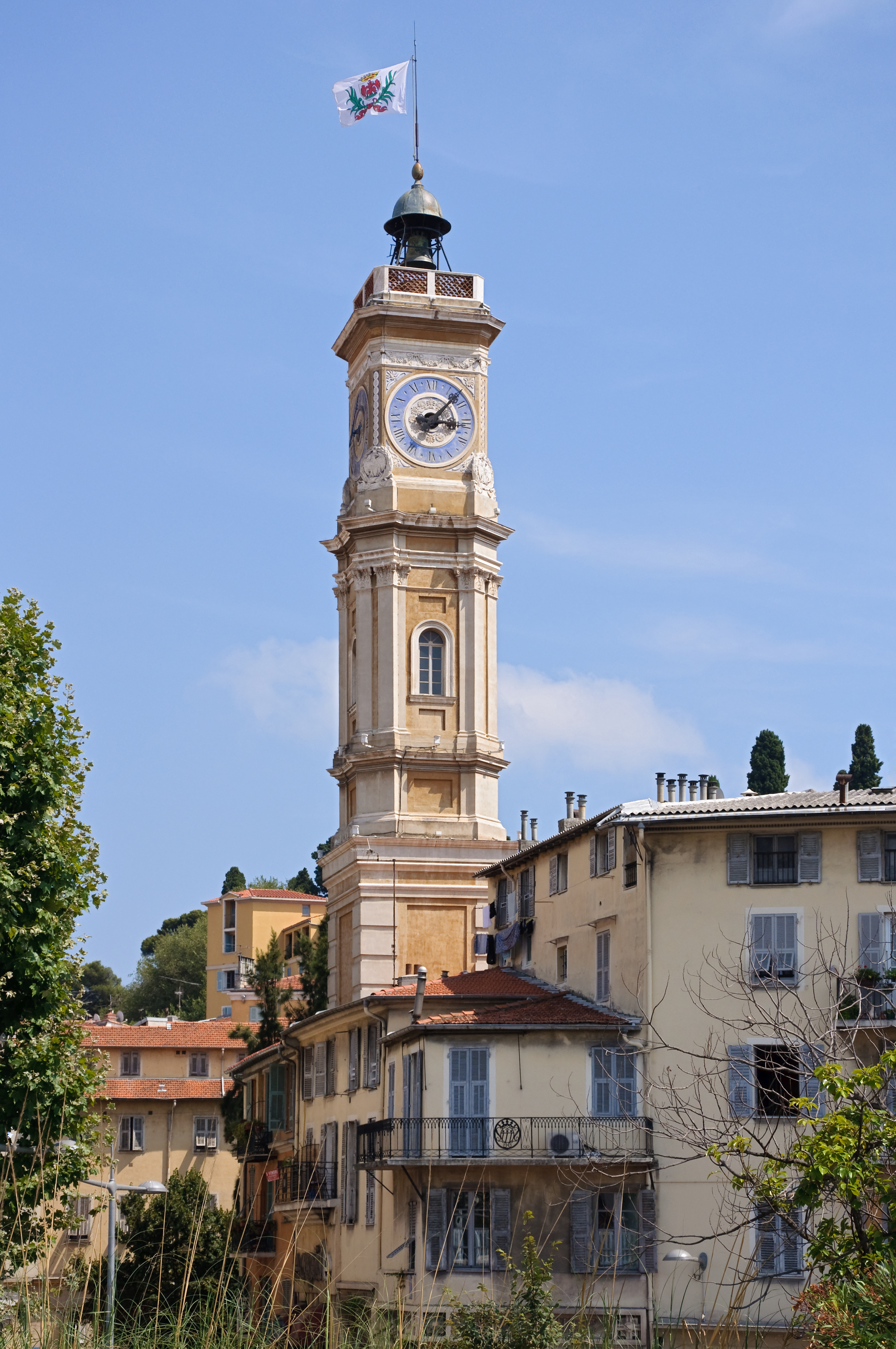
The Tower of St. François

In the 7th century, Nice joined the Genoese League formed by the towns of Liguria. In 729 the city repulsed the Saracens; but in 859 and again in 880 the Saracens pillaged and burned it, and for most of the 10th century remained masters of the surrounding country.

During the Middle Ages, Nice participated in the wars and history of Italy. As an ally of Pisa it was the enemy of Genoa, and both the King of France and the Holy Roman Emperor endeavoured to subjugate it; despite this, it maintained its municipal liberties. During the 13th and 14th centuries the city fell more than once into the hands of the Counts of Provence, but it regained its independence even though related to Genoa.

Duchy of Savoy (red) and other independent Italian states in 1494

The medieval city walls surrounded the Old Town. The landward side was protected by the River Paillon, which was later covered over and is now the tram route towards the Acropolis. The east side of the town was protected by fortifications on Castle Hill. Another river flowed into the port on the east side of Castle Hill. Engravings suggest that the port area was also defended by walls. Under Monoprix in Place de Garibaldi are excavated remains of a well-defended city gate on the main road from Turin.

=== Duchy of Savoy ===
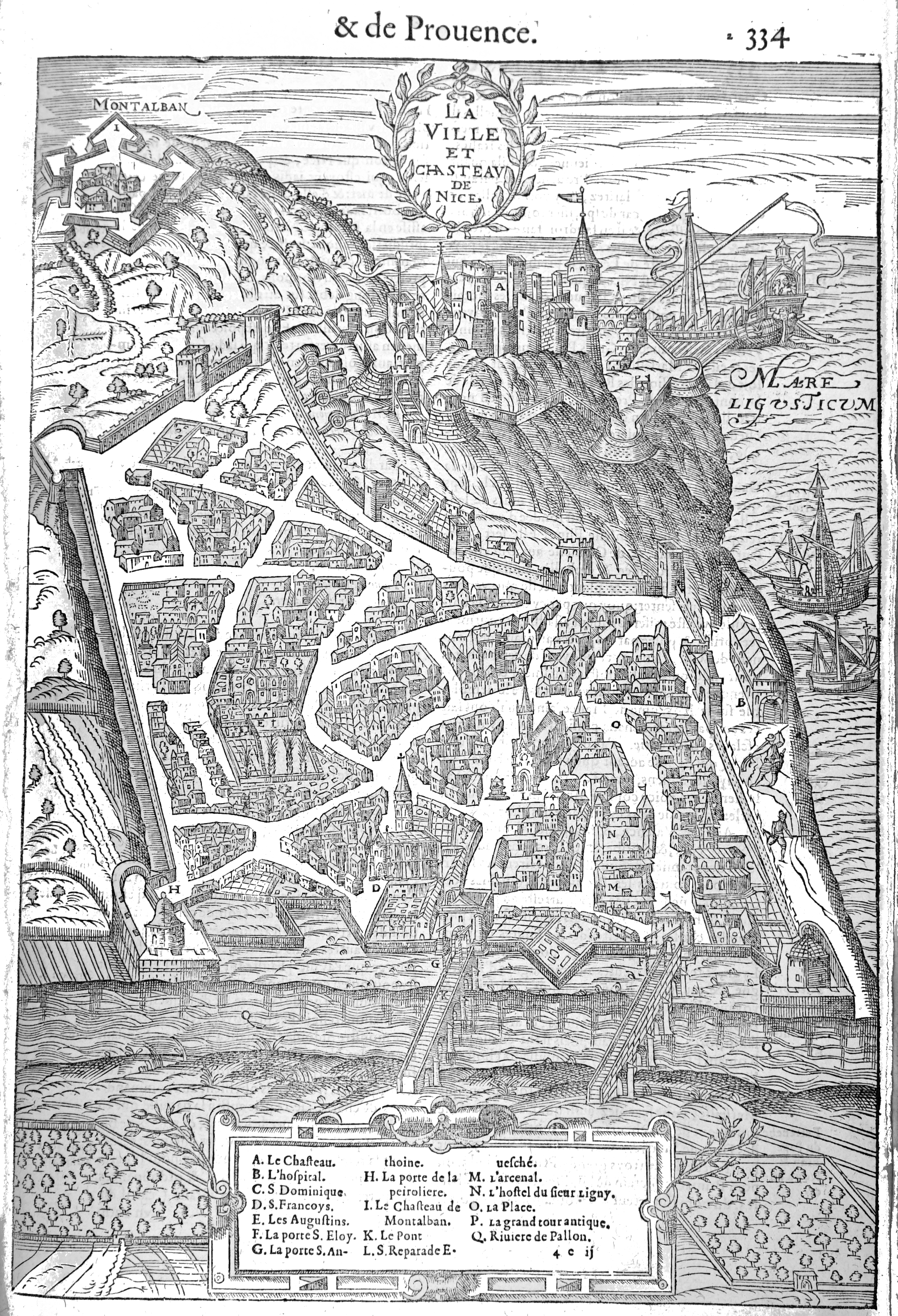
Nice in 1575

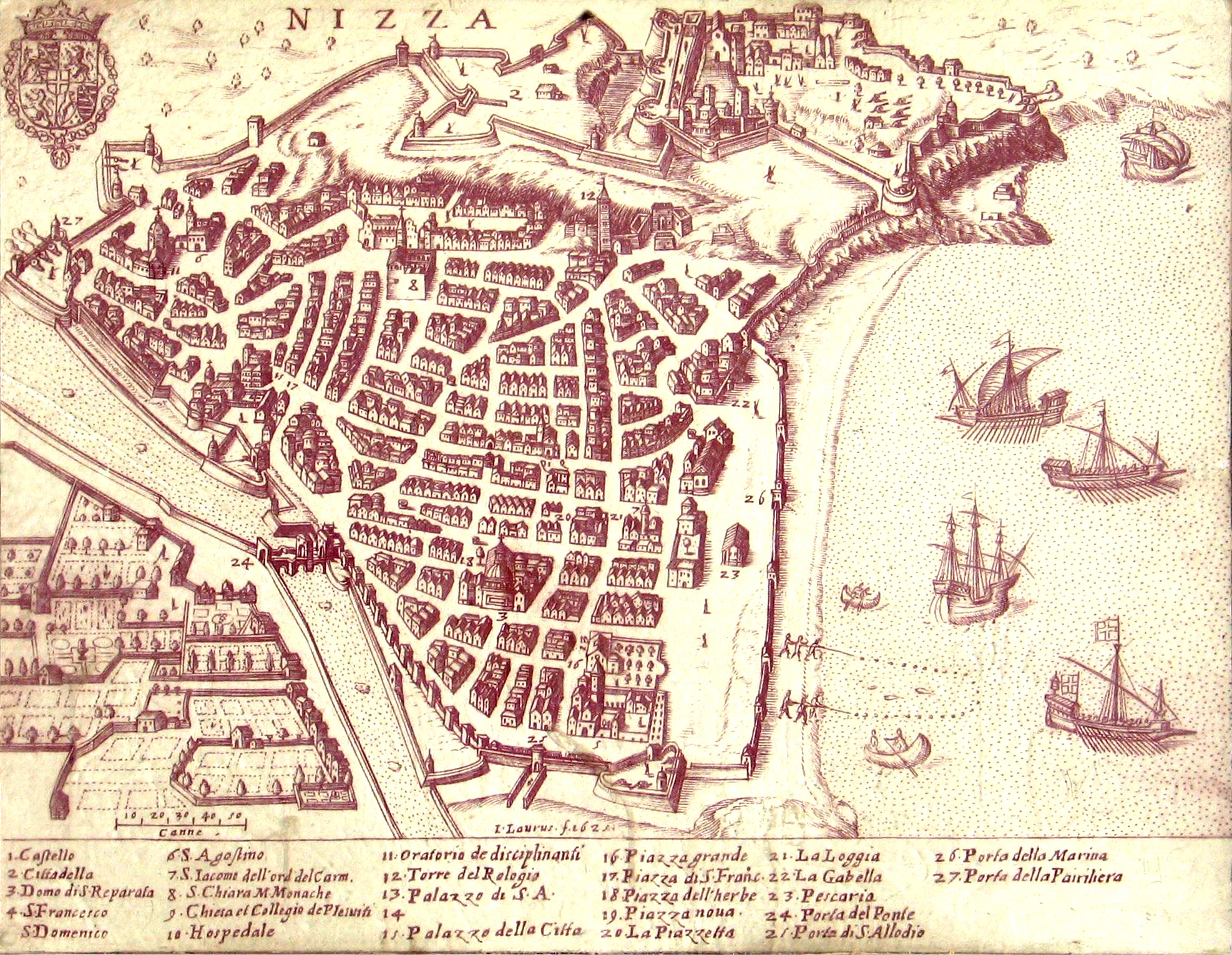
Nice in 1624

In 1388, the commune placed itself under the protection of the Counts of Savoy, thus becoming the County of Nice.

The maritime strength of Nice now rapidly increased until it was able to cope with the Barbary pirates; the fortifications were largely extended and the roads to the city improved. In 1561 Emmanuel Philibert, Duke of Savoy abolished the use of Latin as an administrative language and established the Italian language as the official language of government affairs in Nice.

During the struggle between Francis I and Charles V great damage was caused by the passage of the armies invading Provence; pestilence and famine raged in the city for several years. In 1538, in the nearby town of Villeneuve-Loubet, through the mediation of Pope Paul III, the two monarchs concluded a ten years' truce.

In 1543, Nice was attacked by the united Franco-Ottoman forces of Francis I and Barbarossa Hayreddin Pasha, in the Siege of Nice; though the inhabitants repulsed the assault which followed the terrible bombardment, they were ultimately compelled to surrender, and Barbarossa was allowed to pillage the city and to carry off 2,500 captives. Pestilence appeared again in 1550 and 1580.

In 1600, Nice was briefly taken by the Duke of Guise. By opening the ports of the county to all nations, and proclaiming full freedom of trade (1626), the commerce of the city was given great stimulus, the noble families taking part in its mercantile enterprises.

Captured by Nicolas Catinat in 1691, Nice was restored to Savoy in 1696; but it was again besieged by the French in 1705, and in the following year its citadel and ramparts were demolished.

=== Kingdom of Sardinia ===
The Treaty of Utrecht (1713) once more gave the city back to the Duke of Savoy, who was on that same occasion recognised as King of Sicily. In the peaceful years which followed, the "new town" was built. From 1744 until the Treaty of Aix-la-Chapelle (1748) the French and Spaniards were again in possession.

In 1775 the king, who in 1718 had swapped his sovereignty of Sicily for the Kingdom of Sardinia, destroyed all that remained of the ancient liberties of the commune. Conquered in 1792 by the armies of the French First Republic, the County of Nice continued to be part of France until 1814; but after that date it reverted to the Kingdom of Piedmont-Sardinia.

=== French annexation ===
A map of the County of Nice showing the area of the Italian kingdom of Sardinia annexed in 1860 to France (light brown). The area in red had already become part of France before 1860.

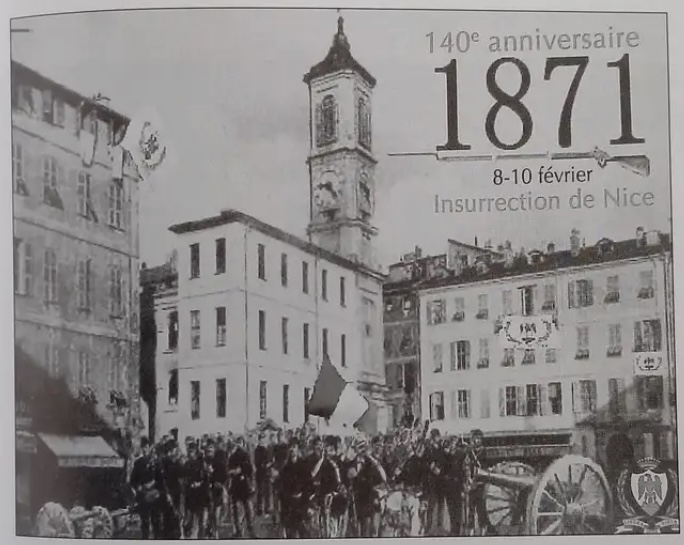
Pro-Italian protests in Nice, 1871, during the Niçard Vespers, a popular uprising in support of the union of the County of Nice with the Kingdom of Italy

After the Treaty of Turin was signed in 1860 between the Sardinian king and Napoleon III as a consequence of the Plombières Agreement, the county was again and definitively ceded to France as a territorial reward for French assistance in the Second Italian War of Independence against Austria, which saw Lombardy united with Piedmont-Sardinia. King Victor-Emmanuel II, on 1 April 1860, solemnly asked the population to accept the change of sovereignty, in the name of Italian unity, and the cession was ratified by a regional referendum. Italophile manifestations and the acclamation of an "Italian Nice" by the crowd are reported on this occasion. A plebiscite was voted on 15 and 16 April 1860. The opponents of annexation called for abstention, hence the very high abstention rate. The "yes" vote won 83% of registered voters throughout the county of Nice and 86% in Nice, partly thanks to pressure from the authorities. This is the result of a masterful operation of information control by the French and Piedmontese governments, in order to influence the outcome of the vote in relation to the decisions already taken. The irregularities in the plebiscite voting operations were evident. The case of Levens is emblematic: the same official sources recorded, faced with only 407 voters, 481 votes cast, naturally almost all in favor of joining France.

The Italian language, which was the official language of the county, used by the Church, at the town hall, taught in schools, used in theaters and at the Opera, was immediately abolished and replaced by French. Discontent over annexation to France led to the emigration of a large part of the Italophile population, also accelerated by Italian unification after 1861. A quarter of the population of Nice, around 11,000 people from Nice, decided to voluntarily exile to Italy. The emigration of a quarter of the Niçard Italians to Italy took the name of Niçard exodus. Many Italians from Nizza then moved to the Ligurian towns of Ventimiglia, Bordighera and Ospedaletti, giving rise to a local branch of the movement of the Italian irredentists which considered the re-acquisition of Nice to be one of their nationalist goals. Giuseppe Garibaldi, born in Nice, strongly opposed the cession to France, arguing that the ballot was rigged by the French. Furthermore, for the niçard general his hometown was unquestionably Italian. Politically, the liberals of Nice and the partisans of Garibaldi also appreciated very little Napoleonic authoritarianism. Elements on the right (aristocrats) as on the left (Garibaldians) therefore wanted Nice to return to Italy. Savoy was also transferred to the French crown by similar means.

In 1871, during the first free elections in the county, the pro-Italian lists obtained almost all the votes in the legislative elections (26,534 votes out of 29,428 votes cast), and Garibaldi was elected deputy at the National Assembly. Pro-Italians took to the streets cheering "Viva Nizza! Viva Garibaldi!". The French government sent 10,000 soldiers to Nice, closed the Italian newspaper Il Diritto di Nizza and imprisoned several demonstrators. The population of Nice rose up from 8 to 10 February and the three days of demonstration took the name of "Niçard Vespers". The revolt was suppressed by French troops. On 13 February, Garibaldi was not allowed to speak at the French parliament meeting in Bordeaux to ask for the reunification of Nice to the newborn Italian unitary state, and he resigned from his post as deputy. The failure of Vespers led to the expulsion of the last pro-Italian intellectuals from Nice, such as Luciano Mereu or Giuseppe Bres, who were expelled or deported.

The pro-Italian irredentist movement persisted throughout the period 1860–1914, despite the repression carried out since the annexation. The French government implemented a policy of Francization of society, language and culture. The toponyms of the communes of the ancient County were francized, with the obligation to use French in Nice, as well as certain surnames (for example the Italian surname "Bianchi" was francized into "Leblanc", and the Italian surname "Del Ponte" was francized into "Dupont").

Italian-language newspapers in Nice were banned. In 1861, La Voce di Nizza was closed (temporarily reopened during the Niçard Vespers), followed by Il Diritto di Nizza, closed in 1871. In 1895 it was the turn of Il Pensiero di Nizza, accused of irredentism. Many journalists and writers from Nice wrote in these newspapers in Italian. Among these are Enrico Sappia, Giuseppe André, Giuseppe Bres, Eugenio Cais di Pierlas and others.

During the repression of January and February 1894, the police conducted raids targeting the Italian anarchists living there, without much success.

=== 20th century ===
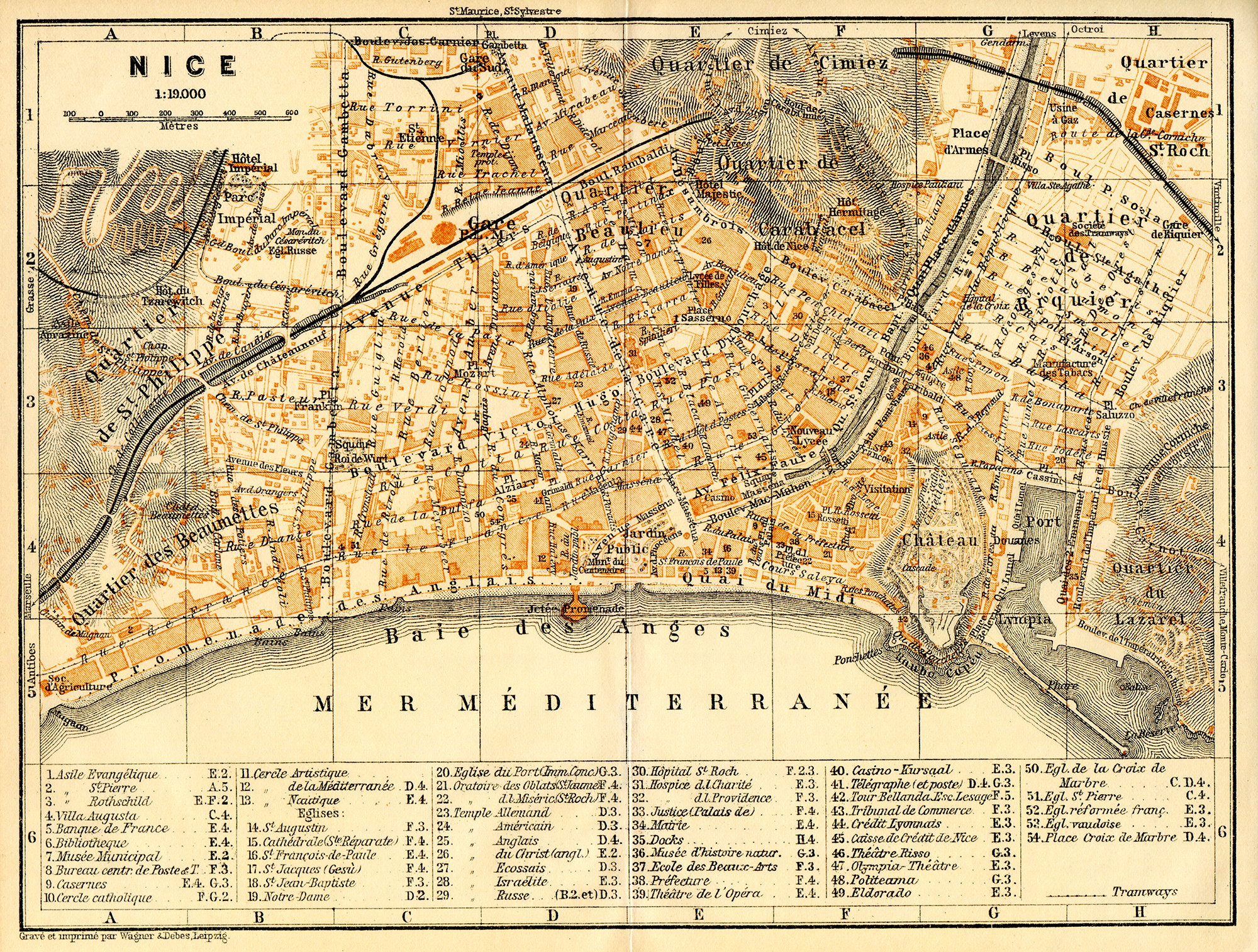
Nice in 1914

In 1900, the Tramway de Nice electrified its horse-drawn streetcars and spread its network to the entire département from Menton to Cagnes-sur-Mer. By the 1930s more bus connections were added in the area. In the 1930s, Nice hosted international car racing in the Formula Libre (predecessor to Formula One) on the so-called Circuit Nice. The circuit started along the waterfront just south of the Jardin Albert I, then headed westward along the Promenade des Anglais followed by a hairpin turn at the Hotel Negresco to come back eastward and around the Jardin Albert I before heading again east along the beach on the Quai des États-Unis.

As war broke out in September 1939, Nice became a city of refuge for many displaced foreigners, notably Jews fleeing the Nazi progression into Eastern Europe. From Nice many sought further shelter in the French colonies, Morocco and North and South America. After July 1940 and the establishment of the Vichy Regime, antisemitic aggressions accelerated the exodus, starting in July 1941 and continuing through 1942. On 26 August 1942, 655 Jews of foreign origin were rounded up by the Laval government and interned in the Auvare barracks. Of these, 560 were deported to Drancy internment camp on 31 August 1942. Due to the activity of the Jewish banker Angelo Donati and of the Capuchin friar Père Marie-Benoît the local authorities hindered the application of anti-Jewish Vichy laws.

The first résistants to the new regime were a group of high school seniors of the Lycée de Nice, now Lycée Masséna, in September 1940, later arrested and executed in 1944 near Castellane. The first public demonstrations occurred on 14 July 1942 when several hundred protesters took to the streets along the Avenue de la Victoire and in the Place Masséna. In November 1942 German troops moved into most of unoccupied France, but Italian troops moved into a smaller zone including Nice. A certain ambivalence remained among the population, many of whom were recent immigrants of Italian ancestry. However, the resistance gained momentum after the Italian surrender in 1943 when the German army occupied the former Italian zone. Reprisals intensified between December 1943 and July 1944, when many partisans were tortured and executed by the local Gestapo. American paratroopers entered the city on 30 August 1944 and Nice was finally liberated. The consequences of the war were heavy: the population decreased by 15% and economic life was totally disrupted.

In the second half of the 20th century, Nice enjoyed an economic boom primarily driven by tourism and construction. Two men dominated this period: Jean Médecin, mayor for 33 years from 1928 to 1943 and from 1947 to 1965, and his son Jacques, mayor for 24 years from 1966 to 1990. Under their leadership, there was extensive urban renewal, including many new constructions. These included the convention centre, theatres, new thoroughfares and expressways. The arrival of the Pieds-Noirs, refugees from Algeria after 1962 independence, also gave the city a boost and somewhat changed the make-up of its population and traditional views. By the late 1980s, rumors of political corruption in the city government surfaced; and eventually formal accusations against Jacques Médecin forced him to flee France in 1990. Later arrested in Uruguay in 1993, he was extradited back to France in 1994, convicted of several counts of corruption and associated crimes and sentenced to imprisonment.

On 16 October 1979, a landslide and an undersea slide caused two tsunamis that hit the western coast of Nice; these events killed between 8 and 23 people.

=== 21st century ===
In February 2001, European leaders met in Nice to negotiate and sign what is now the Treaty of Nice, amending the institutions of the European Union.

In 2003, local Chief Prosecutor Éric de Montgolfier alleged that some judicial cases involving local personalities had been suspiciously derailed by the local judiciary, which he suspected of having unhealthy contacts through Masonic lodges with the defendants. A controversial official report stated later that Montgolfier had made unwarranted accusations.

On 14 July 2016, a truck was deliberately driven into a crowd of people by Mohamed Lahouaiej-Bouhlel on the Promenade des Anglais. The crowd was watching a fireworks display in celebration of Bastille Day. A total of 87 people were killed, including the perpetrator, who was shot dead by police. Another 434 were injured, with 52 in critical care and 25 in intensive care, according to the Paris prosecutor. On 29 October 2020, a stabbing attack killed three people at the local Notre-Dame de Nice. One of the victims, a woman, was beheaded by the attacker. Several additional victims were injured. The attacker, who was shot by the police, was taken into custody. The Islamic state claimed responsibility for both attacks.

In 2021, the city was proclaimed a World Heritage Site by UNESCO as "Nice, Winter Resort Town of the Riviera".

On 18 July 2024, seven people from the same family, including three young children, three adults and a teenager were killed in an arson attack. The fire also critically injured one other person and caused thirty other people to suffer from smoke inhalation.

== Architecture ==
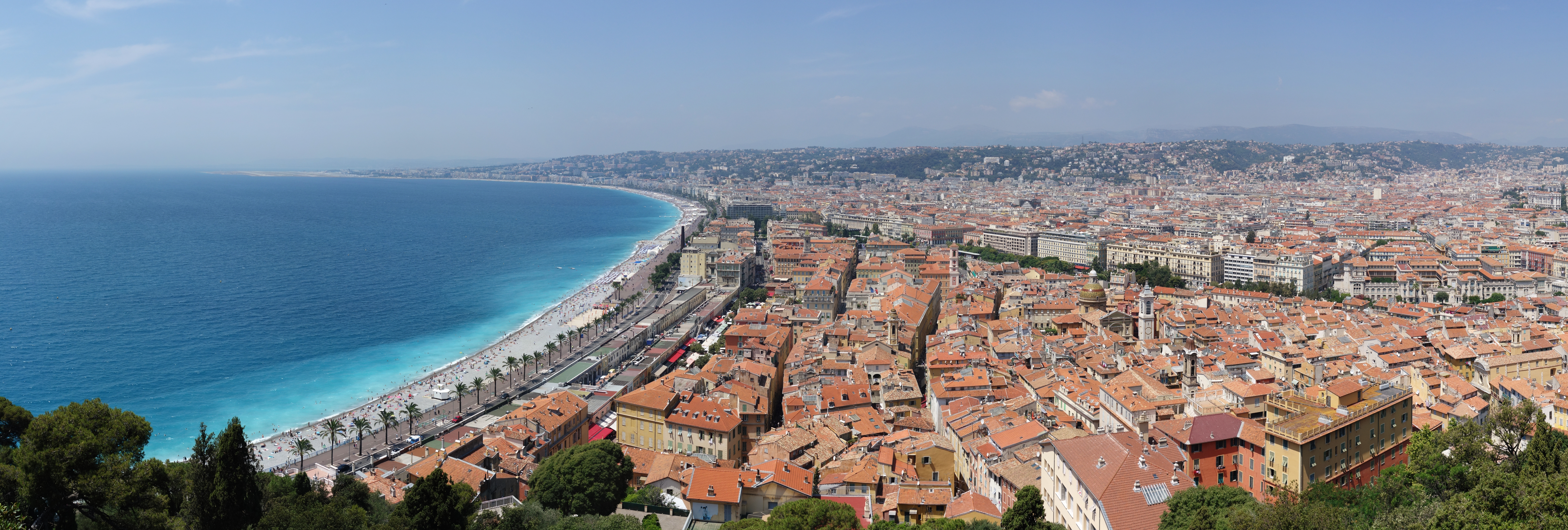
Panorama of Nice from Colline du Château

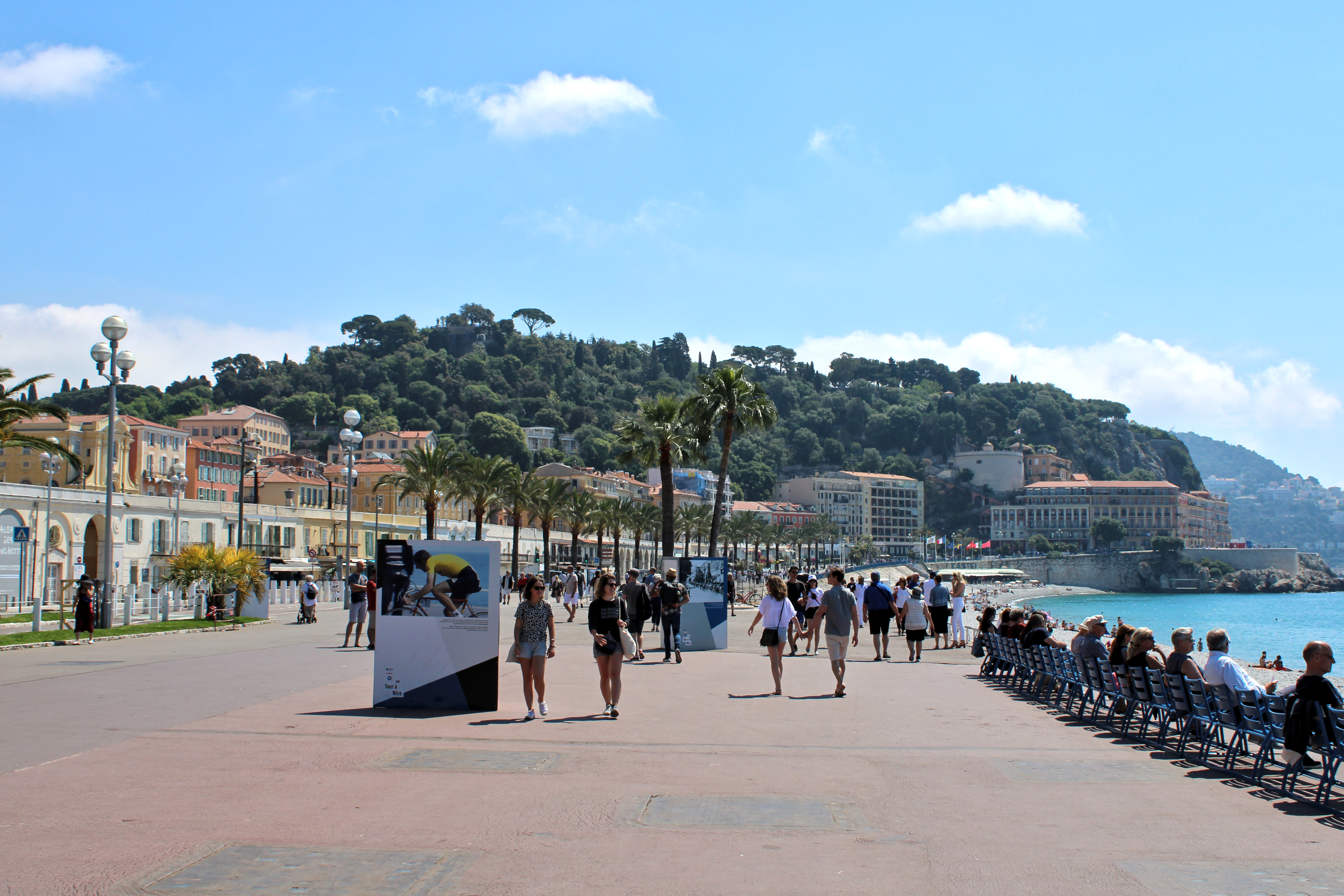
Promenade des Anglais

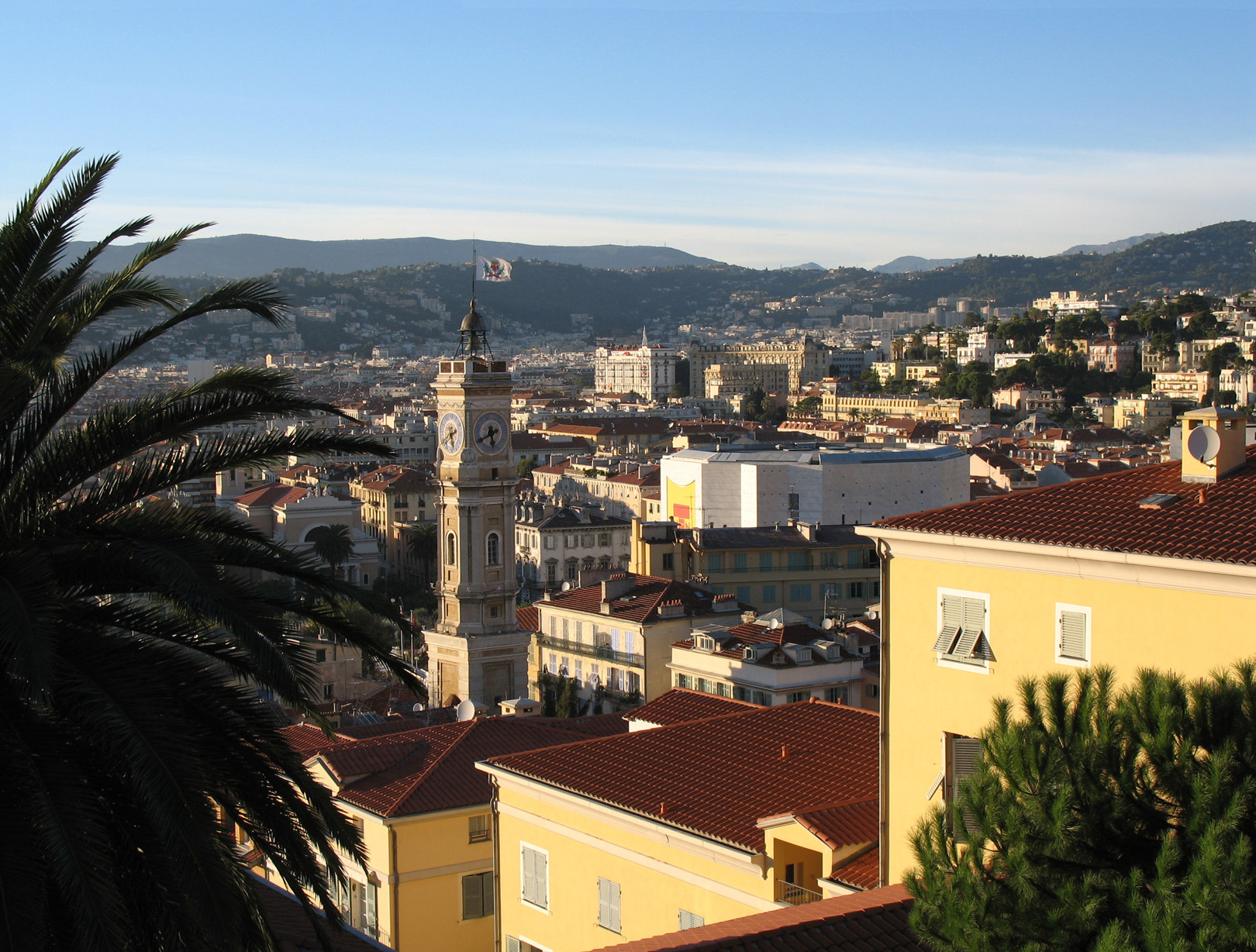
View of the old town

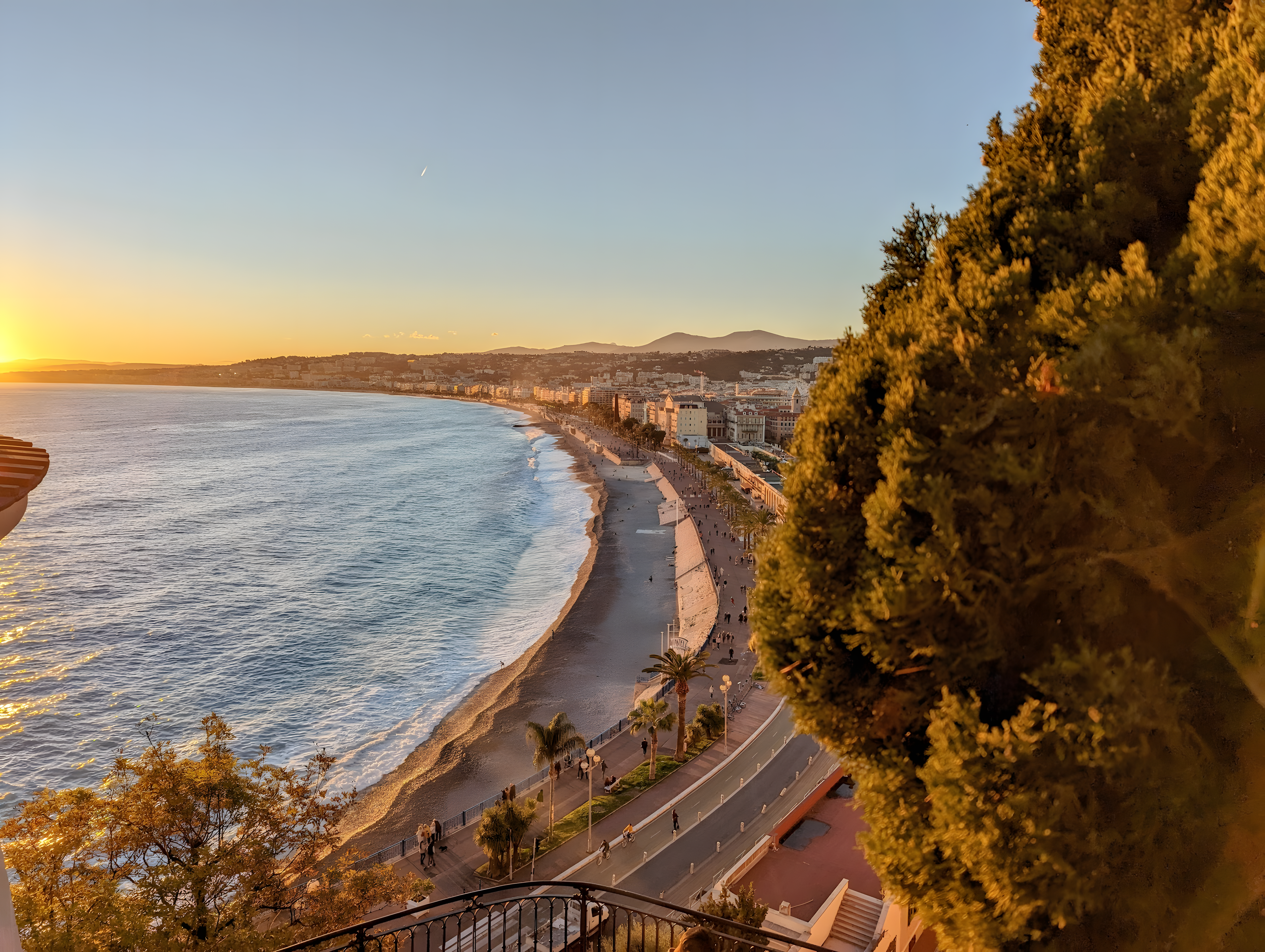
A sunset over the Promenade des Anglais

The Promenade des Anglais ("Walkway of the English") is a promenade along the Baie des Anges ("Bay of the Angels"), which is a bay of the Mediterranean in Nice. Before Nice was urbanised, the coastline at Nice was just bordered by a deserted stretch of shingle beach (covered with large pebbles). The first houses were located on higher ground well away from the sea, as wealthy tourists visiting Nice in the 18th century did not come for the beach, but for the gentle winter weather. The areas close to the water were home to Nice's dockworkers and fishermen.

In the second half of the 18th century, many wealthy English people took to spending the winter in Nice, enjoying the panorama along the coast. This early aristocratic English colony conceived the building of a promenade with the leadership and financial support of Rev. Lewis Way. With the initial promenade completed, the city of Nice, intrigued by the prospect, greatly increased the scope of the work. The Promenade was first called the Camin dei Anglès (the English Way) by the Niçois in their native dialect Nissart. In 1823, the promenade was named La Promenade des Anglais by the French, a name that would stick after the annexation of Nice by France in 1860.

The Hotel Negresco on the Promenade des Anglais was named after Henri Negresco who had the palatial hotel constructed in 1912. In keeping with the conventions of the time, when the Negresco first opened in 1913 its front opened on the side opposite the Mediterranean.

Beginning at Place Masséna, heading east and parallel to the Promenade des Anglais, there is a "Zone Piétonne", or "Pedestrian Zone". Cars are not allowed (with the exception of delivery trucks), making this avenue a popular walkway.

Old Nice is also home to the Opéra de Nice. It was constructed at the end of the 19th century under the design of François Aune, to replace King Charles Félix's Maccarani Theater. Today, it is open to the public and provides a regular program of performances.

Other sights include:

- Palais communal de Nice
- Palais de la Méditerranée
- Palais de l'agriculture
- Gare du Sud
- Jardin Albert-Ier
- Castle of Nice
- Colline du Château
- Monument aux morts de Rauba-Capeù

=== Religious buildings ===
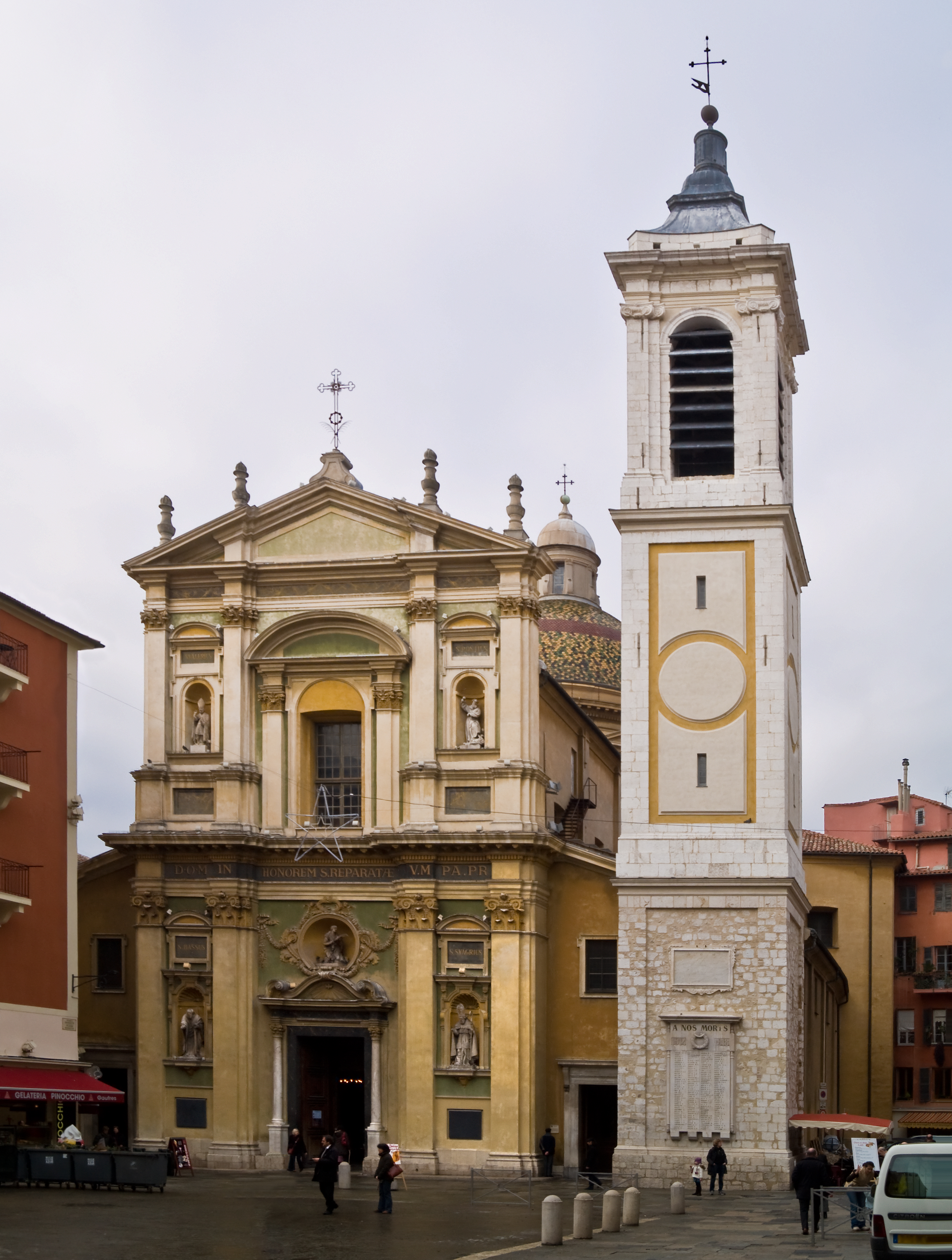
Nice Cathedral

Religious buildings in the city include:

- Nice Cathedral
- Notre-Dame de Nice
- Russian Orthodox Cathedral, Nice
- Église Notre-Dame-du-Port de Nice
- Church of Gesù, Nice
- Église Saint-Pierre-d'Arène de Nice
- Saint Nicholas and Saint Alexandra Church

=== Museums ===
- Musée Masséna
- Musée des Beaux-Arts de Nice
- Musée Matisse
- Musée Marc Chagall
- Musée archéologique de Nice-Cimiez
- Musée de Préhistoire de Terra Amata

=== Squares ===
==== Place Masséna ====
The Place Masséna is the main square of the city. Before the Paillon River was covered over, the Pont-Neuf was the only practicable way between the old town and the modern one. The square was thus divided into two parts (North and South) in 1824. With the demolition of the Masséna Casino in 1979, the Place Masséna became more spacious and less dense and is now bordered by red ochre buildings of Italian architecture.

The recent rebuilding of the tramline gave the square back to the pedestrians, restoring its status as a real Mediterranean square. It is lined with palm trees and stone pines. Since its construction, the Place Masséna has been the spot for public events. It is used for concerts, the summer festivals, the Corso carnavalesque (carnival parade) in February, the military procession on 14 July (Bastille Day) and other traditional celebrations and banquets.

The Place Masséna is a two-minute walk from the Promenade des Anglais, old town, town center, and Albert I Garden (Jardin Albert Ier). It is also a large crossroads between several of the main streets of the city: avenue Jean Médecin, avenue Félix Faure, boulevard Jean Jaurès, avenue de Verdun and rue Gioffredo.

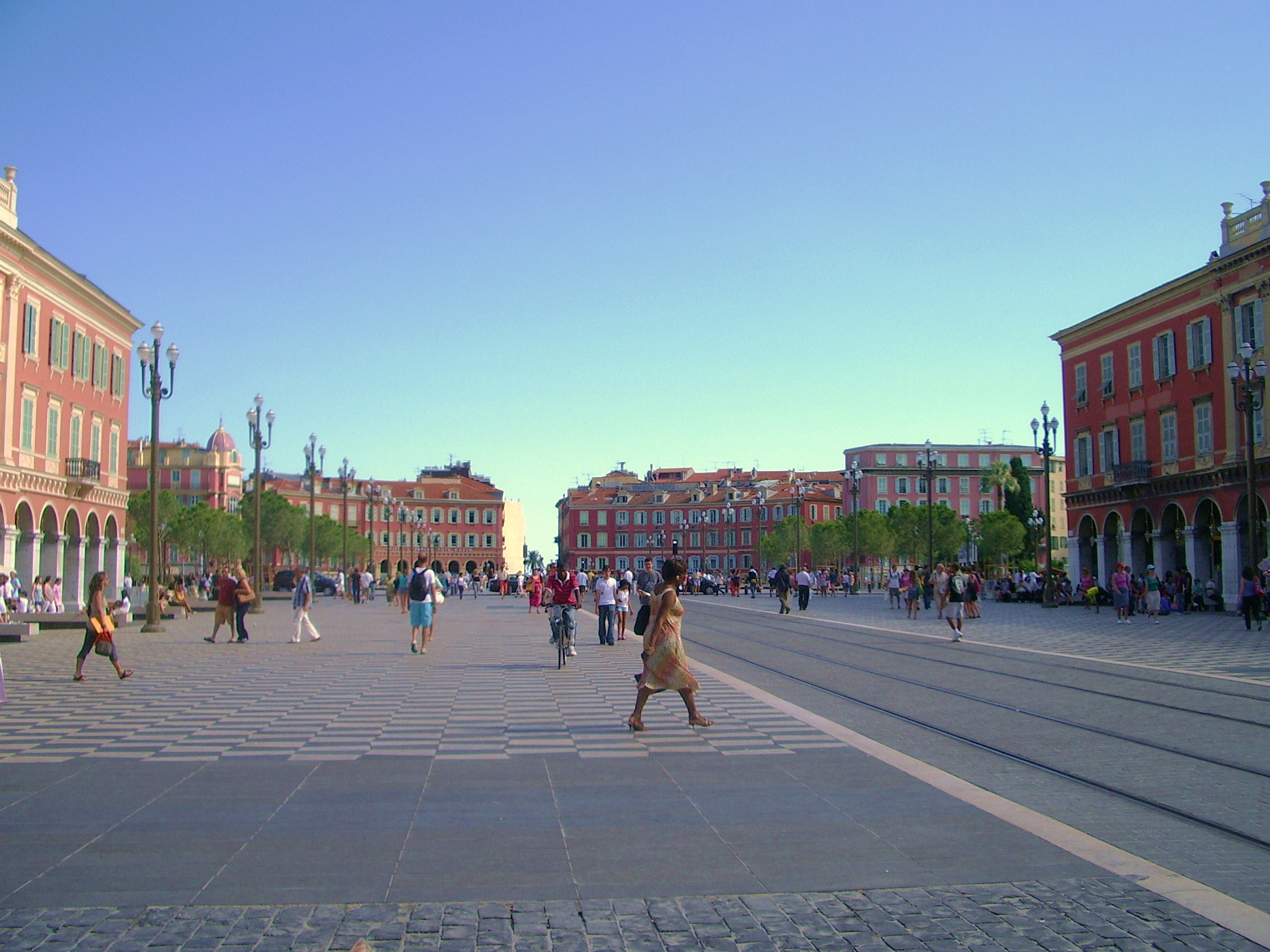
View of the Place Masséna

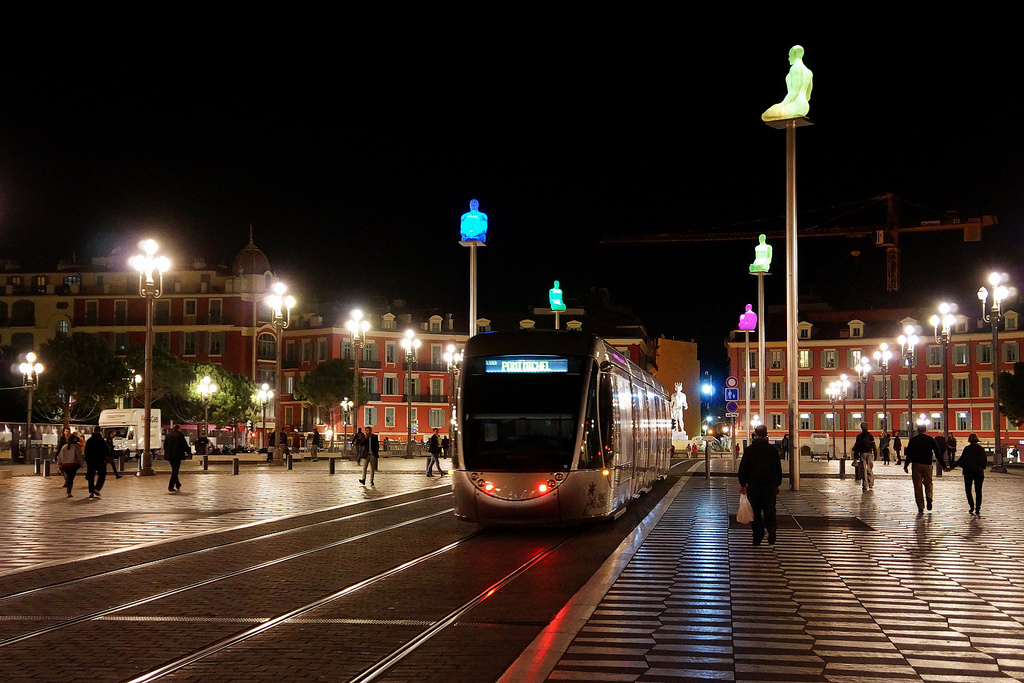
Place Masséna by night, 2012

==== Place Garibaldi ====
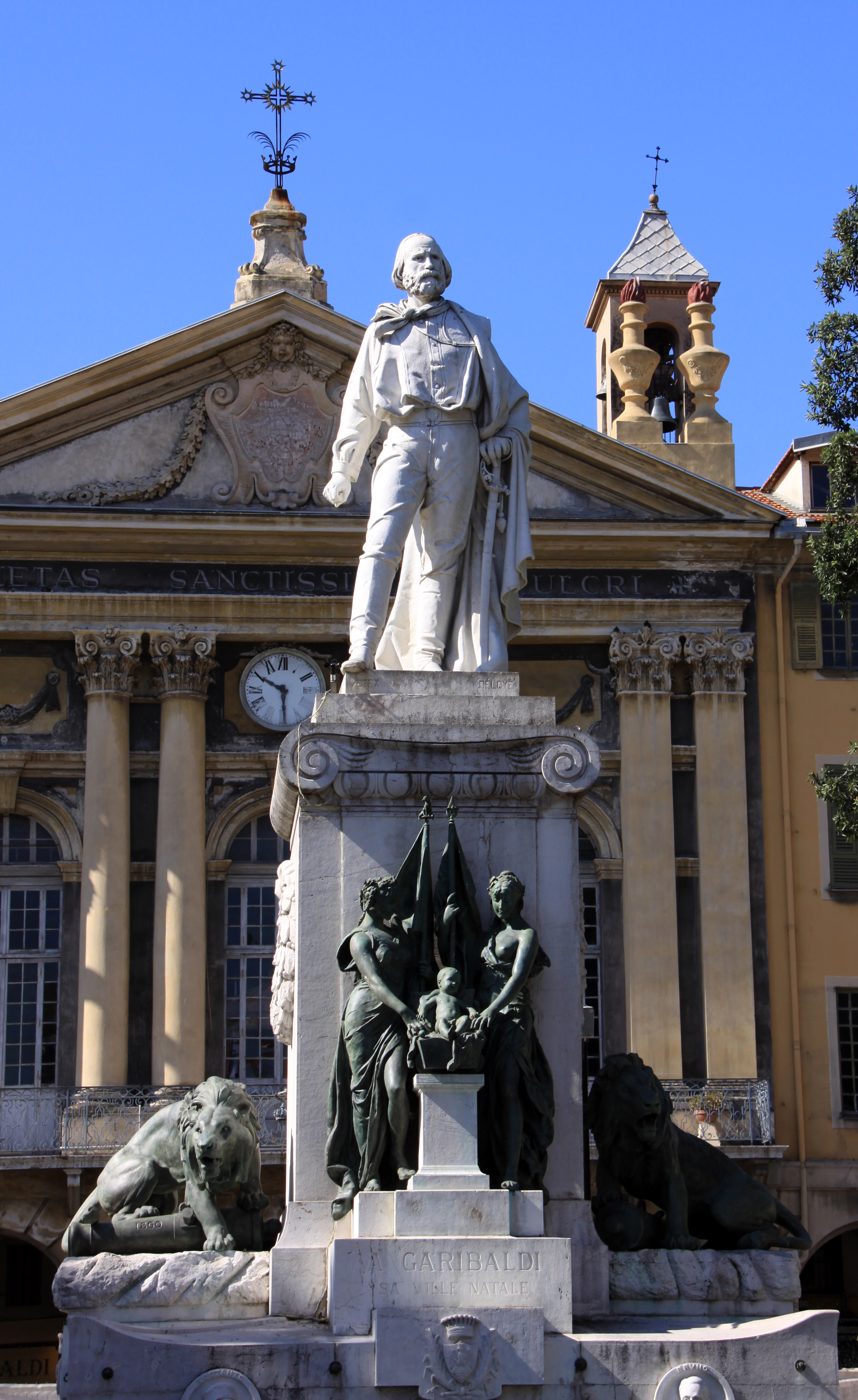
Garibaldi's monument, Place Garibaldi

The Place Garibaldi is named after Giuseppe Garibaldi, hero of the Italian unification (born in Nice in 1807 when Nice was part of the Napoleonic Empire, before reverting to the Kingdom of Piedmont-Sardinia). The square was built at the end of the 18th century and served as the entry gate to the city and end of the road from Turin. It took several names between 1780 and 1870 (Plaça Pairoulièra, Place de la République, Place Napoléon, Place d'Armes, Place Saint-Augustin, Piazza Vittorio) and finally Place Garibaldi in September 1870.

A statue of Garibaldi, who was fiercely in favour of the union of Nice with Italy, stands in the centre of the square. The rebuilding of the area to accommodate a new tramway line gave almost the entire square to pedestrians. The architecture is in line with the Turin model, which was the norm of urban renewal throughout the entire realm of the House of Savoy.

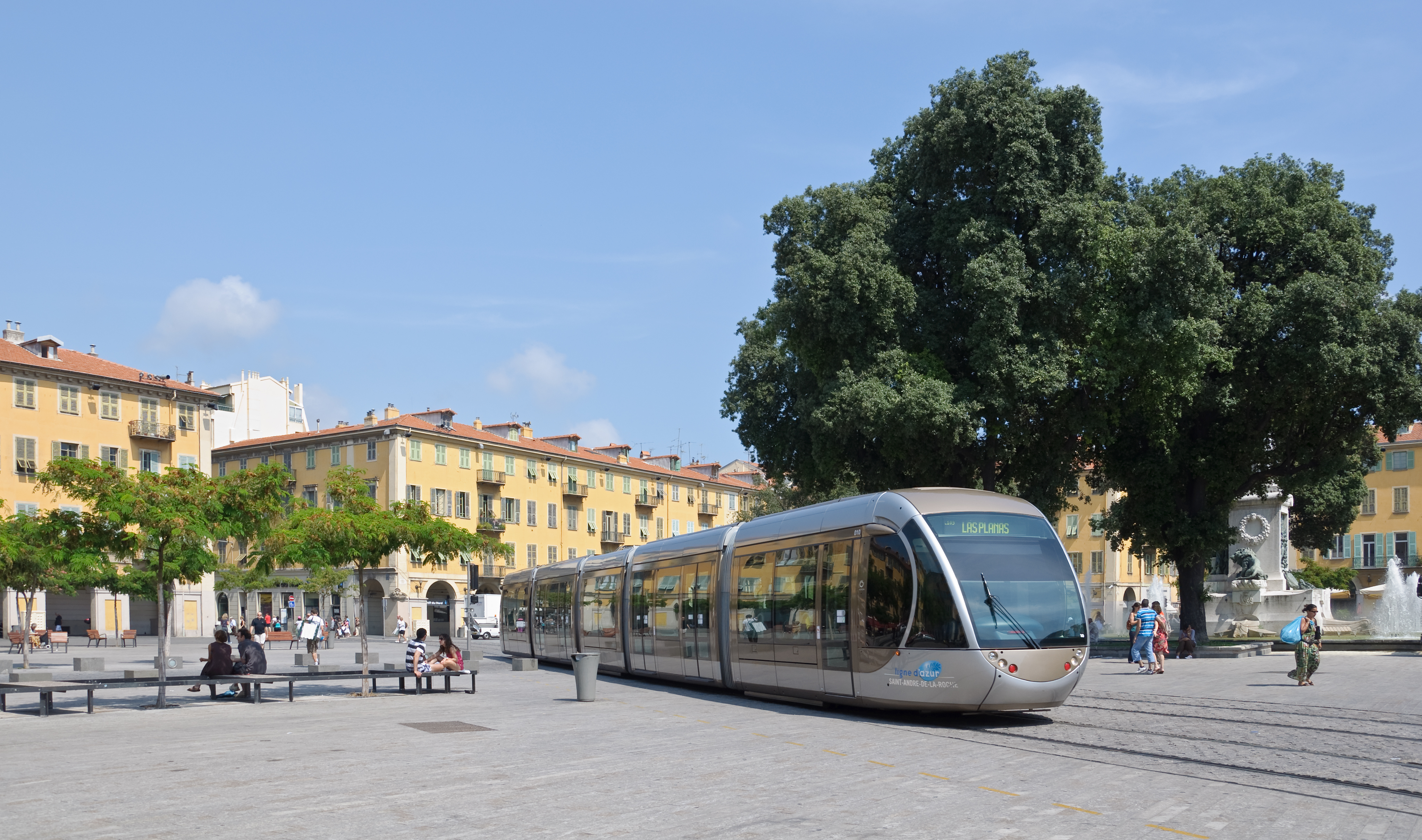
Place Garibaldi, pedestrian since the introduction of the Nice tramway

It is a crossroads between the Vieux Nice (old town) and the town center. Place Garibaldi is close to the eastern districts of Nice, Port Lympia (Lympia Harbour), and the TNL commercial centre.

==== Place Rossetti ====
Entirely enclosed and pedestrianised, this square is located in the old town. With typical buildings in red and yellow ochres surrounding the square, the cathédrale Sainte-Réparate and there is a fountain in the center. By day, the place is filled by the terraces of traditional restaurants and ice-cream makers. By night, the environment changes radically, with tourists and young people flocking to the square.

Place Rossetti is in the centre of the old town, streets Jesus, Rossetti, Mascoïnat and the Pont-vieux (old bridge).

==== Cours Saleya ====
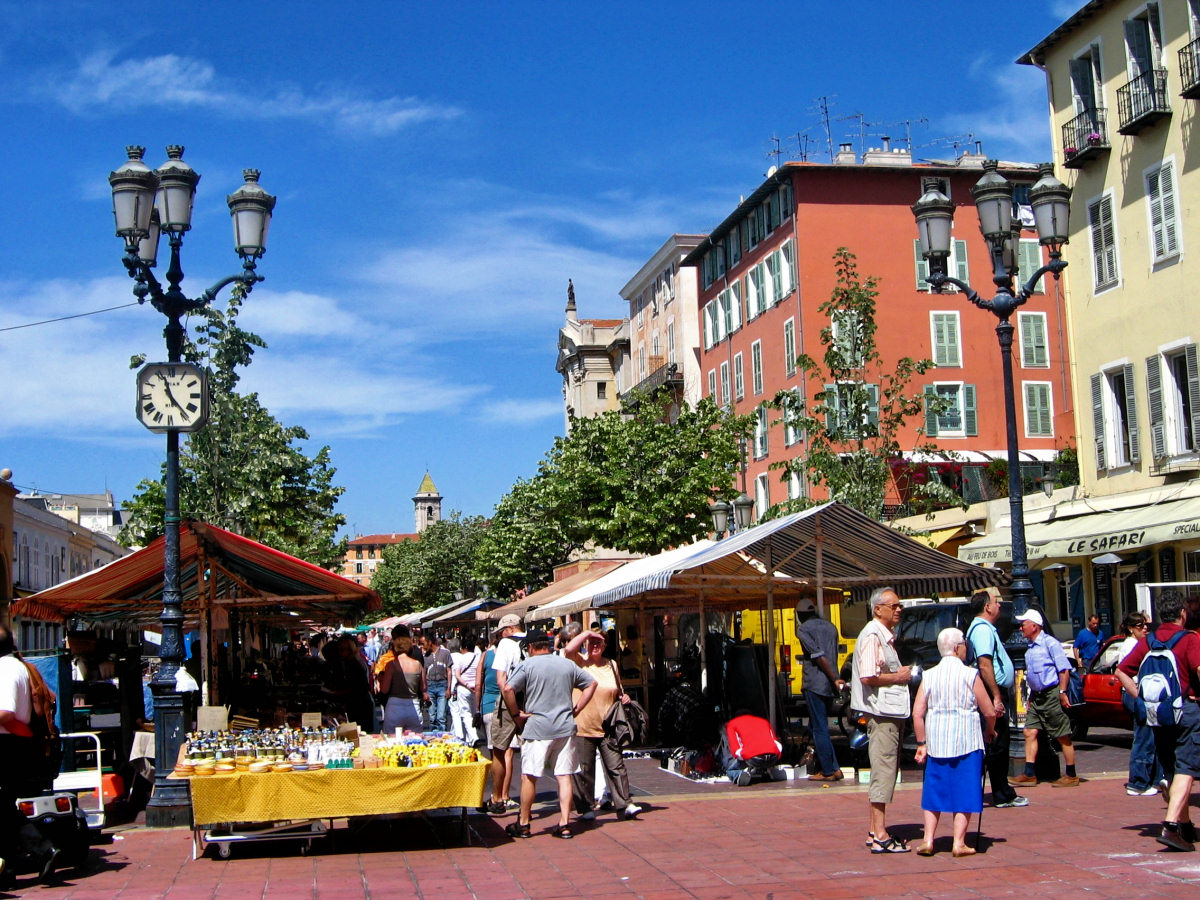
Saleya Course (2007)

The Cours Saleya is situated parallel to the Quai des États-Unis. In the past, it belonged to the upper classes. It hosts a daily market with flowers, art vendors, and antiques.

==== Place du Palais ====
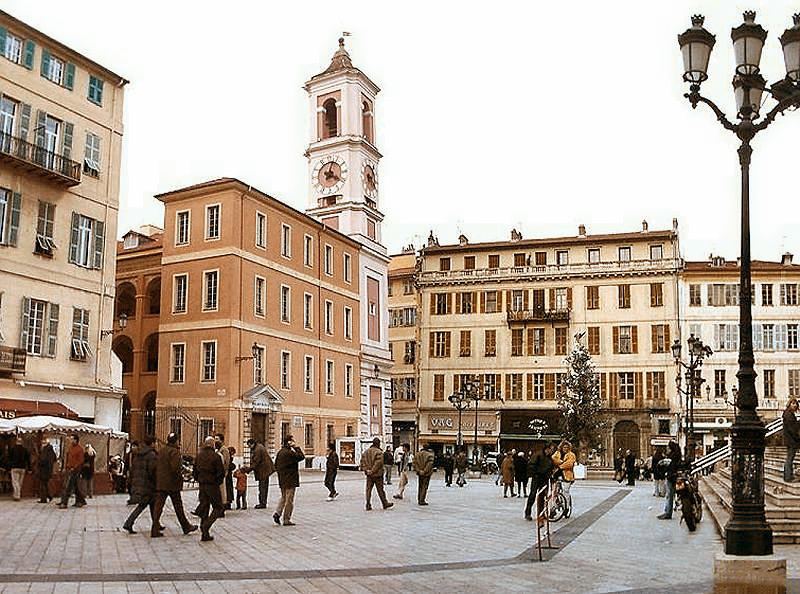
Place du Palais view of the Rusca palace

The Place du Palais is where the Palais de la Justice (Law courts) of Nice is located. On this square, there also is the Palais Rusca, which also belongs to the justice department (home of the tribunal de grande instance).

== Administration ==
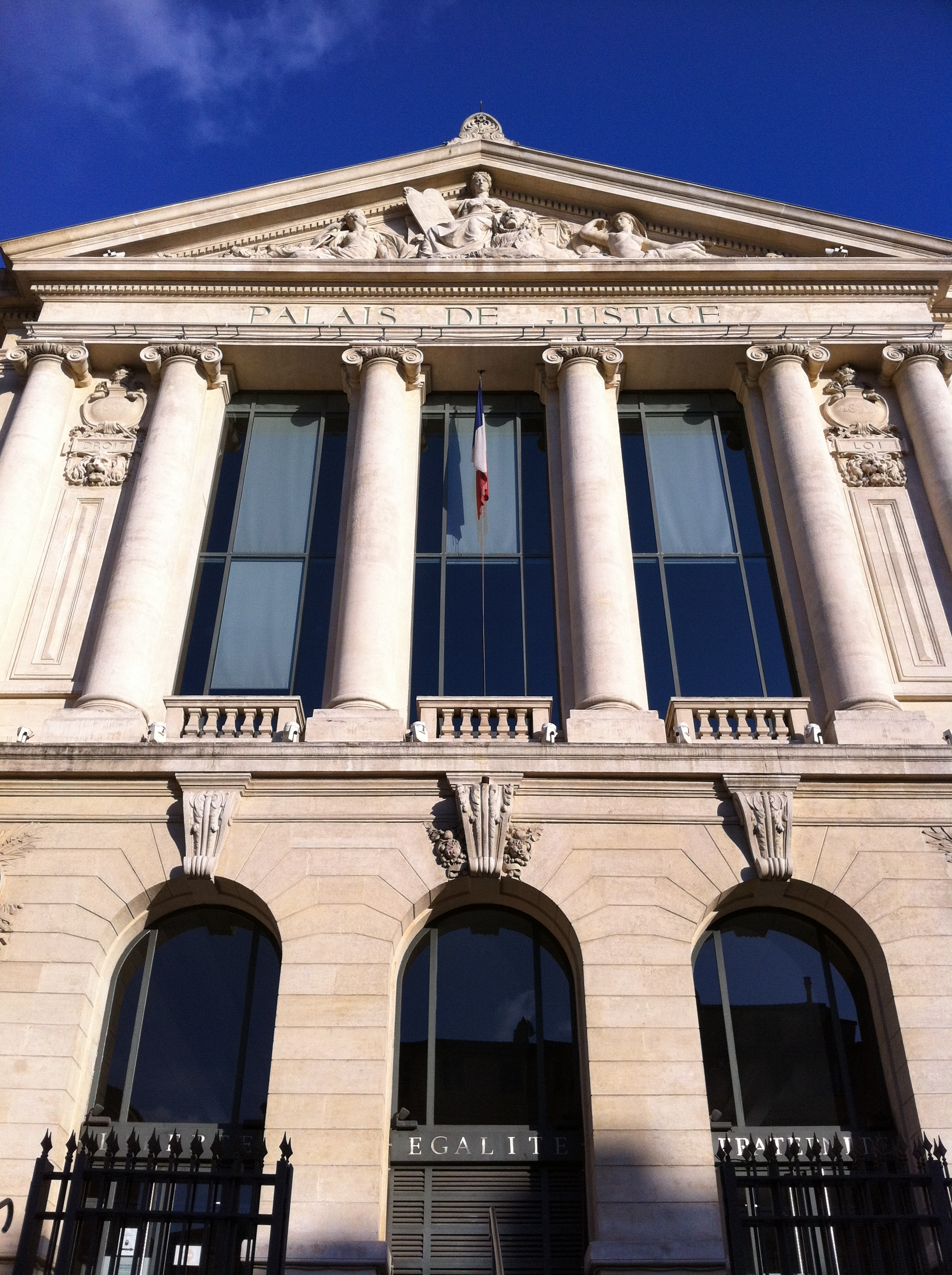
The Palais de Justice

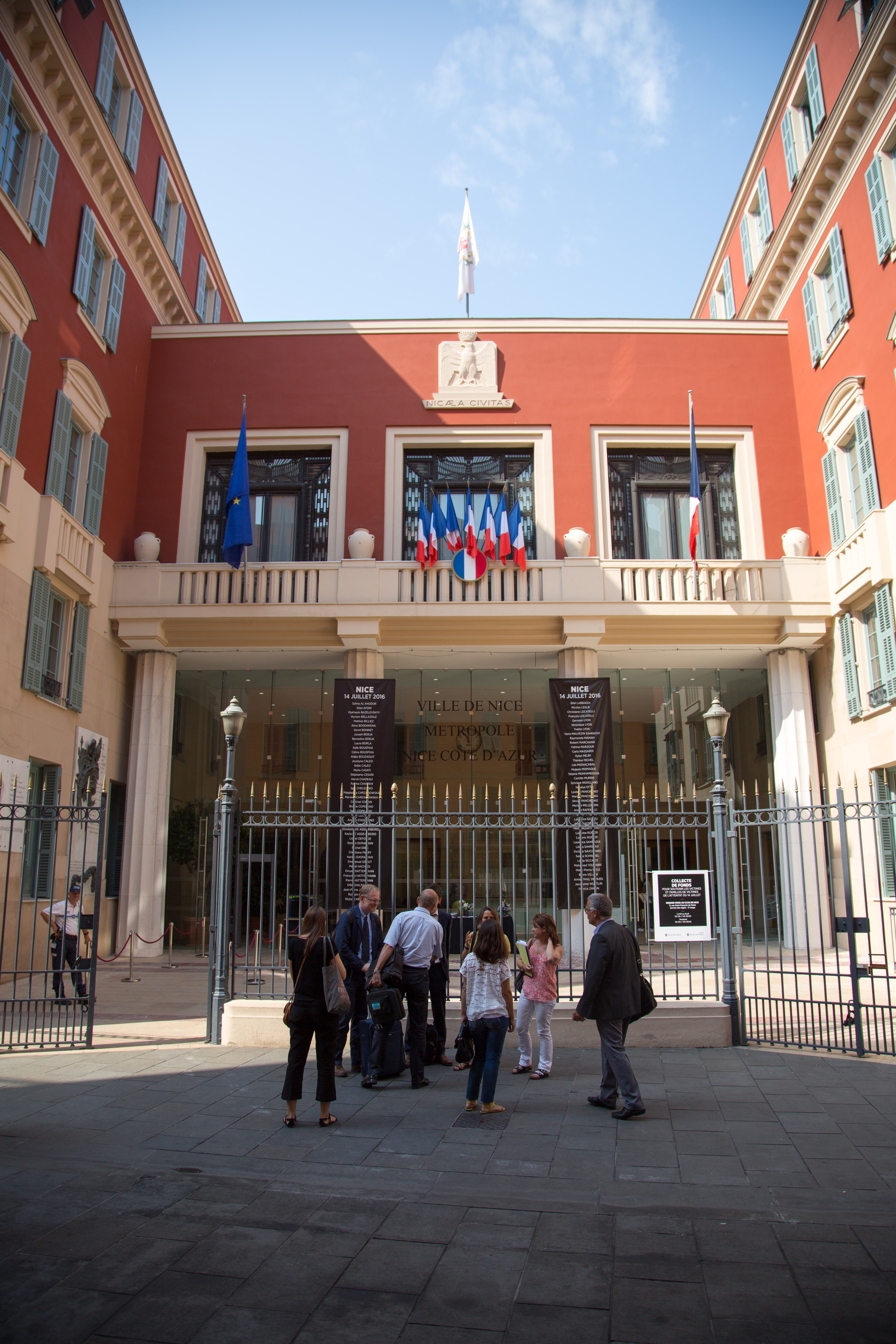
Hôtel de Ville

Located in the Provence-Alpes-Côte d'Azur region, Nice is a commune and the prefecture (administrative capital) of the Alpes-Maritimes département. However, it is also the largest city in France that is not a regional capital; the much larger Marseille is its regional capital. Éric Ciotti, its mayor, is a member of the Union of the Right for the Republic (formerly a member of The Republicans). He has been incumbent since 2026. The city council is based at the Hôtel de Ville.

The city is divided into nine cantons: Nice-1, 2, 3, 4, 5, 6, 7, 8 and 9.

=== Coat of arms ===
Banner of arms of the city of Nice

The coat of arms of Nice appeared for the first time in a copy of the Regulations of Amadeus VIII, probably written around 1430. The Nice is symbolised by a red eagle on silver background, placed on three mountains, which can be described in French heraldic language as "d'argent à une aigle de gueule posée sur trois coupeaux". ("Upon silver a red eagle is displayed, posed upon three mounds.") The arms have only undergone minor changes: the eagle has become more and more stylised, it now "wears" a coronet for the County of Nice, and the three mountains are now surrounded by a stylised sea.

The presence of the eagle, an imperial emblem, shows that these arms are related to the power of the House of Savoy. The eagle standing over the three hills is a depiction of Savoy, referring to its domination over the country around Nice. The combination of silver and red (argent and gules) is a reference to the colours of the flag of Savoy. The three mountains symbolise a territorial honour, without concern for geographic realism.

== Geography ==
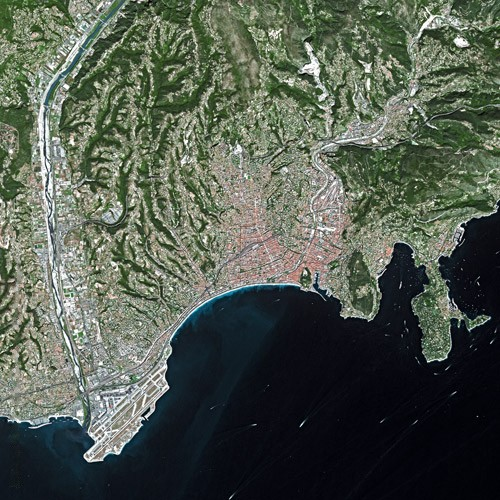
Nice seen from Spot Satellite

Nice consists of two large bays. Villefranche-sur-Mer sits on an enclosed bay, while the main expanse of the city lies between the old port city and the Aeroport de Côte d'Azur, across a gently curving bay. The city rises from the flat beach into gentle rising hills, then is bounded by surrounding mountains that represent the Southern and nearly the Western extent of the Ligurian Alps range.

=== Flora ===
The natural vegetation of Nice is typical for a Mediterranean landscape, with a heavy representation of broadleaf evergreen shrubs. Trees tend to be scattered but form dense forests in some areas. Large native tree species include evergreens such as holm oak, stone pine and arbutus. Many introduced species grow in parks and gardens. Palms, eucalyptus and citrus fruits are among the trees which give Nice a subtropical appearance. But there are also species familiar to temperate areas around the world; examples include horse chestnut, linden and even Norway spruce.

=== Climate ===
Nice has a hot-summer Mediterranean climate (Köppen: Csa), enjoying mild winters with moderate rainfall. It is one of the warmest Mediterranean climates for its latitude. Summers are warm to hot, dry, and sunny. Rainfall is rare in this season, and a typical July month only records one or two days with measurable rainfall. The temperature is typically above 26 °C (79 °F) but rarely above 32 °C (90 °F). The climate data is recorded from the airport, located just metres from the sea. Summer temperatures, therefore, are often higher in the city. The average maximum temperature in the warmest months of July and August is about 27 °C (81 °F). The highest recorded temperature was 37.7 °C (99.9 °F) on 1 August 2006. Autumn generally starts sunny in September and becomes more cloudy and rainy towards October, while temperatures usually remain above 20 °C (68 °F) until November where days start to cool down to around 17 °C (63 °F).

Winters are characterised by mild days (11 to 17 °C (52 to 63 °F)), cool nights (4 to 9 °C (39 to 48 °F)), and variable weather. Days can be either sunny and dry or damp and rainy. The average minimum temperature in January is around 5 °C (41 °F). Frost is unusual and snowfalls are rare. The most recent snowfall in Nice was on 26 February 2018. Nice also received a dusting of snow in 2005, 2009 and 2010. Spring starts cool and rainy in late March, and Nice becomes increasingly warm and sunny around June.

Climate data for Nice (Nice Côte d'Azur Airport), elevation: 4 m or 13 ft, 1991–2020 normals, extremes 1942–present
Month	Jan	Feb	Mar	Apr	May	Jun	Jul	Aug	Sep	Oct	Nov	Dec	Year
Record high °C (°F)	22.5 (72.5)	25.8 (78.4)	26.1 (79.0)	26.1 (79.0)	31.4 (88.5)	36.8 (98.2)	37.0 (98.6)	37.7 (99.9)	33.9 (93.0)	29.9 (85.8)	25.4 (77.7)	22.0 (71.6)	37.7 (99.9)
Mean daily maximum °C (°F)	13.3 (55.9)	13.5 (56.3)	15.4 (59.7)	17.4 (63.3)	21.0 (69.8)	24.7 (76.5)	27.5 (81.5)	27.9 (82.2)	24.8 (76.6)	21.0 (69.8)	17.0 (62.6)	14.1 (57.4)	19.8 (67.6)
Daily mean °C (°F)	9.5 (49.1)	9.8 (49.6)	11.8 (53.2)	14.1 (57.4)	17.7 (63.9)	21.4 (70.5)	24.1 (75.4)	24.5 (76.1)	21.2 (70.2)	17.5 (63.5)	13.3 (55.9)	10.3 (50.5)	16.3 (61.3)
Mean daily minimum °C (°F)	5.8 (42.4)	6.1 (43.0)	8.3 (46.9)	10.8 (51.4)	14.5 (58.1)	18.1 (64.6)	20.8 (69.4)	21.1 (70.0)	17.7 (63.9)	14.0 (57.2)	9.7 (49.5)	6.6 (43.9)	12.8 (55.0)
Record low °C (°F)	−7.2 (19.0)	−5.8 (21.6)	−5.0 (23.0)	2.9 (37.2)	3.7 (38.7)	8.1 (46.6)	11.7 (53.1)	11.4 (52.5)	7.6 (45.7)	4.2 (39.6)	0.1 (32.2)	−2.7 (27.1)	−7.2 (19.0)
Average precipitation mm (inches)	73.5 (2.89)	53.6 (2.11)	51.0 (2.01)	68.8 (2.71)	40.3 (1.59)	35.7 (1.41)	13.6 (0.54)	17.2 (0.68)	81.0 (3.19)	127.9 (5.04)	138.4 (5.45)	90.3 (3.56)	791.3 (31.15)
Average precipitation days (≥ 1.0 mm)	5.8	5.1	4.9	6.4	5.1	3.8	1.8	2.3	4.9	7.5	8.5	6.0	62.1
Average snowy days	0.3	0.7	0.0	0.0	0.0	0.0	0.0	0.0	0.0	0.0	0.0	0.2	1.1
Average relative humidity (%)	67	68	69	72	75	75	73	72	74	73	71	67	71.3
Mean monthly sunshine hours	156.7	166.1	218.0	229.2	270.9	309.8	349.3	323.2	249.8	191.1	151.5	145.2	2,760.5
Average ultraviolet index	1	2	4	5	7	8	8	7	5	3	2	1	4
Source 1: Météo-France
Source 2: Infoclimat.fr (relative humidity 1961–1990), Weather Atlas

Climate data for Nice (Nice Côte d'Azur Airport), elevation: 4 m or 13 ft, 1961–1990 normals and extremes
Month	Jan	Feb	Mar	Apr	May	Jun	Jul	Aug	Sep	Oct	Nov	Dec	Year
Record high °C (°F)	19.6 (67.3)	25.8 (78.4)	23.8 (74.8)	25.2 (77.4)	30.3 (86.5)	31.1 (88.0)	35.7 (96.3)	34.4 (93.9)	33.9 (93.0)	29.9 (85.8)	23.8 (74.8)	21.3 (70.3)	35.7 (96.3)
Mean maximum °C (°F)	14.7 (58.5)	17.6 (63.7)	16.5 (61.7)	18.1 (64.6)	21.8 (71.2)	25.1 (77.2)	28.7 (83.7)	28.4 (83.1)	26.4 (79.5)	22.7 (72.9)	17.7 (63.9)	14.7 (58.5)	28.7 (83.7)
Mean daily maximum °C (°F)	12.6 (54.7)	13.1 (55.6)	14.7 (58.5)	16.6 (61.9)	19.7 (67.5)	23.1 (73.6)	26.5 (79.7)	26.8 (80.2)	24.3 (75.7)	21.0 (69.8)	16.4 (61.5)	13.6 (56.5)	19.0 (66.3)
Daily mean °C (°F)	8.7 (47.7)	9.4 (48.9)	11.0 (51.8)	13.1 (55.6)	16.4 (61.5)	19.8 (67.6)	22.9 (73.2)	23.1 (73.6)	20.5 (68.9)	17.0 (62.6)	12.5 (54.5)	9.7 (49.5)	15.3 (59.6)
Mean daily minimum °C (°F)	4.8 (40.6)	5.8 (42.4)	7.3 (45.1)	9.7 (49.5)	13.0 (55.4)	16.3 (61.3)	19.3 (66.7)	19.4 (66.9)	16.9 (62.4)	13.3 (55.9)	8.4 (47.1)	5.7 (42.3)	11.7 (53.0)
Mean minimum °C (°F)	2.1 (35.8)	2.5 (36.5)	4.1 (39.4)	8.1 (46.6)	11.0 (51.8)	14.8 (58.6)	17.3 (63.1)	17.0 (62.6)	13.8 (56.8)	8.4 (47.1)	6.9 (44.4)	3.2 (37.8)	2.1 (35.8)
Record low °C (°F)	−7.2 (19.0)	−5.8 (21.6)	−5.0 (23.0)	2.9 (37.2)	6.6 (43.9)	8.1 (46.6)	10.0 (50.0)	13.0 (55.4)	7.6 (45.7)	4.5 (40.1)	0.6 (33.1)	−2.7 (27.1)	−7.2 (19.0)
Average precipitation mm (inches)	61.3 (2.41)	50.8 (2.00)	66.2 (2.61)	57.0 (2.24)	37.4 (1.47)	30.8 (1.21)	6.5 (0.26)	24.5 (0.96)	29.5 (1.16)	78.9 (3.11)	91.5 (3.60)	67.1 (2.64)	601.5 (23.67)
Average precipitation days (≥ 1.0 mm)	6.8	6.4	6.1	6.3	5.2	4.1	1.9	3.1	4.0	5.8	7.0	6.0	62.7
Average snowy days	0.7	0.2	0.1	0.0	0.0	0.0	0.0	0.0	0.0	0.0	0.1	0.3	1.4
Average relative humidity (%)	67	68	69	72	75	75	73	72	74	73	71	67	71.3
Mean monthly sunshine hours	150.3	151.9	202.3	226.9	269.8	295.7	340.4	306.8	238.7	205.0	155.5	150.9	2,694.2
Percentage possible sunshine	53	52	55	57	60	65	74	72	64	61	55	55	60
Source 1: NOAA
Source 2: Infoclimat.fr (humidity)

Climate data for Nice
Month	Jan	Feb	Mar	Apr	May	Jun	Jul	Aug	Sep	Oct	Nov	Dec	Year
Average sea temperature °C (°F)	13.4 (56.1)	13.0 (55.4)	13.4 (56.1)	14.6 (58.3)	18.0 (64.4)	21.8 (71.2)	23.1 (73.6)	23.6 (74.5)	22.2 (72.0)	19.6 (67.3)	17.4 (63.3)	14.9 (58.8)	17.9 (64.3)
Mean daily daylight hours	9.0	11.0	12.0	13.0	15.0	15.0	15.0	14.0	12.0	11.0	10.0	9.0	12.2
Source: Weather Atlas

== Economy and tourism ==
Nice is the seat of the Chamber of Commerce and Industry Nice Côte d'Azur, which manages the Port of Nice. Investors from France and abroad can benefit from the assistance of the Côte d'Azur Economic Development Agency Team Côte d'Azur.

Nice has one conference centre: the Palais des Congrès Acropolis. The city also has several business parks, including l'Arenas, Nice the Plain, Nice Méridia, Saint Isidore, and the Northern Forum.

In addition, the city features several shopping centres such as Nicetoile on Avenue Jean Médecin, Cap3000 in Saint-Laurent-du-Var (the 5th-biggest mall in France by surface area), Nice TNL, Nice Lingostière, Northern Forum, St-Isidore, the Trinity (around the Auchan hypermarket) and Polygone Riviera in Cagnes-sur-Mer.

Sophia Antipolis is a technology park northwest of Antibes. Much of the park is within the commune of Valbonne. Established between 1970 and 1984, it primarily houses companies in the fields of computing, electronics, pharmacology and biotechnology. Several institutions of higher learning are also located here, along with the European headquarters of W3C. It is known as "Europe's first science and technology hub" and is valued at more than 5 billion euros.

The Nice metropolitan area had a GDP amounting to $47.7 billion, and $34,480 per capita, slightly lower than the French average.

== Infrastructure ==
=== Transport ===
==== Port ====
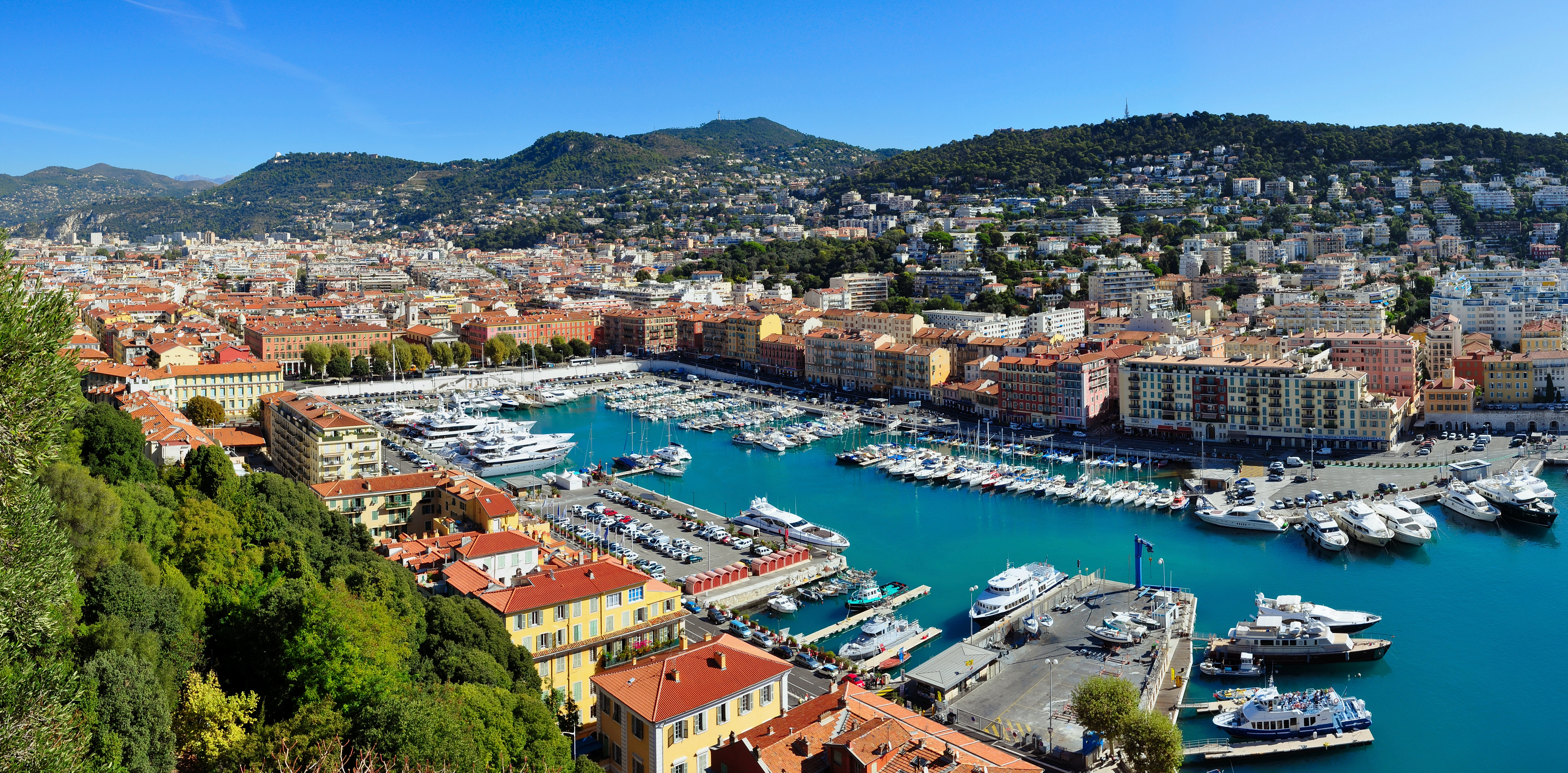
Port of Nice

The main port of Nice is also known as Lympia port. This name comes from the Lympia spring which fed a small lake in a marshy zone where work on the port was started in 1745. Today this is the principal harbour installation of Nice – there is also a small port in the Carras district. The port is the first port cement manufacturer in France, linked to the treatment plants of the rollers of the valley of Paillon. Fishing activities remain but the number of professional fishermen is now less than 10. Nice, being the point of continental France nearest to Corsica, has ferry connections with the island developed with the arrival of NGV (navires à grande vitesse) or high-speed craft. The connections are provided by Corsica Ferries - Sardinia Ferries. Located in front of the port, the Place Cassini has been renamed Place of Corsica.

==== Airport ====
Nice Côte d'Azur Airport is the third busiest airport in France after Charles de Gaulle Airport and Orly Airport, both near Paris. It is on the Promenade des Anglais, near l'Arénas and has two terminals. Due to its proximity to the Principality of Monaco, it also serves as that city–state's airport. A helicopter service provided by Heli Air Monaco and Monacair links the city and airport. It is run by the ACA (Aéroports Côte d'Azur), which includes Cannes – Mandelieu Airport and La Môle – Saint-Tropez Airport. Public transportation into the city proper is serviced by the Tramway line 2 (T2).

==== Rail ====
The main railway station is Nice-Ville, served both by high-speed TGV trains connecting Paris and Nice in less than 6 hours and by local commuter TER services. Marseille is reached in 2.5 hours. Nice also has international connections to Italy, Switzerland, Belgium, and Russia. Nice is also served by several suburban stations including Nice St-Augustin, Nice St-Roch, Nice Pont-Michel and Nice Riquier.

Nice is also the southern terminus of the independently run Chemins de Fer de Provence railway line which connects the city with Digne in approximately 4 hours from the Nice CP station. A metro-like suburban service is also provided on the southern part of the line.

==== Tram ====
Tramway de Nice began operating horse-drawn trams in 1879. Electrified in 1900, the combined length of the network reached 144 km (89 1/2 mi) by 1930. The replacement of trams with trolleybuses began in 1948 and was completed in 1953.

In 2007, the new Tramway de Nice linked the northern and eastern suburbs via the city centre. Two other lines are currently operating. The second line runs east–west from Jean Médecin to the Nice Côte d'Azur Airport and reaches the Port, while the third line provides a connection to the future TGV Nice Saint-Augustin and to Lingostière railway station. A fourth line is set to run from the future TGV Nice Saint-Augustin to Cagnes-sur-Mer.

==== Road ====
The A8 autoroute and the Route nationale 7 pass through the Nice agglomeration.

==== Sports and entertainment ====
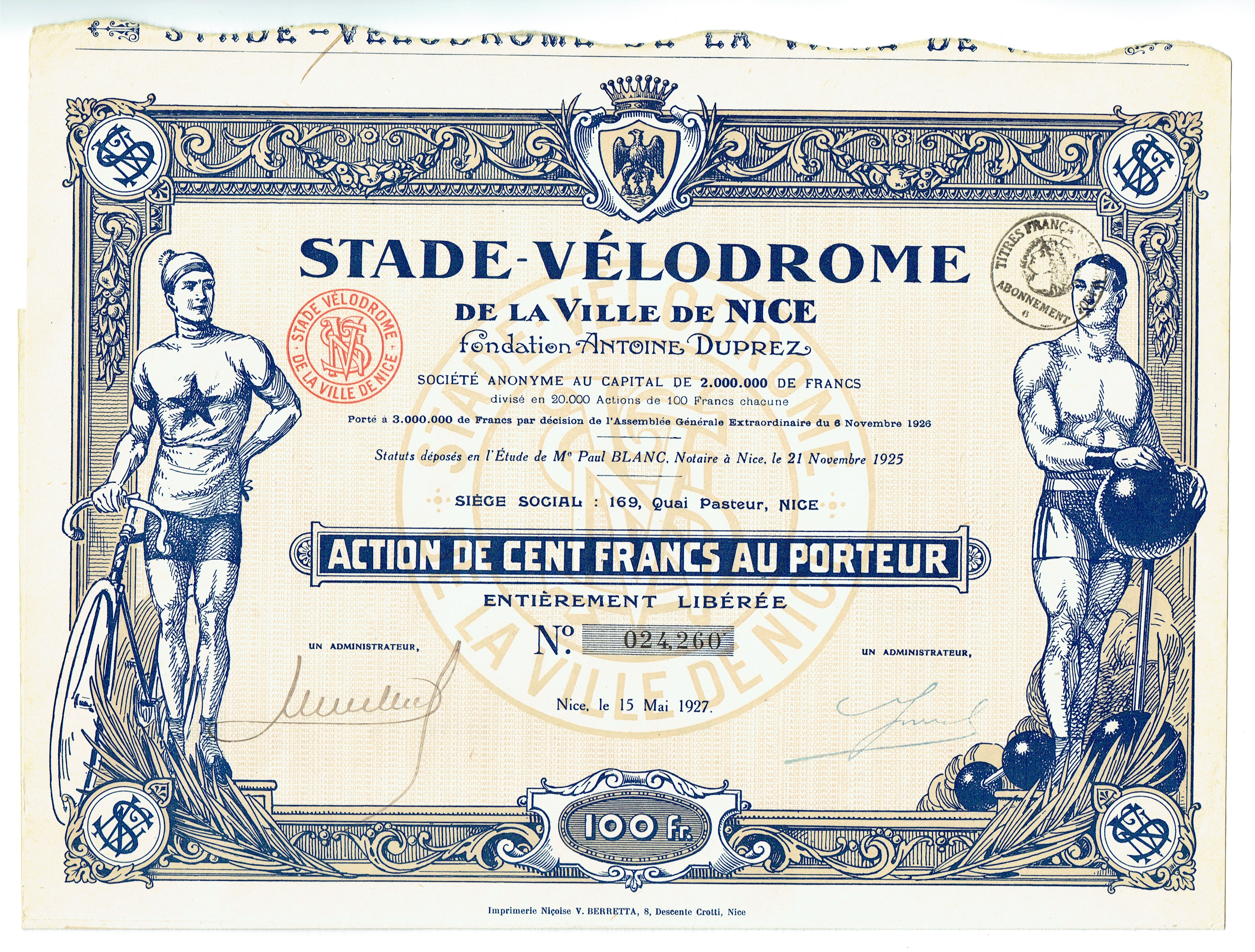
Share of the Stade-Vélodrome da la Ville de Nice, issued 15 May 1927

- Stade du Ray (demolished)
- Allianz Riviera
- Stade Charles-Ehrmann
- Stade Marcel-Volot
- Palais Nikaïa
- Nice Jazz Festival
- Nice Carnival
- Tour de France
- Summer Olympics

== Sport ==
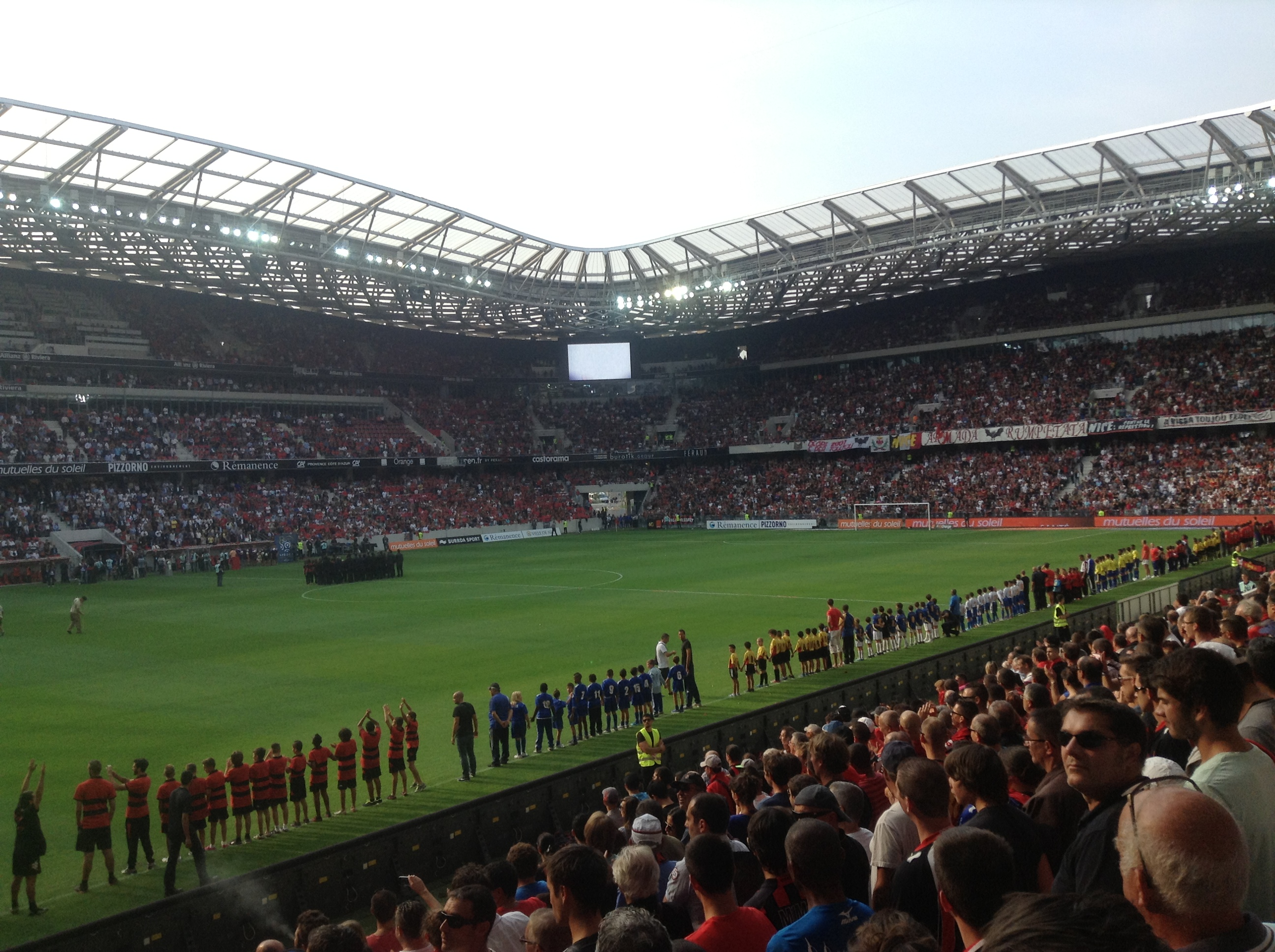
Allianz Riviera

- The city's major football club is OGC Nice. They play in Ligue 1 (the top division in France).
- The Olympic Nice swimming club (French: Olympic Nice Natation) is also notable; Camille Muffat and Yannick Agnel trained there.
- Nice hosts the finish of the annual cycling race Paris–Nice.
- The Nice Hockey Élite club play in Ligue Magnus, the top men's division of the French ice hockey pyramid.
- The Stade Niçois is a rugby club playing in Fédérale 1.

== Population ==
Historical population

Year	Pop.	±% p.a.
1793	24,117	—
1800	18,475	−3.74%
1806	19,783	+1.15%
1822	25,231	+1.53%
1838	33,811	+1.85%
1848	39,000	+1.44%
1858	44,091	+1.23%
1861	48,273	+3.07%
1866	50,180	+0.78%
1872	52,377	+0.72%
1876	53,397	+0.48%
1881	66,279	+4.42%
1886	77,478	+3.17%
1891	88,273	+2.64%
1896	93,760	+1.21%
1901	105,109	+2.31%
1906	134,232	+5.01%
1911	142,940	+1.27%

Year	Pop.	±% p.a.
1921	155,839	+0.87%
1926	184,441	+3.43%
1931	219,549	+3.55%
1936	241,916	+1.96%
1946	211,165	−1.35%
1954	244,360	+1.84%
1962	292,958	+2.29%
1968	322,442	+1.61%
1975	344,481	+0.95%
1982	337,085	−0.31%
1990	342,439	+0.20%
1999	343,123	+0.02%
2007	348,721	+0.20%
2012	343,629	−0.29%
2017	340,017	−0.21%
2023	357,737	+0.85%
2026	368,553	+1.00%

Source: EHESS and INSEE

As of 2018, the urban area (unité urbaine) of Nice, defined by INSEE, was home to 944,321 inhabitants (seventh most populous in France) and its metropolitan area (aire urbaine) totaled 609,695 inhabitants, which made it the 13th largest in France. Part of the urban area of Nice belongs to the metropolitan area of Cannes–Antibes.

Since the 1970s, the number of inhabitants has not changed significantly; the relatively high migration to Nice is balanced by a natural negative growth of the population.

== Observatory ==
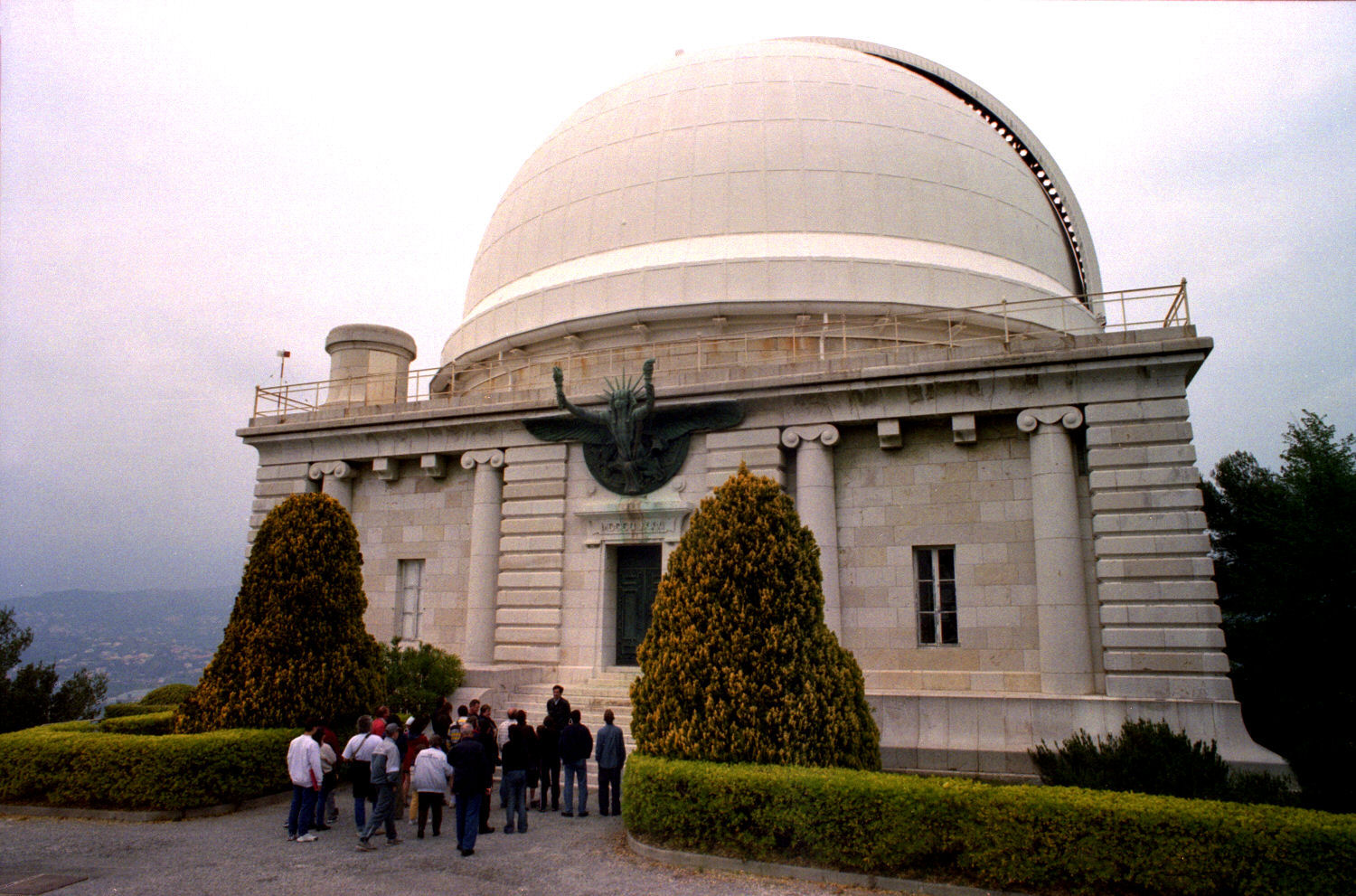
View of the Bischoffsheim cupola, the main cupola of Nice Observatory

The Observatoire de Nice (Nice Observatory) is located on the summit of Mont Gros. The observatory was established in 1879 by the banker Raphaël Bischoffsheim. The architect was Charles Garnier; Gustave Eiffel designed the main dome.

The 76-cm (30-inch) refractor telescope that became operational in 1888 was at that time the world's largest telescope.

== Culture ==
Terra-Amata, an archaeological site dating from the Lower Palaeolithic age, is situated near Nice. Nice itself was established by the ancient Greeks. There was also an independent Roman city, Cemenelum, near Nice, where the hill of Cimiez is located.

Since the 2nd century AD, the light of the city has attracted painters and sculptors such as Chagall, Matisse, Niki de Saint Phalle, Klein, Arman and Sosno. Nice inspired many composers and intellectuals in different countries e.g. Berlioz, Rossini, Nietzsche, etc.

Nice also has numerous museums of all kinds: Musée Marc Chagall, Musée Matisse, Musée des Beaux-Arts, Musée international d'Art naïf Anatole Jakovsky, Musée Terra-Amata, Museum of Asian Art, Musée d'art moderne et d'art contemporain (which devotes much space to the well-known École of Nice), Museum of Natural History, Musée Masséna, Naval Museum and Galerie des Ponchettes.

Being a vacation resort, Nice hosts many festivals throughout the year, such as the Nice Carnival and the Nice Jazz Festival.

Nice has a distinct culture due to its unique history. The local language Niçard (Nissart) is an Occitan dialect (but some Italian scholars argue that it is a Ligurian dialect). The dialect is still spoken by a small minority as of the 21st century, and incorporated into art or street signs. Strong Italian and (to a lesser extent) Corsican influences make it more intelligible to speakers of Italian than other extant Provençal dialects.

In the past, Nice has welcomed many immigrants from Italy (who continue to make up a large proportion of the population), as well as Spaniards and Portuguese. In the past few decades immigration has been opened to include immigrants from all over the world, particularly those from former Northern and Western African colonies, as well as Southeast Asia. Traditions are still alive, especially in folk music and dances, including the farandole – an open-chain community dance.

Since 1860 a cannon (based at the Château east of Old Nice) is shot at twelve o'clock sharp. The detonation can be heard almost all over the city. This tradition goes back to Sir Thomas Coventry, who intended to remind the citizens of having lunch on time.

=== Cuisine ===
The cuisine of Nice is especially close to those of Provence but also Liguria and Piedmont and uses local ingredients (olive oil, anchovies, fruit and vegetables) but also those from more remote regions, in particular from Northern Europe, because ships which came to pick up olive oil arrived full of food products, such as dried haddock.

The local cuisine is rich in around 200 recipes. Most famous include the local tart made with onions and anchovies (or anchovy paste), named "Pissaladière" and derived from the ligurian pissalandrea, a sort of pizza. Socca is a type of pancake made from chickpea flour. Farcis niçois is a dish made from vegetables stuffed with a mixture of breadcrumbs, meat (generally sausage and ground beef), and herbs; and salade niçoise is a tomato salad with baked eggs, tuna or anchovies, olives and often lettuce. Green peppers, vinaigrette, and other raw green vegetables may be included. Potatoes and green beans are not traditional components.

Local meat comes from neighbouring valleys, such as the sheep of Sisteron. Local fish, such as mullets, bream, sea urchins, anchovies and poutine/gianchetti are used to a great extent, so much so that it has given birth to a proverb: "fish are born in the sea and die in oil".

Examples of Niçois specialties include:

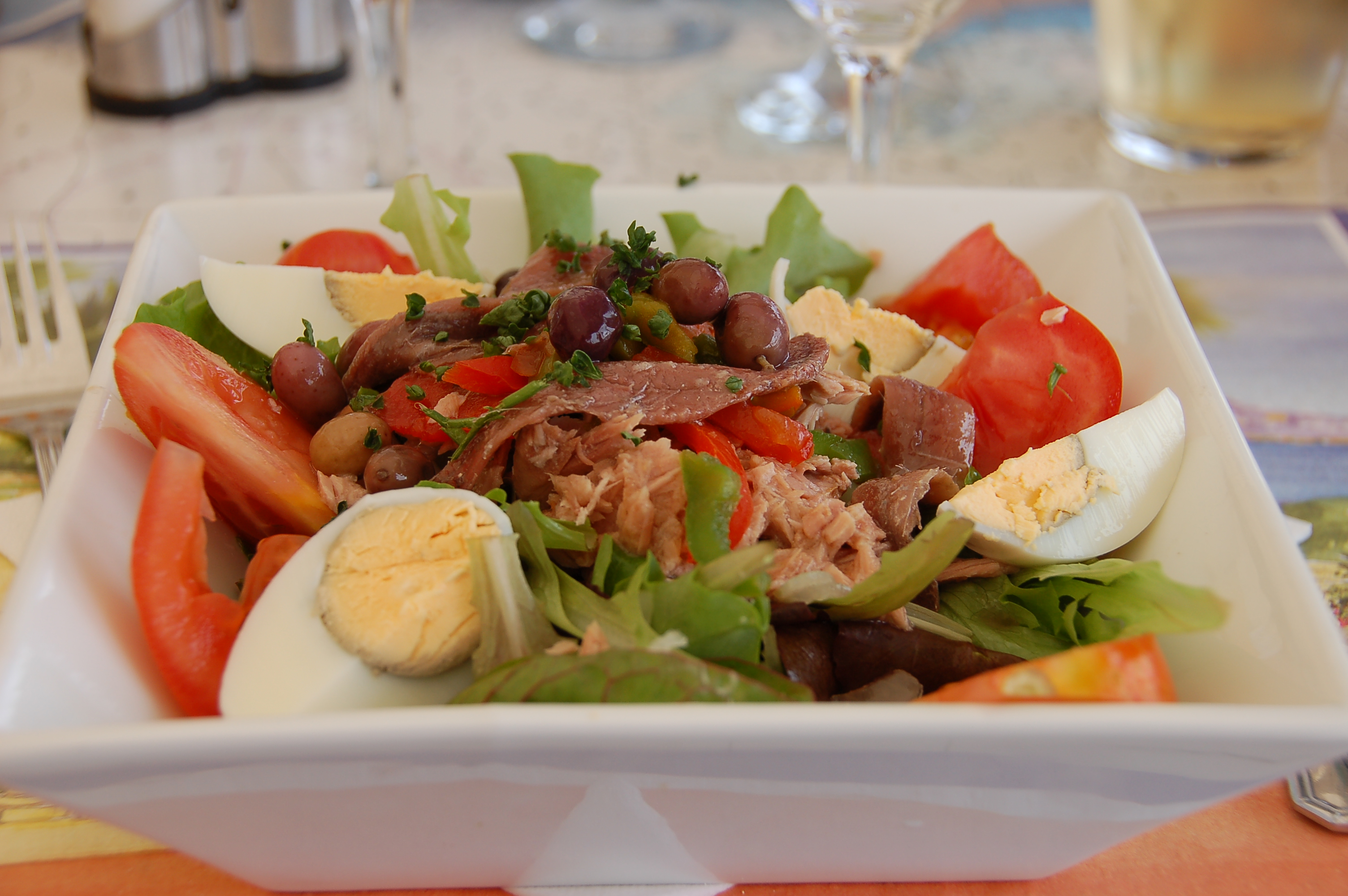
Salade niçoise

- Salade niçoise
- Pan-bagnat
- Ratatouille
- Daube
- Pissaladière
- Socca
- Barbajuan
- Tapenade
- Fougasse

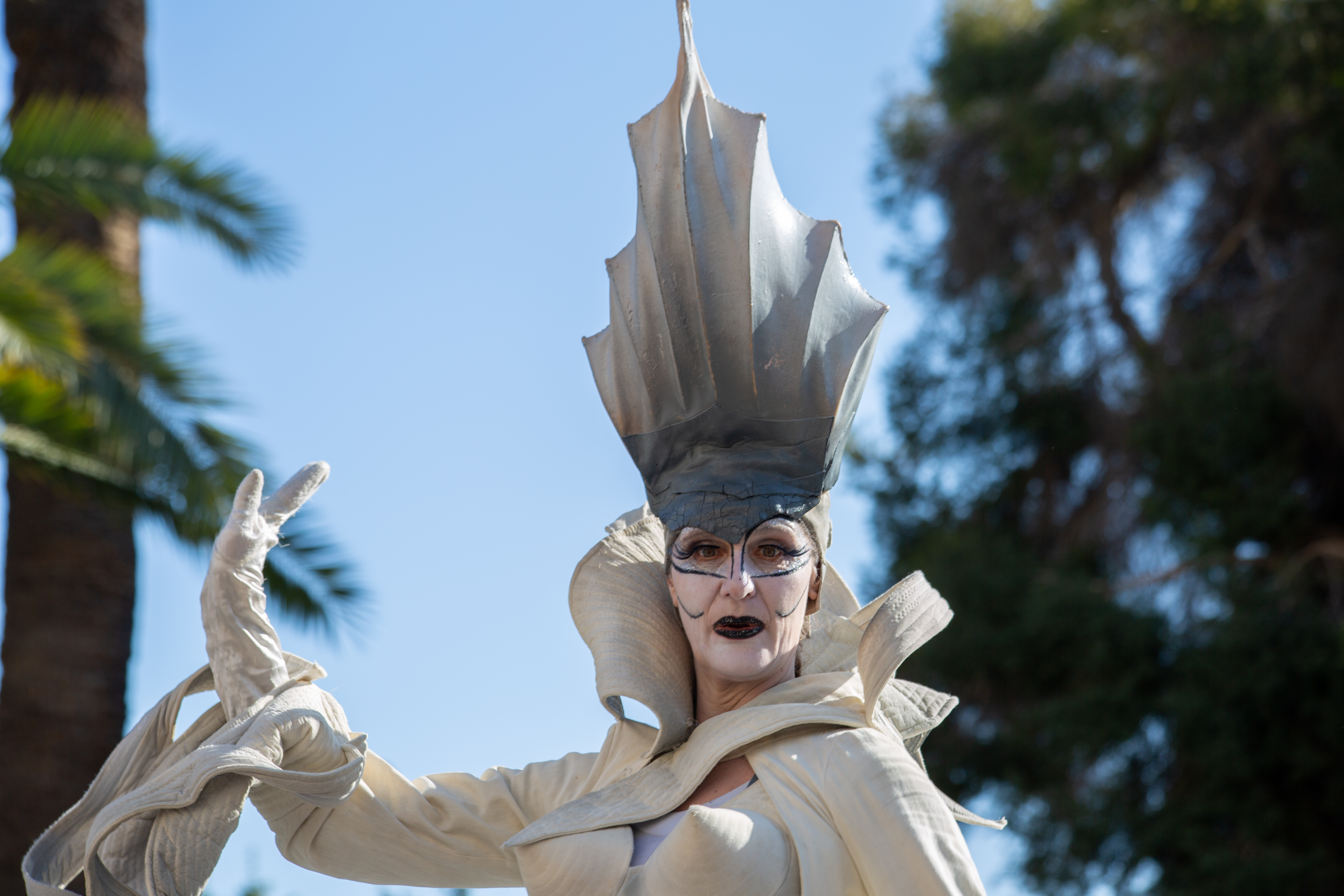
Flower parade

== Education ==
- Côte d'Azur University
- Institut Eurécom
- École des hautes études commerciales du nord
- École pour l'informatique et les nouvelles technologies
- Villa Arson
- ESRA film school
- Institut supérieur européen de formation par l'action
- IPAG Business School
- Supinfo
- Skema Business School
- Lycée Masséna
- Lycée Albert-Calmette

== International relations ==
Nice is twinned with:

- Alicante, Spain
- Antananarivo, Madagascar
- Astana, Kazakhstan
- Can Tho, Vietnam
- Cartagena, Colombia
- Cuneo, Italy
- (United Kingdom) Edinburgh, UK
- Gdańsk, Poland
- Hangzhou, China
- Houston, United States
- Kamakura, Japan
- Laval, Canada
- Libreville, Gabon
- Locarno, Switzerland
- Louisiana (state), United States
- Manila, Philippines
- Miami, United States
- Netanya, Israel
- (France) Nouméa, New Caledonia
- Nuremberg, Germany
- Papeete, France
- Phuket, Thailand
- Rio de Janeiro, Brazil
- Saint-Denis, France
- Saint Petersburg, Russia
- Santa Cruz de Tenerife, Spain
- Sorrento, Italy
- Szeged, Hungary
- Thessaloniki, Greece
- Xiamen, China
- Yalta, Ukraine
- Yerevan, Armenia

== Notable people ==
- Nicholas Alexandrovich (1843–1865) – Tsesarevich, the heir apparent, of Imperial Russia died in Nice and was patron of the Russian Orthodox Cemetery, Nice
- Louis Aragon (1897–1982) – Poet and novelist and his wife, the Russian-born writer Elsa Triolet, lived clandestinely in Nice during World War II
- The Avener (born 1987) – musical artist and DJ, born in Nice
- Jean Behra (1921–1959) – racing driver, born in Nice
- Elliot Benchetrit (born 1998) – tennis player
- Freda Betti (1924–1979) – opera singer
- Henri Betti (1917–2005) – composer and pianist
- Priscilla Betti (born 1989) – singer and actress
- Jules Bianchi (1989–2015) – Formula 1 Driver
- Surya Bonaly (born 1973) – figure skater
- Jean-Philippe Bonardi (born 1970) – French and Swiss university professor
- Alexy Bosetti (born 1993) – footballer
- Loïc Bruni (born 1994) professional downhill mountain biker
- Albert Calmette (1863–1933) – physician, bacteriologist and immunologist
- René Cassin (1887–1976) – jurist, law professor and judge, former student of Nice's Lycée Massena, he received the Nobel Peace Prize in 1968
- Henry Cavendish (1731–1810) – British scientist noted for his discovery of hydrogen
- Éric Ciotti (born 1965) – politician, born in Nice
- Alfred Van Cleef – jeweler buried in Nice at the Cimetière du Château
- Alizé Cornet (born 1990) – tennis player
- Joseph Dadoune (born 1975) – visual artist
- Marc Duret (born 1957) – French-American actor and director, starring in The Big Blue, La Femme Nikita, La haine, Borgia, Outlander, born in Nice
- Christian Estrosi (born 1955) – born in Nice, mayor from 2008 to 2016 and again since 2017
- Jacqueline Eymar (1922–2008) – classical pianist
- Feder (born 1987) – musical artist and DJ, born in Nice
- Léon Gambetta (1838–1881) – politician, buried in Nice
- Giuseppe Garibaldi (1807–1882) – Italian general, politician and patriot, a founding father of Italy, born in Nice
- René Goscinny (1926–1977) – Asterix creator, buried in Nice
- François Grosso (1847–1939) – businessman and philanthropist.
- José Gustavo Guerrero (1876–1958) – first president of the International Court of Justice buried in Nice at Cimetière du Château
- Emily Hallifax (born 2005) – diver
- James C Harris (1831–1904) – 19th century British consul at Nice; painted many scenes in and around the city
- Dominic Howard (born 1977) – drummer for Muse currently lives in Nice
- Cyprien Iov (born 1989) – known simply as Cyprien, comedian and actor with a large YouTube channel, born in Nice
- Dominique Jean-Zéphirin (born 1982) – footballer
- Emil Jellinek-Mercedes (1853–1918) – General Counsel for Austria-Hungary, and founder of Mercedes car company buried in Nice at Cimetière du Château
- Elton John (born 1947) – singer, owned a house in Mont Boron on the hills of Nice
- David Kadouch (born 1985), pianist and chamber musician
- Alexis Kossenko (born 1977) – classical flautist and conductor
- Georges Lautner (1926–2013) – director born in Nice, buried in the cemetery of the Castle
- J. M. G. Le Clézio (born 1940) – author and professor, was awarded the 2008 Nobel Prize in Literature
- Hugo Lloris (born 1986) – French international footballer, born in Nice
- Jacques Loew (1908–1999) – French worker-priest, born and raised in Nice
- Heinrich Mann (1871–1950) – German novelist (and brother of Thomas Mann) lived in Nice
- André Masséna (1758–1817) – 1st Duc de Rivoli, 1st Prince d'Essling, one of the original 18 Marshals of the Empire, French military commander during the Revolutionary and Napoleonic Wars, his nickname was l'Enfant chéri de la Victoire ("the Dear Child of Victory")
- Jean Médecin (1890–1965) - Lawyer, politician and Mayor of Nice.
- Jean-Pierre Mocky (1929–2019) – film director, actor, screenwriter and producer
- Amedeo Modigliani (1884–1920) – lived for a few months in Nice with his companion Jeanne Hébuterne; she gave birth to their daughter Giovanna in 1918.
- Mohammed VI (born 1963) – king of Morocco, obtained the title of Doctor of Law at the University of Nice Sophia Antipolis
- Jacques Ochs (1883–1971) – artist and Olympic fencing champion
- Oria – singer, certified platinum artist
- Clairemarie Osta (born 1970) – ballet dancer, étoile at Paris Opera Ballet
- Pino Presti (born 1943) – Italian bassist, arranger, composer, conductor and record producer, lived in Nice
- Fabio Quartararo (born 1999) – French MotoGP World Champion
- Auguste Renoir (1841–1919) – had his studio in Nice from 1911 to 1919 at the corner of the Rue Alfred Mortier and the Quai St Jean Baptiste. A commemorative plaque is affixed to it.
- Dick Rivers (1945–2019)– born Hervé Forneri, rock singer, born in Nice
- Ken Samaras (born 1990) – known as Nekfeu, French rapper, born in the suburbs of Nice
- Sylvie Selig (born 1941) – Visual artist
- Robert W. Service (1874–1958) – poet and writer of the Klondike Gold Rush lived in Nice during the summers from 1916 to 1940
- Joann Sfar (born 1971) – comics artist, comic book creator and film director
- Michel Siffre (1939–2024) – adventurer and scientist
- Gilles Simon (born 1984) – tennis player
- Michael Sinterniklaas (born 1972) – voice actor
- Aimé Teisseire (1914–2008) – French Army officer, lived in Nice after his retirement from the military until his death at the age of 93
- Ben Vautier (1935–2024) – artist
- Simone Veil (1927–2017) – lawyer and politician who served as Minister of Health, President of the European Parliament and member of the Constitutional Council of France; survivor of the Auschwitz-Birkenau concentration camp, born in Nice
- Queen Victoria (1819–1901) – Queen of the United Kingdom of Great Britain and Ireland, Empress of India, stayed many winters in Nice
- Valérie Zenatti (born 1970) – writer
- Nguyễn Văn Xuân (1892–1989), French Army general and Vietnamese politician, lived in France in later life until he died in Nice at the age of 96

=== Honorary citizens ===
Charles III, then Prince of Wales, received honorary citizenship of Nice on 8 May 2018.

== See also ==
- 37th G8 summit
- Charles-Léonce Brossé
- Cimetière du Château
- European Institute of High International Studies
- Jean-Louis Turquin case
- Le Méridien
- Nice biscuit
- Rugby Nice Côte d'Azur Université-Racing
- Russian Orthodox Cemetery, Nice
- Albert Spaggiari
