= Baréty =

Baréty may refer to:

== People with the surname ==
- Alexandre Baréty (1844–1918), French physician
- Jean-Paul Baréty (1928–2018), French politician
- Léon Baréty (1883–1971), French politician

== Places ==
- Palais Baréty, historic building in France
