= Charles Ehrmann =

French politician (1911–2011)

Charles Ehrmann (7 October 1911 – 8 August 2011) was a French politician. A member of the Union for French Democracy (UDF), he was a deputy in the National Assembly from 1976 to 1981 and from 1986 to 2002, as well as a city councillor in Nice from 1965 to 1983.

== Biography ==
Ehrmann was born in Paris to a family from Alsace, who had moved there in 1871 after their home region was annexed by Germany in the aftermath of the Franco-Prussian War. His father was killed in the First Battle of the Marne in the early stages of World War I in 1914.

Ehrmann was a teacher of history and geography at the Lycée Masséna in Nice, exercising his profession between 1937 and 1975. He was a city councillor in Nice from 1965 to 1983, serving as the councillor in charge of sports in the administrations of father and son mayors Jean and Jacques Médecin. He was a general councillor of the department of Alpes-Maritimes from 1973 to 2002. The Stade Charles-Ehrmann in Nice bears his name.

In February 1976, Ehrmann replaced Jacques Médecin as deputy in the National Assembly for Alpes-Maritimes's 2nd constituency, as the latter was nominated for government. In the 1978 French legislative election, he was elected by the 1st constituency of the department, but lost his seat in 1981 to Max Gallo of the Socialist Party, winning it back in 1986. He held the seat until 2002, and was the oldest member of the 10th and 11th legislatures. In his final years in parliament, his party was Liberal Democracy (DL). He was also a member of the Parliamentary Assembly of the Council of Europe from 1993 to 2002.

Ehrmann died on 8 August 2011, aged 99. Mayor Christian Estrosi of Nice remembered him as a "great humanist, pupil of the nation, deeply European and impassioned defender of the cause of sport".
