= Danielle Tubiana =

French politician (born 1950)

French Senator
- Preceded by: Colette Giudicelli
- Parliamentary group: RASNAG
- Constituency: Alpes-Maritimes

Personal details
- Born: May 2, 1950

Danielle Tubiana (Note: Sometimes spelled Danièle Tubiana.) (born May 2, 1950) is a French politician, a member of the New Centre and the UDI. After a career in local politics, she briefly served as a senator representing the Alpes-Maritimes.

== Political career ==
A member of the Union for French Democracy, Danielle Tubiana was elected as a municipal councillor of Grasse in the 2001 French municipal elections. She was re-elected in 2008 and served as deputy mayor, in charge of social and family affairs, and public services for at least part of her last term. She did not run for re-election in the 2014 municipal elections.

Tubiana ran on the center-right coalition list led by Renaud Muselier for the 2004 regional elections in Provence-Alpes-Côte d'Azur, and was elected as a member of the opposition. During her term, the UDF was dissolved into the MoDem. She ran again, for the presidential majority, in the 2010 regional elections in Provence-Alpes-Côte d'Azur, on the list led by Thierry Mariani. She served another term as part of the opposition.

In the 2012 legislative elections, she was the substitute candidate for Charles-Ange Ginésy, who ran as the UMP candidate in the 2nd constituency of Alpes-Maritimes. Ginésy was elected in the second round with 53.29% of the vote.

In the 2014 French Senate elections in Alpes-Maritimes, Tubiana was number five on the presidential majority list led by Dominique Estrosi Sassone. Only three senators were elected, but the fourth candidate, Henri Leroy, was elected mid-term. The death of Colette Giudicelli led Tubiana to enter the French Senate for six days. She did not run in the 2020 Senate elections held around the same time.
