= Martine Daugreilh =

French politician and essayist

Member of the National Assembly for Alpes-Maritimes's 2nd constituency
- In office 23 June 1988 – 1 April 1993
- Preceded by: Jacques Médecin
- Succeeded by: Christian Estrosi

Personal details
- Born: Martine Gasquet; 11 August 1947 (age 78) Talence, Gironde, France
- Party: Rally for the Republic
- Occupation: Politician

Martine Daugreilh (née Gasquet; 11 September 1947) is a French politician and essayist. She was Member of Parliament for Alpes-Maritimes's 2nd constituency from 1988 to 1933 and was the first woman elected MP in Nice. Most recently she was responsible for the Mediterranean University Centre.

== Biography ==
Daugreilh is a professor of history and geography by training, and was close to the former mayor of Nice Jacques Médecin.

In the 1988 French legislative election she was elected to the National Assembly in Alpes-Maritimes's 2nd constituency under the label Rally for the Republic (RPR) with 63.61% of the votes in the second round against the socialist candidate Patrick Mottard (36.39 %). In October 1988, she tabled with forty-two of her colleagues a bill aimed at restoring the death penalty for certain crimes.

During the 1992 regional elections, she decided to run on a different list from that of her party, but failed to be elected. Its various right list entitled "Sauvons Nice" and bringing together socio-professionals, only collected 1.68% of the votes in the Alpes-Maritimes and 3% in Nice. In the 1993 French legislative election she did not stand for re-election in her constituency, thus leaving the field open to Christian Estrosi, designated by L'Express as being her “intimate enemy”.

She was secretary general of the Nice circle of the Club de l'horloge.

At the end of the 2000s and until 2012, she directed the Mediterranean University Center in Nice, a place of cultural and intellectual exchange founded in 1933 by Jean Médecin, of whom Paul Valéry was a director. She holds the position of deputy director general of cultural development for the town hall of Nice.

In 2012, she was made a Knight of Arts et Lettres.

=== Personal life ===
She was the wife of Jean-Pierre Daugreilh, one of the members of the Groupement de recherche et d'études pour la civilisation européenne, which had deposited its statutes in 1969, who later became regional councillor for the Front national in Provence-Alpes-Côte d'Azur.
