= Jean-Paul Baréty =

French lawyer and politician

Mayor of Nice
- In office 29 October 1993 – 25 June 1995
- Preceded by: Honoré Bailet
- Succeeded by: Jacques Peyrat

Member of the National Assembly for Alpes-Maritimes's 2nd constituency
- In office 13 March 1993 – 21 April 1997
- Preceded by: Jacques Peyrat
- Succeeded by: Christian Estrosi

Personal details
- Born: 10 March 1928 Nice, France
- Died: 3 November 2018 (aged 90) France
- Party: RPR
- Parent: Léon Baréty (father)
- Relatives: Alexandre Baréty (paternal grandfather)
- Profession: Lawyer

Jean-Paul Baréty (10 March 1928 – 3 November 2018) was a French lawyer and politician. He served as a member of the National Assembly from 1994 to 1997, representing Alpes-Maritimes.

== Biography ==
After an early career as a lawyer, Baréty entered politics and joined the Rally for the Republic (RPR). He was elected Mayor of Nice in 1993 and served until 1995. He was also elected as a deputy in the 2nd electoral district of Alpes-Maritimes, replacing Christian Estrosi. He served until 1997.

He was also the president of Acadèmia Nissarda from 1978 until his death.

Baréty was awarded as a Knight of the Legion of Honour in 1993.
