= Loïc Dombreval =

French politician

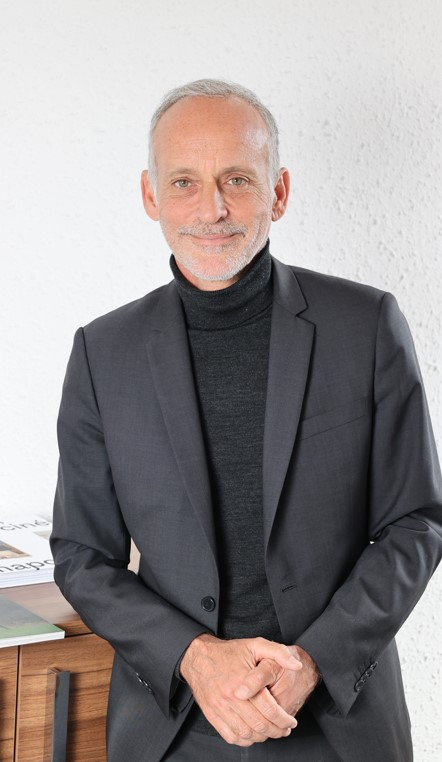

Member of the National Assembly for Alpes-Maritimes's 2nd constituency
- In office 21 June 2017 – 22 June 2022
- Preceded by: Charles-Ange Ginésy
- Succeeded by: Lionel Tivoli

Personal details
- Born: 16 April 1966 (age 60) Boulogne-Billancourt, France
- Party: La République En Marche!
- Education: University of Burgundy

Loïc Dombreval (born 16 April 1966) is a French veterinarian and politician of La République En Marche! (LREM) who served a single term (2017-2022) in the French National Assembly, representing the 2nd constituency of the department of Alpes-Maritimes.

== Early career ==
Dombreval worked as a veterinarian from 1990 until 1995 before taking on the position of communications director at Virbac's French subsidiary in 1995. From 1999 to 2000, he was a strategy consultant at Capgemini.

== Political career ==
Having previously been an active member of the Democratic Movement (MoDem), Dombreval joined LREM in 2017.

In parliament, Dombreval served on the Committee on Sustainable Development and Spatial Planning. In this capacity, he was the parliament's rapporteur on animal welfare and rights in France, including a 2021 ban on the use of wild animals in live circus shows.

In addition to his committee assignments, Dombreval was a member of the French-Namibian Parliamentary Friendship Group.

In the 2022 elections Dombreval lost in the second round to Lionel Tivoli of National Rally.

== Political positions ==
In July 2019, Dombreval decided not to align with his parliamentary group's majority and became one of 52 LREM members who abstained from a vote on the French ratification of the European Union’s Comprehensive Economic and Trade Agreement (CETA) with Canada.

In 2021, Dombreval led efforts to ban the practice of marmot hunting in France.

== See also ==
- 2017 French legislative election
