= Militello (surname) =

Militello is an Italian surname from Sicily, derived from several local place names. Notable people with this surname include:

- Bobby Militello (born 1950), American jazz saxophonist and flautist
- Jennifer Militello, American academic, writer and poet
- Muriel Marland-Militello (1943–2021), French politician
- Sam Militello (born 1969), American baseball player

== See also ==
- Joanna of Austria, Marchioness of Militello (1573–1630)
- Militello (disambiguation)
