= André Aschieri =

French politician (1937–2021)

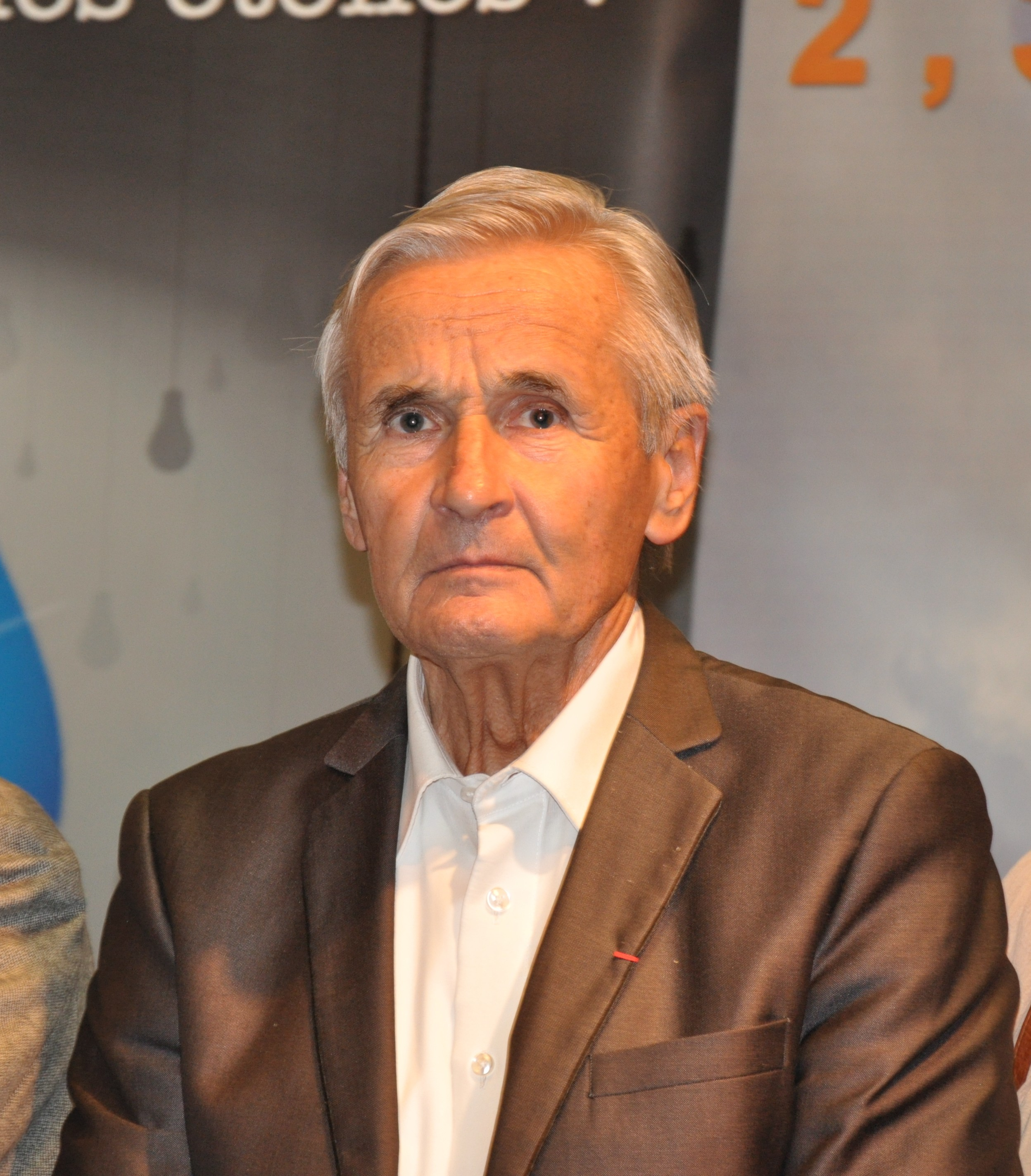
- Aschieri in 2012

Vice-President of Land and Housing of the Regional Council of Provence-Alpes-Côte d'Azur
- In office 28 March 2004 – 13 December 2015
- Succeeded by: Roger Didier

Member of the French National Assembly
- In office 12 June 1997 – 18 June 2002
- Preceded by: Pierre Bachelet
- Succeeded by: Michèle Tabarot
- Constituency: Alpes-Maritimes's 9th constituency

Mayor of Mouans-Sartoux
- In office 22 December 1974 – 21 May 2015
- Succeeded by: Pierre Aschieri

Personal details
- Born: 8 March 1937 Mouans-Sartoux, France
- Died: 6 December 2021 (aged 84) Mouans-Sartoux, France
- Party: LV

André Aschieri (8 March 1937 – 6 December 2021) was a French politician. He served as mayor of Mouans-Sartoux from 1974 to 2015, was a member of the National Assembly from 1997 to 2002, and was Vice-President of Land and Housing of the Regional Council of Provence-Alpes-Côte d'Azur from 2004 to 2015. He was the founder of the Agence française de sécurité sanitaire and was a member of the Grenelle Environnement.

== Biography ==
Aschieri carried out his military service in the Algerian War from 1960 to 1962. Beginning his career as a math teacher, he was elected to the Municipal Council of Mouans-Sartoux in 1971. He became mayor in 1974 and was continuously re-elected in the first round of each election. As mayor, he became Vice-President of the Pôle Azur Provence upon its foundation in 2001.

From the end of the 1980s until the project's abandonment in the late 1990s, Aschieri supported the expansion of the A8 autoroute through Grasse and the Pays vençois. In the 1990s, he opposed a large real estate project around the Siagne and largely contributed to the reopening of the Ligne de Cannes-la-Bocca à Grasse. On 22 March 1992, he was elected to the Regional Council of Provence-Alpes-Côte d'Azur, although he resigned in 1995.

Aschieri was elected to the National Assembly in Alpes-Maritimes's 9th constituency on 1 June 1997 as part of The Greens (LV). While in office, he created the Agence française de sécurité sanitaire (AFSSET), inspired by the creation of the Établissement français du sang and the Institut de radioprotection et de sûreté nucléaire. He became Vice-President of AFSSET in 2003. He was particularly interested in the impacts of electromagnetic radiation on human health and the environment. In 2002, he was defeated in the second round by Union for a Popular Movement candidate Michèle Tabarot.

Aschieri was again elected to the Regional Council of Provence-Alpes-Côte d'Azur in 2004 and took part in the creation of the Parc naturel régional des Préalpes d'Azur. He was re-elected in 2010 and served as Vice-President of Land and Housing. He therefore resigned as Vice-President of the Pôle Azur Provence. He was also defeated in the 2007 legislative election again by Tabarot, who won in the first round.

Aschieri was a candidate in the 2009 European Parliament election as part of the Europe Ecology group, but failed to gain a seat. In 2012, he ran for the National Assembly as a candidate in Alpes-Maritimes's 2nd constituency. He qualified for the second round against Charles-Ange Ginésy, but was narrowly defeated. However, he was re-elected as mayor of Mouans-Sartoux in 2014 with 70.41% of the vote, becoming Vice-President of the Communauté d'agglomération du Pays de Grasse. However, he resigned from this post in May 2015, citing health reasons. His son, Pierre, succeeded him as mayor and was re-elected in 2020 with 76.86% of the vote.

André Aschieri died in Mouans-Sartoux on 6 December 2021 at the age of 84.

== Publications ==
- La France toxique (1999) ISBN 9782707130679
- Propositions pour un renforcement de la sécurité sanitaire environnementale : rapport au Premier ministre (1999) ISBN 9782110043214
- Alerte sur les portables (2001) ISBN 9782914353205
- Silence, on intoxique ! (2005) ISBN 9782707146380
- Mon combat contre les empoisonneurs (2010) ISBN 9782707164384

== Distinctions ==
- Medal of Youth, Sports and Community Involvement (1982)
- Knight of the Ordre national du Mérite (1985)
- Commander of the Ordre des Arts et des Lettres (2012)
- Officer of the Legion of Honour (2013)
