= Marine Brenier =

French politician (born 1986)

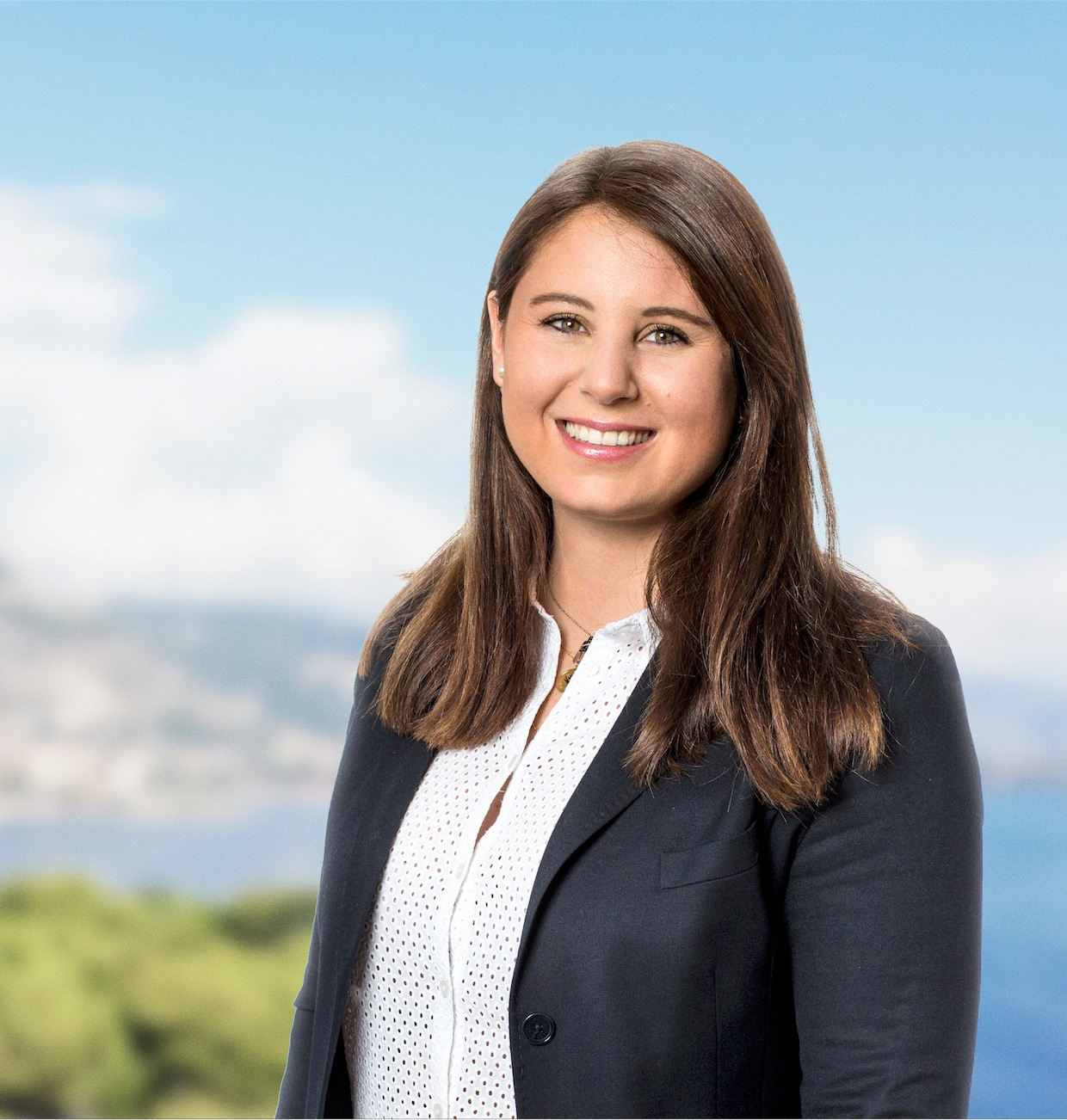
- Marine Brenier in 2017

Municipal councillor of Nice
- Incumbent
- Assumed office 21 March 2008
- Mayor: Christian Estrosi; Philippe Pradal

Member of the National Assembly for Alpes-Maritimes's 5th constituency
- In office 30 May 2016 – 22 June 2022
- Preceded by: Christian Estrosi
- Succeeded by: Christelle d'Intorni

Personal details
- Born: 11 August 1986 (age 40) Nice, France
- Party: UMP (2007-2015); LR (2015-2022); SL (2018-2022); LFA (since 2017); Horizons (since 2022)
- Education: University of Nice Sophia-Antipolis; Aix-Marseille University
- Profession: Jurist

Marine Brenier-Ohanessian (born 11 August 1986) is a French politician who served as a member of the French National Assembly from 2016 to 2022, representing the 5th constituency of the department of Alpes-Maritimes. She is a member of two political center-right parties, Horizons and La France Audacieuse.

== Political career ==
Brenier joined the UMP in 2007.

In 2008, she was elected municipal councillor of Nice (although she began serving only in 2009), where she was tasked with overseeing sports affairs. In April 2014, she became a territorial deputy mayor of Nice under the leadership of Christian Estrosi. The following year, she was elected as a departmental councillor.

From 2015 to 2017, Brenier served as president of the Young Republicans, succeeding Stéphane Tiki.

In parliament, Brenier served on the Committee on Sustainable Development and Spatial Planning (2016–2017) and the Committee on Social Affairs (2017–2022).

From 2018 to 2022, Brenier was a member of Soyons libres (SL), founded and led by Valérie Pécresse. In 2021, she led a group of LR deputies pushing for more liberal rules on assisted suicide.

Brenier was a candidate in the 2022 legislative elections. Her candidacy was endorsed by Nicolas Sarkozy. She lost her seat to Christelle d'Intorni from the National Rally in the second round.

Following her defeat in the 2022 legislative elections, she returned to her role as deputy mayor of Nice, overseeing Family and Early Childhood affairs.

== See also ==
- List of deputies of the 14th National Assembly of France
- List of deputies of the 15th National Assembly of France
