= Max Gallo =

French writer, historian and politician (1932–2017)

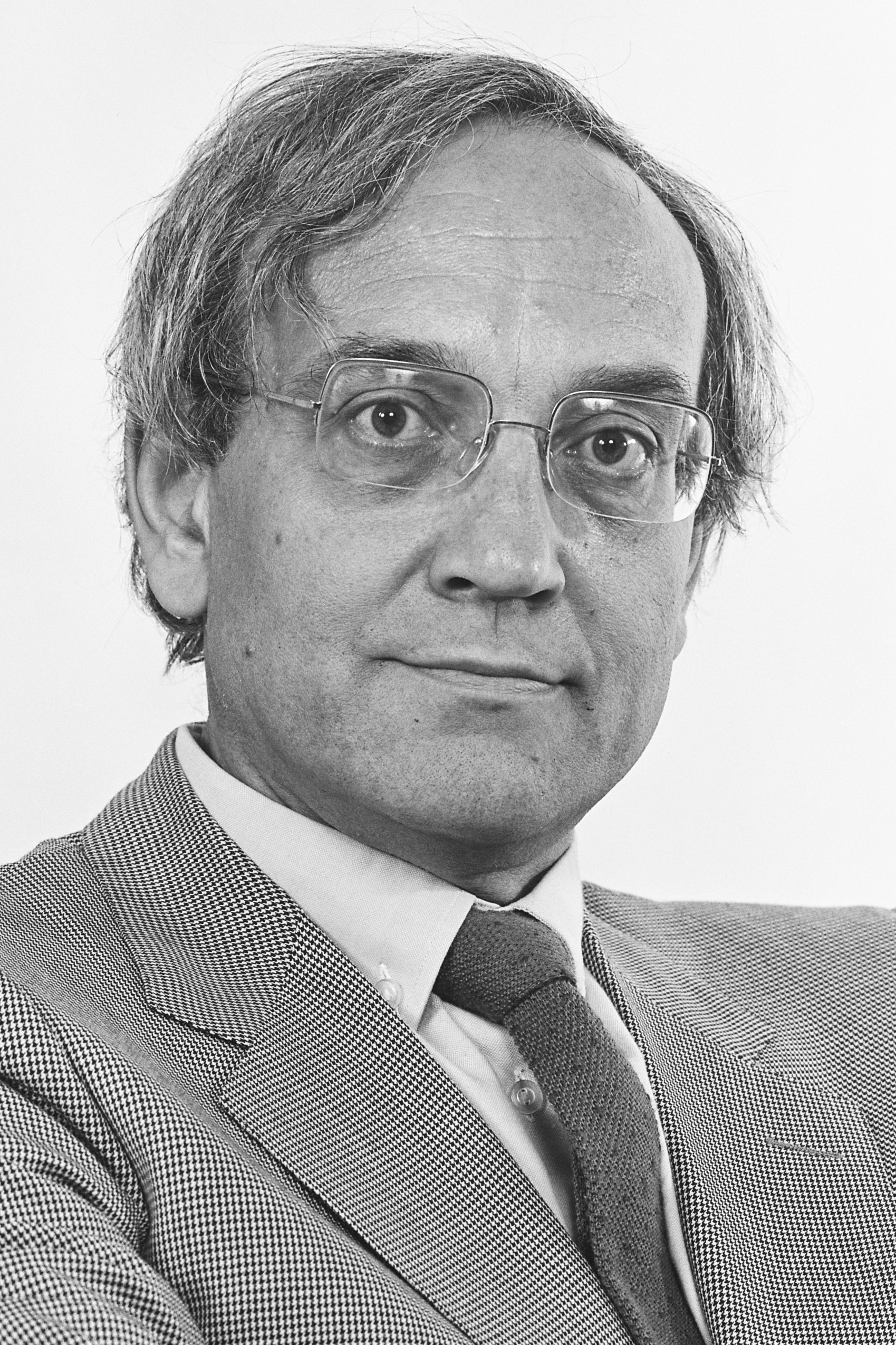
- Gallo in 1984

Member of the European Parliament
- In office 24 July 1984 – 18 July 1994
- Constituency: France

Spokesperson of the Government
- In office 22 March 1983 – 17 July 1984
- Prime Minister: Pierre Mauroy
- Preceded by: André Rossi
- Succeeded by: Roland Dumas

Member of the National Assembly for Alpes-Maritimes's 1st constituency
- In office 21 June 1981 – 22 April 1983
- Preceded by: Charles Ehrmann
- Succeeded by: Francis Giolitti

Personal details
- Born: Max Louis Jules Gallo; 7 January 1932 Nice, France
- Died: 18 July 2017 (aged 85) Vaison-la-Romaine, France
- Party: Socialist Party (1974–1992)
- Spouse: Marielle Gallo
- Profession: Historian

Max Louis Jules Gallo (French: [maks ɡalo]; 7 January 1932 – 18 July 2017) was a French writer, historian and politician. He wrote over one hundred books. He served in the National Assembly (1981–1983), as Spokesperson of the Government under Prime Minister Pierre Mauroy (1983–1984), and in the European Parliament (1984–1994).

The son of Italian immigrants (his father was of Piedmontese descent and his mother was from the region of Parma), Gallo's early career was in journalism. At the time, he was a Communist (until 1956). In 1974, he joined the Socialist Party. In the 1990s he was close to Jean-Pierre Chevènement. On 26 April 2007, the Académie Française recorded his candidacy for its Seat 24, formerly held by the late Jean-François Revel. He was elected to the Académie Française on 31 May 2007.

== Honours ==
- Commander of the Legion of Honour (2009)
- Grand Officer of the Ordre national du Mérite (2013)

== Bibliography ==
- La Cinquième colonne : Et ce fut la défaite de 40 (Français) Broché – 1 septembre 1984
- Le Cortège des vainqueurs, Robert Laffont, 1972
- Un pas vers la mer, Robert Laffont, 1973
- L’Oiseau des origines, Robert Laffont, 1974, Grand prix des lectrices de Elle
- Que sont les siècles pour la mer, Robert Laffont, 1977
- Une affaire intime, Robert Laffont, 1979
- France, Grasset, 1980
- Un crime très ordinaire, Grasset, 1982
- La Demeure des puissants, Grasset, 1983
- Au nom de tous les miens, with Martin Gray, Robert Laffont, 1971
- Le Beau Rivage, Grasset, 1985
- Belle Époque, Grasset, 1986
- La Route Napoléon, Robert Laffont, 1987
- Que Passe la Justice du Roi: Vie, procès et supplice du chevalier de La Barre, Robert Laffont, 1987
- Une affaire publique, Robert Laffont, 1989
- Le Regard des femmes, Robert Laffont, 1991
- Les Fanatiques, Fayard, 2006
- Fier d'être français, Fayard, 2006
- Les Romains: Spartacus, la révolte des esclaves, Fayard, 2006
- L'Italie de Mussolini, Editions Tallandier, 1973
- Dieu le veut, XO éditions, Paris, 2015
- Napoleon

- I. : Le Chant du départ [The Song of Departure] (1769-1799), Robert Laffont, 1997
- II. : Le Soleil d'Austerlitz [The Sun of Austerlitz] (1799-1805), Robert Laffont, 1997
- III. : L'Empereur des rois [The Emperor of Kings] (1806-1812), Robert Laffont, 1997
- IV. : L'Immortel de Sainte-Hélène [The Immortal of St Helena] (1812-1821), Robert Laffont, 1997

== Sources ==
- Jean-Louis de Rambures, "Comment travaillent les écrivains", Paris 1978 (interview with Max Gallo, in French)

Cultural offices
Preceded by Jean-François Revel	Seat 24; Académie Française; 2007–2017	Succeeded by François Sureau
