= La France Audacieuse =

Political party in France

Audacious France La France audacieuse
- Abbreviation: LFA
- President: Christian Estrosi
- Spokesperson: Delphine Bürkli; Arnaud Robinet; Caroline Pozmentier
- Founded: October 14, 2017 (as association); September 22, 2020 (as political party)
- Split from: The Republicans
- Headquarters: 128 rue de la Boétie; 75008 Paris
- Ideology: Neo-Gaullism; Liberal conservatism; Christian democracy; Pro-Europeanism
- Political position: Centre-right
- National Assembly: 0 / 577
- Senate: 1 / 348
- Presidency of Regional Council: 0 / 17
- Mayors of municipalities with more than 30,000 inhabitants: 16 / 279

Website
- https://www.la-france-audacieuse.fr/accueil

Audacious France (French: La France audacieuse, LFA) is a French political party positioned centre-right on the political spectrum.

The movement was founded by Christian Estrosi as a movement of local elected officials in October 2017 with several right-wing personalities such as Jean-Luc Moudenc, mayor of Toulouse; Gil Avérous, mayor of Châteauroux; Alain Chrétien, mayor of Vesoul; and Luc Lemonnier, mayor of Le Havre. LFA became a party in 2020.

== History ==
=== Launch ===
On October 14, 2017, Christian Estrosi, mayor of Nice, launched a movement of local elected officials which he called “France audacieuse”. This name was already that of a civil society think tank, active since 2016, which carries out in-depth studies on sustainable development and the social economy. The launch of Christian Estrosi's movement was therefore marred by accusations of plagiarism, heavily relayed on Twitter and in the media. The object of the association was to "bring a renewal in French political life by organizing the voice of the territories and bringing the voice of citizens to allow the development of a democratic life that is more participatory and more representative".

=== Transformation into a political party ===
On September 22, 2020, Christian Estrosi announced at a general assembly the transformation of his movement into a political party to "make the voice of the territories heard" and "weigh in the political debate".

== Organization ==
Audacious France has three deputies, including two members of the Les Républicains group and one member of the La République en Marche group:

- Yves Hemedinger, elected in the first constituency of Haut-Rhin
- Marine Brenier, elected in the fifth constituency of the Alpes-Maritimes
- Romain Grau, elected in the first constituency of the Pyrénées-Orientales

Audacious France also has two senators, all members of the Les Républicains group:

- Jean Bacci, Mayor of Moissac-Bellevue, Senator from Var
- Françoise Dumont, Senator for Var
