= Alpes-Maritimes's 2nd constituency =

Constituency of the National Assembly of France

2nd constituency of Alpes Maritimes
- inline Constituency of the National Assembly of France

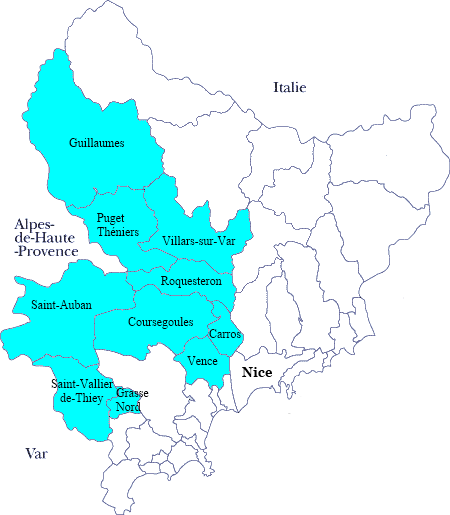
- Constituency in department

- Alpes Maritimes in France
- Deputy: Lionel Tivoli; RN
- Department: Alpes Maritimes
- Cantons: Nice-4, Nice-5, Nice-6, Nice-7

The 2nd constituency of the Alpes Maritimes is a French legislative constituency in the Alpes Maritimes département. Like the other 576 French constituencies, it elects one MP using the two-round system, with a run-off if no candidate receives over 50% of the vote in the first round.

== Geography ==
It covers the centre-west of the city of Nice, and had 99,035 inhabitants at the last count.

== Historic Representation ==
Election	Member	Party
1988	Martine Daugreilh	RPR
1993	Christian Estrosi	RPR
1993	Jean-Paul Baréty	RPR
1997	Jacques Peyrat	RPR
1998	Jacqueline Mathieu-Obadia	RPR
2002	Muriel Marland-Militello	UMP
2007	Muriel Marland-Militello	UMP
2012	Charles Ange Ginésy	UMP
2017	Loïc Dombreval	LREM
2022	Lionel Tivoli	RN
2024	Lionel Tivoli	RN

== Election results ==
=== 2024 ===
Candidate	Party	Alliance	First round		Second round	
Candidate	Party	Alliance	Votes	%	Votes	%
Lionel Tivoli	NR		28,676	48.08	33,273	63.78
Leïla Tonnerre	LFI		11,339	19.01	18,893	36.22
David Varrone	HOR	Ensemble	9,856	16.53		
Simon Daragon	LR	UDC	6,162	10.33		
Patrice Miran	EAC		2,296	3.85		
Indiana Poret-Rinck	EXD		931	1.56		
Florent Imbert	LO		381	0.64		
Valid votes			59,641	97.66	52,166	88.68
Blank votes			996	1.63	5,480	9.32
Null votes			430	0.70	1,176	2.00
Turnout			61,067	67.57	58,822	65.06
Abstentions			29,314	32.43	31,589	34.94
Registered voters			90,381		90,411	
Result			RN HOLD			

=== 2022 ===
Legislative Election 2022: Alpes-Maritimes's 2nd constituency
Party	Candidate	Votes	%	±%
RN	Lionel Tivoli	9,639	23.90	+1.35
LREM (Ensemble)	Loïc Dombreval	9,547	23.67	-11.67
LFI (NUPÉS)	Sonia Naffati	7,591	18.82	+5.32
LR (UDC)	Jean-Marc Macario	5,684	14.09	−6.94
REC	Patrick Isnard	2,930	7.26	N/A
LMR	Abdel Aissou	1,396	3.46	N/A
DVE	Brigitte Reynard	1,269	3.15	−0.57
LP (UPF)	Philippe Morlot	823	2.04	+0.14
Others	N/A	1,457	3.61	
Turnout		40,336	46.18	−2.31
2nd round result
RN	Lionel Tivoli	18,557	51.65	+10.73
LREM (Ensemble)	Loïc Dombreval	17,369	48.35	−10.73
Turnout		35,926	43.80	+1.26
RN gain from LREM				

=== 2017 ===
Candidate	Label	First round		Second round	
Candidate	Label	Votes	%	Votes	%
Loïc Dombreval	REM	14,364	35.34	19,468	59.08
Jérôme Cochet	FN	9,166	22.55	13,483	40.92
Anne Sattonnet	UDI	8,546	21.03		
Sonia Naffati	FI	3,942	9.70		
Jean-Louis Fiori	PCF	1,545	3.80		
Brigitte Reynard	ECO	1,511	3.72		
Eliette Trouche	DLF	771	1.90		
Axel Thomas	DIV	338	0.83		
Alain Bouilleaux	EXG	270	0.66		
Pierre Valet	DVD	183	0.45		
Stéphane Cassarini	DVD	8	0.02		
Votes		40,644	100.00	32,951	100.00
Valid votes		40,644	98.03	32,951	90.61
Blank votes		641	1.55	2,720	7.48
Null votes		176	0.42	696	1.91
Turnout		41,461	48.49	36,367	42.54
Abstentions		44,043	51.51	49,131	57.46
Registered voters		85,504		85,498	
Source: Ministry of the Interior

=== 2012 ===
Summary of the 10 June and 17 June 2012 French legislative in Alpes-Maritimes's 2nd Constituency election results
Candidate	Party		1st round		2nd round	
Candidate	Party		Votes	%	Votes	%
Charles Ange Ginesy	Union for a Popular Movement	UMP	17,197	35.78%	23,822	53.29%
André Aschieri	Europe Ecology – The Greens	EELV	13,802	28.72%	20,880	46.71%
Jean-Marc Degioanni	National Front	FN	10,123	21.06%		
Fabrice Lachenmaier	Regionalist	REG	3,385	7.04%		
Frédérique Cattaert	Left Front	FG	1,974	4.11%		
Patrice Miran	Other ecologists	ECO	654	1.36%		
Brigitte Reynard	Other ecologists	ECO	601	1.25%		
Michelle Paulus	Far Left	EXG	182	0.38%		
Alain Bouilleaux	Far Left	EXG	146	0.30%		
Total			48,064	100%	44,702	100%
Registered voters			82,406		82,396	
Blank/Void ballots			556	0.69%	1,407	1.71%
Turnout			48,630	59.01%	46,109	55.96%
Abstentions			33,776	40.99%	36,287	44.04%
Result					UMP hold	

=== 2007 ===
Legislative Election 2007: Alpes Maritimes 2nd
Party	Candidate	Votes	%	±%
UMP	Muriel Marland-Militello	19 113	54.28	
PS	Dominique Boy-Mottard	7,482	21.25	
FN	Patrica Pellero	2,320	6.59	
MoDem	Céline Lacroix	1,955	5.55	
Far right	Benoît Loeuillet	938	2.66	
PCF	Danièle Gimeno	707	2.01	
LV	Rachel Khan	682	1.94	
MPF	Joëlle Martineau	676	1.92	
LCR	Fanny Tièche	445	1.26	
DVE	Jacques Leboucher	354	1.01	
DVG	Jean-Pierre Pisoni	197	0.56	
Independent	Stéphane Alauzet	165	0.47	
LO	Joseph Markiel	95	0.27	
DLR	Joël Rigolat	85	0.24	
Turnout		35,596	57.4	
UMP hold		Swing		

=== 2002 ===
Legislative Election 2002: Alpes-Maritimes's 2nd constituency
Party	Candidate	Votes	%	±%
UMP	Muriel Marland-Militello	12,518	33.68	
PS	Patrick Mattard	9,890	26.61	
FN	Marie-France Stirbois	8,556	23.02	
DVD	Jacqueline Mathieu-Obadia	2,498	6.72	
PCF	Simone Monticelli	768	2.07	
Others	N/A	2,934		
Turnout		37,648	55.89	
2nd round result
UMP	Muriel Marland-Militello	16,431	46.09	
PS	Patrick Mattard	12,046	33.79	
FN	Marie-France Stirbois	7,176	20.13	
Turnout		36,126	53.63	
UMP hold				

=== 1997 ===
Legislative Election 1997: Alpes-Maritimes's 2nd constituency
Party	Candidate	Votes	%	±%
RPR	Jacques Peyrat	13,022	35.12	
FN	Christian Desvignes	8,440	22.76	
PS	Patrick Mottard	7,876	21.24	
PCF	Simone Monticelli	2,165	5.84	
MPF	Joseph Grammatico	1,501	4.05	
LV	Jacqueline Thiemonge	1,111	3.00	
DIV	Bruno Pebeyre	876	2.36	
Others	N/A	2,086		
Turnout		38,408	56.38	
2nd round result
RPR	Jacques Peyrat	22,352	70.63	
FN	Christian Desvignes	9,293	29.37	
Turnout		37,691	55.33	
RPR hold				

== Sources ==
- Official results of French elections from 1998: "Résultats électoraux officiels en France" (in French). Archived from the original on 20 December 2011.
