= Lionel Tivoli =

French politician

Member of the National Assembly for Alpes-Maritimes's 2nd constituency
- In office 22 June 2022 – 9 June 2024
- Preceded by: Loïc Dombreval

Member of the Regional Council of Provence-Alpes-Côte d'Azur
- Incumbent
- Assumed office 4 January 2016

Personal details
- Born: 29 February 1988 (age 38) Marseille, France
- Party: National Rally (2006–present)
- Occupation: Businessman

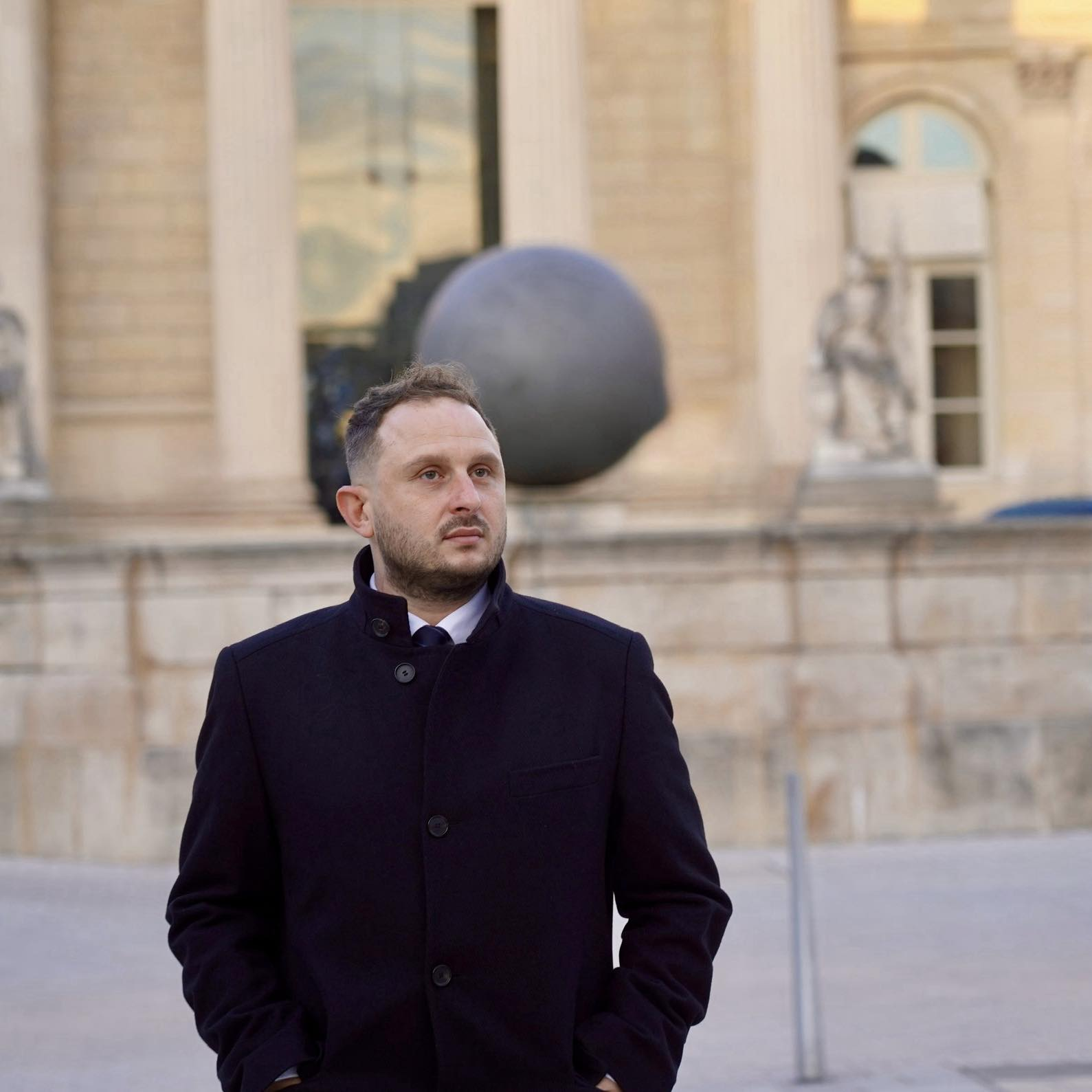
Tivoli in 2026

Lionel Tivoli (born 29 February 1988) is a French businessman and politician who has represented the 2nd constituency of the Alpes-Maritimes department in the National Assembly since 2022. He is a member of the National Rally (RN).

== Biography ==
Tivoli was born in Marseille. He worked as a recruitment consultant and hiring manager in the IT sector before founding a business that manufactures and sells e-liquids for electronic cigarettes in 2013. He joined the National Rally, previously known as the National Front, in 2006 and was a delegate for the National Youth Front (now Génération Nation) in Alpes-Maritimes.

Tivoli served as a municipal councillor of Antibes from 2014 to 2020, after which he became a municipal councillor of Vallauris.

In 2015, he was elected to the Regional Council of Provence-Alpes-Côte d'Azur for Alpes-Maritimes. The same year, he became the party's departmental secretary.

Ahead of the 2022 legislative election, Tivoli was selected to contest the 2nd constituency of Alpes-Maritimes. He subsequently took the seat from Loïc Dombreval of La République En Marche! after winning it in the second round.
