= Michèle Tabarot =

French politician

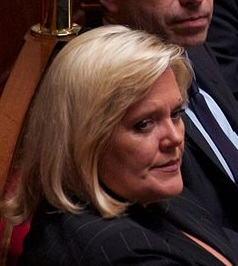
- Michèle Tabarot in 2017

Member of the National Assembly for Alpes-Maritimes's 9th constituency
- In office 19 June 2002 – 9 June 2024
- Preceded by: André Aschieri

Mayor of Le Cannet
- In office 19 June 1995 – 24 July 2017

General Secretary of the UMP
- In office 19 November 2012 – 15 June 2014
- Preceded by: Jean-François Copé
- Succeeded by: Luc Chatel

Chairperson of the Cultural and Education Affairs Committee
- In office 1 July 2009 – 28 June 2012
- Succeeded by: Patrick Bloche

Member of the Departmental council of Alpes-Maritimes for Canton of Le Cannet
- In office 27 March 1994 – 22 August 2002

Personal details
- Born: 13 October 1962 (age 64) Alicante, Spain
- Party: LR
- Relatives: Philippe Tabarot (brother)
- Occupation: Business executive

Michèle Tabarot (French: [miʃɛl tabaʁo]; born 13 October 1962) is a French politician of the Republicans who served as a member of the National Assembly of France from 2002 to 2024, representing Alpes-Maritimes' 9th constituency.

== Early life ==
Tabarot is the daughter of Robert Tabarot, Knight of the National Order of Merit, who was one of the leaders of the OAS in Oran, and former North African boxing champion (nicknamed "The Rock"). Her brother Philippe Tabarot is a member of the Senate. Arrival of Algeria, the family Tabarot exiles in Alicante (Spain) to the independence of Algeria, and remains there until 1969, after the amnesty of the old ones of the OAS.

== Political career ==
=== Career in local politics ===
Tabarot was Vice-mayor of Pierre Bachelet, mayor RPR of Cannet from 1983 to 1995. She defeated him in the municipal elections of 1995.

Since then, Tabarot has been re-elected mayor each time since the first round, in 2001 under the liberal-democratic label, in 2008 under the UMP label (64.96% of votes), then in 2014 under the UMP label (50.45% of the votes).

Due to the limitation of the plurality of the mandates, Tabarot resigned from her position of Mayor of Cannet on 24 July 2017.

=== Member of the National Assembly ===
Tabarot's first time as a candidate for the National Assembly was a Union for French Democracy-Liberal Democracy candidate in the 1997 legislative elections in the 9th constituency of Alpes-Maritimes, but she was beaten in the first round.

Tabarot was elected member of Parliament on 16 June 2002, for the 12th Legislature (2002–2007), in the 9th constituency of Alpes-Maritimes. She was re-elected in the first round, on 10 June 2007 with 53.13% of the votes, defeating André Aschieri, ecologist and mayor of Mouans-Sartoux. From 1 July 2009 to 28 June 2012, she was a Chairperson of the Cultural and Education Affairs Committee. She was re-elected, on 17 June 2012 and she became vice-chair of the Cultural and Education Affairs Committee.

In the UMP's 2012 leadership election, Tabarot endorsed Jean-François Copé.

In the Republicans' 2016 presidential primaries, Tabarot endorsed Copé as the party's candidate for the office of President of France. She later served as Copé's campaign director. On 3 March 2017, in the context of the Fillon affair, she gave up supporting candidate François Fillon LR in the presidential election and asked for his replacement by Alain Juppé.

Tabarot was re-elected in the 2017 French legislative election. She sits on the Foreign Affairs Committee and the Committee on European Affairs. In addition to her committee assignments, she serves as Vice-President of the France-India Friendship Group in National Assembly. Since 2022, she has also been part of the French delegation to the NATO Parliamentary Assembly, where she serves on the Political Committee, the Sub-Committee on NATO Partnerships, the Sub-Committee on Transatlantic Relations and the Mediterranean and Middle East Special Group.

In the Republicans’ 2017 leadership election, Tabarot endorsed Laurent Wauquiez as chairman.

Following Christian Jacob’ s election as LR chairman, Tabarot announced her candidacy to succeed him as leader of the party's parliamentary group. In an internal vote in November 2019, she eventually came in third out of six candidates; the position went to Damien Abad instead.

In the run-up to the Republicans’ 2022 convention, Tabarot endorsed Éric Ciotti as the party's chairman.

== Political positions ==
In July 2019, Tabarot voted in favor of the French ratification of the European Union's Comprehensive Economic and Trade Agreement (CETA) with Canada.

In 2020, Tabarot co-authored (along with Jacques Maire) a parliamentary report recommending tighter parliamentary oversight of government decisions on arms exports.
