= Honoré Bailet =

French politician

Mayor of Nice
- In office 26 September 1990 – 29 October 1993
- Preceded by: Jacques Médecin
- Succeeded by: Jean-Paul Baréty

Senator of the Alpes-Maritimes
- In office 24 September 1989 – 30 September 1998

Personal details
- Born: 27 February 1920; Nice, France
- Died: 16 September 2003 (aged 83); Marseille, France
- Political party: Rally for the Republic
- Occupation: Politician; Entrepreneur

Honoré Bailet (27 February 1920 – 16 September 2003) was a French politician and businessman. He was a member of the Rally for the Republic party. He served as Mayor of Nice from 26 September 1990 to 29 October 1993. He was senator of the Alpes-Maritimes from 24 September 1989 to 30 September 1998. He was appointed first deputy mayor of Nice in 1989.

== Biography ==
Honoré Bailet was born in Nice, France on 27 February 1920 and died in Marseille, France at the age of 83. The municipal council of Nice elected Honoré Bailet mayor of Nice to succeed Jacques Médecin.

Political offices
Preceded by Jacques Médecin	Mayor of Nice; 26 September 1990 – 29 October 1993	Succeeded by Jean-Paul Baréty
