= Militello =

Militello may refer to:

== Places ==
The following municipalities in Sicily, Italy:

- Militello in Val di Catania, Catania
- Militello Rosmarino, Messina
- Sant'Agata di Militello, Messina

== People ==
- Militello (surname), people with the surname
