= Christelle d'Intorni =

French politician (born 1985)

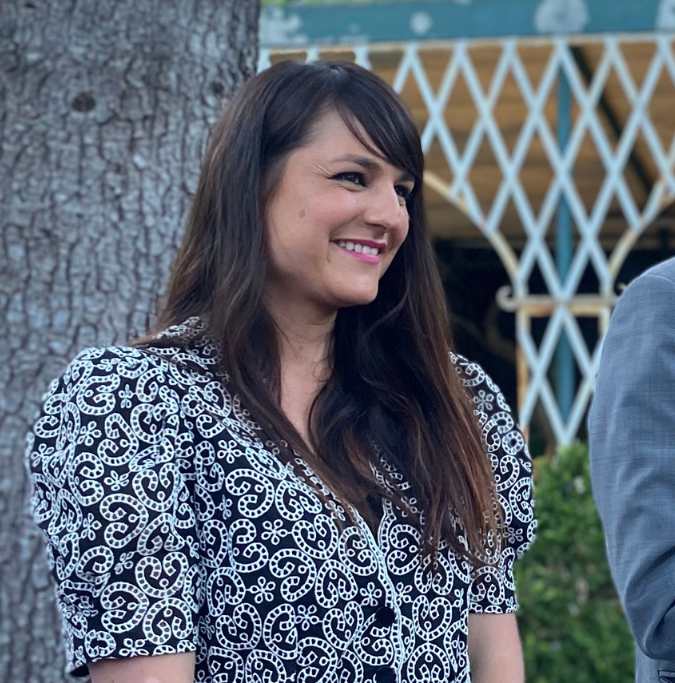

Member of the National Assembly for Alpes-Maritimes's 5th constituency
- Incumbent
- Assumed office 22 June 2022
- Preceded by: Marine Brenier

Mayor of Rimplas
- In office 4 April 2014 – 2 July 2022
- Preceded by: André Molinari
- Succeeded by: Pascal Guglielmetti

Member of the Departmental Council of Alpes-Maritimes for the canton of Tourrette-Levens
- Incumbent
- Assumed office 1 July 2021 Serving with Éric Ciotti
- Preceded by: Caroline Migliore

Personal details
- Born: 2 May 1985 (age 41) Nice, France
- Party: Union of the Right for the Republic (2024–present)
- Other political affiliations: The Republicans (2015–2024)
- Occupation: Lawyer • Politician

Christelle d'Intorni (French pronunciation: [kʁistɛl dɛ̃tɔʁni]; born 2 May 1985) is a French politician who has represented the 5th constituency of the Alpes-Maritimes department in the National Assembly since 2022. A member of the Union of the Right for the Republic (UDR), she was elected to the mayorship of Rimplas in 2014, becoming the youngest official in the department at that time, before she was reelected in 2020.

In the run-up to the 2022 The Republicans leadership election, she endorsed Éric Ciotti for the party chairmanship.

A candidate in the 2024 legislative elections for Alpes-Maritimes's 5th constituency on the list of Éric Ciotti, the Republicans on the Right, and supported by the National Rally, she was elected in the first round with 29,804 votes (50.35%). She joined the Union of the Right for the Republic (UDR) and was appointed vice-president in October 2024.

== See also ==
- List of deputies of the 16th National Assembly of France
