= Muriel Marland-Militello =

French politician (1943–2021)

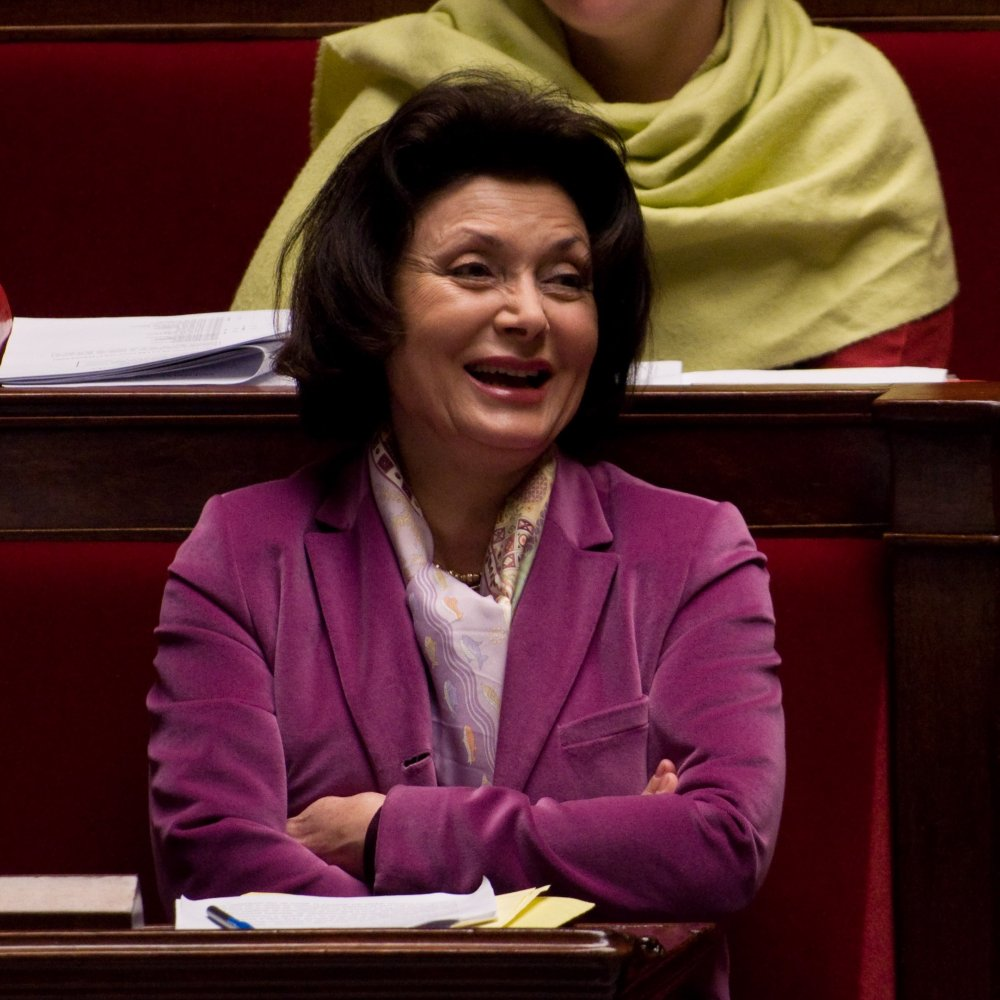
- Muriel Marland-Militello in 2009
- Parliamentary group: UMP

Deputy for Alpes-Maritimes's 2nd constituency in the National Assembly of France
- In office 16 June 2002 – 19 June 2012
- Preceded by: Jacqueline Mathieu-Obadia
- Succeeded by: Charles Ange Ginésy

Personal details
- Born: 30 July 1943 Nice, France
- Died: 25 February 2021 (aged 77) Nice, France

Muriel Marland-Militello (30 July 1943 – 25 February 2021) was a French politician, member of the National Assembly of France. She represented Alpes-Maritimes's 2nd constituency from 2002 to 2012 as a member of the Union for a Popular Movement. She was also a member of the Parliamentary Assembly of the Council of Europe (PACE). In this capacity she asked Turkish Prime Minister Recep Tayyip Erdoğan a question about the protection of minorities in Turkey during his appearance before the PACE in April 2011 and drew a dismissing response from him. Later, she disclosed towards media that she could have Armenian origin.

In a 2011 web interview, Marland-Militello declared that Philippe Séguin was her political mentor as well as Joan of Arc was her political key.

On 18 February 2009, she signed a project of law in order to promote and protect the creation and diffusion of a public supply of Internet contents, in a particular way for educational purposes.

On 22 July 2010, Laurent Joffrin published in Libération a public political intervention of Marland-Militello, concerning the freedom and the professional deontology of the French press, as well as the democratic need and the right to the media pluralism and independence. It recalled also the Declaration of the Rights and Duties of Journalists, which was signed 23–24 November 1971 in Munich by six Journalists' Unions of just as many EU countries.
