= Jacques Médecin =

French politician

Mayor of Nice
- In office 11 February 1966 – 16 September 1990
- Preceded by: Jean Médecin
- Succeeded by: Honoré Bailet

Member of the National Assembly for Alpes-Maritimes's 2nd constituency
- In office 3 April 1967 – 2 April 1986
- Preceded by: Diomède Catroux
- Succeeded by: Martine Daugreilh

Personal details
- Born: 5 May 1928 Nice, France
- Died: 17 November 1998 (aged 70) Punta del Este, Uruguay
- Party: RPR
- Parent: Jean Médecin (father)
- Education: Lycée Masséna

Jacques Médecin (5 May 1928 – 17 November 1998) was a French politician. A member of the Gaullist party RPR, he succeeded his father Jean Médecin as mayor of the city of Nice, serving from 1966 to 1990. Under suspicion of corruption, he fled France in 1990. He was extradited from Uruguay back to France in 1993, convicted and jailed; he died in 1998.

== Biography ==
Médecin was born in Nice, the son of Jean Médecin, an earlier long-serving mayor of the town. He studied law in Paris and worked for several years as a journalist. He was elected mayor of Nice in 1966 after his father died in office, and member of Parliament the year after (positions he held simultaneously). He was also elected as General councillor, then president of the General Council of Alpes-Maritimes, the department surrounding Nice. Additionally, he served as Secretary of State for Tourism in Jacques Chirac's government from 1976 to 1977.

Médecin was challenged in the first round of the 1977 municipal elections, and accused of links with former members of the OAS terrorist group which, it was claimed, had helped OAS member and notorious bank robber Albert Spaggiari to escape. Later, when Médecin was criticized for positions that were widely seen as racist, he responded that he shared almost "99% of the views" of the far right National Front party, and called the party's leader Jean-Marie Le Pen an "old friend". He was a supporter of the apartheid regime in South Africa, and in 1974 proposed a town-twinning link between Nice and Cape Town.

In the 1980s Médecin became the target of corruption allegations, following an exposé of judicial and police wrongdoing in Nice by British novelist Graham Greene. Accusations of political corruption against him grew through the decade, and Médecin fled France in 1990. He was finally arrested in Uruguay in 1993 and was extradited to France in 1994. He was convicted of several counts of corruption and associated crimes, and sentenced to prison.

Médecin returned to Uruguay following his release from prison. He died in Punta del Este, Uruguay, in November 1998, of cardiac arrest.

Outside politics, Médecin was the author of a noted book on the cuisine of the Nice region, published in English translation by Penguin Books in 1983, and reissued by Grub Street in 2002. In the context of an article about different philosophies on the preparation of salade niçoise, chef and food writer for the Financial Times Rowley Leigh wrote of the book: "Things changed in 1983 with the publication of the English translation of Cuisine Niçoise: Recipes from a Mediterranean Kitchen by one Jacques Médecin."

== Political career ==
Governmental functions

Secretary of State for Tourism : 1976–1977

Electoral mandates

National Assembly of France

Member of the National Assembly of France for Alpes-Maritimes : 1967–1988. Elected in 1967, reelected in 1968, 1973, 1978, 1981, 1986.

General Council

President of the General Council of Alpes-Maritimes : 1973–1990 (Resignation). Reelected in 1976, 1979, 1982, 1985, 1988.

General councillor of Alpes-Maritimes : 1961–1990 (Resignation). Reelected in 1979, 1985.

Municipal Council

Mayor of Nice : 1966–1990 (Resignation). Reelected in 1971, 1977, 1983, 1989

Municipal councillor of Nice : 1965–1990 (Resignation). Reelected in 1971, 1977, 1983, 1989.
