= Alexandre Baréty =

- Born: 22 May 1844; Puget-Théniers, Alpes-Maritimes, France
- Died: 28 February 1918 (aged 73); Nice, Alpes-Maritimes, France
- Occupation: Physician
- Children: Léon Baréty
- Relatives: Jean-Paul Baréty (grandson)

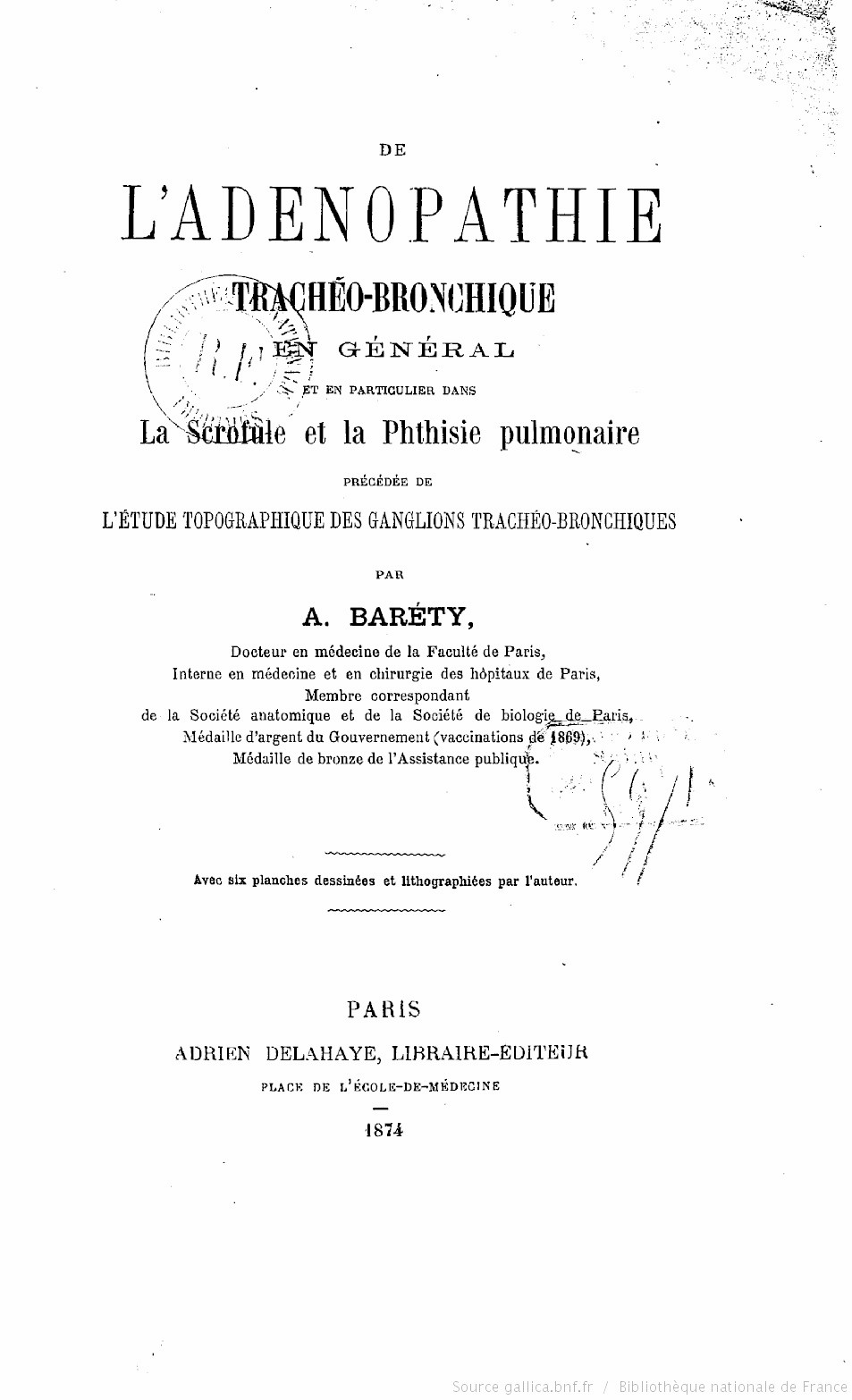
De l'adénopathie trachéo-bronchique en général et en particulier dans le scrofule et la phthisie pulmonaire précédée de l’étude topographique des ganglions trachéo-bronchiques by Alexandre Baréty, 1874.

Alexandre Baréty (1844-1918) was a French physician. He was the author of many medical papers. With Henri Sappia, he co-founded the Acadèmia Nissarda, a historical society in Nice, in 1904.

== Biography ==
Born into a family from Guillaumes, he pursued a brilliant secondary education in Nice before starting medical studies in Paris. The first Niçois to be accepted as a Paris hospital intern in 1869, he defended his thesis in 1874, winning a silver medal from the Paris Faculty of Medicine and the Prix Châteauvillard. The Franco-Prussian War his internship, and he became an aide-major at the Couvent des Récollets de Paris during the Siege of Paris (1870–1871).

He then returned to Nice to become a renowned practitioner. He was a Nice city councilor from 1878 to 1881, general councilor of Alpes-Maritimes from 1880 to 1904 (including several years as vice-president of this departmental assembly), then for a time mayor of Puget-Théniers.

He takes over from Henri Sappia as editor of the magazine Nice historique. He was the founder and first president of the Acadèmia Nissarda in 1904. An art lover, he published a number of historical and archaeological articles; he was also interested in Animal magnetism. He commissioned architect Lucien Barbet to build the Palais Baréty between 1897 and 1898.

The right pretracheal space, (an anatomical space located in the middle Mediastinum of the human Thorax), bears its name: Loge de Baréty.

He was the father of Third Republic MP Léon Baréty and the grandfather of French Fifth Republic MP and Mayor of Nice Jean-Paul Baréty.

Alexandre Baréty was buried in the Cimiez cemetery.

== Works ==
- Baréty, Alexandre (1874). De l'Adénopathie trachéo-bronchique en général et en particulier dans la scrofule et la phtisie pulmonaire, précédée de l'étude topographique des ganglions trachéo-bronchiques. Paris: A. Delahaye.
- Baréty, Alexandre (1874). De quelques modifications pathologique dépendant d'hémorragies ou de ramollissements circonscrits du cerveau. Paris: A. Delahaye.
- Baréty, Alexandre (1874). De la kératite eczémateuse. Paris: A. Parent.
- Baréty, Alexandre (1876). Du rhumatisme articulaire aigu, de la fièvre intermittente, du délire dit analcoolique et de certaines affections de la peau en rapport avec les traumatismes. Nice.
- Baréty, Alexandre (1877). De l'infantilisme.
- Baréty, Alexandre (1878). Quelques mots sur la topographie des organes thoraciques. Nice: Imprimerie Cauvin-Empereur.
- Baréty, Alexandre (1881). De la laryngite striduleuse (faux croup). Nice.
- Baréty, Alexandre (1881). De la laryngite striduleuse (faux-croup) considéré comme un des symptômes de l'engorgement aigu des ganglions lymphatiques trachéo-bronchiques. Nice: Imprimerie Cauvin-Empereur.
- Baréty, Alexandre (1882). Des Propriétés physiques d'une force particulière du corps humain (force neurique rayonnante), connue vulgairement sous le nom de magnétisme animal. Paris: O. Doin.
- Baréty, Alexandre (1882). Du Climat de Nice et de ses indications et contre-indications en général. Paris: O. Doin.
- Baréty, Alexandre (1882). De l'action du climat de Nice dans le traitement de la phtisie pulmonaire. Nice.
- Baréty, Alexandre (1887). Le magnétisme animal, étudié sous le nom de force neurique, rayonnante et circulante : dans ses propriétés physiques, physiologiques et thérapeutiques. Paris: O. Doin.
- Baréty, Alexandre (1902). Titres et travaux scientifiques. Paris: Imprimerie Malvano.
- Baréty, Alexandre (1908). Les Fouilles du monastère de St Pons à Nice : Découverte de sarcophages du IVe siècle. Nice: Imprimerie P. Lersch et A.-N. Emanuel.
- Baréty, Alexandre (1909). Vieux souvenirs. Réminiscences païennes. Nice: Imprimerie de P. Lersch et P.-A. Emanuel.
