= Philippe Tabarot =

French politician (born 1970)

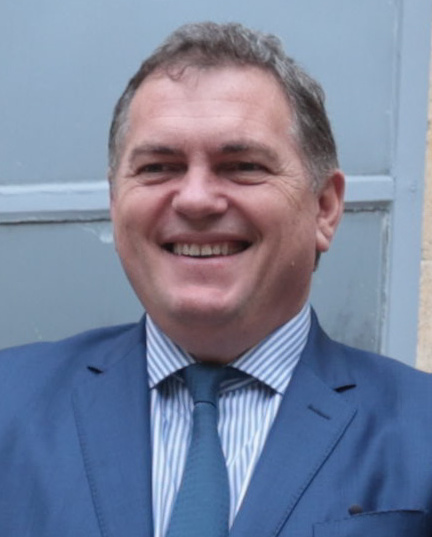
- Tabarot in 2025

Minister for Transport
- Incumbent
- Assumed office 23 December 2024
- Prime Minister: François Bayrou; Sébastien Lecornu
- Preceded by: François Durovray

Senator for Alpes-Maritimes
- In office 1 October 2020 – 23 January 2025

Personal details
- Born: 25 November 1970 (age 55) Cannes, France
- Party: LR (since 2015)
- Other political affiliations: PR (until 1997); DL (1997–2002); UMP (2002–2015)
- Relatives: Michèle Tabarot (sister)
- Education: University of Nice

Philippe Tabarot (French pronunciation: [filip tabaʁo]; born 25 November 1970) is a French politician who has served as Minister for Transport in the successive governments of Prime Ministers François Bayrou and Sébastien Lecornu since 2024. A member of The Republicans (LR), he represented Alpes-Maritimes in the Senate from 2020 to 2025.

== Political career ==
Tabarot previously served as vice president of the Departmental Council of Alpes-Maritimes, as vice president of the Regional Council of Provence-Alpes-Côte d'Azur, and as a member of the municipal council of Cannes. He was a candidate for mayor of Cannes in the 2014 municipal election, finishing second to David Lisnard.

In 2023, Tabarot was appointed secretary for transport in the shadow cabinet of The Republicans leader Éric Ciotti.

In early 2025, France's national financial prosecutor PNF opened a preliminary probe into Tabarot over suspicions of misappropriation of public funds between 2018 and 2020.

== Personal life ==
Tabarot is the brother of fellow politician Michèle Tabarot.
