= Alpes-Maritimes's 9th constituency =

Constituency of the National Assembly of France

9th constituency of Alpes Maritimes
- inline Constituency of the National Assembly of France

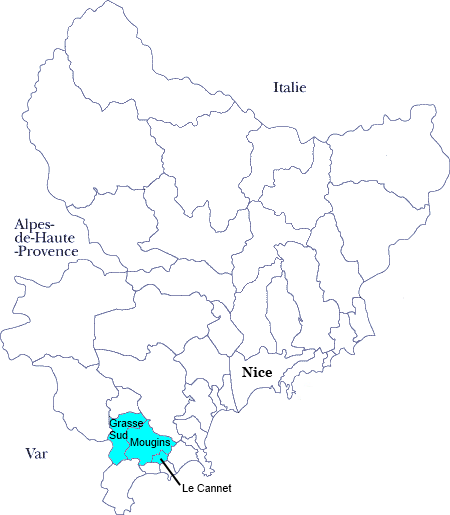
- Constituency (post 2012) in department

- Alpes Maritimes in France
- Deputy: Michèle Tabarot; LR
- Department: Alpes Maritimes
- Cantons: Cannet, Grasse-Nord, Grasse-Sud, Mougins, Saint-Auban, Saint-Vallier-de-Thiey

The 9th constituency of Alpes-Maritimes is a French legislative constituency currently represented by Michèle Tabarot of The Republicans (LR). It is located in the western part of the department, around the town of Grasse.

== Historic Representation ==
Election	Member	Party
1988	Pierre Bachelet	RPR
1993	Pierre Bachelet	RPR
1997	André Aschieri	EELV
2002	Michèle Tabarot	UMP
2007	Michèle Tabarot	UMP
2012	Michèle Tabarot	UMP
2017	Michèle Tabarot	LR
2022	Michèle Tabarot	LR
2024	Michèle Tabarot	LR

== Election results ==
=== 2024 ===
Candidate	Party	Alliance	First round		Second round	
Candidate	Party	Alliance	Votes	%	Votes	%
Michèle Tabarot	LR	UDC	18,334	33.85	28,407	52.99
Franck Galbert	RN		22,921	42.31	25,206	47.01
José Garcia Abia	PS	NFP	9,987	18.43		
Henriette Palmers	DIV		1,742	3.22		
Sylvain Lienhardt	REC		900	1.66		
Liliane Pécout	LO		294	0.55		
Valid votes			54,178	98.33	53,613	97.03
Blank votes			684	1.24	1,301	2.35
Null votes			237	0.43	338	0.61
Turnout			55,099	66.88	55,252	67.05
Abstentions			27,287	33.12	27,152	32.95
Registered voters			82,386		82,404	
Result			LR HOLD			

=== 2022 ===
Legislative Election 2022: Alpes-Maritimes's 9th constituency
Party	Candidate	Votes	%	±%
LR (UDC)	Michèle Tabarot	10,605	28.94	-0.31
RN	Franck Galbert	7,518	20.51	+2.24
LREM (Ensemble)	Mayaa Tudiesche	5,538	15.11	−19.39
PS (NUPÉS)	Chantal Chasseriaud	5,395	14.72	+1.61
REC	Xuan Truong Nguyen	2,712	7.40	N/A
LREM	Jean-Paul Camerano*	1,812	4.94	N/A
DVE	Evelyne Barroero	1,351	3.69	+1.81
Others	N/A	1,718	4.68	
Turnout		36,649	45.68	−1.67
2nd round result
LR (UDC)	Michèle Tabarot	19,998	63.20	+9.22
RN	Franck Galbert	11,646	36.80	N/A
Turnout		31,644	41.65	−1.85
LR hold				

* LREM dissident.

=== 2017 ===
Candidate	Label	First round		Second round	
Candidate	Label	Votes	%	Votes	%
Dominique Fillebeen	REM	12,869	34.50	14,947	46.02
Michèle Tabarot	LR	10,912	29.25	17,530	53.98
Nathalie Pavard	FN	6,815	18.27		
Denis Leblanc	FI	2,580	6.92		
Didier Chérel	ECO	1,060	2.84		
Louis Acacio	PS	761	2.04		
Pascal Ducreux	ECO	703	1.88		
Jean-Luc Burgaud	DLF	623	1.67		
Odile Clemente	PCF	489	1.31		
David Pauchet	DIV	227	0.61		
Ludovic Brossy	DIV	144	0.39		
Véronique Fressignaud	EXG	117	0.31		
Votes		37,300	100.00	32,477	100.00
Valid votes		37,300	98.54	32,477	93.62
Blank votes		451	1.19	1,767	5.09
Null votes		100	0.26	447	1.29
Turnout		37,851	47.35	34,691	43.40
Abstentions		42,083	52.65	45,245	56.60
Registered voters		79,934		79,936	
Source: Ministry of the Interior

=== 2012 ===
Summary of the 10 June and 17 June 2012 French legislative in Alpes-Maritimes' 9th Constituency election results
Candidate	Party		1st round		2nd round	
Candidate	Party		Votes	%	Votes	%
Michèle Tabarot	Union for a Popular Movement	UMP	20,628	47.32%	24,344	61.32%
Marie-Louise Gourdon	Socialist Party	PS	12,462	28.59%	15,359	38.68%
Marlène Orfila	National Front	FN	7,600	17.43%		
Pierre Bernasconi	Left Front	FG	1,738	3.99%		
Pascal Ducreux	Ecologist	ECO	614	1.41%		
Haydée Muller	Ecologist	ECO	341	0.78%		
Robert Giardina	Far Left	EXG	120	0.28%		
Laurent de Vargas	Other	AUT	93	0.21%		
Total			43,596	100%	39,703	100%
Registered voters			77,292		77,291	
Blank/Void ballots			437	0.99%	970	2.38%
Turnout			44,033	56.97%	40,673	52.62%
Abstentions			33,259	43.03%	36,618	47.38%
Result					UMP HOLD	

=== 2007 ===
Legislative Election 2007: Alpes Maritimes 9th
Party	Candidate	Votes	%	±%
UMP	Michèle Tabarot	35,021	53.13	
LV	André Aschieri	24,719	37.5	
FN	Jean-Marc Degioanni	2,988	4.53	
MEI	Pascal Ducreux	781	1.18	
LCR	François Marchive	774	1.17	
MPF	Hugo Debonnet	458	0.69	
CPNT	Maurice Massa	316	0.48	
Independent	Béatrix Arrii	298	0.45	
MNR	Johanne de Jouvancourt	285	0.43	
LO	Nadia Putzolu	273	0.41	
Turnout		66,617	62.58	
UMP hold		Swing		

=== 2002 ===
Legislative Election 2002: Alpes-Maritimes's 9th constituency
Party	Candidate	Votes	%	±%
UMP	Michèle Tabarot	24,371	39.91	
LV	André Aschieri	22,043	36.10	
FN	Jean-Pierre Schénardi	10,137	16.60	
PCF	Paul Euzière	1,239	2.03	
Others	N/A	3,271		
Turnout		61,730	65.15	
2nd round result
UMP	Michèle Tabarot	29,385	50.52	
LV	André Aschieri	28,779	49.48	
Turnout		59,603	62.94	
UMP gain from LV				

=== 1997 ===
Legislative Election 1997: Alpes-Maritimes's 9th constituency
Party	Candidate	Votes	%	±%
LV	André Aschieri	15,696	27.92	
FN	Dominique Vidal	12,423	22.10	
UDF	Michèle Tabarot	10,822	19.25	
RPR	Pierre Bachelet*	5,915	10.52	
MPF	Jean-Pierre Leleux	5,010	8.91	
PCF	Paul Euzière	3,671	6.53	
Others	N/A	2,675		
Turnout		57,882	65.87	
2nd round result
LV	André Aschieri	30,445	56.28	
FN	Dominique Vidal	23,655	43.72	
Turnout		59,161	67.33	
LV gain from RPR				

*RPR dissident

== References and sources ==
Results at the Ministry of the Interior (French)
