= Henri Sappia =

French historian and journalist

Enrico Sappia
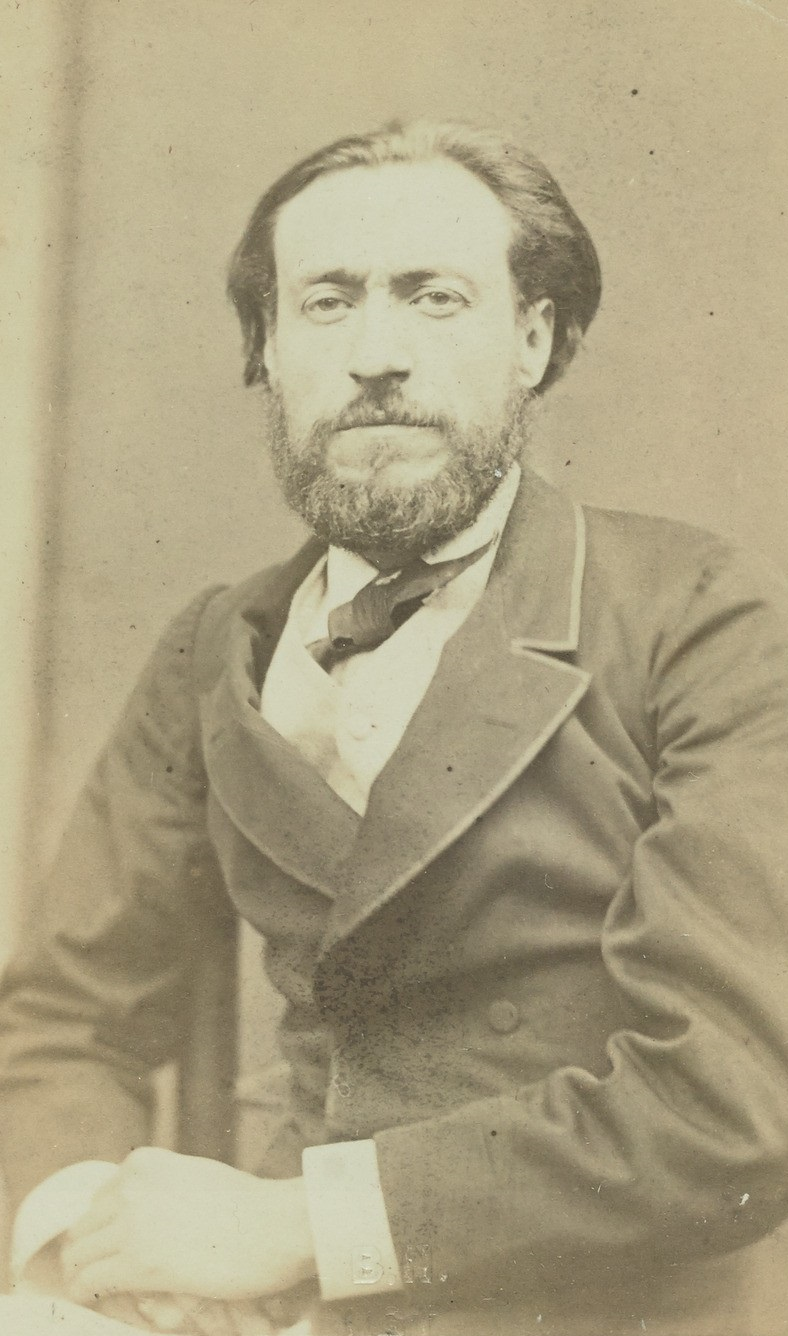
- Born: April 17, 1833; Touët-de-l'Escarène, Alpes-Maritimes, France
- Died: September 29, 1909 (aged 76); Nice, Alpes-Maritimes, France
- Occupations: Journalist, author
- Parent(s): Giuseppe Sappia; Marcellina Simon

Enrico Sappia (1833-1906) was an Italian journalist and author.

== Early life ==
Henri Sappia was born on April 17, 1833, in Touët-de-l'Escarène, County of Nice, Kingdom of Sardinia, (nowadays Alpes-Maritimes, France).

Sappia was sentenced to a 15-year prison sentence on August 12, 1870, due to his opposition to Emperor Napoleon III and his support for the republic. With the fall of the Second French Empire on September 4, 1870, he never went to jail.

== Career ==
Sappia was a journalist. He founded Nice-historique in 1898.

Sappia co-founded the Acadèmia Nissarda, a historical society in Nice, in 1904 with Alexandre Baréty. He stressed that Nice was culturally Provençal, not Italian.

== Death and legacy ==
Sappia died on September 29, 1909, in Nice, France. The Boulevard Henri Sappia in Nice was named after him.
