= Dominique Estrosi Sassone =

French politician

Member of the French Senate for Alpes-Maritimes
- Incumbent
- Assumed office 1 October 2014

Member of the Municipal council of Nice
- Incumbent
- Assumed office 21 March 2008
- Mayor: Philippe Pradal; Christian Estrosi

Personal details
- Born: Dominique Sassone; 14 November 1958 (age 67) Nice, France
- Party: The Republicans
- Spouse: Christian Estrosi (divorced)
- Children: 2
- Education: University of Nice Sophia Antipolis

Dominique Estrosi Sassone (born 14 November 1958) is a French politician of the Republicans (LR) who has been serving as a member of the French Senate since 2014, representing the department of Alpes-Maritimes.

== Early life and education ==
Estrosi Sassone is the daughter of Jean Sassone, who served as deputy mayor of Nice from 1977 to 1995, and received a master's degree in law from the University of Nice Sophia Antipolis.

== Career ==
Estrosi Sassone served in the territorial civil service before being elected deputy mayor of Nice in 2001. In 2004, she was elected to the regional council for Provence-Alpes-Côte d'Azur.

Estrosi Sassone was elected to the Senate on 28 September 2014. She also serves as a member of the council for the Metropolis Nice Côte d'Azur. In the Senate, she serves on the Committee on Economic Affairs. In addition to her committee assignments, she has been chairing the French-Monaco Parliamentary Friendship Group since 2020.

In the Republicans' 2016 primary, Estrosi Sassone endorsed Nicolas Sarkozy as the party's candidate for the 2017 French presidential election. In the Republicans' 2025 leadership election, she later endorsed Bruno Retailleau to succeed Éric Ciotti as the party's new chair.

== Personal life ==
Estrosi Sassone was married to fellow LR politician Christian Estrosi; the couple has two daughters but have since divorced.
