= Alpes-Maritimes's 5th constituency =

Constituency of the National Assembly of France

5th constituency of Alpes Maritimes
- inline Constituency of the National Assembly of France

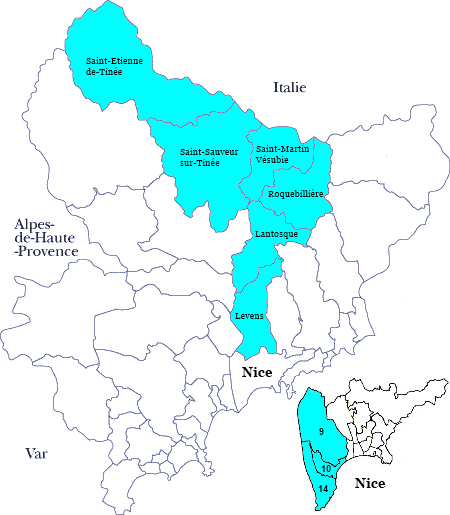
- Constituency (post 2012) in department

- Alpes Maritimes in France
- Deputy: Christelle d’Intorni; LR (UXD)
- Department: Alpes Maritimes
- Cantons: Contes, Guillaumes, Lantosque, Levens, Nice-9, Nice-14, Puget-Théniers, Roquebillière, Roquestéron, Saint-Étienne-de-Tinée, Saint-Martin-Vésubie, Saint-Sauveur-sur-Tinée, Villars-sur-Var

The 5th constituency of Alpes-Maritimes is a French legislative constituency that elects one deputy to the National Assembly.It was represented in the XVth legislature by Marine Brenier of the Republicans (LR). It takes in almost the entirety of the Nicois backcountry, and down to the sea to the west of the city of Nice, thus giving it the nickname 'Nice-Mountains'.

== Historic Representation ==
Election	Member	Party
1988	Christian Estrosi	RPR
1993	Gaston Franco	RPR
1997	Christian Estrosi	RPR
2002	Christian Estrosi	UMP
2007	Charles-Ange Ginésy	UMP
2010	Christian Estrosi	UMP
2012	Christian Estrosi	UMP
2016	Marine Brenier	LR
2017	Marine Brenier	LR
2022	Christelle d’Intorni	LR
2024	Christelle d’Intorni	LR

== Election results ==
=== 2024 ===
Candidate	Party	Alliance	First round		Second round	
Candidate	Party	Alliance	Votes	%	Votes	%
Christelle D’Intorni	LR-RN	UXD	29,804	50.35		
Fabrice Decoupigny	LE	NFP	12,233	20.66		
Gaël Nofri	HOR	Ensemble	8,473	14.31		
Patrice Benoit	DIV		6,375	10.77		
Agnès Benkemoun	LO		436	0.74		
Axel Hvidsten	EAC		1,876	317		
Valid votes			59,197	97.34		
Blank votes			1,114	1.83		
Null votes			503	0.83		
Turnout			60,814	66.66		
Abstentions			30,418	33.34		
Registered voters			91,232			
Result			LR HOLD			

=== 2022 ===
Legislative Election 2022: Alpes-Maritimes's 5th constituency
Party	Candidate	Votes	%	±%
HOR (Ensemble)	Marine Brenier-Ohanessian*	10,400	26.14	N/A
LR (UDC)	Christelle d’Intorni	8,943	22.48	-21.75
RN	Frank Khalifa	7,560	19.00	−4.37
EELV (NUPÉS)	Philippe Benassaya	7,052	17.73	+3.50
REC	Cédric Vella	2,843	7.15	N/A
DVE	Géraldine Maiyé	911	2.56	+0.45
Others	N/A	1,604	4.03	
Turnout		39,783	44.40	−0.47
2nd round result
LR (UDC)	Christelle d’Intorni	19,814	57.54	-2.67
HOR (Ensemble)	Marine Brenier-Ohanessian*	14,623	42.46	N/A
Turnout		34,437	40.92	+1.32
LR hold				

* Brenier previous stood for LR. The swing from her previous result is counted towards the result of the 2022 candidate for LR.

=== 2017 ===
Candidate	Label	First round		Second round	
Candidate	Label	Votes	%	Votes	%
Marine Brenier	LR	11,090	28.97	19,425	61.21
Chantal Agnely	FN	8,948	23.37	12,311	38.79
Daniel Brun	DIV	7,192	18.79		
Philippe Pellegrini	FI	3,978	10.39		
Benoît Kandel	DVD	1,773	4.63		
Jacqueline Devier	PS	1,472	3.84		
Thibault Delhez	DLF	868	2.27		
Maryse Ullmann	ECO	807	2.11		
Christine Beyl	ECO	611	1.60		
Feïza Ben Mohamed	DIV	397	1.04		
Richard Zanca	DIV	350	0.91		
Romain Icart	DVD	286	0.75		
Patricia Ney	DIV	259	0.68		
Jean-Marie Alexandre	EXG	182	0.48		
Jean-Philippe Lefèvre	DVD	72	0.19		
Votes		38,285	100.00	31,736	100.00
Valid votes		38,285	97.08	31,736	91.18
Blank votes		811	2.06	2,106	6.05
Null votes		342	0.87	965	2.77
Turnout		39,438	44.87	34,807	39.60
Abstentions		48,465	55.13	53,093	60.40
Registered voters		87,903		87,900	
Source: Ministry of the Interior

=== 2012 ===
Summary of the 10 June and 17 June 2012 French legislative in Alpes-Maritimes' 5th Constituency election results
Candidate	Party		1st round		2nd round	
Candidate	Party		Votes	%	Votes	%
Christian Estrosi	Union for a Popular Movement	UMP	21,814	44.23%	28,019	63.41%
Paul Cuturello	Socialist Party	PS	12,419	25.18%	16,168	36.59%
Danielle Cardin	National Front	FN	10,559	21.41%		
Emmanuelle Gaziello	Left Front	FG	1,944	3.94%		
Gildas Dupré		CEN	649	1.32%		
Brigitte Ballouard	Ecologist	ECO	615	1.25%		
Florence Ciaravola	Far Left	EXG	475	0.96%		
Axel Hvidsten	Ecologist	ECO	333	0.68%		
Anthony Mitrano	Miscellaneous Right	DVD	307	0.62%		
Jean-Pierre Pisoni	Far Left	EXG	132	0.27%		
Jean-Marie Alexandre	Far Left	EXG	74	0.15%		
Total			49,321	100%	44,187	100%
Registered voters			85,420		85,420	
Blank/Void ballots			604	1.21%	1,932	4.19%
Turnout			49,925	58.45%	46,119	53.99%
Abstentions			35,495	41.55%	39,301	46.01%
Result					UMP HOLD	

=== 2007 ===
Legislative Election 2007: Alpes-Maritimes 5th
Party	Candidate	Votes	%	±%
UMP	Christian Estrosi	32,580	60.08	
PS	Paul Culturello	8,560	15.78	
PCF	Francis Tujague	3,959	7.30	
FN	Bruno Ligonie	2,846	5.25	
MoDem	Karine Lambert	2,002	3.69	
Far right	Pierre-Antoine Plaquevent	1,195	2.20	
LV	Jeannine Thiemonge	754	1.39	
LCR	Pascale Gacem	710	1.31	
MEI	Axel Hvidsten	344	0.63	
DVE	Serge Gabry	335	0.62	
MNR	Rose-Marie Baele	242	0.45	
CPNT	Jean-Jacques Remond	241	0.44	
LO	Danièle Bartoli	240	0.44	
Independent	Michaël Abitbol	223	0.41	
Turnout		54,907	63.25	
UMP hold		Swing		

=== 2002 ===
Legislative Election 2002: Alpes-Maritimes's 5th constituency
Party	Candidate	Votes	%	±%
UMP	Christian Estrosi	22,980	45.53	
FN	Jean Thiery	10,321	20.45	
PS	Paul Cuturello	10,227	20.26	
PCF	Jacques Tiberi	3,952	7.83	
Others	N/A	2,992		
Turnout		51,457	61.70	
2nd round result
UMP	Christian Estrosi	28,629	73.31	
FN	Jean Thiery	10,424	26.69	
Turnout		44,437	53.32	
UMP hold				

=== 1997 ===
Legislative Election 1997: Alpes-Maritimes's 5th constituency
Party	Candidate	Votes	%	±%
RPR	Christian Estrosi	15,295	31.00	
FN	Robert Gazut	11,129	22.55	
PS	Paul Cuturello	9,388	19.02	
PCF	Francis Tujague	8,442	17.11	
GE	Xavier Robert	1,658	3.36	
MPF	Hélène Salicetti	1,057	2.14	
Others	N/A	2,377		
Turnout		51,724	64.52	
2nd round result
RPR	Christian Estrosi	27,240	66.71	
FN	Robert Gazut	13,591	33.29	
Turnout		50,192	62.62	
RPR hold				
