= Jacques Peyrat =

French politician

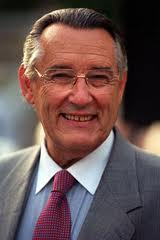

Mayor of Nice
- In office 1995–2008
- Preceded by: Jean-Paul Baréty
- Succeeded by: Christian Estrosi

Personal details
- Born: 18 October 1931 (age 94) Belfort, France
- Party: RPR; UMP
- Education: University of Paris

Jacques Peyrat (born 18 October 1931) is a French politician and lawyer who was mayor of Nice from 1995 to 2008 and has been senator from the Alpes-Maritimes from 1998 to 2008.

Jacques Peyrat came from a military family that settled in Nice in 1946 where he studied law and letters. In 1947 at the age of 16 he joined the Rally of the French People (Rassemblement du Peuple Français, RPF), the political party that General Charles de Gaulle created that year.

In 1953 Peyrat enlisted in the 1st Foreign Parachute Battalion of the French Foreign Legion. It was in French Indochina that he met and became friends with the French politician Jean-Marie Le Pen.

Upon his return to civilian life, Peyrat united his social and professional interests. His presidency of parachute and aeronautical groups won him a silver medal for youth and sports.

In 1962 Peyrat began his political career, at first as a member of the National Centre of Independents and Peasants (CNIP), and then in the breakaway Independent Republicans party of Valéry Giscard d'Estaing, as a Nice municipal councillor. At the same time, he practiced law with a specialty in penal law.

In 1973 Peyrat rejoined the Front National, Jean-Marie Le Pen's far-right party, and was a Front National deputy from 1986 to 1988, general counsel of the Canton of Nice 14 from 1992 to 1998 and regional councillor.

In 1995 Jacques Peyrat left the Front National and was elected Mayor of Nice with the slogan "Divers droite" (figuratively, An Alternative Right). He was reelected in 2001.

In 1996 he rejoined the RPR. Since September 27, 1998 he has been senator first with then RPR, then with the center-right Union for a Popular Movement (Union pour un Mouvement Populaire, UMP) from the Alpes-Maritimes. In 2002, Peyrat founded la Communauté d'agglomération de Nice-Côte d'Azur and became president of it.

He is also a member of the Superior Council of the Military Reserve (Conseil supérieur de la réserve militaire) and a member of the High Court of Justice (Haute Cour de Justice).

== Sources ==
- Entry to Jacques Peyrat in the French Wikipedia, translated from the French
- City of Nice official biographical sketch
