= Alpes-Maritimes's 1st constituency =

Constituency of the National Assembly of France

1st constituency of Alpes-Maritimes
- inline Constituency of the National Assembly of France

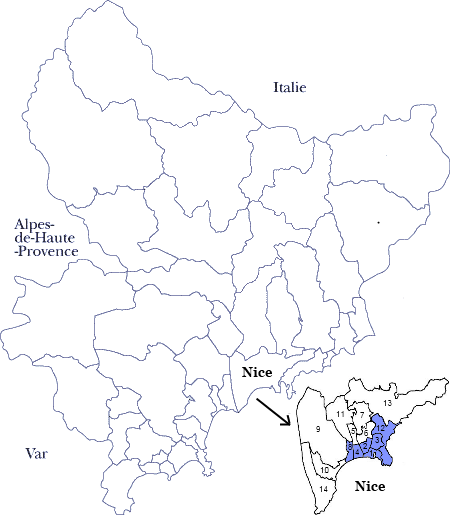
- Map of the 1st constituency (post-2010 redrawing) of Alpes-Maritimes

- Alpes-Maritimes in metropolitan France
- Deputy: Éric Ciotti; LR (UXD)
- Department: Alpes-Maritimes
- Cantons: Nice-1, Nice-2, Nice-3, Nice-12

The 1st constituency of Alpes-Maritimes is a French legislative constituency located on the country's Mediterranean coast, in its southeastern Alpes-Maritimes department. Since 2007, its representative to the National Assembly has been Éric Ciotti of The Republicans (LR).

The constituency covers the centre-east of the city of Nice, including most of its landmarks; it had 90,656 inhabitants at the last count. Its borders were re-drawn in 2010.

== Historical representation ==
Election	Member	Party
1988	Charles Ehrmann	UDF
1993	Charles Ehrmann	UDF
1997	Charles Ehrmann	UDF
2002	Jérôme Rivière	UMP
2007	Éric Ciotti	UMP
2012	Éric Ciotti	UMP
2017	Éric Ciotti	LR
2022	Éric Ciotti	LR
2024	Éric Ciotti	UDR

== Election results ==
=== 2024 ===
Candidate	Party	Alliance	First round		Second round	
Candidate	Party	Alliance	Votes	%	Votes	%
Eric Ciotti	LR-RN	UXD	20,809	41.04	22,585	45.14
Olivier Salerno	LFI	NFP	13,499	26.62	16,077	32.13
Graig Monetti	HOR	Ensemble	11,558	22.79	11,374	22.73
Virgile Vanier-Guérin	LR	UDC	2,933	5.78		
Lalla Chama Ben Moulay	EAC		1,427	2.81		
Alain Langouet	LO		313	0.62		
Jean-Claude Wahid Spach	DIV		136	0.27		
Maxime Bovis	DVD		34	0.07		
Valid votes			50,709	98.01	50,036	98.72
Blank votes			667	1.29	839	1.64
Null votes			362	0.70	328	0.64
Turnout			51,738	63.19	51,202	62.53
Abstentions			30,141	36.81	30,681	37.47
Registered voters			81,879		81,883	
Result			LR HOLD			

=== 2022 ===
Legislative Election 2022: Alpes-Maritimes's 1st constituency
Party	Candidate	Votes	%	±%
LR (UDC)	Eric Ciotti	11,271	31.70	-3.30
LREM (Ensemble)	Graig Monetti	9,215	25.92	-6.43
LFI (NUPÉS)	Anne-Laure Chaintron	7,260	20.42	+4.35
RN	Muriel Vitetti	4,729	13.30	+0.81
DVE	Christian Razeau	911	2.56	+0.22
Others	N/A	2,172	6.11	
Turnout		35,558	44.37	−4.64
2nd round result
LR (UDC)	Eric Ciotti	17,737	56.33	+0.12
LREM (Ensemble)	Graig Monetti	13,751	43.67	−0.12
Turnout		31,488	41.29	−5.05
LR hold				

=== 2017 ===
Candidate	Label	First round		Second round	
Candidate	Label	Votes	%	Votes	%
Éric Ciotti	LR	13,630	35.00	19,888	56.21
Caroline Reverso-Meinietti	REM	12,599	32.35	15,493	43.79
Jean-Pierre Daugreilh	FN	4,865	12.49		
Robert Injey	FI	4,116	10.57		
Yann Librati	PS	1,229	3.16		
Christian Razeau	ECO	912	2.34		
Moussa Ba	ECO	388	1.00		
Thomas Calvifiori	DLF	300	0.77		
Sophie Taam	DIV	217	0.56		
Éric Boizet	DIV	216	0.55		
Agnès Benkemoun	EXG	200	0.51		
Michel Cotta	DVD	197	0.51		
Diane Médus	DVG	75	0.19		
Votes		38,944	100.00	35,381	100.00
Valid votes		38,944	98.75	35,381	94.89
Blank votes		320	0.81	1,324	3.55
Null votes		173	0.44	581	1.56
Turnout		39,437	49.01	37,286	46.34
Abstentions		41,029	50.99	43,183	53.66
Registered voters		80,466		80,469	
Source: Ministry of the Interior

=== 2012 ===
Summary of the 10 June and 17 June 2012 French legislative in Alpes-Maritimes's 1st Constituency election results
Candidate	Party		1st round		2nd round	
Candidate	Party		Votes	%	Votes	%
Eric Ciotti	Union for a Popular Movement	UMP	19,971	43.89%	25,473	60.73%
Patrick Allemand	Socialist Party	PS	13,048	28.68%	16,473	39.27%
Jacques Peyrat	Other far-right	EXD	7,351	16.16%		
Robert Injey	Left Front	FG	2,083	4.58%		
Christian Razeau	Centre for France	MoDem	649	1.43%		
Pierre Argentieri	Miscellaneous Right	DVD	503	1.11%		
Maryse Ullmann	Ecologist	ECO	498	1.09%		
Jean-Marc Governatori	Ecologist	ECO	324	0.71%		
Loïc Fortuit	Far Left	EXG	303	0.67%		
Jean-Paul Belhadi	Miscellaneous right	DVD	239	0.53%		
Michel Cotta	Other far-right	EXD	214	0.47%		
Christophe Ricerchi	Far Left	EXG	135	0.30%		
Agnès Benkemoun	Far Left	EXG	86	0.19%		
Alix Horsch Filippi	Regionalist	REG	82	0.18%		
	Jean-Pierre Gastaud	Other	AUT	16	0.04%	
Total			45,502	100%	41,946	100%
Registered voters			82,287		82,287	
Blank/Void ballots			509	1.24%	1,368	2.49%
Turnout			46,011	55.92%	43,314	52.64%
Abstentions			36,276	44.08%	38,973	47.36%
Result					UMP HOLD	

=== 2007 ===
Summary of the 10 June and 17 June 2007 French legislative in Alpes-Maritimes' 1st Constituency election results
Candidate	Party		1st round		2nd round	
Candidate	Party		Votes	%	Votes	%
Eric Ciotti	Union for a Popular Movement	UMP	15,017	44.56%	18,365	60.92%
Patrick Allemand	Socialist Party	PS	7,870	23.35%	11,780	39.08%
Jérôme Rivière	Miscellaneous Right	DVD	3,315	9.84%		
Rémy Francois	National Front	FN	1,977	5.87%		
Hervé Cael	Democratic Movement	MoDem	1,530	4.54%		
Robert Injey	Communist	COM	1,062	3.15%		
Philippe Vardon	Far Right	EXD	773	2.29%		
Mounia Ferriere	The Greens	VEC	474	1.41%		
Michel Francois	Ecologist	ECO	404	1.20%		
Danielle Lisbona	Miscellaneous Right	DVD	332	0.99%		
Christophe Ricerchi	Far Left	EXG	292	0.87%		
Ambre Gomez	Far Left	EXG	265	0.79%		
Jean-Marc Governatori	Divers	DIV	248	0.74%		
Agnès Benkemoun	Far Left	EXG	142	0.42%		
Total			33,701	100%	30,145	100%
Registered voters			58,304		58,292	
Blank/Void ballots			386	1.13%	797	2.58%
Turnout			34,087	58.46%	30,942	53.08%
Abstentions			24,217	41.54%	27,350	46.92%
Result					UMP HOLD	

=== 2002 ===
Legislative Election 2002: Alpes-Maritime's 1st constituency
Party	Candidate	Votes	%	±%
UMP	Jérôme Rivière	9,015	26.57	
PS	Ptrick Allemand	8,827	26.02	
FN	Pierre Argentieri	7,691	22.67	
DVD	Gilbert Stellardo	4,110	12.11	
PCF	Jacques Victor	1,373	4.05	
DVD	Jean-Auguste Icart	960	2.83	
Others	N/A	1,954		
Turnout		34,487	56.02	
2nd round result
UMP	Jérôme Rivière	17,303	58.14	
PS	Ptrick Allemand	12,458	41.86	
Turnout		31,363	50.94	
UMP gain from UDF				

=== 1997 ===
Legislative Election 1997: Alpes-Maritimes's 1st constituency
Party	Candidate	Votes	%	±%
FN	Jean-Pierre Gost	8,792	25.89	
UDF	Charles Ehrmann	7,846	23.10	
PS	Patrick Allemand	6,719	19.78	
PCF	Jacques Victor	3,410	10.04	
DVD	Jean-Marc Governatori	1,560	4.59	
UDF	Jean Icart*	1,513	4.45	
GE	Joël Rigolat	772	2.27	
MPF	Emmanuel Guillon	721	2.12	
Others	N/A	2,629		
Turnout		35,239	57.07	
2nd round result
UDF	Charles Ehrmann	19,360	63.48	
FN	Jean-Pierre Gost	11,136	36.52	
Turnout		35,591	57.62	
UDF hold				

*UDF dissident

== Sources ==
- Official results of French elections from 1998: "Résultats électoraux officiels en France" (in French). Archived from the original on 20 December 2011.
