= Léon Baréty =

French politician (1883–1971)

Léon Jean Jacques Baréty
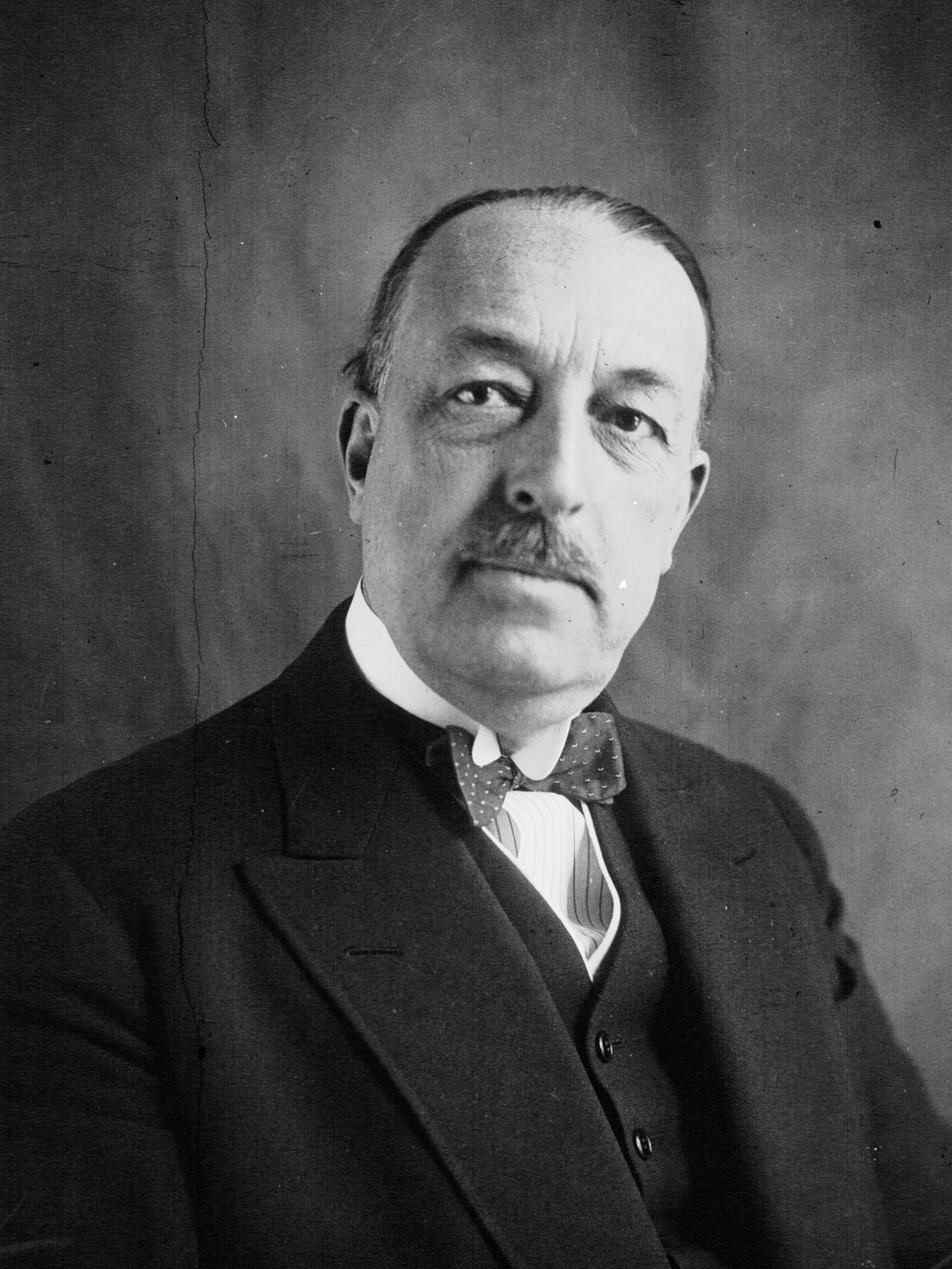

Minister of Industry and Commerce
- In office 18 May 1940 – 5 June 1940
- Prime Minister: Paul Reynaud
- Preceded by: Louis Rollin
- Succeeded by: Albert Chichery

Personal details
- Born: 18 October 1883 Nice, France
- Died: 10 February 1971 (aged 87) Nice, France

Léon Jean Jacques Baréty (18 October 1883 – 10 February 1971) was a French politician who was briefly Minister of Industry and Commerce in 1940.

== Early years (1883–1919 ==
Léon Jean Jacques Baréty was born in Nice on 18 October 1883. His father was Alexandre Baréty, an eminent doctor who was a general councilor of the Alpes-Maritimes from 1880 to 1904. Léon Baréty received his secondary education in the lycée of Nice, then obtained a diploma in Finance from the Ecole des sciences politiques, followed by a doctorate in Law from the Faculty of Paris. His thesis was on the evolution of local banks in France and Germany.

In 1905 Baréty was attached to the office of the Minister of the Interior. In 1910 he was elected councilor-general of the Alpes-Maritimes for the Puget-Théniers canton, an office he held for thirty years. In 1912 he was appointed deputy chief of staff to Paul Deschanel, president of the Chamber of Deputies. He served in the armed forces in World War I (1914–18), and was demobilized in June 1919.

== National politics (1919–41) ==
Baréty was elected deputy for the Alpes-Maritimes on 16 November 1919 on the Left Democratic Republican list. He was reelected on the same list on 11 May 1924. He was a member of the colonial group in the Chamber of Deputies. He became vice-president of this group, and president of the Morocco and Tunisia group. Baréty felt that different forms of rule should be used for different cultural groups, and should be compatible with the local beliefs, laws and customs. In 1924 he pointed out the dilemma of education in the colonies. He said "it would be criminal to leave our native subjects in ignorance". On the other hand, education might "create rebels, discontented, déclassé natives ... plant seeds of rancor in the people who prepare to revolt." He recommended a policy of association rather than assimilation.

Baréty was reelected on the Left Republicans list on 22 April 1928. He was under-secretary of state for Public Education, responsible for technical education, in the first cabinet of André Tardieu (13 November 1929 – 21 February 1930). He was under-secretary of state for the Budget in the second Tardieu cabinet from 2 March 1930 to 14 December 1930. He was elected president of the general council of the Alpes-Maritimes in 1932. In 1932 he published la France au Maroc (France in Morocco), which won awards from the Académie française and the Académie des sciences morales et politiques.

Baréty was reelected to the Chamber of Deputies on the Left Republicans list on 1 May 1932. He was reelected on the list of the Left Republican and Radical Independent Alliance on 26 April 1936. He was Minister of Industry and Commerce in the cabinet of Paul Reynaud from 18 May 1940 to 5 June 1940. On 10 July 1940, he voted in favour of granting the cabinet presided by Marchal Philippe Pétain authority to draw up a new constitution, thereby effectively ending the French Third Republic and establishing Vichy France. Baréty was appointed a member of the Vichy national council during the German occupation of France. He said later, "I did not refuse my appointment to this Council because I thought I would be able to bring to the Government the voice of the country's complaints—and that is what I did."

== Later career (1941–71) ==
Due to his vote on 10 July 1940 Baréty was rendered ineligible for public office after the Liberation of France. He asked for a jury of honor to reverse this ruling, saying, "You have to remember the situation of France in late June 1940, the complete disarray of the population, the exodus of millions of inhabitants, a completely disorganized army whose leaders themselves asked them to lay down their arms." On 24 April 1945 the jury rejected his request. He appealed to the Council of State, which annulled the jury's decision and referred the case to another jury. This jury eventually removed his ineligibility on 17 October 1947.

In March 1953 Baréty was elected municipal councilor for Puget-Théniers. He did not seek reelection in 1957. He became a corporate director, and in 1958 was president of the French committee for Expo 58 in Brussels. In 1960 he was president of the Paris-based International Bureau of Exhibitions (BIE), which decided which city would hold the World Fair each year. Léon Baréty died in Nice on 10 February 1971. He was a commander of the Legion of Honour and a Grand Officer of the Belgian Order of Leopold.

== Publications ==
- Baréty, Léon (1906). preface. L'Homme et l'oeuvre (1813–1881), Clément-Joseph Garnier. By Morel, L.-Adolphe (in French). Saint-Germain-en-Laye: P. Penot. p. 37.
- Baréty, Léon (1908). Université de Paris. Faculté de droit et des sciences économiques (ed.). L'évolution des banques locales en France et en Allemagne. Thèse pour le doctorat (in French). Paris: M. Rivière. p. 191.
- Marlio, Louis; Hersent, Georges; Colson, Clément; Baréty, Léon; Metayer, M. (1921). L'Outillage économique de la France, conférences organisées par la Société des anciens élèves et élèves de l'École libre des sciences politiques. L'Outillage maritime. Les Chemins de fer. Les Forces hydrauliques. Le Tourisme. La Métallurgie (in French). Paris: F. Alcan. p. 239.
- Baréty, Léon (1928). preface. Les Alpes maritimes. By Doublet, Georges. M. L. Foiret (ed.). Départements et pays de France (in French). Paris: impr. P. Dupont ; libr. A. Michel. p. 348.
- Barety, Léon (1932). La France au Maroc. F. Carbonnel. p. 241.
- Baréty, Léon (1955). introduction. Centenaire du Maréchal Lyautey. By Goulven, Joseph (in French). Paris: Comité de l'Afrique française et Comité du Maroc (impr. de Peyronnet). p. 32.
- Baréty, Léon (1956). preface. Oran et les témoins de son passé, récits historiques et anecdotiques. By Cruck, Eugène (in French). Eugène Valentin, illus.; Marcel Houdou, phot. Oran: Heintz frères. p. 318.

== Sources ==
- Azeyeh, Albert (2010). Réussite scolaire, faillite sociale: généalogie mentale de la crise de l'Afrique noire francophone. African Books Collective. ISBN 978-9956-616-27-5.
- collectif (1992). Dictionnaire des parlementaires français de 1940 à 1958 (in French). Vol. 2. B. Paris: La Documentation française.
- Jolly, Jean (1960–1977). "Baréty (Léon Jean Jacques)". Dictionnaire des parlementaires français; notices biographiques sur les ministres, députés et sénateurs français de 1889 à 1940 (in French). Paris: Presses universitaires de France. ISBN 2-1100-1998-0.
- Lagana, Marc (1990-01-01). Le Parti Colonial Français: Éléments d'Histoire. PUQ. ISBN 978-2-7605-2304-3.
- "Léon, Jean, Jacques BARÉTY – Mandats". Sycomore (in French). Assemblée nationale.
- Lownsbrough, John (2012-04-17). The History of Canada Series: The Best Place To Be: Expo '67 And Its Time. Penguin Canada. ISBN 978-0-14-318401-0.
- Wieviorka, Olivier (2009). Orphans of the Republic: The Nation's Legislators in Vichy France. Harvard University Press. ISBN 978-0-674-03261-3.
- Wilder, Gary (2005-12-15). The French Imperial Nation-State: Negritude and Colonial Humanism Between the Two World Wars. University of Chicago Press. ISBN 978-0-226-89772-1.
