= Palais Baréty =

Historic building in Nice, Alpes-Maritimes, France

Coordinates: 43.6984°N 7.2638°E

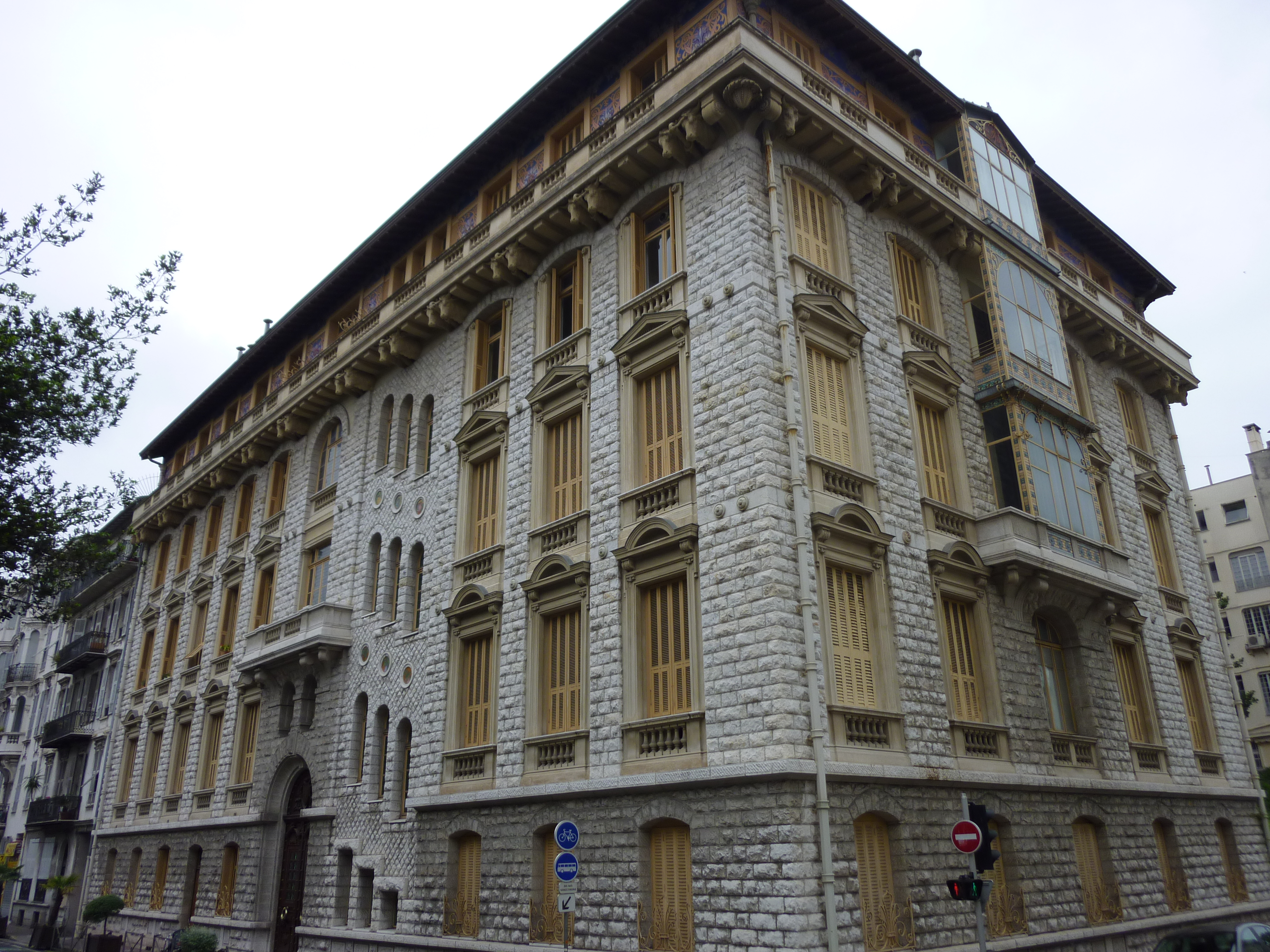
- Interactive map of the Palais Baréty area

Design and construction
- Architect: Lucien Barbet

Palais Baréty is a historic building in Nice, Alpes-Maritimes, France. It was built in 1897 for Alexandre Baréty, a physician. It was designed by architect Lucien Barbet. It has been listed as an official national monument since June 16, 1996.
