= Jean Médecin =

French lawyer and politician

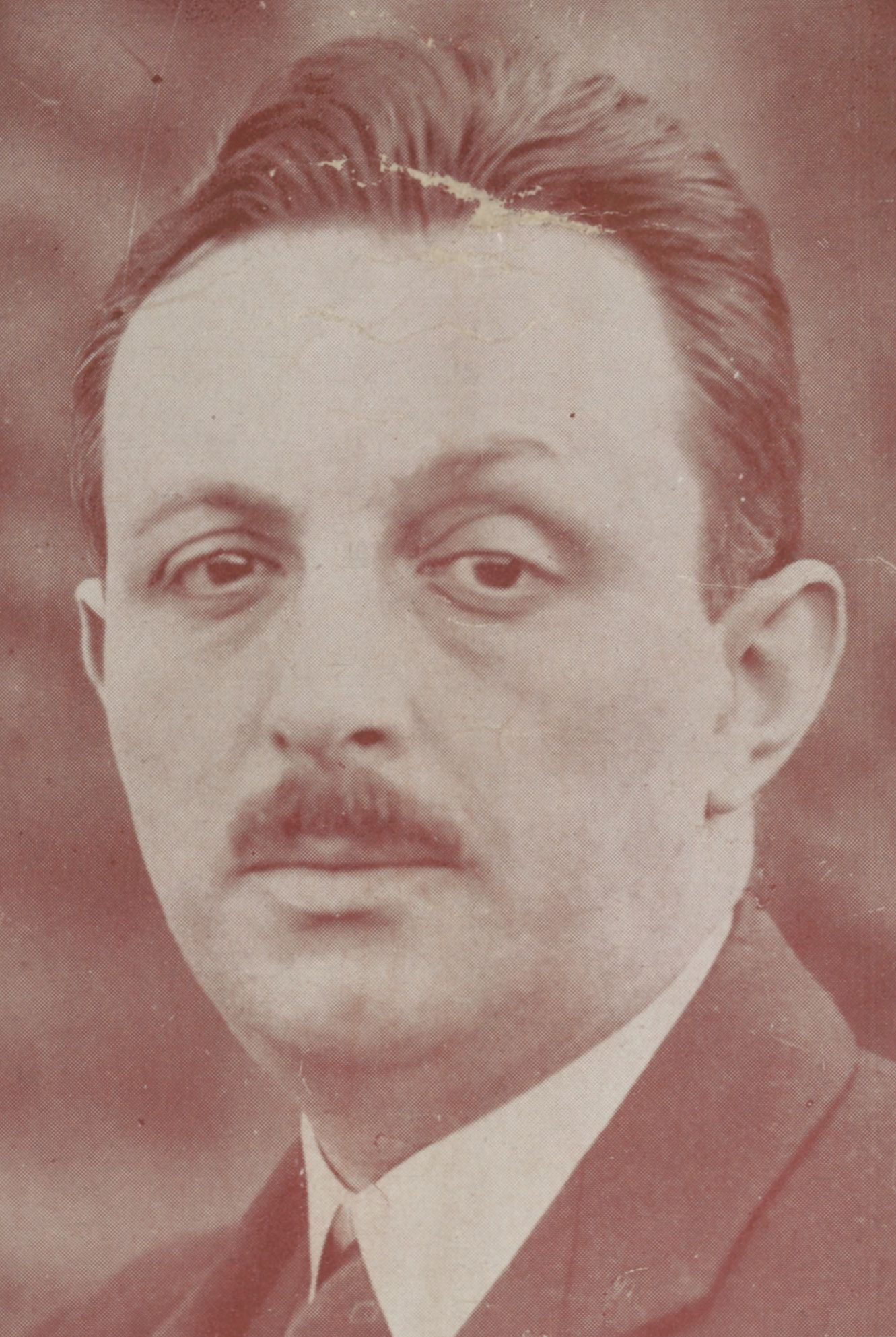

Mayor of Nice
- In office 1947–1965
- Preceded by: Jacques Cotta
- Succeeded by: Jacques Médecin

Personal details
- Born: 2 December 1890 Nice, France
- Died: 18 December 1965 (aged 75) Nice, France
- Children: Jacques Médecin
- Education: Lycée Masséna

Jean Médecin (2 December 1890 – 18 November 1965) was a French lawyer and politician. He was Mayor of Nice, France from 1928 to 1943 and from 1947 to 1965, and the father of Jacques Médecin, who succeeded him as mayor until 1990.

== Before the war ==
He was born in Nice to a respectable family. After studying in Paris, he joined the military and fought in the First World War. In 1914 he was promoted to corporal, then in 1916 to the rank of captain. After the battle of Verdun he was awarded the French Legion of Honour and the Croix de Guerre.

Upon his return to Nice in 1919, he briefly practised as a lawyer before entering politics. In 1919, he was elected as a Municipal Councillor, and in 1928, Mayor of Nice. He achieved notoriety when he was allowed to stay as mayor for 34 years. He was elected Councillor General of Sospel (1931), then deputy of the first circumscription of Nice (1932).

Politically republican, democratic, independent and moderate, he sat within the left-leaning independents, then moved more to the centre with the local political party he created called “Le Rassemblement des Indépendants” (“The Assembly of Independents”). However, Médecin increasingly moved toward the far right, and joined Jacques Doriot's fascist Parti Populaire Français in 1936.

Elected Senator of the Alpes-Maritimes in 1939, he voted with enthusiasm for the giving of full powers to Maréchal Philippe Pétain, whom he wanted to conserve his mandates. But in 1942, he did not support the Italian fascists then in occupation of Nice. In open dispute with the government, he was removed from his mayorship in 1943. He fled to Avignon and then to Annot, but he was arrested in 1944 and incarcerated in Nice. He was moved to Belfort in the same year, where he was able to escape captivity.

== After the war ==
On his return to Nice after the Second World War, he was accused of collaborating with the Vichy Regime, and lost some standing in the municipal elections. However, little by little he got back his former positions, and finally reclaimed the mayor’s seat in 1947. Médecin was a bitter opponent of Gaullism.

In 1951 he was elected President of the General Council of the Alpes-Maritimes, and in 1953, he became a candidate for the presidential election. From March 1955 to January 1965, he was designated Secretary of State by Edgar Faure. In the presidential election of 1965 he ferociously opposed Charles de Gaulle.

In 1961, he handed over many mandates to his son, Jacques Médecin, who succeeded him as mayor of Nice after his death. He died in office.
