= Christian Estrosi =

French sportsman and politician (born 1955)

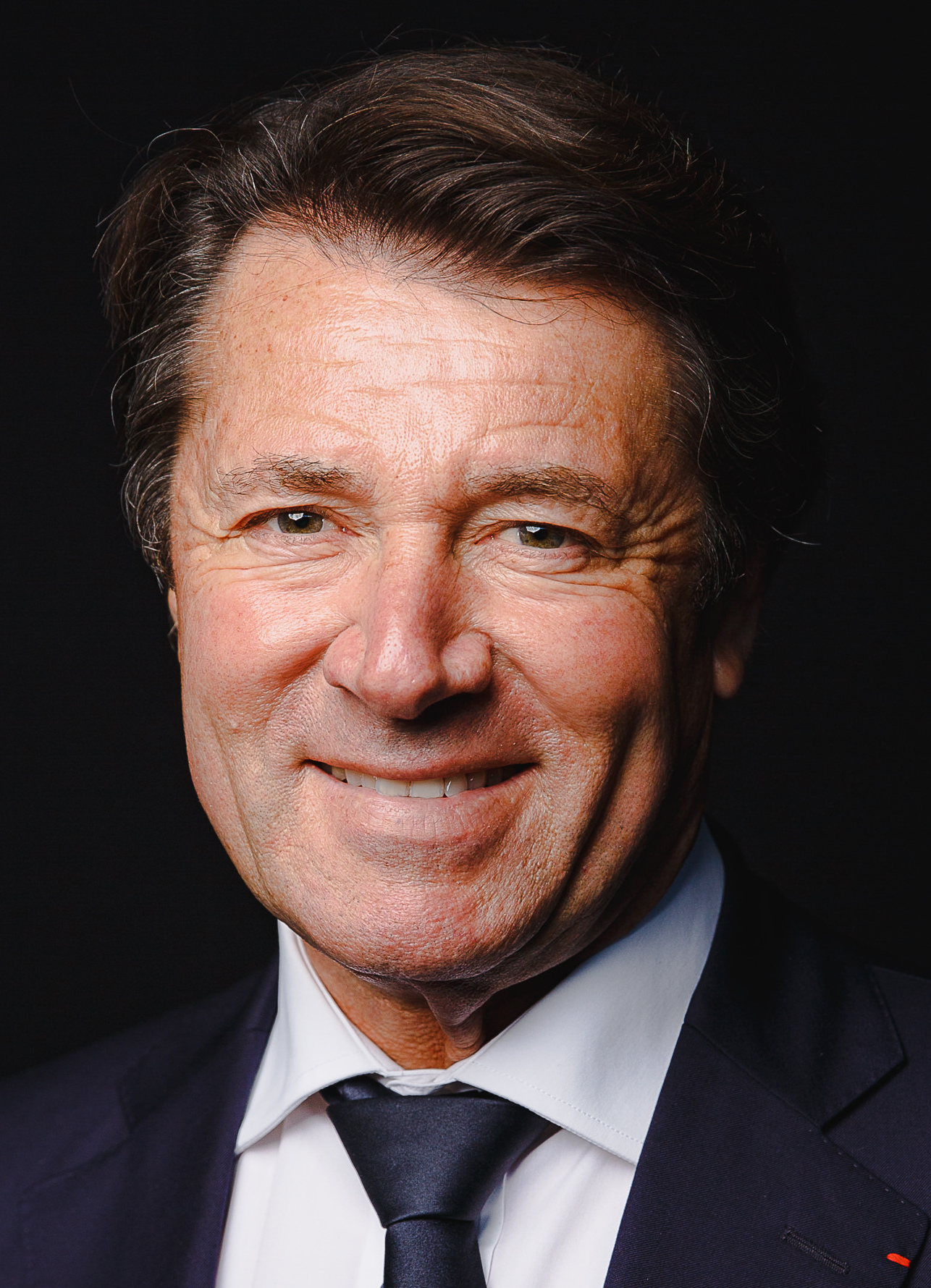

Mayor of Nice
- In office 15 May 2017 – 27 March 2026
- Preceded by: Philippe Pradal
- Succeeded by: Éric Ciotti
- In office 21 March 2008 – 13 June 2016
- Preceded by: Jacques Peyrat
- Succeeded by: Philippe Pradal

President of the Regional Council of Provence-Alpes-Côte d'Azur
- In office 18 December 2015 – 8 May 2017
- Preceded by: Michel Vauzelle
- Succeeded by: Renaud Muselier

Deputy Minister of Industry
- In office 23 June 2009 – 13 November 2010
- Prime Minister: François Fillon
- Preceded by: Office created
- Succeeded by: Éric Besson

Secretary of State for the Overseas
- In office 19 June 2007 – 17 March 2008
- Prime Minister: François Fillon
- Preceded by: Hervé Mariton
- Succeeded by: Yves Jégo

Deputy Minister of Spatial Planning
- In office 2 June 2005 – 15 May 2007
- Prime Minister: Dominique de Villepin
- Preceded by: Frédéric de Saint-Sernin
- Succeeded by: Hubert Falco

President of the General Council of Alpes-Maritimes
- In office 18 September 2003 – 14 December 2008
- Preceded by: Charles Ange Ginésy
- Succeeded by: Éric Ciotti

Personal details
- Born: Christian Paul Gilbert Estrosi; 1 July 1955 (age 71) Nice, France
- Party: La France Audacieuse (since 2017)
- Other political affiliations: Rally for the Republic (1988–2002); Union for a Popular Movement (2002–2015); The Republicans (2015–2021); Horizons (since 2021)
- Spouse(s): Dominique Estrosi Sassone (1995–2016); Laura Tenoudji (2016–present)
- Children: 3
- Profession: Motorcyclist, politician

Christian Estrosi
Motorcycle racing career statistics
Grand Prix motorcycle racing
Active years	1976–1983
First race	1976 500cc Finnish Grand Prix
Last race	1983 250cc Swedish Grand Prix
Starts / Wins / Podiums / Poles / F. laps / Points; 31 / 0 / 0 / 1 / 0

Christian Paul Gilbert Estrosi (French: [kʁistjɑ̃ ɛstʁozi]; born 1 July 1955) is a French sportsman and former politician. He was the Mayor of Nice from 2008 to 2026. A former professional motorcyclist, he served as a government minister under Presidents Jacques Chirac and Nicolas Sarkozy. Estrosi also served as President of the Regional Council of Provence-Alpes-Côte d'Azur from 2015 to 2017 and First Deputy Mayor of Nice from 2016 until 2017. He is a former member of The Republicans, which he left in 2021 to join Horizons.

== Early life ==
Estrosi was born on 1 July 1955 in Nice. His grandparents were immigrants from Italy.

== Motorcycle racing ==
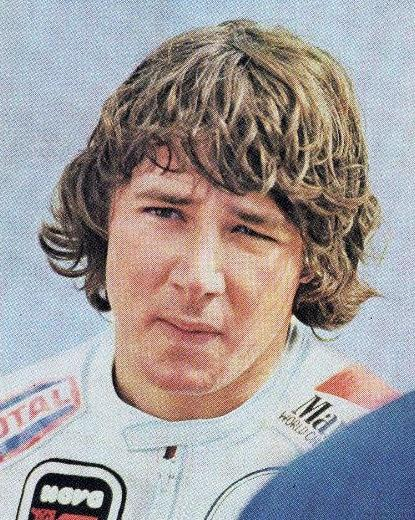
Christian Entrosi, Panini Moto Sport 1979, #35

Estrosi was a professional motorcycle racer and competed at the world championship level in Grand Prix motorcycle racing from 1976 to 1983. He won the French round of the 1976 Formula 750 season at the Circuit Paul Armagnac. He also had a fourth-place finish in the 1978 500cc French Grand Prix. He repeated this result in 1979 with a fourth place at the 1979 250cc Spanish Grand Prix. He received the Youth and Sports gold medal.

== Political career ==
=== Early beginnings ===
Estrosi was a member of the municipal council of Nice from 1983 to 1990, when he resigned.

=== Career in national politics ===
Estrosi served as a member of the National Assembly of France for the 5th constituency of Alpes-Maritimes from 1988 to 1993, then from 1997 to 2005, from 2008 to 2009, then from 2010 to 2016. In 1993, he briefly served as the MP for the department's 2nd constituency but his election was ruled invalid. In Parliament, he served on the Committee on Cultural Affairs (1998–1993, 1996–2002), the Committee on Finance (2012–2016) and the Committee on Legal Affairs (2002–2005, 2008–2012).

In addition, Estrosi held several ministerial positions in the national government in Paris. He was appointed on 2 June 2005 as Deputy Minister of Spatial Planning in the government of Prime Minister Dominique de Villepin, serving under Minister of the Interior Nicolas Sarkozy. He was then appointed on 19 June 2007 as Secretary of State for the Overseas French territories (DOM-TOM), this time serving under Michèle Alliot-Marie. From 2009 to 2010, he served as Deputy Minister of Industry. During his time in office, he was widely seen as a close ally of Sarkozy.

=== Career in municipal politics ===
Estrosi was a regional councillor of Provence-Alpes-Côte d'Azur from 1992 to 2002 and served as a regional council vice president from 1992 to 1998 under the presidency of Jean-Claude Gaudin. He later served as one of the vice presidents of the General Council of Alpes-Maritimes from 2001 to 2003 and as its president from 2003 to 2008. He was first elected a general councillor in the canton of Nice-8 in 1985.

Estrosi was reelected to the municipal council of Nice in the 2008 election, when he was also elected Mayor of Nice. In addition, he has served as president of the Urban community of Nice Côte d'Azur from 2008 and president of Métropole Nice Côte d'Azur from 2012 to 2024. In 2013, he rejected a plan to build a mosque funded by a businessman from Saudi Arabia in Nice.

As part of a reorganization of the Union for a Popular Movement (later Republicans) leadership under their chairman Jean-François Copé in January 2013, Estrosi became – alongside Henri de Raincourt, Jean-Claude Gaudin, Brice Hortefeux, Roger Karoutchi and Gérard Longuet – one of the party's six vice-presidents. Ahead of the UMP's leadership election in 2014, he led a group supporting Nicolas Sarkozy as the party's leader.

In The Republicans' 2016 primary, Estrosi also endorsed Sarkozy as the party's candidate for the 2017 presidential election. Ten months ahead of the election, he and other local conservatives aggressively criticised Socialist Minister of the Interior Bernard Cazeneuve for the lack of strength of the National Police force presence on the night the 2016 Nice truck attack. Amid the Fillon affair, in March 2017, Estrosi joined Xavier Bertrand, Valérie Pécresse and others in calling for Alain Juppé to replace François Fillon as the party's candidate. Also, he met with Emmanuel Macron during his campaign.

On 8 May 2017, the day after the second round of the presidential election, Estrosi announced his resignation from the presidency of the Regional Council of Provence-Alpes-Côte d'Azur to become Mayor of Nice again, succeeding his former first deputy, Philippe Pradal. Estrosi is still managing the region as one of Regional Council President Renaud Muselier's vice presidents. Overseeing the local authorities' response to the COVID-19 pandemic in France, Estrosi called in early 2021 for a weekend lockdown in the area to reduce the flow of tourists; at the time, Nice had a level of COVID-19 infections triple the national rate.

In 2021, Estrosi left The Republicans to join Édouard Philippe's Horizons party, after Toulon Mayor Hubert Falco. Provence-Alpes-Côte d'Azur Regional Council President Renaud Muselier also left The Republicans that year, marking a loss of elected officials in the area for the party. L'Obs nicknamed the three politicians the "infernal trio of the Provençal right". He withdrew from political life after failing to be re-elected in March 2026 and announced he would focus on his family.

== Other activities ==
- Chorégies d'Orange, Member of the Board of Directors

== Political positions ==
Estrosi was among conservative politicians in France who backed calls for a ban on the body-covering burkini swimsuit that some Muslim women wear on the beach, which was later invalidated by French courts. In 2016, he threatened to sue people who distributed photographs of an incident in which Nice police ordered a Muslim woman to remove her burkini, saying that circulating the photographs would "provoke defamatory remarks and threats against police agents". In 2017, Estrosi distanced himself from his earlier decision to vote in favour of an unsuccessful 1988 bill on the reinstatement of the death penalty.

Estrosi is a supporter of Israel. In 2021, he hung the Israeli flag outside the city hall in Nice after supporting a ban on pro-Palestine protests. In December 2023, Estrosi faced backlash after claiming that mothers in Gaza use "dolls" as "dead bodies". In June 2025, a French court ordered Estrosi to remove Israeli flags from the city hall, deciding that the gesture violated the "principle of neutrality" in public services since it constituted a political message.

Estrosi was a main supporter of the implementation in Nice of the Israeli security application Carbyne, sharply criticizing CNIL's decision to ban it on the grounds that it was "too intrusive" and its legal basis was fragile. Estrosi commented the decision would only benefit the terrorists. In the Carnival of 2019, Estrosi implemented the facial recognition technology from the similarly Israeli Anyvision.

== Recognition ==
Estrosi is the recipient of a Doctorate Honoris Causa from the University of Haifa in Israel. He is a Knight of the Legion of Honour from the French Republic, an Officer of the Order of Merit of the Republic of Poland, and a Commander of the Order of Saint-Charles from Monaco.

== Controversy ==
In 2017, Estrosi filed a defamation suit against Marine Le Pen for accusing him of being in league with Islamist militants; as a consequence, the European Parliament lifted Le Pen's immunity from prosecution.

== Personal life ==
Estrosi was married to Dominique Sassone, daughter of Jean Sassone (1931–2006), who served as Deputy Mayor of Nice from 1977 to 1998. Early on during the COVID-19 pandemic in France, Estrosi tested positive for the SARS-CoV-2 virus.
