= Charles Ange Ginésy =

French politician

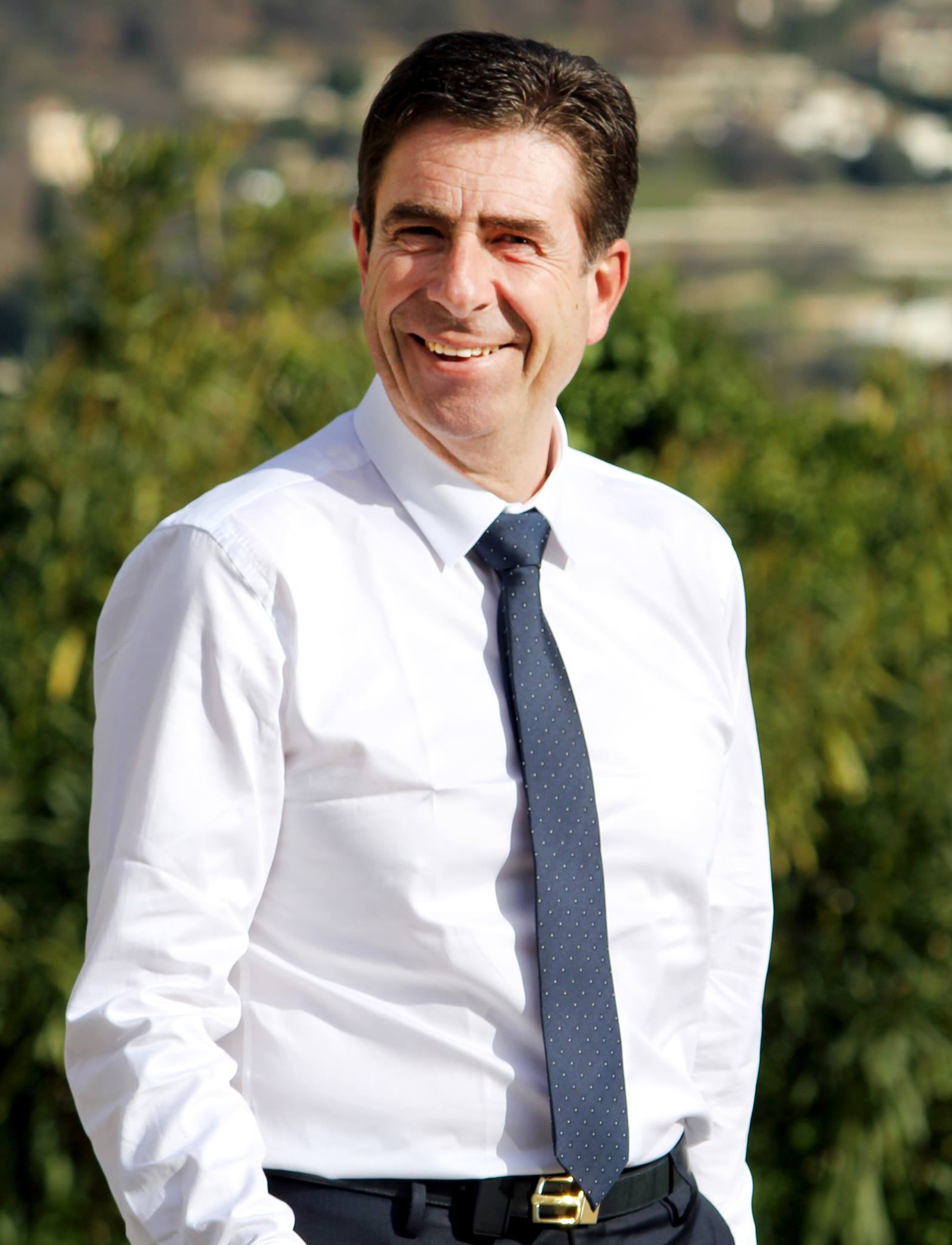

Member of Parliament for Alpes-Maritimes's 5th constituency
- In office 20 June 2012 – 20 June 2017
- Preceded by: Christian Estrosi
- Succeeded by: Christian Estrosi

Personal details
- Born: 14 May 1956 (age 70) Nice, France
- Party: The Republicans (France)

Charles Ange Ginésy (born 14 May 1956, Nice) is a French politician. He is an operator of ski lifts and a hotelier. He serves as the Les Républicains party president of the departmental council of Alpes-Maritimes, as well as the first deputy mayor of Péone and the president of the Alpes d'Azur community of municipalities.

== Biography ==
Charles Ange Ginésy was born on 14 May 1956, the son of the former senator and former president of the departmental council of Alpes-Maritimes, Charles Ginésy.

In 1989, he was elected to the municipal council and appointed as the first deputy mayor. In 2001, he succeeded Charles Ginésy by being elected Mayor of the municipality of Péone-Valberg.

In 2008, he was elected under his name as mayor, with his list gathering nearly 92.5% of the votes in the first round. He was re-elected as mayor of Péone-Valberg in 2014 with 90.49% of the votes. That same year, he was elected president of the National Association of Mayors of Mountain Resorts.

=== Chairman of the departmental council ===
In 2017, Charles Ange Ginésy was elected president of the departmental council of Alpes-Maritimes, as the law prohibiting Eric Ciotti from combining his role as a deputy with the presidency of the departmental council came into effect.

In 2021, he was re-elected as president of the departmental council with 100% of the expressed votes. However, hundreds of documents posted online in 2022 by a hacker revealed that Ciotti, officially a mere departmental counselor, remained the actual decision-maker.

Le Monde reported that the departmental council was using the department's finances for political purposes, using them as a means of pressure against local adversaries of Eric Ciotti, especially Christian Estrosi. Some associations opposing certain projects of the mayor of Nice received substantial subsidies, while villages allegedly saw their allocations decrease following a dispute between their mayor and Eric Ciotti. Renaud Muselier, the president of the Provence-Alpes-Côte d'Azur region, denounced what he referred to as the "Ciotti system": "You're either with them or against them. They decide to punish mayors with pressures, manipulations, and bans".

=== National Assembly ===
In 1997, he became the substitute for Christian Estrosi, the deputy of the fifth constituency of Alpes-Maritimes. He started sitting in the National Assembly on 3 July 2005, following Christian Estrosi's appointment as Minister Delegate for Regional Planning in the Villepin government. He served until the end of the XII legislature on 19 June 2007.

During the legislative elections of 2007, he once again ran as the substitute for Christian Estrosi, who won. When Estrosi was appointed Secretary of State for Overseas Territories in the Fillon government on 19 June 2007, Charles Ange Ginésy resumed his seat in the Palais Bourbon starting 20 July 2007. He resigned from his position as deputy on 1 April 2008, following Christian Estrosi's departure from the government. After Christian Estrosi was appointed Minister for Industry, Charles Ange Ginésy replaced him once again in the National Assembly starting from 23 July 2009.

On 17 June 2012, he was elected as the UMP deputy of the second constituency of Alpes-Maritimes.
