= Caroline Dubois =

Caroline Dubois may refer to:

- Caroline Dubois (boxer) (born 2001), British amateur boxer
- Caroline Dubois (poet) (born 1960), French poet
