= Derrida (disambiguation) =

Jacques Derrida (1930–2004) was an Algerian-born French philosopher.

Derrida may also refer to:

- Bernard Derrida (born 1952), French theoretical physicist
- Marguerite Derrida (born Marguerite Aucouturier; 1932–2020), Czech-born French psychoanalyst, wife of Jacques
- Derrida (film), a 2002 American documentary film about Jacques Derrida
- " Jacques Derrida", a song by Scritti Politti from their 1982 album Songs to Remember

== See also ==
- RErideD: Derrida, who leaps through time, a 2018 anime
