= Gender wars =

Gender wars may refer to:

- Conflict between the anti-gender movement and its opponents
- Conflict between different feminist views on transgender topics
- Gender Wars, a documentary about transgender issues
- Gender Wars, a video game
- The Gender War, a documentary about feminism in Sweden
- War of the Genders, a Hong Kong TV sitcom

== See also ==
- Culture war
- Battle of the Sexes
