= Suzanne Doppelt =

French writer and photographer

- Born: May 5, 1965 (age 61)
- Occupations: Writer; photographer

Suzanne Doppelt (born May 5, 1965) is a contemporary French writer and photographer, living in Paris. She studied philosophy and teaches photography at the European Graduate School in Saas-Fee, Switzerland.

Suzanne Doppelt has exhibited at several venues, including New York University, Deutsches Haus, Centre Culturel Français, Damas; Ecole des Beaux Arts de Nîmes; Pavillon des Arts, Paris; Centre Georges Pompidou, Paris; and Galerie Pennings in Eindhoven, the Netherlands.

== Publications ==
- Kub Or, with Pierre Alféri, P.O.L, 1994
- Mange, éditions Snapshot, 1995
- Just from Cynthia, Alberto Sorbelli, CD rom, Centre Georges Pompidou, 1996
- L'hypothèse du château, éditions Snapshot, 1997
- 36 chandelles, Cronopio/AFAA,1998
- Dans la reproduction en 2 parties égales, with Anne Portugal, P.O.L, 1999
- 13 superstitions, with Manuela Morgaine, éditions Créaphis, 1999
- Raptus, éditions de l'Attente, 2000
- Totem, P.O.L, 2002
- 1990–2004 : Revues Antigone, Vis à Vis international, Revue de littérature générale, Vacarme, Parallax, Rhinocéros
- La 4 ème des plaies vole, Inventaire/Invention éditions, 2004
- Quelque chose cloche, P.O.L, 2004 :
- Le pré est vénéneux. P.O.L., 2007
- Lazy Suzie. P.O.L., November 2009
- Humorous poems by Pierre Alféri, accompanied by Doppelt's photographs, modelled on the packaging of the French bouillon " Bouillons Kub ".

== Personal exhibitions ==
- 1994 : Cultural centre, Cerisy-la-Salle
- 1995 : Galerie Snapshot, Amiens
- 1996 : University of Amiens
- 1999 : Centre méditerranéen de la photographie, Bastia
- 2000 : Galerie Pennings, Hollande, University of Lyon
- 2001 : Institut français de Naples, Le Pavillon, Pantin
- 2002 : FNAC, Paris and provinces
- 2003 : Château de Châteaudun
- 2004 : galerie Eof, Paris
- 2004 : Abbey of Royaumont
- 2006 : New York University, Deutsches Haus

== Collective exhibitions ==
- 1996 : Centre Georges Pompidou
- 1998 : Galerie du Lézard, Colmar
- 1999 : Galerie Pierre Brullé, Paris, Centre photographique de Lectoure
- 2000 : Galerie Brownstone, Paris
- 2001 : Espace Saint-Jacques, St Quentin
- 2003 : ST'ART, Strasbourg
- 2005 : Pavillon des Arts, Paris
