= Aucouturier =

Aucouturier is a surname. Notable people with the surname include:

- Hippolyte Aucouturier (1876–1944), French road bicycle racer
- Marguerite Aucouturier (1932–2020), Czech-born French psychoanalyst
