= Allegory of the Earth =

Series of paintings

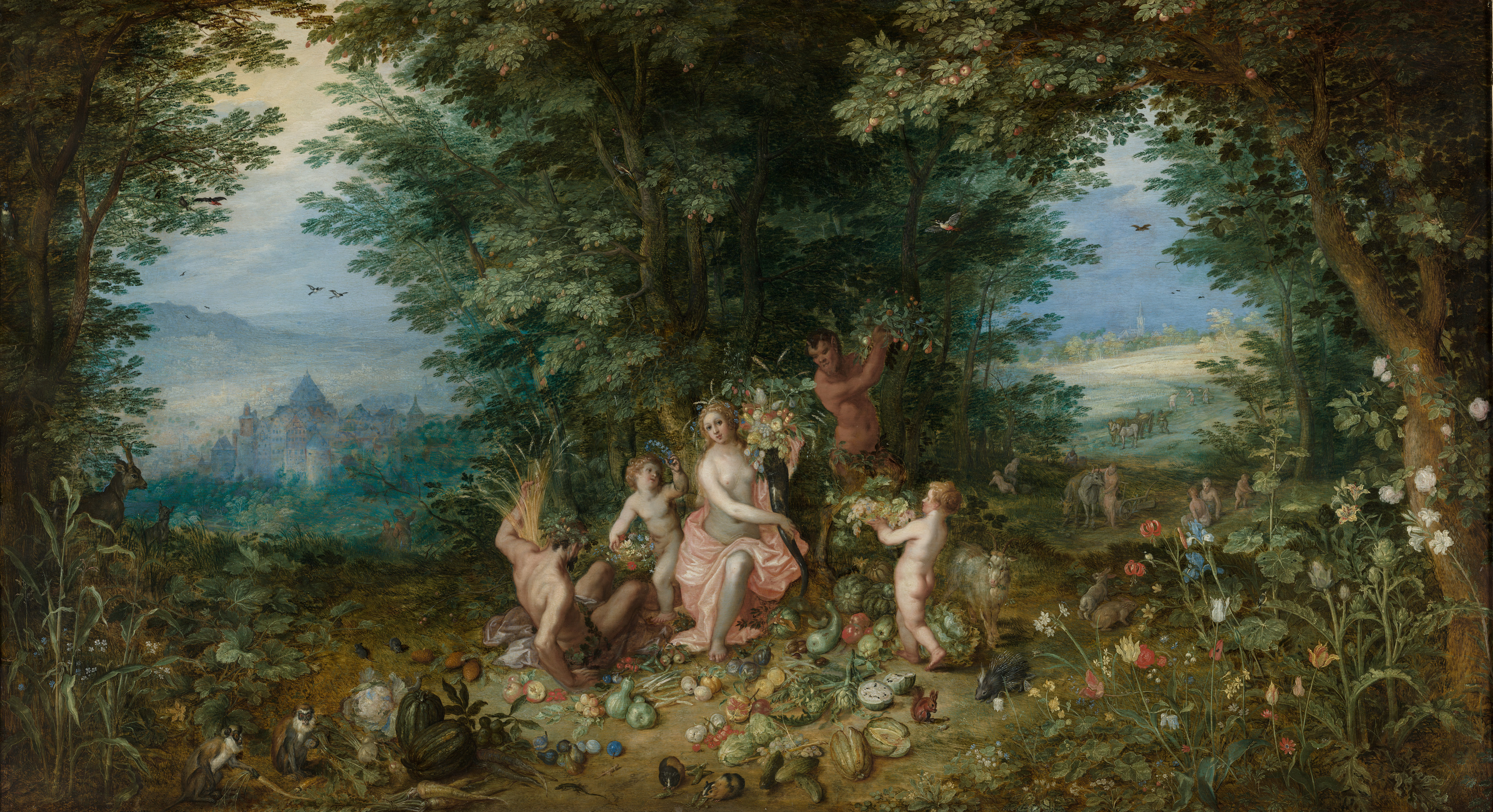
Allegory of the Earth (c. 1610) by Jan Brueghel the Elder

Allegory of the Earth is a series of paintings by Jan Brueghel the Elder produced c. 1610. One painting from the series is in the Musée des Beaux-Arts de Nice and another is in the Musée des Beaux-Arts de Lyon.

== Story ==
One of these paintings was stolen with 4 other paintings in 2007, before being found in Marseilles in 2008.

It is highlighted during the illuminations of the Place des Terreaux during the Festival of Lights in 2014.
