= Gustav-Adolf Mossa =

French painter (1883–1971)

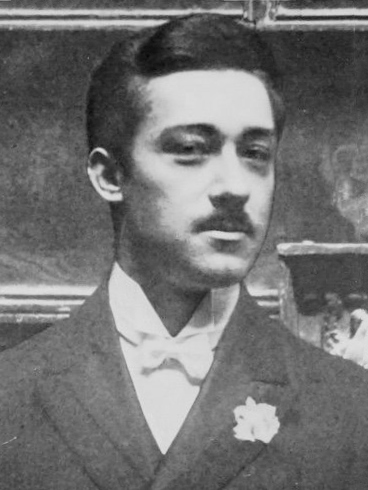
- Mossa in 1908
- Born: 28 January 1883; Nice, France
- Died: 25 May 1971 (aged 88)
- Occupations: Museum Curator, Illustrator, Writer, Painter

Gustav-Adolf Mossa (28 January 1883 – 25 May 1971) was a French illustrator, playwright, essayist, curator and late Symbolist painter.

== Early life ==
Mossa was born 28 January 1883 in Nice, to an Italian mother, Marguerite Alfieri, and Alexis Mossa, an artist, founding curator of the Musée des Beaux-Arts de Nice (Nice Museum of Fine Arts) and organiser of the Nice Carnival from 1873.

== Art and theatre work ==
Mossa received his initial artistic training from his father before studying at the School of Decorative Arts in Nice until 1900, where he became acquainted with Art Nouveau and was later introduced to the Symbolist movement after visiting the Exposition Universelle in the same year. Mossa was heavily inspired by the art of Symbolist painter Gustave Moreau and Symbolist writers, such as Charles Baudelaire, Stéphane Mallarmé, Jules Barbey d'Aurevilly and Joris-Karl Huysmans.

The main body of Mossa's public and private art work was created with water colours and strong ink lines, the subjects including caricatures, Carnival or medieval scenes, portraits and landscapes, with a fascination for the French Riveria in particular. He also created wooden reliefs, designed theatre scenery, wrote literary essays and created book illustrations, including a large series of drawings for the work of Robert Schumann.

In 1902 he began collaborating with his father on the Nice Carnival project, designing floats and posters. Both father and son are still celebrated for raising the Carnival's prestige, and the event continues to be a major, large scale tourism attraction in Nice.

=== Symbolist paintings ===
Mossa's decade long Symbolist period (1900–1911) was his most prolific and began as a reaction to the recent boom of socialite leisure activity on the French Rivera, his works comically satirising or condemning what was viewed as an increasingly materialistic society and the perceived danger of the emerging New Woman at the turn of the century, whom Mossa appears to consider perverse by nature.

His most common subjects were femme fatale figures, some from Biblical sources, such as modernised versions of Judith, Delilah and Salome, mythological creatures such as Harpies or more contemporary and urban figures, such as his towering and dominant bourgeoise woman in Woman of Fashion and Jockey. (1906) His 1905 work Elle, the logo for the 2017 Geschlechterkampf exhibition on representations of gender in art, is an explicit example of Mossa's interpretation of malevolent female sexuality, with a nude giantess sitting atop a pile of bloodied corpses, a fanged cat sitting over her crotch, and wearing an elaborate headress inscribed with the Latin hoc volo, sic jubeo, sit pro ratione voluntas (What I want, I order, my will is reason enough).

Many aspects of Mossa's paintings of this period were also indictive of the decadent movement, with his references to Diabolism, depictions of lesbianism (such as his two paintings of Sappho), or an emphasis on violent, sadistic or morbid scenes.

Though these paintings are the subject of most present day exhibitions, scholarly articles and books on the artist, they were not released to the public until after Mossa's death in 1971.

In 1911, Mossa discovered Flemish Primitive and Gothic art while in Brugge and abandoned Symbolism.

=== Theatre ===
Mossa wrote several operas and plays, and contributed to a revival of dialectal theater with his first theatrical piece Lou Nouvé o sia lou pantai de Barb' Anto (1922), written in the Niçard dialect. Following the play's success, Mossa established the Lou Teatre de Barba Martin group, who performed his comedies 'Phygaço' (1924), 'La Tina' (1926) and 'Lou Rei Carneval' (1935), until 1940. His plays are still performed in Nice.

=== Gallery work and later life ===
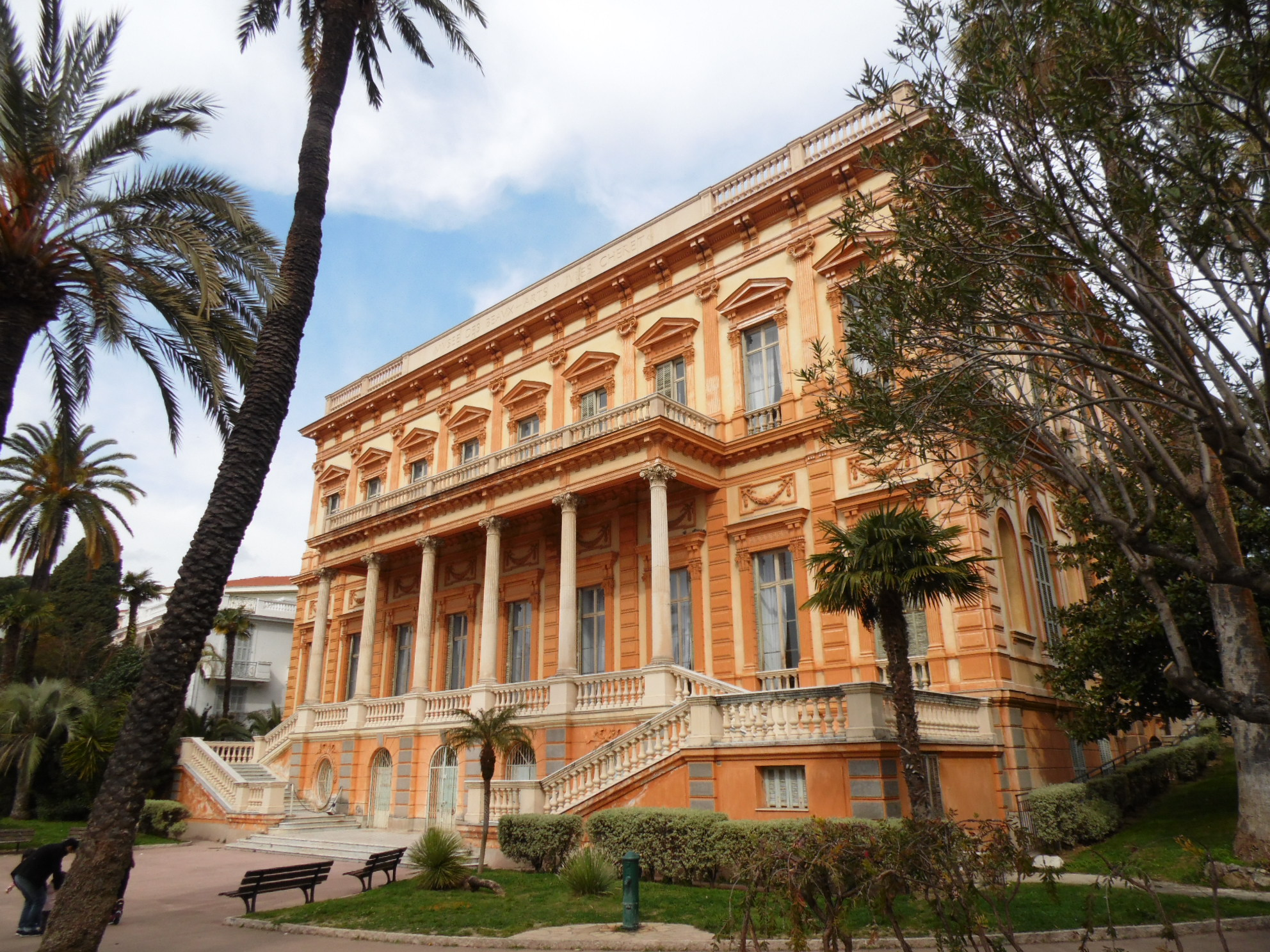
Musée des Beaux-Arts de Nice, where Mossa worked as curator for over forty years

After the death of his father, Alexis, Mossa took over the curation of the Nice Museum of Fine Arts in 1927 and would keep the position until his death in 1971. Mossa would later bequeath most of his own artistic pieces to the gallery.

From the end of the Second World War, Mossa devoted himself to creating works about the City of Nice, illustrating official documents, drawing armorial bearings and traditional suits of the County, and producing several watercolours of the region's landscapes.

== Personal life ==
In 1908 he married Charlotte-Andrée Naudin, whom he divorced in 1918. He married again in 1925 to Lucrèce Roux, until her death in 1955. He was married a final time in 1956 to Marie–Marcelle Butteli, until his death on 25 May 1971.

== Exhibitions and collections ==
=== Exhibitions ===
Permanent

- The Musée-Galerie d' Alexis at Gustav Adolf Mossa is a museum dedicated to Mossa and his father in Nice
- His works are part of The Fin-de-Siècle Museum section of the Royal Museums of Fine Arts of Belgium.

Solo

- 1909 Nice, L'Artistique, Exposition d'oeuvres d'Alexis et de Gustav Adolf Mossa
- 1911 Paris, Galerie Georges Petit, Exposition d'oeuvres de G.A. Mossa
- 1913 Nice, Musée Municipal, Exposition d'images sur l'oeuvre de Schumann par G.A. Mossa
- 1913 Paris, Galeries George Petit, Exposition d'images de G.A. Mossa, inspirées par l 'oeuvre de Schumann
- 1974 Nice, Musée Jules Chéret, Alexis et Gustav Adolf Mossa, peintres niçois
- 1978 Nice, Galeries des Ponchettes, Gustave Adolf Mossa et les symboles
- 1989 Yokohama, Galerie Motomachi, Gustave Adolf Mossa
- 1992 Paris, Pavillon des Arts, G. A. Mossa: L'Oeuvre symboliste 1903–1918'
- 2010 Belgium, Felicien Rops Museum, L'oeuvre Secrète de Gustav-Adolf Mossa

Group

- 1976 Paris, Espace Pierre Cardin, Exposition Sarah Bernhardt
- 1981 Chicago, The David & Alfred Smart Gallery, University of Chicago, The Earthly Chimera and the Femme Fatale: Fear of Women in 19th Century Art
- 2008 Évian-les-Bains, Palais Lumière, Eros and Thanatos
- 2015 Sacramento, Crocker Art Museum, Toulouse-Lautrec and La Vie Moderne: Paris 1880–1910
- 2015 Paris, Musée d'Orsay, Splendour and Misery. Pictures of Prostitution, 1850–1910
- 2017 Frankfurt, Städel-Museum, Geschlechterkampf

== See also ==
- Aubrey Beardsley
- Félicien Rops
- Fin-de-siecle
- Belle Époque
