= Geschlechterkampf =

Art exhibition at the Städel in Frankfurt

Elle
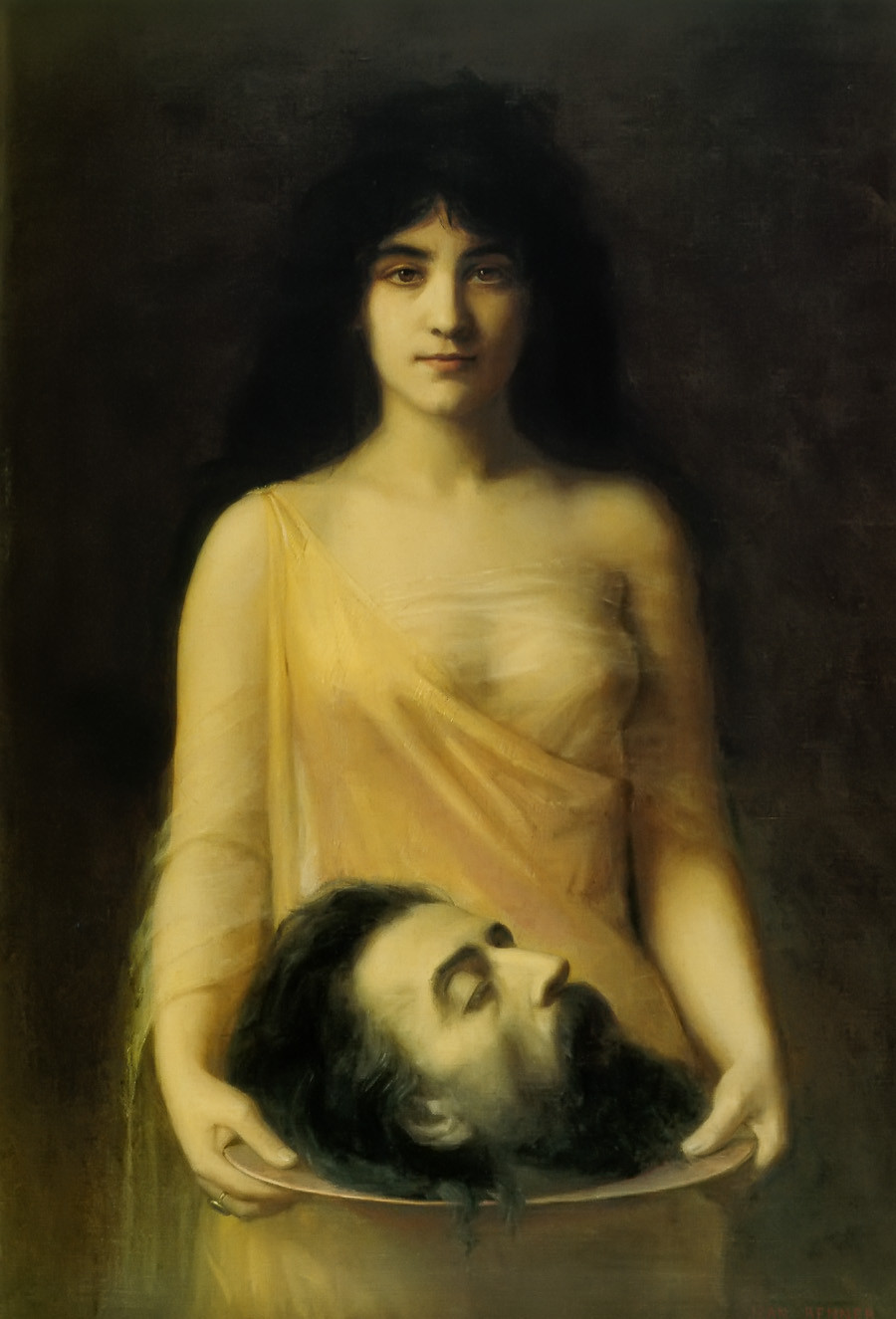
- Salome by Jean Benner, one of the two paintings used as a logo
- Artist: Gustav-Adolf Mossa
- Year: 1905
- Medium: Oil and gilt on canvas
- Dimensions: 80 cm × 63 cm (31 in × 25 in)
- Location: Musée des Beaux-Arts; Nice
- Website: geschlechterkampf.staedelmuseum.de/en/zoom/c1_mossa-gustav-adolf-elle.jpg

The exhibition Battle of the Sexes – Franz von Stuck to Frida Kahlo (Geschlechterkampf – Franz von Stuck bis Frida Kahlo) was held from 24 November 2016 to 19 March 2017 at the Städel-Museum in Frankfurt am Main. 140 paintings, films and sculptures reflected the change in gender roles and the perception of these roles.

As logo of the exhibition two paintings have been used: Salome by Jean Benner and Elle (She) by Gustav-Adolf Mossa, the depiction of a femme fatale with the blood of her male victims smeared on her thighs, sitting on a mountain of their corpses. Her genitalia are hidden by a cat. An inscription reads: hoc volo, sic iubeo; sit pro ratione voluntas.

On display were drawings, photographs, films, sculptures and paintings.

== Films ==
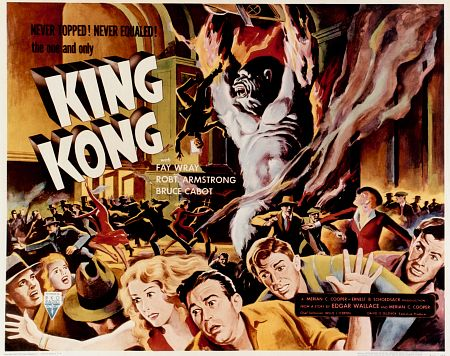
King Kong

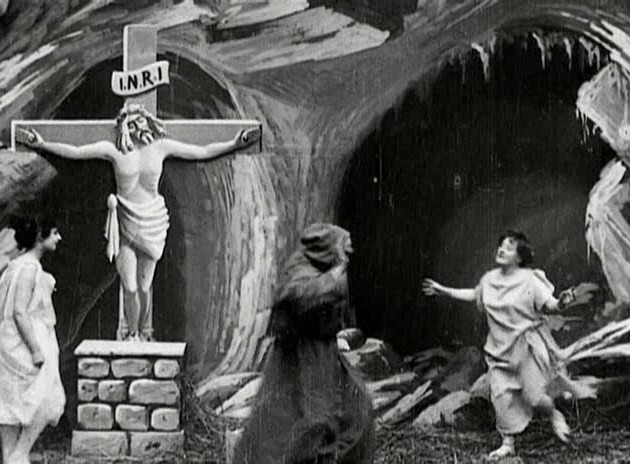
Die Versuchung des St. Antoine

The Kiss

Films shown in the exhibition were mostly from the Pre-Code-era.

== Sculptures ==
There were other versions or castings of these sculptures present:

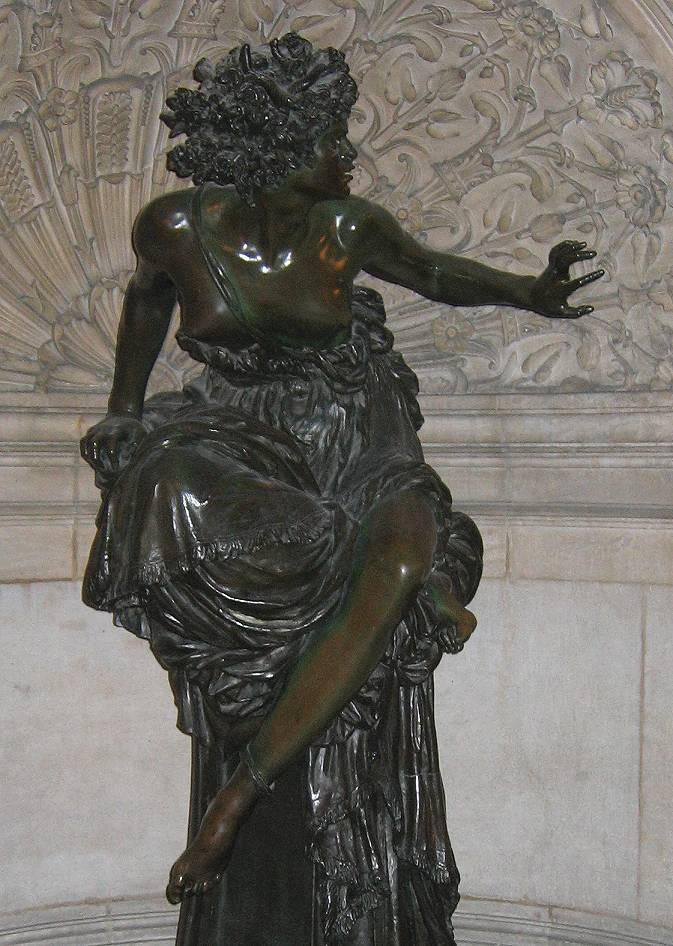
Phytia, Marcello

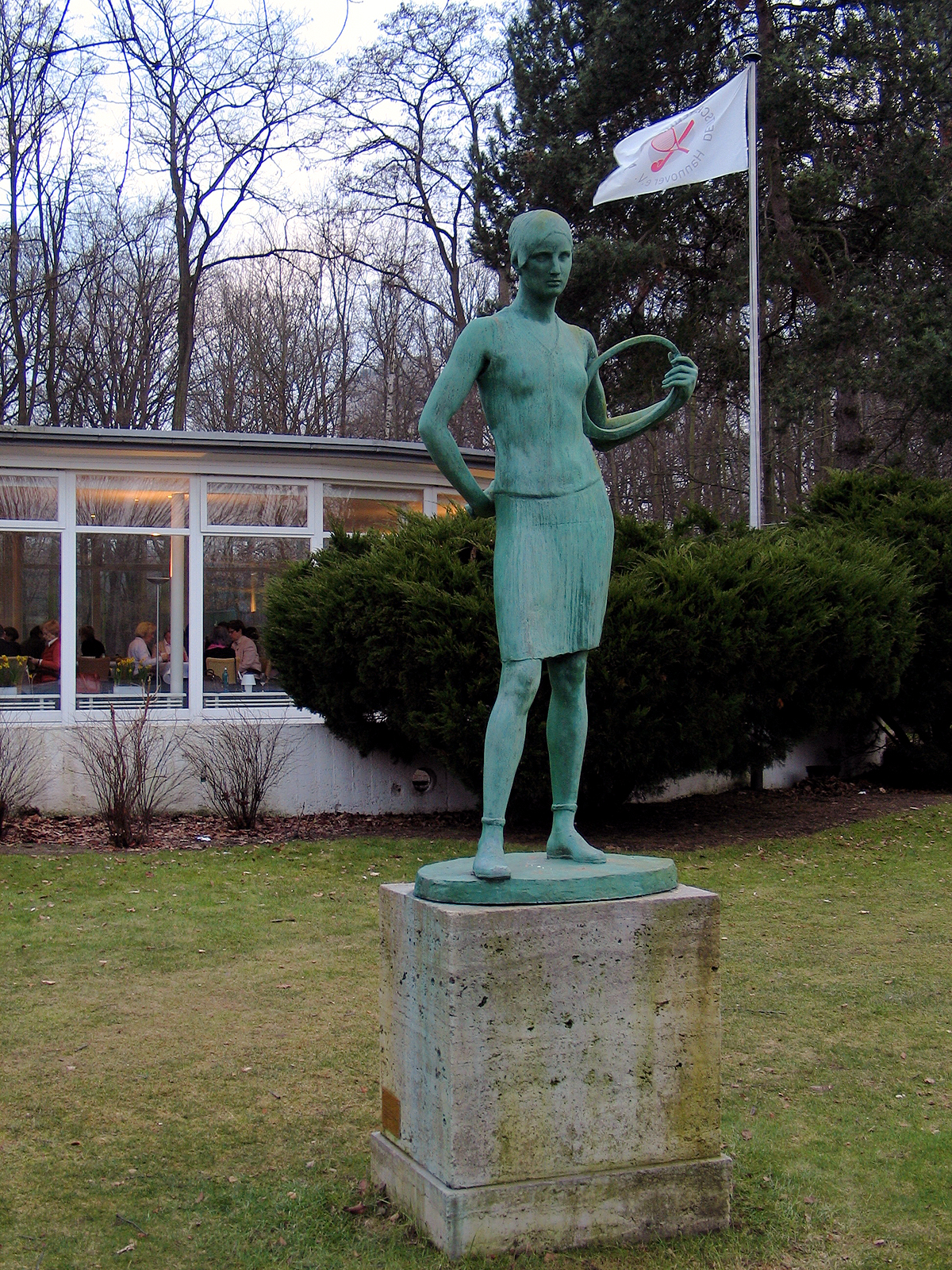
Tennisspielerin (tennis player), Constantin Starck

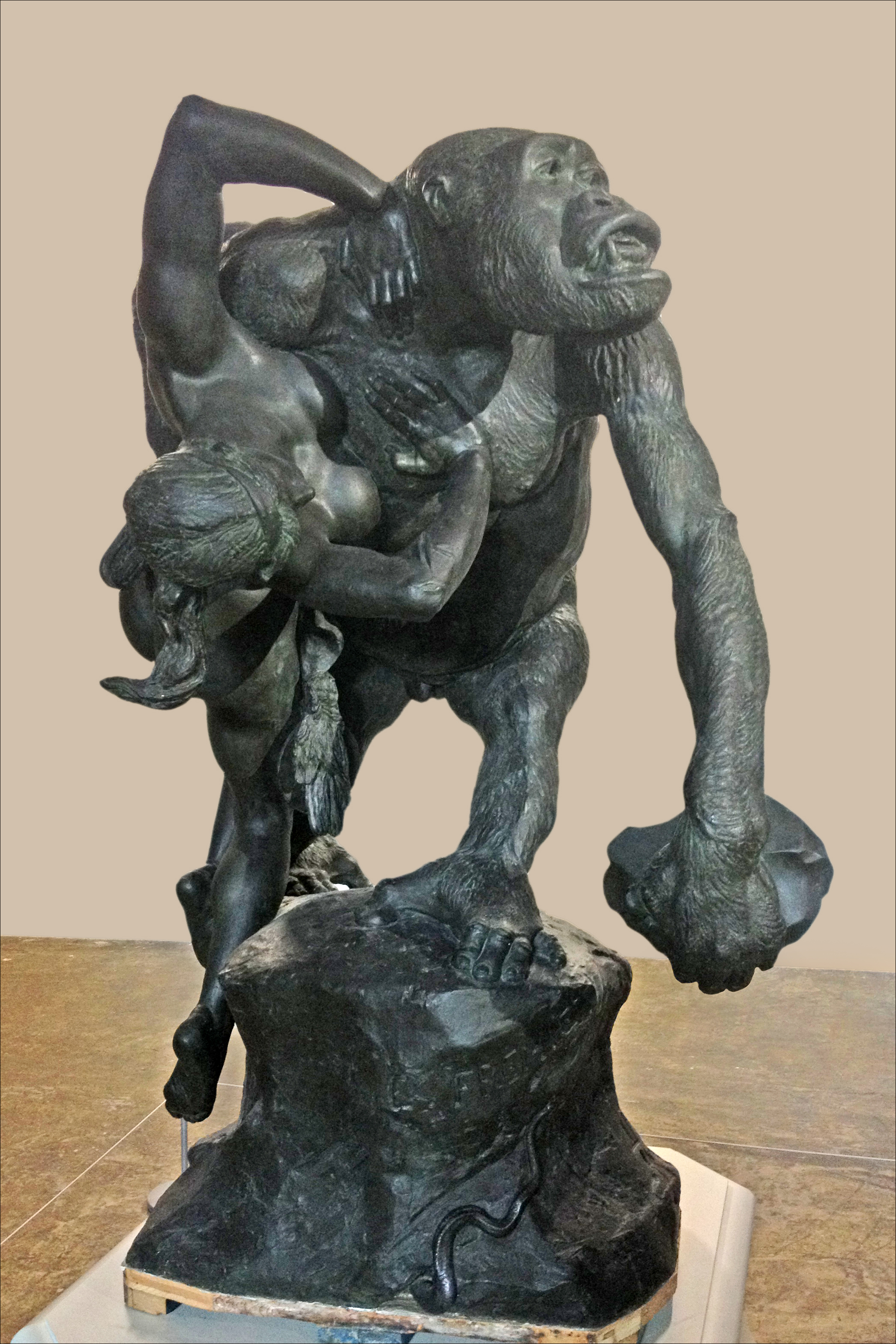
Gorille enlevant une femme, Jean-Pierre Dalbéra

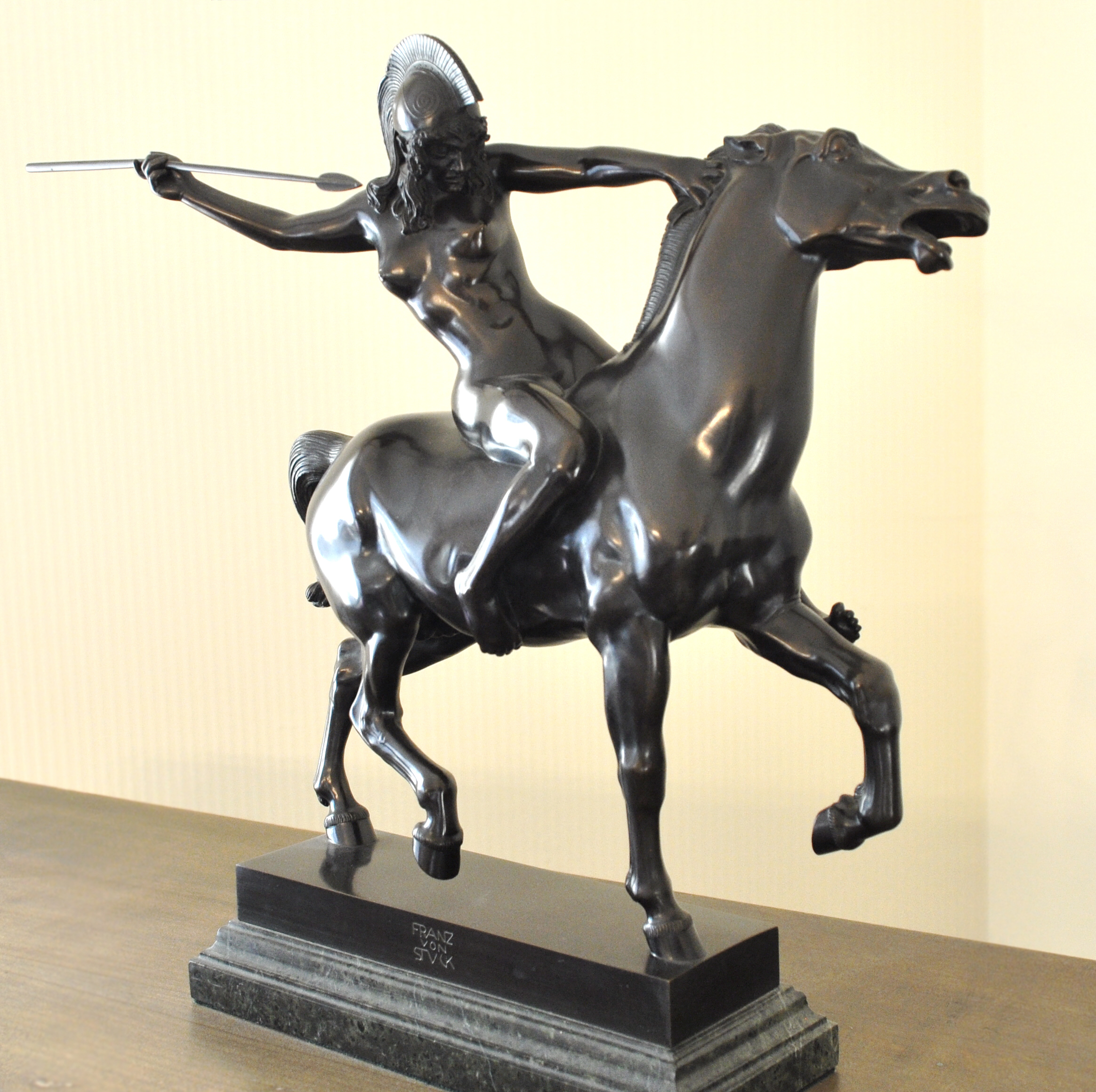
Amazone, Franz von Stuck

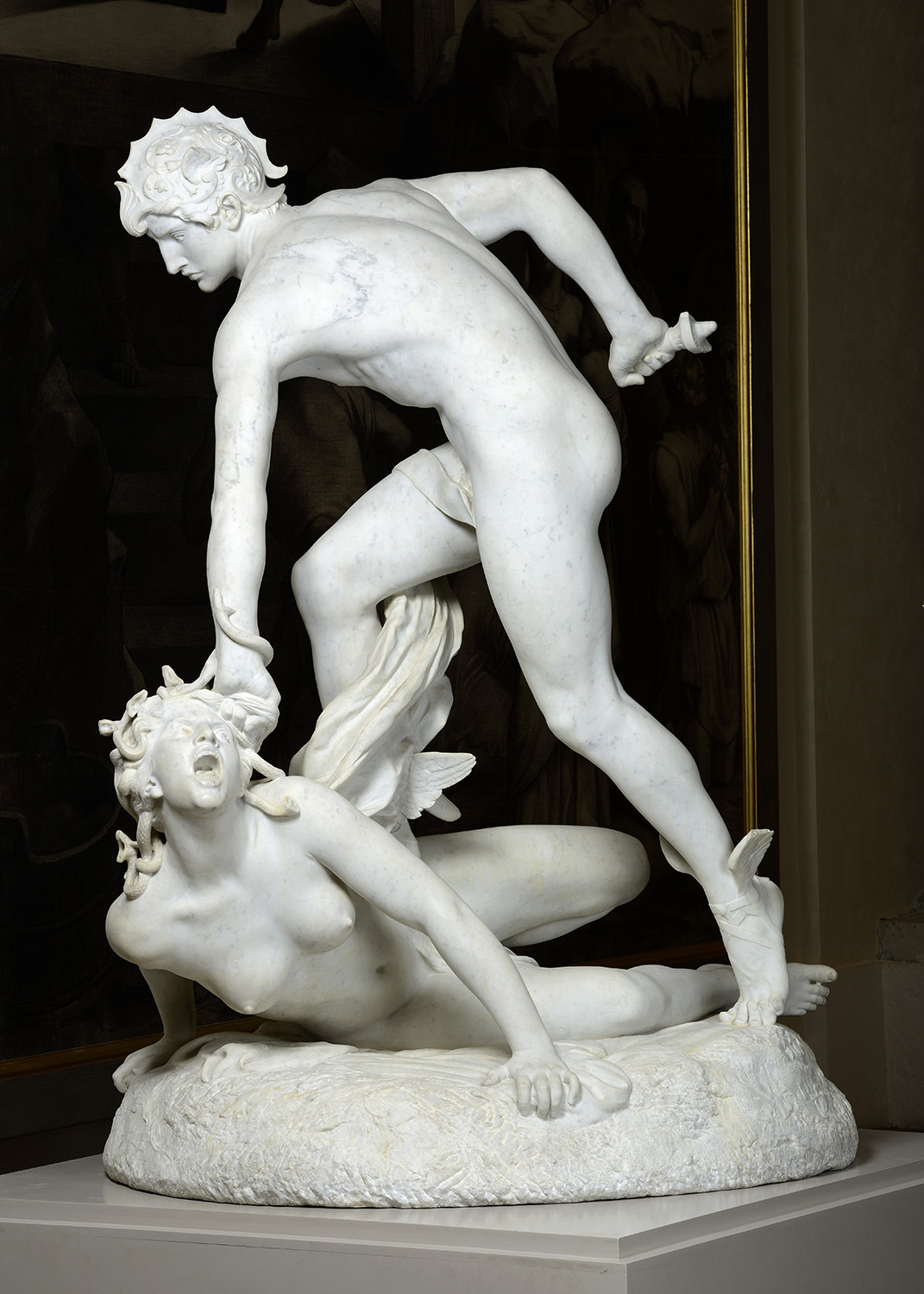
Persée et la gorgone, Laurent-Honoré Marqueste

Marcello's sculpture Pythia is a representation of the priest of the oracle of Delphi, who made her prophecies under the influence of hallucinogenic gas. They were then interpreted by male priests. Well known is the prediction to the people of Athens to use wooden walls as a means to defeat the Persians. This was taken as advice to build triremes. The Persian fleet was defeated in the Battle of Salamis. On display is one of many castings of this main work of Marcello. The male pseudonym was used by the countess Adélaïde Nathalie Marie Hedwige Philippine d’Affry, who could not benefit from an education at the PAFA where Eakins allowed women to study the nude. Therefore, she used castings of her own body in creating the sculpture.

The tennis player was able to engage in this sport as rules on female clothing had by the time been relaxed.

== Paintings ==
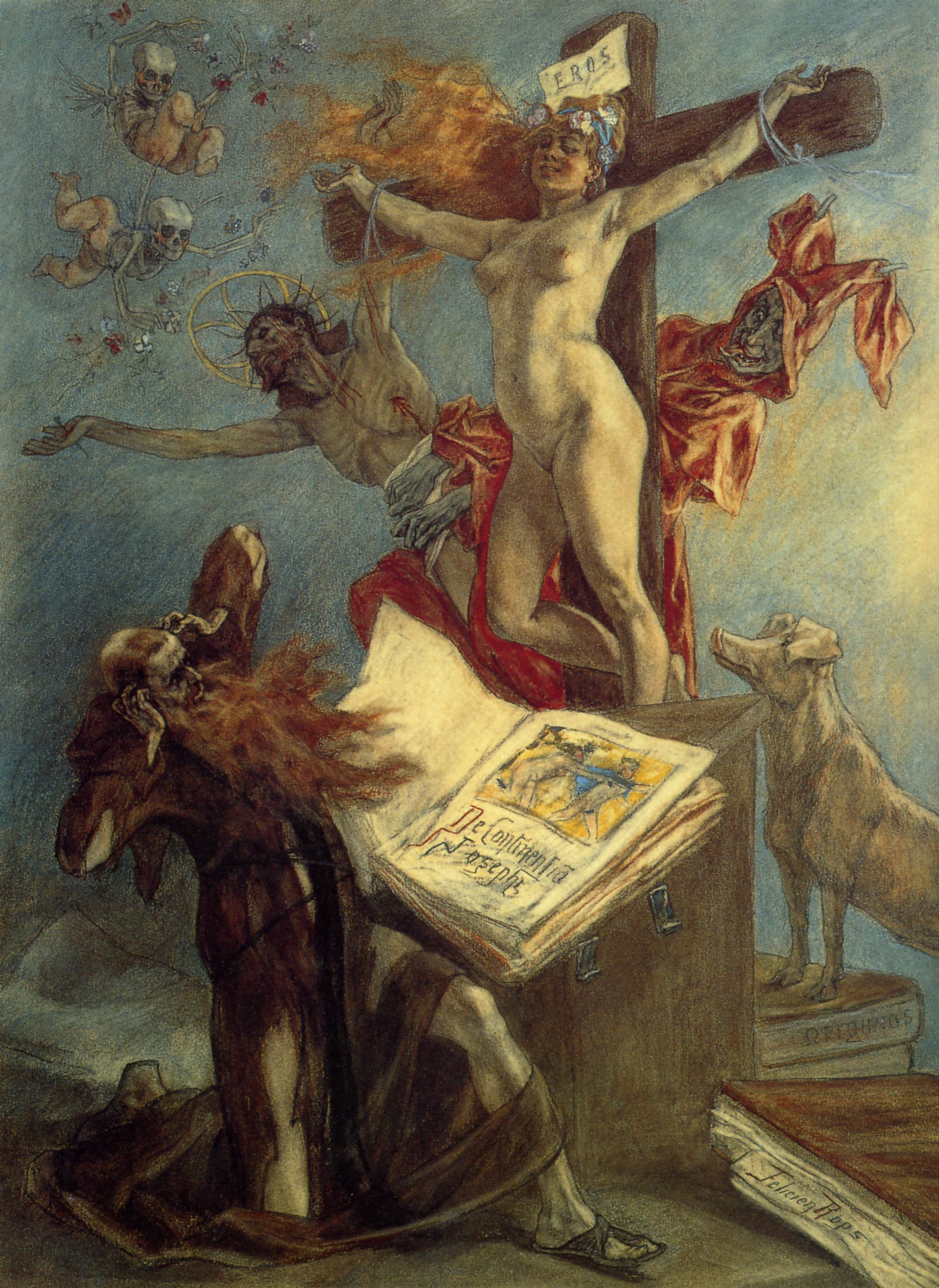
La tentation de Saint Antoine, Felicien Rops

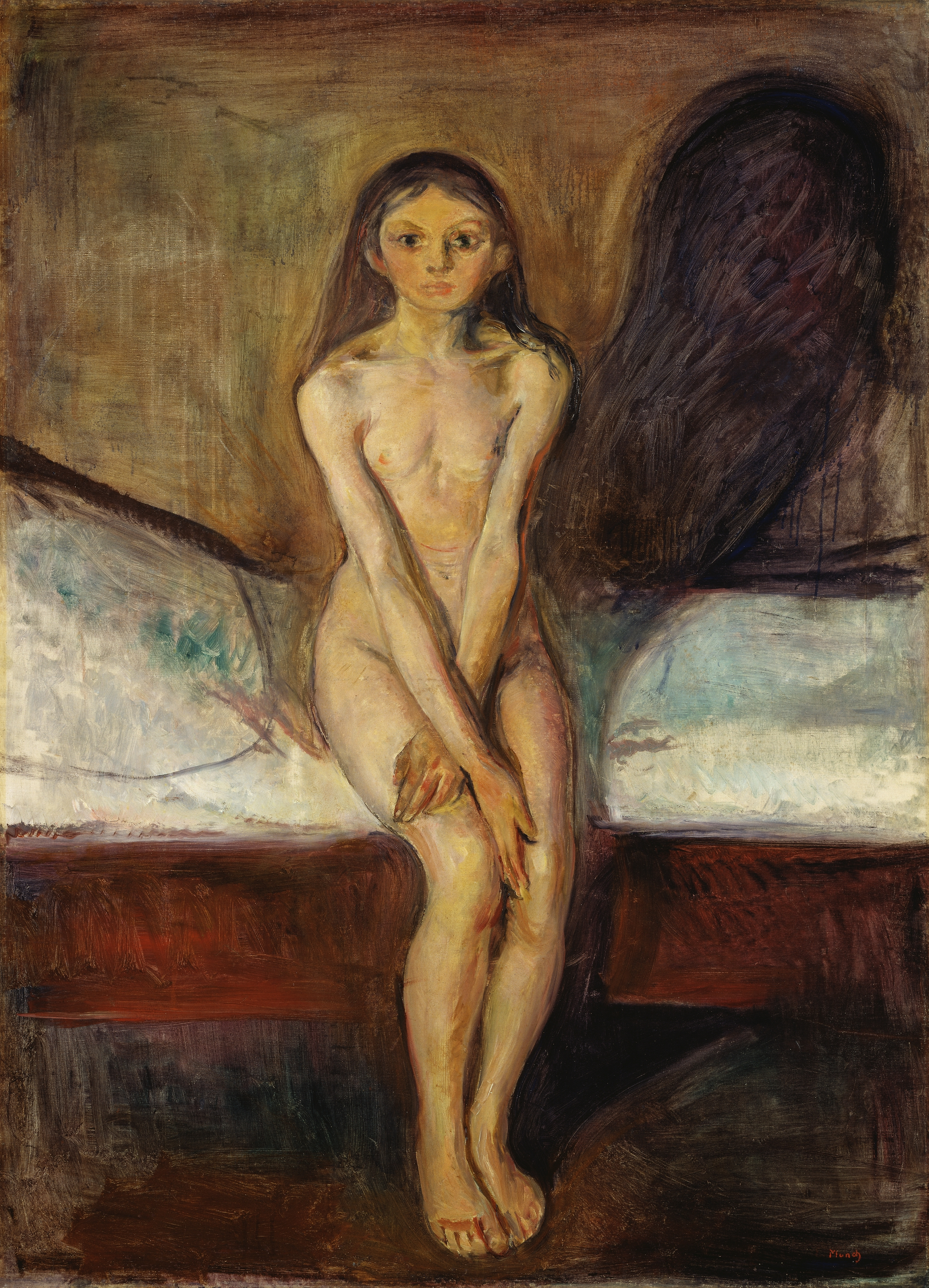
Puberty, Edvard Munch

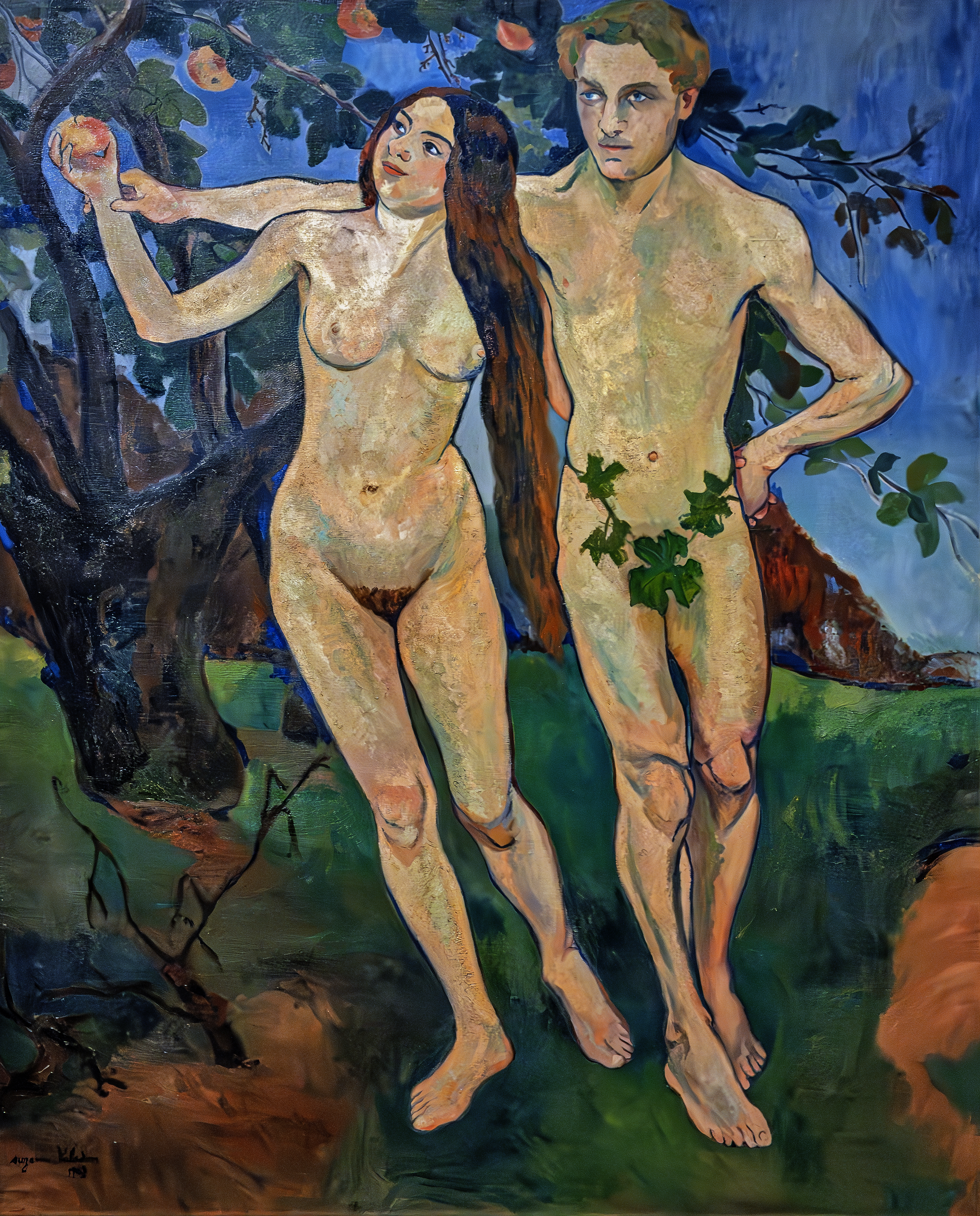
Adam and Eve, Suzanne Valadon

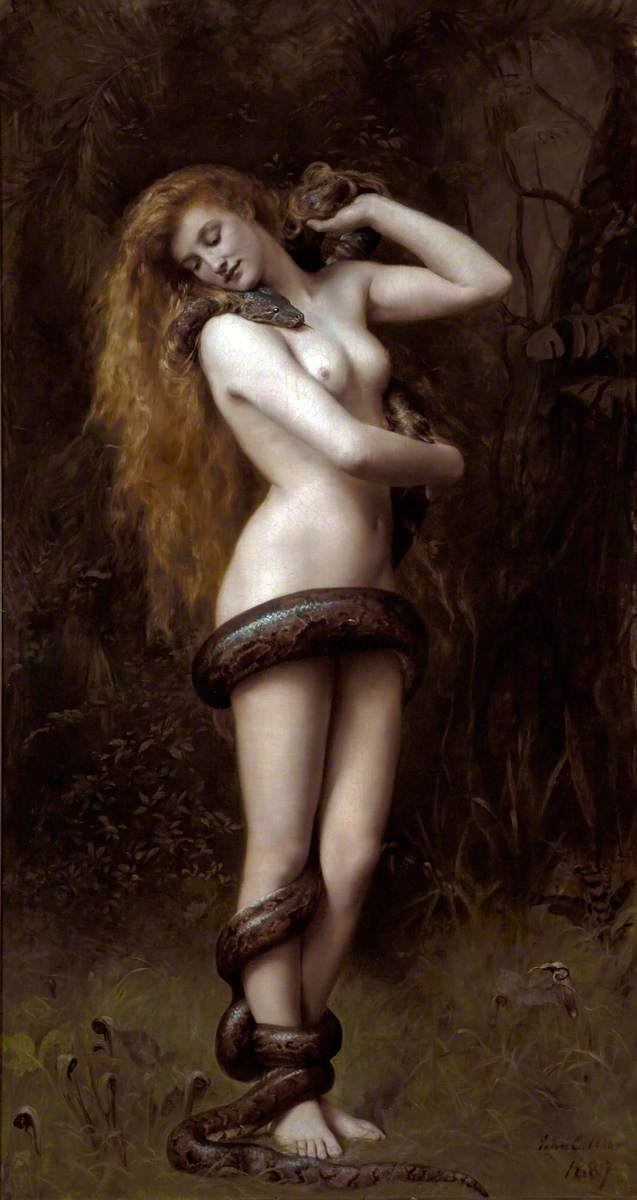
Lilith, John Collier

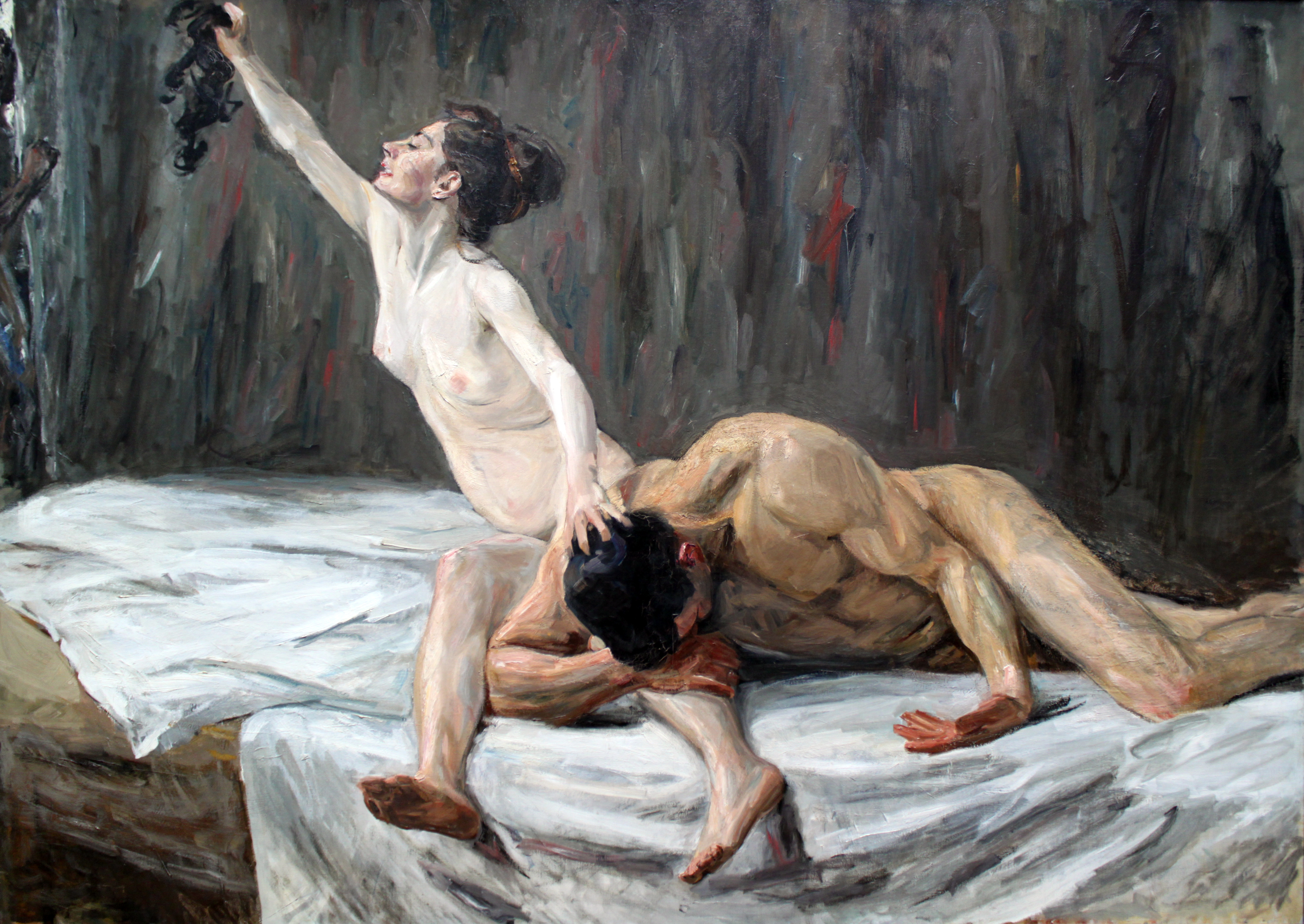
Simson and Delia, Max Liebermann

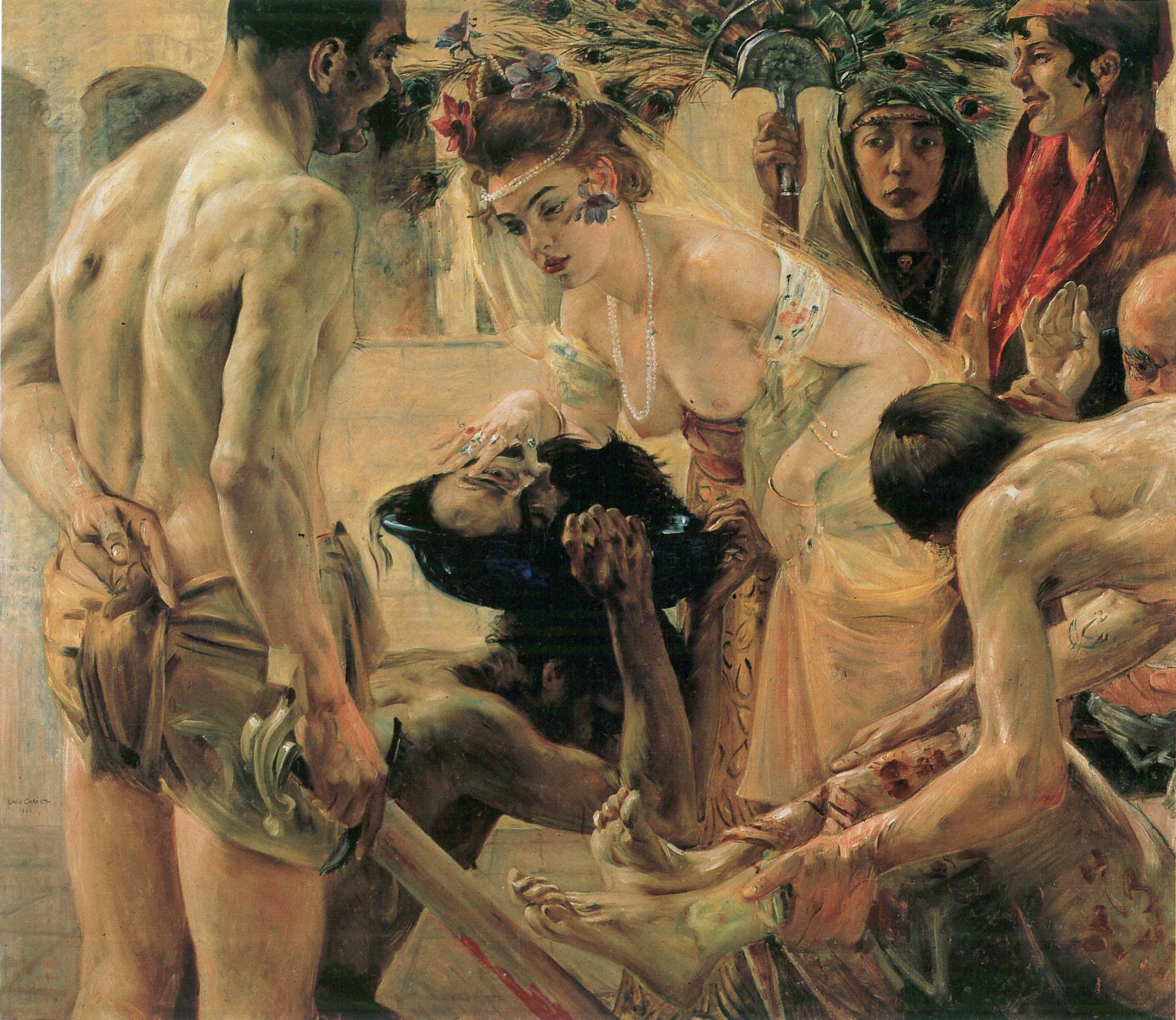
Salome II, Lovis Corinth

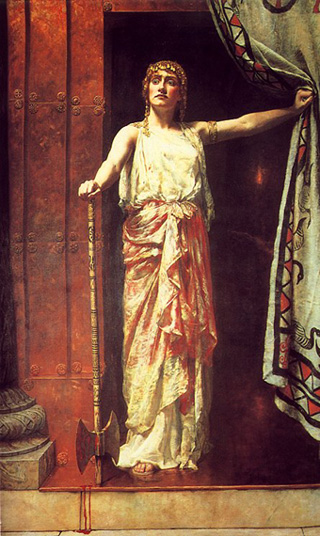
Clytemnestra

Suzanne Valadon modeled herself as Eve. Adam is a portrait of her muse, her twenty years younger lover. Both grab together for the forbidden fruit. Lilith was Adam's first wife and had to be replaced by Eve, when she showed her open hair in public and also fell otherwise out of the female role model.

Clytemnestra is holding the sword she used to kill her husband, after he was willing to sacrifice their daughter Iphigenia to Artemis.

Franz von Stuck, Edvard Munch, Otto Dix and Frida Kahlo are all represented by a number of paintings.

Meret Oppenheim's My Nurse is part of the exhibition.

== Perception ==
Art used the exhibition as a cover story with the headlines "Leider geil!", "Lustmord-Bilder sind der Höhepunkt des Frauenhasses" and "Der groteske US-Wahlkampf war der totale Geschlechterkampf". Kunstzeitung speaks of a parade full of facets, spanning a hundred years. Handelsblatt sees a contrast between first rate works and sultry perfumed paintings from the second tier. Schwäbische Zeitung describes the fighting scenes as a traditional costume parade at a town festival. Frankfurter Allgemeine Zeitung comments on the timing of the exhibition at the 2017 inauguration of Donald Trump.

== Literature ==
- Battle of the sexes: Franz von Stuck to Frida Kahlo, Felix Krämer, Cynthia Hall, Städel Museum, Prestel-Verlag, München, London, New York, 2016
- Geschlechterkampf: Franz von Stuck bis Frida Kahlo, Felix Krämer, Städel, Prestel, München, Frankfurt, 2016
- Geschlechterkampf, Brochure of the Städel-Museum, available at the Museumshop
