= Jacqueline Risset =

French poet

Jacqueline Risset was a French poet noted for her work on the board of the literary journal Tel Quel along with Julia Kristeva and Philippe Sollers, and for her translations of Italian poetry into French. Risset's books include Sleep's Powers and The Translation Begins.

Risset was born in Besançon in 1936, and died in Rome on 4 September 2014.

She taught French literature at the University La Sapienza in Rome.

Jennifer Moxley's translation of Sleep's Powers was published by Ugly Duckling Presse in 2008.
