= Battle of the Sexes =

Battle of the Sexes refers to a conflict between men and women.

Battle of the Sexes may also refer to:

== Film ==
- The Battle of the Sexes (1914 film), American film directed by D. W. Griffith
- Battle of the Sexes (1920 film), a 1920 German silent film
- Battle of the Sexes (1926 film), a 1926 German silent comedy film
- The Battle of the Sexes (1928 film), American remake of 1914 film
- The Battle of the Sexes (1959 film), British comedy starring Peter Sellers
- Battle of the Sexes (2017 film), a 2017 biopic on the tennis encounter between Billie Jean King and Bobby Riggs

== Radio and television ==
- Battle of the Sexes (radio contest), a radio contest, TV show and board game
- Real World/Road Rules Challenge: Battle of the Sexes, an MTV competitive reality television show
- Real World/Road Rules Challenge: Battle of the Sexes 2, a sequel
- Battle of the Sexes, the subtitle for the season 2 premiere episode for the NBC's game show 1 vs. 100, aired January 4, 2008

== Music ==
- Battle of the Sexes (album), a 2010 album by American rapper Ludacris
- "Battle of the Sexes", a single by Faith Hope & Charity
- "The Battle of the Sexes", a song by Tom Paxton from Redemption Road, 2015

== Sport ==
- Battle of the Sexes (tennis), a 1973 exhibition tennis match between Billie Jean King and Bobby Riggs.
- Jordan Mixed Open, a 2019 tri-sanctioned golf tournament that is a more modern-day interpretation of the same ideal.
- Royal Poinciana Invitational, a 1962-63 pro golf event that was an early predecessor of the "Battle of the Sexes" concept in sport
- In curling, there have been several "Battle of the Sexes", including a 2025 skins game between Bruce Mouat and Rachel Homan and a 1986 game between Ed Werenich and Marilyn Darte.

== Art ==
- Geschlechterkampf (Battle of the Sexes – Franz von Stuck to Frida Kahlo), an art exhibition about gender roles
- Battle of the Sexes (illustration), a lost James Thurber illustration drawn on the wall of Costello's, a former Irish bar and restaurant in New York City

== Science ==
- Battle of the sexes (game theory), a game studied by game theorists
