= Pierre Alféri =

French writer (1963–2023)

Pierre Alferi
- Born: Pierre Jérôme Derrida; 10 April 1963; Paris, France
- Died: 16 August 2023 (aged 60); Paris, France
- Education: École Normale Supérieure
- Occupations: Poet; essayist; novelist; academic
- Parent(s): Jacques Derrida; Marguerite Aucouturier

Pierre Alferi (French: [pjɛʁ alfeʁi]; born Pierre Jérôme Derrida; 10 April 1963 – 16 August 2023) was a French novelist, poet, and essayist. Alferi was the son of the French philosopher Jacques Derrida and psychoanalyst Marguerite Aucouturier.

Alferi was published as Pierre Alféri early in his career.

== Biography ==
Pierre Alferi was born in Paris on 10 April 1963 to philosopher Jacques Derrida and psychoanalyst Marguerite Derrida. He was of Algerian-Jewish descent through his father, and Czech descent through his mother. He tried to remain discreet about his ancestry, namely his famous philosopher father Derrida, by adopting his maternal grandmother's name for public life.

Alferi suffered from cancer and died in Paris on 16 August 2023, at the age of 60.

== Career ==
Alferi studied at the École Normale Supérieure and completed his agrégation. After his doctoral dissertation on William of Ockham, supervised by Louis Marin, Alferi began to primarily write poetry. Alferi was also a literary translator who has translated works by John Donne, Giorgio Agamben and Meyer Schapiro from English and Russian into French. He had also written songs for several performing artists including Jeanne Balibar. Between 1991 and 1992, Alferi was writer-in-residence at the Fondation Royaumont, and at the French Academy in Rome between 1987 and 1988.

Alferi was co-founder (with Suzanne Doppelt), of the literary journal Détail, and La Revue de Littérature Générale (with Olivier Cadiot). Alferi taught at the École nationale supérieure des beaux-arts in Paris, the École nationale supérieure des arts décoratifs in Paris, and the European Graduate School. His work is considered singular and unclassifiable as it includes poetry, drawing, music, novel and philosophy. Alferi was also a translator of poetry and philosophy including the work of Giorgio Agamben.

== Publications ==
Poetry

- Les Allures naturelles POL, Paris, 1991 ISBN 2-86744-218-4
- Le Chemin familier du poisson combatif, POL, Paris, 1992 ISBN 2-86744-308-3
- Kub Or, POL, Paris, 1994 ISBN 2-86744-411-X
- Sentimentale journée, POL, Paris, 1997 ISBN 2-86744-557-4
- Personal Pong (avec Jacques Julien), Villa Saint-Clair, Sète, 1997
- Handicap (avec Jacques Julien), Rroz, 2000
- petit, petit, Rup et rud, 2001
- La Voie des airs, POL, Paris, 2004 ISBN 2-86744-993-6
- OXO (photos by Suzanne Doppelt, trans. by Cole Swensen), Burning Deck, Providence, 2004 ISBN 1-886224-66-8
- Writing the Real: A Bilingual Anthology of Contemporary French Poetry (translated by Kate Lermitte Campbell), 2016. Enitharmon Press

Novels

- Fmn, POL, Paris, 1994 ISBN 2-86744-440-3
- Le Cinéma des familles, POL, Paris, 1999 ISBN 2-86744-713-5
- Les Jumelles, POL, Paris, 2009 ISBN 978-2-84682-309-8
- Après vous, POL, Paris, 2010 ISBN 978-2-8180-0009-0

Essays

- Guillaume d'Ockham le singulier, Minuit, coll. « Philosophie », Paris, 1989 ISBN 2-7073-1200-2
- Chercher une phrase, Christian Bourgois, coll. « Détroits », Paris, 1991 ISBN 2-267-01025-9
- Des enfants et des monstres, POL, Paris, 2004 ISBN 2-86744-992-8

Art

- Ca Commence à Séoul, DVD video. Pierre Alféri and Jacques Julien, Le Label Dernière Bande and Éditions P.O.L. 2007
- L'inconnu, Pierre Alféri and Jacques Julien, le Quartier - Centre d'art contemporain de Quimper. 2004
