= Olivier Cadiot =

French writer, poet, dramatist and translator

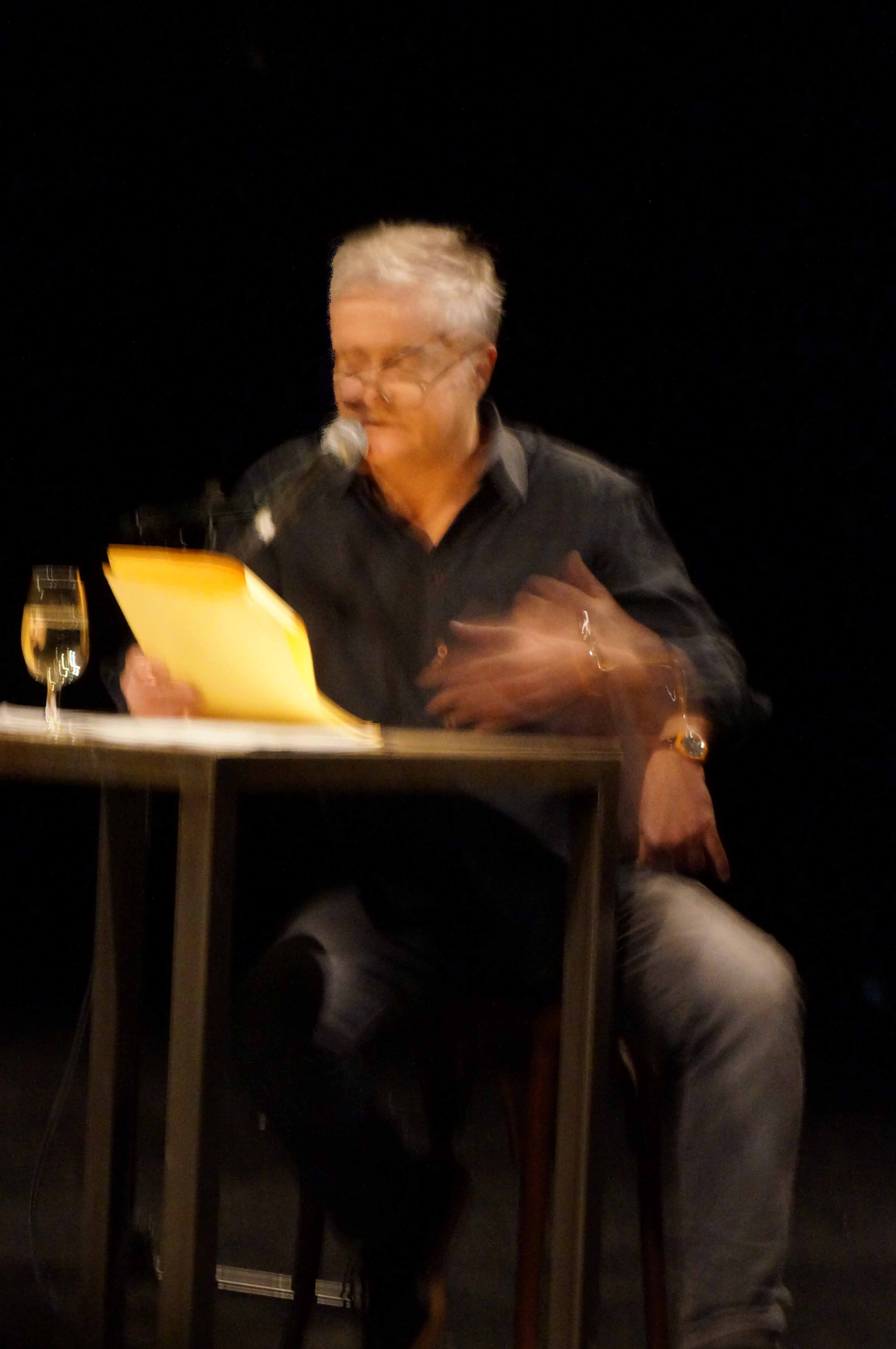
- Olivier Cadiot in 2013
- Born: 1956 (age 69–70); Paris
- Occupations: writer, poet and translator

Olivier Cadiot (French: [ɔlivje kadjo]; born 1956) is a French writer, poet, dramatist and translator.

Cadiot was born in Paris. His first book of poems, L'Art poetic, in which he used the cut-up technique, was published in 1988. In 1993, Cadiot published Futur, ancient, fugitive, and in 1997 he published Le Colonel des zouaves. In these books he proposed novels as poems. In 1995 and 1996 he coedited the Revue de Littérature générale with Pierre Alféri.

== Biography ==
From his first works published by P.O.L. to writing for the theater with Ludovic Lagarde, opera librettos for Pascal Dusapin and translations of biblical texts (Book of Hosea, Psalms, Song of Songs) and Gertrude Stein.

For a number of years, he has been passing on his own texts in readings at national drama centers and the Théâtre national de la Colline. His writing is strongly influenced by the literary avant-gardes of the 20th century: Gertrude Stein, James Joyce, William S. Burroughs, among others.Like many writers of his generation, he was influenced by Roland Barthes seminars. His first aesthetic shock came when he read Stéphane Mallarmé poem Pour un Tombeau d'Anatole. In his writing, he demonstrates a constant concern for formal invention, with cuts, breaks and simultaneities. Yet his aim is always to “make complicated things simple”.

In 1993, with Pierre Alféri, he founded the Revue de littérature générale, which produced two opuses. He has released three albums with guitarist and singer Rodolphe Burger. He has released three albums with guitarist and singer Rodolphe Burger. In July 2010, he was named associate artist of the Festival d'Avignon alongside Christoph Marthaler.

== Works ==
- L'art poétic, POL, Paris, 1988 ISBN 2-86744-555-8
- Roméo & Juliette, POL, Paris, 1989 ISBN 2-86744-162-5
- Futur, ancien, fugitif, POL, Paris, 1993 ISBN 2-86744-305-9
- Le Colonel Des Zouaves, POL, Paris, 1997 ISBN 2-86744-550-7

== Bibliography ==
- Dictionnaire de la littérature française ISBN 978-4-255-00387-0 C0090
