= Jennifer Moxley =

American poet, editor, and translator (born 1964)

Jennifer Moxley (born 12 May 1964) is an American poet, editor, and translator (French) who was born in San Diego, California. She got her GED at 16, took college courses while working in her father's shop, spent a year as an au pair in Paris at age 18, and attended the University of California, San Diego. Her time at the university is detailed in her memoir, The Middle Room.

She teaches poetry and poetics at the University of Maine and resides in Orono, Maine with her partner, Steve Evans. She is working on an English translation of the poems and diaries of Quebecois poet Marie Uguay.

In 2015, Moxley's collection The Open Secret won the Poetry Society of America's William Carlos Williams Award. Her poems have been included in two anthologies of contemporary American verse published by W. W. Norton & Company.

== Work ==
=== Poetry ===
- Imagination Verses (New York: Tender Buttons, 1996) UK Edition (Cambridge: Salt, 2003)
- The Sense Record (Washington DC: Edge, 2002) UK Edition (Cambridge: Salt, 2003)
- Often Capital (Chicago: Flood, 2005)
- The Line (Sausalito: Post-Apollo, 2007)
- Clampdown (Chicago: Flood, 2009)
- Foyer States (Iowa City: Catenary, 2013)
- The Open Secret (Chicago: Flood Editions, 2014)
- Druthers (Chicago: Flood Editions, 2018)

=== Prose ===
- For the Good of All, Do Not Destroy the Birds: Essays (Chicago: Flood Editions, 2021)
- There Are Things We Live Among: Essays on the Object World. (Chicago: Flood Editions, 2012)
- The Middle Room (Berkeley, CA: subpress, 2007)

=== Editing ===
- The Poker (Somerville, MA), contributing editor, 2003 to present
- The Baffler (Chicago), poetry editor, 1997.
- The Impercipient Lecture Series (Providence), co-editor with Steve Evans, 1997
- The Impercipient (Providence), founder and editor 1992 to 1995

=== Translation ===
- Writing the Real: A Bilingual Anthology of Contemporary French Poetry (translated Anne Portugal), 2016. Enitharmon Press
- The Translation Begins by Jacqueline Risset (Providence: Burning Deck, 1996)
- Sleep's Powers by Jacqueline Risset (New York: Ugly Duckling Presse)

== Sources ==
- Jennifer Moxley at EPC
- "Jennifer Moxley at PennSound". PennSound.
