= Nice Carnival =

Annual carnival in France

Nice Carnival Carnaval de Nice
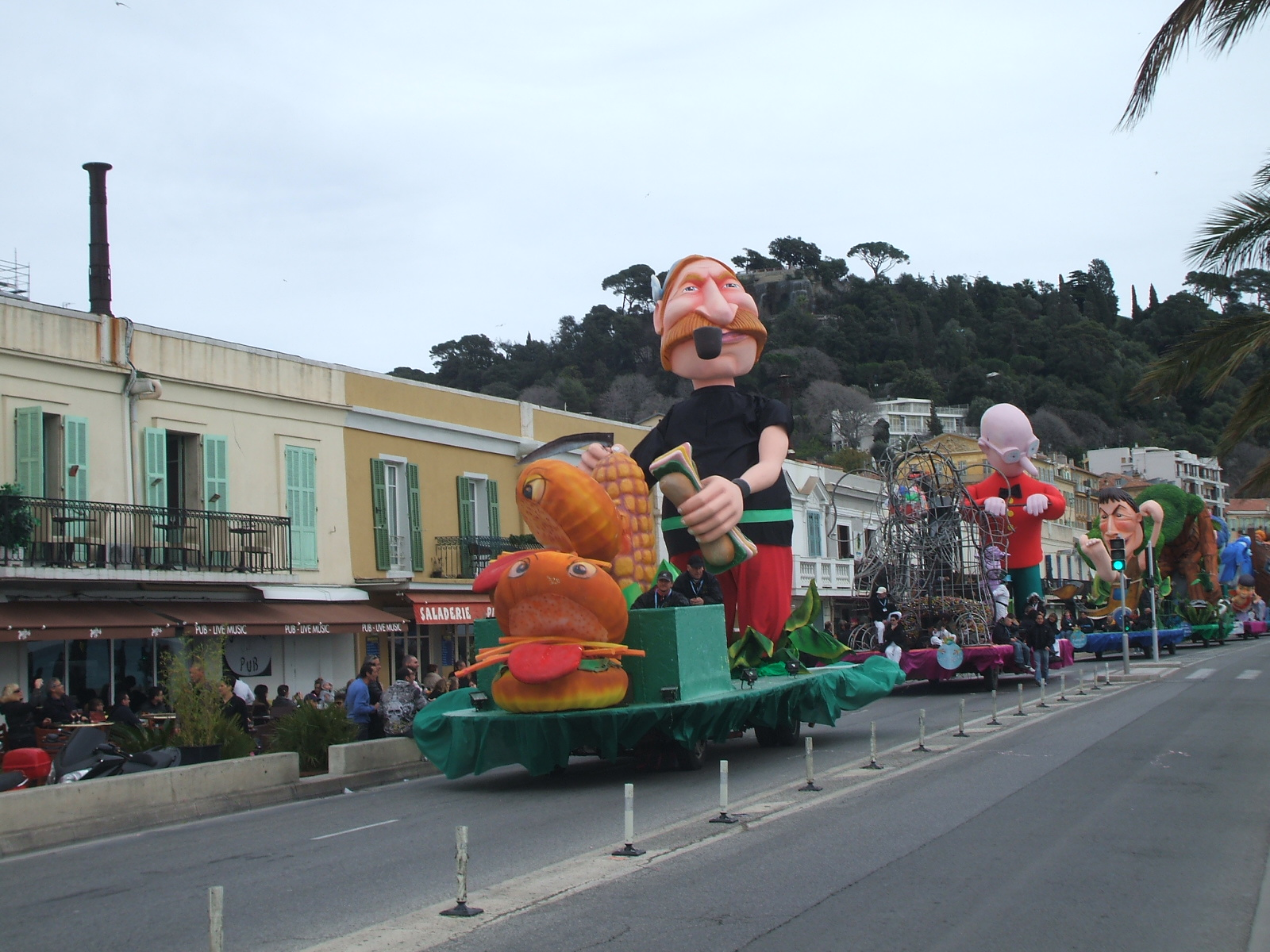
- Floats at the 2010 Nice Carnival
- Status: Active
- Genre: Carnival
- Date: February–March
- Begins: 15 February 2025
- Ends: 2 March 2025
- Frequency: Annual
- Location: Nice
- Coordinates: 43.7034°N 7.2663°E
- Country: France
- Inaugurated: 1294
- Most recent: 17 February–3 March 2024
- Website: nicecarnaval.com

The Nice Carnival (French: Carnaval de Nice) is one of the world's major carnival events, alongside the Brazilian Carnival, Venetian Carnival, and Mardi Gras in New Orleans. It is held annually in February and sometimes early March (depending on the movable date of Carnival in the Christian calendar) in Nice on the French Riviera.

== History ==
The earliest records establish the carnival's existence in 1294, when the Count of Provence, Charles Anjou, wrote that he had passed "the joyous days of carnival." This may make the Nice Carnival the original carnival celebration.

In 1873, a committee was created for the Carnival, headed by local artist Alexis Mossa, with later contributions from his son Gustav-Adolf Mossa. The Carnival was reinvented into a parade, adding masquerades, satirical floats, and competitions.

Today, the two-week event attracts over a million visitors to Nice every year.

Each year, a special theme is chosen, and artists create 18 floats and other figurines in traditional papier-mâché for the colorful parade. The parades take place day and night, while on the Promenade des Anglais, "flower battles" occur.

In 2017, the memorial to the 2016 Nice truck attack was dismantled in preparation for the carnival. Additionally, the route was moved from the Promenade des Anglais to the Promenade du Paillon.

== Gallery ==
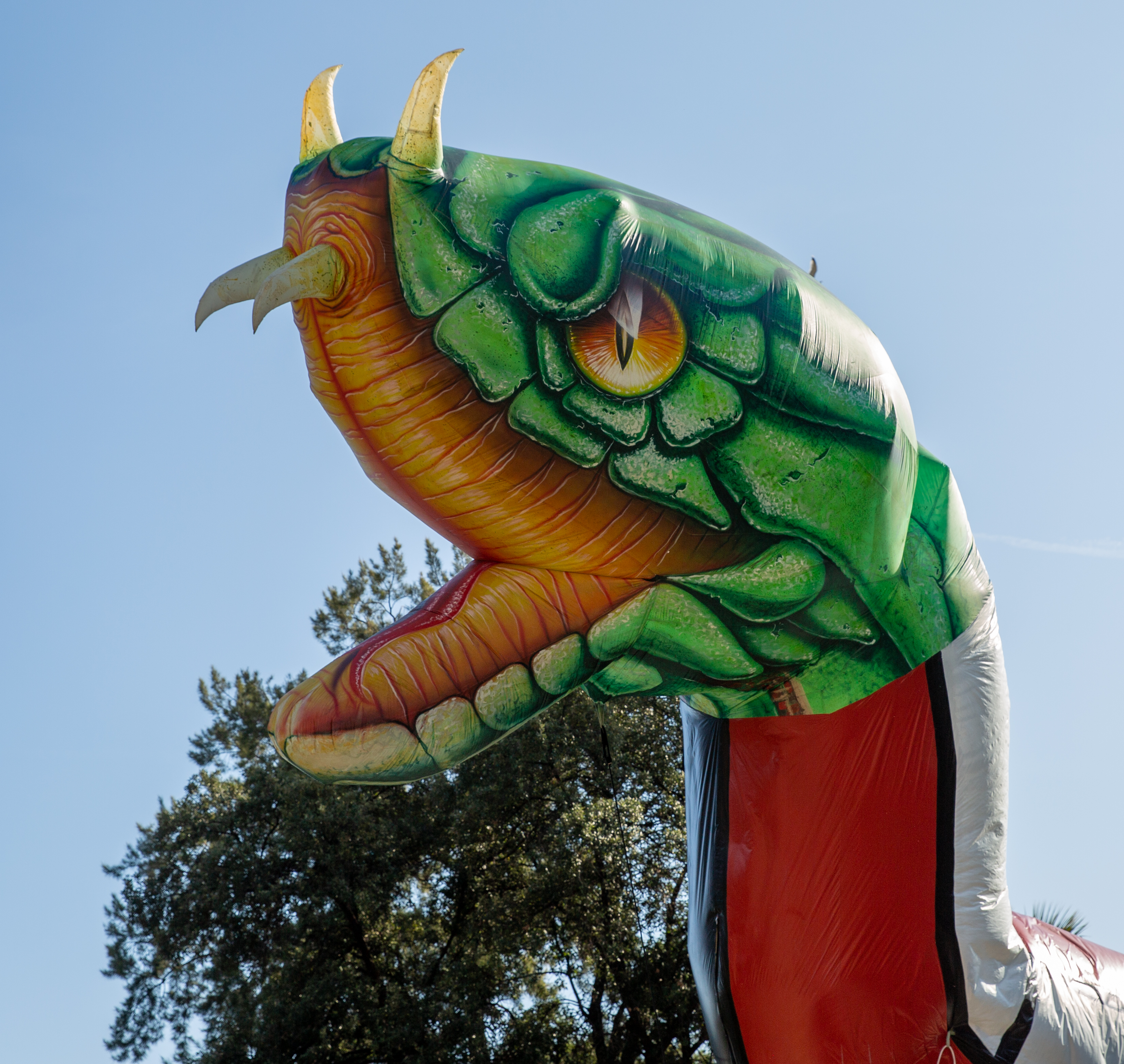
Nice Carnival 2020

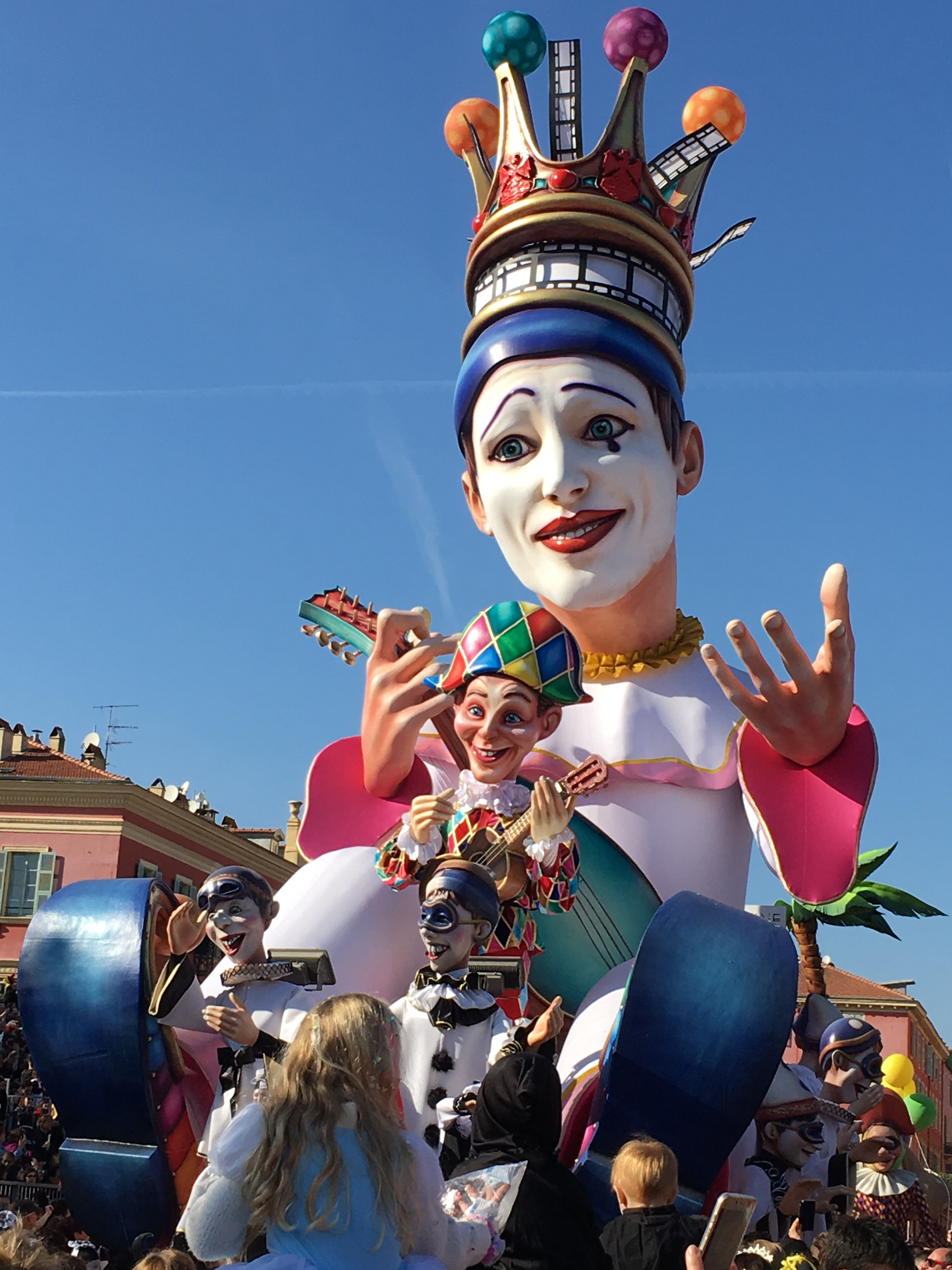
Nice Carnival 2019

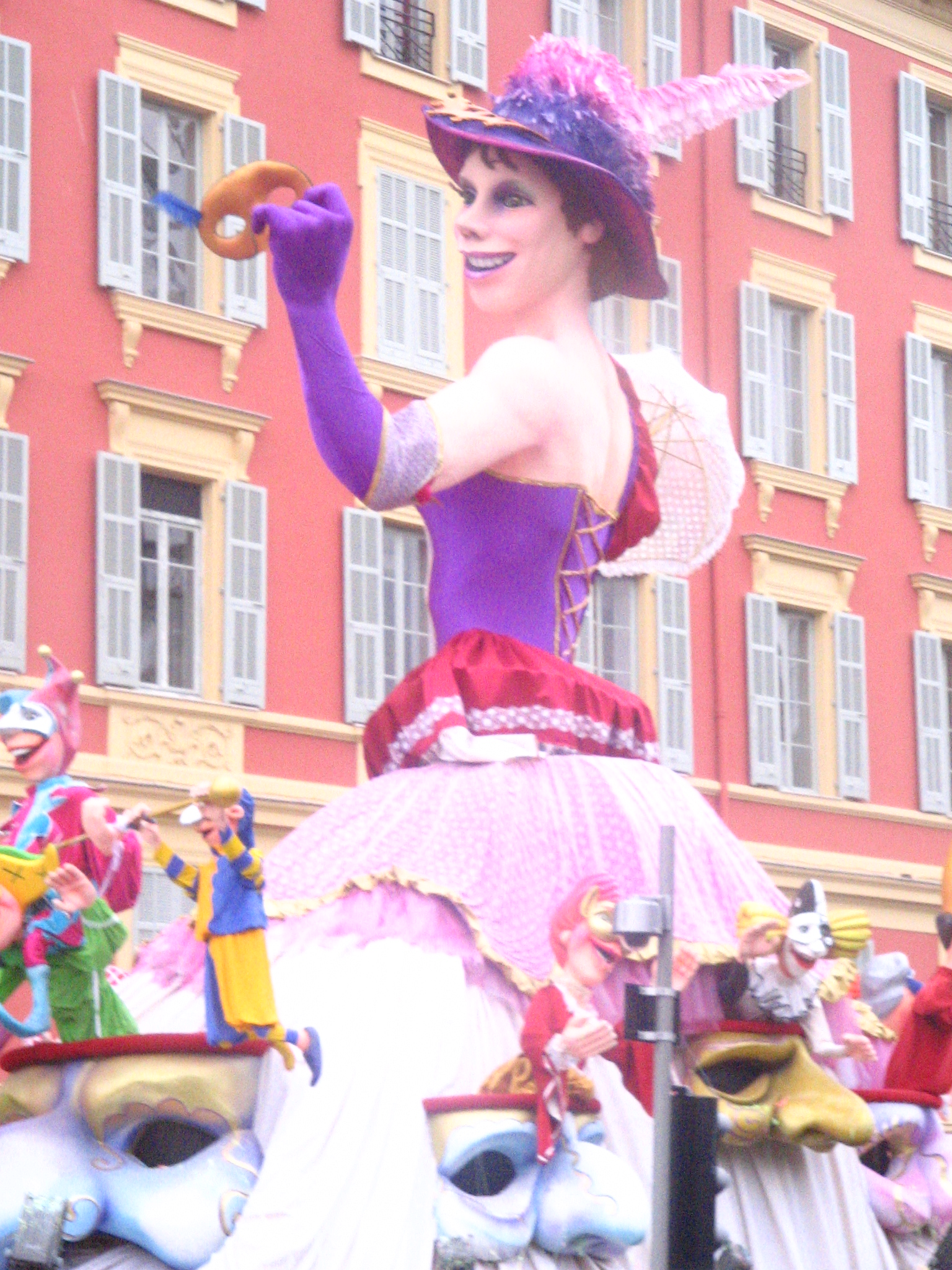
Nice Carnival 2009

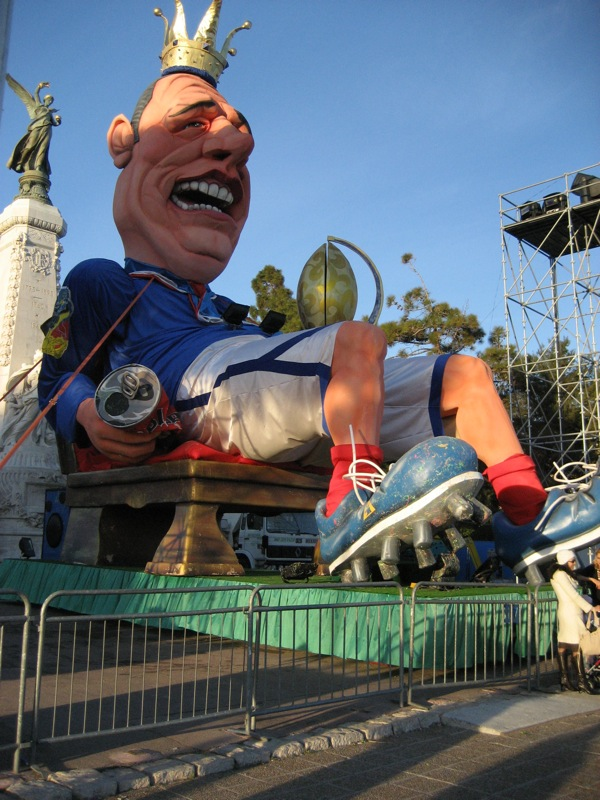
Nice Carnival 2007

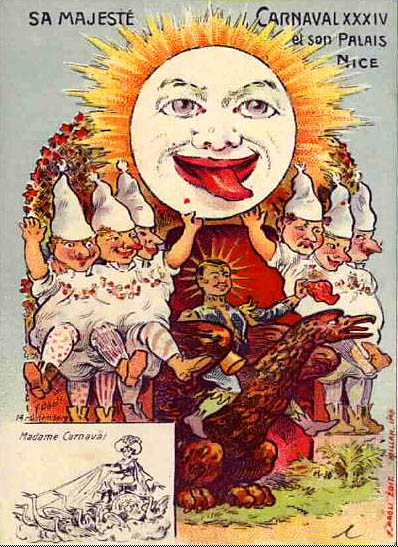
Nice Carnival 1916

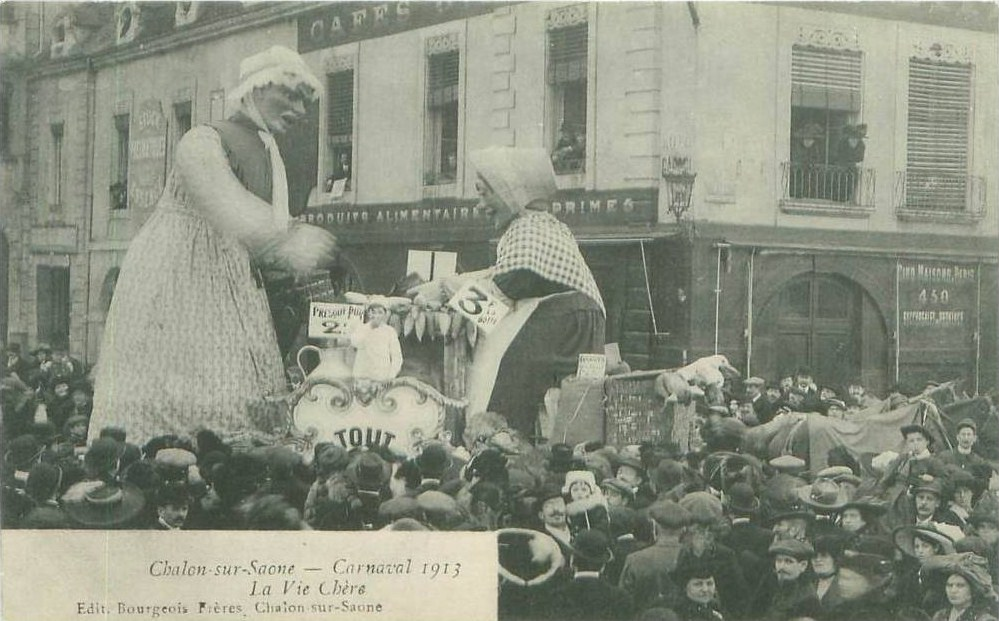
Nice Carnival 1913

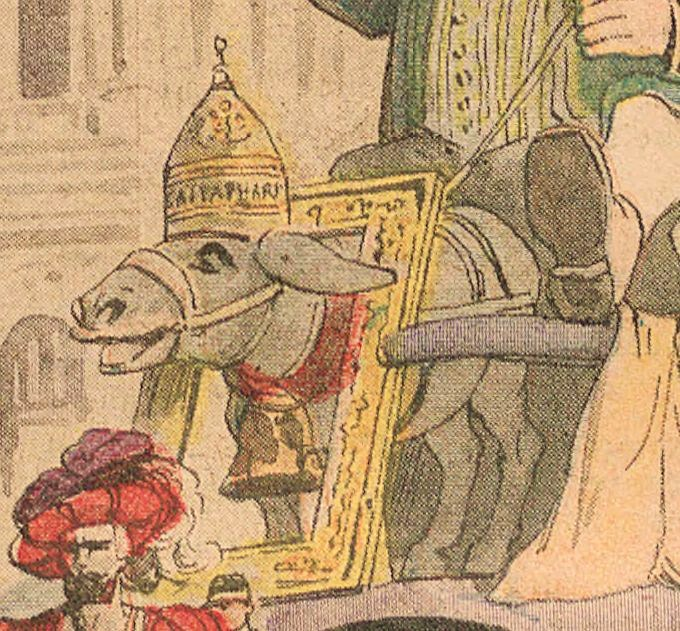
Nice Carnival 1912

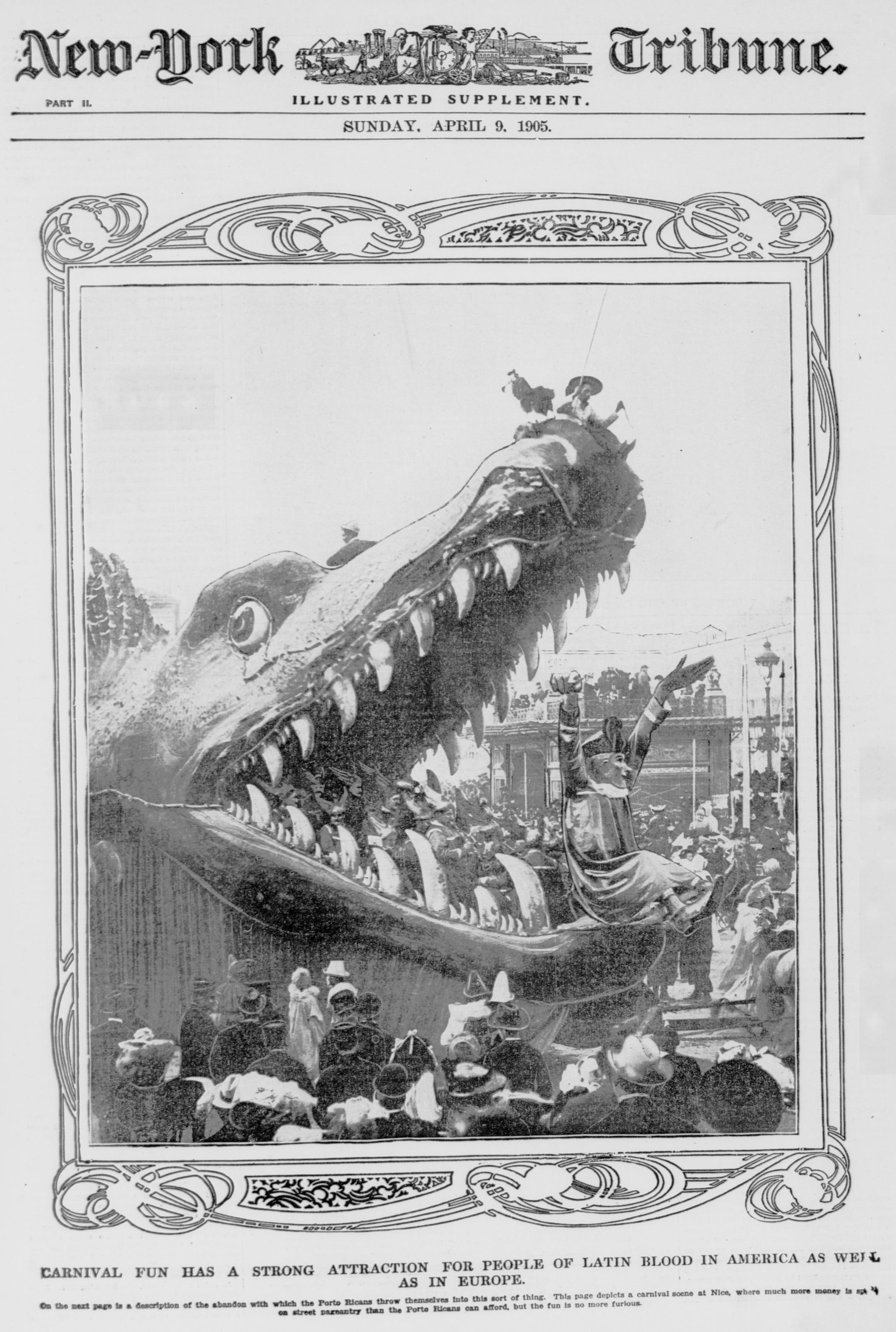
Nice Carnival 1905

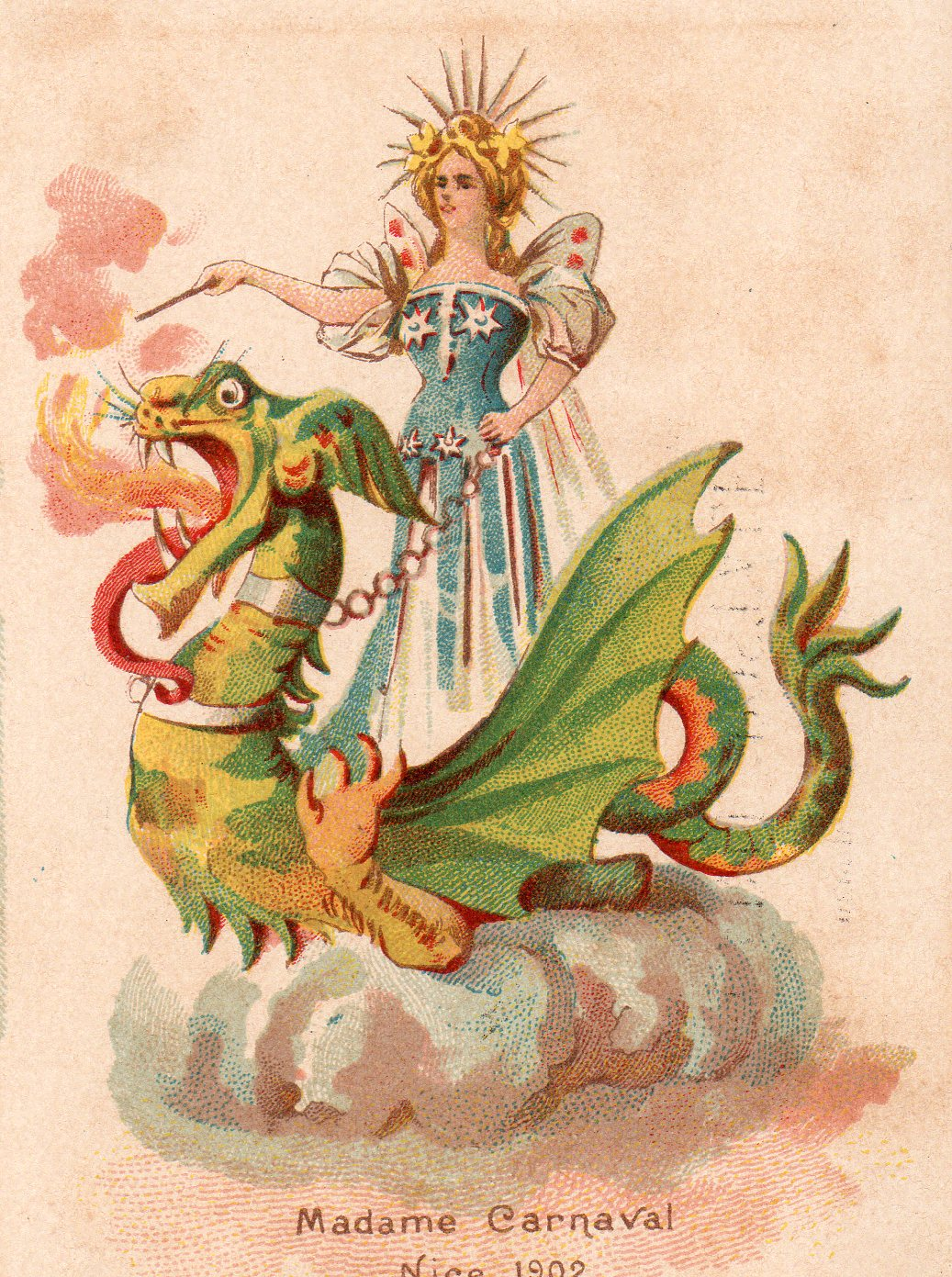
Nice Carnival 1902

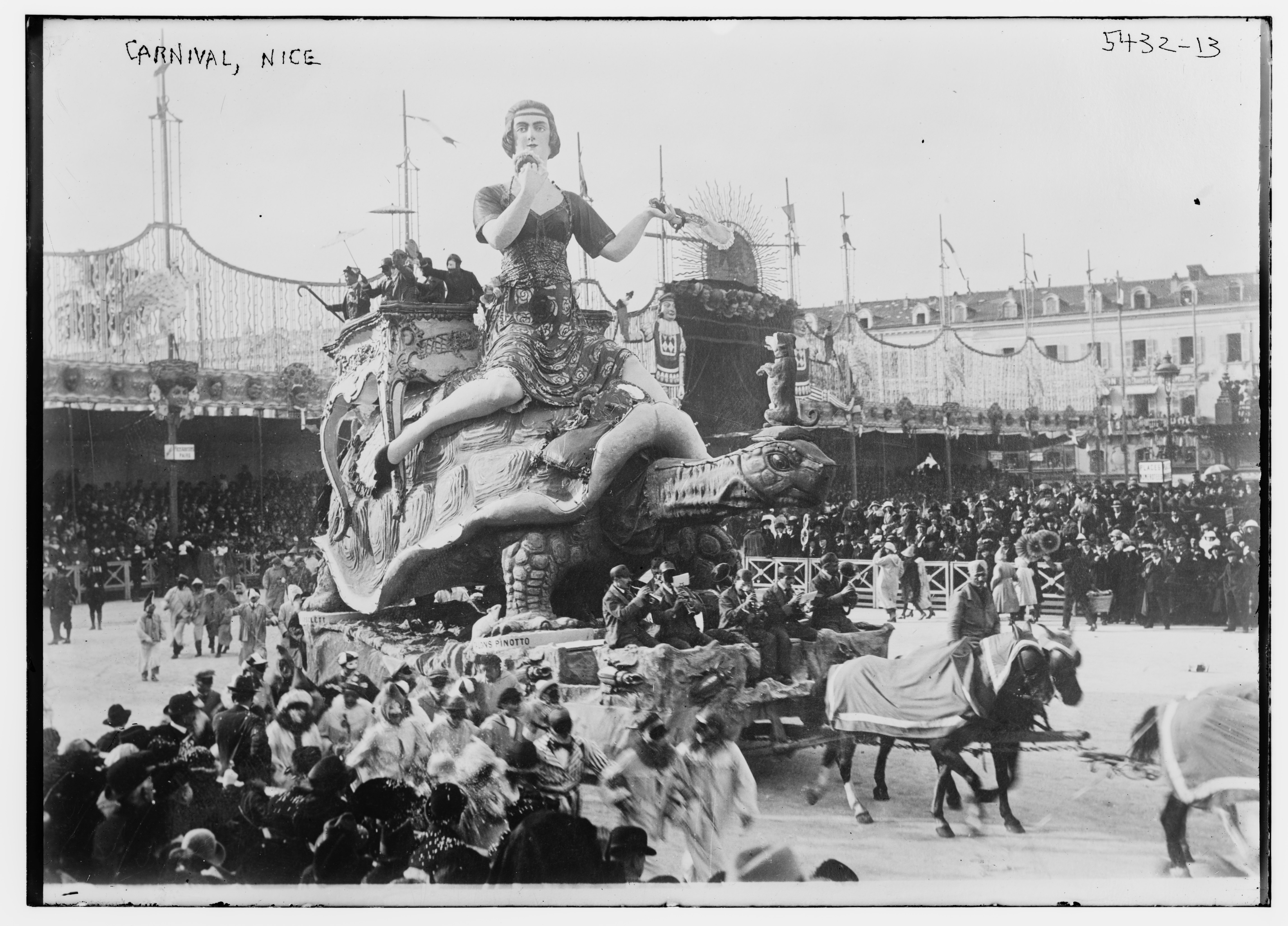
Nice Carnival 1900
