= Anne Portugal =

French poet (born 1949)

Anne Portugal (born 29 March 1949) is a French poet who lives and works in Paris. She was born in Angers (Maine-et-Loire) and attended Paris 8 University in the suburbs of Paris.

Her work is influenced by, and often references, Jacques Roubaud as well as contemporary sources such as instruction booklets and video games.

Her recent work Définitif bob (translated both by Jennifer Moxley as absolute bob as well as by Norma Cole as Virtual bob ) has been the subject of considerable critical and popular interest. It is speculated that bob is short for bobine, a French word meaning "coil" and the origin of the English word "bobbin". bob (lower-case is mandatory) is a character (a minuscule joker) who lives in a television set (la télé où il est mais dedans à l'envers, the telly where he is but inside the wrong way round) who is a specialist in the mission serrée horizontale (close-fought horizontal mission is one possible translation).

A recurring motif is bob il peut comme ça (untranslatable, perhaps bob, just like that, ...). Another notable feature is the absence of punctuation in the 24 sections of the 128 page book involving the reader in the construction of its meaning.

== Works ==
- Valentina Gosetti, Andrea Bedeschi, Adriano Marchetti, eds. Donne. Poeti di Francia e Oltre. Dal Romanticismo a Oggi (translated by Valentina Gosetti). Giuliano Ladolfi Editore, 2017. ISBN 978-88-6644-349-0
- Writing the Real: A Bilingual Anthology of Contemporary French Poetry (translated by Jennifer Moxley), 2016. Enitharmon Press
- Mise en scène de Eric Vautrin, P.O.L, 2003.
- Définitif bob, P.O.L, May 2002.
  - Eric Vautrin has created a theatrical 'version', presented at the Théâtre des Ateliers, Lyon. A performance is described at some length in Définitif Bob ou la poésie contemporaine... (in French)
- Et les gens contents de se baigner, RUP&RUD, 2001.
- Voyer en l'air. Editions de l'attente, "Week-end", 2001.
- Dans la reproduction en 2 parties égales des plantes et des animaux, P.O.L, 2001. (in collaboration with Suzanne Doppelt).
- La réalité en face/la quoi ?, Al Dante/RROZ, 1999. (in collaboration with Caroline Dubois)
- Le plus simple appareil, P.O.L, 1992.
  - A modern re-telling of the biblical story of Susannah and the elders, translated as Nude by Norma Cole, Kelsey St., 2001.
- Fichier, Éditions Michel Chandeigne, 1992.
- Souris au lait, Messidor-la Farandole : 01-Bellegarde, Impr. SADAG, 1989, ISBN 2-209-06113-X
- De quoi faire un mur, P.O.L, 1987.
- Les Commodités d'une banquette, P.O.L, 1985.
- La Licence, qu'on appelle autrement parrhésie, Gallimard, 1980.
