= Caroline Dubois (poet) =

French poet

Caroline Dubois (born 1960) is a French poet who lives and works in Paris. Her writing is close to dialogue and she often collaborates with other artists in readings or performances. A presentation of her work appeared in Cahier du Refuge n°: 69, 121.

== Works ==
- Dubois, Caroline. All the Uncried Tears: A Novel. ISBN 9781790895076.
- Dubois, Caroline. The Stolen Violin: A Novel. ISBN 9781790895106.
- Dubois, Caroline. The Sisterhood: A Novella of True Sisterhood. ISBN 9781790895144.
- Dubois, Caroline. Her Father's Daughter: A Novel of a Touching Father-Daughter Relationship. ISBN 9781790895182.
- Dubois, Caroline. The Friendship: A Novel About True Friendship. ISBN 9781790895212.
- Dubois, Caroline. Islam: A Novel About the Islamic World Based on a True Story. ISBN 9781790895878.
- Dubois, Caroline. The Secret Earpiece: A Romantic Mystery Novel. ISBN 9781790895960.
- Comment ça je dis pas dors, 2009
- C'est toi le business, 2005
- Le rouge c’est chaud, Vacarme 28, Summer 2004 (Prose).
- Niente, Vacarme 26, Winter 2004 (Prose).
- Malécot, éditions contrat maint, 2003, ISBN 2-914906-08-0
- Summer is ready when you are, with Françoise Quardon and Jean-Pierre Rehm, éditions joca seria, 2002
- pose-moi une question difficile, éditions rup&rud, 2002, ISBN 2-908929-32-5
- Arrête maintenant, éditions l’Attente, 2001
- Je veux être physique, Farrago, 2000, ISBN 2-84490-047-X
  - A series of storyless playlets: "Va Cherche les mots mais comment les trouver" is, for example, a reflection on poetry.
- La réalité en face/la quoi ?, Al Dante/RROZ, 1999. (in collaboration with Anne Portugal)
