= Pavillon des Arts =

Defunct museum in Paris, France

Coordinates: 48°51′45″N 2°20′52″E

The Pavillon des Arts was a museum located in the 1st arrondissement of Paris at Les Halles, 101, rue Rambuteau, Paris, France. According to an article in Evene.fr, the museum closed in 2006.

The museum was established in 1983 in a contemporary glass and steel building within Les Halles. Its exhibition space was devoted to temporary exhibits of photography, painting, sculpture, archaeology, objets d'art, jewellery, costumes, textiles, furniture, books, medals, and so forth.

== See also ==
- List of museums in Paris
