= Marguerite Aucouturier =

French psychoanalyst and translator (1932–2020)

- Born: 7 July 1932; Prague, Czechoslovakia
- Died: 21 March 2020 (aged 87); Paris, France
- Resting place: Ris-Orangis
- Occupations: Psychoanalyst; Translator
- Spouse: Jacques Derrida (m. 1957; died 2004)
- Children: 3, including Pierre Alféri

Marguerite Derrida (née Aucouturier; 7 July 1932 – 21 March 2020) was a Czech-born French psychoanalyst. She translated many psychoanalytic works into French.

== Biography ==
Aucouturier trained as a psychologist at the Paris Psychoanalytic Society, and translated many works by Melanie Klein. She trained in anthropology with André Leroi-Gourhan in the 1960s.

=== Personal life ===
Aucutourier was born in Prague on 7 July 1932 to Gustave Aucouturier, a French journalist, and Marie Alferi, a Czech. She married Jacques Derrida on 9 June 1957 in Cambridge, Massachusetts. Together they had three children. One of their sons was writer Pierre Alféri. She appeared in two documentary films where she talks about life with her husband in Ris-Orangis.

Marguerite Derrida died in Paris on Saturday 21 March 2020 from a COVID-19 infection at the age of 87.

== Translations into French by Marguerite Aucouturier ==
- Melanie Klein:
  - Essais de psychanalyse. 1921–1945, Payot, 1984.
  - Deuil et dépression, Payot et Rivages, 2004
  - Psychanalyse d'enfants, Payot et Rivages, 2005
  - Le complexe d'Œdipe, Payot et Rivages, 2006
  - Sur l'enfant, Payot et Rivages, 2012
- Iouri Ianovski, Les Cavaliers, Paris, Éditions Gallimard, trans. in collaboration with P. Zankiévitch and Elyane Jacquet, reviewed and presented by Louis Aragon, 1957
- Roman Jakobson, La génération qui a gaspillé ses poètes, Paris, Allia, 2001.
- Maxim Gorki, Vie de Klim Samguine, 1961
- Vladimir Propp, Morphologie du conte

== Sources ==
- Benoît Peeters, Benoît (2010). Derrida (in French). Flammarion. ISBN 9782081214071.
- Benoît Peeters, Trois ans avec Derrida. Les carnets d'un biographe, Paris, Flammarion, 2010, 248 pp.
- (in English) David Mikics, Who Was Jacques Derrida? An Intellectual Biography, 2009, New Haven, Yale University Press, 288 pp., ISBN 9780300115420
