= Musée des Beaux-Arts de Nice =

Coordinates: 43°41′40.5″N 7°14′56″E

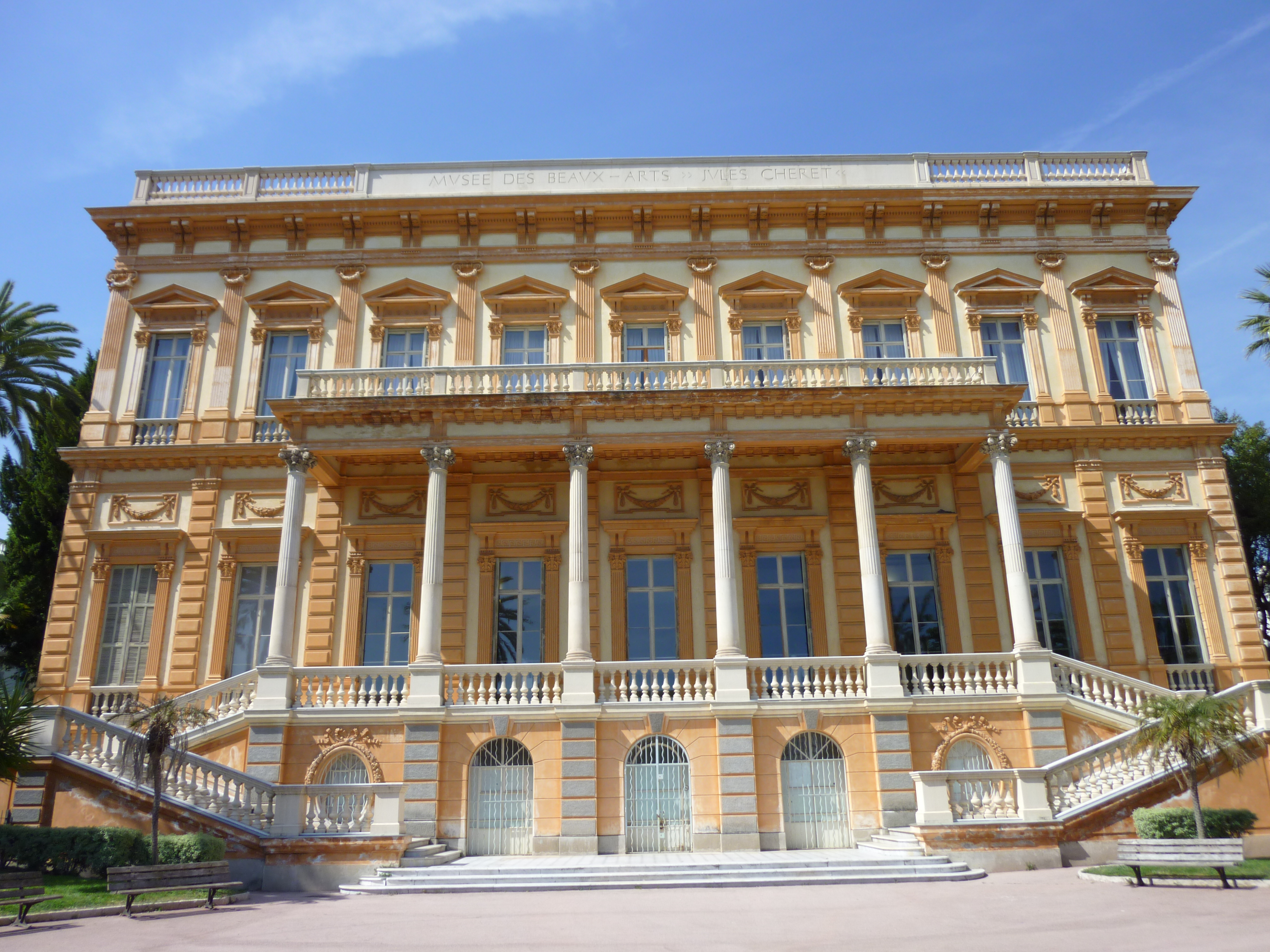

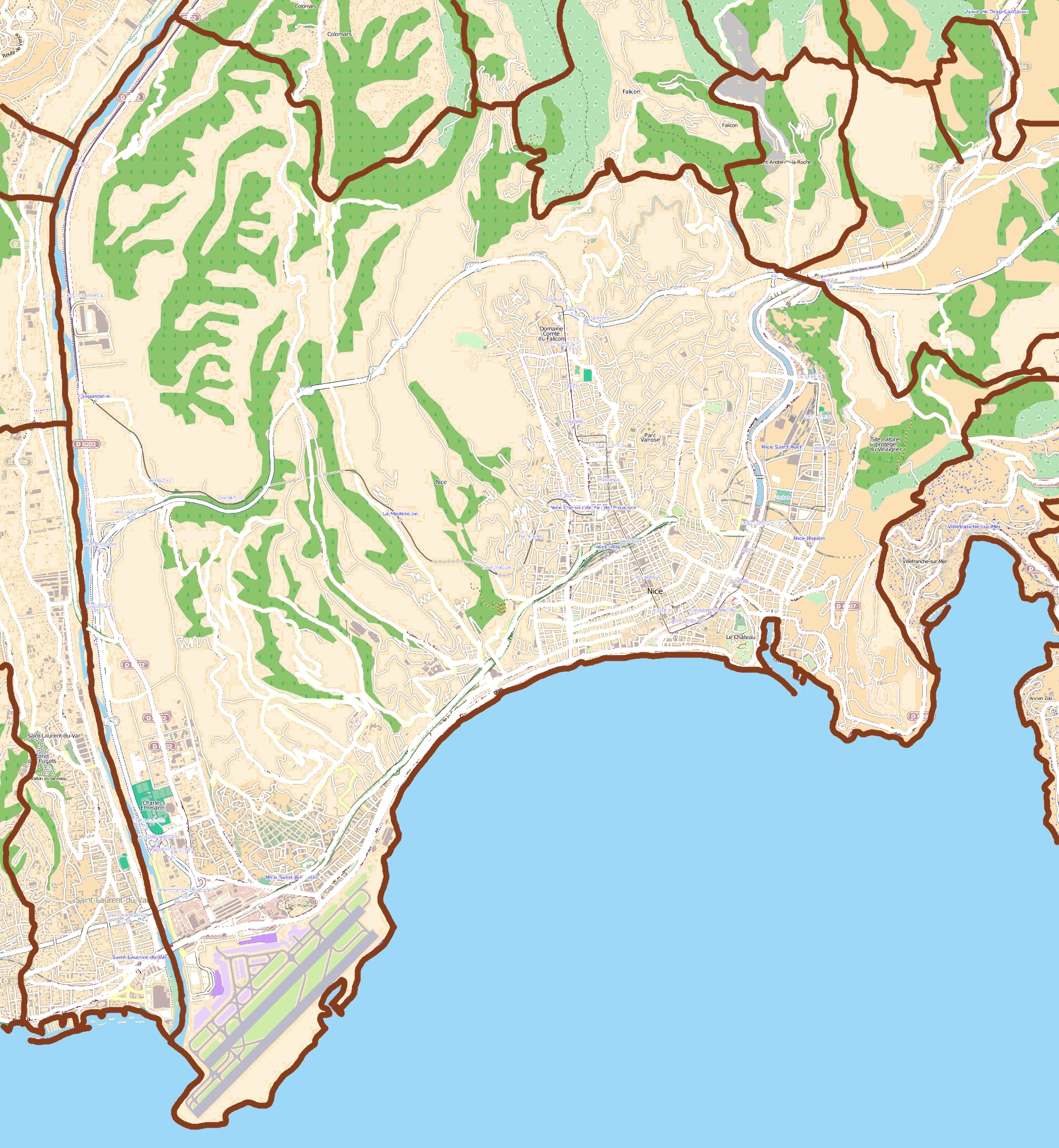
- Location within Nice
- Established: 1928
- Location: Nice, France
- Type: Art museum

The Musée des Beaux-Arts de Nice in Nice, France at 33 av. des Baumettes was built in the former private mansion built in 1878 by the Russian Princess, Elizaveta Vasilievna Kochubey. Named for the artist Jules Chéret who lived and worked in Nice during his final years, the museum opened as the "Palais des Arts Jules Chéret" on 7 January 1928.

== Collection ==
The museum houses a collection of art spanning the past four centuries. There are paintings by Chéret and other artists who lived and worked on the French Riviera, such as Alexis Mossa, and his son Gustav-Adolf Mossa, who for many years were curators of the museum. The small museum has sculptures by Jean-Baptiste Carpeaux, François Rude, Michel de Tarnowsky and Auguste Rodin, plus ceramic pieces by Pablo Picasso. Some of the paintings are from:

- Marie Bashkirtseff
- Pierre Bonnard
- Jan Brueghel the Elder
- Bronzino
- Benjamin Constant
- Kees van Dongen
- Raoul Dufy
- Jean-Honoré Fragonard
- Marie Laurencin
- Luc-Olivier Merson
- Édouard Vuillard

== Gallery ==
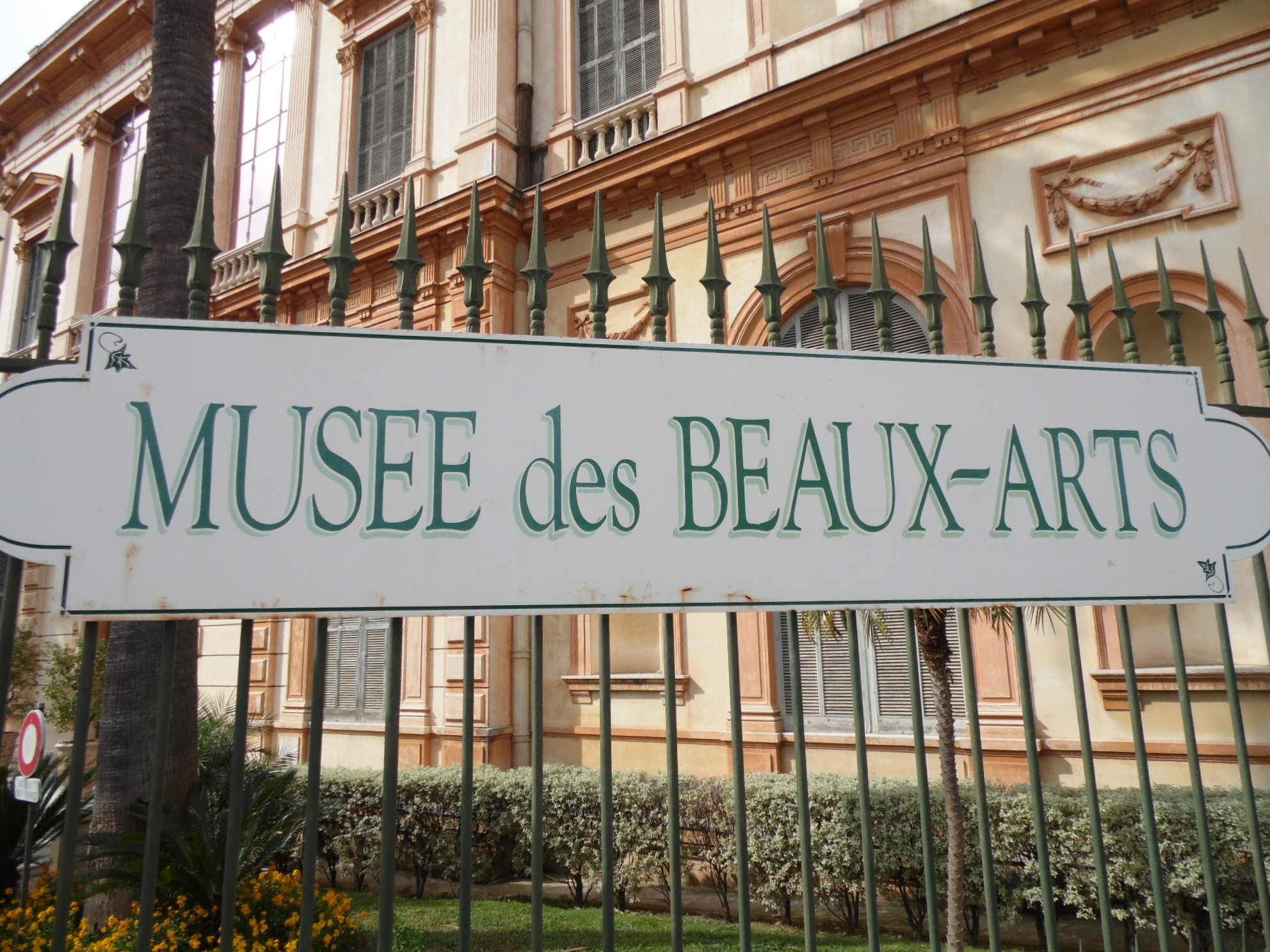

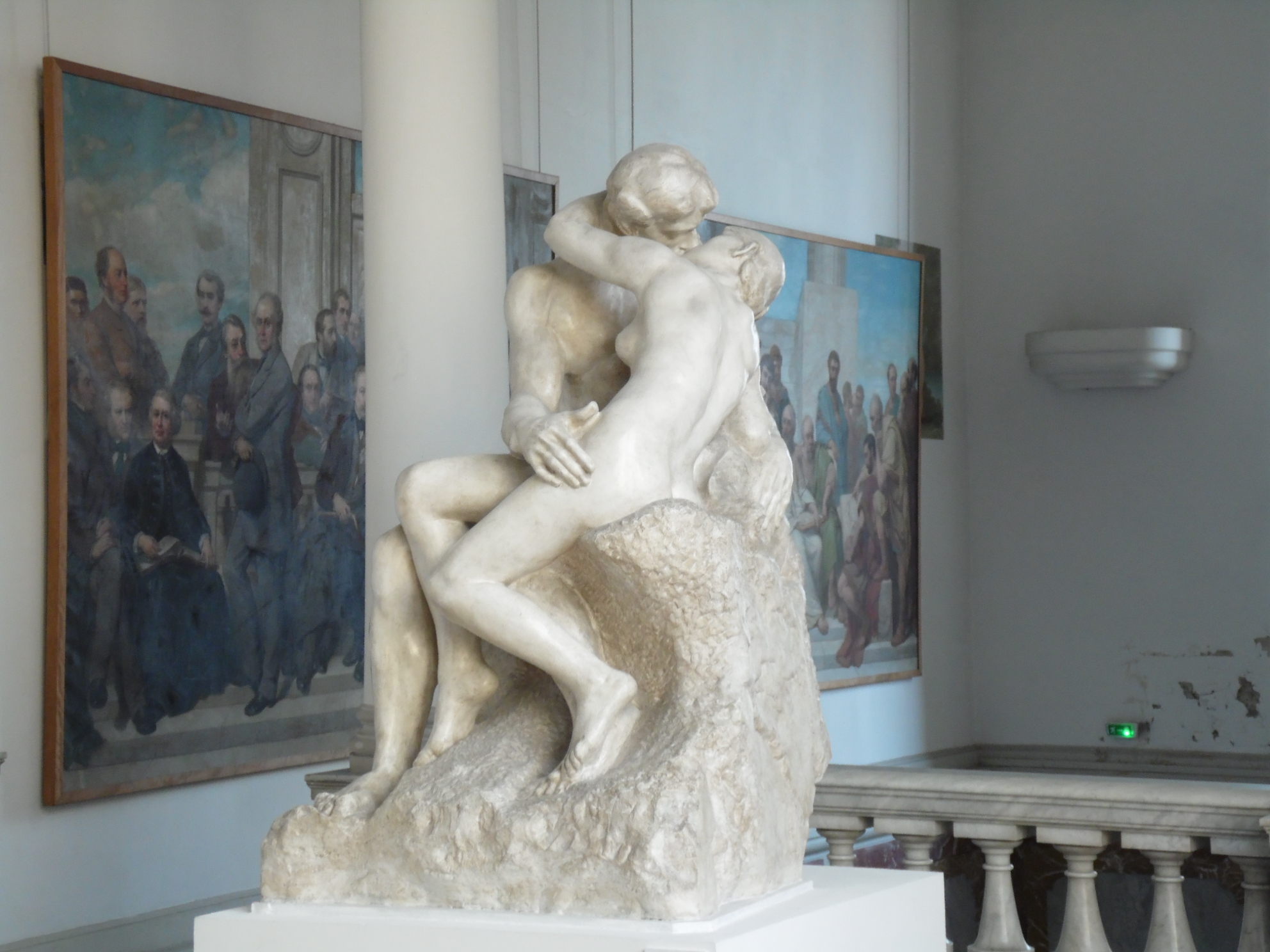

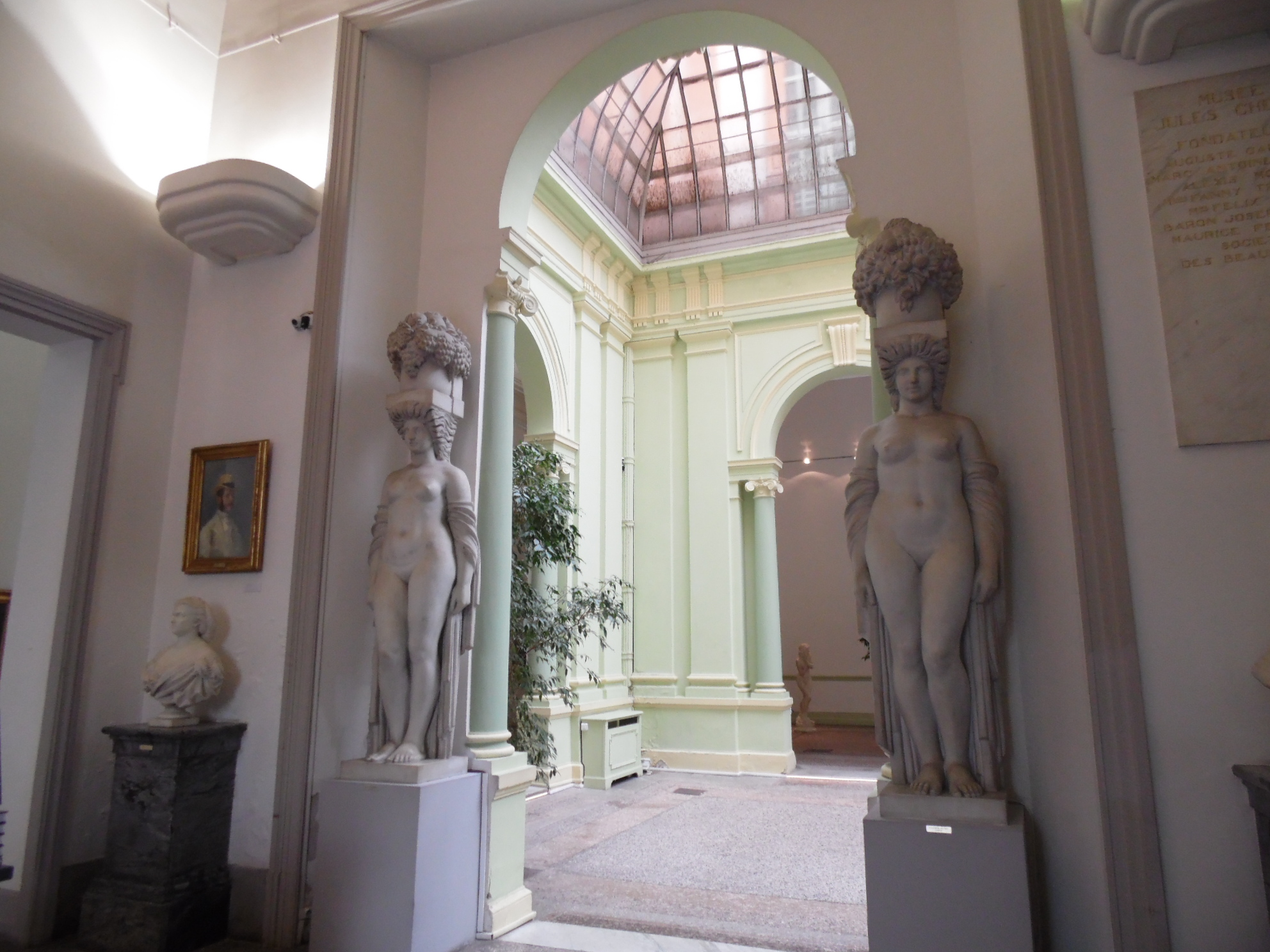
