= Cantons of the Alpes-Maritimes department =

This is a list of the 27 cantons of the Alpes-Maritimes department, in France, following the French canton reorganisation which came into effect in March 2015:

- Antibes-1
- Antibes-2
- Antibes-3
- Beausoleil
- Cagnes-sur-Mer-1
- Cagnes-sur-Mer-2
- Cannes-1
- Cannes-2
- Le Cannet
- Contes
- Grasse-1
- Grasse-2
- Mandelieu-la-Napoule
- Menton
- Nice-1
- Nice-2
- Nice-3
- Nice-4
- Nice-5
- Nice-6
- Nice-7
- Nice-8
- Nice-9
- Tourrette-Levens
- Valbonne
- Vence
- Villeneuve-Loubet
