= Timeline of Nice =

The following is a timeline of the history of the city of Nice, France.

== Prior to 19th century ==
- 262 CE - Nice taken by Goth forces.
- 859 - Nice sacked by Saracens.
- 880 - Nice sacked by Saracens again.
- 1388 - Dedication of Nice to Savoy effected.
- 1538 - Peace treaty signed in Nice.
- 1543 - Siege of Nice by Turkish forces.
- 1545 - Pont-Vieux, Nice (bridge) rebuilt.
- 1561 - Italian replaces Latin as official language of Nice.
- 1564 - Major earthquake.
- 1650/85 - Nice Cathedral constructed.
- 1706 - Castle of Nice demolished by Duke of Berwick by command of Louis XIV.
- 1720
  - Nice becomes part of the Kingdom of Sardinia.
  - Medical school established.
- 1722 - Hôtel de Ville built.
- 1724 - Abbaye Saint-Pons de Nice church built.
- 1770 - Quai des Ponchettes built.
- 1772 - Gazette de Nice newspaper begins publication.
- 1780 - Route Royale Nice-Turin paved.
- 1783 - Cimetière du Château (cemetery) established.
- 1784 - Chapelle du Saint-Sépulcre de Nice built.
- 1790 - Public library founded.
- 1792 - Conquered by French Revolutionary troops in September, annexed in November.
- 1793
  - Nice becomes part of the Alpes-Maritimes department of France.
  - Population: 24,117.
- 1800 - May: Nice occupied briefly by Austrian forces.^{(fr)}

== 19th century ==
- 1812 - Lycée Masséna (school) opens.
- 1814 - Nice is returned to and thus becomes part of the Kingdom of Sardinia per Congress of Vienna.
- 1822 - Promenade des Anglais construction begins.
- 1832 - 25 April: Religious Vow of Nice taken in response to cholera epidemic.
- 1846 - Muséum d'histoire naturelle de Nice founded.
- 1852
  - Église Notre-Dame-des-Grâces (church) built.
  - English circulating library active.
- 1854 - Jardin Albert 1er (park) opens.
- 1855 - Maritime trade flourishes.
- 1856 - Population: 44,091.
- 1860 - Annexation of the County of Nice to France.
- 1861 - Francization begins.
- 1863 - Phare du Littoral newspaper begins publication.
- 1864
  - Avenue Jean Médecin laid out.
  - Nice-Ville station opened.
- 1867 - Russian Orthodox Cemetery, Nice, established.
- 1870 - Swiss and Nice Times newspaper begins publication.
- 1871 - Niçard Vespers, three days of popular uprising in support of the union of the County of Nice with the Kingdom of Italy.
- 1879
  - Horsecar tramway begins operating.
  - Le Petit Niçois newspaper begins publication.
- 1881 - 23 March: Opéra de Nice burns down.
- 1882
  - Promenade of Nice built.
  - Pont-Neuf (Nice) (bridge) demolished.
- 1883 - L'Éclaireur newspaper begins publication.
- 1884 - Casino municipal de Nice built.
- 1885 - Opéra de Nice rebuilt.
- 1886 - Synagogue de Nice built.
- 1887 - Nice Observatory inaugurated.
- 1890 - Nice Lawn Tennis Club established.
- 1891
  - 4 October: Garibaldi monument, Nice unveiled in Place Garibaldi.
  - Population: 88,273.
- 1892
  - Gare du Sud built.
  - Grasse-Nice Chemins de Fer de Provence (railway) begins operating.
- 1896 - Monument du Centenaire erected in the Jardin Albert 1er.
- 1900 - Electric tramway begins operating.

== 20th century ==
=== 1901-1944 ===
- 1901 - Population: 105,109.
- 1903 - A la mieu bella Nissa popular song written.
- 1904
  - Gymnaste Club de Nice formed.
  - Promenade des Anglais extended to the river Var.
- 1911 - Population: 142,940.
- 1912 - Russian Orthodox Cathedral opens, funded by Tsar Nicholas II of Russia.
- 1913 - Hotel Negresco in business.
- 1916 - Conservatory of Nice founded.
- 1919
  - Canton of Nice-1, 2, 3, and 4 created.
  - Victorine Studios of film established.
- 1927 - Stade du Ray (stadium) opens.
- 1928 - Palais des Arts opens.
- 1929 - Palais de la Méditerranée casino opens.
- 1931 - Population: 219,549.
- 1933 - Église Notre-Dame-Auxiliatrice de Nice (church) built.
- 1942 - 11 November: Italian occupation begins.
- 1943 - 8 September: Italian occupation ends.
- 1944
  - 26 May: Bombing by Allied forces.^{(fr)}
  - 28 August: Battle of Nice.

=== 1945-1990s ===
- 1945 - Nice-matin newspaper begins publication.
- 1948 - Nice Jazz Festival begins.
- 1954
  - Centre International de Formation Européenne headquartered in Nice.
  - Population: 244,360.
- 1955 - Canton of Nice-5 and 6 created.
- 1956 - Fountain installed in the Place Masséna.
- 1963 - Musée Matisse opens.
- 1968 - Population: 322,442.
- 1970 - Palais Lascaris (musical instrument museum) opened.
- 1973
  - Nice University Hospital established.
  - Canton of Nice-7, 8, 9, 10, and 11 created.
- 1979 - 16 October: Weather-related 1979 Nice events occur.
- 1981 - June: 1981 Tour de France cycling race departs from Nice.^{(fr)}
- 1982
  - Canton of Nice-12, 13, and 14 created.
  - Nice becomes part of the Provence-Alpes-Côte d'Azur region.
- 1984 - Palais des Congrès Acropolis built.
- 1988 - Le Standard de Nice newspaper begins publication.
- 1991 - Gare de Nice CP opens.
- 1995 - Jacques Peyrat becomes mayor.
- 1999
  - Forum d'urbanisme et d'architecture established.
  - Population: 342,738.

== 21st century . ==
=== 2000s ===
- 2001 - 26 February: European Treaty of Nice signed in city.
- 2002 - Urban community of Nice Côte d'Azur created.
- 2003 - Bombing.
- 2007 - Nice tramway opens.
- 2008 - Christian Estrosi becomes mayor.

=== 2010s ===
- 2011
  - Metropolis Nice Côte d'Azur created.
  - Population: 344,064.
- 2013
  - Allianz Riviera stadium opens.
  - 2013 Jeux de la Francophonie held in Nice.
- 2014 - March: Nice municipal election, 2014 held.
- 2015
  - February: Stabbing.
  - October: 2015 Alpes-Maritimes flood occurs.
  - December: 2015 Provence-Alpes-Côte d'Azur regional election held.
- 2016 - July: Terrorist attack kills 86 and injures 434.

=== 2020s ===
- 2020 - October: Terrorist attack kills three, with one victim being beheaded.
- 2023 - November: Junior Eurovision Song Contest 2023 held.
- 2024 - July: Arson attack kills 7 and injures 33

== See also ==
- Nice history
- History of Nice
- List of mayors of Nice
- List of heritage sites in Nice
- Other names of Nice
- Archives communales de Nice
- History of Alpes-Maritimes department
- Timeline of Provence region

Other cities in the Provence-Alpes-Côte d'Azur region:

- Timeline of Aix-en-Provence
- Timeline of Arles
- Timeline of Avignon
- Timeline of Marseille
- Timeline of Toulon

== Bibliography ==
=== in English ===
- David Brewster, ed. (1832). "Nice". Edinburgh Encyclopaedia. Philadelphia: Joseph and Edward Parker. hdl:2027/uc2.ark:/13960/t2x352b0z.
- Mariana Starke (1839), "Nice", Travels in Europe (9th ed.), Paris: A. and W. Galignani
- "Nice". Hand-book for Travellers in Northern Italy (10th ed.). London: John Murray. 1866.
- "Nice". Italy (2nd ed.). Coblenz: Karl Baedeker. 1870.
- William Henry Overall, ed. (1870). "Nice". Dictionary of Chronology. London: William Tegg. hdl:2027/uc2.ark:/13960/t9m32q949.
- "Nice". The Riviera (9th ed.). London: Adam & Charles Black. 1896.
- T. G. Bonney; et al. (1904). "Nice". The Mediterranean, its Storied Cities and Venerable Ruins. New York: J. Pott.
- Nice, Beaulieu and Monaco. Guides Joanne. Hachette. 1906.
- S. Kahn (1907), "Nice", Jewish Encyclopedia, vol. 9, New York: [s.l.] : Ktav Publishing House
- Practical Guide to Nice. Guides Pol. Lyon: Société des guides Pol. circa 1907
- "Nice (France)" . Encyclopædia Britannica. Vol. 19 (11th ed.). 1910. pp. 646–647.
- Benjamin Vincent (1910), "Nice", Haydn's Dictionary of Dates (25th ed.), London: Ward, Lock & Co., hdl:2027/loc.ark:/13960/t89g6g776
- Georges Goyau (1911). "Nice". Catholic Encyclopedia. New York: New York, The Encyclopedia Press.
- "Nice". Southern France (6th ed.). Leipzig: Baedeker. 1914.
- Daniel C. Haskell, ed. (1922), "Provencal literature and language, including the local history of southern France", Bulletin of the New York Public Library, vol. 26, hdl:2027/mdp.39015035117657, "Local history: Nice"
- "Talk of Nice", New York Times, 17 March 1984

=== in French ===
- "Nice". Dictionnaire Bouillet (in French) (34th ed.). Paris. 1914. hdl:2027/mdp.39015074817142.
