= Departmental Council of Alpes-Maritimes =

Departmental legislature in France

Departmental Council of Alpes-Maritimes Conseil départemental des Alpes-Maritimes (French)
- Logo of the Council

Leadership
- President: Charles-Ange Ginésy, LR

Website
- www.departement06.fr

The Departmental Council of Alpes-Maritimes (French: Conseil départemental des Alpes-Maritimes) is the deliberative assembly of the French department of Alpes-Maritimes. Its headquarters are in Nice.

== Executive ==
=== Presidents ===
The president of the departmental council of Alpes-Maritimes is Charles Ange Ginésy (LR) since 2017.

List of successive presidents
Period		Name	Party
1945	1947	Virgile Barel	PCF
1947	1951	André Botton	SFIO
1951	1961	Jean Médecin	RI
1961	1964	Francis Palmero	CG
1964	1967	Joseph Raybaud	DVC
1967	1973	Francis Palmero	CD
1973	1990	Jacques Médecin	CNIP
1990	2003	Charles Ginésy	RPR then UMP
2003	2008	Christian Estrosi	UMP
2008	2017	Éric Ciotti	UMP then LR
2017	In progress	Charles Ange Ginésy	LR

=== Vice-presidents ===
The president of the departmental council is assisted by 16 vice-presidents chosen from among the departmental councillors. Each of them has a delegation of authority.

List of vice-presidents of the departmental council of Alpes-Maritimes (as of 2021)
Order	Name	Canton (constituency)	Delegation
1st	Xavier Beck	Beausoleil	General administration and evaluation of public policies
2nd	Anne Sattonnet	Vence	Natural risks and departmental heritage
3rd	David Lisnard	Cannes-2	Tourism
4th	Gaëlle Frontoni	Nice-9	Cultural heritage and veterans
5th	Auguste Verola	Nice-1	Children and culture
6th	Marie Benassayag	Villeneuve-Loubet	Sea and transport
7th	Jérôme Viaud	Grasse-1	Green Deal, environment and green growth
8th	Valérie Sergi	Nice-1	Disability
9th	Patrick Cesari	Menton	Infrastructure, road mobility and relations with Monaco
10th	Michèle Paganin	Mandelieu-la-Napoule	Rurality and agricultural policies
11th	Bernard Chaix	Nice-8	Integration, employment and trade
12th	Joëlle Arini	Cannes-1	Education and colleges
13th	Jacques Gente	Antibes-2	Health and the elderly
14th	Carine Papy	Cagnes-sur-Mer-1	Youth and sports
15th	David Konopnicki	Mandelieu-la-Napoule	Smart deal, technology and innovation

== Composition ==
The departmental council includes 54 departmental councilors from the 27 cantons of Alpes-Maritimes. The absolute majority is historically on the right.

Political composition (as of 2021)
Party	Acronym	Seats	Group
Majority (52 seats)
The Republicans	LR	35	Les Républicains et Divers droite
Miscellaneous right	DVD	2	Les Républicains et Divers droite
The Republicans	LR	10	Notre département d'abord
Union of Democrats and Independents	UDI	5	Notre département d'abord
Opposition (2 seats)
Socialist Party	PS	1	Environnement et Solidarités
Europe Ecology-The Greens	EELV	1	Environnement et Solidarités
