= Alpes-Maritimes's 3rd constituency =

Constituency of the National Assembly of France

3rd constituency of Alpes Maritimes
- inline Constituency of the National Assembly of France

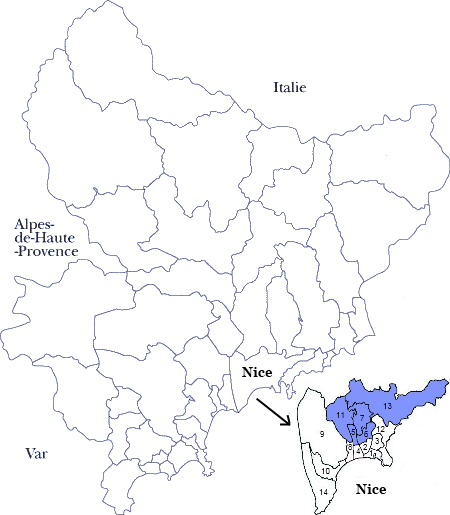
- 3rd Constituency (after 2010) in department

- Alpes Maritimes in France
- Deputy: Bernard Chaix; LR (UXD)
- Department: Alpes Maritimes
- Cantons: Nice-8, Nice-10, Nice-11, Nice-13

The 3rd constituency of the Alpes Maritimes is a French legislative constituency in the Alpes Maritimes département. It goes around the outskirts of the city of Nice, including the communities of Falicon, Saint-André-de-la-Roche, and La Trinité. At the last count, it had 109,573 inhabitants.

It is currently represented by Bernard Chaix of LR.

== Historic representation ==
Election	Member	Party
1988	Rudy Salles	UDF
1993	Rudy Salles	UDF
1997	Rudy Salles	UDF
2002	Rudy Salles	UDF
2007	Rudy Salles	NC
2012	Rudy Salles	NC
2017	Cédric Roussel	LREM
2022	Philippe Pradal	H
2024	Bernard Chaix	LR

== Election results ==
=== 2024 ===
Candidate	Party	Alliance	First round		Second round	
Candidate	Party	Alliance	Votes	%	Votes	%
Bernard Chaix	LR-RN	UXD	23,983	41.47	28,884	53.71
Laure Quignard	PS	NFP	15,754	27.24	24,897	46.29
Philippe Pradal	HOR	Ensemble	14,760	25.36		
Marie Françoise Caussin	ECO		1,675	2.90		
Thibault Delhez	DLF		883	1.53		
Estelle Jaquet	LO		438	0.76		
Marjorie Vivo	DIV		434	0.75		
Valid votes			57,837	98.01	53,781	93.57
Blank votes			763	1.29	2,904	5.05
Null votes			412	0.70	794	1.38
Turnout			59,012	64.34	57,479	62.66
Abstentions			32,712	35.66	33,249	37.34
Registered voters			91,724		91,728	
Result			LR GAIN			

=== 2022 ===
Candidate	Label	First round		Second round	
Candidate	Label	Votes	%	Votes	%
Philippe Pradal	Horizons	10,113	26.04	19,043	57.44
Enzo Giusti	NUPES	8,524	21.95	14,111	42.56
Benoît Kandel	NR	6,668	17.17		
Laurent Castillo	LR	4,973	12.81		
Philippe Vardon	Reconquête	4,217	10.86		
David-André Darmon	Eco	1,062	2.73		
Dominique Boy-Mottard	RDG	1,023	2.63		
Marie-Françoise Caussin	Eco	613	1.58		
Marie-Ange Riviere	DSV	550	1.42		
Gabriel-Kayne Mercier	Eco	540	1.39		
Estelle Jaquet	DXG	259	0.67		
Sylvie Bonaldi	Eco	207	0.53		
Yann Benoit	DIV	84	0.22		
Votes		38,833	100.00	33,154	100.00
Valid votes		38,833	98.29	33,154	90.46
Blank votes		217	1.16	2,425	6.62
Null votes		217	0.55	1,071	2.92
Turnout		39,508	43.03	36,650	39.92
Abstentions		52,313	56.97	55,165	60.08
Registered voters		91,821		91,845	
Source: Ministry of the Interior

=== 2017 ===
Candidate	Label	First round		Second round	
Candidate	Label	Votes	%	Votes	%
Cédric Roussel	REM	12,727	31.91	19,762	60.84
Philippe Vardon	FN	8,476	21.25	12,720	39.16
Rudy Salles	UDI	8,176	20.50		
Bruno Coulet	FI	4,459	11.18		
Raphaël Galmiche	PS	1,284	3.22		
Juliette Chesnel-Le Roux	ECO	1,061	2.66		
Stanislas André	DVD	838	2.10		
Muriel Loubet	DLF	739	1.85		
Chantal Fontanesi	DVD	707	1.77		
Éric Gilli	DIV	452	1.13		
Isabelle Di Mascio	DIV	395	0.99		
Geneviève Blache	DIV	235	0.59		
Marie-José Pereira	EXG	197	0.49		
Karim Akasbi	DIV	116	0.29		
Renaud Deconde	DIV	28	0.07		
Didier Asin	DVD	0	0.00		
Votes		39,890	100.00	32,482	100.00
Valid votes		39,890	98.30	32,482	91.82
Blank votes		460	1.13	2,119	5.99
Null votes		228	0.56	776	2.19
Turnout		40,578	45.52	35,377	39.69
Abstentions		48,559	54.48	53,760	60.31
Registered voters		89,137		89,137	
Source: Ministry of the Interior

=== 2012 ===
Summary of the 10 June and 17 June 2012 French legislative in Alpes-Maritimes's 3rd Constituency election results
Candidate	Party		1st round		2nd round	
Candidate	Party		Votes	%	Votes	%
Rudy Salles	New Centre	NC	17,420	36.80%	25,060	58.73%
Christine Dorejo	Socialist Party	PS	10,891	23.01%	17,611	41.27%
Gaël Nofri	National Front	FN	10,770	22.75%		
Roseline Grac	Left Front	FG	2,370	5.01%		
Jean-Christophe Picard	Regionalist	REG	2,032	4.29%		
Marouane Bouloudhnine	Centre for France	MoDem	833	1.76%		
Marie-José Vallad	Ecologist	ECO	558	1.18%		
Bruno Della Sudda	Far Left	EXG	518	1.09%		
Marie-Edith Cattet	Other far-right	EXD	387	0.82%		
Delphine Delétang	Ecologist	ECO	337	0.71%		
Sylvain Maillot	Others	AUT	248	0.52%		
Didier Burdin	Miscellaneous Right	DVD	234	0.49%		
Patrick Monica	Miscellaneous Right	DVD	218	0.46%		
Laurent Baccino	Far Left	EXG	167	0.35%		
Denis Roos	Miscellaneous Right	DVD	143	0.30%		
Igor Kurek	Miscellaneous Right	DVD	125	0.26%		
Marie-José Pereira	Far Left	EXG	81	0.17%		
Total			47,332	100%	42,671	100%
Registered voters			87,373		87,373	
Blank/Void ballots			561	0.64%	1,786	2.04%
Turnout			47,893	54.81%	44,457	50.88%
Abstentions			39,480	45.19%	42,916	49.12%
Result					| NC HOLD	

=== 2007 ===
Legislative Election 2007: Alpes Maritimes 3rd
Party	Candidate	Votes	%	±%
NM	Rudy Salles	21,805	56.65	
PRG	Elodie Jomat	7,372	19.15	
FN	Gilbert Pigli	2,998	7.79	
PCF	Adeline Mouton	1,447	3.76	
Far right	Myriam Marchand	963	2.50	
MPF	Pierre Argentieri	790	2.05	
LV	Rémi Gaechter	786	2.04	
LCR	Bruno Della Suda	507	1.32	
DVE	Serge Gardien	425	1.10	
Independent	Elie Guez	352	0.91	
MNR	Jean-Marie Baële	328	0.85	
Independent	Nadia Aouassi	288	0.75	
DVG	Laurent Bacino	247	0.64	
LO	Marie-Josée Pereira	185	0.48	
Turnout		39,368	56.22	
NM hold		Swing		

=== 2002 ===
Legislative Election 2002: Alpes-Maritimes's 3rd constituency
Party	Candidate	Votes	%	±%
UDF	Rudy Salles	17,207	43.06	
FN	Isabelle Gerard	9,499	23.77	
LV	Juliette Chesnel le Roux	7,996	20.01	
PCF	Marie Billi	1,846	4.62	
Others	N/A	3,416		
Turnout		40,590	56.00	
2nd round result
UDF	Rudy Salles	22,280	71.00	
FN	Isabelle Gerard	9,101	29.00	
Turnout		34,572	47.63	
UDF hold				

=== 1997 ===
Legislative Election 1997: Alpes-Maritimes's 3rd constituency
Party	Candidate	Votes	%	±%
UDF	Rudy Salles	11,845	29.48	
FN	Jean-Pierre Schenardi	10,164	25.29	
PS	Michèle Matringe	7,436	18.50	
PCF	Joseph-Louis Broch	4,923	12.25	
MPF	Jacques de Rocca Serra	1,836	4.57	
GE	Brigitte Bergeron	864	2.15	
Others	N/A	3,116		
Turnout		41,541	57.51	
2nd round result
UDF	Rudy Salles	23,639	66.39	
FN	Jean-Pierre Schenardi	11,967	33.61	
Turnout		41,421	57.35	
UDF hold				

== Sources ==
Results at the Ministry of the Interior (French)
