= Bernard Chaix =

French politician (born 1965)

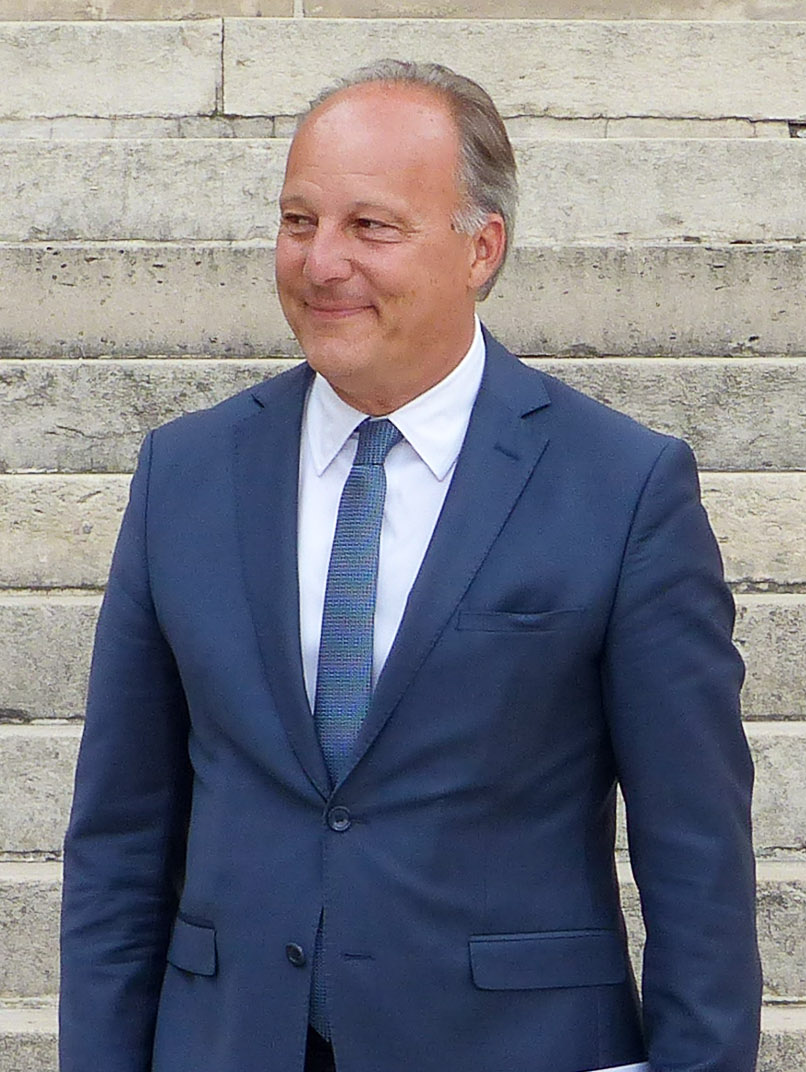

Member of the National Assembly for Alpes-Maritimes's 3rd constituency
- Incumbent
- Assumed office 8 July 2024
- Preceded by: Philippe Pradal

Personal details
- Born: 6 January 1965 (age 61) Nice, France
- Party: Union of the Right for the Republic (2024–present)
- Other political affiliations: The Republicans (2020–2024)

Bernard Chaix (French pronunciation: [bɛʁnaʁ ʃɛks]; born 6 January 1965) is a French businessman and politician who has represented the 3rd constituency of the Alpes-Maritimes department in the National Assembly since 2024. A former member of The Republicans (LR), which he left to join the newly-founded Union of the Right for the Republic (UDR) in 2024, he has also held a seat in the Departmental Council of Alpes-Maritimes for the canton of Nice-8 since 2021.

Chaix started his political career as a municipal councillor of Nice in 2020, a seat he held until his resignation in 2024. He was appointed treasurer of the UDR in 2024.
