= Auribeau-sur-Siagne =

Commune in Provence-Alpes-Côte d'Azur, France

Auribeau-sur-Siagne Auribèu de Sianha (Occitan) Auribello (Italian)
- Commune
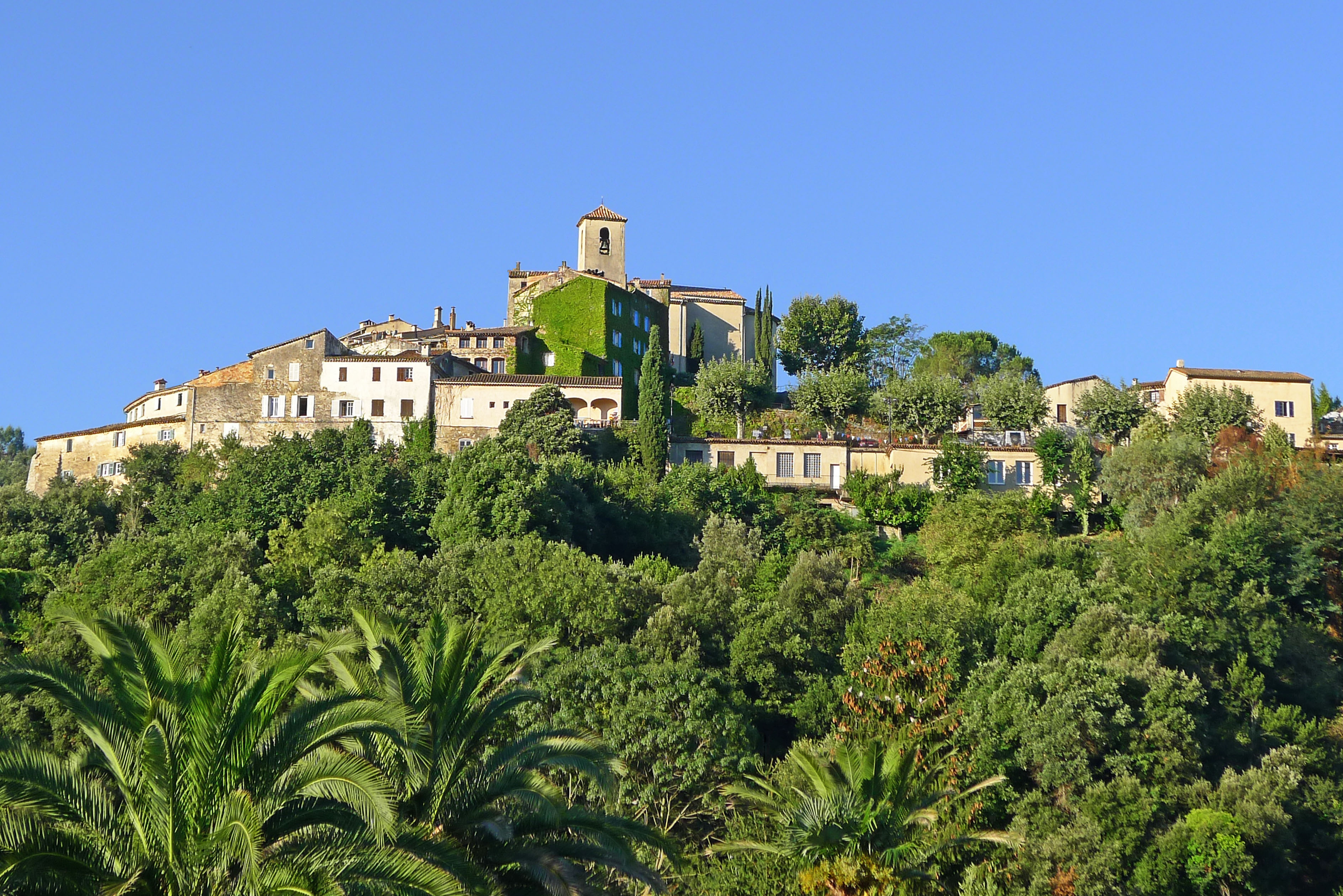
- View of the village from the Chemin de Pierrenchon

- Coat of arms
- Location of Auribeau-sur-Siagne
- Location within France Location within Provence-Alpes-Côte d'Azur
- Coordinates: 43°36′06″N 6°54′42″E
- Country: France
- Region: Provence-Alpes-Côte d'Azur
- Department: Alpes-Maritimes
- Arrondissement: Grasse
- Canton: Mandelieu-la-Napoule
- Intercommunality: Pays de Grasse

Government
  - Mayor (2026–32): Florent Rossi
- Area^{1}: 5.48 km^{2} (2.12 sq mi)
- Highest elevation: 302 m (991 ft)
- Lowest elevation: 12 m (39 ft)
- Population (2023): 3,401
  - Density: 621/km^{2} (1,610/sq mi)
- Time zone: UTC+01:00 (CET)
  - Summer (DST): UTC+02:00 (CEST)
- INSEE/Postal code: 06007 /06810
- ^{1} French Land Register data, which excludes lakes, ponds, glaciers > 1 km^{2} (0.386 sq mi or 247 acres) and river estuaries.

Auribeau-sur-Siagne (French pronunciation: [oʁibo syʁ sjaɲ], literally Auribeau on Siagne; Occitan: Auribèu de Sianha; Italian: Auribello) is a commune in the Alpes-Maritimes department in the Provence-Alpes-Côte d'Azur region of south-eastern France.

== Geography ==
Auribeau-sur-Siagne is a medieval village dating from the 11th century located some 10 km north-west of Cannes and 6 km south-west of Grasse. Perched on a rocky spur, the village overlooks the Siagne river. Access to the commune is by road D9 from Pégomas in the south-east which passes north through the eastern part of the commune and continues to Grasse in the north. The village, which is in the south of the commune, is accessed by local roads. The commune is served by the Sillages bus network Route 29 (Pégomas - Grasse) that has nine trips per day on weekdays. There are extensive residential urban areas in the commune with the areas of Le Gabre, Les Vayoux, Le Moulin Vieux, Carel, and Le Couloubrier. The rest of the commune is forested with a few small patches of farmland.

The Siagne river forms the south-western border of the commune with several tributaries flowing south through the commune to join it, the largest being the Riou.

== History ==
Auribeau is one of the many hilltop villages in Alpes-Maritimes built to enable the population to protect themselves against external aggressors. The earliest traces of human occupation are an Oppidum located at the top of mount Peygros, built around 600BC by the Celto-Ligurian people.

The Roman army defeated the Ligurian tribes in 155BC, but it was only after the victory of the emperor Augustus in 14 BC that Rome was able to continue the Via Aurelia as the Via Julia Augusta within Alpes-Maritimes along the Mediterranean coast up to Arles. At Mandelieu a secondary road split off to follow the Siagne up to Auribeau.

In an act of 1158, the pope confirmed ownership by the Bishops of Antibes of the fields and tithes of the churches of Auribeau, Pégomas, Notre-Dame-de-Valcluse and Mouans.

A text from 1242 reads "Auribeau church and castle" which indicates that the village existed at that time. The population of the village was decimated in the middle of the 14th century in the wake of war and the Black Plague. The raids by Raymond de Turenne continued to devastate the region until 1399. A text from 1400 describes the place as deserted, "castle completely destroyed near the church of Our Lady which is now open to the skies and partially destroyed."

In an agreement dated 5 June 1497 the Bishop of Grasse, Jean-André Grimaldi requested the people of the dioceses of Albenga and Ventimiglia to rebuild those houses within the village boundary. Therefore, the village that we see today dates from the 16th century. The church however, which is located outside the village walls, dates from the 17th century. In the 16th century the Siagne river was navigable between Auribeau and Mandelieu and served as a transportation route.

In 1692, commune residents opposed the requisitioning of workers to build the fortifications at Antibes. In 1707, during the War of Spanish Succession, the village was invaded and sacked by the French and Austro-Sardinian armies. In 1720 the Plague of Marseille led to the closure of the village, although access was still possible via an entry point put in place during the construction of the church (outside the village walls) in 1717. In 1765 Auribeau had 560 inhabitants.

=== Heraldry ===
Arms of Auribeau-sur-Siagne	Blazon: Argent, in base Vert, overall surmounted by Saint Antony clothed and haloed in Or, a band of hair and apron in Sable bearded in Argent, in his hands a book open the same.

== Administration ==
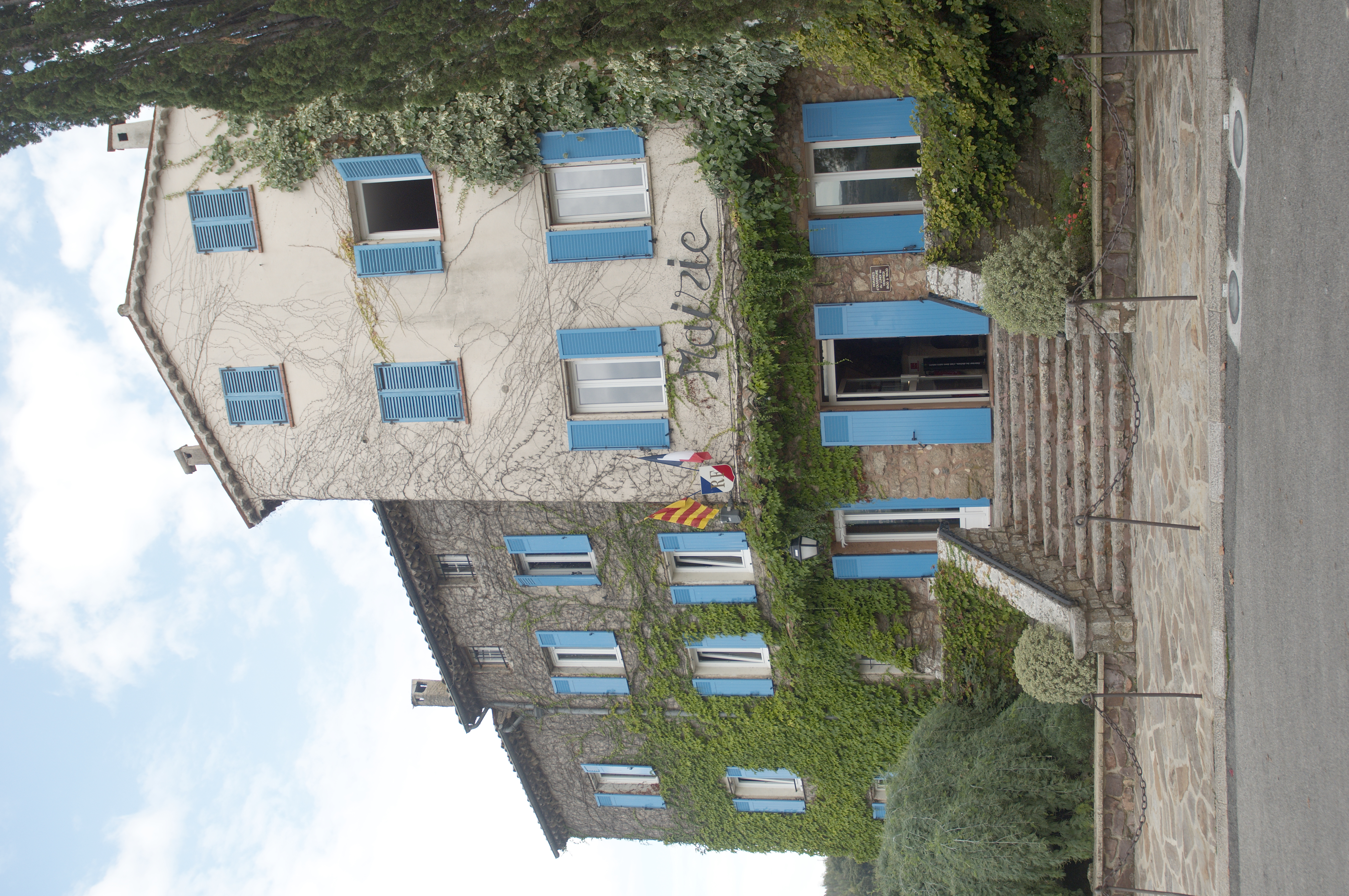
The Town Hall at Auribeau-sur-Siagne

The number of inhabitants at the last census was between 2500 and 3499 so the number of members of the municipal council is 23.

List of Successive Mayors

From	To	Name	Party
1983	2020	Jacques Varonne	UMP then LR
2020	2026	Michèle Paganin	LR
2026	incumbent	Florent Rossi	

=== Judicial and administrative proceedings ===
Auribeau-sur-Siagne falls within the area of the Tribunal d'instance (District court) of Grasse, the Tribunal de grande instance (High Court) of Grasse, the Cour d'appel (Appeal court) of Aix-en-Provence, the Tribunal pour enfants (Juvenile court) of Grasse, the Conseil de prud'hommes (Labour Court) of Grasse, the Tribunal de commerce (Commercial Court) of Grasse, the Tribunal administratif (Administrative tribunal) of Nice, and the Cour administrative d'appel (Administrative Court of Appeal) of Marseille.

=== Urban planning ===
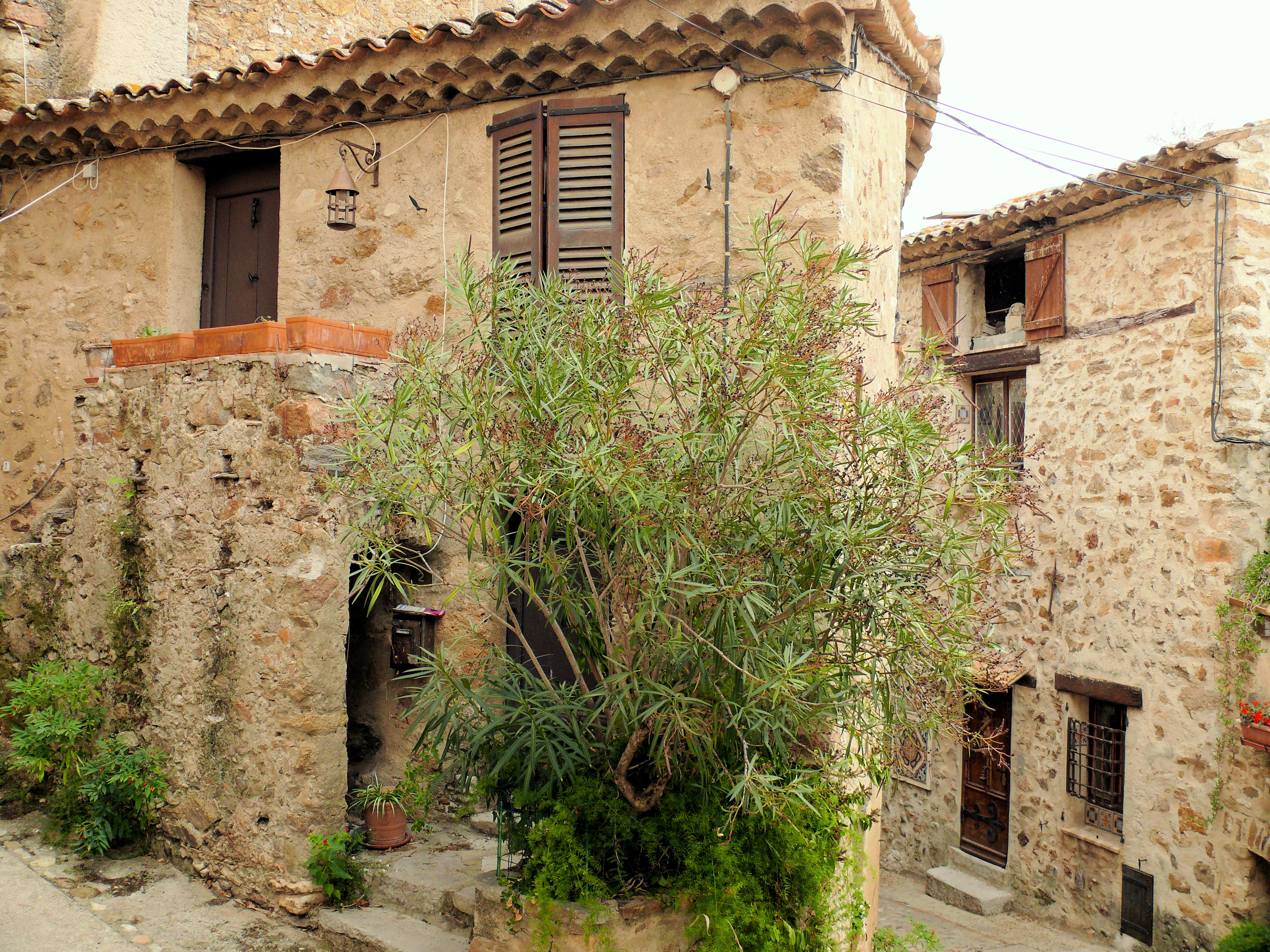
The Old Village

In 2017, the total number of dwellings in the commune was 1,490, compared to 1,212 in 1999. Of these units 81.4% were primary residences, second homes were 11.5% and 7.1% was vacant housing. 79.1% of these units were single-family houses and 19.7% were apartments. The proportion of main residences owned by their occupants was 77.2%.

== Population ==
The inhabitants of the commune are known as Auribélois or Auribéloises in French.

Historical population
Year	Pop.	±% p.a.
1968	767	—
1975	950	+3.10%
1982	1,154	+2.82%
1990	2,072	+7.59%
1999	2,612	+2.61%
2007	2,760	+0.69%
2012	3,049	+2.01%
2017	3,249	+1.28%
2023	3,401	+0.76%
Source: INSEE

== Economy ==
=== Employment ===
In 2017, the active population amounted to 1,610 people, including 161 unemployed. These workers are in majority employees (76%), and are in majority employed outside the commune (84%).

In 2017, there were 356 paid jobs in the area of employment against 317 in 2007 with employable people residing in the zone at 1,483. The concentration indicator (Note: This indicator is the number of jobs in the area per 100 employed workers as defined by Insee.) was 24.0%, which indicates that the area provides employment for only a quarter of the available workers.

=== Businesses and shops ===
On 31 December 2015 there were 361 businesses in Auribeau-sur-Siagne: 5 in agriculture-forestry-fishing, 10 in industry, 68 in construction, 238 in trades, transport, and services, and 40 were related to the public sector.

In 2018 51 new businesses were created in Auribeau-sur-Siagne, of which 39 Sole proprietorships.

== Culture and heritage ==
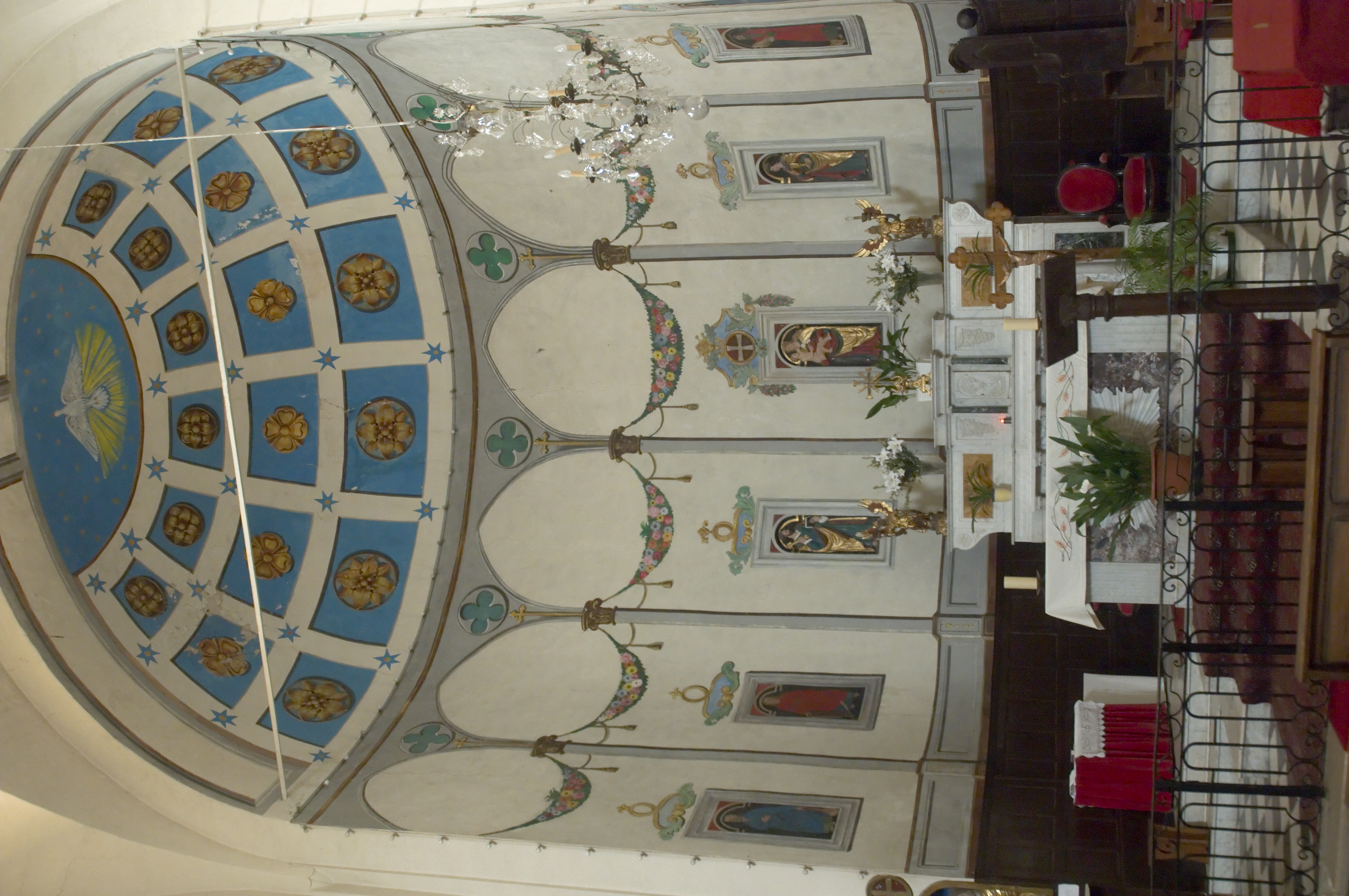
The Altar of the Chapel

=== Sites and Monuments ===
The Shrine of Our Lady of Valcluse is one of the busiest regional sanctuaries. It is located in the Diocese of Nice. Le Vivier is a stream which crosses the sanctuary and helps to maintain the abundant greenery adorning the sanctuary with the noise from waterfalls.

The sanctuary is mentioned in a text dated 24 November 1158: Pope Adrian IV listed the Church of Valcluse among the domains of the Bishop of Antibes, Raymond I. Another text dated 24 and 26 November 1258 indicated that the church was dedicated to Our Lady: super ecclesiam Beate maria de Valle Clusa....

The present chapel dates from 1650. In 1950 the statue of the Virgin was crowned by Cardinal Clément Roques, Archbishop of Rennes, and Monseigneur Paul Rémond, Bishop of Nice. It has beautified the chapel following a vow made on 20 August 1944 to do this if the region was spared from the Second World War.

In 1986 the Sisters of St. Joseph of Puy were hosts at the chapel followed in 1995 by members of the Community of the Beatitudes.

The chapel contains three items which are registered as historical objects:

- A Collection Plate depicting Ciceron (16th century)
- A Chalice (1563)
- A Reliquary (15th century)

=== Picture Gallery ===
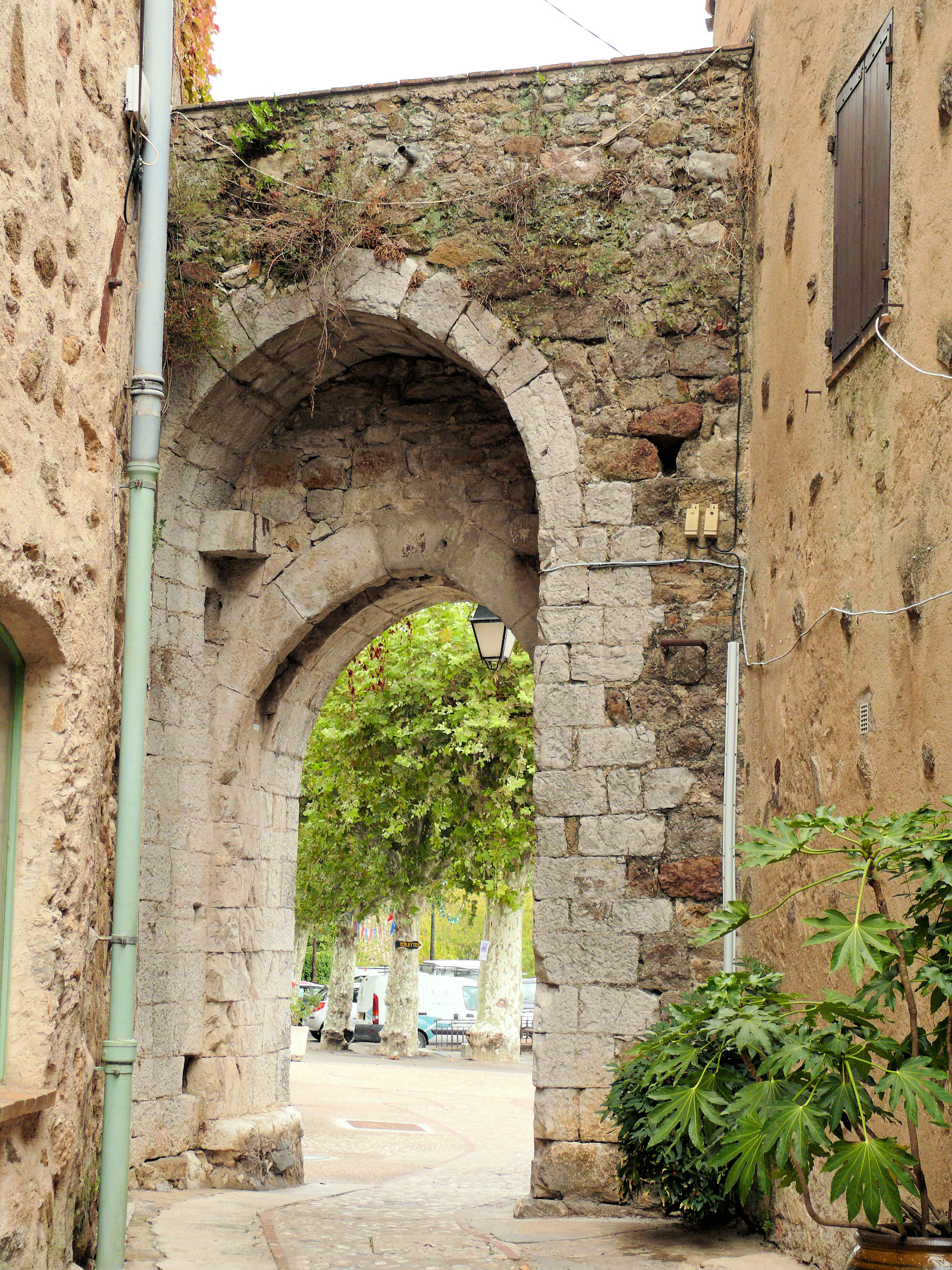
Old Village - Porte Soubran

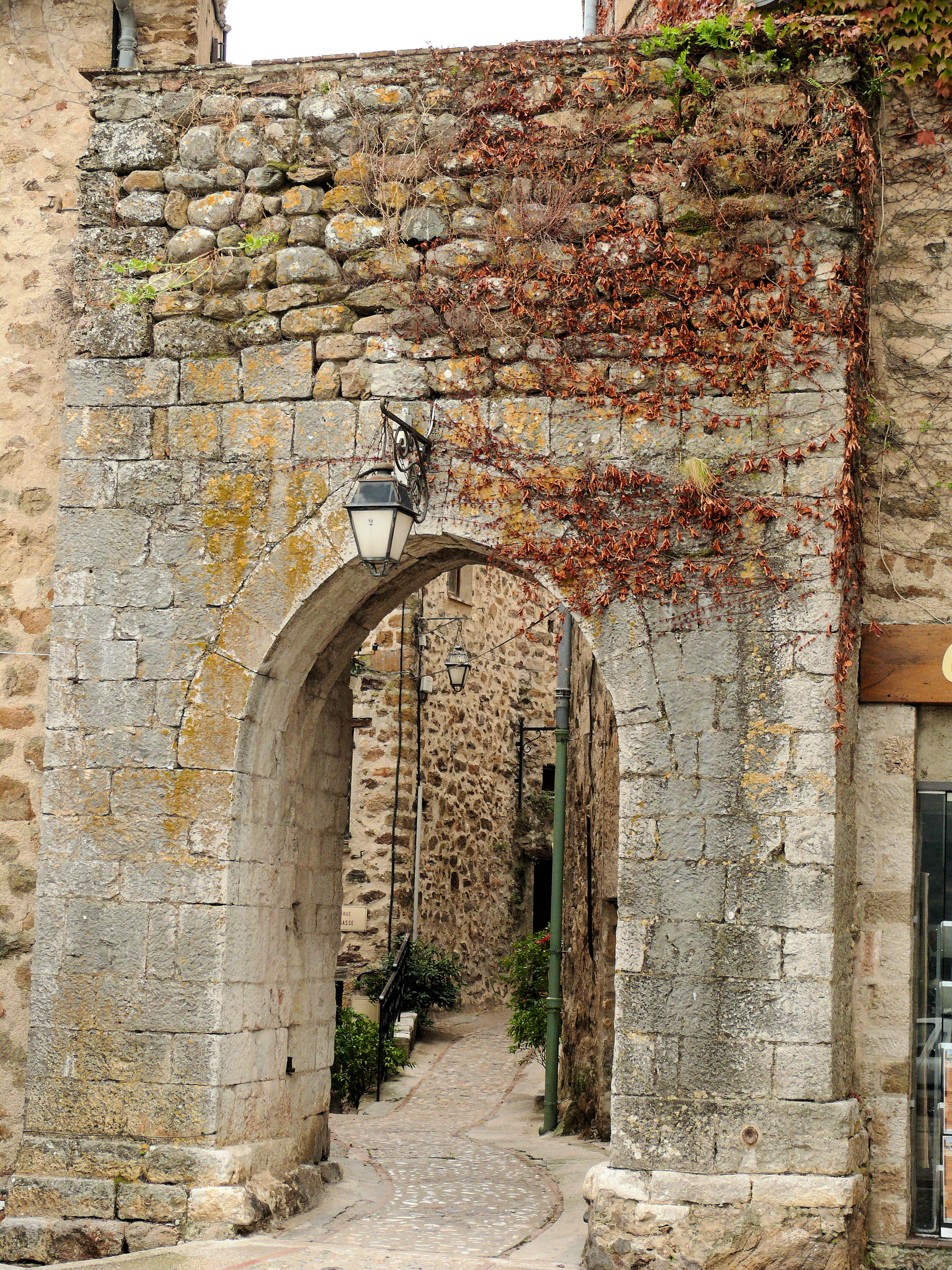
Old Village - Porte Soubran, outside

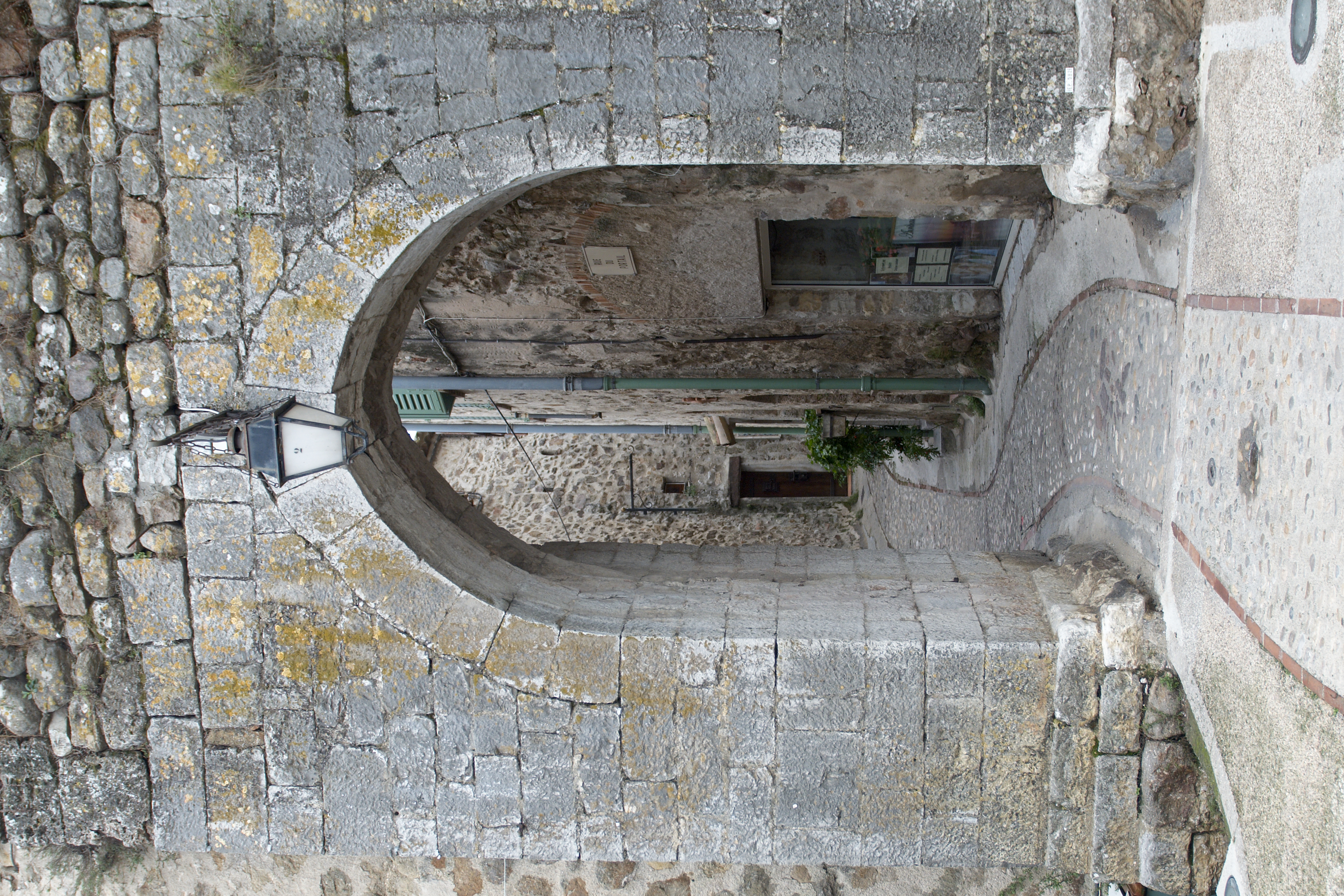
Gate to the Old Village

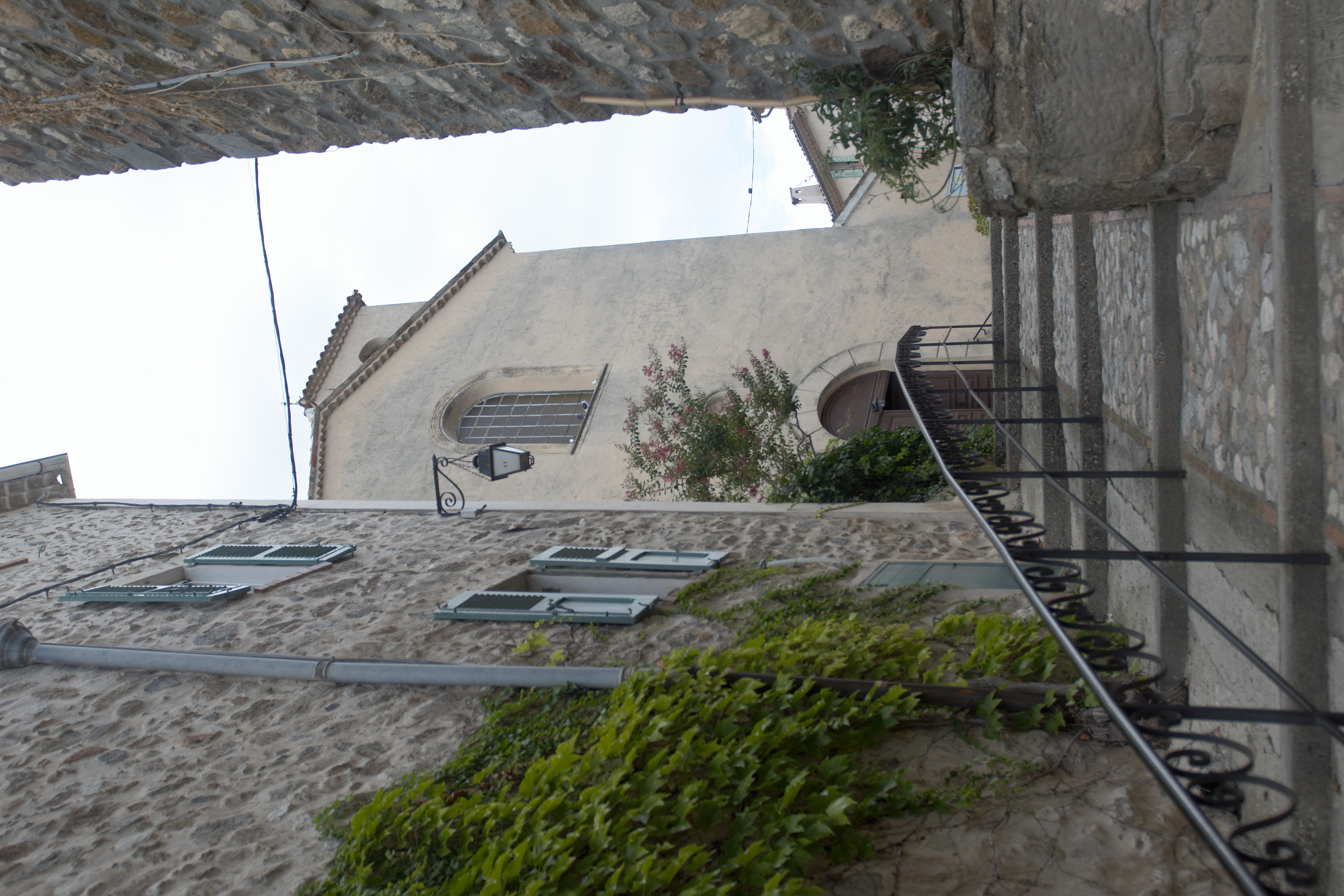
Steps to the CHurch

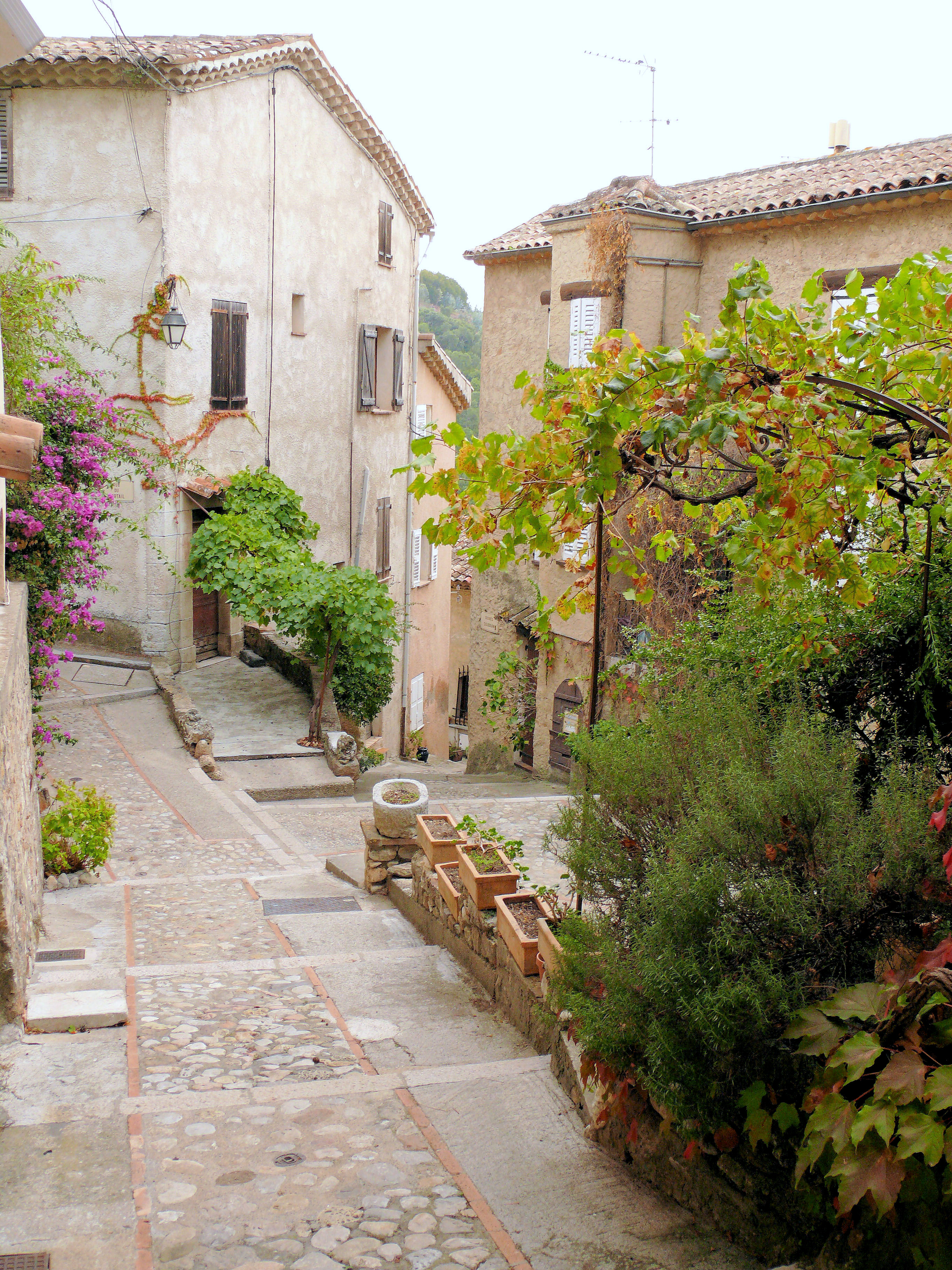
Old Village - Rouelles

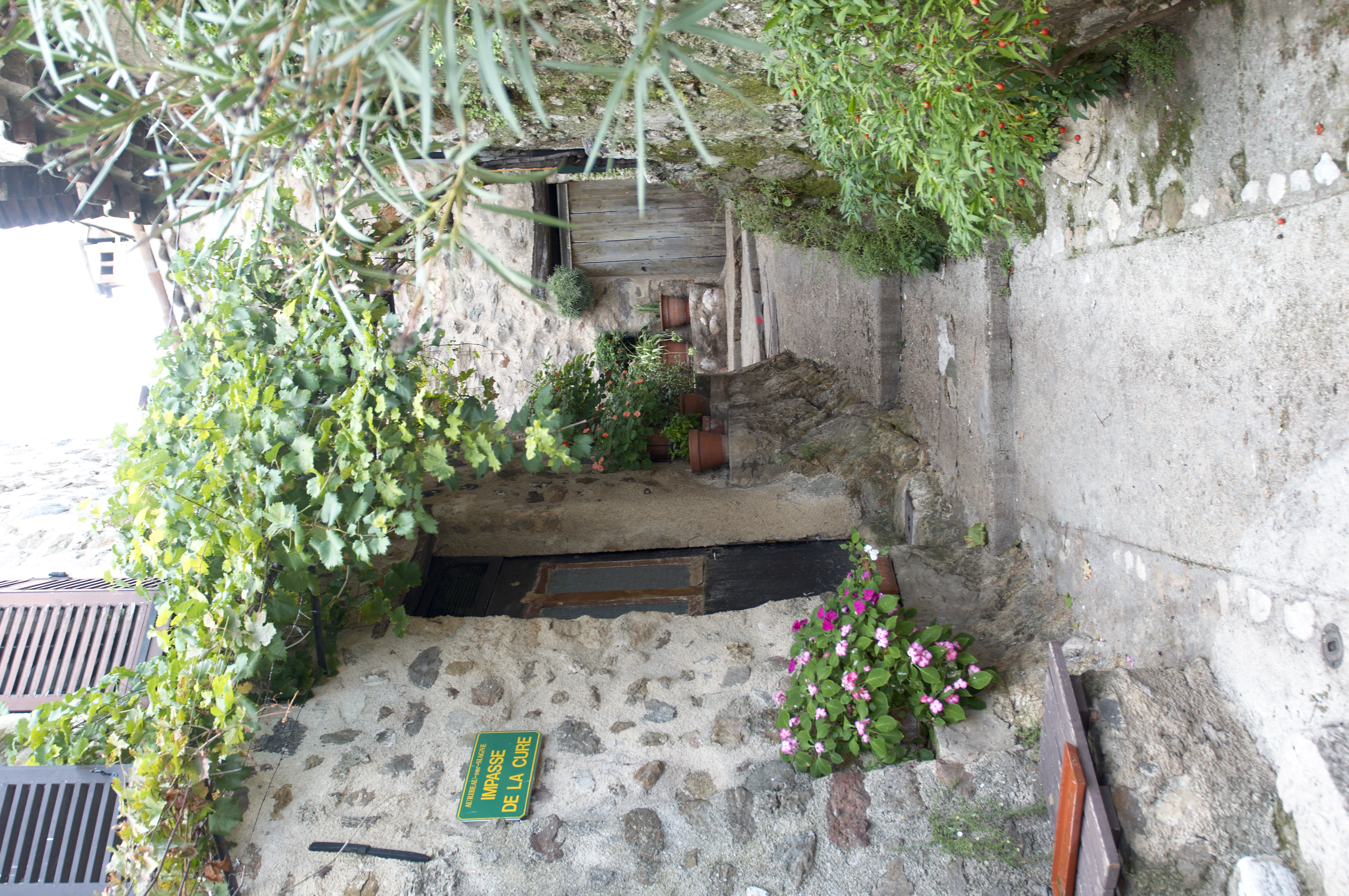
Old Village - Impasse de la Cure

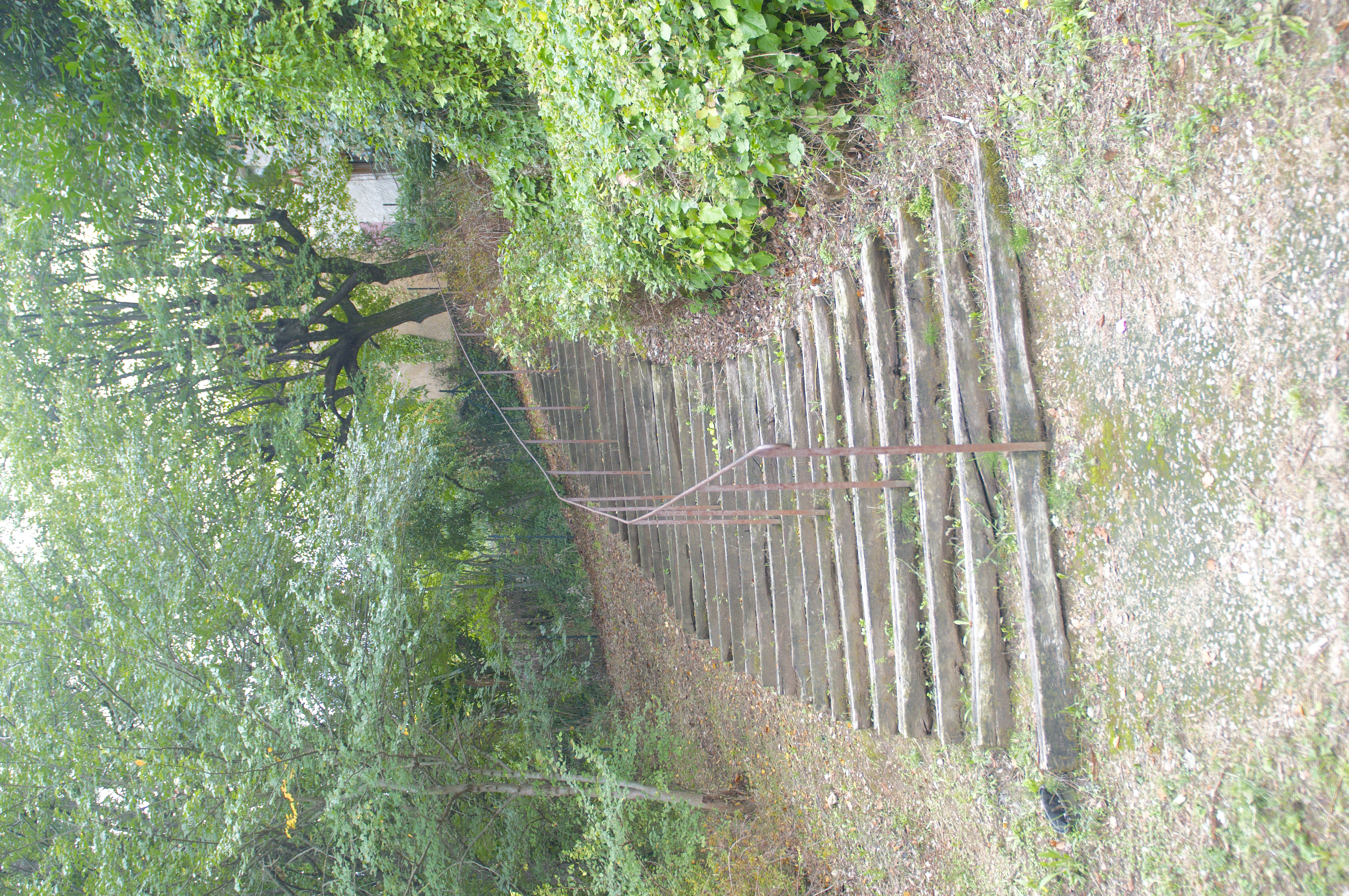
The GR51 in the commune

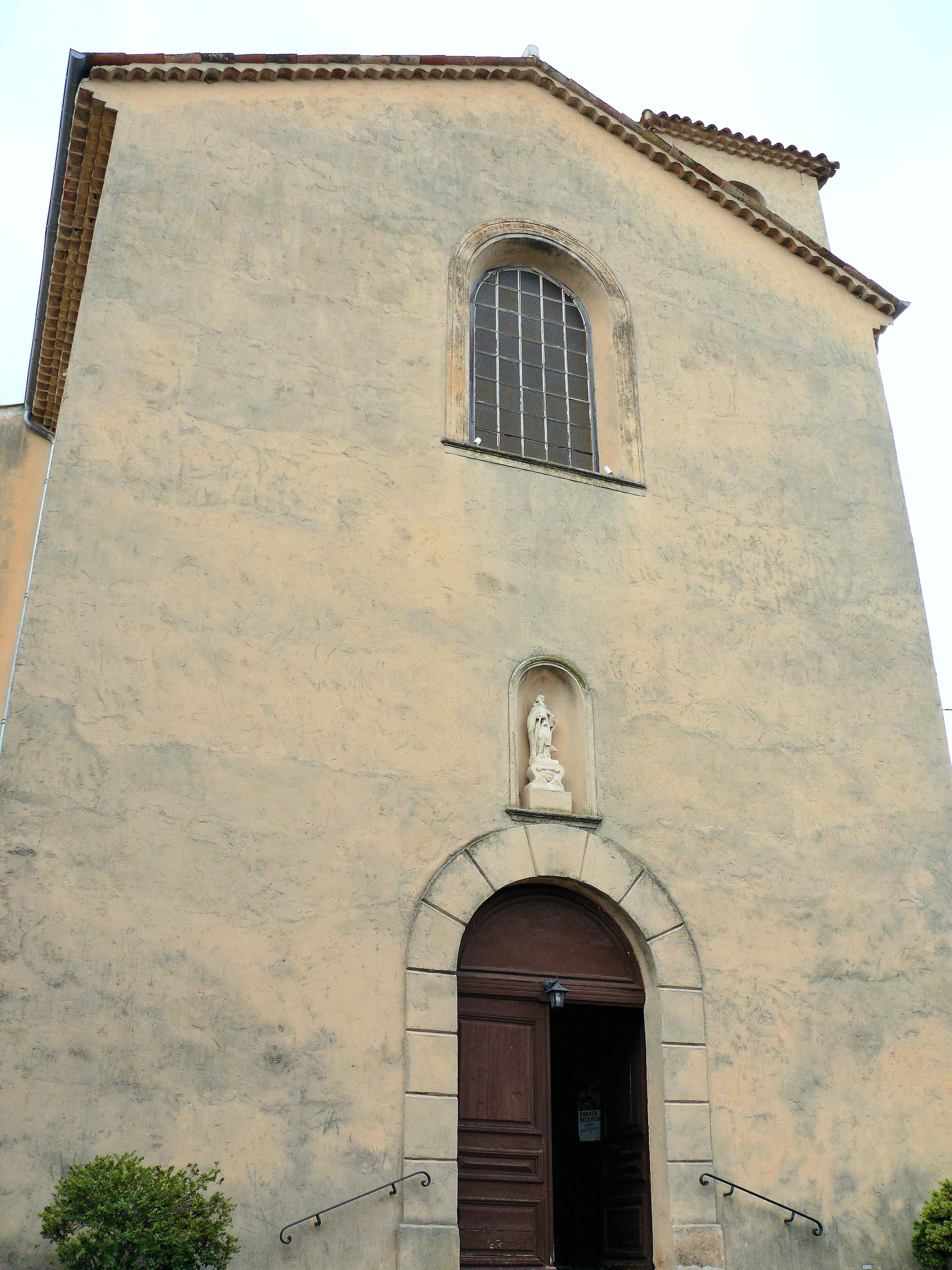
Facade of the Church

== Education ==
The commune is located in the area of the Academy of Nice. There is a nursery school with 127 pupils in 2012-2013 and an elementary school with 189 pupils.

== Cultural events and festivals ==
Since 2012 there has been an annual Theatre Festival called Auribeau-sur-Scène to celebrate the living arts (classical and contemporary theatre, ambulatory theatre, children's shows, etc.) and highlighting the heritage of the commune.

== Notable people linked to the commune ==
- Joseph Grégoire Casy (1787-1862), soldier and politician, born in Auribeau-sur-Siagne on 8 October 1787.
- P. G. Wodehouse (1881-1975), English writer, spent a year living in Auribeau-sur-Siagne between 1931 and 1932.

== See also ==
- Communes of the Alpes-Maritimes department
- The Siagne river

=== Bibliography ===
- Yves Bernard, Tourist and Cultural Annual of Alpes-Maritimes and the Principality of Monaco, p. 19, Éditions Campanile, 1997, ISBN 2912366-003
