= Raybaud =

Raybaud is a surname. Notable people with the surname include:

- Antoine Raybaud (1934–2012), French poet and author
- Henri Raybaud (1879–1942), French sculptor
- Jean-François-Maxime Raybaud (1765–1894), French philhellene
- Joseph Raybaud (1904–1991), French politician
- Joseph André Raybaud (1787–1857), French politician
- Léon-Pierre Raybaud (1934–2024), French historian and politician
- Louis Maximin Raybaud (1760–1842), French politician
- Nanette Raybaud (born 1960), French alpinist
