= Léon-Pierre Raybaud =

French legal historian and politician (1934–2024)

Mayor of Levens
- In office 1991–1994
- Preceded by: Joseph Raybaud
- Succeeded by: Antoine Véran

Personal details
- Born: 3 May 1934 Nice, France
- Died: 3 March 2024 (aged 89)
- Party: Independent
- Education: Faculty of Law of Paris
- Occupation: Legal historian

Léon-Pierre Raybaud (3 May 1934 – 3 March 2024) was a French legal historian and politician who was an independent.

== Biography ==
Born in Nice on 3 May 1934, Raybaud was the son of Joseph Raybaud, who served in the Senate, was president of the General Council of Alpes-Maritimes, and mayor of Levens. He succeeded his father as mayor of Levens and was governor of district 1700 of Rotary International.

Raybaud earned his doctorate from the Faculty of Law of Paris in 1963. Afterwards, he became a professor of legal history at Toulouse Capitole University. He received the thesis prize from the Association des historiens des facultés de droit in 1964.

Léon-Pierre Raybaud died on 3 March 2024, at the age of 89.

== Publications ==
- Essai sur le Sénat de Constantinople : des origines au règne de Léon VI le Sage (1963)
- Papauté et pouvoir temporel sous les pontificats de Clément XII et Benoît XIV (1730-1758) (1963)
- Le prince dans la France des XVIe et XVIIe siècles (1965)
- Le gouvernement et l'administration centrale de l'empire byzantin sous les premiers Paléologues (1258-1354) (1968)
- Champfleury entre l'étrange et le réel : essai sur son évolution littéraire (1990)
