= Joseph Grégoire Casy =

French naval officer and politician

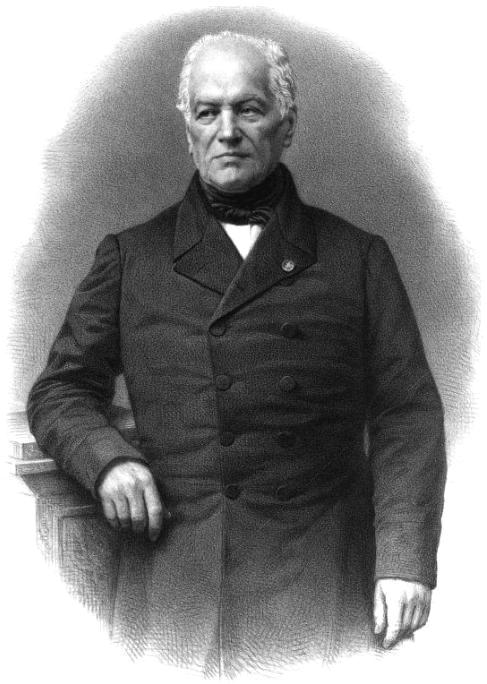
- Portrait from Panthéon des illustrations françaises au XIXe siècle (1869)
- Born: 8 October 1787; Auribeau-sur-Siagne, Alpes-Maritimes, France
- Died: 19 February 1862 (aged 74)
- Occupations: Naval officer and politician
- Known for: Minister of the Navy (1848)

Joseph Grégoire Casy (French pronunciation: [ʒozɛf ɡʁeɡwaʁ kazi]; 8 October 1787 – 19 February 1862) was a French naval officer and politician. He became a vice-admiral and a member of the Admiralty board, then entered a career in politics. He was elected a deputy of the Constituent Assembly in 1848, served briefly as Minister of the Navy, and became a senator in the Second French Empire in 1852.

== Napoleonic era ==
Joseph Grégoire Casy was born in Auribeau-sur-Siagne, Alpes-Maritimes, on 8 October 1787. His parents were Philippe Casy, a merchant, and Marianne Lambert. His parents planned that he would become a doctor. When Casy was 10 years old a squadron commanded by Admiral Pierre Martin came to anchor in Golfe-Juan. Casy and his schoolmates were taken on board the ship Ça ira. The boy at once decided that he would become a sailor. Two months later he ran away to Cannes to find a boat that would take him, but was soon found and brought back. His father realized that he was determined to go to sea, and made him study for a naval career.

Casy joined the navy in 1803 and became a midshipman on 8 October 1804. In 1805 he served on the frigate Pomone when it took Prince Jérôme Bonaparte to Algiers to reclaim Genovese slaves. He served on the Annibal in 1807 on the expedition to Corfu. When the Russian vessels Moscow and Saint Peter joined the French squadron, Admiral Honoré Joseph Antoine Ganteaume assigned him to serve under the Russian commander. Casy was appointed a sub-lieutenant on 12 July 1808.

He served under Admiral Julien Cosmao in operations off Barcelona and Tarragona and distinguished himself in the Mediterranean expedition of 1813. In 1813 he was detached to take 80 gunners to Cape Sepet, where they armed the batteries of Puy and Marduy. These batteries were attacked by English ships. They returned a fire so intense and well-directed that one of the ships had to be towed away.

== Restoration ==
Under the Bourbon Restoration Casy was made a lieutenant on 16 July 1816. He embarked as second-in-command of the corvette Rhinocéros and then the corvette Ciotad. In 1819 he was assigned to the Colosse, a 74-gun ship. That year he sailed on the Colosse in a group of ships under Rear Admiral Jurien dispatched to establish trade relations with the South American states. At the end of this long voyage he was made a knight of St. Louis. In 1821 he was transferred to the 46-gun Galathée in the Anglo-French squadron charged with watching the coasts of Africa.

Casy participated in the Spanish Civil War in 1823, blockading the coast of Catalonia on the frigate Junon. Casy then was made chief of staff to Rear-Admiral Claude Charles Marie du Campe de Rosamel. In the three-year campaign he served on board the Marie-Thérèse. He was appointed Knight of the Legion of Honour and attained the rank of Commander in April 1827. He published his book Extrait analytique de la tactique navale, an analysis of naval tactics, which was very well received. He took a few months leave, then embarked on the Breslau.

Casy took part in the expedition to Greece in 1828 where he assisted in the capture of Navarino, Koroni, Methoni and the forts of the Peloponnese. He was assigned the Trident, under Admiral Rosamel. After the evacuation of the Morea this vessel assisted expeditions to Algiers, Tripoli and Portugal. Admiral Hugon, commanding a division of five ships, chose the Trident as his flagship. Admiral Roussin, commander-in-chief of the Portugal expedition, complimented Casy on his handling of his vessel during the Battle of the Tagus.

== July Monarchy ==
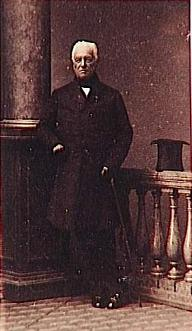
Casy in old age

Casy became a captain on 9 January 1831 after the July Revolution of 1830. He was assigned to the 52-gun Calypso (formerly the Marie-Thérèse) in 1832. From 1833 to 1836 he commanded the 80-gun Duquesne. He served in the Atlantic and the West Indies. From 1837 to 1838 he was captain of the 100-gun Hercule, where he instructed the king's son, François d'Orléans, Prince of Joinville, in naval matters.

Casy was promoted to rear admiral on 14 February 1839. Two years later he led an operational squadron. In 1841 he was appointed maritime prefect of Rochefort. On 17 December 1845 he was promoted to vice-admiral and made a member of the Admiralty Board.

== Political career ==
After the February Revolution of 1848, Casy ran for election on 23 April 1848 to represent Var, where he was maritime prefect, in the Constituent Assembly. He appeared to be a republican, and on 11 May 1848 the Executive Commission made him Minister of the Navy. He kept this post until General Louis-Eugène Cavaignac took office. At first Casy voted with the left, and was in favor of banishing the Orleans family. Later he moved towards the right, and on 7 October 1848 voted against the Grévy amendment.

Casy then requested leave from the Assembly and took command of the maritime district of Toulon. He helped with the preparations for the expedition to Rome. and declared himself in favor of Louis Napoleon. After the coup of 2 December 1851, he was appointed to the Senate on 26 January 1852. On 2 June 1852 he married Sophie Anne Louise Roy in Paris. He became a Grand Officer of the Legion of Honour and vice-chair of the Admiralty Board during the Second French Empire.

Joseph Grégoire Casy died in Paris on 19 February 1862.

== Works ==
- Casy, Joseph-Grégoire (1828). Extrait analytique de la tactique navale... A. Aurel.
- Casy, Joseph-Grégoire (1840). Organisation du personnel d'un vaisseau. Carilian-Goeury et V. Dalmont.
