= Rudy Salles =

French politician

Deputy for Alpes-Maritimes's 3rd constituency in the National Assembly of France
- In office 12 June 1988 – 20 June 2017
- Preceded by: none (proportional representation in 8th Legislature)
- Succeeded by: Cédric Roussel
- Parliamentary group: UDF, then NC

Councillor, Regional Council of Provence-Alpes-Côte d'Azur
- In office 17 March 1986 – 22 March 1992

Personal details
- Born: July 30, 1954 (age 71) Nice

Rudy Salles (born July 30, 1954 in Nice) was a member of the National Assembly of France from 1988 to 2017, representing the Alpes-Maritimes department, as a member of first the Union for French Democracy, then the New Centre.

In addition to his work in parliament, Salles served as member of the French delegation to the Parliamentary Assembly of the Council of Europe from 2002 until 2007 and again from 2010 until 2017. In this capacity, he was a full member of the Committee on Rules of Procedure, Immunities and Institutional Affairs as well as a substitute on the Committee on the Election of Judges to the European Court of Human Rights.
