= Timeline of Toulon =

The following is a timeline of the history of the city of Toulon, France.

== Prior to 20th century ==
- 5th C. – Catholic diocese of Toulon established.
- 1096 – Toulon Cathedral construction begins.
- 1259 – Charles of Anjou in power.
- 14th C. - Toulon coat of arms in use.
- 1524
  - Tour Royale, Toulon (fort) built.
  - Tour Royale seized by Charles V, Holy Roman Emperor.
- 1543/44 - Ottoman wintering in Toulon offered by Francis I of France.
- 1599 – Naval arsenal and shipyard built.
- 18th C. - Toulon Cathedral construction completed.
- 1707 – Battle of Toulon (1707).
- 1720 – Plague.
- 1738 – Porte du Musée de la Marine (Toulon) (gate) built.
- 1744 – February: Battle of Toulon fought near city.
- 1748 – Bagne of Toulon (prison) begins operating.
- 1788 – Saint Louis Church, Toulon built.
- 1790 – Toulon becomes part of the Var souveraineté.
- 1793 – Siege of Toulon. As a punishment, the Convention changes the name of the city to Port-la-Montagne,.
- 1800 – Société des Sciences, Belles-Lettres et Arts de Toulon founded.
- 1801 – Catholic diocese disestablished, per Concordat of 1801.
- 1806 – Population: 28,170.
- 1833 – Var Chamber of Commerce established.
- 1841 – Population: 45,449.
- 1846 – Population: 62,941.
- 1853 – Shipbuilder Société Nouvelle des Forges et Chantiers de la Méditerranée established in nearby La Seyne-sur-Mer.
- 1859 – Toulon station opens.
- 1862 – Toulon Opera hall opens on the Boulevard de Strasbourg (Toulon).
- 1873
  - République du Var newspaper begins publication.
  - Bagne of Toulon (prison) closes.
- 1879 – Le Petit Var newspaper begins publication.
- 1884 – Cholera epidemic.
- 1886
  - Tram begins operating.
  - Société de géographie de Toulon founded.
  - Population: 70,122.
- 1888 – Musée d'art de Toulon opens.
- 1890 – Fountain installed in the Place de la Liberté (Toulon).

== 20th century ==
=== 1900s–1940s ===
- 1901
  - Canton de Toulon-1, Canton de Toulon-2, Canton de Toulon-3, and Canton de Toulon-4 created.
  - Population: 101,602.
- 1908 – Société des sciences naturelles et d'archéologie de Toulon et du Var founded.
- 1911 – Population: 104,582.
- 1912 – Société des Amis du Vieux Toulon et de sa Région established.
- 1920 – Stade Mayol (stadium) opens.
- 1935 – August: Violent uprisings by shipyard workers against the government's restrictive austerity policy is resulting in a large number of deaths and injuries.
- 1936 – Population: 150,310.
- 1940 – 12–13 June: Bombing of Toulon by Italian forces.
- 1942 – 27 November: Scuttling of the French fleet in Toulon.
- 1944 – Sporting Toulon Var football club formed.
- 1948 – Bazeille apartment building constructed in Port Marchand.
- 1949 – Toulon trolleybus begins operating.

=== 1950s–1990s ===
- 1950 – 12 February: Communist demonstration.
- 1957 – Lycée Dumont-d'Urville (Toulon) (school) founded.
- 1959 – Maurice Arreckx becomes mayor.
- 1961 – Musée des arts asiatiques de Toulon opens.
- 1964
  - A57 autoroute opens.
  - Canton de Toulon-5 created.
- 1966 – Toulon–Hyères Airport opens.
- 1967 – Toulon Tournament of football begins.
- 1968 - University of Toulon founded.
- 1970 - Hôtel de Ville completed.
- 1973
  - August: Racial unrest.
  - Canton de Toulon-6, Canton de Toulon-7, Canton de Toulon-8, and Canton de Toulon-9 created.
- 1975 – Population: 181,801.
- 1979 – University of the South, Toulon-Var established.
- 1980 – Toulon Book Fair begins.
- 1982 – Toulon becomes part of the Provence-Alpes-Côte d'Azur region.
- 1986 – March: Provence-Alpes-Côte d'Azur regional election, 1986 held.
- 1989 – 15 February: Maison des Têtes de Toulon explosion occurs.
- 1990 – Population: 167,619.
- 1992 – 16 December: Toulon bank robbery occurs.
- 1995 – Jean-Marie Le Chevallier becomes mayor.
- 1997 – Fête du livre du Var (book fair) begins.

== 21st century ==
- 2001 – Hubert Falco becomes mayor.
- 2002
  - Toulon tunnel opens on the A50 autoroute.
  - Conservatoire à rayonnement régional de Toulon (school) established.
- 2003
  - Regional Réseau Mistral bus begins operating.
  - Mosque established.
- 2006 – Palais des Sports de Toulon opens.
- 2010 – June: 2010 Var floods occur in vicinity of Toulon.
- 2011
  - Théâtre Liberté opens.
  - Population: 163,974.
- 2014 – 23 March: Toulon municipal election, 2014 held.
- 2015 – December: 2015 Provence-Alpes-Côte d'Azur regional election held.

== See also ==
- Toulon history
- History of Toulon
- List of mayors of Toulon
- List of historic sites in Var
- History of Var department
- History of Provence region
- Timeline of Provence

Other cities in the Provence-Alpes-Côte d'Azur region:

- Timeline of Aix-en-Provence
- Timeline of Arles
- Timeline of Avignon
- Timeline of Marseille
- Timeline of Nice

== Bibliography ==
=== in English ===
- Clement Cruttwell (1793). "Toulon". Gazetteer of France. London: G.G.J. and J. Robinson. hdl:2027/njp.32101072026824.
- Abraham Rees (1819), "Toulon", The Cyclopaedia, London: Longman, Hurst, Rees, Orme & Brown, hdl:2027/mdp.39015068382954
- "Toulon", Handbook for Travellers in France, London: John Murray, 1861
- William Henry Overall, ed. (1870). "Toulon". Dictionary of Chronology. London: William Tegg. hdl:2027/uc2.ark:/13960/t9m32q949.
- C. B. Black (1896), "Toulon", The Riviera (9th ed.), London: Adam & Charles Black
- "Toulon". Chambers's Encyclopaedia. London. 1901. hdl:2027/uc2.ark:/13960/t56d64f6t.
- Hannay, David McDowall (1910). "Toulon" . Encyclopædia Britannica. Vol. 27 (11th ed.). pp. 98–99.
- Benjamin Vincent (1910), "Toulon", Haydn's Dictionary of Dates (25th ed.), London: Ward, Lock & Co., hdl:2027/loc.ark:/13960/t89g6g776
- "Toulon", Southern France (6th ed.), Leipzig: Baedeker, 1914
- Daniel C. Haskell, ed. (1922), "Provencal literature and language, including the local history of southern France", Bulletin of the New York Public Library, vol. 26, hdl:2027/mdp.39015035117657, "Local history: Toulon"
- Malcolm Crook (1991). Toulon in War and Revolution: From the Ancien Régime to the Restoration, 1750–1820. Manchester University Press. ISBN 978-0-7190-3567-8.

=== in French ===
- Eusèbe Girault de Saint-Fargeau [in French] (1850). "Toulon". Guide pittoresque: portatif et complet, du voyageur en France (in French) (3rd ed.). Paris: Firmin Didot frères. p. 665. hdl:2027/uiug.30112081968700.
- Octave Teissier [in French] (1869). Histoire de Toulon au moyen âge (in French). Paris.
- "Toulon". Provence. Guides Joanne (in French). 1906. hdl:2027/uc1.$b192331.
- "Toulon". Dictionnaire Bouillet (in French) (34th ed.). Hachette. 1914. hdl:2027/mdp.39015074817142.
