= Cédric Roussel (politician) =

French politician

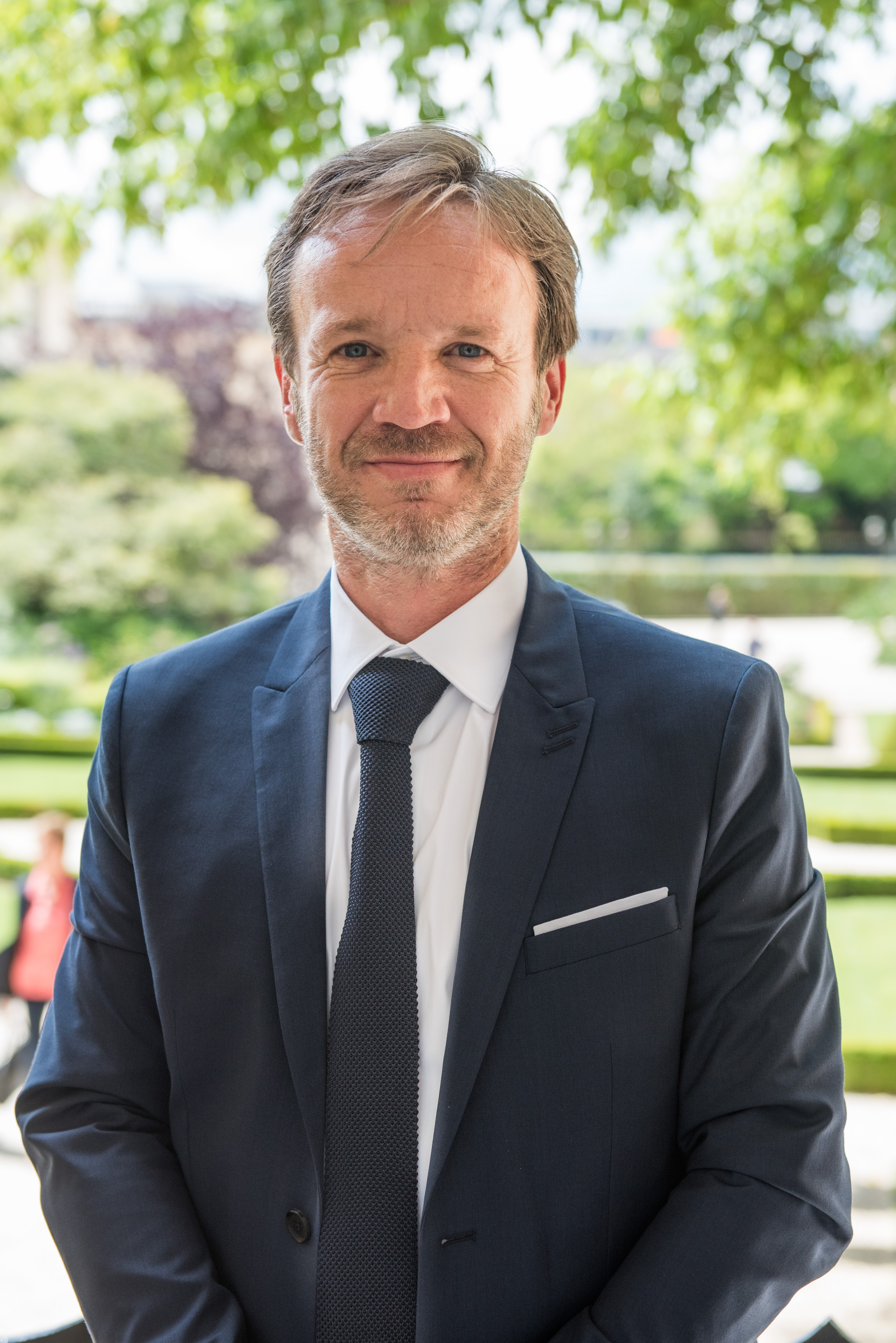
- Cédric Roussel in 2017

Member of the National Assembly for Alpes-Maritimes's 3rd constituency
- In office 21 June 2017 – 21 June 2022
- Preceded by: Rudy Salles
- Succeeded by: Philippe Pradal

Personal details
- Born: 10 October 1972 (age 53) Brest, France
- Party: En Marche!
- Education: IAE Nice
- Profession: Financial adviser

Cédric Roussel (born 10 October 1972) is a French politician representing La République En Marche! He was the deputy for Alpes-Maritimes's 3rd constituency in the French National Assembly from 21 June 2017 to 21 June 2022.

In parliament, Roussel serves as member of the Committee on Cultural Affairs and Education. In addition to his committee assignments, he is part of the parliamentary friendship groups with Italy, South Korea and Russia.

== See also ==
- 2017 French legislative election
