= Philippe Pradal =

French politician

Member of the National Assembly for Alpes-Maritimes's 3rd constituency
- In office 22 June 2022 – 9 June 2024
- Preceded by: Cédric Roussel
- Succeeded by: Bernard Chaix

Mayor of Nice
- In office 13 June 2016 – 15 May 2017
- Preceded by: Christian Estrosi
- Succeeded by: Christian Estrosi

Deputy Mayor of Nice
- In office 3 September 2013 – 13 June 2016
- Preceded by: Benoît Kandel
- Succeeded by: Christian Estrosi

Personal details
- Born: 1 February 1963 (age 63) Nice, France
- Party: The Republicans; Horizons
- Children: 1

Philippe Pradal (born 1 February 1963) is a French politician. He was first deputy mayor of Nice from 2013 to 2016. He served as Mayor of Nice from 2016 to 2017. He supported Nicolas Sarkozy for The Republicans presidential primary in 2016. He is currently a member of the Horizons party.

== Biography ==
Philippe Pradal was born in Nice, France in 1963. He has one daughter. He was in e position on the list of outgoing mayor in 2014. He appeared in 37th position on the list of Christian Estrosi in 2008.

In June 2022, he was elected to serve as Deputy for the Alpes-Maritimes's 3rd constituency in the National Assembly.

He received the Knights of the Legion of Honor in July 2017.

Political offices
Preceded by Christian Estrosi	Mayor of Nice; 13 June 2016 – 15 May 2017	Succeeded by Christian Estrosi
Preceded by Benoît Kandel	First Deputy Mayor of Nice; 3 September 2013 – 13 June 2016	Succeeded by Christian Estrosi
