= Saint-André-de-la-Roche =

Commune in Provence-Alpes-Côte d'Azur, France

- Commune
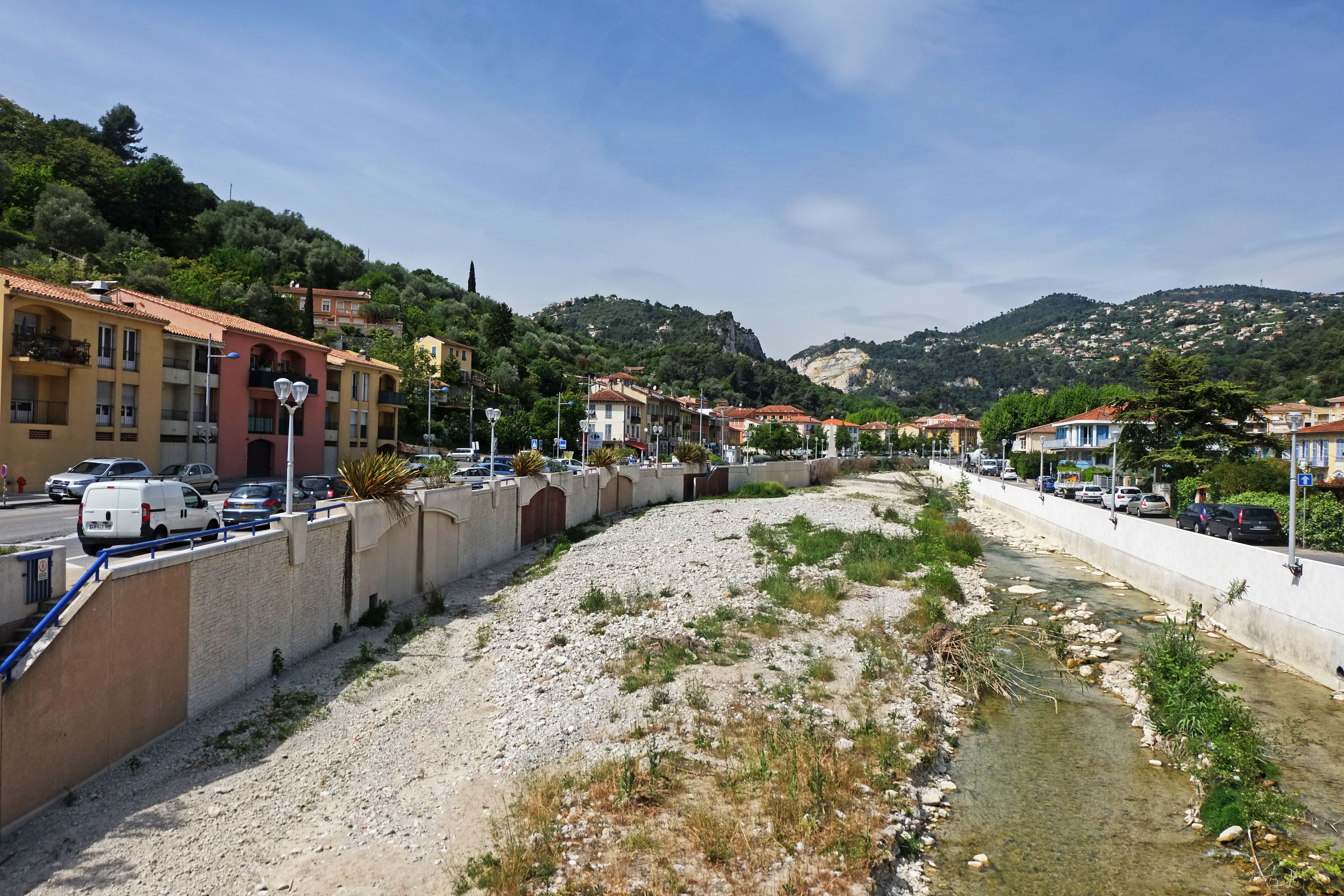
- A view of the river flowing through the village

- Coat of arms
- Location of Saint-André-de-la-Roche
- Location within France Location within Provence-Alpes-Côte d'Azur
- Coordinates: 43°44′28″N 7°17′18″E
- Country: France
- Region: Provence-Alpes-Côte d'Azur
- Department: Alpes-Maritimes
- Arrondissement: Nice
- Canton: Nice-7
- Intercommunality: Métropole Nice Côte d'Azur

Government
  - Mayor (2026–32): Jean-Jacques Carlin
- Area^{1}: 2.86 km^{2} (1.10 sq mi)
- Elevation: 62 m (203 ft)
- Highest elevation: 383 m (1,257 ft)
- Lowest elevation: 43 m (141 ft)
- Population (2023): 5,896
  - Density: 2,060/km^{2} (5,340/sq mi)
- Demonym: Saint-Andréens
- Time zone: UTC+01:00 (CET)
  - Summer (DST): UTC+02:00 (CEST)
- INSEE/Postal code: 06114 /06730
- ^{1} French Land Register data, which excludes lakes, ponds, glaciers > 1 km^{2} (0.386 sq mi or 247 acres) and river estuaries.

Saint-André-de-la-Roche (French pronunciation: [sɛ̃.t‿ɑ̃dʁe də la ʁɔʃ]; Occitan: Sant Andrieu de la Ròca; Italian: Sant'Andrea di Nizza, before 2001: Saint-André) is a commune in the Alpes-Maritimes department in southeastern France.

Until the 50s, in this small city there was a mountain with the shape of a steppe-pyramid, similar to ancient pyramids from old civilizations. The pyramid was demolished 70 years ago to build a car-road.

== Population ==
Historical population
Year	Pop.	±% p.a.
1968	2,006	—
1975	4,397	+11.86%
1982	4,264	−0.44%
1990	4,151	−0.34%
1999	4,122	−0.08%
2007	4,701	+1.66%
2012	5,346	+2.60%
2017	5,458	+0.42%
2023	5,896	+1.29%
Source: INSEE

== See also ==
- Communes of the Alpes-Maritimes department
