= Mouans-Sartoux =

Commune in Provence-Alpes-Côte d'Azur, France

- Commune
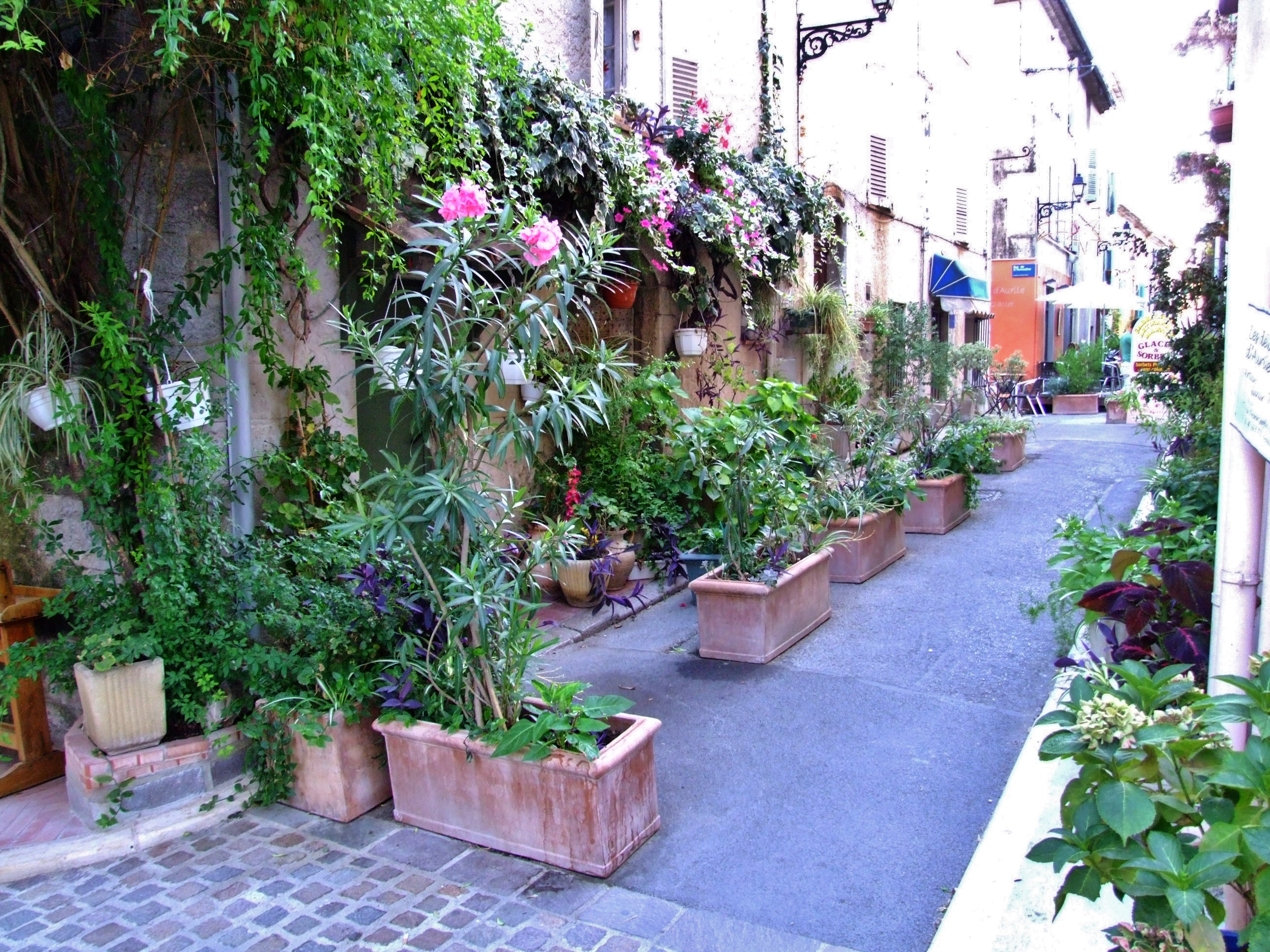
- A street in Mouans-Sartoux

- Coat of arms
- Location of Mouans-Sartoux
- Location within France Location within Provence-Alpes-Côte d'Azur
- Coordinates: 43°37′16″N 6°58′21″E
- Country: France
- Region: Provence-Alpes-Côte d'Azur
- Department: Alpes-Maritimes
- Arrondissement: Grasse
- Canton: Grasse-2
- Intercommunality: CA Pays de Grasse

Government
  - Mayor (2026–32): Pierre Aschieri
- Area^{1}: 13.52 km^{2} (5.22 sq mi)
- Elevation: 173 m (568 ft)
- Highest elevation: 321 m (1,053 ft)
- Lowest elevation: 40 m (130 ft)
- Population (2023): 11,015
  - Density: 814.7/km^{2} (2,110/sq mi)
- Demonym: Mouansois
- Time zone: UTC+01:00 (CET)
  - Summer (DST): UTC+02:00 (CEST)
- INSEE/Postal code: 06084 /06370
- ^{1} French Land Register data, which excludes lakes, ponds, glaciers > 1 km^{2} (0.386 sq mi or 247 acres) and river estuaries.

Mouans-Sartoux (French pronunciation: [mwɑ̃ saʁtu]; known in Occitan as Moans e Sartòu or Moans e Sartol) is a commune in the Alpes-Maritimes department in southeastern France. The inhabitants are called Mouansois. The commune of Sartoux was combined with the commune of Mouans, to take the combined name of Mouans-Sartoux by order of Napoleon III on 28 March 1858.

== Population ==
Historical population

Year	Pop.	±% p.a.
1793	438	—
1800	443	+0.16%
1806	485	+1.52%
1821	635	+1.81%
1831	650	+0.23%
1836	672	+0.67%
1841	720	+1.39%
1846	716	−0.11%
1851	729	+0.36%
1856	715	−0.39%
1861	930	+5.40%
1866	966	+0.76%
1872	986	+0.34%
1876	894	−2.42%
1881	1,005	+2.37%
1886	1,018	+0.26%
1891	1,028	+0.20%
1896	984	−0.87%
1901	989	+0.10%

Year	Pop.	±% p.a.
1906	1,062	+1.43%
1911	1,129	+1.23%
1921	1,144	+0.13%
1926	1,331	+3.07%
1931	1,364	+0.49%
1936	1,202	−2.50%
1946	1,188	−0.12%
1954	1,475	+2.74%
1962	2,047	+4.18%
1968	2,873	+5.81%
1975	3,599	+3.27%
1982	5,119	+5.16%
1990	7,989	+5.72%
1999	8,889	+1.19%
2007	10,331	+1.90%
2012	10,214	−0.23%
2017	9,701	−1.03%
2023	11,015	+2.14%

Source: EHESS and INSEE (1968-2023)

== Politics ==
Since 1974, the different mayors have been keen on promoting environment-friendly actions. They notably bought a farm to grow organic vegetables for the school canteens and hired the farmer, which then has a public servant status, a unique fact in France.

== See also ==
- Communes of the Alpes-Maritimes department
