= La Trinité, Alpes-Maritimes =

Commune in Provence-Alpes-Côte d'Azur, France

La Trinité
- Commune
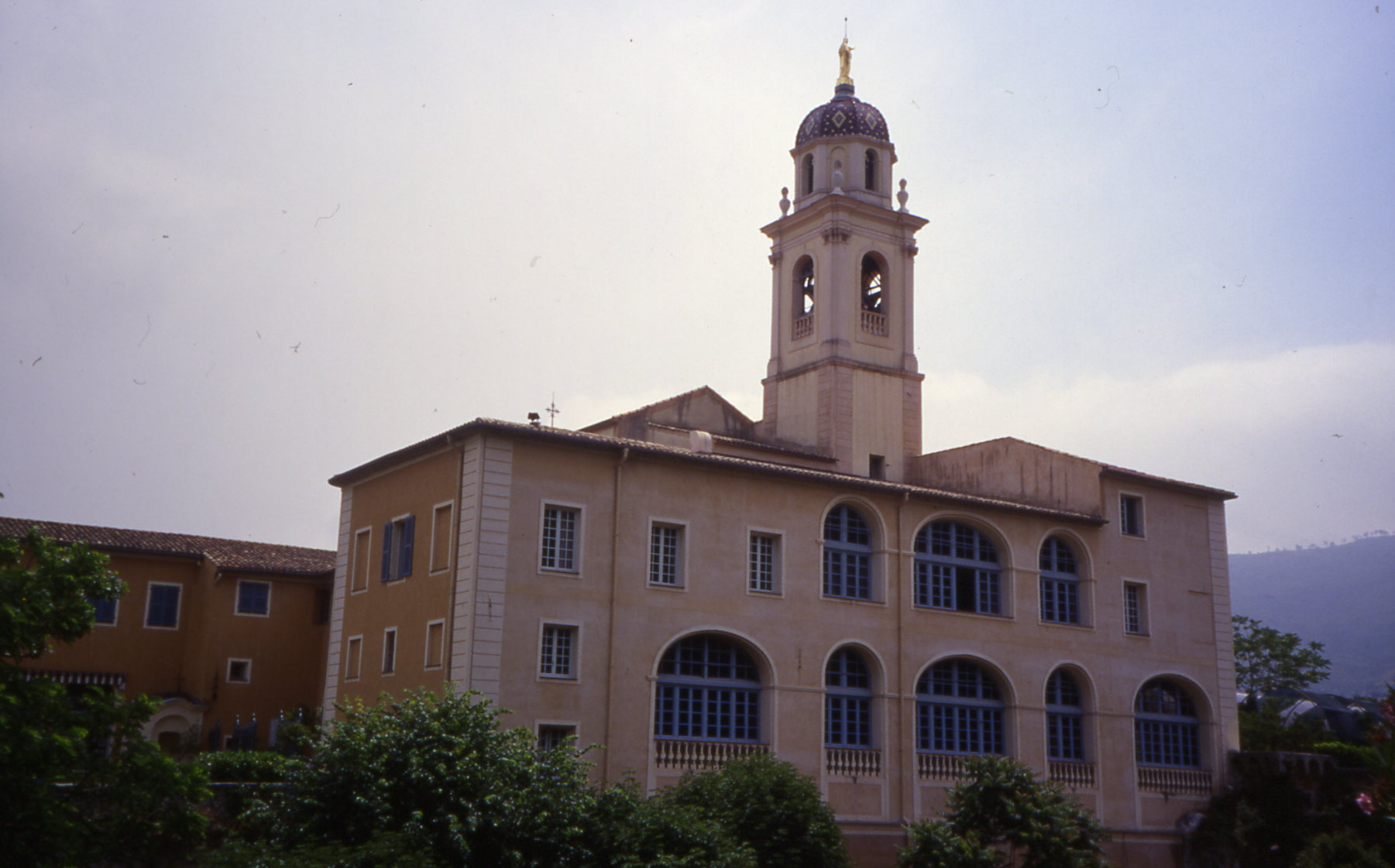
- The monastery of Our Lady of Laghet

- Coat of arms
- Location of La Trinité
- Location within France Location within Provence-Alpes-Côte d'Azur
- Coordinates: 43°44′30″N 7°18′53″E
- Country: France
- Region: Provence-Alpes-Côte d'Azur
- Department: Alpes-Maritimes
- Arrondissement: Nice
- Canton: Nice-7
- Intercommunality: Métropole Nice Côte d'Azur

Government
  - Mayor (2026–32): Ladislas Polski
- Area^{1}: 14.9 km^{2} (5.8 sq mi)
- Elevation: 72 m (236 ft)
- Highest elevation: 700 m (2,300 ft)
- Lowest elevation: 47 m (154 ft)
- Population (2023): 10,602
  - Density: 712/km^{2} (1,840/sq mi)
- Demonym: Trinitaires
- Time zone: UTC+01:00 (CET)
  - Summer (DST): UTC+02:00 (CEST)
- INSEE/Postal code: 06149 /06340
- ^{1} French Land Register data, which excludes lakes, ponds, glaciers > 1 km^{2} (0.386 sq mi or 247 acres) and river estuaries.

La Trinité (French pronunciation: [la tʁinite]; lit. '(The) Trinity'; Occitan: La Ternitat Victor or simply La Ternitat; Nissard: La Ternita Vitour; Italian: Trinità Vittorio) is a commune in the Alpes-Maritimes department, southeastern France.

== History ==
Formerly a small town located on Kingdom of Piedmont-Sardinia main road from Nice to capital Turin, it is located on the left bank of the Paillon river. It has been French since 1860.

With the impressive development of the Nice metropolitan area, La Trinité became a working-class, industrial suburb of the city, about 10 km (6.2 mi) from the center.

The city is known for the Laghet sanctuary.

== Population ==
Historical population

Year	Pop.	±% p.a.
1838	1,393	—
1848	1,424	+0.22%
1858	1,451	+0.19%
1861	1,459	+0.18%
1866	1,468	+0.12%
1872	1,349	−1.40%
1876	1,235	−2.18%
1881	1,250	+0.24%
1886	1,301	+0.80%
1891	1,443	+2.09%
1896	1,282	−2.34%
1901	1,338	+0.86%
1906	1,419	+1.18%
1911	1,664	+3.24%
1921	1,404	−1.68%

Year	Pop.	±% p.a.
1926	2,625	+13.33%
1931	2,875	+1.84%
1936	2,941	+0.45%
1946	2,589	−1.27%
1954	3,102	+2.29%
1962	3,625	+1.97%
1968	4,787	+4.74%
1975	7,068	+5.72%
1982	8,279	+2.28%
1990	10,197	+2.64%
1999	10,046	−0.17%
2007	10,336	+0.36%
2012	10,085	−0.49%
2017	10,017	−0.14%
2023	10,602	+0.95%

Source: EHESS and INSEE (1968-2023)

== Personalities ==
- Charles Lamberton (1876–1960), palaeontogist
- Priscilla: pop singer born in La Trinité
- Nekfeu: rapper born in La Trinité

== See also ==
- Communes of the Alpes-Maritimes department
- List of medieval bridges in France
