= Pégomas =

Commune in Provence-Alpes-Côte d'Azur, France

- Commune
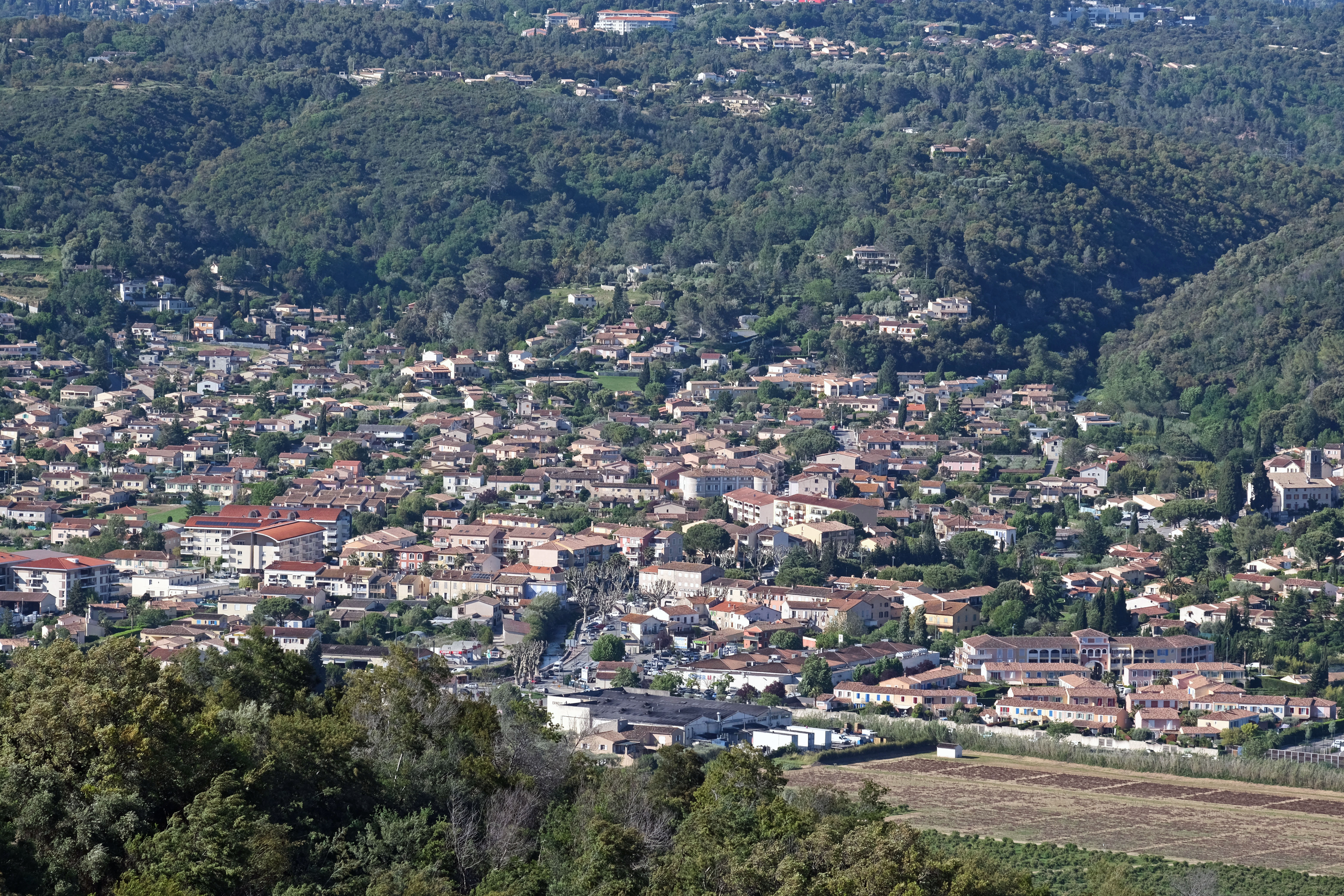
- A general view of Pégomas

- Coat of arms
- Location of Pégomas
- Location within France Location within Provence-Alpes-Côte d'Azur
- Coordinates: 43°35′51″N 6°56′02″E
- Country: France
- Region: Provence-Alpes-Côte d'Azur
- Department: Alpes-Maritimes
- Arrondissement: Grasse
- Canton: Mandelieu-la-Napoule
- Intercommunality: CA Pays de Grasse

Government
  - Mayor (2026–32): Florence Simon
- Area^{1}: 11.28 km^{2} (4.36 sq mi)
- Highest elevation: 483 m (1,585 ft)
- Lowest elevation: 6 m (20 ft)
- Population (2023): 8,240
  - Density: 730/km^{2} (1,890/sq mi)
- Time zone: UTC+01:00 (CET)
  - Summer (DST): UTC+02:00 (CEST)
- INSEE/Postal code: 06090 /06580
- ^{1} French Land Register data, which excludes lakes, ponds, glaciers > 1 km^{2} (0.386 sq mi or 247 acres) and river estuaries.

Pégomas (French pronunciation: [peɡoma] or [peɡomas]) is a commune in the Alpes-Maritimes department in southeastern France.

== Population ==
Historical population
Year	Pop.	±% p.a.
1968	1,717	—
1975	2,149	+3.26%
1982	3,452	+7.01%
1990	4,618	+3.70%
1999	5,794	+2.55%
2007	6,296	+1.04%
2012	7,285	+2.96%
2017	7,972	+1.82%
2023	8,240	+0.55%
Source: INSEE

== Climate ==
On average, Pégomas experiences 6.8 days per year with a minimum temperature below 0 °C (32.0 °F) and 44.7 days per year with a maximum temperature above 30 °C (86.0 °F). The record high temperature was 40.4 °C (104.7 °F) on 19 July 2023, while the record low temperature was −4.4 °C (24.1 °F) on 17 January 2017.

Climate data for Pégomas (1991–2020 normals, extremes 2010–present)
Month	Jan	Feb	Mar	Apr	May	Jun	Jul	Aug	Sep	Oct	Nov	Dec	Year
Record high °C (°F)	23.0 (73.4)	22.2 (72.0)	28.0 (82.4)	27.5 (81.5)	32.9 (91.2)	38.6 (101.5)	40.4 (104.7)	38.7 (101.7)	35.3 (95.5)	30.3 (86.5)	24.8 (76.6)	20.1 (68.2)	40.4 (104.7)
Mean daily maximum °C (°F)	13.6 (56.5)	13.9 (57.0)	16.6 (61.9)	19.3 (66.7)	22.4 (72.3)	27.0 (80.6)	30.3 (86.5)	30.6 (87.1)	27.2 (81.0)	22.2 (72.0)	17.3 (63.1)	14.5 (58.1)	21.2 (70.2)
Daily mean °C (°F)	9.0 (48.2)	9.0 (48.2)	11.5 (52.7)	14.3 (57.7)	17.2 (63.0)	21.6 (70.9)	24.5 (76.1)	24.7 (76.5)	21.5 (70.7)	17.3 (63.1)	12.9 (55.2)	10.0 (50.0)	16.1 (61.0)
Mean daily minimum °C (°F)	4.4 (39.9)	4.2 (39.6)	6.4 (43.5)	9.3 (48.7)	12.0 (53.6)	16.2 (61.2)	18.8 (65.8)	18.8 (65.8)	15.8 (60.4)	12.4 (54.3)	8.5 (47.3)	5.4 (41.7)	11.0 (51.8)
Record low °C (°F)	−4.4 (24.1)	−4.1 (24.6)	−1.0 (30.2)	1.1 (34.0)	5.4 (41.7)	9.2 (48.6)	12.9 (55.2)	13.4 (56.1)	8.3 (46.9)	2.1 (35.8)	−3.0 (26.6)	−2.0 (28.4)	−4.4 (24.1)
Average precipitation mm (inches)	76.2 (3.00)	83.1 (3.27)	96.7 (3.81)	77.4 (3.05)	59.5 (2.34)	52.4 (2.06)	25.3 (1.00)	20.6 (0.81)	51.4 (2.02)	147.3 (5.80)	190.0 (7.48)	103.3 (4.07)	983.2 (38.71)
Average precipitation days (≥ 1.0 mm)	5.6	7.2	6.6	6.1	5.8	3.8	2.3	2.6	4.3	7.1	9.1	5.5	66
Source: Meteociel

== See also ==
- Communes of the Alpes-Maritimes department
