= Canton of Mandelieu-la-Napoule =

Coordinates: 43.55°N 6.93°E

- Canton
- Situation of the canton of Mandelieu-la-Napoule in the department of Alpes-Maritimes
- Country: France
- Region: Provence-Alpes-Côte d'Azur
- Department: Alpes-Maritimes
- No. of communes: {{{nbcomm}}}
- Population (2023): 40,427
- INSEE code: 0613

The canton of Mandelieu-la-Napoule is an administrative division of the Alpes-Maritimes department, southeastern France. It was created at the French canton reorganisation which came into effect in March 2015. Its seat is in Mandelieu-la-Napoule.

It consists of the following communes:

1. Auribeau-sur-Siagne
2. Mandelieu-la-Napoule
3. Pégomas
4. La Roquette-sur-Siagne
5. Théoule-sur-Mer
