= Canton of Cannes-1 =

Coordinates: 43.55°N 6.98°E

- Canton
- Situation of the canton of Cannes-1 in the department of Alpes-Maritimes
- Country: France
- Region: Provence-Alpes-Côte d'Azur
- Department: Alpes-Maritimes
- No. of communes: {{{nbcomm}}}
- Population (2023): 48,992
- INSEE code: 0607

The canton of Cannes-1 is an administrative division of the Alpes-Maritimes department, southeastern France. It was created at the French canton reorganisation which came into effect in March 2015. Its seat is in Cannes.

It consists of the following communes:

1. Cannes (partly)
2. Le Cannet (partly)
