= Canton of Cagnes-sur-Mer-1 =

Coordinates: 43.66°N 7.15°E

- Canton
- Situation of the canton of Cagnes-sur-Mer-1 in the department of Alpes-Maritimes
- Country: France
- Region: Provence-Alpes-Côte d'Azur
- Department: Alpes-Maritimes
- No. of communes: {{{nbcomm}}}
- Population (2023): 44,398
- INSEE code: 0605

The canton of Cagnes-sur-Mer-1 is an administrative division of the Alpes-Maritimes department, southeastern France. It was created at the French canton reorganisation which came into effect in March 2015. Its seat is in Cagnes-sur-Mer.

It consists of the following communes:

1. Cagnes-sur-Mer (partly)
