= Canton of Nice-8 =

Coordinates: 43.71°N 7.29°E

- Canton
- Situation of the canton of Nice-8 in the department of Alpes-Maritimes
- Country: France
- Region: Provence-Alpes-Côte d'Azur
- Department: Alpes-Maritimes
- No. of communes: {{{nbcomm}}}
- Population (2023): 41,573
- INSEE code: 0622

The canton of Nice-8 is an administrative division of the Alpes-Maritimes department, southeastern France. Its borders were modified at the French canton reorganisation which came into effect in March 2015. Its seat is in Nice.

It consists of the following communes:

1. Nice (partly)
