= Courmes family =

- Bourgeoisie
- Coat of arms Father Louis Courme 1696
- Country: France, Provence-Alpes-Côte d'Azur
- Place of origin: Courmes, Grasse
- Founder: Captain Huguenot Luc Corme, 1580
- Members: Claude-Marie Courmes; Marcel-Louis Courmes

The Courmes family (formerly: de Corma, Corme, Cormesse in the feminine, and Courme) is a French family. Their origins come from the ancient French bourgeoisie, Grasse, in Lower Provence.
His birthplace is the neighboring village of Courmes and his filiation followed and proven, in agnatic parentage, since 1580, and followed since 1176.

== Etymology ==
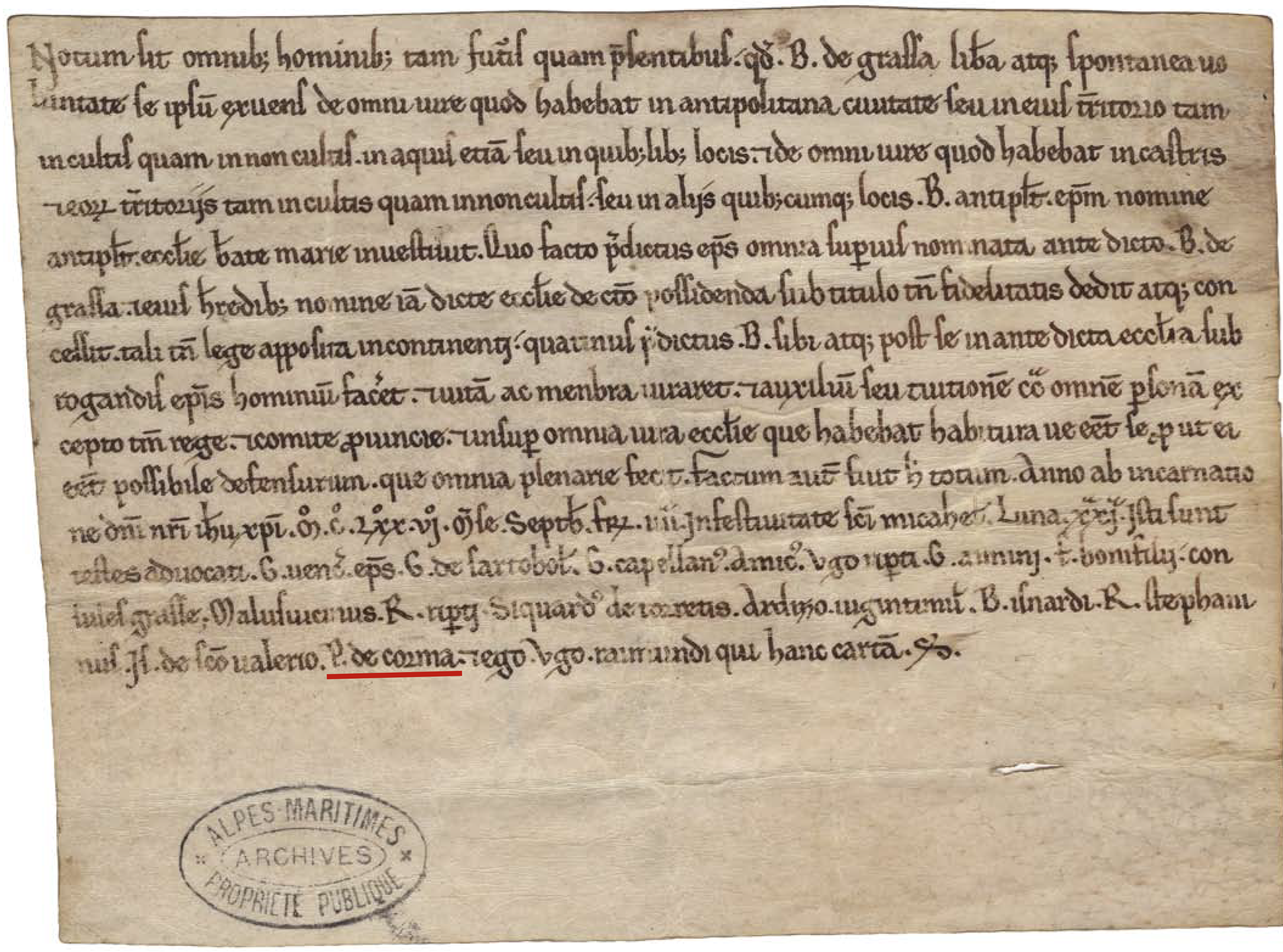
Appearance of the name, Charter of September 29, 1176.

The name appears for the first time in the Gallia Christiana nova; on September 29, 1176, P. de Corma witnessed the signing of a charter between Bertrand de Grasse and Bertrand 1st, bishop of Antibes.

Marie-Thérèse Morlet defines it as a name of locality of origin and more precisely, in this category, a name of provenance, meaning "the one who comes from Courmes".

Albert Dauzat describes the meaning of the name as old Provençal, corma, cornouille. A place planted with dogwood.

== History ==
The existence of a first family of this name was identified by Gilette Gauthier-Ziegler, Archivist-Paleographer. She observes that "from the end of the 14th century to the end of the 15th the Courmes were part of the families which immutably passed on the functions of advisors to the Council of city".

The existence of a first family was confirmed more recently, in 2018, by French historian Thierry Pécout.

=== A line of lawyers ===
If at first glance, this position in the city and in the Consilium ordinarium seems immutable, the Canadian historian professor Jean-Luc Bonnaud allows us to detect a career evolution, "over several generations and most of whose solidarity is played out between the members of this bourgeoisie."

Some traces appear in the 13th century, (Note: Gillelma de Corma, was the first recognized woman of this name, uxor [wife] of Bertrandi de Corma. They are cited in 1252, in the Cartularium episcopatus Grasse n°161. Cartularium episcopatus Grasse. Investigations into the rights and income of Charles 1st of Anjou in Provence (1252 and 1278) Published by Édouard Baratier, Paris Bibliothèque nationale 1969. Collection of unpublished documents on the history of France published by the Ministry of National Education (Committee of Historical and Scientific Works) Series IN-4°) (Note: We find, also in 1252, in this same survey of the rights and income of Charles I of Anjou in Provence: Hugo de Corma: 224. 307. Cartularium episcopatus Forojuliensis. and F de Corma and R de Corma 103. Original Cartularium Turris Antiquae) this family held judicial positions and almost all the male members were lawyers. They begins from the world of regardatores (Note: Raymundus de Corma, regardatores. On November 20, 1260, he signed the first regulation decreed by the viguier of Grasse for the tanners of the city: Original lost; Copy in the Grasse cartulary. Bouches-du-Rhône Departmental Archives. B 1411, f°39 v°s) and notarius (Note: Petrus de Corma, notarius, Nomina dictorum proborum virorum sunt hec. On February 24, 1311, he was one of the signatories of the tariff established by industrial tribunals for the operations of the arbitrators of the city of Grasse: Original lost; Copy in the Grasse cartulary; Archives Départementales des Bouches-du-Rhône, B 1411, f° 28-28 v° - Other copy in the Red Book Archives Municipales de Grasse, AA 1, f°72 v°-73) become clavaire or baile-clavaire. (Note: Honoratum Paulum Corme, baile-clavaire of Villeneuve on December 29, 1361 and clavaire of Grasse on February 12, 1368. Jean-Luc Bonnaud, Un état en Provence. Les officiers locaux du comte de Provence au XIV e siècle (1309-1382) Collection Histoire, Presses Universitaires de Rennes, 2007, p. 100) Their official functions allowing them to be well aware of the market for county farms and the process of renting them, they were able to raise impressive sums of money and take risks to rent the rights of the gabelle. (Note: Jacques Corme, became farmer-general of the gabelle of Fréjus on September 1, 1366. Jean-Luc Bonnaud, Un état en Provence. Les officiers locaux du comte de Provence au XIV e siècle (1309-1382) Collection Histoire, Presses Universitaires de Rennes, 2007, p. 99) These wealthy officers are not yet a homogeneous social group, but this success allows them to send their children to pursue university studies. Once graduated, became Jurisperitus, (Note: Grassus Corme, nobilibus et circunspectis viris homme de noble qualité, avocat, Jurisperitus. Il fut juge de Brignoles 1er septembre 1375, d'Hyères 5 septembre 1376, et de Trascon 17 juillet 1380. Gilette Gauthier-Ziegler, Histoire de Grasse au Moyen Âge de 1155 à 1482, Picard, 1935, p.303) (Note: Domino Grasso Corme, le 30 octobre 1391 est jurisperito de Grassa during the exchange of prisoners between the seneschal of Provence, Georges de Marle, and Vita de Blois. Document filed with the Bérard Study n°34, 30 octobre 1391. Paul-Louis Malaussena, La vie en provence orientale aux XIVe et XVe siècles. Paris, Librairie générale de droit et de jurisprudence R. Pichon et R. Durand-Auzias. 1969, p. 65) with predicate of honor nobilis.

A beginning of filiation appears, in the 15th and 16th centuries, with the three sons of Lady Catherine Cormesse and her husband noble Honorat Corme, doctor of law, Jurisperitus (Note: Noble Honorat Corme, Docteur en droit, Jurisperitus Husband of Lady Catherine Cormesse. Judge of the palace of Marseille on July 8 and November 24, 1379, judge of Digne on September 2, 1380. In May 1400 he participated in the recapture of the monastery of Lérins, which had fallen into the hands of Genoese corsairs. Henri Moris, Inventaire sommaire des archives hospitalières antérieures à 1792, Archives ecclésiastiques. Nice 1893. p.106, p.200, p.202) : Elzéar, Pierre and noble Jacques.

=== French Wars of Religion ===
The surviving Courmes family, whose lineage has been proven since the 16th century, comes in agnatic lineage from the Huguenot captain Luc Corme and his wife Jane Henrique. The life of Luc is known mainly by the fact that he tested twice. On April 14, 1580, during a period of plague, and on November 21, 1589 the day after the defeat of the Huguenots at Grasse.

On November 14, 1589, Baron de Vins, leader of the Leaguers in Provence, laid siege under the ramparts of Grasse. The city resisted for more than a week, attacked by two thousand infantrymen and a thousand cavalry. At the end of this bloody week Grasse capitulated. Luc survived but he abjures.

=== Business world ===
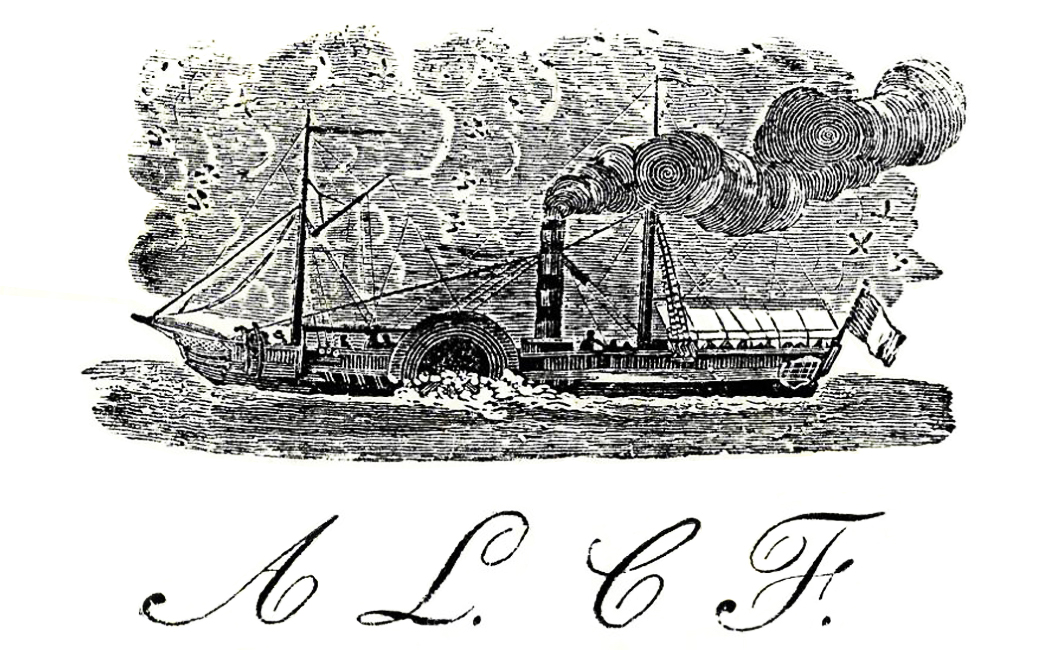
shipowner Antoine et Leon Courmes Brothers, 1841

The pre-eminence of the tannery for centuries of Grasse life is indisputable, all notable families participate profitably in it. Gaspard Courmes in 1690 became the first soapmaker in Grasse. The Courmes houses undoubtedly represented by far the two most important businesses in Grasse, the soap factory maintains close relationships by its very nature, with the oil mill and the emerging perfumeryThe Courmes had warehouses in Grasse and Cannes. Claude-Marie Courmes' soap factory is the most modern. The Courmes house, linked to major Marseille commerce, invests in a commercial fleet and takes shares notably in the "Tartane Saint-Pierre", "L'avenir" and the "Rose-Louise".

=== French Revolution ===
On the eve of the French Revolution, the Courmes were part of the 28 families of Grasse's high society, listed by Hervé de Fontmichel [fr].

Claude-Marie Courmes was part of a group of young royalists from Grasse, the "Children of the Sun" who notably formed a counter-revolutionary gathering on Ventôse 7, Year V (February 25, 1797). Member of the district electoral college in 1804, general councilor of Var from 1811 to 1833, sitting in the majority supporting the July monarchy. Suspected in Year II, he entered the municipal council after Thermidor, he was prosecuted after the republican coup of Year V (1796-1797 September 4).

=== World Wars ===
Captaine Arthur Louis Courmes,. He fought during Franco-Prussian War.

son of Arthur, Chief d'escadrons Marcel Louis Courmes,, École spéciale militaire de Saint-Cyr (1905–1907), École de cavalerie, Saumur (1907–1909), he graduated Major out of 60. He was a French aviator in 1915 during the World War I.

son of Marcel, Lieutenant Christian Courmes,, Siege of Calais (1940), prisoner in 1942 at the Colditz fortress. Escaped from Oflag X-C, not recaptured, he joined the French Forces of the Interior.

sister of Christian, Gilberte Courmes, wife of the Companions of Liberation Colonel Maurice Delage,, X 1925 he joined General Leclerc's Force "L" and created the 13th engineering battalion of the 2nd Armored Division, taking command of which he took part in the Operation Overlord and the Liberation of Paris.

=== Impressionism ===
On March 21, 1910, in Grez-sur-Loing, Chief d'escadrons Marcel Courmes married Louise Read Chadwick, daughter of the American painter Francis Brooks Chadwick and the Swedish painter Emma Löwstädt-Chadwick.

== Galleries ==
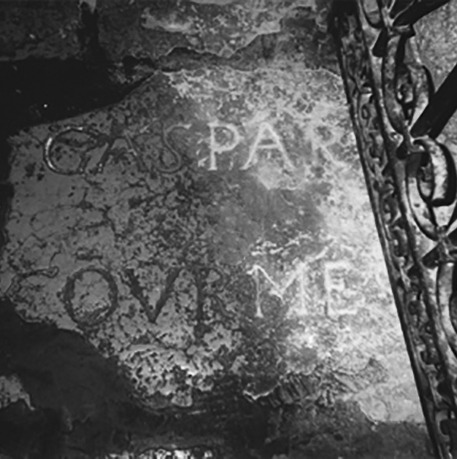
Gaspard Courmes (1664–1749)
Funeral slab
Grasse Cathedral crypt

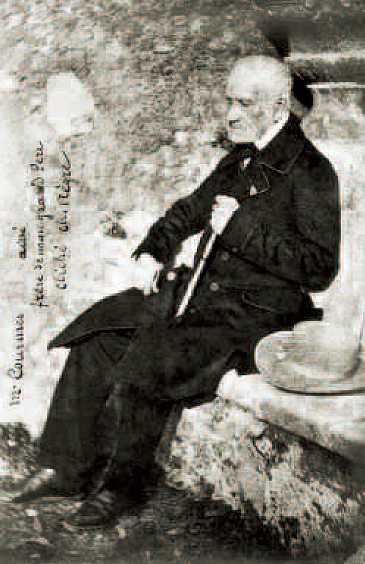
Claude-Marie Courmes,
(1770+1865)
Mayor of Grasse from 1830 to 1835

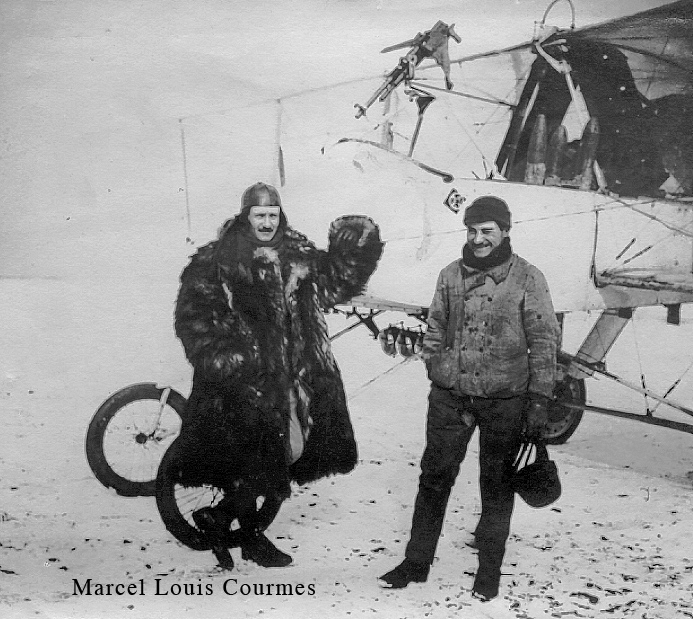
Marcel-Louis Courmes
(1885–1950)
aviator during the First World War

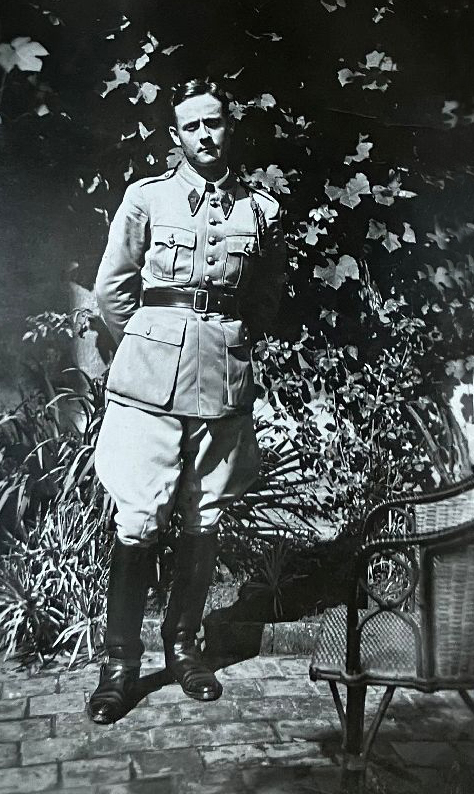
Christian Courmes
prisoner in 1942 at the Colditz fortress

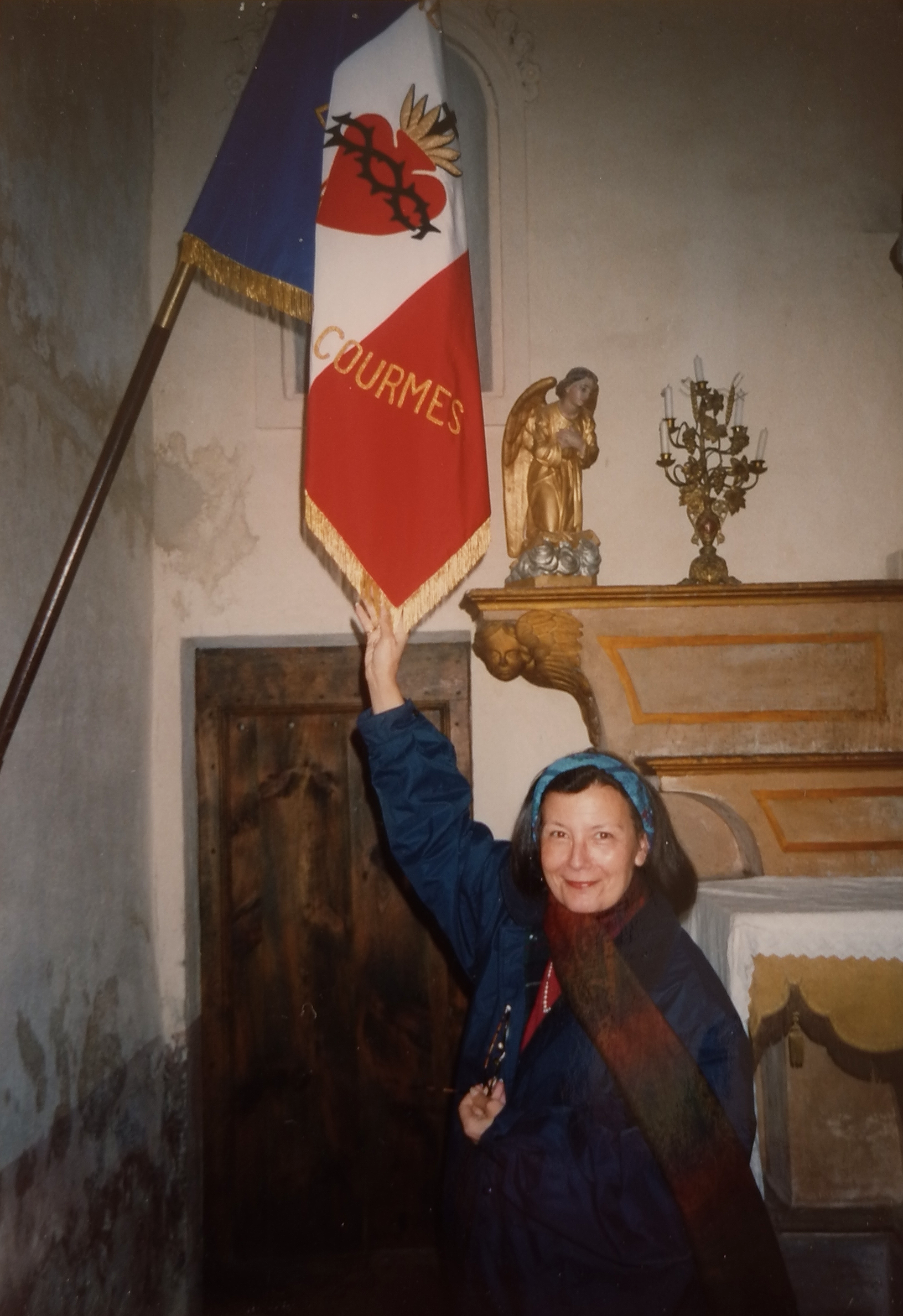
Marie-Françoise Courmes
Church of Courmes 1985

Agnatic parentage Courmes
- Huguenot Captain Luc Corme, he tested twice in 1580 and 1589 (? - before 1620). married to Jehane Henrique who tested in 1580. Of which :
  - Antoine Courmes, (? - before March 1638) (cited in the marriage contract of his brother Vincent in 1621 and in the marriage contract of his son Honoré on March 10, 1638), married December 30, 1604 to Honorade Albarne. Of which :
    - Nicolas Courmes, born August 8, 1616, Merchant master shoemaker from Grasse, married December 28, 1643 to Lucrèce Pons. Of which :
      - Honoré Courmes, Merchant from Grasse (1661–1733), married on December 9, 1683, to Jeanne Guidal (1659–1724). Of which :
        - Gaspard Courmes, Merchant in Grasse, born November 6, 1664, and died in 1749, married March 2, 1699 to Françoise Ferron (1682–1748). Of which :
          - Claude Courmes, Bourgeois de Grasse, merchant, born January 27, 1703, married March 3, 1727 to Marie-Marguerite Pons. Of which :
            - Pierre-Gaspard Courmes (1731–1802), Bourgeois of Grasse, merchant, consul of Grasse, administrator of the department of Var (1792), rector of the white penitents of Grasse (1769, 1770 and 1783). Of which :
              - Claude-Marie Courmes (1770–1865), Bourgeois of Grasse, trader, shipowner. General councilor (1811–1833) and deputy for Var (1831–1834), mayor of Grasse (1830–1835). Married in 1801 to Marie Marguerite Justine Isnard (1779–1851), niece of Baron Isnard. Of which :
              - Antoine Joseph Matthieu Courmes (1777–1858), Bourgeois of Grasse, trader, shipowner and consul of Grasse, he bought with his brother, in 1813, the old Clapier Cabris hotel [fr]. Married to Justine Boulay. Of which :
                - Captain Arthur Antoine Louis Courmes, born July 29, 1848. Married to Euphémie Louise Gabrielle Segond. Knight of the Legion of Honour. Of which :
                  - Chief d'escadrons Marcel Courmes, born June 13, 1885, married March 21, 1910 to Louise Chadwick. Student at the Special Military School of Saint-Cyr (1905–1907), 90th promotion known as The Last of the Old Bahut. Graduated 6th out of 277, then student at the Cavalry School of Saumur (1907–1909) from which he graduated at the top of his class. Aviator in 1915. Knight of the Legion of Honor on August 15, 1915. Of which :
                    - Lieutenant Christian Courmes (1913–1987), he was taken prisoner on May 26, 1940, and was sent on April 10, 1941, to Oflag IV-D where he made several escape attempts. He was transferred in August 1942 to the Colditz fortress where he spent a year and after further unsuccessful escape work, he was sent in August 1943 to the Lübeck special camp Oflag X-C. He proposed to his comrades the "call tunnel". He managed to escape on his sixth attempt on May 18, 1944, and joined the French Forces of the Interior. Of which :

== Coats of arms ==
Father Louis Courmes, priest, "Bénéficier en l'Église Catédralle de Grasse" received arms in 1696.
"Vert, a bend or"

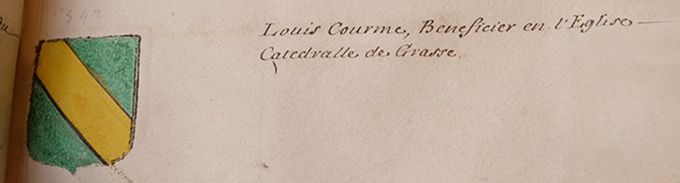
Coat of armes Louis Courmes, 1696

== Odonymy ==
- Boulevard Courmes, 06530 Saint-Cézaire-sur-Siagne
- Rue Courmes, 83000 Toulon
- Chemin des Courmes, 06140 Tourrettes-sur-Loup

== Bibliography ==
- Georges Doublet, Collection of acts of the Bishops of Antibes Monaco, Paris, Picard, 1915
- Gilette Gauthier-Ziegler, History of Grasse in the Middle Ages of 1155 to 1482, Picard, 1935.
- Hervé Court de Fontmichel, Le Pays de Grasse, Grasset, 1963.
- Jean-Luc Bonnaud, A state in Provence. The local officers of the Count of Provence in the 14th century (1309–1382), Presse Universitaires de Rennes, Collection: Histoire 2007.
- Thierry Pécout, The farm of royal rights in Angevin Provence (12th-14th century): A method of government, École Française de Rome, 2018.
