= Loup (river) =

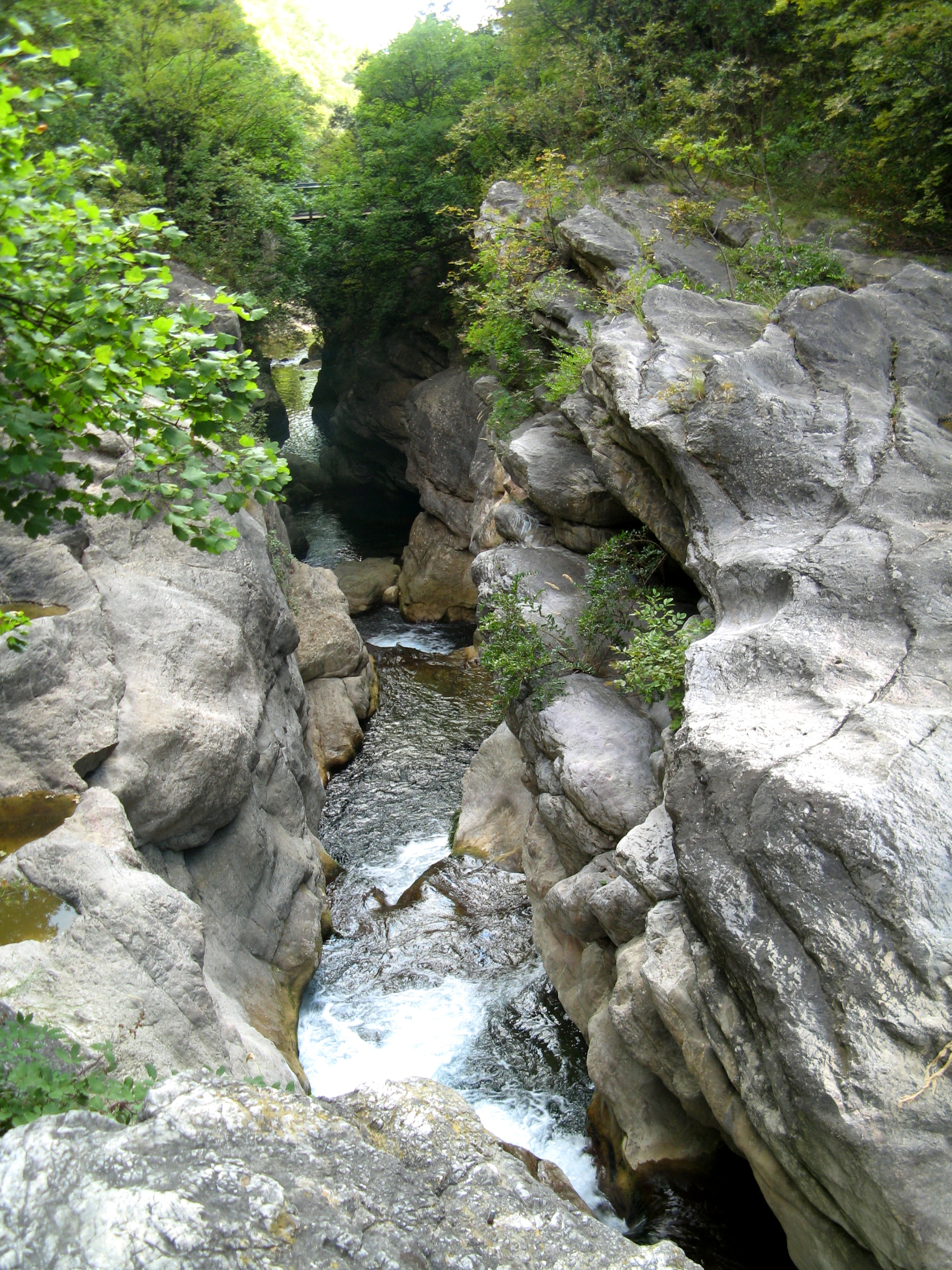
- The Gorges du Loup in Tourrettes-sur-Loup

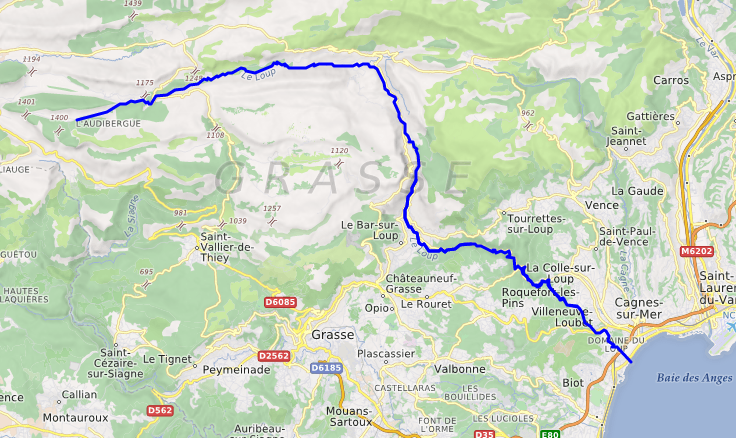
- Native name: La Liane (French)

Location
- Country: France

Physical characteristics
- Source
  - location: Montagne de l'Audibergue (Alpes-Maritimes)
  - coordinates: 43°46′3″N 6°47′20″E
- Mouth
  - location: Mediterranean Sea
  - coordinates: 43°38′35″N 7°8′41″E
- Length: 49 km (30 mi)
- Basin size: 289 km^{2} (112 sq mi)

The Loup (French pronunciation: [lu]; Occitan: Lop) is a river in the Alpes-Maritimes department, Southeastern France. With a length of 49 kilometres (30 mi), it ends in the Mediterranean Sea in Villeneuve-Loubet, near Cagnes-sur-Mer. It takes its source in Andon.

== Geography ==
The total length of the river is 49.3 kilometres (30.6 miles).

The source of the Loup is north of the mountain of Audibergue in the municipality of Andon, a small town in the Alpes-Maritimes situated at nearly 1,200 meters (3,900 ft) above sea level and surrounded by small ski resorts.

The stream first turns east, then turns south and forms the Gorges du Loup, a series of gorges. After passing Bar-sur-Loup, it resumes its course towards the east, passes south of the city of Vence, then moves towards the south-east and arrives at Villeneuve-Loubet.

From there it flows into the Mediterranean Sea southwest of Cagnes-sur-Mer.

== Hydrology ==
The water flow in the Loup was observed for a period of 34 years (1980-2013) in Villeneuve-Loubet, a commune in the Alpes-Maritimes department, located at its mouth at the Mediterranean Sea. The river's catchment area is 289 km^{2} (112 sq mi), and the average flow rate is 4.480 m^{3}/s.

== Cities and villages along the river ==
The Loup flows through the following cities and villages (source to mouth):

Andon, Gréolières, Cipières, Courmes, Gourdon, Pont-du-Loup, Bar-sur-Loup, La Colle-sur-Loup, Villeneuve-Loubet

== Gorges du Loup ==
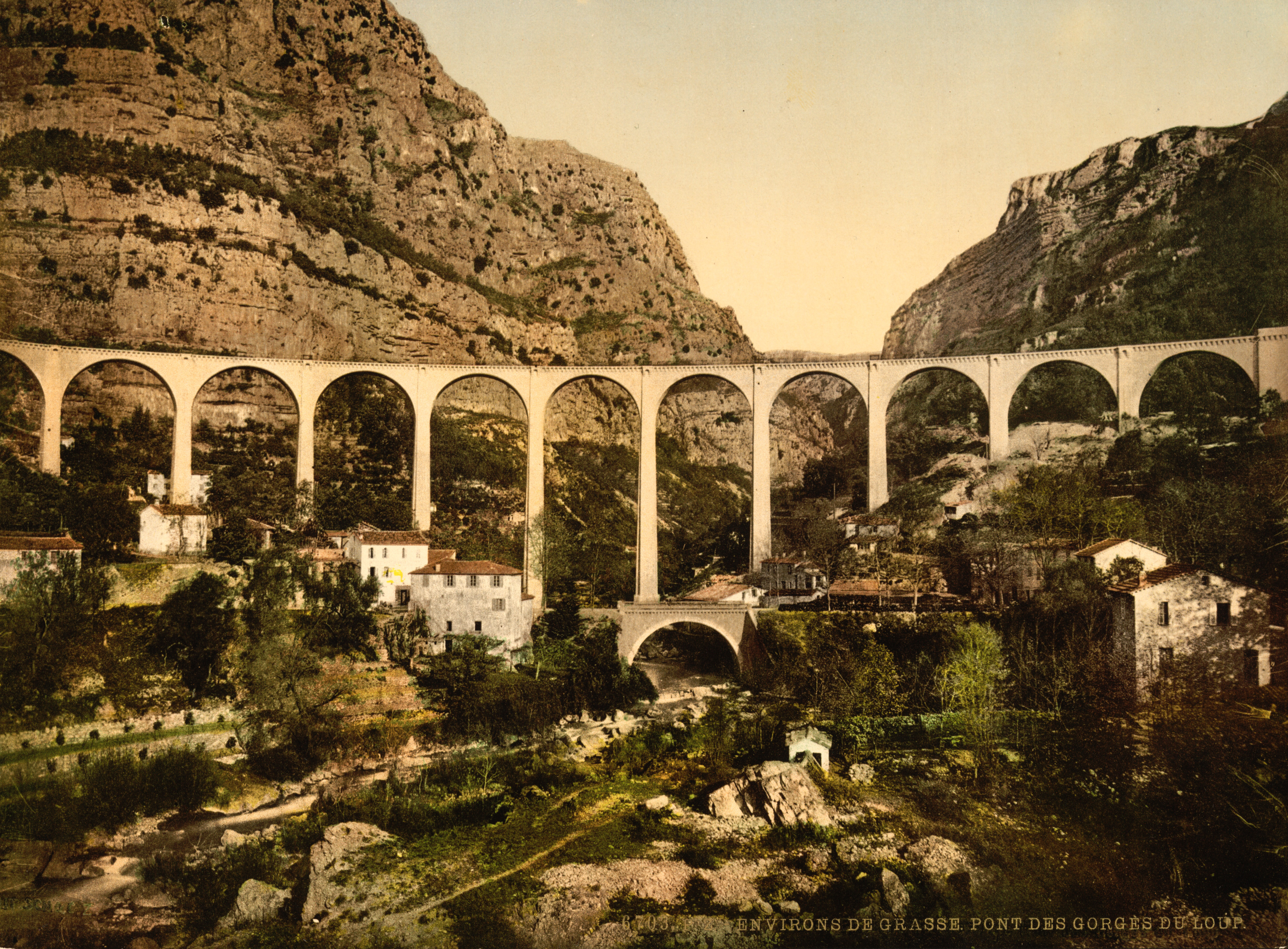
Bridge over the Loup near Pont du Loup. The upper viaduct was destroyed during the Second World War.

The Gorges du Loup is a gorge carved by the Loup river in the Maritime Alps in France, about 45 minutes from Nice.

=== Waterfalls ===
There are several cascades in the gorge. Among them are the Saut du Loup and the Cascade de Courmes.

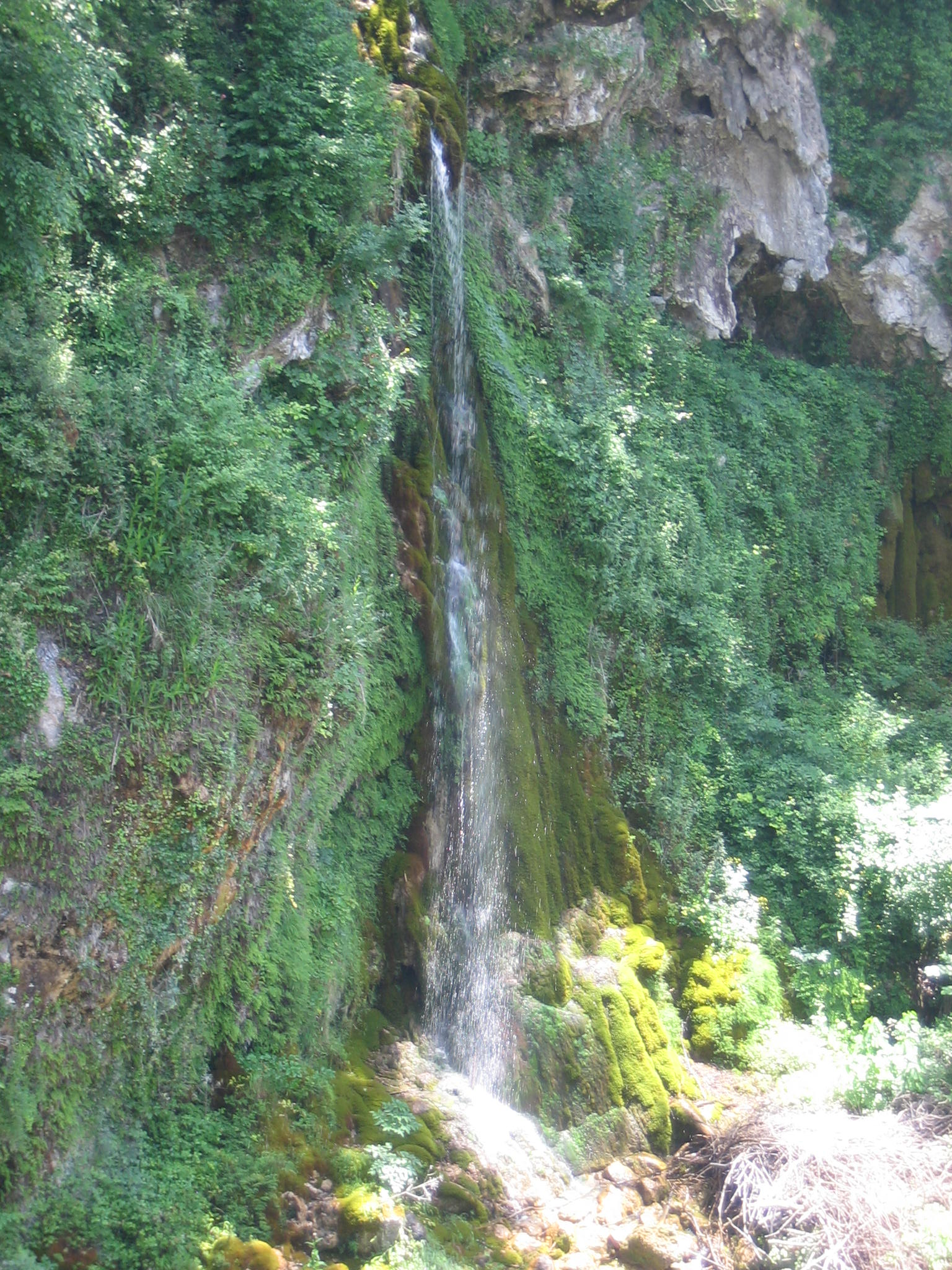
Saut du Loup

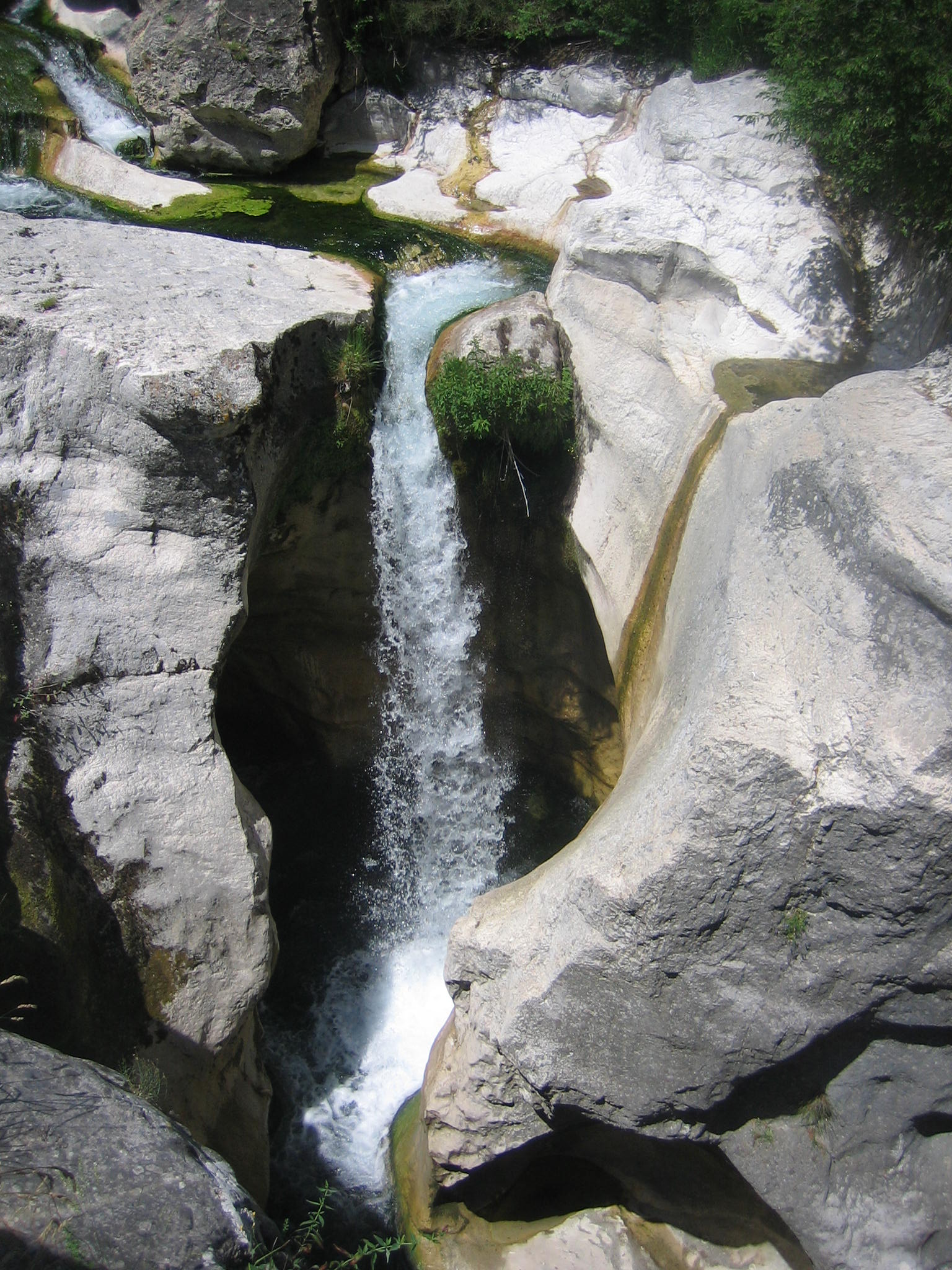
Saut du Loup

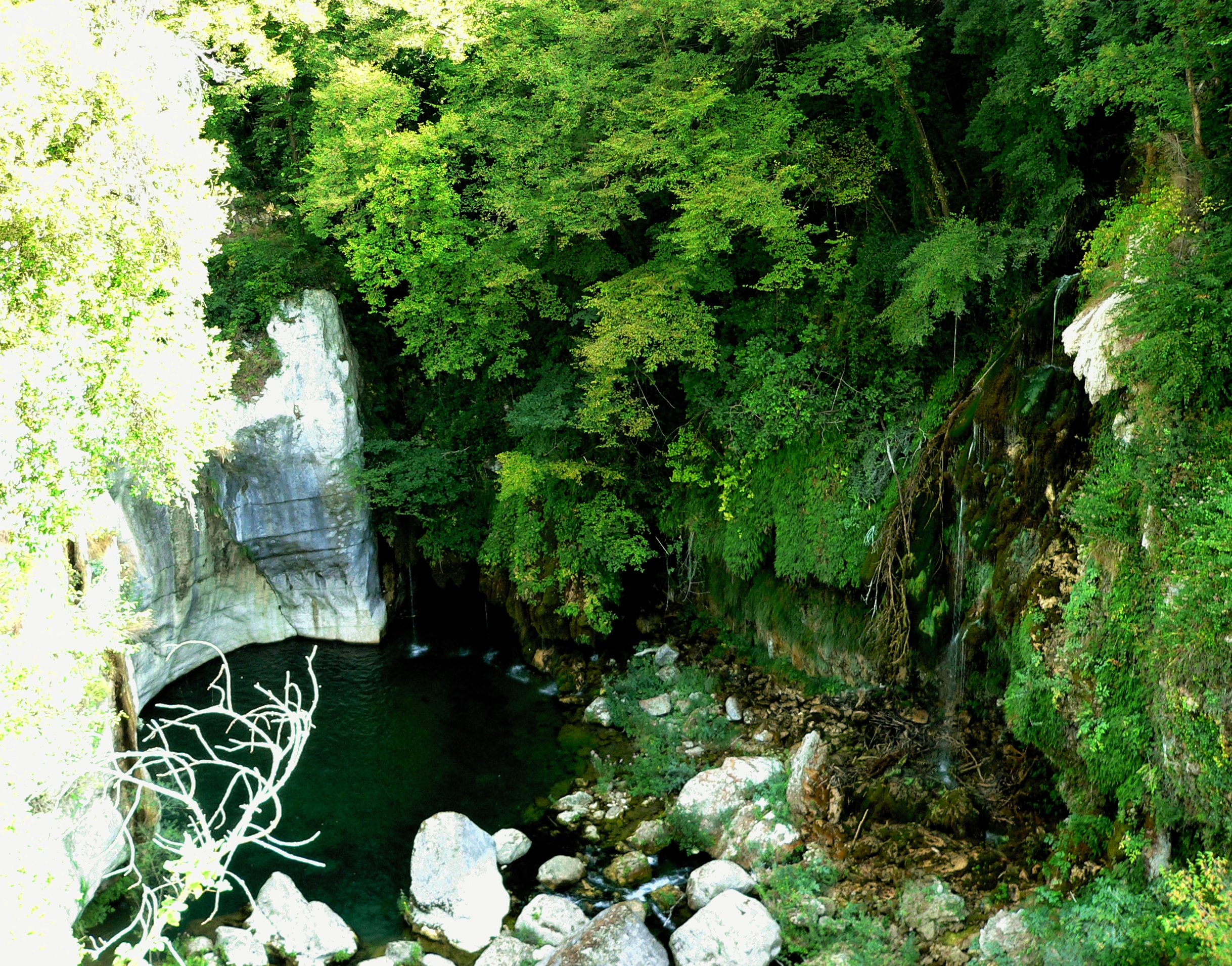
Saut du Loup

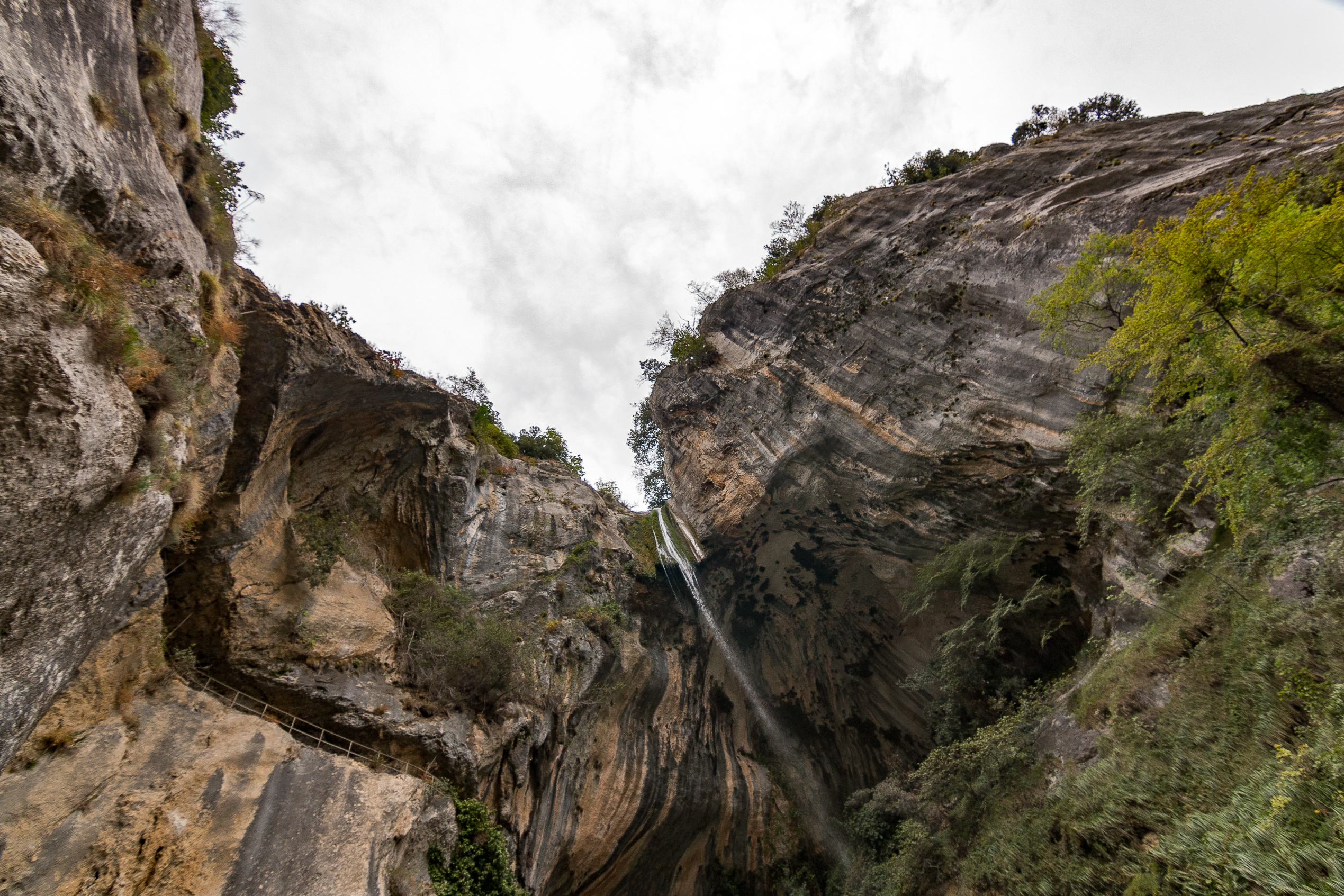
Cascade de Courmes

=== Climbing ===
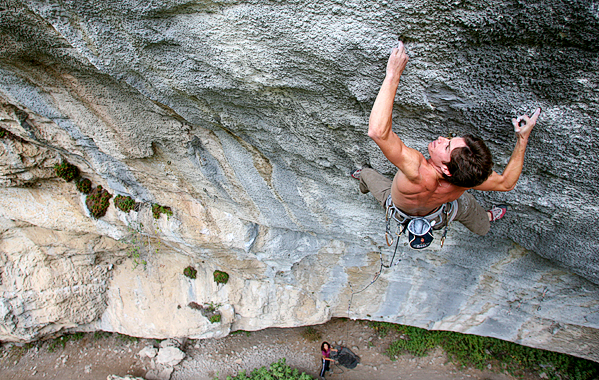
Alexandre Chabot climbs the 9a sport route PuntX

The gorge is a popular climbing area with several high-level routes, with at least 22 routes above the grade 5.14 (8c/+). According to UKClimbing the gorge offers a total of 451 routes set in the French limestone. The first free route in the gorge was Déversé Satanique, opened by Bernard Duterte in the mid-1980s. Now graded 8a+ (5.13c).

==== 9a difficulty routes ====
- Kick Ass - August 2012 - Enzo Oddo
- Trip Tik Tonik - July 2011 - Gérome Pouvreau
- PuntX - 12 August 2007 - Alexandre Chabot
- Abysse - 28 July 2006 - Alexandre Chabot
- Kinematix - 6 October 2001 - Andreas Bindhammer
