= Courmes =

Commune in Provence-Alpes-Côte d'Azur, France

Courmes Corma (Occitan)
- Commune
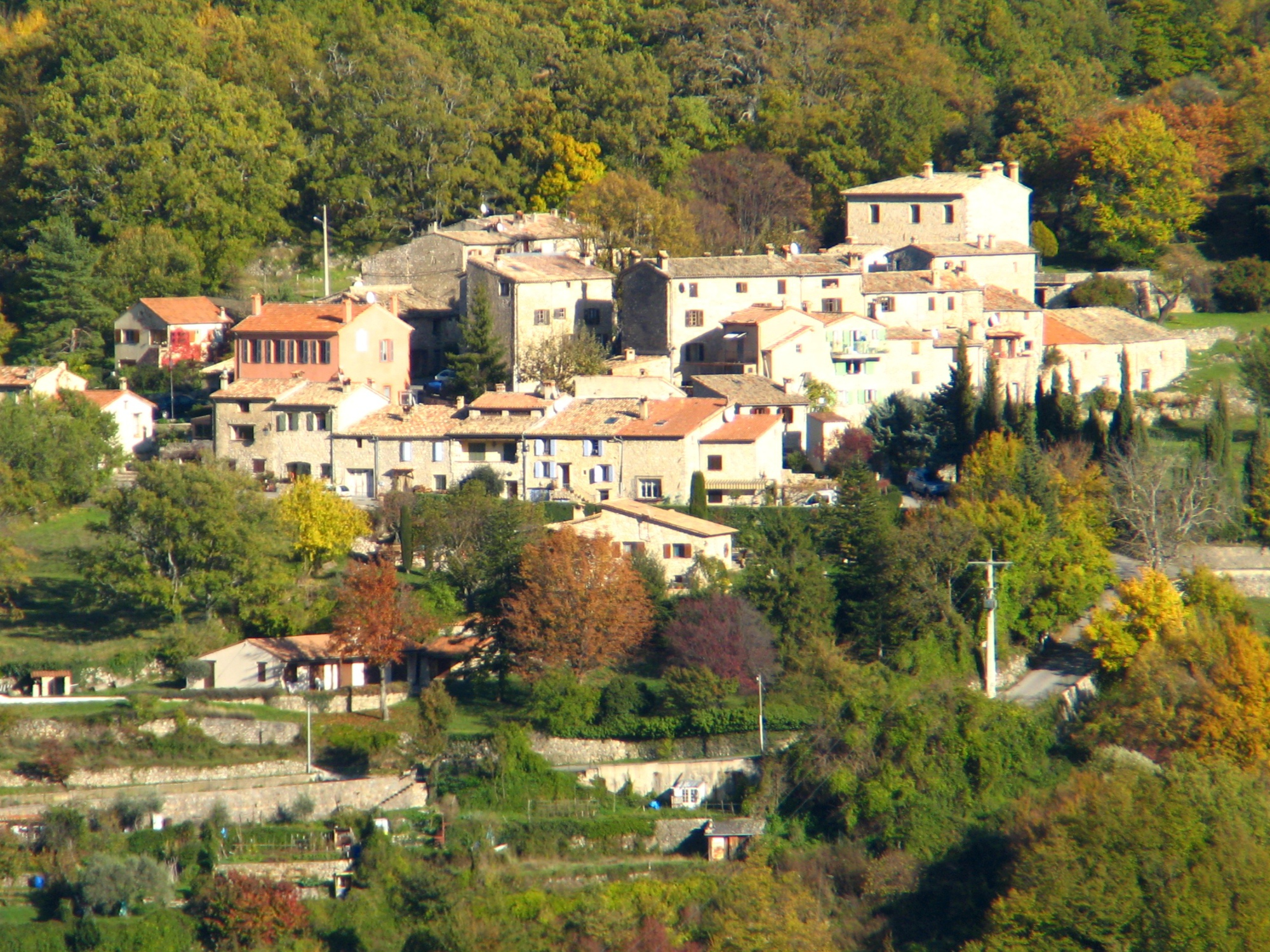
- A general view of the village

- Coat of arms
- Location of Courmes
- Location within France Location within Provence-Alpes-Côte d'Azur
- Coordinates: 43°44′37″N 7°00′35″E
- Country: France
- Region: Provence-Alpes-Côte d'Azur
- Department: Alpes-Maritimes
- Arrondissement: Grasse
- Canton: Valbonne
- Intercommunality: CA Sophia Antipolis

Government
  - Mayor (2026–32): Richard Thiery
- Area^{1}: 15.71 km^{2} (6.07 sq mi)
- Elevation: 630 m (2,070 ft)
- Highest elevation: 1,263 m (4,144 ft)
- Lowest elevation: 260 m (850 ft)
- Population (2023): 109
  - Density: 6.94/km^{2} (18.0/sq mi)
- Demonym: Courmois
- Time zone: UTC+01:00 (CET)
  - Summer (DST): UTC+02:00 (CEST)
- INSEE/Postal code: 06049 /06620
- Website: www.courmes.fr
- ^{1} French Land Register data, which excludes lakes, ponds, glaciers > 1 km^{2} (0.386 sq mi or 247 acres) and river estuaries.

Courmes (French pronunciation: [kuʁm]; Occitan: Cormes) is a commune in the Alpes-Maritimes department in the Provence-Alpes-Côte d'Azur region in Southeastern France. It is part of Préalpes d'Azur Regional Natural Park.

The Loup River, which marks the western border with Gourdon, offers scenic hikes in the area, renowned for its river gorges (Gorges du Loup), including around the Cascades du Saut du Loup between Courmes and Gourdon, as well as the Cascade de Courmes below.

== Demographics ==
Historical population
Year	Pop.	±% p.a.
1968	26	—
1975	42	+7.09%
1982	60	+5.23%
1990	64	+0.81%
1999	88	+3.60%
2007	95	+0.96%
2012	106	+2.22%
2017	120	+2.51%
2023	109	−1.59%
Source: INSEE

== Toponymy ==
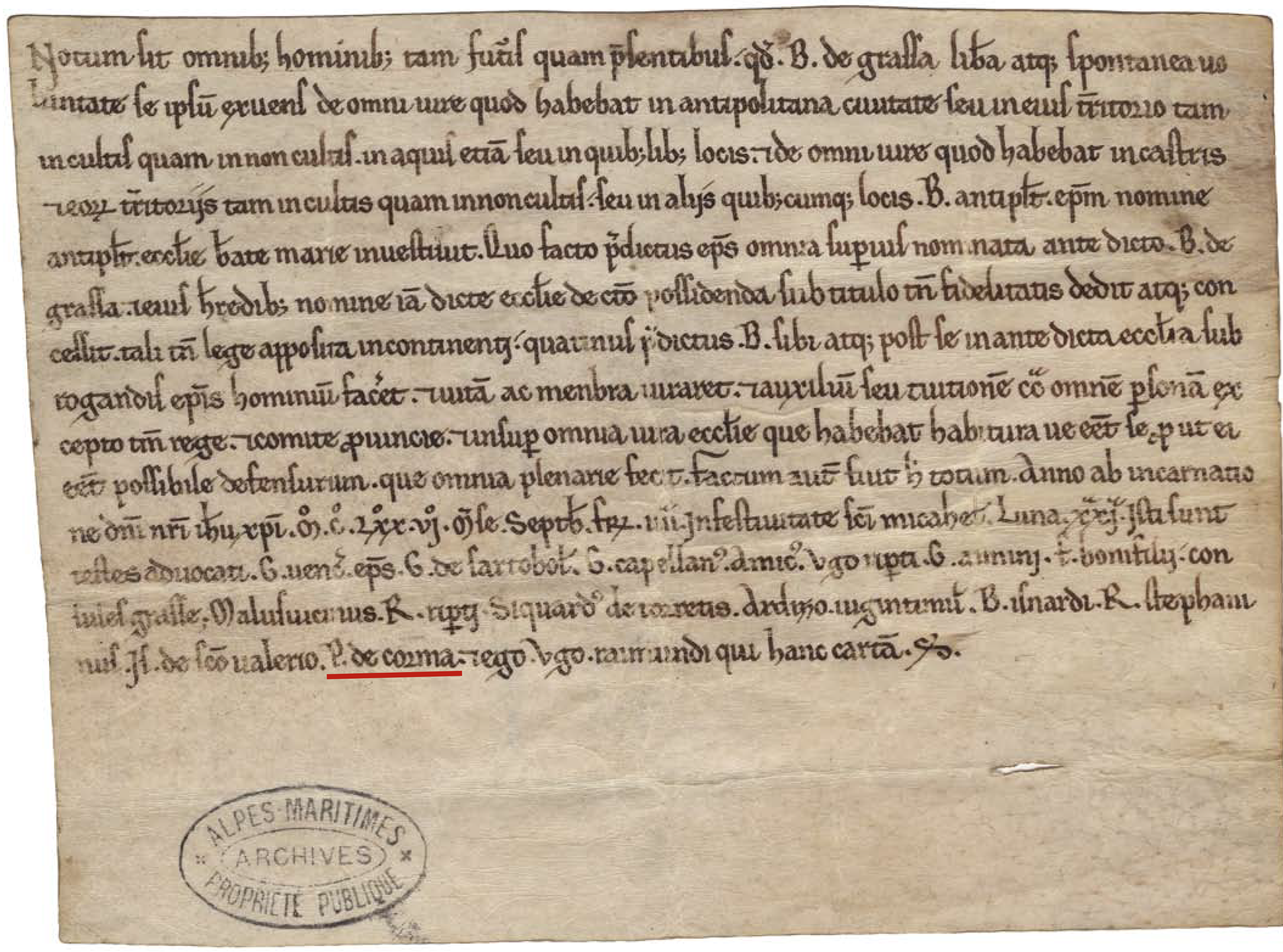
First appearance of the name: a character, P. de Corma, signatory of a charter (September 29, 1176.)

Albert Dauzat describes Corma (1176) as old Provençal : A place planted with Cornus mas, or an oronym pre-Latin.

Marie-Thérèse Morlet does not take up in her recent research (1997), the possibility left by Dauzat of a pre-Latin oronym.

Frédéric Mistral in Lou Tresor dóu Felibrige (1878-1886) writes that Courmo, Courmes is a place name in the Alpes-Maritimes and that Courmes and Decormis [fr] are Provençal family names.

== See also ==
- Communes of the Alpes-Maritimes department
