= Cipières =

Commune in Provence-Alpes-Côte d'Azur, France

- Commune
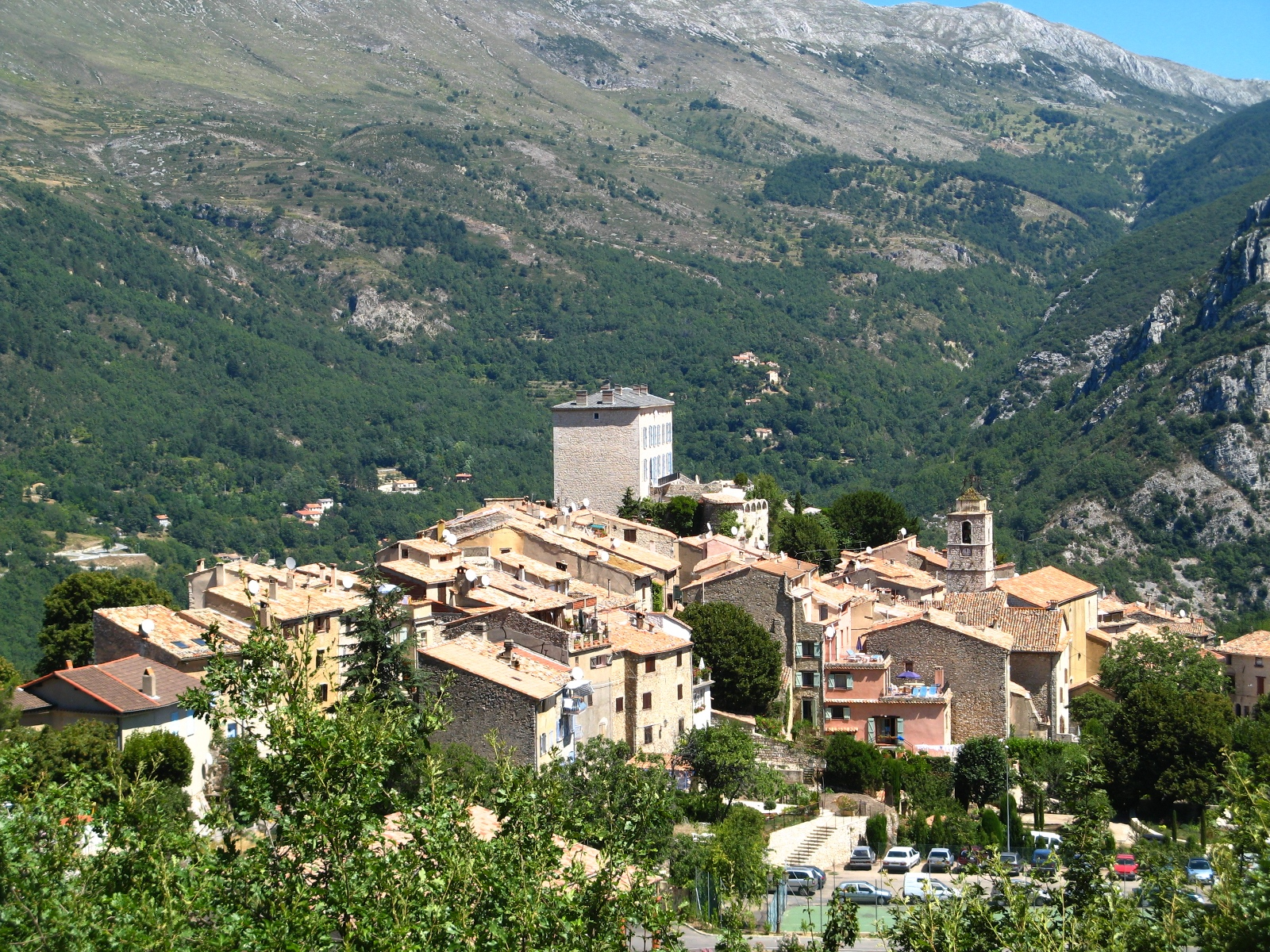
- A general view of the village

- Coat of arms
- Location of Cipières
- Location within France Location within Provence-Alpes-Côte d'Azur
- Coordinates: 43°47′03″N 6°57′21″E
- Country: France
- Region: Provence-Alpes-Côte d'Azur
- Department: Alpes-Maritimes
- Arrondissement: Grasse
- Canton: Valbonne
- Intercommunality: CA Sophia Antipolis

Government
  - Mayor (2026–32): Gilbert Taulane
- Area^{1}: 38.15 km^{2} (14.73 sq mi)
- Elevation: 780 m (2,560 ft)
- Highest elevation: 1,381 m (4,531 ft)
- Lowest elevation: 459 m (1,506 ft)
- Population (2023): 393
  - Density: 10.3/km^{2} (26.7/sq mi)
- Time zone: UTC+01:00 (CET)
  - Summer (DST): UTC+02:00 (CEST)
- INSEE/Postal code: 06041 /06620
- ^{1} French Land Register data, which excludes lakes, ponds, glaciers > 1 km^{2} (0.386 sq mi or 247 acres) and river estuaries.

Cipières (French pronunciation: [sipjɛʁ]; Occitan: Cipieras) is a commune in the Alpes-Maritimes department in southeastern France.

Cipieres is about 50 minutes drive from the French Riviera, and is an unspoilt medieval village of around 400 inhabitants. There are two restaurants, a pizzeria and a general store. Sheep are farmed on the surrounding mountain side and a farm sells lamb direct and also makes a renowned goats cheese. There is an annual free rock festival (Ciprock) as well as a homemade kart race through the narrow streets, attracting children as well as some more serious adults.

The climate is warm and mediterreanan and has far reaching views across the valley of the Loup to the peak of Mount Cheiron, with the village of Gréolières in the foreground.

== Population ==
Historical population
Year	Pop.	±% p.a.
1968	139	—
1975	131	−0.84%
1982	179	+4.56%
1990	222	+2.73%
1999	269	+2.16%
2007	355	+3.53%
2012	372	+0.94%
2017	396	+1.26%
2023	393	−0.13%
Source: INSEE

== See also ==
- Communes of the Alpes-Maritimes department
