= Maurice Delage (soldier) =

French engineer and soldier

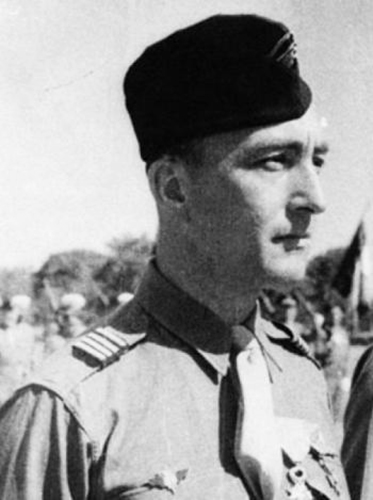
- Born: 6 August 1906; Bruay-sur-l'Escaut
- Died: 8 April 1959 (aged 52); Paris, France
- Education: École Polytechnique X25
- Military career
- Allegiance: France, Free France
- Rank: Colonel (France)
- Unit: 13e régiment du génie
- Conflicts: World War Two
- Other work: Engineer
- Website: Compagnon Maurice Delage

Maurice Delage (Bruay-sur-l'Escaut, 6 August 1906 – Paris, April 8, 1959) was a French engineer and soldier, Compagnon de la Libération. At the start of the Second World War, he decided to join the Free France for whose benefit he managed the exploitation of mines in Africa. He was then assigned to the 2nd Armored Division (France) which he followed throughout the war, from North Africa to Germany, participating in the Battle of Normandy and the Liberation of Paris.

== Biography ==
=== Youth and commitment ===
Delage was born on August 6, 1906 in Bruay-sur-l'Escaut in the département du Nord, of an engineer father. Following in his father's footsteps, he turned towards engineering and entered the École polytechnique (France) in 1925. When he left two years later, he joined the Engineering Application School for a year then entered the École nationale supérieure des mines de Saint-Étienne. After completing his training, he became a civil engineer and worked in Tunisia in the public works and metal construction sector, then he left for Romania to work in the oil industry.

He is married on August 7, 1946, in Douala, Cameroon, to Gilberte Louise Courmes (1910-1951), daughter of Marcel Courmes.

=== Second World War ===
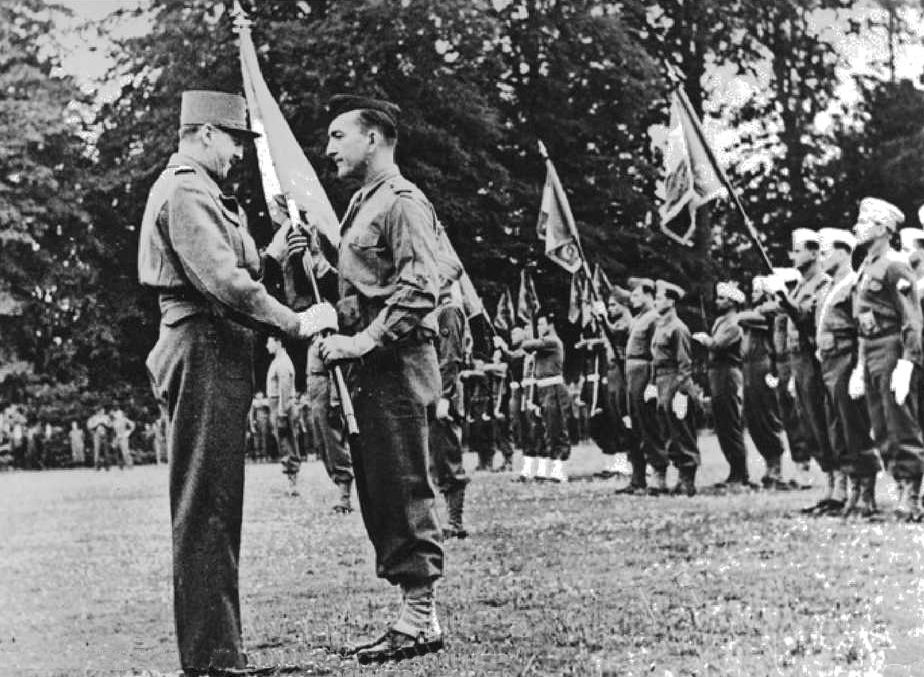
Captain Delage receives the 13th engineering battalion flag (2e DB) from General Kœnig.

Still in Romania at the start of the Second World War, he participated in the sabotage of Romanian oil wells in order to prevent Germany from seizing this resource. Arrested by the authorities in July 1940, he was expelled from Romania but refused orders from the Vichy regime to return to France. He took refuge in the summer of 1944 in Beirut where he joined the Free French forces before leaving for London. His quality as a mining engineer led him to be sent to Brazzaville where he took charge of the mining service of Congo, then to take interim management of a mine gold in Cameroon.

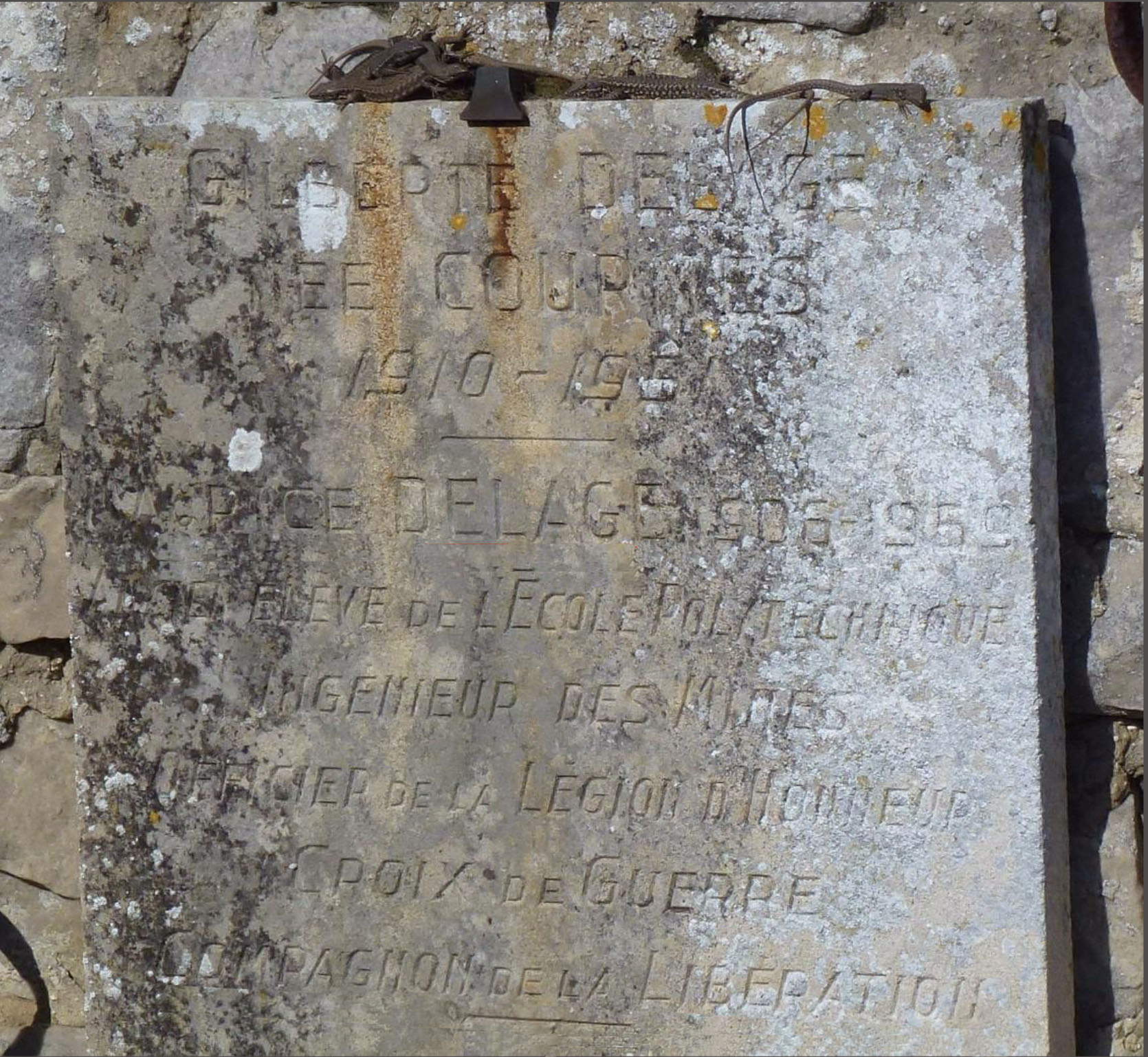
Tomb of Maurice Delage and his wife Gilberte Courmes, in the Grez-sur-Loing cemetery in Seine-et-Marne.

Promoted to captain, he was assigned to the Force "L" of General Leclerc in the spring of 1943 and became deputy to the commander of the 2nd engineer battalion. In June 1943, he organized with meritorious non-commissioned officers and a group of students from the National Agronomic Institute of Tunisia a school for cadets of which he was director of studies until March 1944. At the same time, from September 1943 to May 1944, he participated in the reinforcement of the battalion companies then created the 13th engineering battalion of which he took command. After receiving the battalion flag from General Kœnig, he led his unit to Normandy where he landed on 1 August 1944 with the 2nd Armored Division (2e DB). He then took part in the Liberation of Paris and then in the Battle of the Vosges during which he was injured by a shrapnel at Châtel-sur -Moselle. After taking part in the Battle of Alsace he finished the war as battalion commander with the 2nd DB in Germany at the head of the division's engineering detachment.

=== After war ===
Reserve colonel after the war, he became general director of the central uranium company. Maurice Delage died on April 8, 1959 following a surgical operation. He is buried, with his wife Gilberte Louise Courmes (1910-1951), daughter of Marcel Courmes, in the Grez-sur-Loing cemetery in Seine-et-Marne.

== Awards and honours ==
=== National honours ===
Ribbon bar	Honour
	Officier de la Légion d'honneur
	Compagnon de la Libération, décret du 17 novembre 1945.

=== Ministerial honours ===
Ribbon bar	Honour
	Chevalier de l'Ordre du Mérite agricole

=== Decorations and medals ===
Ribbon bar	Honour
	Military medal
	War Cross 1939–1945 (4 Palms)

=== Foreign decoration ===
Ribbon bar	Honour
	Chevalier du Nichan Iftikar

== See also ==
- Musée de l'Ordre de la Libération
- List of companions of the Liberation

== Bibliography ==
- François Marcot, Dictionnaire historique de la résistance, Éditions Robert Laffont 2006. ISBN 2-221-09997-4
