= Canton of Valbonne =

Coordinates: 43.64°N 7.01°E

- Canton
- Situation of the canton of Valbonne in the department of Alpes-Maritimes
- Country: France
- Region: Provence-Alpes-Côte d'Azur
- Department: Alpes-Maritimes
- No. of communes: {{{nbcomm}}}
- Population (2023): 37,550
- INSEE code: 0625

The canton of Valbonne is an administrative division of the Alpes-Maritimes department, southeastern France. It was created at the French canton reorganisation which came into effect in March 2015. Its seat is in Valbonne.

It consists of the following communes:

1. Antibes (partly)
2. Le Bar-sur-Loup
3. Caussols
4. Châteauneuf-Grasse
5. Cipières
6. Courmes
7. Gourdon
8. Gréolières
9. Opio
10. Le Rouret
11. Tourrettes-sur-Loup
12. Valbonne
