= François René Mallarmé =

French statesman

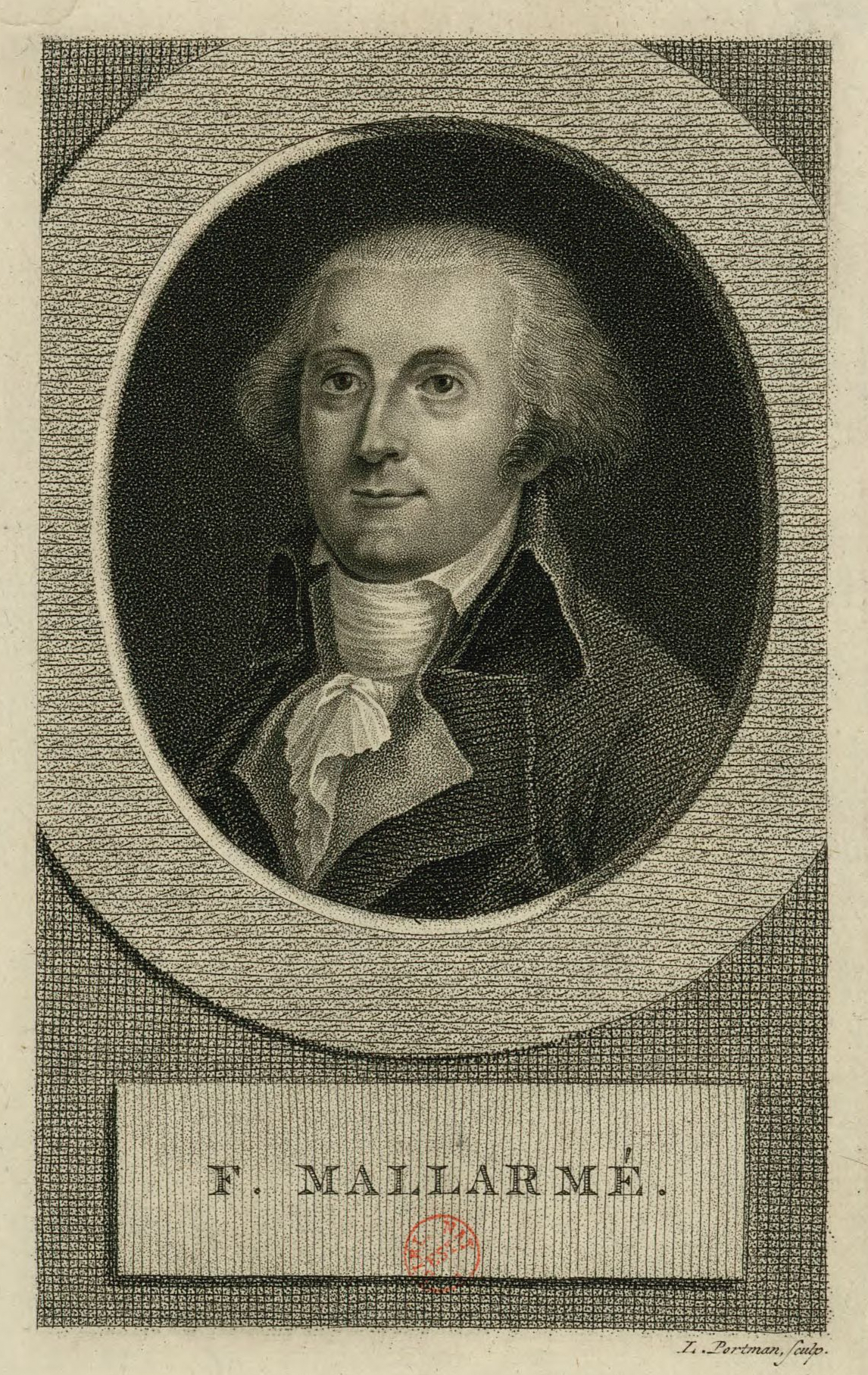

19th President of the National Convention
- In office 30 May 1793 – 13 June 1793
- Preceded by: Maximin Isnard
- Succeeded by: Jean-Marie Collot d'Herbois

Personal details
- Born: 25 February 1755; Nancy, Kingdom of France
- Died: 25 July 1835 (aged 80); Malines, Kingdom of the Netherlands

François-René-Auguste Mallarmé (French pronunciation: [fʁɑ̃swa ʁəne oɡyst malaʁme]; 25 February 1755 – 25 July 1835) was a French statesman of the French Revolution and a supporter of Napoleon Bonaparte and the French Empire. His career is of particular interest because he was among political figures such as Joseph Fouché who at first aggressively supported the Terror, only to betray its leaders (including Maximilien Robespierre) and support the various conservative reactionary régimes that followed. His was a chevalier de l'Empire from 22 November 1808 and a baron de l'Empire from 31 January 1810.

== Early life and mandates ==
Born in Nancy, Lorraine, the son of a lawyer, he was brought up in his father's profession. During the first phase of the French Revolution under the National Assembly he was appointed (1790) procureur-syndic of the district of Pont-à-Mousson in his home department of Meurthe.

== French Revolution ==
Elected (31 August 1791) as a representative of the Département of Meurthe to the Legislative Assembly (1791–1792), and then again elected (4 September 1792) to the National Convention (1792–1795) as a deputy for Meurthe. For Convention he was appointed a member of the committee for finances, and briefly was appointed to the Committee of Public Safety (27 June 1793 – 10 July 1793) by resolution of the National Convention to present his plan for food procurement, but did not join the committee's sessions.

Mallarmé attached himself to the Montagnard faction and voted for the death sentence in the trial of Louis XVI. He served as President of the National Convention (30 May 1793 – 13 June 1793) and presided over the debates about proscription of the Girondin faction, rivals of the Montagnards, but vacated the chair at vital moments. During the Insurrection of 31 May - 2 June 1793 Mallarmé did not chair the evening meeting of 1 June 1793 (Henri Grégoire presided) and chaired only the first part of the session of 2 June 1793, when Marie-Jean Hérault de Séchelles replaced him in chair until the end of the session.

== Terror ==
He served on several missions, including to the Departments of Meurthe, Vosges and Haute-Saône (23 August 1793 – 3 November 1793) which was in support of the levée en masse, to the army of the Rhine (13 September 1793 - 3 November 1793), and again over winter 1793-1794 to establish revolutionary government in Meuse and Moselle. While on the latter mission he earned a notorious reputation for senseless arrests and executions. The most heinous example is when he ordered the execution of the sentence of death decreed by the Revolutionary Tribunal on some young girls at Verdun who had offered flowers to the Prussian soldiers when they entered the town. He thus joined the ranks of Tallien, Fréron, and Fouché as perpetrators of the worst excesses of Terror, and like them found his position growing tenuous. He secured his survival when he spoke against Maximilien Robespierre in the course of the Thermidorian coup (27 July 1794).

== Thermidorian Reaction ==
In the reactionary political order that followed the demise of Robespierre, Mallarmé was sent on mission to Haute-Garonne and Gers (21 August 1794 - 23 October 1794, 6 November 1794 - 15 January 1795). It was an entirely different part of France than he had been involved with heretofore, and similarly, he pursued a very different set of goals, closing down the terrorist Jacobin clubs and setting free prisoners who had been locked away during the Terror as enemies of the state. Alas, his own terrorist activities caught up with him and he was denounced and arrested (1 June 1795), but he was released soon after the amnesty of 26 October 1795.

== Directory, Consulate, and Empire ==
In 1796 he was appointed by the Directory commissioner for the organization of the départements of Dyle and Mont-Tonnerre. Under the Empire, Mallarmé was collector of the droits réunis (sales taxes) at Nancy, and lost his money in 1814 in raising the levée of volunteers.

Appointed sous-préfet of Avesnes during the Hundred Days, he was imprisoned by the Prussian authorities in revenge for the death of the maidens of Verdun, and held for six months in Wesel. He took refuge in Brussels and then Mechelen (with the Cellite monks), and remained in exile during the Bourbon Restoration. He died in Mechelen.
