= Claude-Marie Courmes =

French merchant, shipowner and politician

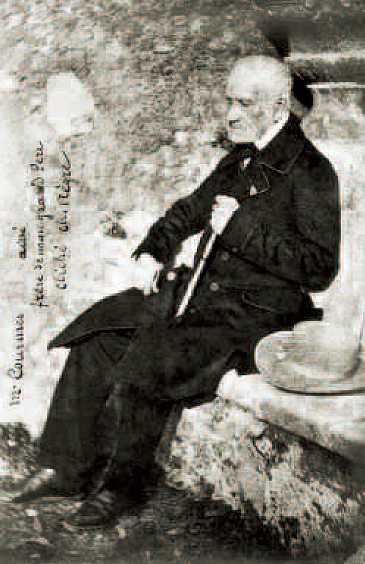
- Claude-Marie Courmes (1770-1865), Photo Charles Nègre (1852).

Mayor of Grasse (1830-1835), Deputy of Var (1831-1834), General Councilor of Var Canton of Grasse-Nord (1833-1836)

Personal details
- Born: Claude-Marie; 9 September 1770 Grasse, Kingdom of France
- Died: 31 January 1865 (aged 94) Grasse, French empire
- Resting place: Cimetière Sainte-Brigitte de Grasse
- Party: (Kingdom of France) Legitimists
- Spouse: Marie Marguerite Justine Isnard
- Relatives: Courmes family
- Occupation: French merchant, shipowner and politician
- Awards: knight of the royal order of the Legion of Honour (26 janvier 1833...)

Claude-Marie Courmes (September 9, 1770, Grasse, Alpes-Maritimes – January 31, 1865, Grasse, Alpes-Maritimes) was a French merchant, shipowner and politician.

Mayor of Grasse from 1830 to 1835, he was elected deputy for Var from July 1831 to May 1834 and General Councilor of Var Canton of Grasse-Nord from 1833 to 1836.

== Family ==
Courmes Coat of Arms

A direct descendant in the agnatic line of the Huguenot captain Luc Courmes (1580, Grasse), Claude-Marie Courmes belonged to an ancient French bourgeoisie [fr].

He married in 1801 Marie Marguerite Justine Isnard (1779+1851), she is the niece of Baron Isnard.

He acquired the old Clapiers-Cabris hotel in Grasse. with his younger brother Antoine Joseph Courmes (1777+1858). The latter is the great-grandfather of the squadron leader Marcel Courmes.

== Trader and shipowner ==
The Courmes houses were represented by two major businesses in Grasse. The soap factory maintains close relations, along with the oil mill and the emerging perfumery The object, the commercial goal sought is vast. Alongside leathers, wheat, oils, flowers, tropical products and private banking will soon appear. The Grasse "merchants" form a caste where family ties and interest pacts are entangled. The Courmes had warehouses in Grasse and Cannes, Claude-Marie Courmes' soap factory is as modern as the Grasse factories. The Courmes house, linked to major Marseille commerce, invests in a commercial fleet and takes shares in the "Tartane Saint-Pierre", "L'avenir" and the "Rose-Louise".

== Political career ==
Courmes was part of a group of young royalists from Grasse, the "Children of the Sun" who notably formed a counter-revolutionary gathering on Ventôse 7, Year V (February 25, 1797) in Grasse on the Place aux Aires where "Le Réveil" was sung. Police report : "Claude [Marie] Courmes fils, merchant, set the tone during the demonstration on the square with cries of "Long live the King! » "Down with the Republic!; we also saw him that day distributing rifles to the participants".

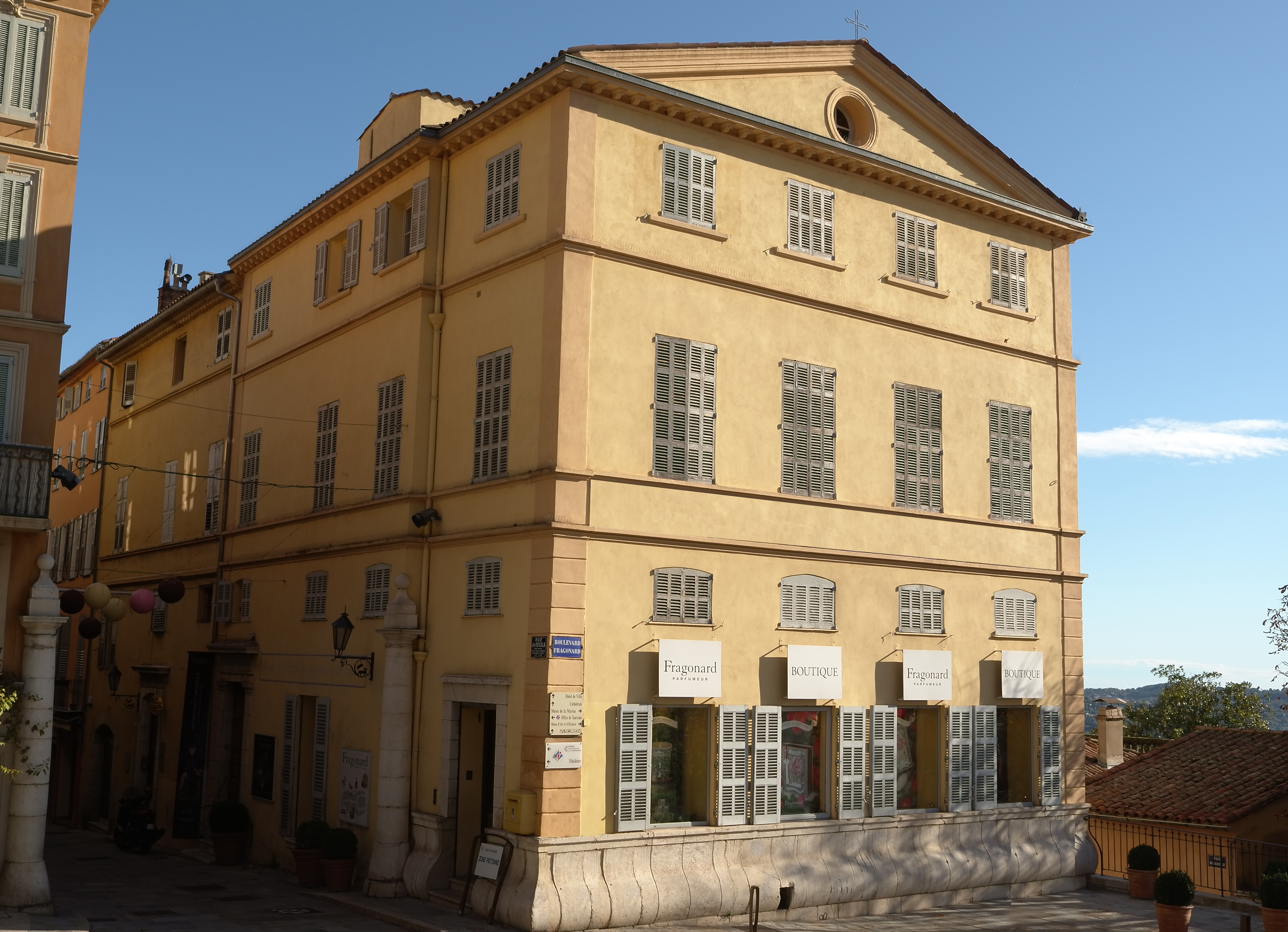
Maison Courmes Ancien hôtel de Clapiers-Cabris

Suspected in Year II, he entered the municipal council after Thermidor, he was prosecuted after the republican coup of Year V (1796–1797 September 4), then he was appointed again to the municipal council under the Empire. Member of the district electoral college in 1804, general councilor of Var from 1811 to 1833, sitting in the majority supporting the July monarchy, he was placed by the government as mayor of Grasse in 1830. François-Xavier Emmanuelli describes him as "A soap maker, moderate royalist for whom the change of dynasty and the limited expansion of the censary regime constituted the final concessions to the new spirit". Confirmed to this position in 1832, elected deputy for Var (Grasse constituency) on July 5, 1831, he took his place in the ranks of the government majority and voted with it until 1834, the year in which he gave up his seat on May 25, 1834.

"Under the Restoration, the prefect of Var, in his report on the voters of 1816, said of him: "A rich merchant, he has means and through the Baron Isnard family to which he belongs, he has a lot of influence. His opinions are those of a member of the center. He is a friend of order, devoted to the government. He is one of the most enlightened men in the general council".

At the end of his life he became blind. Charles Nègre made his photographic portrait in 1852. He died in Grasse at the age of 94.

== National honours ==
- knight of the royal order of the Legion of Honour (26 janvier 1833.)
