= Gourdon, Alpes-Maritimes =

Commune in Provence-Alpes-Côte d'Azur, France

Gourdon Gordon (Occitan)
- Commune
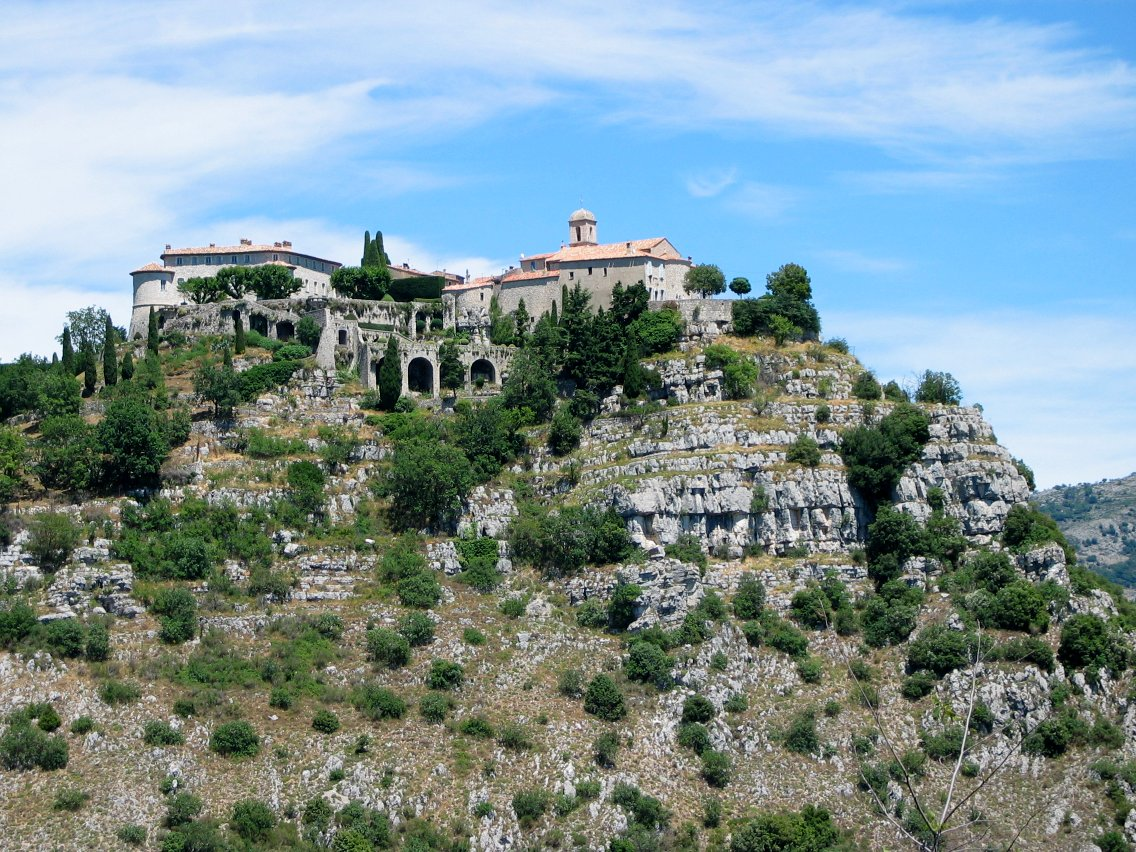
- A general view of Gourdon

- Coat of arms
- Location of Gourdon
- Location within France Location within Provence-Alpes-Côte d'Azur
- Coordinates: 43°43′13″N 6°58′43″E
- Country: France
- Region: Provence-Alpes-Côte d'Azur
- Department: Alpes-Maritimes
- Arrondissement: Grasse
- Canton: Valbonne
- Intercommunality: CA Sophia Antipolis

Government
  - Mayor (2026–32): Serge Barale
- Area^{1}: 22.53 km^{2} (8.70 sq mi)
- Highest elevation: 1,335 m (4,380 ft)
- Lowest elevation: 157 m (515 ft)
- Population (2023): 367
  - Density: 16.3/km^{2} (42.2/sq mi)
- Time zone: UTC+01:00 (CET)
  - Summer (DST): UTC+02:00 (CEST)
- INSEE/Postal code: 06068 /06620
- ^{1} French Land Register data, which excludes lakes, ponds, glaciers > 1 km^{2} (0.386 sq mi or 247 acres) and river estuaries.

Gourdon (French pronunciation: [ɡuʁdɔ̃]; Occitan: Gordon) is a rural commune in the Alpes-Maritimes department in the Provence-Alpes-Côte d'Azur region in Southeastern France. The village of Gourdon is best known for the panoramic views it offers visitors. It is a member of Les Plus Beaux Villages de France (The Most Beautiful Villages of France) Association.

== History and geography ==
In the distant past, this isolated rock was used as a place of refuge and defence. Gourdon, as it appears to us today, gives a good example of a Feudal village. It is built on a peak with impressive slopes down to the river Loup. There is only one entrance, from which you can access the main street. In former times, it was defended by a simple and harmonious Roman gate, that had been demolished at the beginning of the 20th century. Thick, high ramparts close off the North side, which is the only point from which the village can be approached.

== Demographics ==
Historical population
Year	Pop.	±% p.a.
1968	242	—
1975	254	+0.69%
1982	231	−1.35%
1990	294	+3.06%
1999	379	+2.86%
2007	444	+2.00%
2012	416	−1.29%
2017	381	−1.74%
2023	367	−0.62%
Source: INSEE

== Tourism ==
The castle is one of Gourdon's most important features. It has been open to visitors since 1950, and was classed as an historical monument in 1971. Its gardens were designed by André Le Nôtre. Its architecture dates from the ninth century.

== Filmography ==
Certain scenes of Les Misérables (2012) were filmed at Gourdon and in the surrounding area.

== See also ==
- Communes of the Alpes-Maritimes department
