= Hubert de Garde de Vins =

Leader in the Catholic League of France (died 1589)

Hubert de Garde de Vins, (? - 20 November 1589) was a leader of the Catholic League in Provence.

== Biography ==
Hubert de Garde, lord of Vins, was the son of Gaspard de Garde, President of the List of officers in the Parliament of Provence, and the sister of Jean V de Pontevès, Count of Carcès. Involved in the troubles of the wars of religion at a young age, he was imprisoned in 1564 in Aix-en-Provence and released on the orders of Charles IX during his visit to this city the same year. He was cornet of his company during the Battle of Jarnac in 1569. He was squire to the Duke of Anjou, future Henry III, at the siege of La Rochelle (1572–1573). Disappointed by the attitude of Henry III after his return from Poland, he retired to Provence.

Hubert was the main support of his uncle Jean V of Pontevès Count of Carcés, in October 1578 he commanded the Carcist troops who besieged and devastated the village of Trans-en-Provence; the reasons for this attack are in reality not religious but due to the fact that the peasants refused to provide the chores demanded by the lord of the place, Claude de Villeneuve. Hubert de Vins became the leader of the league in Provence after the death of his uncle in 1582. On the death of his brother-in-law the Count of Sault in 1586, he was chosen by the Parliament of Provence as generalissimo of the League army.

In 1587, Hubert de Vins participated in the victory of the Duke of Guise at Auneau; At the head of the leaguers, he led the fight against Jean Louis de Nogaret de La Valette. The league splits into two clans: a French part with the Carcists and a Savoyard part with de Vins and the Countess of Sault. Hubert de Vins is in favor of Savoyard aid in men and money but not of a regular military entry which would have given the Duke of Savoy power in Provence.

On 20 November 1589, Hubert de Vins was killed by a shot from an arquebus in front of Grasse, an account of an eyewitness to the death of Vins. His disappearance opened the way for those who wanted to entrust the Duke of Savoy with the protection of a free and independent Provence.

A funeral was held for him and a mausoleum was erected for him in the Saint-Sauveur cathedral of Aix-en-Provence.

== See also ==
- Catholic League (French)

=== Bibliography ===
- Raoul Busquet, Histoire de Marseille, édition Robert Laffont, Paris, 1978.
- Wolfgang Kaiser, Marseille au temps des troubles (1559-1596), éditions de l’école des hautes études en sciences sociales, Paris, 1991, ISBN 2-7132-0989-7.
- Arlette Playoust, Foi et violence, la Provence au temps de la Réforme, Archives départementales des Bouches-du-Rhône, 1998, ISBN 2-86013-036-5.
- Bernard Lucquiaud, Jean Clotaire Bonnet, Les Editions du Panthéon : Une vie, une passion... et les pierres revivent à Vins. page 82 : Arbre généalogique de Hubert de Garde de Vins. ISBN 978-2-7547-2555-2
