= Maximin Isnard =

French revolutionary

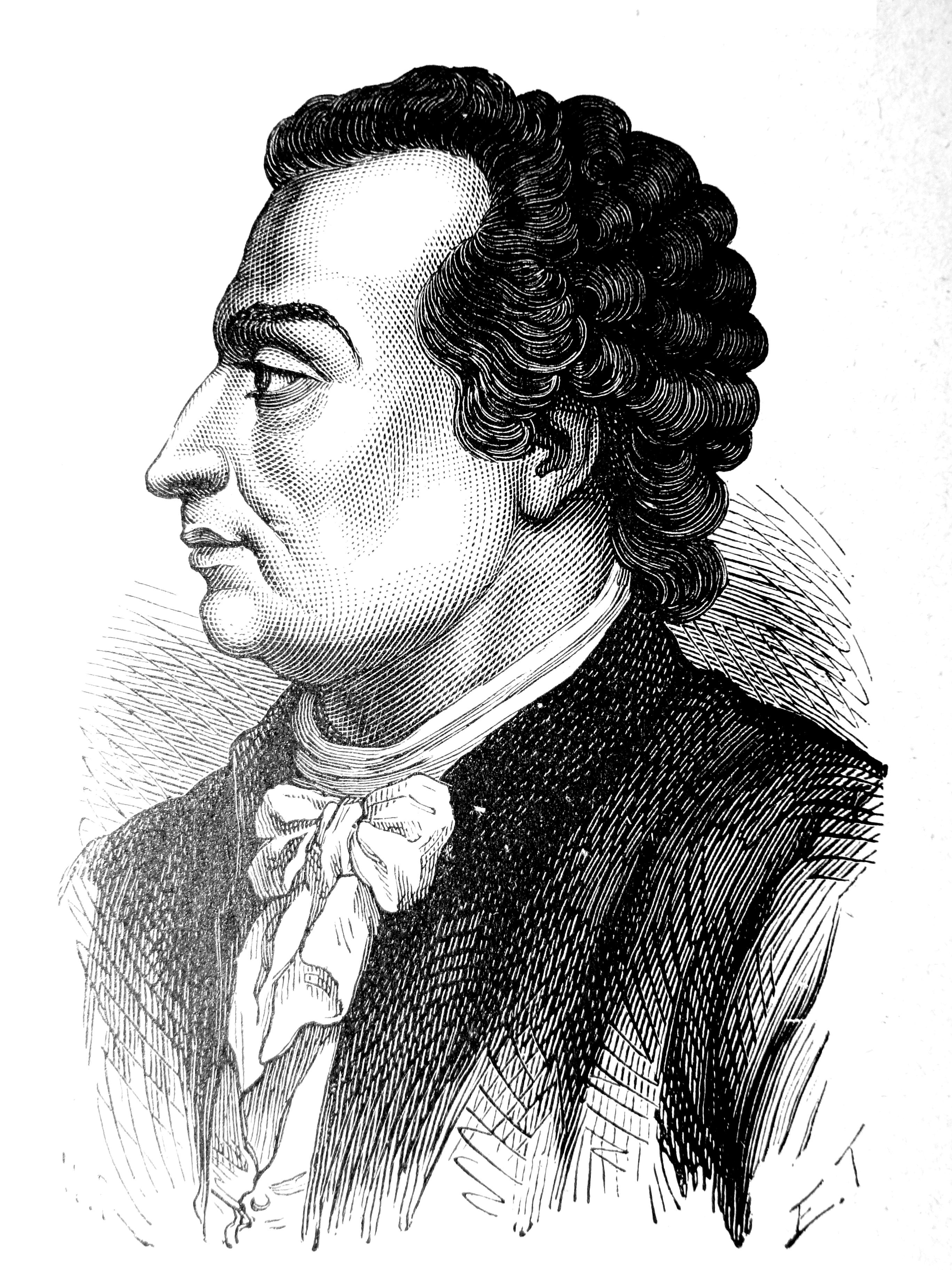

18th President of the National Convention
- In office 16 May 1793 – 30 May 1793
- Preceded by: Jean-Baptiste Boyer-Fonfrède
- Succeeded by: François René Mallarmé

Personal details
- Born: 16 November 1755 Grasse, Kingdom of France
- Died: 12 March 1825 (aged 69) Grasse, Kingdom of France
- Party: Girondins

Maximin Isnard (French pronunciation: [maksimɛ̃ isnaʁ]; 16 November 1755 Grasse, Alpes-Maritimes – 12 March 1825 Grasse), French revolutionary, was a dealer in perfumery at Draguignan when he was elected deputy for the département of the Var to the Legislative Assembly, where he joined the Girondists. As the president of the National Convention Isnard, who had enough of the tyranny of the Paris Commune, threatened the destruction of Paris. He declared that the Convention would not be influenced by any violence and that Paris had to respect the representatives from elsewhere in France. Isnard was asked to give up his seat.

== Before the French Revolution ==
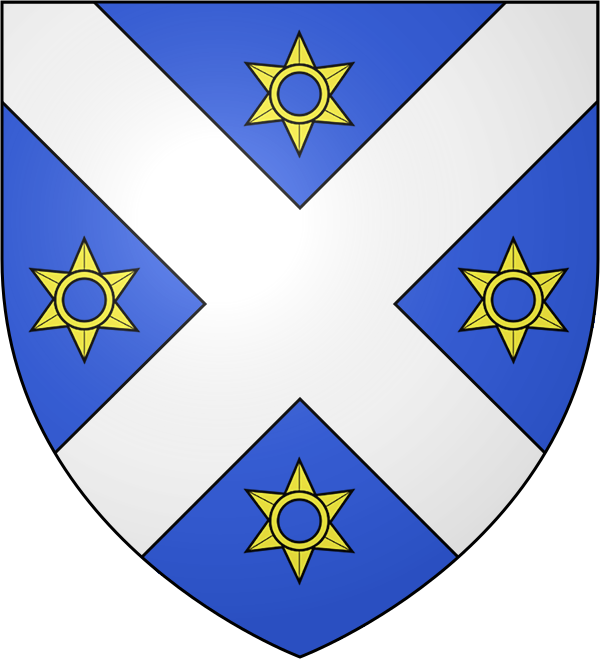
Old Isnard Lord of Deux-Freres Coat of Arms

Born in 1755, he is the youngest son of Maximin Isnard (1731-1799) and Anne Thérèse Fanton, cousin of the Fantons of Andon. He is the grandson (on the paternal line) of Jacques Isnard, merchant curator, was lord of Deux-Frères and Esclapon, and of Claire Courmes, both from old families of the bourgeoisie of Grasse.

His sister Françoise (1722-1805), wife of Antoine Court (they had several children: Honoré, Michel and Joseph Court d'Esclapon and de Fontmichel). His niece, Marie Marguerite Justine Isnard, married Claude-Marie Courmes (1770-1865) in 1801.

He married Madeleine Clérion in 1778. They had a son, Jean-Jacques (1784-1845), Baron Isnard, private receiver of finances, who married Eugénie-Gabrielle Luce in 1813, daughter of the banker Honoré-François Luce. Their grandson Joseph-Honoré (1817-1898) was confirmed in the title of Baron Isnard by letters patent of September 7, 1864.

He became perfumer in Draguignan before opening a factory specializing in silk and soap.

== Legislative Assembly ==
Isnard was quickly a revolutionary in accepting "new ideas" at the beginning of the Revolution, in 1789–1790.

On 9 September 1791, he was elected member of Legislative Assembly by the department of Var, in southeastern of France (district of Draguignan).

Isnard was linked to Brissot and sat at the left of the Assembly. He was very violent in his talks. For example, in his opinion, the French State had to deport all priests who have not accepted the Revolution.

He supported the "brissotins" who wanted a war against foreign countries, in order to strengthen Revolution.

Attacking the court, and the Austrian committee in the Tuileries, he demanded the disbandment of the king's bodyguard, and reproached Louis XVI for infidelity to the constitution. But on 20 June 1792, when the crowd invaded the palace, he was one of the deputies who went to place themselves beside the king to protect him.

== Member of the National Convention ==
Elected to the National Convention in September 1792, he was sent to the army of the North, near Nice, to justify the insurrection; he announced the take of Sospel and went back to Paris in autumn.

He voted for the death of Louis XVI in January 1793 and became a member of the Committee of General Security.

The committee, consisting of 25 members, proved unwieldy, and on 4 April, Isnard presented, on behalf of the Girondist majority, the report recommending a smaller committee of nine, which two days later was established as the Committee of Public Safety.

== President of the National Convention (May 1793) ==
He was elected President of the Convention on 16 May 1793.

Isnard was presiding at the Convention when a deputation of the commune of Paris came to demand that Jacques René Hébert should be set at liberty, and he made the famous reply: "If by these insurrections, continually renewed, it should happen that the principle of national representation should suffer, I declare to you in the name of France that soon people will search the banks of the Seine to see if Paris has ever existed"

== Flight ==
On 2 June 1793 he offered his resignation as representative of the people, but was not comprised in the decree by which the Convention determined upon the arrest of twenty-nine Girondists. On 3 October, however, his arrest was decreed along with that of several other Girondist deputies who had left the Convention and were fomenting civil war in the departments.

== 1794–1795 ==
Initially proscribed during the Thermidorian Reaction, he was allowed to return to the Convention on 4 December 1794.

Seating to the Right, he became an adversary of more extremist revolutionaries.

In May 1795, he was sent to the département of Bouches-du-Rhône to uncover and prosecute fleeing Jacobins, which led him to being suspected of royalist sympathies.

== 1795–1797 ==
On 13 October 1795, now regarded as a royalist, he was elected deputy for the Var to the Council of Five Hundred, where he played a very insignificant role.

In 1797 he retired to Draguignan.

== End of life ==
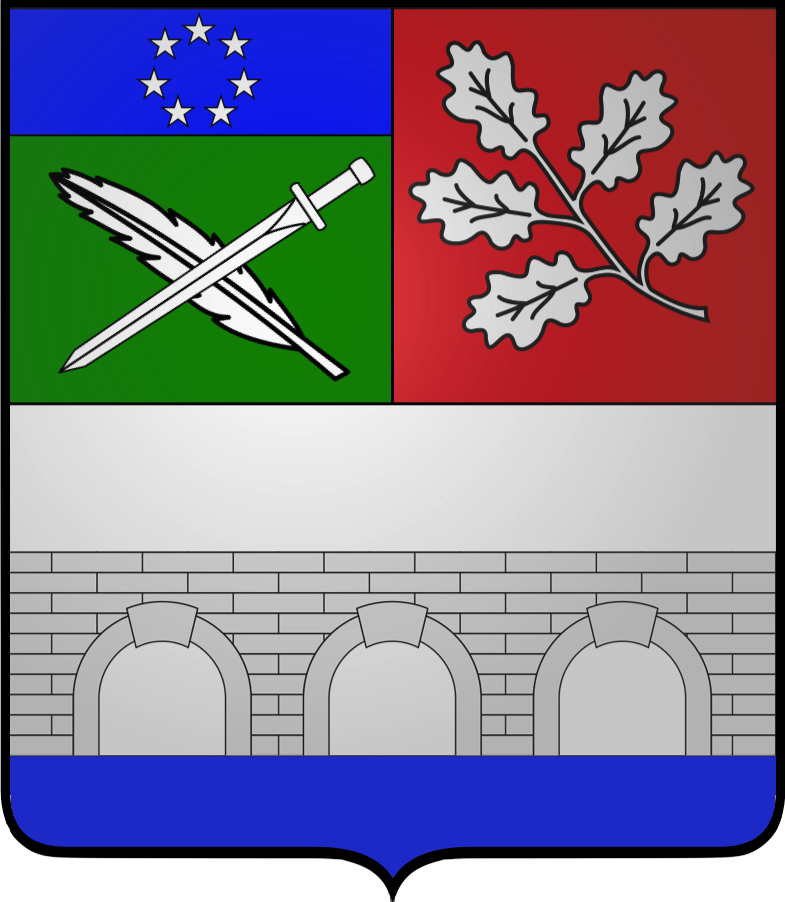
Baron Isnard Coat of Arms

In 1802, he published a pamphlet titled De l'immortalité de l'âme ("Immortality of Soul"), in which he praised Catholicism, and in 1804 another pamphlet, Réflexions relatives au sénatus-consulte du 28 floréal an XII, an enthusiastic apology for the Empire.

He was a supporter of Napoléon Bonaparte, who named him Baron in 1813.

Upon the restoration he professed such royalist sentiments that he was not disturbed, in spite of the 1816 law proscribing members of the Convention who had voted to execute the king.

In 1825, he died in Grasse, in a deep anonymity.

See FA Aulard, Les Orateurs de la Legislative et de la Convention (Paris, 2nd ed., 1906).

== See also ==
- French Revolution
