= Gréolières =

Commune in Provence-Alpes-Côte d'Azur, France

Gréolières Greulieras (Occitan)
- Commune
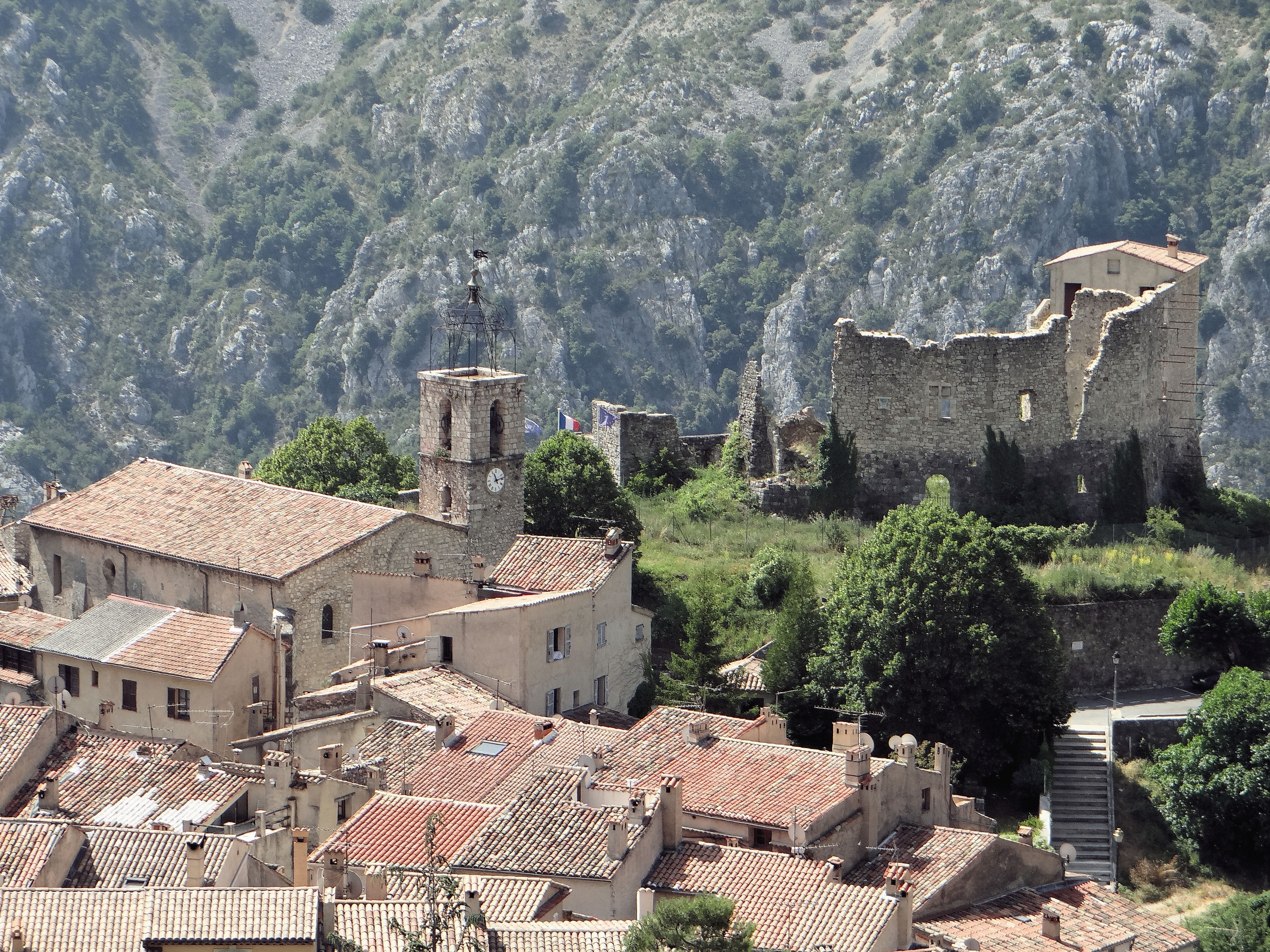
- The church of Saint-Pierre in Gréolières, with the ruins of the former castle to the right

- Coat of arms
- Location of Gréolières
- Location within France Location within Provence-Alpes-Côte d'Azur
- Coordinates: 43°47′48″N 6°56′39″E
- Country: France
- Region: Provence-Alpes-Côte d'Azur
- Department: Alpes-Maritimes
- Arrondissement: Grasse
- Canton: Valbonne
- Intercommunality: CA Sophia Antipolis

Government
  - Mayor (2026–32): Marc Malfatto
- Area^{1}: 52.67 km^{2} (20.34 sq mi)
- Elevation: 810 m (2,660 ft)
- Highest elevation: 1,778 m (5,833 ft)
- Lowest elevation: 492 m (1,614 ft)
- Population (2023): 631
  - Density: 12.0/km^{2} (31.0/sq mi)
- Time zone: UTC+01:00 (CET)
  - Summer (DST): UTC+02:00 (CEST)
- INSEE/Postal code: 06070 /06620
- ^{1} French Land Register data, which excludes lakes, ponds, glaciers > 1 km^{2} (0.386 sq mi or 247 acres) and river estuaries.

Gréolières (French pronunciation: [ɡʁe.ɔljɛʁ]; Occitan: Greulieras; Italian: Agrioleri, formerly) is a rural commune in the Alpes-Maritimes department in the Provence-Alpes-Côte d'Azur region in Southeastern France. It is part of Préalpes d'Azur Regional Natural Park.

== Demographics ==
Historical population
Year	Pop.	±% p.a.
1968	250	—
1975	292	+2.24%
1982	311	+0.90%
1990	380	+2.54%
1999	455	+2.02%
2007	535	+2.05%
2012	589	+1.94%
2017	586	−0.10%
2023	631	+1.24%
Source: INSEE

== In popular culture ==
The commune was featured in the 1995 James Bond movie GoldenEye, with Bond driving on the D2 road prior to his arrival in Monte Carlo, Monaco.

== Ski resort ==
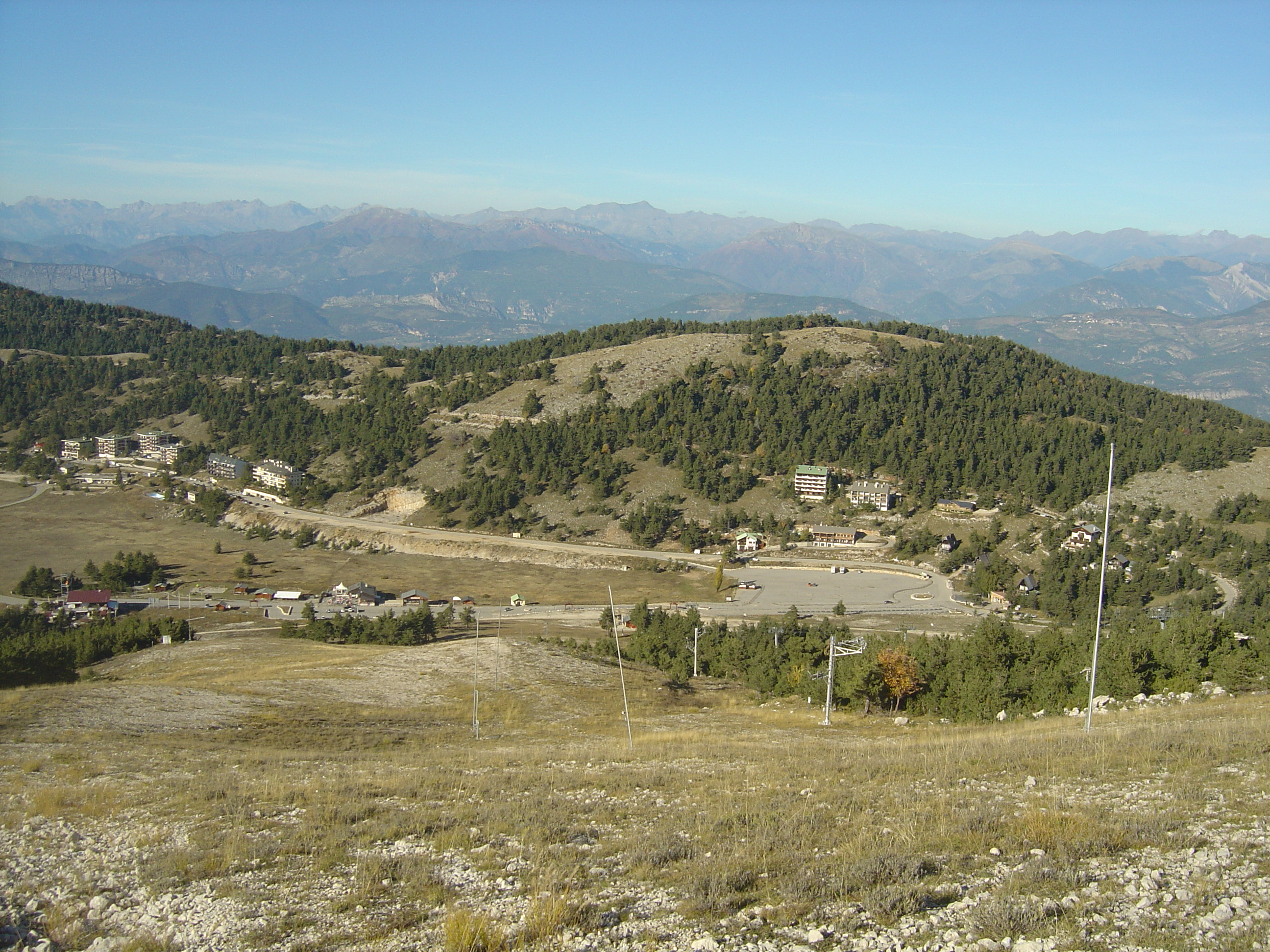
Ski resort Gréolières-les-Neiges or Gréolières 1400m

The ski resort Gréolières-les-Neiges, or Gréolières 1400m, belongs to the town. Two wrecks of jet fighters, and Vought F-8 Crusader and an Aero L-39 Albatros, are parked there for unknown reason and purpose.

== Sport ==
The 2024 Paris–Nice cycling stage race passed through on 8 March.

== See also ==
- Communes of the Alpes-Maritimes department
