= Tourrettes-sur-Loup =

Commune in Provence-Alpes-Côte d'Azur, France

- Commune
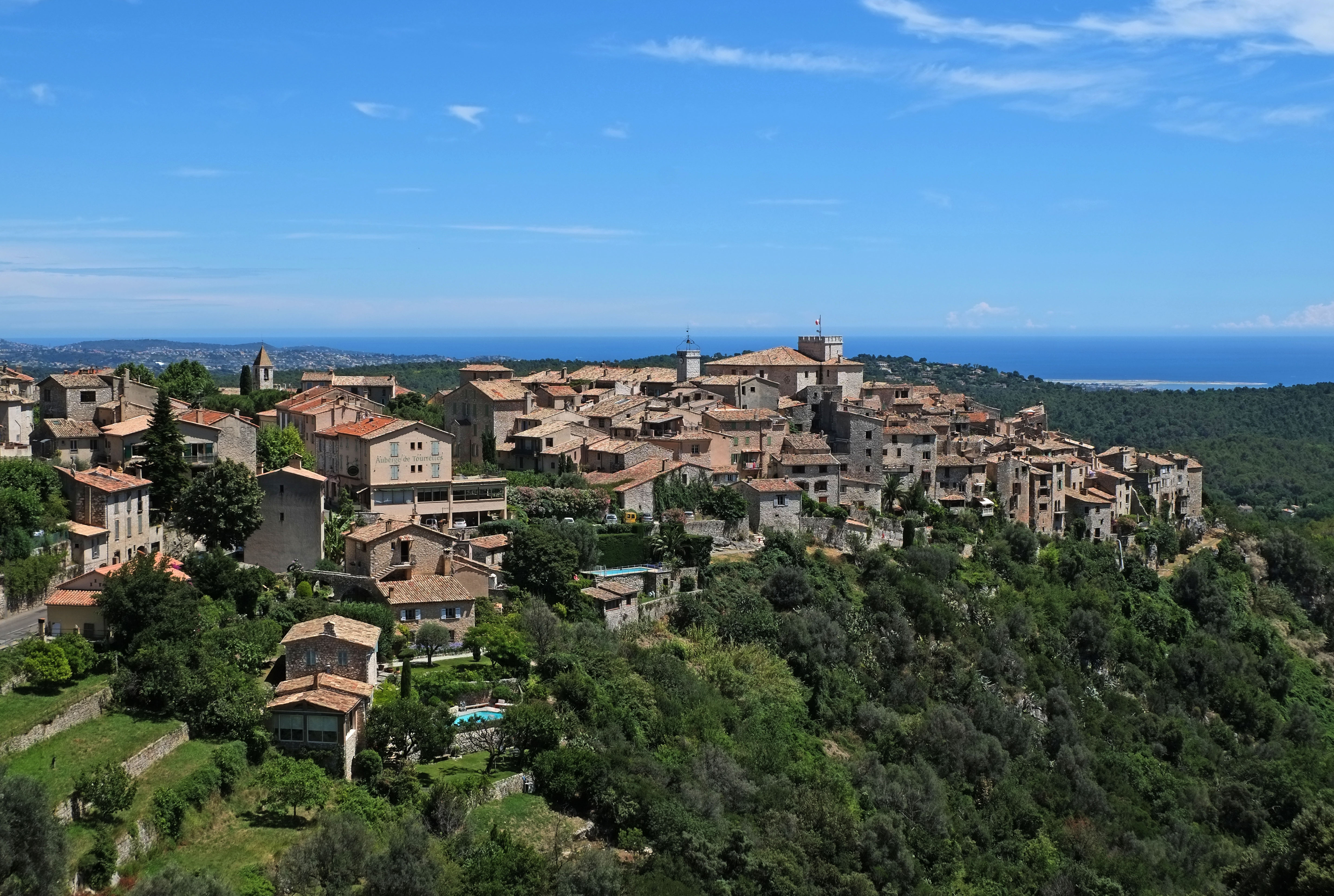
- A view of the village of Tourrettes-sur-Loup from the Quenières road

- Coat of arms
- Location of Tourrettes-sur-Loup
- Location within France Location within Provence-Alpes-Côte d'Azur
- Coordinates: 43°43′01″N 7°03′38″E
- Country: France
- Region: Provence-Alpes-Côte d'Azur
- Department: Alpes-Maritimes
- Arrondissement: Grasse
- Canton: Valbonne
- Intercommunality: CA Sophia Antipolis

Government
  - Mayor (2026–32): Frédéric Poma
- Area^{1}: 29.28 km^{2} (11.31 sq mi)
- Elevation: 400 m (1,300 ft)
- Highest elevation: 1,246 m (4,088 ft)
- Lowest elevation: 47 m (154 ft)
- Population (2023): 4,165
  - Density: 142.2/km^{2} (368.4/sq mi)
- Time zone: UTC+01:00 (CET)
  - Summer (DST): UTC+02:00 (CEST)
- INSEE/Postal code: 06148 /06140
- ^{1} French Land Register data, which excludes lakes, ponds, glaciers > 1 km^{2} (0.386 sq mi or 247 acres) and river estuaries.

Tourrettes-sur-Loup (French pronunciation: [tuʁɛt syʁ lu]; Occitan: Torretas de Lop) is a commune in the Alpes-Maritimes department in southeastern France. It has been called Tourrettes-sur-Loup ever since the early twentieth century although prior to that it was known as Tourrettes-les-Vence, a name that arose in the sixteenth century and lasted until the French revolution. This is an artisan's village situated near Vence. It features medieval and Romanesque buildings.

Situated 14 km from the Mediterranean coast, between Vence and Grasse, Tourrettes-sur-Loup is predominantly a tourist village however it does have a rich historical background.

Tourrettes-sur-Loup has a population of just over 4,000 residents. Inhabitants of the village are known as Tourrettans in French.

== Geography ==
Tourrettes-sur-Loup is a medieval village, perched on a rocky spur, situated on the southern slope of the Puy de Tourrettes. The slope of the land leads directly to the loup valley and gorges around the area.

== Economy ==
The village is predominantly a tourist centre. The medieval village is well renowned for its arts and crafts such as weaving, painting, pottery jewelry and sculpture, all of which are created in the village by the residents. There are forty artisans all of whom live in the village, who group together and contribute to the economy of the population.

The local economy is based on:

- The culture of violet
- Confectionery (all made in the village):
  - crystallized flowers, candied fruit, etc..
- Arts and crafts
- The production of organic goat cheese (from Pic de Courmettes)
- Beekeeping
- Agriculture and farming: the local production of vegetables
- Tourism:
  - Hotels, restaurants, guest rooms, furnished and campsites

The tax rate in 2008 and 2009 was 13.23% which, amongst the 193 most commonly taxed villages, ranks 53rd.

== Sites and monuments ==
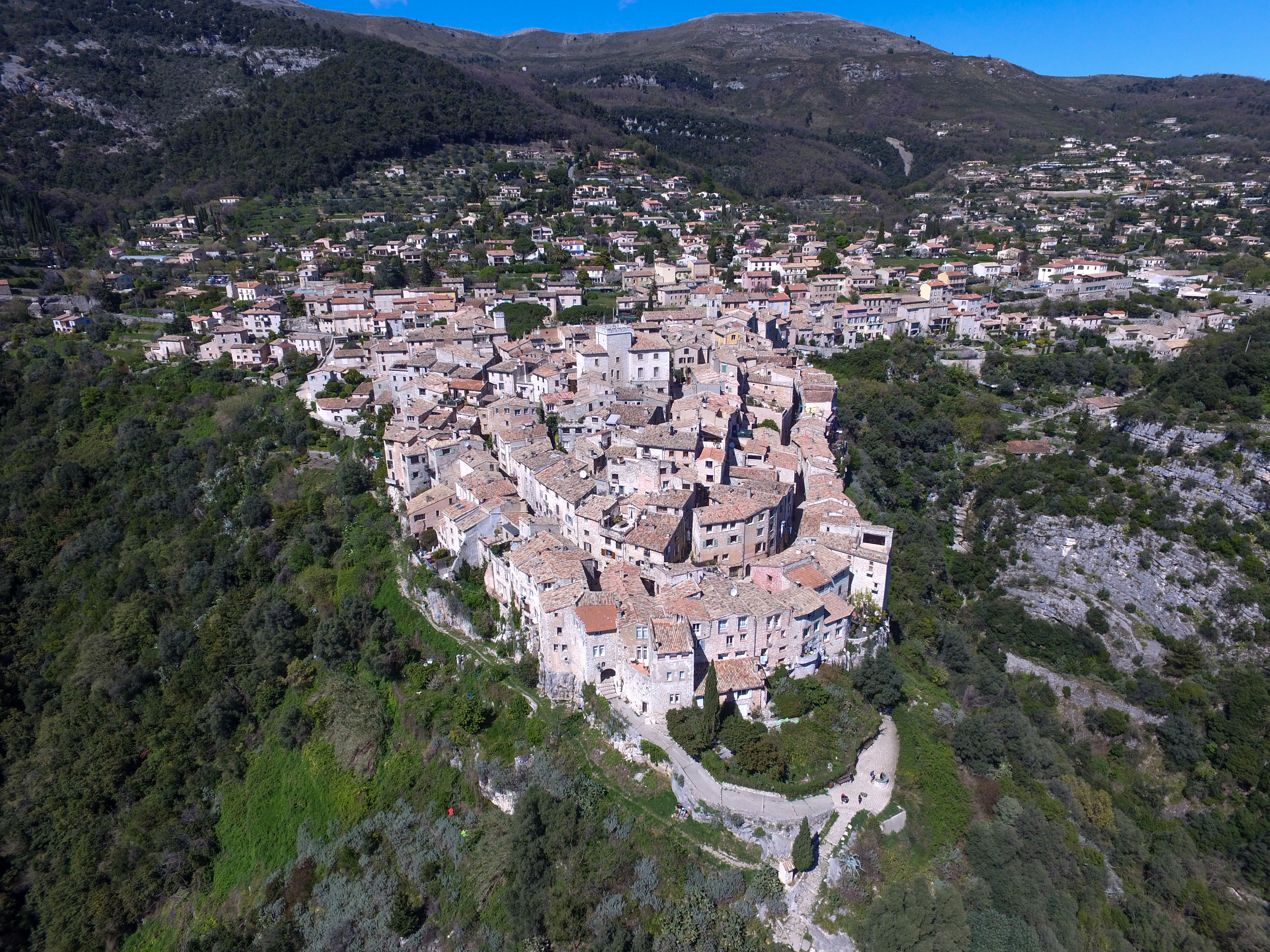
Aerial view of the village

Tourrettes-sur-Loup is home to many historically significant monuments and structures, for example:

- The church of St. Gregory: Built in the fifteenth century, the church holds two altar pieces, carved and gilded statues (fifteenth century) and other works from the fifteenth and sixteenth centuries.
- The chapel of St. John: Was restored in 2005
- Ear (Ear Gaia): A stone, ear-shaped construction about 40m long and 10m wide. The ear is no longer open to the public seeing as the city has recently authorized the building of a villa on the site.
- La bastide aux violets: a museum dedicated to the violet flower which was opened on 6 March 2010.

== Architecture ==
With fortified architectural qualities, the houses of Tourrettes-sur-Loup form a general uphill structure creating ramparts. The houses are situated around a half moon circuit that forms the central route for the village.

== Access ==
=== By road ===
- From Aix-en-Provence (eastbound) exit 47 Villeneuve-Loubet
- From Italy, Monaco or Nice (westbound) exit 48 Cagnes-sur-Mer
- Follow the signs to Vence, then D2210 Tourrettes-sur-Loup.

=== By rail ===
The nearest station is Cagnes-sur-Mer, 15 km (9 miles) from the village.

=== By air ===
The nearest airport is Nice Côte d'Azur which is 21 km (13 miles) from the village.

=== Distances from Tourrettes-sur-loup ===
- Vence 6 km (4 miles)
- Cagnes-sur-Mer 14 km (9 miles)
- Grasse 20 km (12 miles)
- Antibes 24 km (15 miles)
- Nice 27 km (17 miles)
- Cannes 37 km (23 miles)
- Monaco 49 km (30 miles)

== Activities ==
There are a number of activities that are available at the village and in neighboring villages and areas: • cycling : ‘‘‘Tourrettes-sur-Loup’’’ is very popular with cyclists and there are various biking routes near the village. • boules : ‘‘Tourrettans’’ and tourists play boules in the ‘‘Place de la Liberation’’. • paragliding • hang-gliding • canyoning • climbing • fishing • horseriding • skiing : The nearest ski station is at Gréolières-les-Neiges which is 39 km (24 miles) away. • beaches : The nearest beach is at Cagnes-sur-Mer which is just 14 km (9 miles) from the village.

== Violet festival ==
Tourrettes-sur-Loup holds an annual violet festival in March. The village is decorated with violets, mimosa and other flowers, with the local cafés and restaurants providing edible violet specialities for the weekend. A farmers market including craft stalls is set up in the village square, with games for children. Traditionally there is a parade of flower-covered floats in the afternoon which culminates in a Battle of the Flowers - the riders of the floats pull all the flowers off and toss them to the crowd.

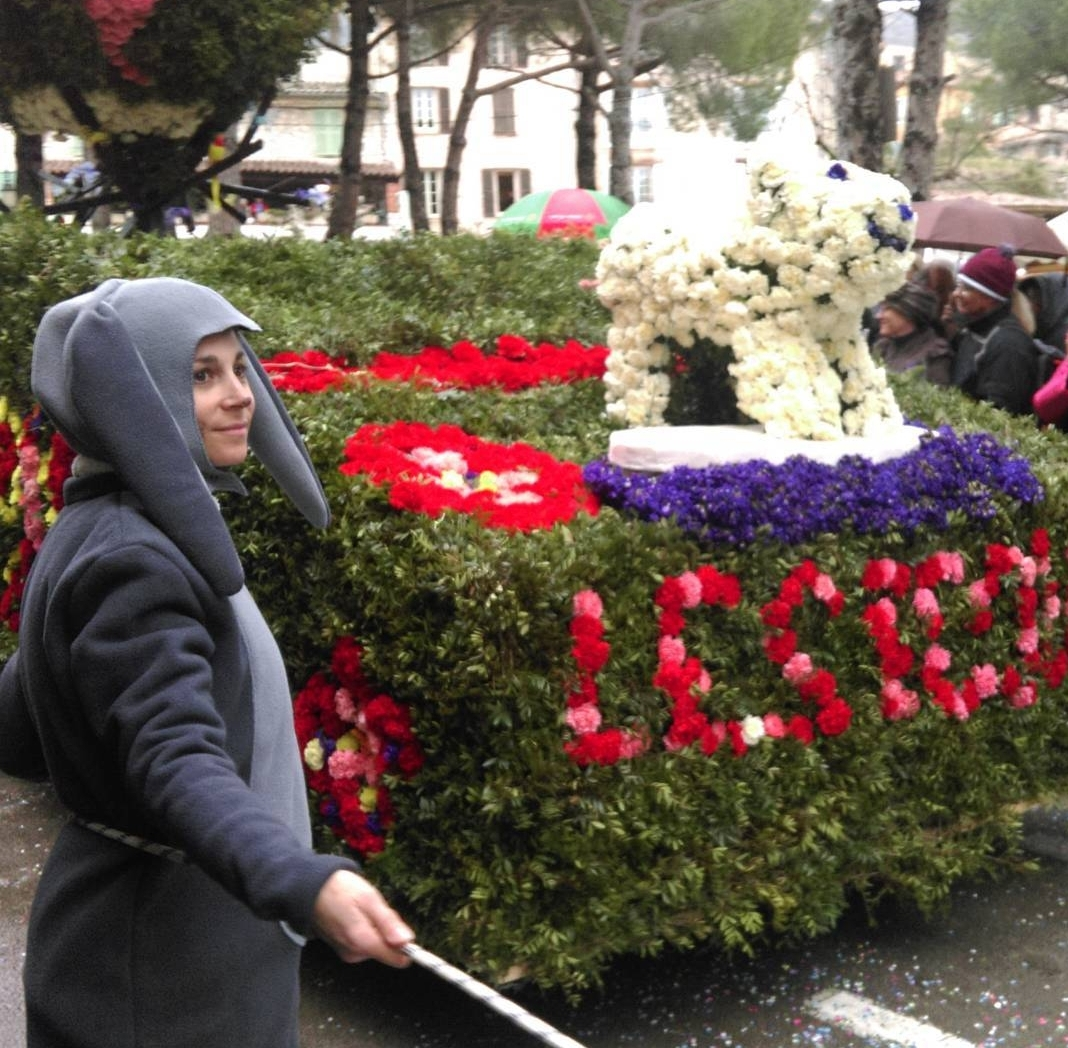
The Parade of the Flowers

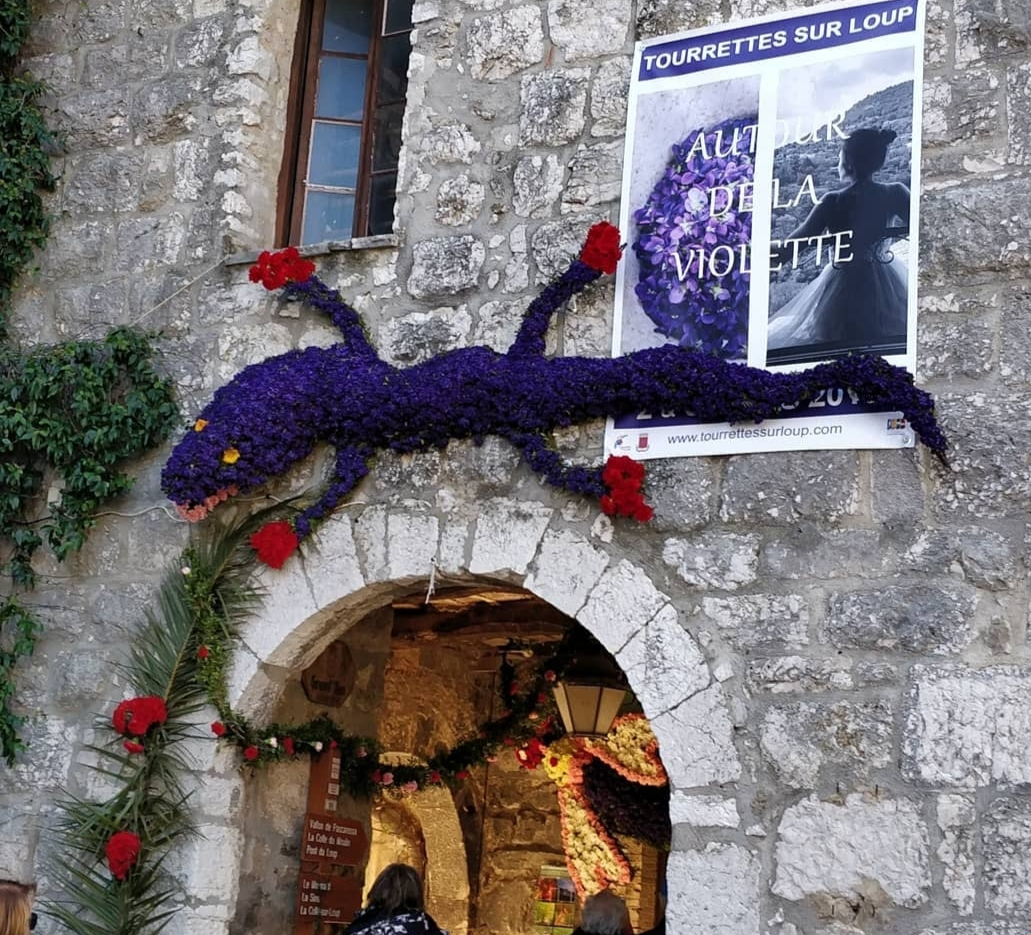
Violet festival decorations

== Population ==
Historical population

Year	Pop.	±% p.a.
1793	1,169	—
1821	1,115	−0.17%
1846	1,211	+0.33%
1872	979	−0.81%
1901	1,049	+0.24%
1926	933	−0.47%
1946	734	−1.19%
1962	1,115	+2.65%
1968	1,548	+5.62%

Year	Pop.	±% p.a.
1975	2,267	+5.60%
1982	2,727	+2.67%
1990	3,449	+2.98%
1999	3,870	+1.29%
2007	4,312	+1.36%
2012	3,993	−1.53%
2017	3,999	+0.03%
2023	4,165	+0.68%

Source: EHESS and INSEE (1968-2023)

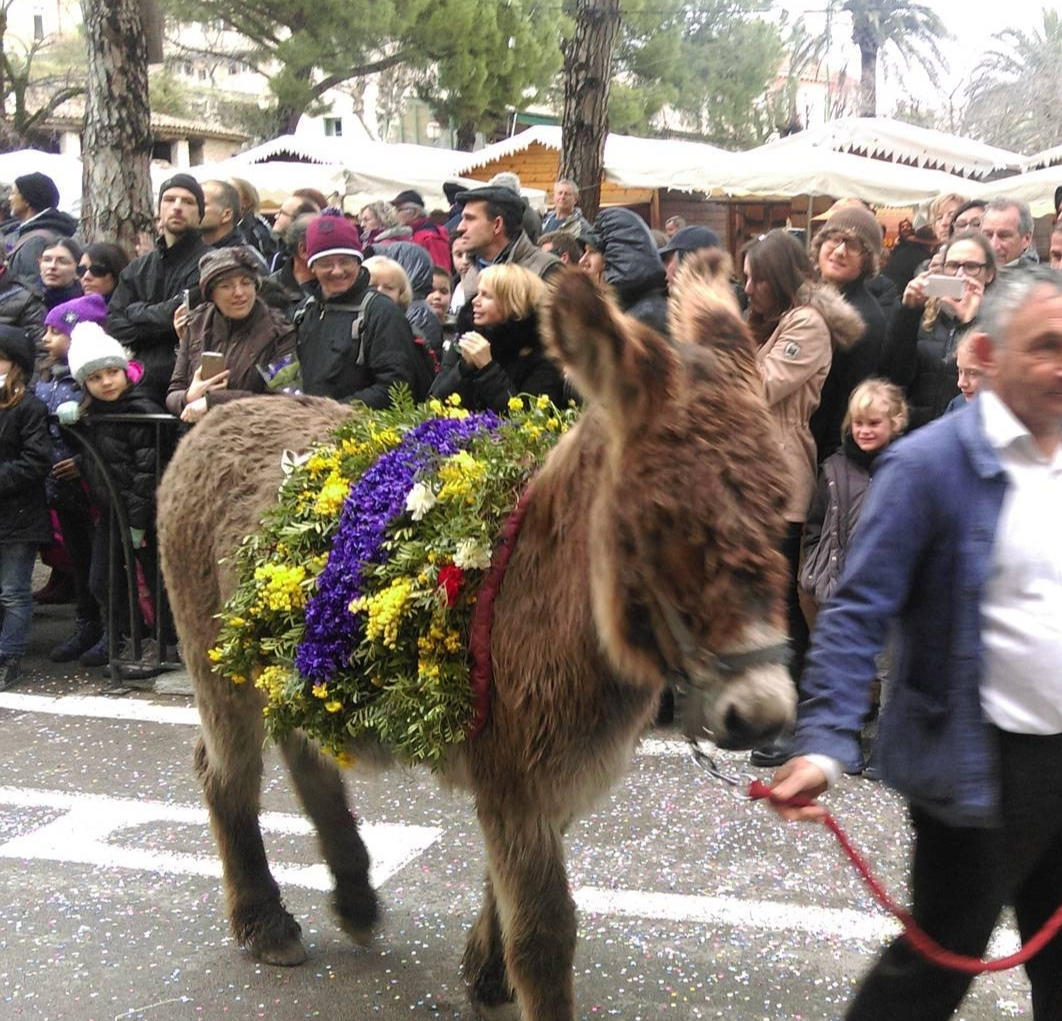
Violet festival parade

== See also ==
- Communes of the Alpes-Maritimes department
