= Éric Pauget =

French politician (born 1970)

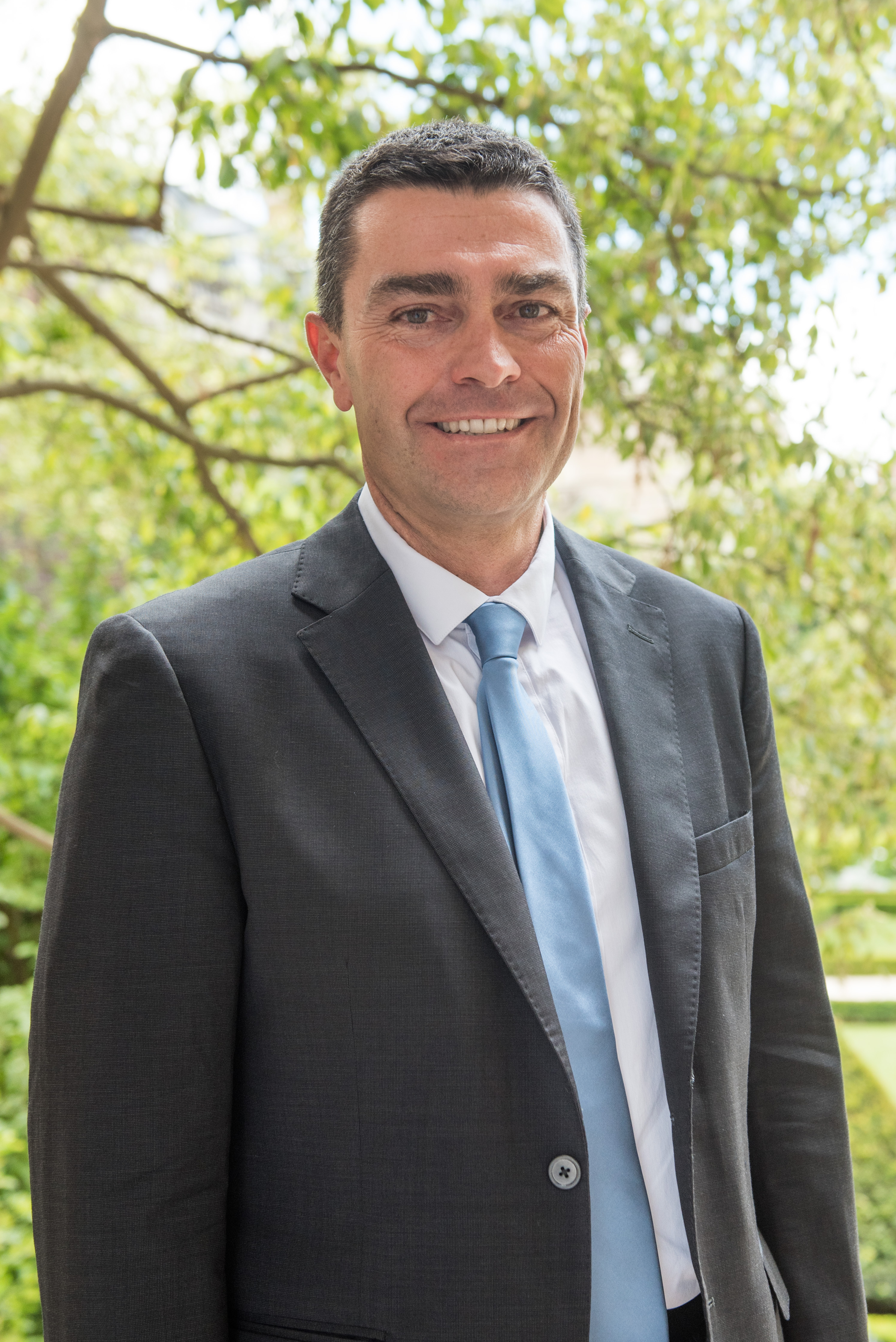

Member of the National Assembly for Alpes-Maritimes's 7th constituency
- Incumbent
- Assumed office 21 June 2017
- Preceded by: Jean Leonetti

Vice-President of Soyons libres
- Incumbent
- Assumed office February 2018
- President: Valérie Pécresse

Personal details
- Born: 18 August 1970 (age 55) Antibes, France
- Party: The Republicans (2015–present)
- Other political affiliations: Rally for the Republic (1995–2002); Union for a Popular Movement (2002–2005)
- Occupation: Camping manager
- Website: ericpauget.fr

Éric Pauget (French pronunciation: [eʁik poʒɛ]; born 18 August 1970) is a French politician who has represented the 7th constituency of the Alpes-Maritimes department in the National Assembly since 2017. He is a member of The Republicans (LR).

== Political career ==
Pauget held a seat in the Departmental Council of Alpes-Maritimes from 2001 until his resignation in 2017, first for the canton of Antibes-Biot until 2015, then for the canton of Antibes-3. He held one of the departmental council's vice presidencies from 2015 until 2017 under the presidency of Éric Ciotti.

Since 1995, he has been a municipal councillor of Antibes. He served as a deputy mayor from 2001 to 2017; he was first deputy mayor from 2012.

== Political career ==
In parliament, Pauget serves on the Committee on Economic Affairs. In addition to his committee assignments, he is part of the French-Israeli Parliamentary Friendship Group.

In 2018, Pauget joined the leadership of Soyons Libres as a vice president (while remaining a member of The Republicans), a minor party of which he has been a member since 2017 and where he is in charge of relations with the National Assembly.

In the run-up to the Republicans’ 2022 convention, Pauget endorsed Éric Ciotti as the party's chairman. In the Republicans' 2025 leadership election, he endorsed Laurent Wauquiez to succeed Ciotti as the party's new chair.

== Political positions ==
In 2021, Pauget tabled a bill to ban bullfighting in France. A few months later, he sponsored a bill to have prison inmates pay part of the cost of their incarceration.

== See also ==
- 2017 French legislative election
