= Château de Roquefort-les-Pins =

Ruin in Alpes-Maritimes, France

Coordinates: 43°41′12″N 7°04′08″E

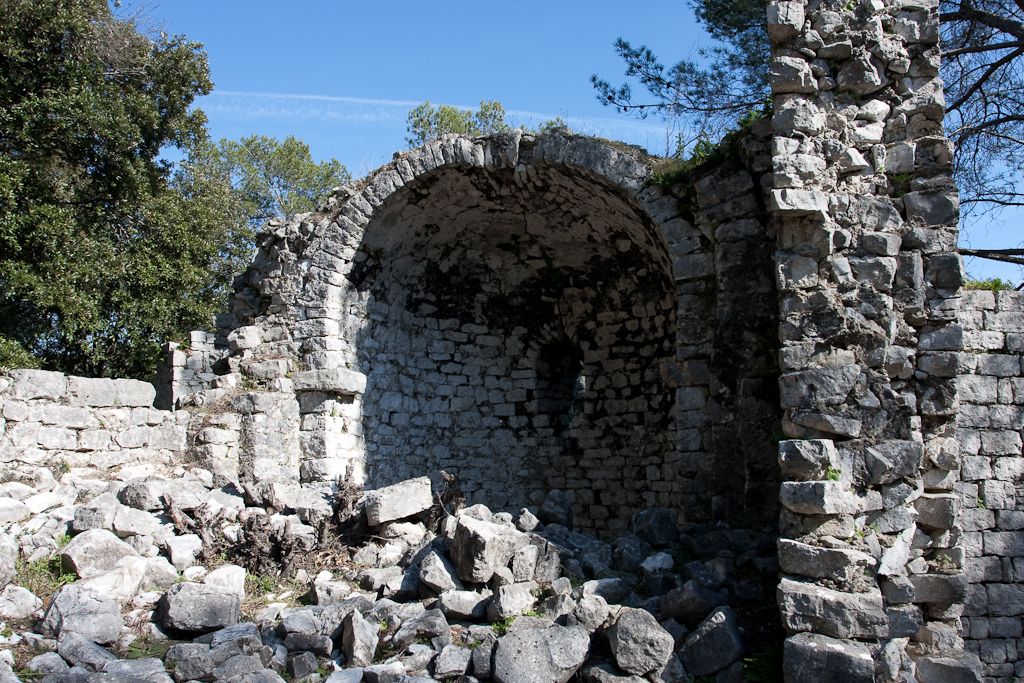
Remains of the 12th century Romanesque chapel

The Château de Roquefort-les-Pins is a ruined castle located at the summit of a hill in Castellas in the commune of Roquefort-les-Pins in the Alpes-Maritimes département of France. According to local tradition, it was the refuge of Féraud de Cabris, a monk and prior, whose men terrorised the whole of Provence, causing Robert, Count of Savoy, to destroy the castle.

== History ==
The castle was destroyed in 1341 in dramatic circumstances, as witnessed by an ancient text reproduced on a panel on the site:

Féraud de Cabris, moine et prieur de Rochefort, ayant rassemblé un grand nombre de gens d'armes dans les châteaux de Rochefort et de La Garde, faisait de grandes vilenies contre les voisins et passans, et, ayant grossi ses troupes, feust assiéger le chasteau de Draguignan, où il mist le feu et brusla ceux qui estoient dedans et continuant ses courses et violences par toute la Provence, le Roy Robert donna commission à la communauté de Grasse de s'en saisir ou s'en défaire; lesquels étant allés à Rochefort pour exécuter l'ordre du Roy, furent repoussés et maltraités, ce que le Roy ayant appris, donna la commission à la communauté de Saint Paul; lesquels, ayant espié le temps que son monde estoit allé à la petite guerre et que lui restoit avec peu de gens, tous les habitants de Saint Paul, hommes, femmes et enfants, y furent, investir le chasteau de touts côtés et, s'estans mis en défence, ne peut empescher qu'ils ne missent le feu au chasteau, et qu'il ne feust bruslé avec touts ceux qui estoient dedans, comme il avait fait à Draguignan.	Féraud de Cabris, monk and prior of Rochefort, having gathered a large number of men-at-arms in the castles of Rochefort and La Garde, committed great villainies against the neighbours and peasants, and, having enlarged his troops, besieged the castle of Draguignan, where he set fire and burned those who were inside and continuing his rampages and violence throughout all Provence, King Robert gave a commission to the community of Grasse to see or demolish it; they, having gone to Rochefort to carry out the order of the King, were pushed back and maltreated, which the King having learned, he gave the commission to the community of Saint Paul; they, having seen the time when his world had gone to the small war and that he stayed with few people, all the inhabitants of Saint Paul, men, women and children, went there, to invest the castle from all sides and, being put in defence, he could not prevent them setting fire to the castle, and that it was burnt with all those who were inside, as he did in Draguignan.

== See also ==
- List of castles in France
