= Valbonne =

Commune in Provence-Alpes-Côte d'Azur, France

- Commune
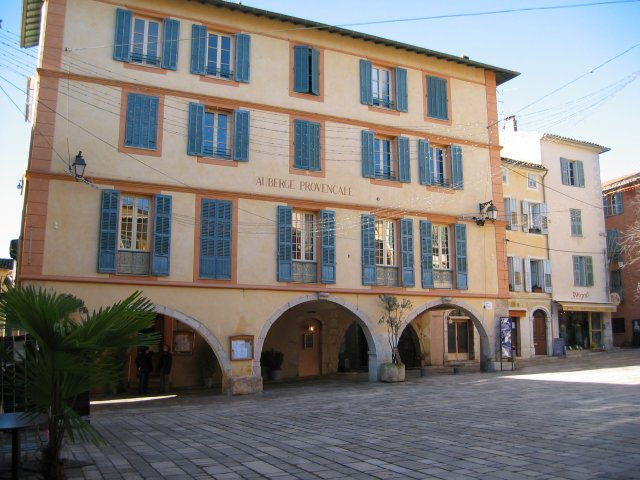
- Main square

- Flag Coat of arms
- Location of Valbonne
- Location within France Location within Provence-Alpes-Côte d'Azur
- Coordinates: 43°38′33″N 7°00′34″E
- Country: France
- Region: Provence-Alpes-Côte d'Azur
- Department: Alpes-Maritimes
- Arrondissement: Grasse
- Canton: Valbonne
- Intercommunality: CA Sophia Antipolis

Government
  - Mayor (2026–32): Joseph Cesaro
- Area^{1}: 18.97 km^{2} (7.32 sq mi)
- Elevation: 200 m (660 ft)
- Highest elevation: 302 m (991 ft)
- Lowest elevation: 75 m (246 ft)
- Population (2023): 11,939
  - Density: 629.4/km^{2} (1,630/sq mi)
- Demonym: Valbonnais
- Time zone: UTC+01:00 (CET)
  - Summer (DST): UTC+02:00 (CEST)
- INSEE/Postal code: 06152 /06560
- ^{1} French Land Register data, which excludes lakes, ponds, glaciers > 1 km^{2} (0.386 sq mi or 247 acres) and river estuaries.

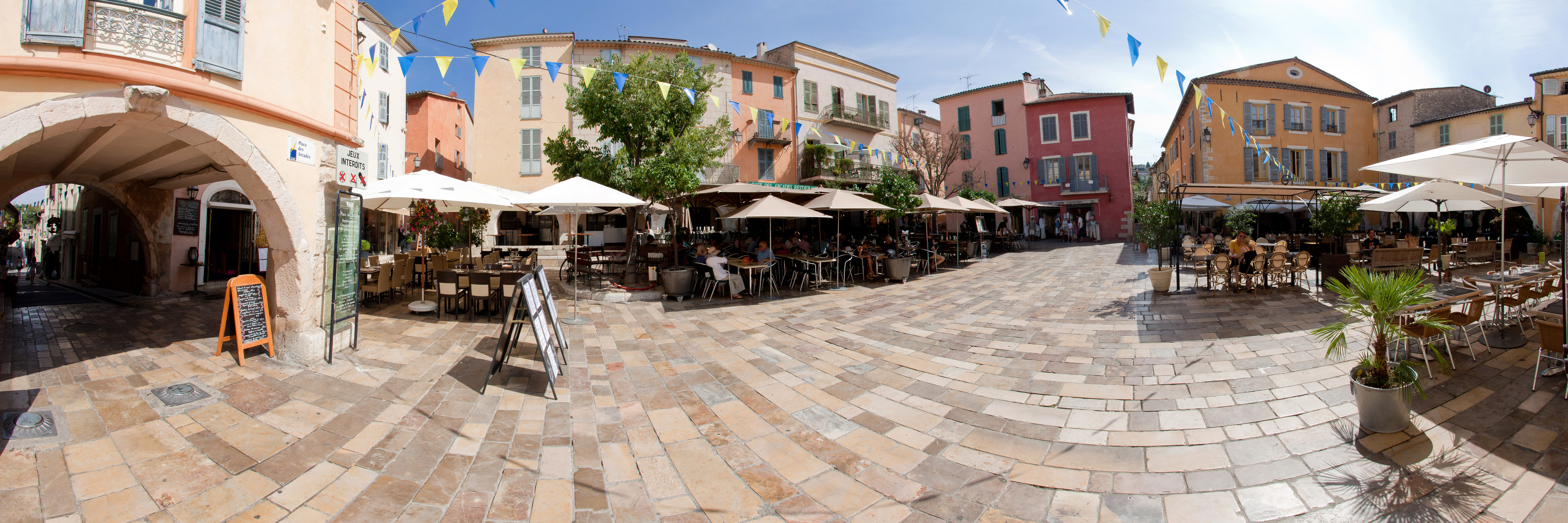
La place des Arcades.

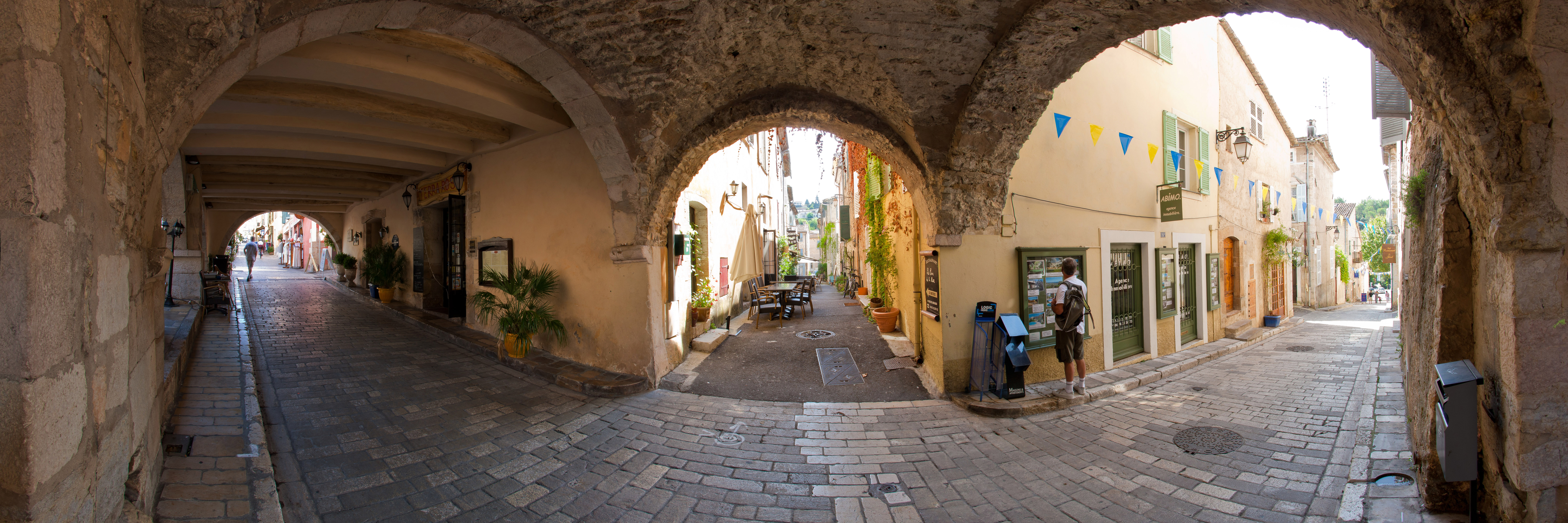
Les arcades.

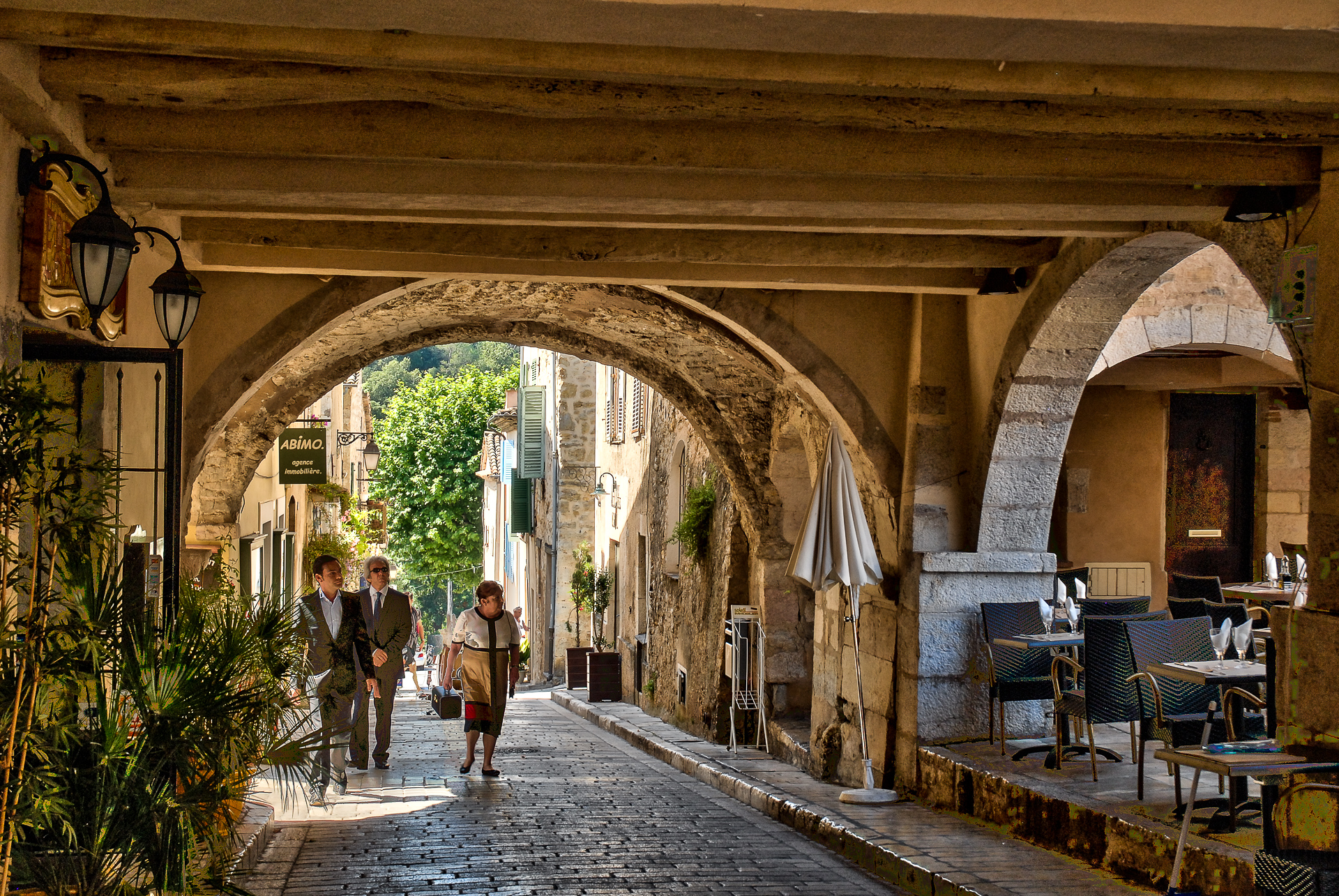
Les arcades.

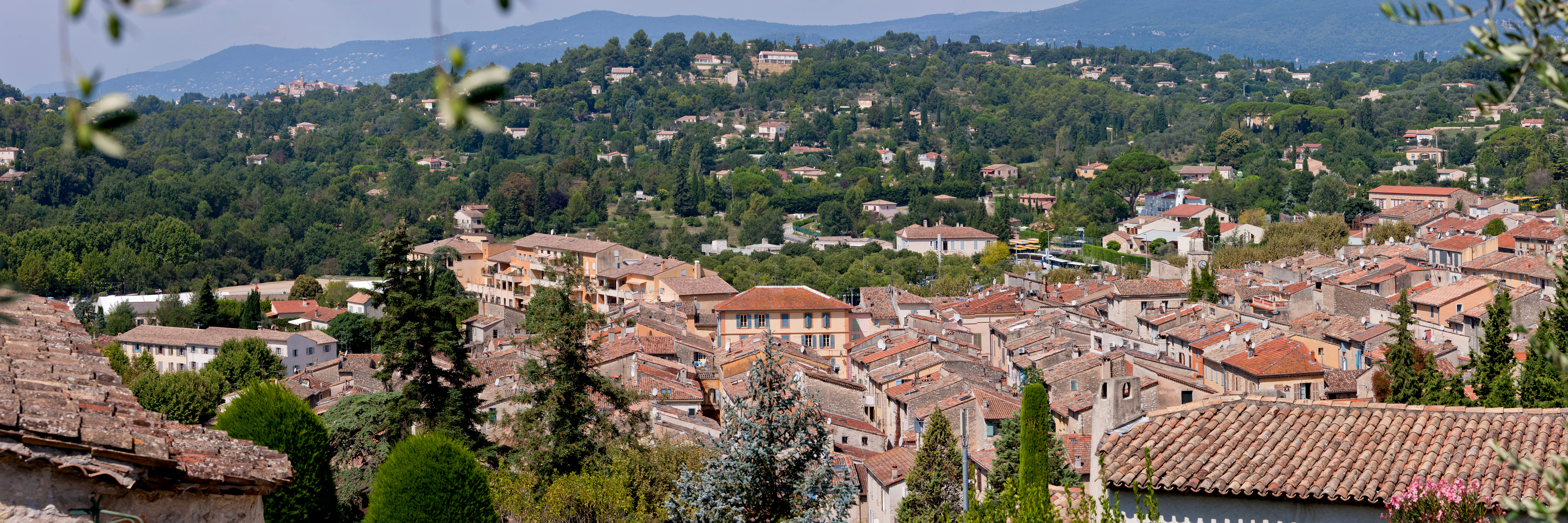
Commune of Valbonne

Valbonne (French pronunciation: [valbɔn]; Occitan: Vauboa) is a commune near Nice in the Alpes-Maritimes department in the Provence-Alpes-Côte d'Azur region in southeastern France. Valbonne means "the good valley" in Provençal and translates to "Vaubona" in Occitan.

The commune is part of the Communauté d'agglomération de Sophia Antipolis. The technology park of Sophia Antipolis is partly located in Valbonne.

== Geography ==
Valbonne is situated in a basin, halfway along the Brague river. The commune consists of two sites:

- the old village situated in the extreme north-west
- Sophia Antipolis in the east, around the towns of Haut-Sartoux and Garbejaïre

== Climate ==
On average, Valbonne experiences 2.5 days per year with a minimum temperature below 0 °C (32.0 °F) and 20.5 days per year with a maximum temperature above 30 °C (86.0 °F). The record high temperature was 37.6 °C (99.7 °F) on 7 August 2003, while the record low temperature was −3.3 °C (26.1 °F) on 11 February 2012.

Climate data for Valbonne (1991–2020 normals, extremes 1987–present)
Month	Jan	Feb	Mar	Apr	May	Jun	Jul	Aug	Sep	Oct	Nov	Dec	Year
Record high °C (°F)	21.1 (70.0)	24.5 (76.1)	26.0 (78.8)	27.6 (81.7)	33.6 (92.5)	37.3 (99.1)	37.4 (99.3)	38.0 (100.4)	34.4 (93.9)	30.1 (86.2)	27.5 (81.5)	23.6 (74.5)	38.0 (100.4)
Mean daily maximum °C (°F)	12.4 (54.3)	12.8 (55.0)	15.2 (59.4)	17.6 (63.7)	21.4 (70.5)	25.5 (77.9)	28.4 (83.1)	28.8 (83.8)	24.8 (76.6)	20.4 (68.7)	15.9 (60.6)	13.1 (55.6)	19.7 (67.4)
Daily mean °C (°F)	9.1 (48.4)	9.3 (48.7)	11.4 (52.5)	13.7 (56.7)	17.5 (63.5)	21.3 (70.3)	24.0 (75.2)	24.4 (75.9)	20.7 (69.3)	16.9 (62.4)	12.6 (54.7)	10.0 (50.0)	15.9 (60.6)
Mean daily minimum °C (°F)	5.9 (42.6)	5.7 (42.3)	7.7 (45.9)	9.8 (49.6)	13.5 (56.3)	17.1 (62.8)	19.6 (67.3)	20.0 (68.0)	16.7 (62.1)	13.4 (56.1)	9.4 (48.9)	6.8 (44.2)	12.1 (53.8)
Record low °C (°F)	−1.6 (29.1)	−3.3 (26.1)	−2.3 (27.9)	1.0 (33.8)	5.0 (41.0)	8.9 (48.0)	12.6 (54.7)	14.0 (57.2)	8.2 (46.8)	3.3 (37.9)	−0.6 (30.9)	−2.2 (28.0)	−3.3 (26.1)
Average precipitation mm (inches)	84.2 (3.31)	59.8 (2.35)	61.7 (2.43)	84.8 (3.34)	58.5 (2.30)	41.0 (1.61)	18.2 (0.72)	28.0 (1.10)	90.6 (3.57)	139.9 (5.51)	149.3 (5.88)	104.3 (4.11)	920.3 (36.23)
Average precipitation days (≥ 1.0 mm)	6.0	5.2	5.5	6.9	5.5	4.0	2.3	2.7	5.3	7.4	8.3	6.1	65.2
Source: Meteociel

== History ==
There are traces of prehistoric human settlement in the area that date back to the Iron Age, the first days of agriculture. Many prehistoric artifacts such as Neolithic stone axes, funeral urns from the Bronze Age, and fragments of amphora, oil and grain jars (dolia) have been excavated. The remains of an aqueduct constructed during Roman settlement in the 3rd century A.D. are also present in the area of Clausonne.

In the High Middle Ages several neighbouring hamlets (Opio, Le Brusc, Sartoux, les Clausonnes and Villebruc) already existed. But the small, isolated valley of Valbonne was deserted. In 1199, the land was offered by the bishop of Antibes to the abbey of Prads (Prads-Haute-Bleone, Alpes-de-Haute-Provence) who founded the abbey of St. Mary. At the time, this area was called Vallis Bona, meaning "the good valley". Later, it became known as Valbonne.

Prads and Valbonne were two of the 15 abbeys and priories of the monastic order of Chalais, an order of "Dauphinois-Provençal" monks. The order was created a century earlier and was similar to the Cistercians. The poverty of these mountain-dwellers caused their disintegration and, in 1297 the abbot of Valbonne came under the authority of the abbey of St. Andrew of Villeneuve-les-Avignon. The bishop of Grasse refused to ratify the arrangement, and in 1303 offered St. Mary to the abbey of Lérins. In 1335 the Pope settled the question – he allocated St. Mary to Lérins.

At the end of the Middle Ages war, drought and the Black Death of 1351 caused the flight of the inhabitants of the surrounding villages, and left the abbey and its environs deserted.

In 1486, under Louis XI, Provence was legally incorporated into the French royal domain, and this began the renaissance of the region. The village now known as Valbonne was founded in 1519, by Augustin de Grimaldi, bishop of Grasse and abbot of Lérins. Augustin de Grimaldi commissioned the worker-monk Don Taxil to construct the village adjacent to the abbey to increase the value of the land. The aim was to use exclusively local labour to build a community that would lead to the repopulation of the region. This was accomplished by the importation of Italian artisans, to work the clay found in the nearby villages of Vallauris and Biot.

The village is laid out along a grid pattern, under the influence of Roman military camps, with two principal avenues, arranged perpendicular to one another, and the forum at the intersection. Arcades were added to the central square in the 17th century and it became known as la Place des Arcades. Originally, the grid consisted of ten streets crossing ten streets but the village has progressively expanded around the center. The architectural plan of the village of Valbonne differs from that of many other villages located in the South of France which typically spiral around a hill. The construction took over a century, and the village remained relatively unchanged until the middle of the 20th century.

In the last century, a surrounding municipality of Valbonne has been constructed around the ancient village. Although the population of the town of Valbonne has greatly increased in recent years, the village itself has remained intact, retaining much of its 16th century charm.

Surrounding Valbonne, the proximity of the coast and especially the construction in the 1970s of the technology park Sophia Antipolis has transformed the region.

== Economy ==
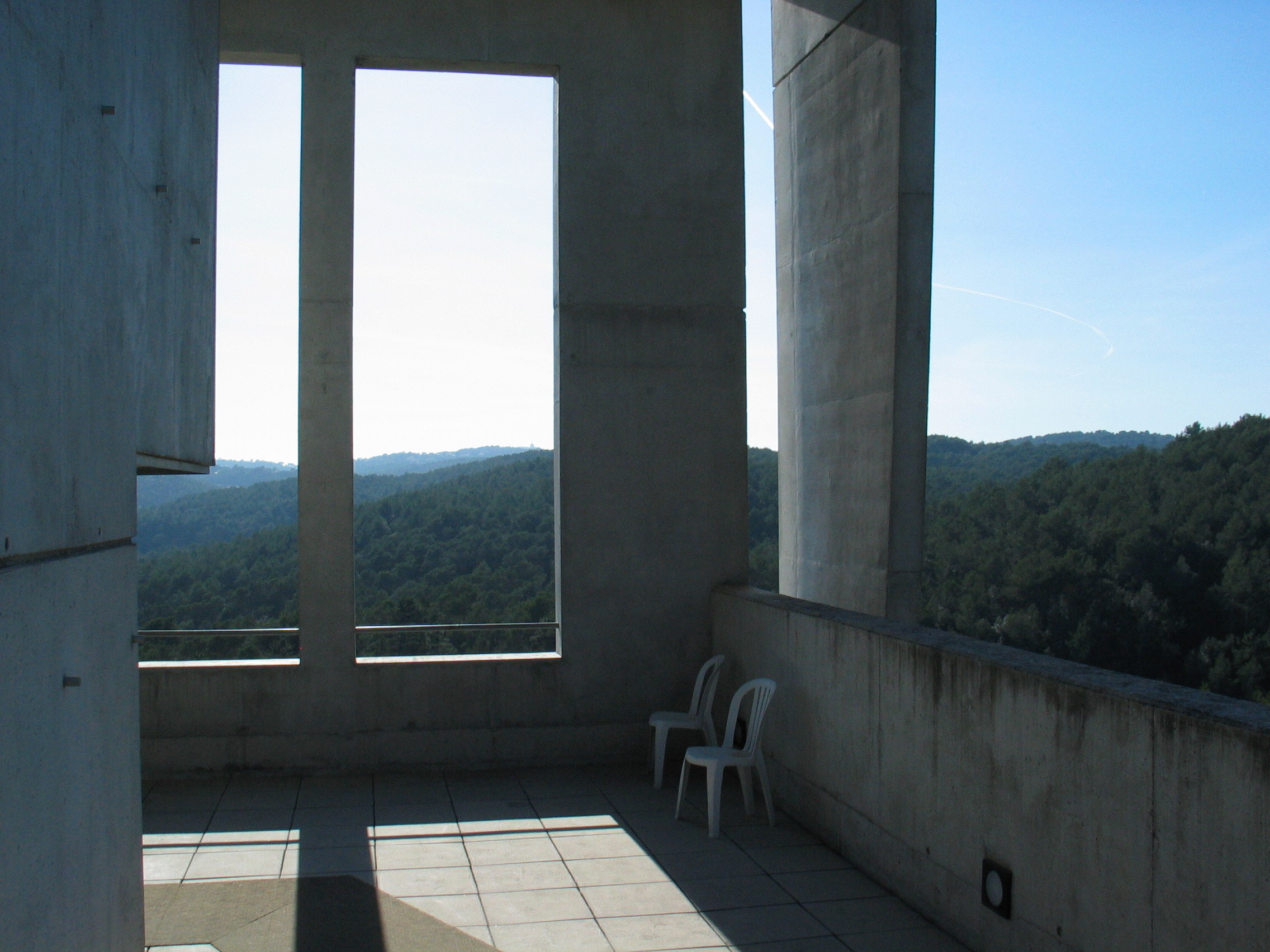
Part of Inria in Valbonne

While the village has been preserved in its original condition, nearby is the high tech centre of Sophia Antipolis, constructed in the 1970s along the same lines as La Défense near Paris. The name was adopted from the ancient Greek colony of Antipolis which resided in the nearby village of Antibes. This plateau was one of the few remaining vast sections of land that had remained untouched in the French Riviera. Initially, investors interested in Sophia Antipolis were mainly oil and mining companies. The park, however, took a different turn when the University of Nice decided to move parts of its campus to the plateau in the 1980s. As a result, Sophia Antipolis became an important site of research and development.

Today, Sophia Antipolis has evolved into a highly recognized international community, with more than 1,000 companies hiring more than 25,000. It now has an area of 2,500 ha spreading over the municipality of Valbonne and its surrounding municipalities, Antibes, Biot, Mougins, and Vallauris. The community continues to grow day by day, with the recent establishments of the municipalities of la Colle-sur-Loup, Roquefort-les-Pins and Villeneuve-Loubet.

== Population ==
The people who live there are known as Valbonnais or Sophipolitains in French.

Historical population
Year	Pop.	±% p.a.
1968	1,878	—
1975	2,264	+2.71%
1982	3,918	+8.15%
1990	9,514	+11.73%
1999	10,746	+1.36%
2007	11,874	+1.26%
2012	12,619	+1.22%
2017	13,325	+1.09%
2023	11,939	−1.81%
Source: INSEE

== Sights ==
=== The old village ===
The architecture of the houses of Valbonne is as rigorous as the street layout (see History above). Originally, they were all identical. The ground floor was for deliveries (these are now found half-underground due to a rise in the level of the street). On the first floor was the living room, above, the bedrooms. Finally, the attic, where stores were hoisted up with the aid of a pulley (some examples of these can still be found).

In the main street is the former town hall, complete with tower and fountain. It was constructed in the 19th century.

=== The abbey-church ===
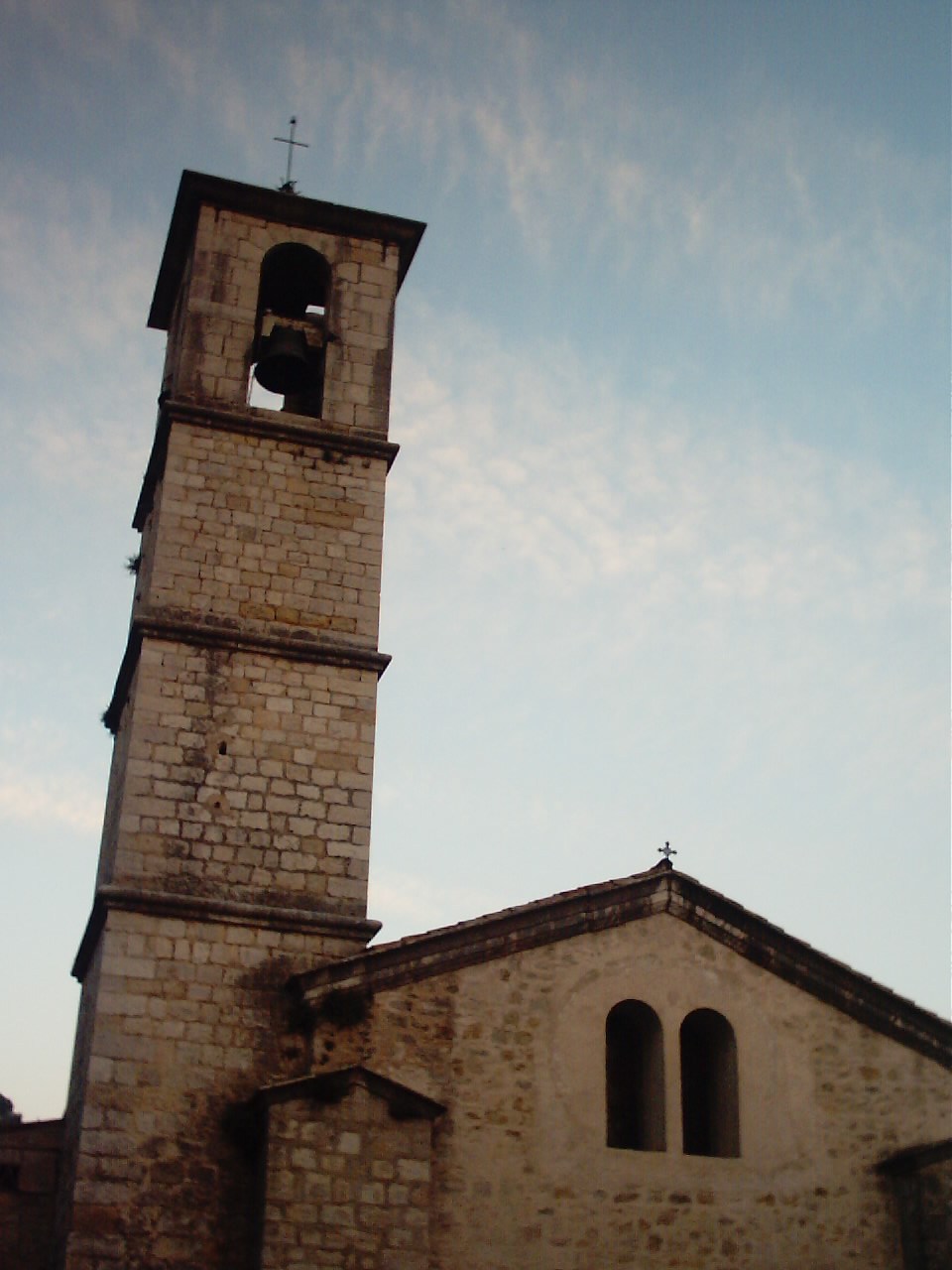
Church of Valbonne

The Romanesque abbey-church was built in the 13th century by Benedictine monks of the Order of Chalais. It became the parish church when the village was built. It is a perfect example of Chalaisien architecture, which is very similar to primitive Cistercian architecture. The clock tower was added in the 19th century. The religious architecture is supplemented by several chapels and oratories, both in the village and surrounding countryside.

The monastic buildings have been well preserved. Their restoration, begun in 1970, is ongoing. They house the Heritage Museum "Le Vieux Valbonne", which houses numerous everyday objects representing the rural life of the village. Exhibitions and presentations bring to life the history of the village and monastic order of Chalais.

== Education ==
Schools in the commune:

- Preschools (Écoles maternelles): Daudet, Garbejaïre, Île Verte, Sartoux
- Elementary schools: Campouns, Garbejaïre, Île Verte, Sartoux
- Junior high schools: Collège Niki de Saint Phalle, Collège de l’Éganaude
- Senior high school/sixth-form college: Lycée Simone Veil
- Centre International de Valbonne

The École Complémentaire Japonaise de la Côte d'Azur (コートダジュール補習授業校 Kōtodajūru Hoshū Jugyō Kō), a part-time Japanese supplementary school, is held in the Groupe Scolaire Garbejaïre Centre Internationale de Valbonne (CIV) in Valbonne.

== Notable people ==
- Joseph Bermond, influential Mayor of Valbonne.
- Pierre Paul Laffitte, scientist, politician and founding father of Sophia Antipolis.

== See also ==
- Communes of the Alpes-Maritimes department
