= Communauté d'agglomération de Sophia Antipolis =

Coordinates: 43.62235°N 7.04721°E

Sophia Antipolis
- Communauté d'agglomération
- Country: France
- Region: Provence-Alpes-Côte d'Azur
- Department: Alpes-Maritimes
- No. of communes: {{{nbcomm}}}
- Established: January 1, 2002

Government
  - President: Jean Leonetti (July 2013)
- Area: 482.8 km^{2} (186.4 sq mi)
- Population (2018): 177,077
  - Density: 366.8/km^{2} (949.9/sq mi)
- Website: www.casa-infos.fr

The Communauté d'agglomération de Sophia Antipolis (CASA) is the communauté d'agglomération, an intercommunal structure, centred on the city of Antibes. It is located in the Alpes-Maritimes department, in the Provence-Alpes-Côte d'Azur region, southeastern France. It was created in 2002, and takes its name from the technology park Sophia Antipolis. Its area is 482.8 km^{2}. Its population was 177,077 in 2018, of which 72,915 in Antibes.

== Composition ==
The communauté d'agglomération consists of the following 24 communes:

- Antibes
- Le Bar-sur-Loup
- Bézaudun-les-Alpes
- Biot
- Bouyon
- Caussols
- Châteauneuf-Grasse
- Cipières
- La Colle-sur-Loup
- Conségudes
- Courmes
- Coursegoules
- Les Ferres
- Gourdon
- Gréolières
- Opio
- La Roque-en-Provence
- Roquefort-les-Pins
- Le Rouret
- Saint-Paul-de-Vence
- Tourrettes-sur-Loup
- Valbonne
- Vallauris
- Villeneuve-Loubet

== Conseil de Communauté ==
The Council of Communities is made up of 50 delegates from the above communes.

== Jurisdiction ==
The CASA has for mandatory areas of jurisdiction:

- Economic development,
- Land management,
- Environmental protection,
- Town political structures.

It is to oversee as well:

- Organization of common transport problems,
- Sanitation collection and treatment,
- Assessment, protection, and economic impact of the local environment,
- The creation, management and assessment of cultural and sporting organizations across the communes.

== Activities of the CASA ==
Areas over which the CASA has shared jurisdiction:

- Aeroports,
- Fisheries and shellfish cultivation,
- Vineyard Cultivation,
- Wine and Spirits production,
- Thermal Energy production,
- Tourism.
