= Karen Joubert Cordier =

French-American artist (born 1954)

- Born: August 29, 1954 (age 71); Neuilly-sur-Seine, France

Karen Joubert Cordier (born August 29, 1954), known as Karen, is a French-American artist.

She currently lives and works on the French Riviera in Roquefort-Les-Pins.

== Early life and education ==
Joubert Cordier was born to an American mother and a French father. Her father was the Chief Purser of the liner France (Compagnie Générale Transatlantique), and she crossed the Atlantic Ocean 49 times. She studied applied arts at the Académie Charpentier, Paris.

== Career ==
After completing her studies, Cordier was mentored by the art dealer Daniel Cordier. Her first exhibition was held at the Galerie Beaubourg, Paris, and her works were later included in the permanent collection at the Georges Pompidou Centre, Paris.

Themes in her work include travel, nature, and plant life. Her time traveling with her father on liners, and further travelling, inspired some of her paintings. She has stated that each journey is a "source of inspiration" and that her creative process sometimes begins with cartoon-like sketches based on her travels. Her series French Prestige depicts scenes and memories inspired by Joubert Cordier's childhood travels, incorporating elements ranging from European settings to figures from the Pop Art movement. Her series Romantic Rivera is inspired by the French Riviera (Côte d'Azur), referencing the era when English and American residents sought tranquility there. Joubert Cordier's paintings in this series depict scenes from the region, using colours like the blue of the sea, the red of the sun, and Sienna tones, and feature figures from various fields including business, film, art, and literature.

She often utilises the entire canvas in her work. Her series Le Déchaînement de Végétal (The Unbridled Vegetation) features depictions of flowers and plants, sometimes utilising fluorescent colours and a free composition style. Her L'Exotism series features canvases depicting plants and animals.

Cordier's Pop Collection incorporates imagery from comic strips, elements of American culture, and consumer society. These works draw upon the pop art tradition and include references to economic trends, figures like Andy Warhol's Marilyn, symbols such as Mickey Mouse and Superman, and personalities ranging from Norman Rockwell to Bill Gates.

Her art incorporates elements often associated with expressionism, fauvism, pointillism, postmodernism, and surrealism. One review states that Joubert Cordier's work incorporates elements reminiscent of the surrealism of Dalí, the colours of Le Douanier Rousseau, the technique of Arcimboldo, and the modernity of Robert Combas.

== Collections ==
Joubert Cordier's works are included in the collection at the Georges Pompidou Centre in Paris. Her works are also in private collections, including those of the former French Prime Minister Jean-Francois Girard and entertainer Elton John, and by institutions such as the Rockefeller Foundation.

Some of her paintings are held in national museums, including the Art Modern Museum in Toulouse, and by international collectors.

== Exhibitions ==
2010

- Shanghai "My City Our Dreams" Gala Auction, Shanghai, China; May 5
- Lifeline Express "The Beauty of Nature" Charity Painting Exhibition, Pacific Place, Hong Kong; Apr 16 – 19
- Christine Gallery, Seoul, South Korea

2009

- Alife Fresco 7th Anniversary, Tokyo; August 28
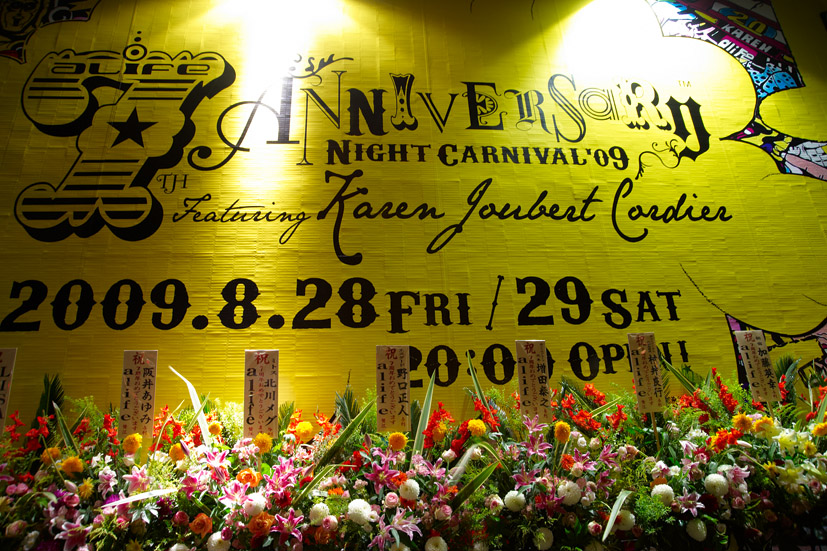
Under the lime-light

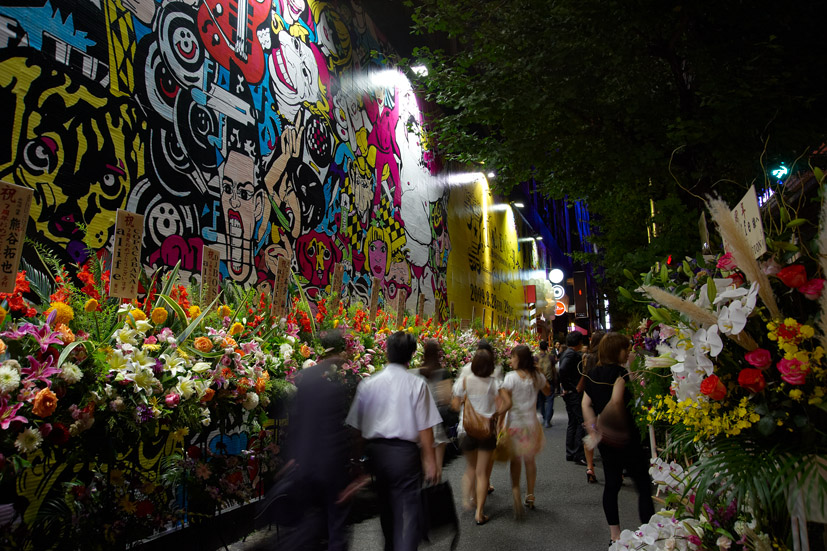
Street-view

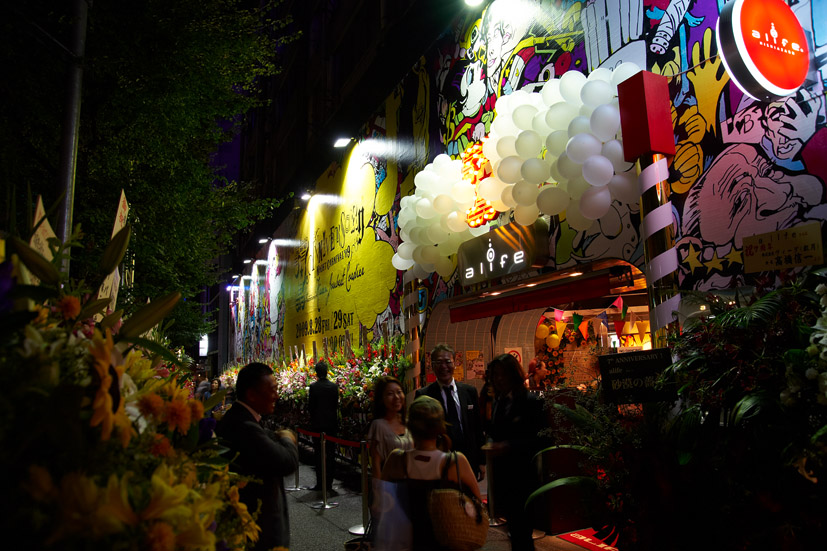
A life in the night-time

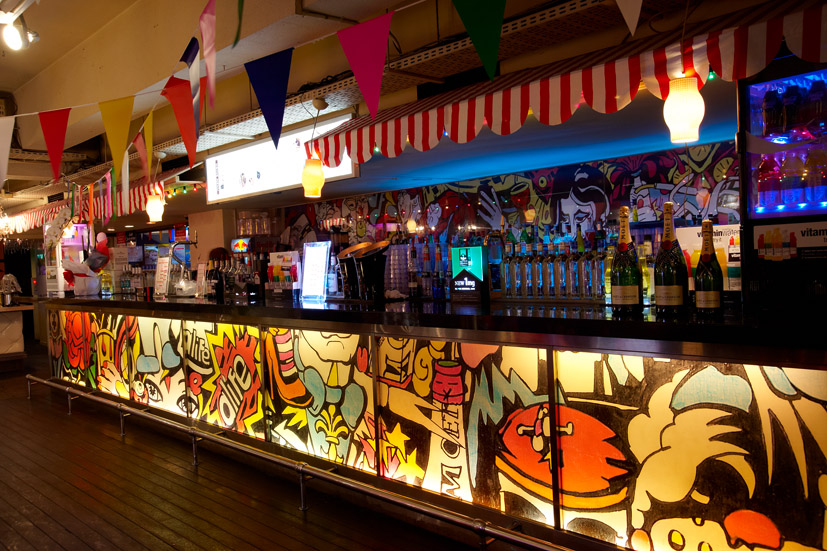
Interior decoration
- Festival de Cannes; May 20
- Le French May, Hong Kong Arts Centre, Hong Kong; May 1 – 7
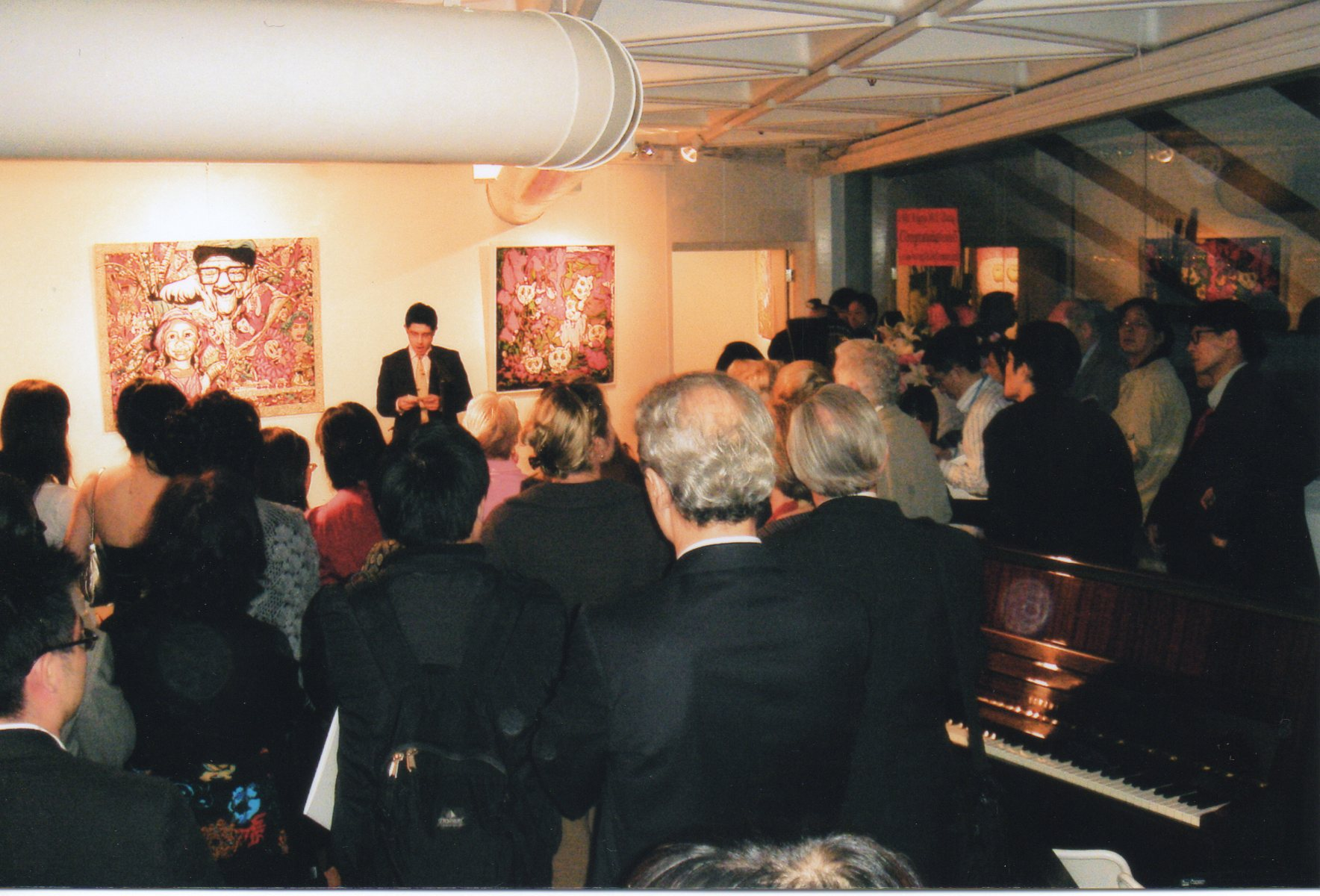
Speech for Joubert Cordier

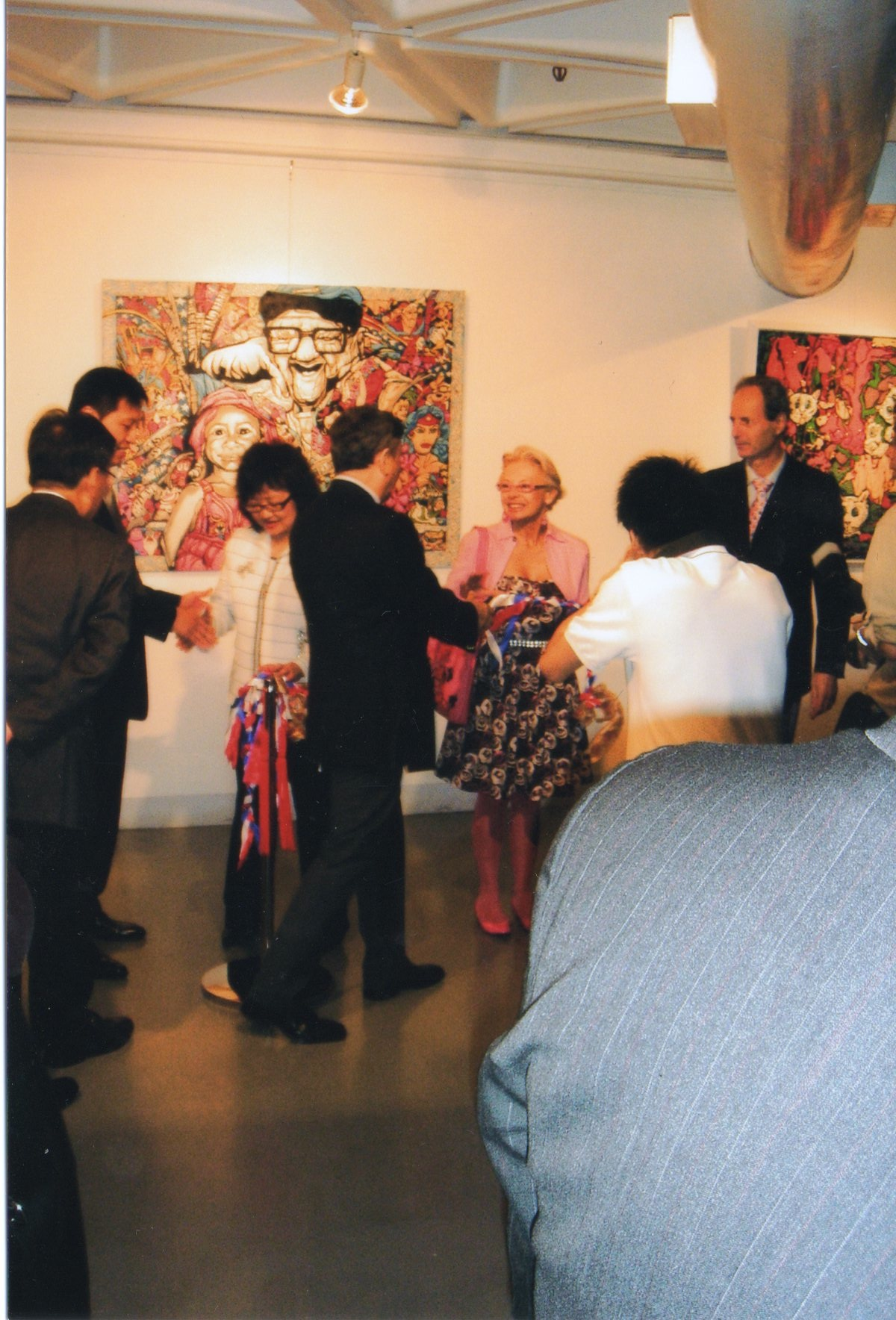
Joubert Cordier

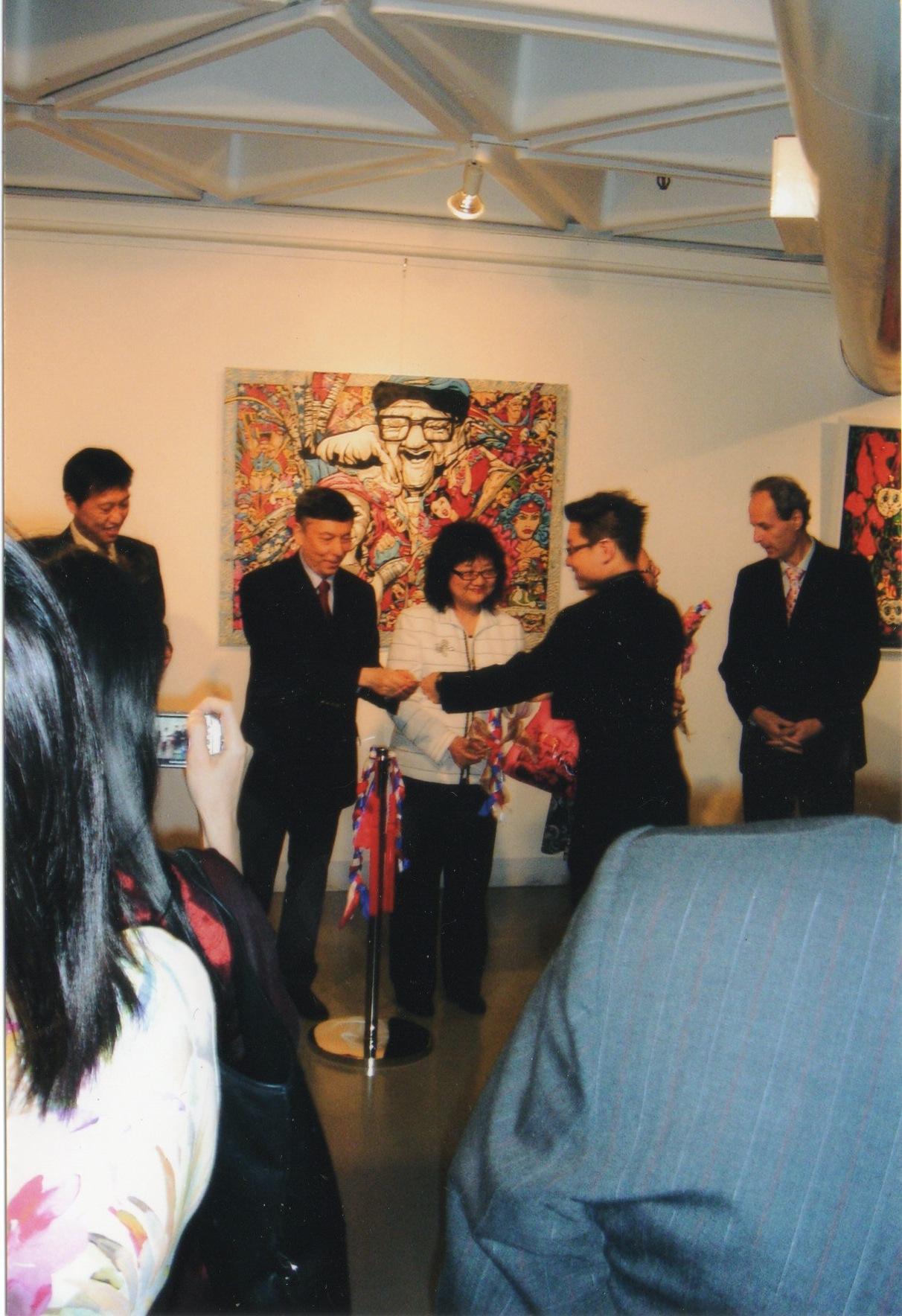
Opening of French May featuring KJC
- Galarie Marie Ricoo, Calvi; April 11 – 30
- Les désordres du plaisir, Musée des abattoirs, Art Moden Museum, Toulouse (new donation Daniel Cordier); Jan 24 – April 19

2008

- Hong Kong International Arts and Antiques Fair, Hong Kong
- Fresco on wall: CERAM Business School, Sophia Antipolis
- Museum of Perfume, Grasse
- Gallery Take 121, Nashville, USA
- Happy Art Gallery and Rotshield Bank, Cannes; Oct 8
- Galerie Geraldine Zberro, Paris
- Galerie Onega, Paris
- Chicago Sister Cities International, Chicago, USA; Oct 8

2007

- Galerie Pelissier, Nice
- Grand Hotel St. Jean cap, Ferrat
- Galerie de l'eveche, Vence

2006

- Raffles Museum, Singapore
- Ode to Art Gallery, Singapore
- Negresco Hotel, Nice
- Kieba Gallery, Vence
- Karement Karen College Nikide, St Phalle

2005

- Dream and Passion, Singapore
- French Affair with Singapore, Singapore
- Villa Durazzo, Santa Margarita, Italy
- Les Abattoirs, Art Modern Museum, Toulouse
- Beaubourg Gallery, Vence
- Negresco Hotel, Nice
- Château Ste Roseline, Draguignan
- Cultural Center, Roquefort les pins

2004

- Business Center, Nice Airport
- Galerie Loumani, Valbonne

2003

- La Verand'anne, Gstaad, Switzerland
- Referencing at Georges Pompidou Library
- Fifth Gallery, Paris
- Galerie de l'eveche, Vence
- SNCP Champs Elysees, Paris

2002

- Cultural Center, Roquefort les pins
- L'Abbaye, La Colle sur Loup
- Mas d'Artigny, Vence

2001

- Gallery Aurora (William), Shanghai, China
- Navy Museum, Le Havre
- Mas d'Artigny, Vence
- Negresco Hotel, Nice
- Tatina Tournemine Gallery, Paris
- Beaubourg Gallery, Vence

2000

- Chateau des fleurs, Marianne and Pierre Nahon, Vence
- L'Ile en terre Gallery, Vence

1991 - 1999

- 99: L'Abbaye, La Colle sur Loup
- 98: Chateau Str Roseline, Draguignan
- 98: Consulat du Canada, Chicago, USA
- 96: New Eastside Art Works, Chicago, USA
- 96: Nicole Gallery, Chicago, USA
- 94: Majestic Hotel, Cannes

1980 - 1990

- 89: Art Honction Nahon, Nice
- 88: Centre Georges Pompidou, Paris
- 87: Galerie Beaubourg, Paris
- 86: Henry Clew Foundation, Mandelieu

Permanent exhibitions

- Les Abattoirs, Art Modern Museum, Toulouse
- Georges Pompidou Centre, Paris
- Galerie Onega, Paris
- Navy Museum, Le Havre
- Galerie Marie Ricco, Calvi
- Happy Art Galerie, Cannes
- Ode de Art Gallery, Singapore
