= Jacques Durandi =

Italian painter

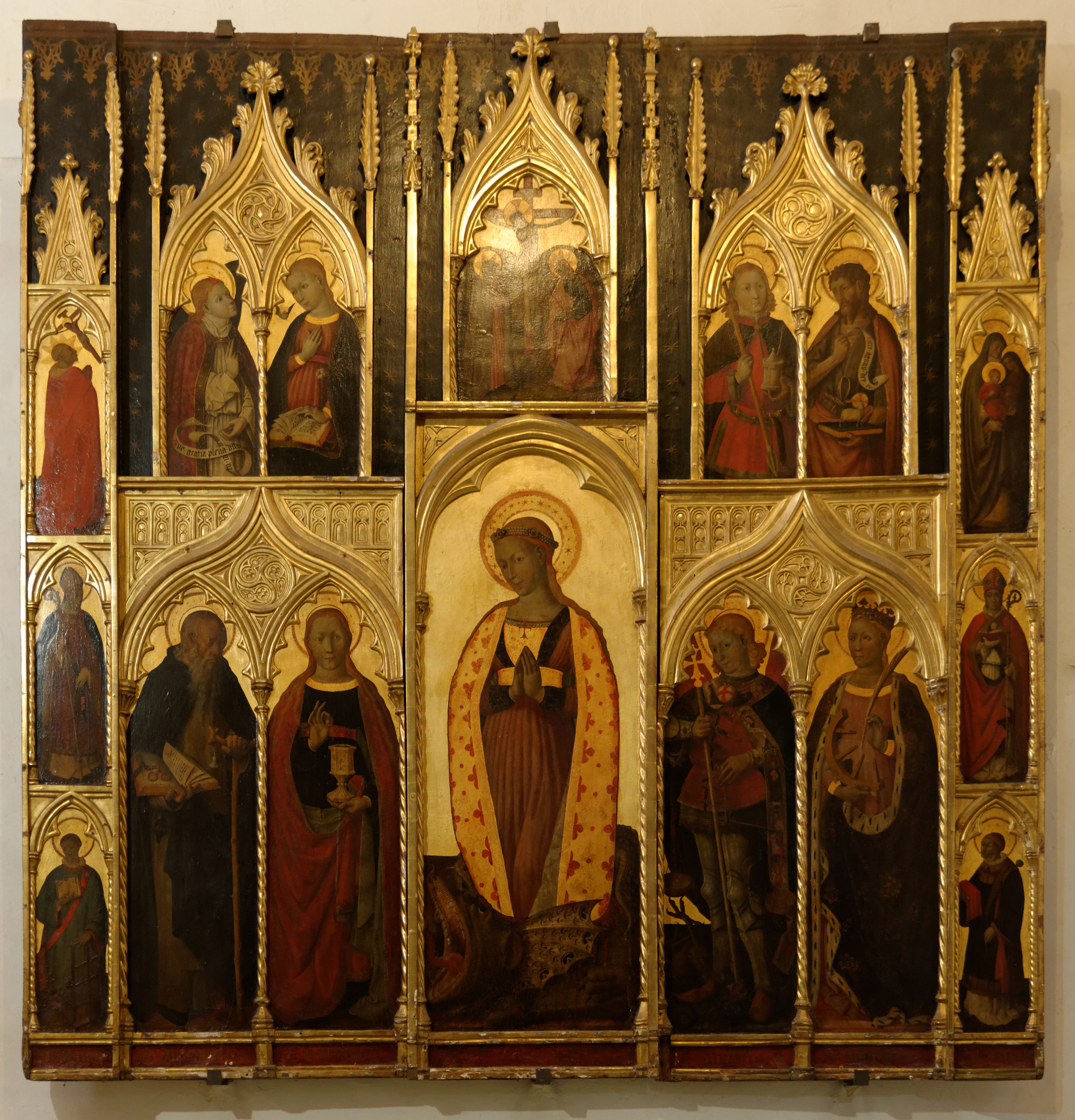
Saint Margaret retable in Fréjus Cathedral

Jacopo Durandi (c. 1410 – 1469) was an Italian painter active in France. Together with his brother Cristoforo, he worked in Nice. Very little is known of his life, but a few of his works have survived. The main one is the Saint Margaret retable in the Fréjus Cathedral. Another retable, originally from Lucéram, is now kept in the Musée des Beaux-Arts de Nice.

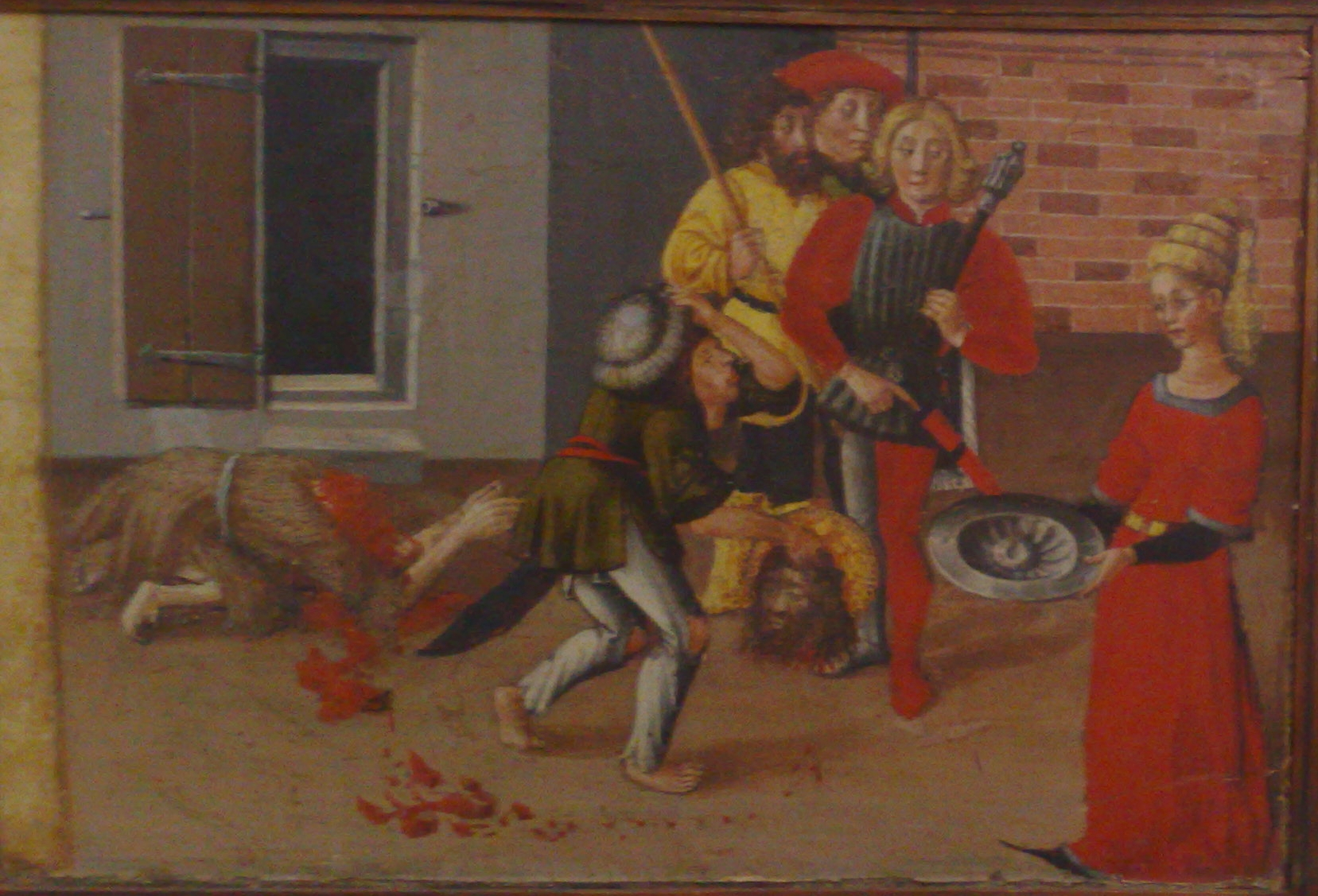
Detail of the Lucéram retable

He presumably learned to paint in Siena or from a Sienese master. He worked circa 1440 in Bouyon, in 1443 in Taggia in northern Italy, and around 1450 in Fréjus and possibly Marseille. Between 1454 and 1469 he is recorded as working in Nice, painting works for churches, but also portraits and decorations. The early works of Ludovico Brea are similar to the work of Durandi, which may indicate that Brea was his pupil.
