= Le Rouret =

Commune in Provence-Alpes-Côte d'Azur, France

- Commune
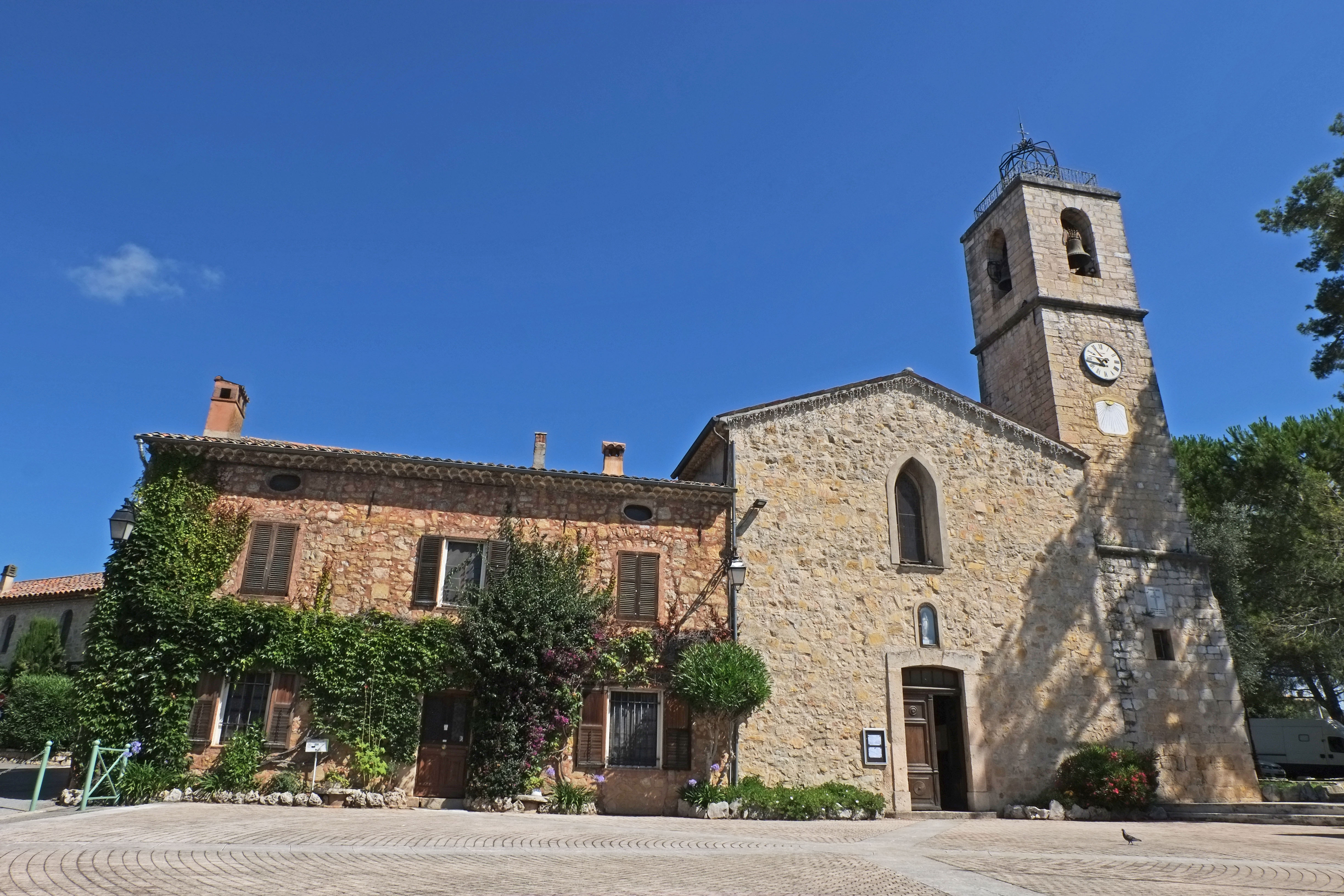
- The church of Saint-Pons in Le Rouret

- Coat of arms
- Location of Le Rouret
- Location within France Location within Provence-Alpes-Côte d'Azur
- Coordinates: 43°40′31″N 7°00′23″E
- Country: France
- Region: Provence-Alpes-Côte d'Azur
- Department: Alpes-Maritimes
- Arrondissement: Grasse
- Canton: Valbonne
- Intercommunality: CA Sophia Antipolis

Government
  - Mayor (2026–32): Gérald Lombardo
- Area^{1}: 7.1 km^{2} (2.7 sq mi)
- Elevation: 3,456 m (11,339 ft)
- Highest elevation: 480 m (1,570 ft)
- Lowest elevation: 178 m (584 ft)
- Population (2023): 4,209
  - Density: 590/km^{2} (1,500/sq mi)
- Time zone: UTC+01:00 (CET)
  - Summer (DST): UTC+02:00 (CEST)
- INSEE/Postal code: 06112 /06650
- ^{1} French Land Register data, which excludes lakes, ponds, glaciers > 1 km^{2} (0.386 sq mi or 247 acres) and river estuaries.

Le Rouret (French pronunciation: [lə ʁuʁɛ]; Occitan: Lo Roret) is a commune in the Alpes-Maritimes department in southeastern France.

== Geography ==
Le Rouret is located 10 km (6.2 mi) from Grasse, 26 km (16 mi) from Cannes and the Mediterranean coast, 28 km (17 mi) from Nice and 45 km (28 mi) from Monaco. Parts of Le Rouret sit on a south-facing elevation, providing a view to the Mediterranean Sea ranging from Monaco to Saint-Tropez.

== Economy ==
The commune is largely residential, but a number of shops and a local tourist information office can be found in the centre of the village. The surrounding areas are interspersed with flower farms, used by the perfume distilleries of Grasse.

Le Rouret is an example of a typical Provençal village undergoing modern development: evidence of its agricultural present and past remains clear despite increased tourism, cultural activities and housing developments.

== History ==
=== Protohistory ===
Two sites in Le Rouret show signs of ancient occupation: Le Camp du Bois du Rouret and Le Castellaras.

Le Camp du Bois is situated on a hilltop. Digs carried out by Paul Goby at the end of the 19th century showed signs of habitations from around 400 BC, with the most dense period of occupation being around 100 BC.

Le Castellaras is very similar but additionally sports a fallen monolith, thought to date from the Neolithic era or Bronze Age. However, no other signs of occupations from these periods has been found on this site.

=== Modern Era ===
- Early 1900s: 604 inhabitants who work on the land
- 1910: tram line to Le Rouret established
- Mai 1928: tram line stopped, fewer travellers arrive
- 1945: 545 inhabitants after World War II
- Start of the French Fifth Republic: a road joining Grasse and Nice is built through Le Rouret and population increases.

== Population ==
Historical population
| Year | Pop. | ±% p.a. |
|---|---|---|
| 1968 | 1,208 | — |
| 1975 | 1,664 | +4.68% |
| 1982 | 2,315 | +4.83% |
| 1990 | 2,927 | +2.98% |
| 1999 | 3,428 | +1.77% |
| 2007 | 3,778 | +1.22% |
| 2012 | 3,965 | +0.97% |
| 2017 | 3,999 | +0.17% |
| 2023 | 4,209 | +0.86% |
Source: INSEE

== Personalities ==
- Richard Wright, best known for his career as a Pink Floyd's keyboardist, lived in a villa in the village.
- The family of Richard Galliano, a French-Italian accordionist, have lived in Le Rouret for generations.
- Actor Roger Moore (007) spent his summers here in his villa.
- British comedian Ricky Gervais bought a villa at the top of Le Rouret in December 2013.
- U2 lead singer Bono owns a residence in the commune.
- Madonna is thought to own a villa in the neighboring commune, Roquefort-les-Pins.
- Peter Churchill, famous SOE agent in the Second World War, lived here after the war until his death in 1972.

== See also ==
- Communes of the Alpes-Maritimes department
