= Canton of Villeneuve-Loubet =

Coordinates: 43.64°N 7.13°E

- Canton
- Situation of the canton of Villeneuve-Loubet in the department of Alpes-Maritimes
- Country: France
- Region: Provence-Alpes-Côte d'Azur
- Department: Alpes-Maritimes
- No. of communes: {{{nbcomm}}}
- Population (2023): 36,245
- INSEE code: 0627

The canton of Villeneuve-Loubet is an administrative division of the Alpes-Maritimes department, southeastern France. It was created at the French canton reorganisation which came into effect in March 2015. Its seat is in Villeneuve-Loubet.

It consists of the following communes:

1. La Colle-sur-Loup
2. Roquefort-les-Pins
3. Saint-Paul-de-Vence
4. Villeneuve-Loubet
