= Biot, Alpes-Maritimes =

Commune in Provence-Alpes-Côte d'Azur, France

Biot
- Commune
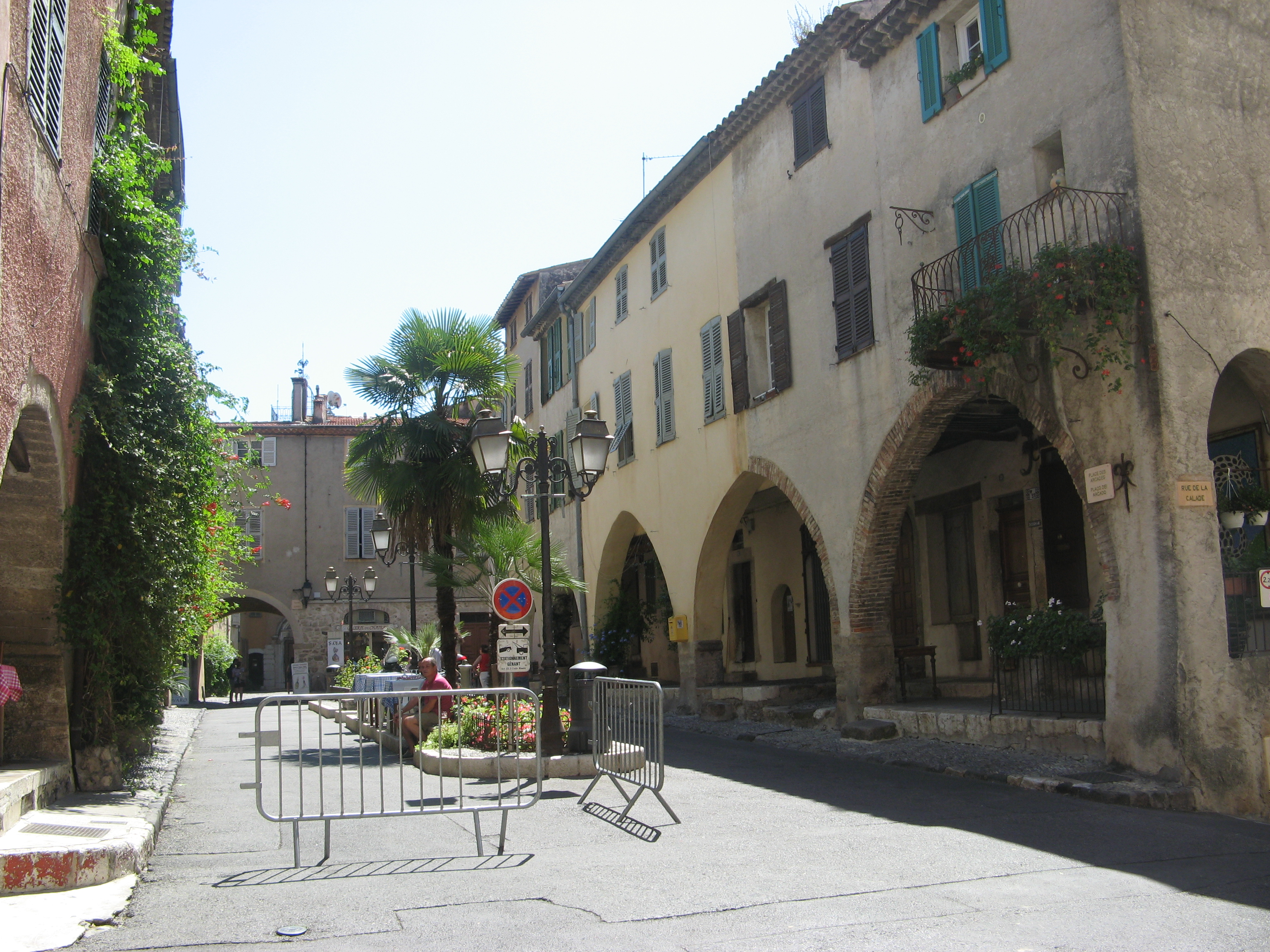
- The Place des Arcades Biot, in Biot

- Coat of arms
- Location of Biot
- Location within France Location within Provence-Alpes-Côte d'Azur
- Coordinates: 43°37′46″N 7°05′46″E
- Country: France
- Region: Provence-Alpes-Côte d'Azur
- Department: Alpes-Maritimes
- Arrondissement: Grasse
- Canton: Antibes-3
- Intercommunality: CA Sophia Antipolis

Government
  - Mayor (2026–32): Jean-Pierre Dermit
- Area^{1}: 15.54 km^{2} (6.00 sq mi)
- Highest elevation: 208 m (682 ft)
- Lowest elevation: 9 m (30 ft)
- Population (2023): 10,511
  - Density: 676.4/km^{2} (1,752/sq mi)
- Time zone: UTC+01:00 (CET)
  - Summer (DST): UTC+02:00 (CEST)
- INSEE/Postal code: 06018 /06410
- ^{1} French Land Register data, which excludes lakes, ponds, glaciers > 1 km^{2} (0.386 sq mi or 247 acres) and river estuaries.

Biot (French pronunciation: [bjɔt]; Occitan: Biòt) is a small fortified medieval hilltop village in the Provence-Alpes-Côte d’Azur near Antibes, between Nice and Cannes. Many people come to Biot for its renowned cubist art museum of Fernand Leger as well as the winding cobbled lanes on the elevated fort. This village, which is known for its ceramics and glassblowing, dates to prehistoric times.

== History ==
For a long period prior to 154 BC, Celto-Ligurians (the Oxybians and Deceates tribes) controlled the region. There was discord between the tribes and the town of Antipolis (Antibes), who then asked the Romans for help. Romans settled in Biot in 154 BC which they then occupied for five centuries, leaving behind monuments that are still here today.

The Count of Provence, who had authority over the region of Biot, donated the area to the Knights Templar (Solomon's Temple Catholic military) in 1209. At the time Biot was only made up of (today's tourist destination), The Place aux Arcades, the church, and a few homes. After purchasing and being donated land such as the Biot Chateau (a building still visible between Les Place aux Arcades and the Church Square), The Knights Templar consolidated the region of Biot. Biot remained a harmonious region up until the Revolution, which took place when Joanna I Queen of Naples took the throne, as well as the Black Plague. Biot was taken over by pirates and thieves in the 14th century. Both the Black Plague and the crooks were responsible for the destruction of the village. Biot became a refuge for the thieves.

Biot was able to recover and return to its prosperous times in 1470 thanks to the King René of Naples who came to settle in Biot with advantageous conditions. In the 16th century, Villagers quickly enriched themselves with farming and pottery. Although there were a few invasions that caused damages to the town's crops, Biot bounced back on its feet and became a renowned center for ceramics.

A few months before his death in 1955, the innovative cubist artist Fernand Leger moved from Paris to Biot. Leger bought a villa, The Mas Saint André, located at the foot of the village by a garden. Leger came to Biot to pursue the production of his ceramics. His widow, Nadia Léger, and his close collaborator, Georges Bauquier, opened a museum in 1960 as an homage to Leger, sharing knowledge of his work. The Fernand Leger Museum continues to attract visitors to Biot.

== Population ==
Historical population
Year	Pop.	±% p.a.
1968	2,656	—
1975	2,745	+0.47%
1982	3,680	+4.28%
1990	5,575	+5.33%
1999	7,395	+3.19%
2007	8,995	+2.48%
2012	10,054	+2.25%
2017	9,733	−0.65%
2023	10,511	+1.29%
Source: INSEE

== Location ==
Biot is located between Cannes and Nice on the border of the town of Antibes. Biot and the nearby communities of Antibes, Mougins, Valbonne, and Vallauris constitute the Sophia Antipolis technology park, which houses 2,500 companies and universities.

== See also ==
- Communes of the Alpes-Maritimes department
