= Alpes-Maritimes's 7th constituency =

Constituency of the National Assembly of France

7th constituency of Alpes Maritimes
- inline Constituency of the National Assembly of France

- Constituency in department

- Alpes Maritimes in France
- Deputy: Éric Pauget; LR
- Department: Alpes Maritimes
- Cantons: Antibes-Biot, Antibes-Centre, Bar-sur-Loup, Vallauris-Antibes Ouest

The 7th constituency of Alpes-Maritimes is a French legislative constituency currently represented by Éric Pauget of The Republicans (LR). It contains the town and surrounding areas of Antibes.

== Historic Representation ==
Election	Member	Party
1988	Pierre Merli	UDF
1993	Pierre Merli	UDF
1997	Jean Leonetti	UDF
2002	Jean Leonetti	UMP
2007	Jean Leonetti	UMP
2011	Michel Rossi (Note: Substitute for Jean Leonetti)	UMP
2012	Jean Leonetti	UMP
2017	Éric Pauget	LR
2022	Éric Pauget	LR
2024	Éric Pauget	LR

== Election results ==
=== 2024 ===
Candidate	Party	Alliance	First round		Second round	
Candidate	Party	Alliance	Votes	%	Votes	%
Eric Pauget	LR	UDC	16,389	24.88	37,955	58.73
Thierry Ferrand	RN		23,921	36.22	26,672	41.27
Aline Abravanel	REN	Ensemble	11,510	17.47		
Arthur Meyer-Abbatucci	LFI	NFP	10,974	16.66		
Marylin Zbirou	EAC		1,651	2.51		
David Quintela	REC		932	1.41		
Christian Petard	LO		264	0.40		
Enzo Dewasmes	DIV		225	0.34		
Valid votes			65,866	98.47	64,627	97.28
Blank votes			761	1.14	1,534	2.31
Null votes			261	0.39	276	0.42
Turnout			66,888	69.47	66,437	69.00
Abstentions			29,396	30.53	29,851	31.00
Registered voters			96,284		96,288	
Result			LR HOLD			

=== 2022 ===
Legislative Election 2022: Alpes-Maritimes's 7th constituency
Party	Candidate	Votes	%	±%
LR (UDC)	Eric Pauget	12,031	26.46	-5.74
LREM (Ensemble)	Eric Mele	10,814	23.78	-8.30
RN	Tanguy Cornec	7,675	16.88	+1.73
LFI (NUPÉS)	Arthur Meyer-Abbatucci	7,086	15.58	+2.37
REC	Audrey Marius	3,472	7.64	N/A
DVE	Marie-José Vallade	1,146	2.52	+0.76
GRS (FGR)	Arnaud Delcasse	950	2.09	N/A
Others	N/A	2,294	5.03	
Turnout		45,468	47.23	−1.30
2nd round result
LR (UDC)	Eric Pauget	22,496	58.84	-0.61
LREM (Ensemble)	Eric Mele	15,738	41.16	+0.61
Turnout		38,234	42.26	−2.67
LR hold				

=== 2017 ===
Candidate	Label	First round		Second round	
Candidate	Label	Votes	%	Votes	%
Éric Pauget	LR	14,279	32.20	23,278	59.45
Khaled Ben Abderrahmane	REM	14,225	32.08	15,875	40.55
Lionel Tivoli	FN	6,718	15.15		
Philippe Carenzo	FI	3,182	7.18		
Élisabeth Deborde	ECO	1,535	3.46		
Cécile Dumas	PCF	1,138	2.57		
Sophie Mori	DLF	964	2.17		
Marie-José Vallade	ECO	780	1.76		
Stéphane Nedonsel	DVD	529	1.19		
Maurice Gillard	ECO	335	0.76		
Virginie Pacorel	DIV	294	0.66		
Thierry Bitouzé	DVG	227	0.51		
Christian Pétard	EXG	136	0.31		
Votes		44,342	100.00	39,153	100.00
Valid votes		44,342	98.34	39,153	93.84
Blank votes		635	1.41	2,088	5.00
Null votes		112	0.25	482	1.16
Turnout		45,089	48.53	41,723	44.93
Abstentions		47,816	51.47	51,131	55.07
Registered voters		92,905		92,854	
Source: Ministry of the Interior

=== 2012 ===
Legislative Election 2012: Alpes Maritimes 7th
Party	Candidate	Votes	%	±%
UMP	Jean Leonetti	25,912	51.10	
DVG	Eric Martin	10,769	21.24	
FN	Mathilde Viot	8,567	16.89	
FG	Cécile Dumas	2,344	4.62	
DVE	Maurice Gillard	1,105	2.18	
Far left	Philippe Carenzo	803	1.58	
Far right	Jean-Claude Frappa	588	1.16	
DVD	Jean Bruno Tondini	443	0.87	
Far left	Christian Petard	177	0.35	
Turnout		51,314	57.20	
UMP hold		Swing		

=== 2007 ===
Legislative Election 2007: Alpes Maritimes 7th
Party	Candidate	Votes	%	±%
UMP	Jean Leonetti	37,281	63.99	
PS	Noria Chaib	5,619	9.64	
MoDem	Edwige Madec-Vercnocke	4,390	7.53	
PCF	Gérard Piel	3,628	6.23	
FN	Isidore Focachon	3,282	5.63	
LV	Philippe Mussi	1,718	2.95	
MEI	Carine Curtet	702	1.10	
Independent	Nicole Kretchmann	473	0.81	
Independent	Maurice Cotte	285	0.43	
MNR	Muguette Llorens	390	0.67	
LO	Christian Pétard	383	0.66	
Turnout		59,043	59.87	
UMP hold		Swing		

=== 2002 ===
Legislative Election 2002: Alpes-Maritimes's 7the constituency
Party	Candidate	Votes	%	±%
UMP	Jean Leonetti	29,709	53.10	
FN	Jean-Claude Frappa	10,796	19.30	
LV	Philippe Mussi	9,315	16.65	
PCF	Gérard Piel	3,078	5.50	
Others	N/A	3,053		
Turnout		56,751	63.34	
UMP gain from UDF				

=== 1997 ===
Legislative Election 1997: Alpes-Maritimes's 7th constituency
Party	Candidate	Votes	%	±%
UDF	Jean Leonetti	20,252	38.90	
FN	Robert Crépin	12,134	23.31	
PS	Jean-Michel Guichard	8,486	16.30	
PCF	Gérard Piel	3,359	6.45	
RPR	Gérard Bourrat*	3,086	5.93	
LV	Pascal Marquès	2,104	4.04	
Others	N/A	2,639		
Turnout		53,774	64.17	
2nd round result
UDF	Jean Leonetti	35,379	72.96	
FN	Robert Crépin	13,110	27.04	
Turnout		54,371	64.88	
UDF hold				

*RPR dissident

== Sources ==
Results at the Ministry of the Interior (French)
