= La Colle-sur-Loup =

Commune in Provence-Alpes-Côte d'Azur, France

- Commune
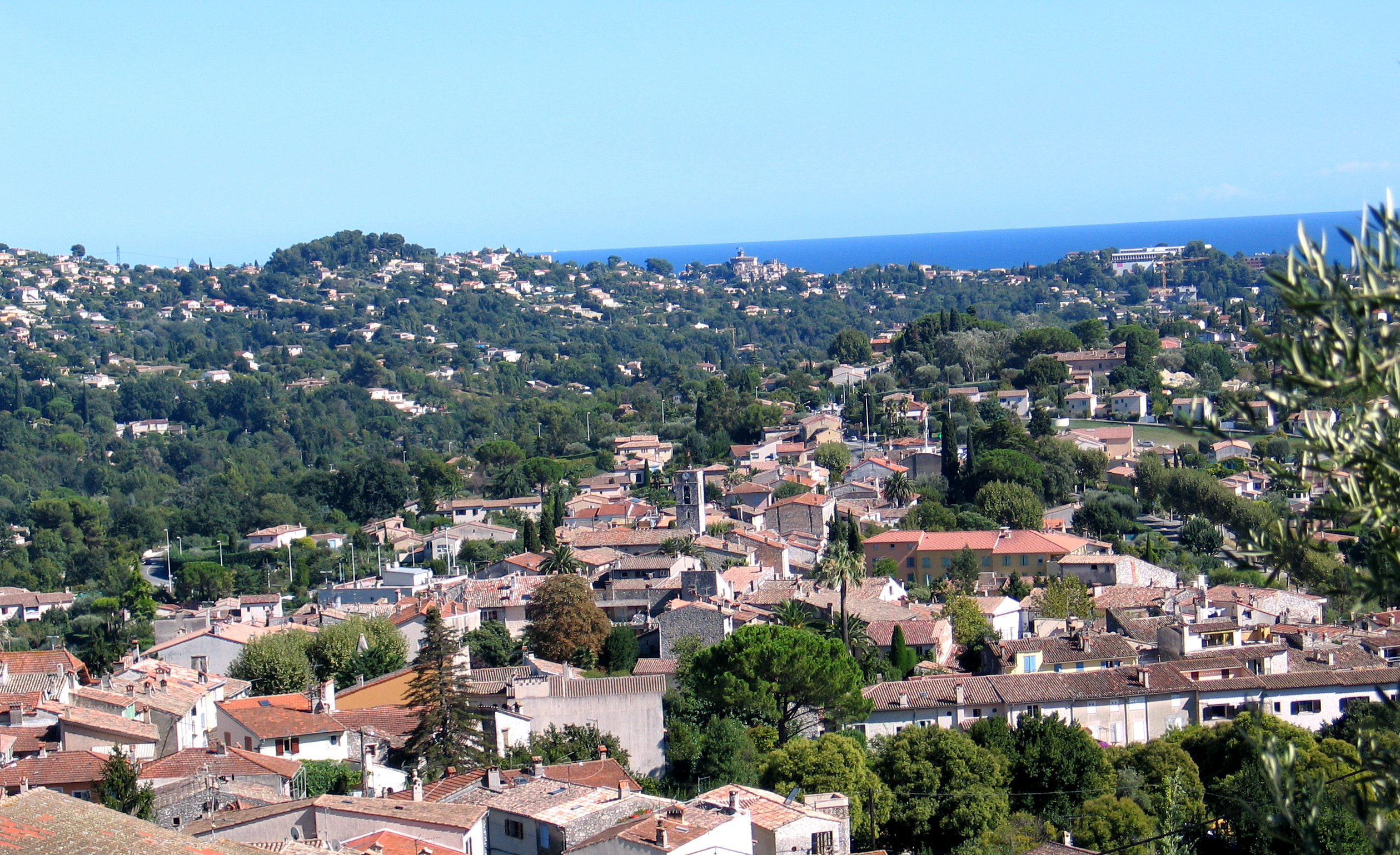
- A view over the village of La Colle-sur-Loup

- Coat of arms
- Location of La Colle-sur-Loup
- Location within France Location within Provence-Alpes-Côte d'Azur
- Coordinates: 43°41′14″N 7°06′16″E
- Country: France
- Region: Provence-Alpes-Côte d'Azur
- Department: Alpes-Maritimes
- Arrondissement: Grasse
- Canton: Villeneuve-Loubet
- Intercommunality: CA Sophia Antipolis

Government
  - Mayor (2026–32): Jean-Bernard Mion
- Area^{1}: 9.82 km^{2} (3.79 sq mi)
- Highest elevation: 351 m (1,152 ft)
- Lowest elevation: 10 m (33 ft)
- Population (2023): 8,202
  - Density: 835/km^{2} (2,160/sq mi)
- Time zone: UTC+01:00 (CET)
  - Summer (DST): UTC+02:00 (CEST)
- INSEE/Postal code: 06044 /06480
- ^{1} French Land Register data, which excludes lakes, ponds, glaciers > 1 km^{2} (0.386 sq mi or 247 acres) and river estuaries.

La Colle-sur-Loup (French pronunciation: [la kɔl syʁ lu]; Occitan: Sa Còla de Lop) is a commune in the Alpes-Maritimes department in southeastern France.

== Population ==
Historical population
Year	Pop.	±% p.a.
1968	2,611	—
1975	3,700	+5.11%
1982	4,749	+3.63%
1990	6,025	+3.02%
1999	6,697	+1.18%
2007	7,546	+1.50%
2012	7,726	+0.47%
2017	7,838	+0.29%
2023	8,202	+0.76%
Source: INSEE

== Notable residents ==
- Jean-François-Maxime Raybaud (1795–1894), a philhellene officer, writer, and a participant in the War of Independence of Greece.
- Bernard Collomb (1930–2011), race car driver, lived in the town after his retirement from racing
- Daniel Pennac (born 1944), writer, spent part of his childhood in the town
- Jean-Pierre Teisseire (born 1940), politician and professional football player, was born in La Colle-sur-Loup

== See also ==
- Communes of the Alpes-Maritimes department
