= Canton of Antibes-Biot =

Coordinates: 43°34′51″N 7°07′26″E

Antibes-Biot
- Former canton
- Interactive map of Antibes-Biot
- Country: France
- Region: Provence-Alpes-Côte d'Azur
- Department: Alpes-Maritimes
- No. of communes: {{{nbcomm}}}
- Established: 1985
- Disbanded: 2015
- Population (2012): 38,899

The canton of Antibes-Biot is a former administrative division in Alpes-Maritimes, southeastern France. It was created on 31 January 1985. Its seat was in Antibes. It was disbanded following the French canton reorganisation which came into effect in March 2015. It had 38,899 inhabitants (2012). It included the following communes:

- Antibes (partly)
- Biot.

== Demographics ==
Historical population
Year	Pop.	±%
1999	35,410	—
2012	38,899	+9.9%

== See also ==
- Cantons of the Alpes-Maritimes department
