= Roger Capron =

French ceramist

- Born: 8 September 1922; Vincennes, France
- Died: 5 November 2006 (aged 84); Cannes
- Education: École des Arts Appliqués à l'Industrie
- Known for: Drawing, Ceramics

Roger Capron was born in Vincennes, France, on September 4, 1922. Interested in drawing, he studied Applied Arts in Paris from 1939 to 1943 and worked as an art teacher in 1945. He died on November 8, 2006, leaving behind a considerable body of work that is recognized worldwide.

In 1946, Roger Capron moved to Vallauris, where he founded a ceramics workshop known as 'l`Atelier Callis', contributing to the renaissance of ceramics in Vallauris.

In 1952, Roger Capron purchased an abandoned pottery in Vallauris and opened a small ceramics factory, with 15 workers. By 1957 he had established a considerable international reputation. In 1980 his factory employed 120 people and during that same decade he reverted to making one-off pieces which were shown internationally. Following an economic crisis, the factory was closed in 1982.

== Timeline ==
- 1922 Born September 4 in Vincennes
- 1939-1943 Studied at the École des Arts Appliqués à l'Industrie (School of Applied Arts) in Paris
- 1945 Professor of Drawing at the École des Arts Appliqués à l'Industrie (School of Applied Arts) in Paris
- 1946-1948 Foundation of 'l`Atelier Callis' in Vallauris in collaboration with Robert Picault and Jean Derval.
- 1952 Creation of a small factory in an old pottery factory
- 1968 New collaboration with Jean Derval
- 1970 Collaboration with Marazzi-Sassuolo
- 1983 Creation of the Atelier Capron
- 2006 Died November 8.

== Prizes ==
- 1954 Gold Medal at the Milan Triennale
- 1955 Silver Medal at Cannes
- 1957 and 1958 Gold Medal at Brussels Exhibition of architectural ceramics
- 1968 Prix du Ministère des Affaires Culturelles
- 1970 Grand Prix International de la Céramique
- 1980 Prix Spécial de l'Architecture

== Bibliography ==
- Roger Capron, Céramiste, Staudenmeyer Éditions Norma, ISBN 978-2-909283-53-1.
- L'Âge d'or de Vallauris, A. Lajoix, Les Editions de l'Amateur, ISBN 2-85917-336-6.
