= Saint-Paul-de-Vence =

Commune in Provence-Alpes-Côte d'Azur, France

Saint-Paul-de-Vence Sant Pau (Occitan)
- Commune
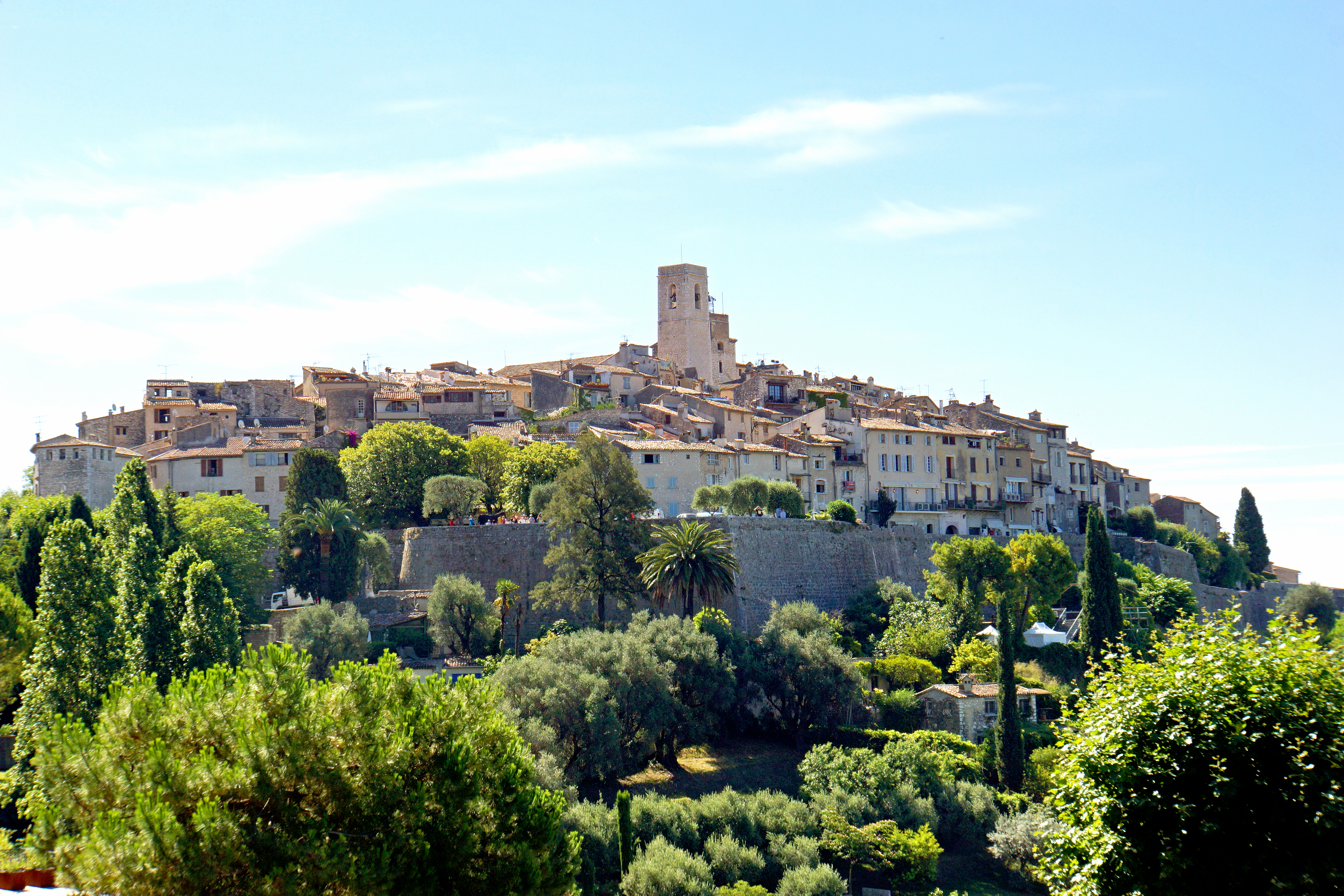
- Panorama of Saint-Paul-de-Vence from the path of St. Clare in August 2012

- Coat of arms
- Location of Saint-Paul-de-Vence
- Location within France Location within Provence-Alpes-Côte d'Azur
- Coordinates: 43.698°N 7.122°E
- Country: France
- Region: Provence-Alpes-Côte d'Azur
- Department: Alpes-Maritimes
- Arrondissement: Grasse
- Canton: Villeneuve-Loubet
- Intercommunality: CA Sophia Antipolis

Government
  - Mayor (2026–32): Jean-Pierre Camilla
- Area^{1}: 7.26 km^{2} (2.80 sq mi)
- Elevation: 180 m (590 ft)
- Highest elevation: 355 m (1,165 ft)
- Lowest elevation: 39 m (128 ft)
- Population (2023): 3,203
  - Density: 441/km^{2} (1,140/sq mi)
- Time zone: UTC+01:00 (CET)
  - Summer (DST): UTC+02:00 (CEST)
- INSEE/Postal code: 06128 /06570
- ^{1} French Land Register data, which excludes lakes, ponds, glaciers > 1 km^{2} (0.386 sq mi or 247 acres) and river estuaries.

Saint-Paul-de-Vence (French pronunciation: [sɛ̃ pɔl də vɑ̃s], literally Saint-Paul of Vence; Occitan: Sant Pau de Vença; Italian: San Paolo di Venza) is a commune in the Alpes-Maritimes department in the Provence-Alpes-Côte d'Azur region of Southeastern France. One of the oldest medieval towns on the French Riviera, Saint-Paul-de-Vence is well known for its modern and contemporary art museums and galleries such as the Fondation Maeght, and for the 17th-century Saint Charles-Saint Claude chapel, which in 2012–2013 was decorated with murals by French artist Paul Conte.

Until 2011, the commune was officially called Saint-Paul.

== Population ==
Historical population
Year	Pop.	±% p.a.
1968	1,570	—
1975	1,917	+2.89%
1982	2,542	+4.11%
1990	2,903	+1.67%
1999	2,847	−0.22%
2007	3,374	+2.15%
2012	3,548	+1.01%
2017	3,477	−0.40%
2023	3,203	−1.36%
Source: INSEE

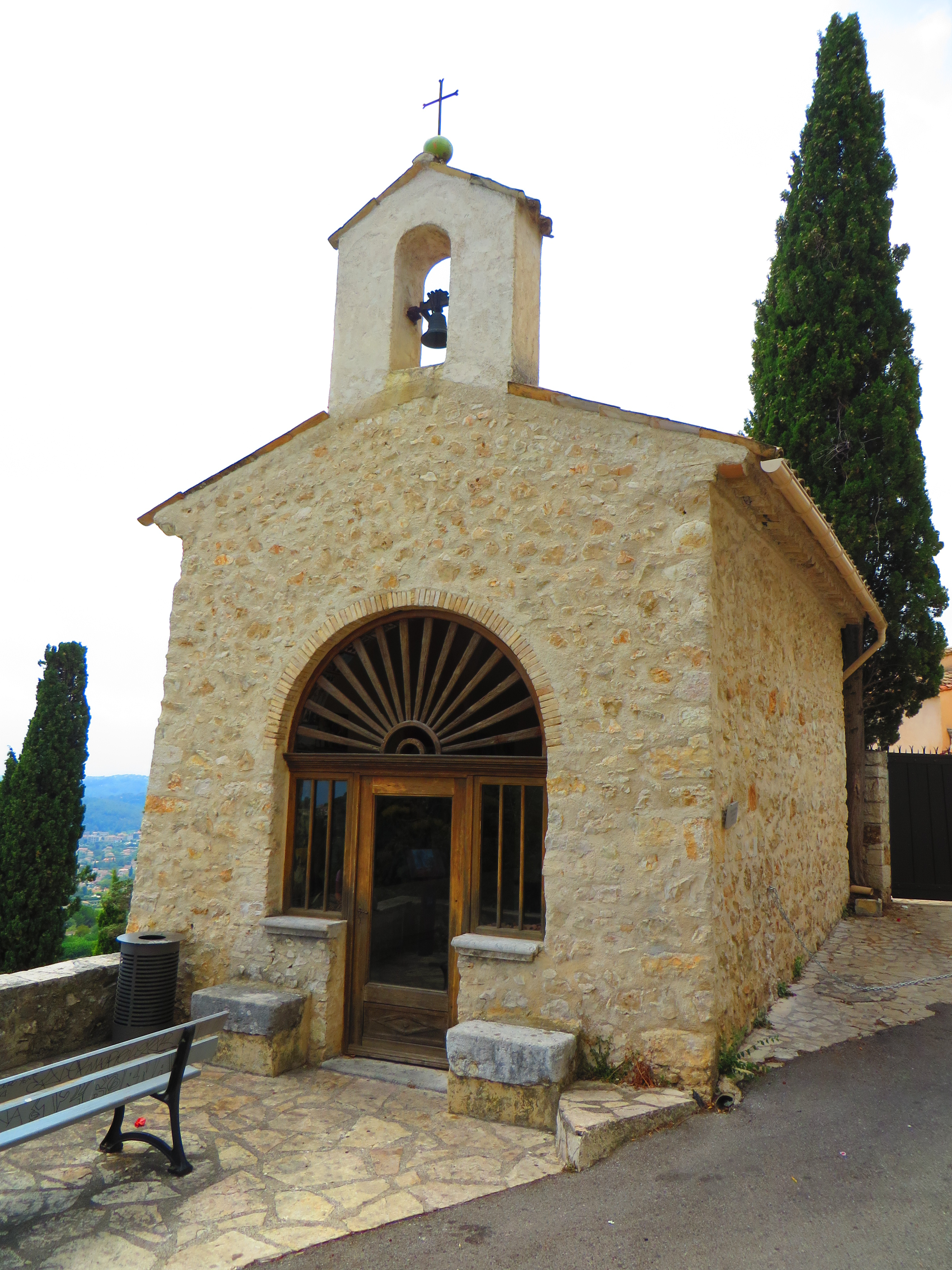
Saint Charles-Saint Claude chapel, built in the 17th century.

== Notable people ==
Saint-Paul-de-Vence has long been a haven of the famous, mostly due to the La Colombe d'Or hotel, whose former guests include Jean-Paul Sartre and Pablo Picasso. During the 1960s, the village was frequented by French actors Yves Montand, Simone Signoret and Lino Ventura, and poet Jacques Prévert.

Saint-Paul is also well known for the artists who have lived there, such as Jacques Raverat, Gwen Raverat and Marc Chagall and more recently the couple Bernard-Henri Lévy and Arielle Dombasle. Former Rolling Stones bassist Bill Wyman has a home there. American writer James Baldwin lived in Saint-Paul-de-Vence for 17 years until his death in 1987. British actor Donald Pleasence lived there until his death in 1995.

Former football player Vincenzo Rennella was born in Saint-Paul-de-Vence. Actress and artist Rebecca Dayan was raised in a hotel there.

American comedians Gene Wilder and Gilda Radner were married in Saint-Paul-de-Vence by its mayor on 18 September 1984.

== See also ==
- Communes of the Alpes-Maritimes department
- James Baldwin in France
