= Jean Leonetti =

French politician

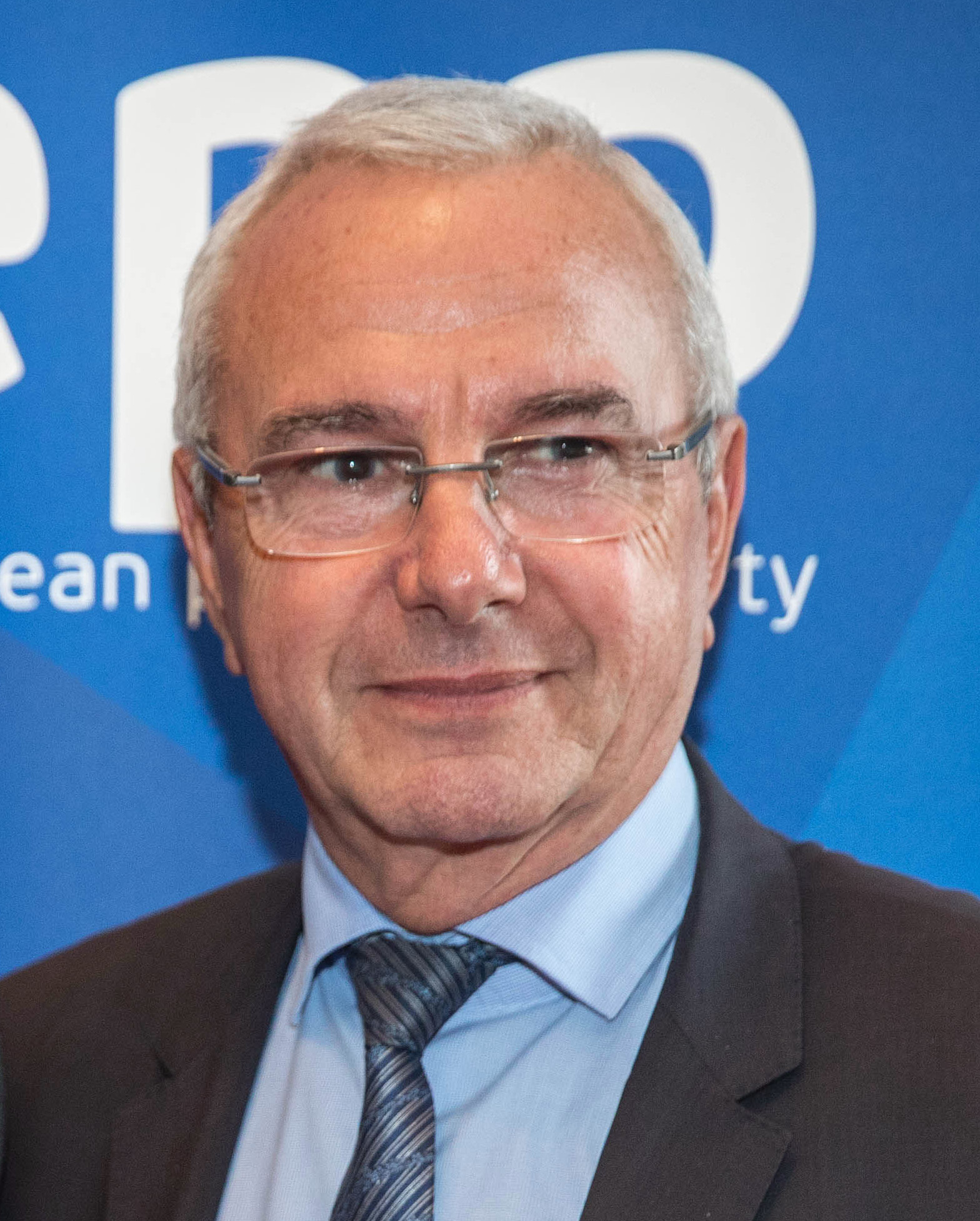
- Jean Leonetti in 2019

Mayor of Antibes
- Incumbent
- Assumed office 25 June 1995
- Preceded by: Pierre Merli

President of The Republicans (interim)
- In office 2 June 2019 – 13 October 2019
- Preceded by: Laurent Wauquiez
- Succeeded by: Christian Jacob

Secretary of State for European Affairs
- In office 29 June 2011 – 10 May 2012
- President: Nicolas Sarkozy
- Prime Minister: François Fillon
- Preceded by: Laurent Wauquiez
- Succeeded by: Bernard Cazeneuve

Member of the National Assembly for Alpes-Maritimes's 7th constituency
- In office 20 June 2012 – 20 June 2017
- Preceded by: Michel Rossi
- Succeeded by: Éric Pauget

Personal details
- Born: 9 July 1948 (age 78) Marseille, France
- Party: The Republicans (2015–present)
- Other political affiliations: Union for a Popular Movement (2002–2015)
- Education: Aix-Marseille University

Jean Leonetti (born 9 July 1948) is a French cardiologist and politician who served as a member of National Assembly from 1997 to 2011 and again from 2012 to 2017, representing Alpes-Maritimes's 7th constituency. He a former president of the Republicans and is also a member of the Radical Party.

== Political career ==
Following Jean-François Copé’s resignation as chair of the UMP, Leonetti supported Bruno Le Maire’s candidacy to succeed Copé. He later endorsed Alain Juppé in the Republicans’ primaries ahead of the 2017 presidential election.

In 2015, Leonetti authored legislation allowed patients with hours or days to live to stop treatment and request to be placed under general anaesthetic until the moment they die.

== Political positions ==
In his capacity as Minister of European Affairs, Leonetti said in 2011 the Eurozone could survive even if Greece were forced out of the currency union.
