= Bouyon =

Commune in Provence-Alpes-Côte d'Azur, France

- Commune
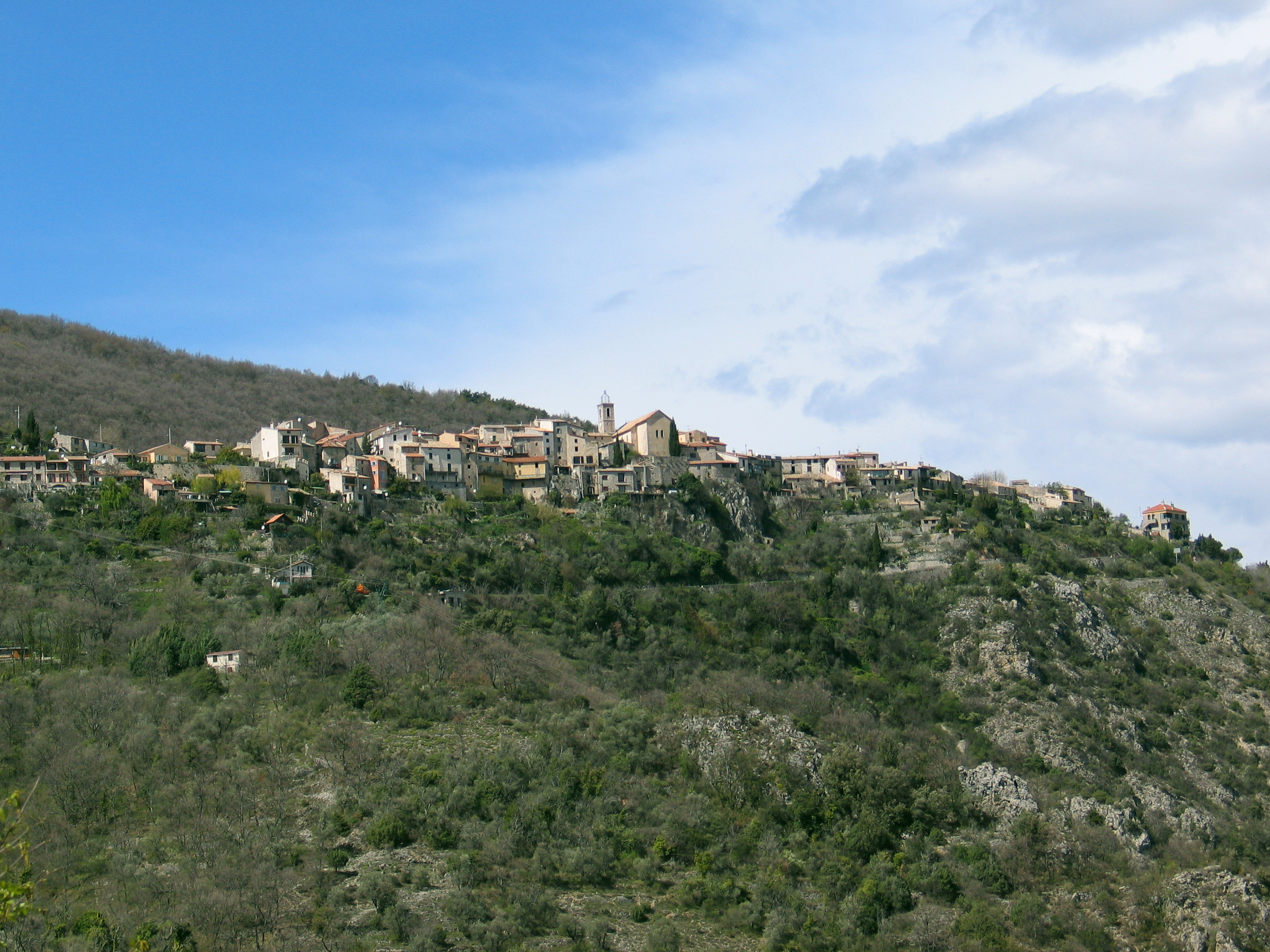
- A general view of the village

- Coat of arms
- Location of Bouyon
- Location within France Location within Provence-Alpes-Côte d'Azur
- Coordinates: 43°49′31″N 7°07′26″E
- Country: France
- Region: Provence-Alpes-Côte d'Azur
- Department: Alpes-Maritimes
- Arrondissement: Grasse
- Canton: Vence
- Intercommunality: CA Sophia Antipolis

Government
  - Mayor (2026–32): Jean-Pierre Mascarelli
- Area^{1}: 12.29 km^{2} (4.75 sq mi)
- Elevation: 637 m (2,090 ft)
- Highest elevation: 1,260 m (4,130 ft)
- Lowest elevation: 159 m (522 ft)
- Population (2023): 557
  - Density: 45.3/km^{2} (117/sq mi)
- Demonym: Bouyonnais
- Time zone: UTC+01:00 (CET)
  - Summer (DST): UTC+02:00 (CEST)
- INSEE/Postal code: 06022 /06510
- ^{1} French Land Register data, which excludes lakes, ponds, glaciers > 1 km^{2} (0.386 sq mi or 247 acres) and river estuaries.

Bouyon (French pronunciation: [bujɔ̃]; Occitan: Boion; Italian: Boione) is a commune in the Alpes-Maritimes department in southeastern France.

Situated 30 km (19 mi) northwest of Nice, Bouyon offers magnificent panoramic views of the Alps, and features a traditional château and communal bread oven. Local leisure activities include hiking, mountain-biking, tennis, and fishing, and there is an annual Fête in June and August.

== Population ==
Historical population
Year	Pop.	±% p.a.
1968	157	—
1975	202	+3.67%
1982	229	+1.81%
1990	243	+0.74%
1999	352	+4.20%
2007	448	+3.06%
2012	484	+1.56%
2017	538	+2.14%
2023	557	+0.58%
Source: INSEE

== See also ==
- Communes of the Alpes-Maritimes department
