= Canton of Antibes-3 =

Coordinates: 43.60°N 7.12°E

- Canton
- Situation of the canton of Antibes-3 in the department of Alpes-Maritimes
- Country: France
- Region: Provence-Alpes-Côte d'Azur
- Department: Alpes-Maritimes
- No. of communes: {{{nbcomm}}}
- Population (2023): 38,992
- INSEE code: 0603

The canton of Antibes-3 is an administrative division of the Alpes-Maritimes department, southeastern France. It was created at the French canton reorganisation which came into effect in March 2015. Its seat is in Antibes.

It consists of the following communes:

1. Antibes (partly)
2. Biot
