= Vallauris =

Commune in Provence-Alpes-Côte d'Azur, France

Vallauris Valàuria (Occitan)
- Commune
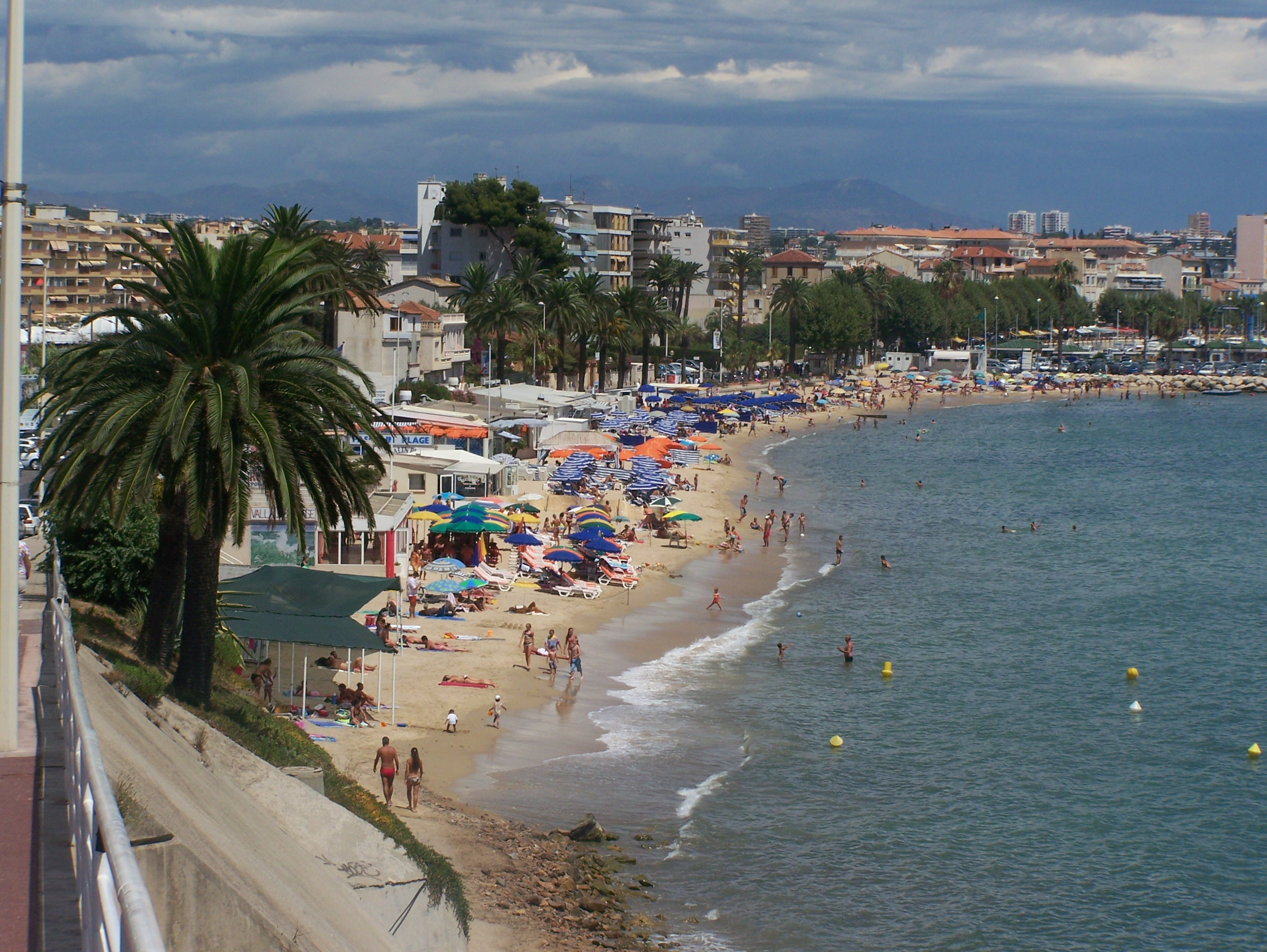
- Golfe-Juan

- Coat of arms
- Location of Vallauris
- Location within France Location within Provence-Alpes-Côte d'Azur
- Coordinates: 43°34′50″N 7°03′14″E
- Country: France
- Region: Provence-Alpes-Côte d'Azur
- Department: Alpes-Maritimes
- Arrondissement: Grasse
- Canton: Antibes-1
- Intercommunality: CA Sophia Antipolis

Government
  - Mayor (2026–32): Kévin Luciano
- Area^{1}: 13.04 km^{2} (5.03 sq mi)
- Elevation: 112 m (367 ft)
- Highest elevation: 285 m (935 ft)
- Lowest elevation: 0 m (0 ft)
- Population (2023): 29,259
  - Density: 2,244/km^{2} (5,811/sq mi)
- Time zone: UTC+01:00 (CET)
  - Summer (DST): UTC+02:00 (CEST)
- INSEE/Postal code: 06155 /06221
- ^{1} French Land Register data, which excludes lakes, ponds, glaciers > 1 km^{2} (0.386 sq mi or 247 acres) and river estuaries.

Vallauris (French pronunciation: [valoʁis]; Occitan: Valàuria; Niçard subdialect: Valàuri) is a seaside commune in the Alpes-Maritimes department in the Provence-Alpes-Côte d'Azur region in Southeastern France. It is located in the metropolitan area (and is today effectively an extension of the city) of Antibes, bordering it on its west side. The seaside town Golfe-Juan is a part of the commune of Vallauris. Golfe-Juan-Vallauris station has rail connections to Grasse, Cannes, Antibes and Nice.

== Picasso and Vallauris ==
In 1948 Picasso came to live in Vallauris, where he stayed until 1955. During his time in the town, he created a great many sculptures and paintings including his mural War and Peace, one of the major artworks of the period. He also developed a fascination for the techniques of ceramics and linocuts.

A freeman of the town, Picasso greatly contributed to the renaissance of the Vallauris pottery industry in the 1950s, this legendary golden age when everyone was a potter, including famous ceramicists Roger Capron and Charles Voltz. Many inhabitants still evoke his presence and that of his contemporaries (Françoise Gilot and her children Claude and Paloma, then Jacqueline Roque, his last partner whom he married amid the greatest secrecy at Vallauris town hall in 1961), the bullfights, exhibitions and visits by all kinds of famous people.

== Demographics ==
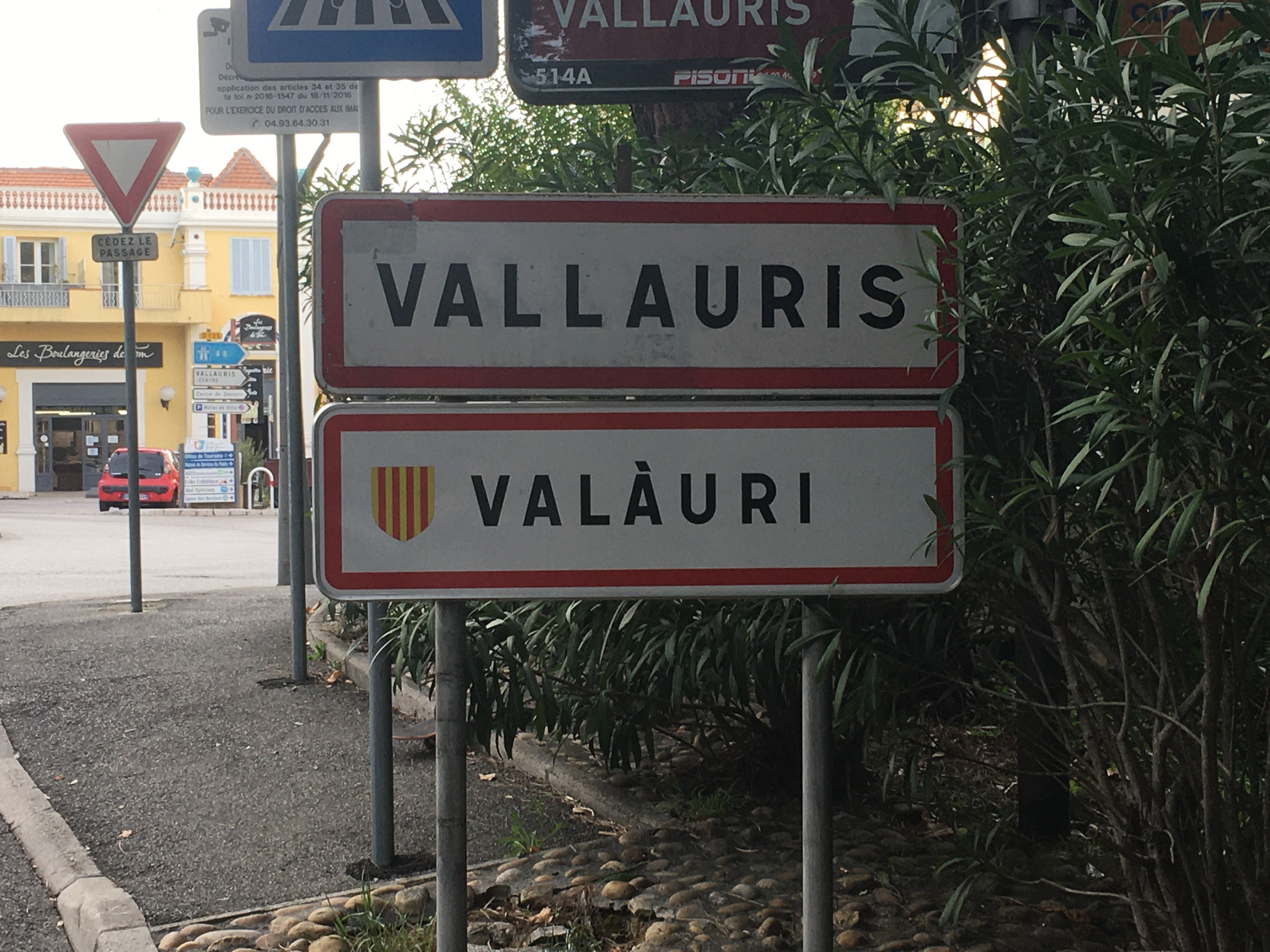
A road sign of Vallauris in both French and Niçard (a subdialect of Provençal)

Historical population

Year	Pop.	±% p.a.
1793	1,479	—
1800	1,446	−0.32%
1806	1,527	+0.91%
1821	1,746	+0.90%
1831	2,060	+1.67%
1836	2,065	+0.05%
1841	2,031	−0.33%
1846	2,482	+4.09%
1851	2,577	+0.75%
1856	2,584	+0.05%
1861	2,810	+1.69%
1866	3,016	+1.42%
1872	3,273	+1.37%
1876	3,666	+2.88%
1881	3,942	+1.46%
1886	4,928	+4.57%
1891	6,058	+4.22%
1896	6,247	+0.62%
1901	6,729	+1.50%

Year	Pop.	±% p.a.
1906	7,433	+2.01%
1911	8,030	+1.56%
1921	5,935	−2.98%
1926	10,156	+11.34%
1931	10,267	+0.22%
1936	10,554	+0.55%
1946	8,244	−2.44%
1954	10,040	+2.49%
1962	10,774	+0.89%
1968	12,880	+3.02%
1975	17,182	+4.20%
1982	21,205	+3.05%
1990	24,325	+1.73%
1999	25,773	+0.64%
2007	30,645	+2.19%
2012	26,595	−2.80%
2017	26,672	+0.06%
2023	29,259	+1.55%

Source: EHESS and INSEE (1968–2023)

== Twin towns – sister cities ==
Vallauris is twinned with:

- Hódmezővásárhely, Hungary
- Lindenberg im Allgäu, Germany

== See also ==
Communes of the Alpes-Maritimes department
