= Roquefort-les-Pins =

Commune in Provence-Alpes-Côte d'Azur, France

- Commune
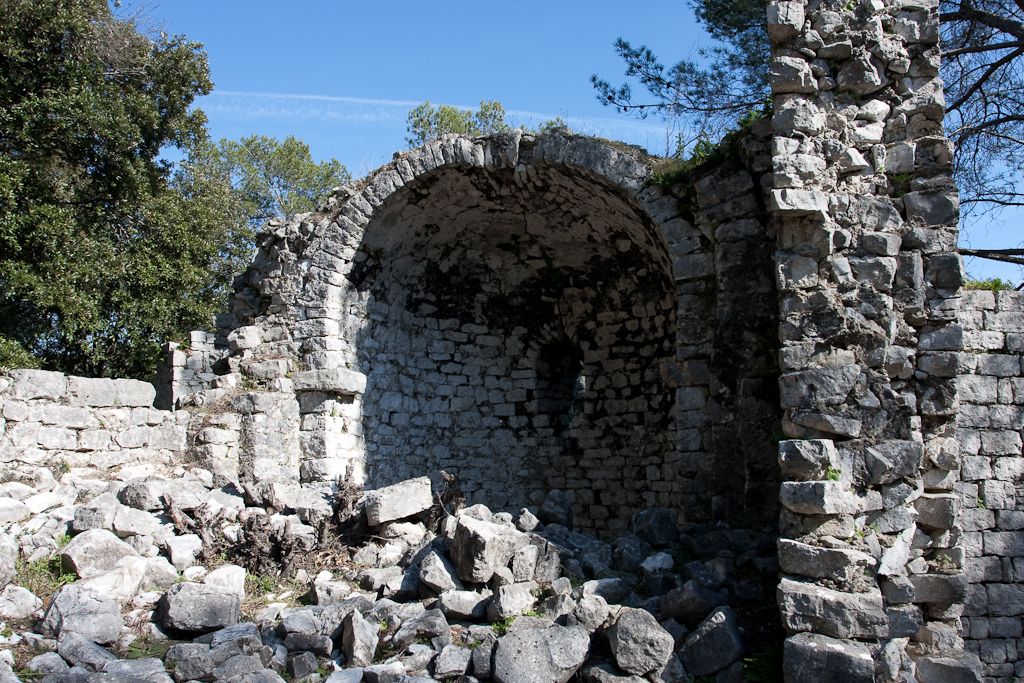
- Ruins of the chateau

- Coat of arms
- Location of Roquefort-les-Pins
- Location within France Location within Provence-Alpes-Côte d'Azur
- Coordinates: 43°39′59″N 7°03′05″E
- Country: France
- Region: Provence-Alpes-Côte d'Azur
- Department: Alpes-Maritimes
- Arrondissement: Grasse
- Canton: Villeneuve-Loubet
- Intercommunality: CA Sophia Antipolis

Government
  - Mayor (2026–32): Ewan Corinaldesi
- Area^{1}: 21.53 km^{2} (8.31 sq mi)
- Highest elevation: 362 m (1,188 ft)
- Lowest elevation: 20 m (66 ft)
- Population (2023): 7,292
  - Density: 338.7/km^{2} (877.2/sq mi)
- Time zone: UTC+01:00 (CET)
  - Summer (DST): UTC+02:00 (CEST)
- INSEE/Postal code: 06105 /06330
- ^{1} French Land Register data, which excludes lakes, ponds, glaciers > 1 km^{2} (0.386 sq mi or 247 acres) and river estuaries.

Roquefort-Les-Pins (French pronunciation: [ʁɔkfɔʁ le pɛ̃]; Occitan: Ròcafòrt lei Pins) is a commune in the Alpes-Maritimes department in the Provence-Alpes-Côte d'Azur region in southeastern France.

== Economy and industry ==
Shops: grocery stores, hair salons, office, pharmacies, newsagents, hardware, nursery. Industry: personal services. Hotels and restaurants. petrol stations. estate agencies, Building surveyor. Medical centre, dentist, podiatrist, speech therapists, nurses. post office. College, primary School and nursery care. Catholic primary school. Cinema. Library. Hall. Stables. Sports centre (large multi-sport gym hall, skate park) . assorted associations and clubs. Fire brigade and Gendarmerie. Football and tennis club with artificial pitches and courts.

== Situation and development ==
The village is situated between 200 and 300 metres above sea level. Roquefort-Les-Pins is surrounded by a pine forest and rocky landscape, making it a picturesque Cote D'azur village. The river Miagne is situated to the north of the commune, running parallel to the D7 national road. The commune is cut into 4 zones expanding from the center: A heavily forested zone, a sparsely populated zone, a moderately populated zone and a densely populated zone.

During the past decade, to help satisfy a growing population, the town has invested in several new developments and improvements to community services and buildings, these include:

-extension and renovation of the primary school -creating a sports complex (stadium, tennis courts) -creating a sports area (track, basketball court) -establishment of a college -creation of a skate park -creation of a town centre (in progress) -implementation of social housing -development of a village centre with housing (in progress) -creation of a health centre (planned) -expansion of the town hall (in progress) -beautification of the main axis -reconstruction of the fire station (planned) -modernisation of the canteen

== Public transport ==
The town is served by various bus lines that lead to nearby villages such as Valbonne and Sophia Antipolis

== Population ==
Historical population

Year	Pop.	±% p.a.
1793	611	—
1821	751	+0.74%
1846	756	+0.03%
1872	676	−0.43%
1901	550	−0.71%
1926	548	−0.01%
1946	494	−0.52%
1962	1,123	+5.27%
1968	1,575	+5.80%

Year	Pop.	±% p.a.
1975	2,507	+6.87%
1982	3,432	+4.59%
1990	4,714	+4.05%
1999	5,239	+1.18%
2007	6,175	+2.08%
2012	6,222	+0.15%
2017	6,762	+1.68%
2023	7,292	+1.27%

Source: EHESS and INSEE (1968-2023)

== See also ==
- Communes of the Alpes-Maritimes department
