= École des Beaux-Arts =

Influential art schools in France

Coordinates: 48°51′24″N 2°20′01″E

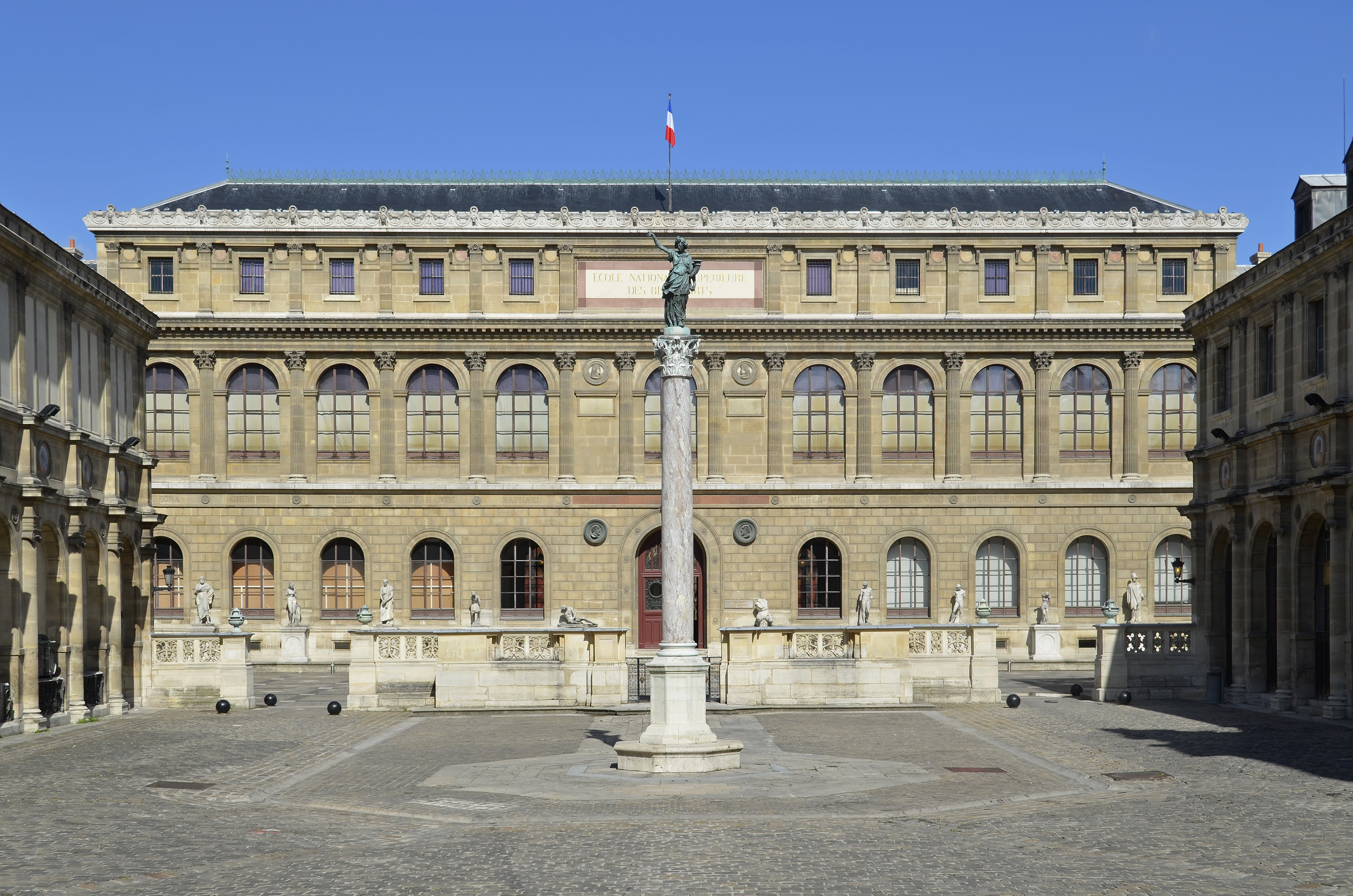
Palais des études of the École nationale supérieure des Beaux-Arts, Paris

École des Beaux-Arts (French for 'School of Fine Arts'; pronounced [ekɔl de boz‿aʁ]) refers to a number of influential art schools in France. The term is associated with the Beaux-Arts style in architecture and city planning that thrived in France and other countries during the late nineteenth century and the first quarter of the twentieth century.

The most famous and oldest École des Beaux-Arts is the École nationale supérieure des Beaux-Arts in Paris, now located on the city's left bank across from the Louvre, at 14 rue Bonaparte (in the 6th arrondissement). The school has a history spanning more than 350 years, training many of the great artists and architects in Europe. Beaux-Arts style was modeled on classical "antiquities", preserving these idealized forms and passing the style on to future generations.

== History ==
The origins of the Paris school go back to 1648, when the Académie des Beaux-Arts was founded by Cardinal Mazarin to educate the most talented students in drawing, painting, sculpture, engraving, architecture and other media. Louis XIV was known to select graduates from the school to decorate the royal apartments at Versailles, and in 1863, Napoleon III granted the school independence from the government, changing the name to "L'École des Beaux-Arts". Women were admitted beginning in 1897.

The curriculum was divided into the "Academy of Painting and Sculpture" and the "Academy of Architecture". Both programs focused on classical arts and architecture from Ancient Greek and Ancient Roman culture. All students were required to prove their skills with basic drawing tasks before advancing to figure drawing and painting. This culminated in a competition for the Grand Prix de Rome, awarding a full scholarship to study in Rome. The three trials to obtain the prize lasted for nearly three months. Many of the most famous artists in Europe were trained here, including Géricault, Degas, Delacroix, Fragonard, Ingres, Moreau, Renoir, Seurat, Cassandre, and Sisley. Rodin however, applied on three occasions but was refused entry. Paul Cézanne applied twice but was turned down. Bernard was suspended for stylistic "errors".

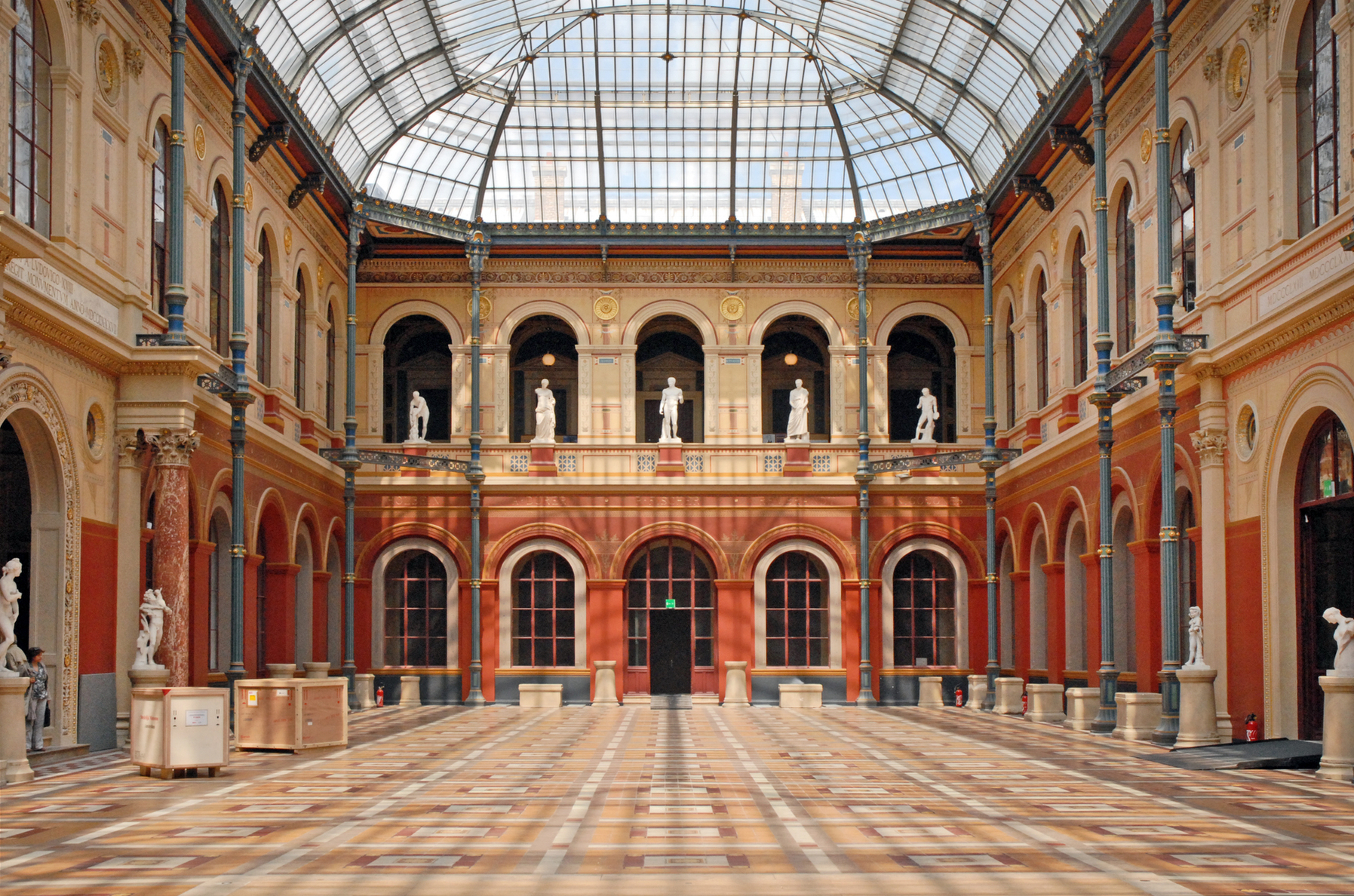
Courtyard of the École nationale supérieure des Beaux-Arts, Paris

The buildings of the school are largely the creation of French architect Félix Duban, who was commissioned for the main building in 1830. His work realigned the campus, and continued through 1861, completing an architectural program out towards the Quai Malaquais.

The Paris school is the namesake and founding location of the Beaux Arts architectural movement in the early twentieth century. Known for demanding classwork and setting the highest standards for education, the École attracted students from around the world—including the United States, where students returned to design buildings that would influence the history of architecture in America, including the Boston Public Library, 1888–1895 (McKim, Mead & White), the United States Supreme Court Building, 1932-1935 (Cass Gilbert, Cass Gilbert Jr., and John R. Rockart), and the New York Public Library, 1897–1911 (Carrère and Hastings). Architectural graduates, especially in France, are granted the title élève.

The architecture department was separated from the École after the May 1968 student strikes at the Sorbonne. The name was changed to École nationale supérieure des Beaux-Arts. Today, over 500 students make use of an extensive collection of classical art coupled with modern additions to the curriculum, including photography and hypermedia.

== Institutions ==
- ENSA École nationale des beaux arts de Dijon
- ENSA École nationale des beaux arts de Bourges
- ENSBA École nationale supérieure des beaux-arts de Lyon
- European Academy of Art (EESAB) in Lorient, Rennes, Quimper, and Brest
- ESADMM École supérieure d'art et de design Marseille-Méditerranée
- ENSA École nationale des beaux arts de Nancy
- École nationale supérieure des Beaux-Arts (ENSBA), Paris
- ESAD École supérieure d'art et design de Valence, Valence
- EBABX École supérieure des beaux-arts de Bordeaux
- École supérieure d'art | Dunkerque - Tourcoing (Esä), Dunkirk & Tourcoing
- ENSA École Nationale Supérieure d'Arts à la Villa Arson, Nice

== Notable instructors, Paris ==
- Marina Abramović
- Pierre Alechinsky
- Mirra Alfassa
- Louis-Jules André
- Antoine Berjon
- François Boisrond
- Christian Boltanski
- Léon Bonnat
- Duchenne de Boulogne
- Jean-Marc Bustamante
- Alexandre Cabanel
- Pierre Carron
- César
- Jean-François Chevrier
- Claude Closky
- Jules Coutan
- Leonardo Cremonini
- Richard Deacon
- Aimé-Jules Dalou
- Paul Delaroche
- Lin Fengmian
- Louis Girault
- Fabrice Hybert
- François Jouffroy
- Victor Laloux
- Paul Landowski
- Jean-Paul Laurens
- Charles Le Brun
- Michel Marot
- Annette Messager
- Gustave Moreau
- Jean-Louis Pascal
- Auguste Perret,
- Emmanuel Pontremoli
- Charles-Caïus Renoux
- Paul Richer
- Ary Scheffer
- Louis Sullivan, American architect, left after one year
- Pan Yuliang
- Lina Jaunez

== Notable alumni, Paris ==
- David Adler, architect, American
- Wahbi al-Hariri, architect, artist, American-Syrian
- August Friedrich Schenck, painter, French/German
- Nadir Afonso, painter, Portuguese
- Mardiros Altounian, architect, Armenian
- Rodolfo Amoedo, painter, Brazilian
- Émile André, architect, French
- Paul Andreu, French architect, 1968 graduate
- Théodore Ballu, architect
- Myron G. Barlow, painter, American
- Frederic Charles Hirons, architect, American
- Edward Bennett, architect, city planner
- Jules Benoit-Levy, painting
- Étienne-Prosper Berne-Bellecour, painter
- Robert Bery, painter
- Alexander Bogen, painter
- Wim Boissevain, painter, Dutch-Australian
- Maurice Boitel, painter
- Pierre Bonnard, painter
- Jacques Borker, tapestry designer, painter, sculptor, French artist.
- Joseph-Félix Bouchor, painter
- William-Adolphe Bouguereau, painter
- Antoine Bourdelle, sculptor, French
- Louis Bourgeois, architect, French Canadian
- George T. Brewster, sculptor, American
- Bernard Buffet, painter
- Carlo Bugatti, designer and furniture maker, Italian
- John James Burnet, architect
- Alexandre Cabanel
- Duncan Candler, architect, American
- Paul Chalfin, painter and designer, American
- Jean Chaleyé, painter and lace designer, French
- Charles Frédéric Chassériau, architect, French
- Alfred Choubrac, poster artist and costume designer, French
- Léon Choubrac, illustrator and poster artist, French
- Araldo Cossutta, architect, Yugoslavian-American
- Suzor-Coté, painter
- Henri Crenier, sculptor
- John Walter Cross, architect, American
- Cyrus Dallin, sculptor, American
- Jacques-Louis David, painter
- Gabriel Davioud, architect
- Marie-Abraham Rosalbin de Buncey, painter, French
- Edgar Degas, painter, French
- Eugène Delacroix, painter, French
- Jenny Eakin Delony, painter, American
- Constant-Désiré Despradelle, architect, French
- Hanna Eshel, (1926–2023), sculptor, Israeli-American
- Henry d'Estienne painter, French
- Félix Duban, architect, French
- Thomas Eakins, painter, American
- Harold Perry Erskine, sculptor and architect, American
- Pierre Farel, painter, French
- Ernest Flagg, architect, American
- Jean-Honoré Fragonard, painter, French
- Yitzhak Frenkel, Israeli French painter, father of modern Israeli art
- Meta Vaux Warrick Fuller, sculptor, painter, poet, American
- Fang Ganmin, painter, Chinese
- Charles Garnier, architect, French
- Tony Garnier, architect, French
- Adrien Étienne Gaudez, sculptor, French
- Théodore Géricault, painter, French
- Heydar Ghiaï-Chamlou, architect, Iranian
- Georges Gimel, painter, French
- Charles Ginner, painter
- Louis Girault, architect, French
- Hubert de Givenchy, fashion designer
- André Godard, designer of University of Tehran main campus
- Philip L. Goodwin, designer of the Metropolitan Museum of Art
- Alan Gourley – painter and stained glass artist
- Jean Baptiste Guth, portrait artist
- Emmeline Halse, sculptor
- L. Birge Harrison, painter
- Thomas Hastings, architect, American
- Robert Henri, painter and teacher, American
- George W. Headley, jeweler, designer, American.
- Yves Hernot, Painting, photographer
- Auguste Alexandre Hirsch, painter, lithographer, French
- Frank Howell Holden, architect, American
- Raymond Mathewson Hood, architect, American
- Mary Rockwell Hook, architect, American
- Henry Hornbostel, architect, American
- Richard Morris Hunt, architect, American
- Jean Auguste Dominique Ingres, painter, French
- Tove Jansson, painter and illustrator, Finnish
- Sadik Kaceli, painter, Albanian
- Mati Klarwein, painter
- Constantin Kluge, painter, Russian
- György Kornis, painter, Hungarian
- Gaston Lachaise, sculptor, French-American
- Victor Laloux, architect, French
- Charles Landelle, painter, French
- Jules Lavirotte, architect, French
- Paul Leroy painter, French
- Charles-Amable Lenoir painter, French
- Stanton Macdonald-Wright, painter, American
- Joseph Margulies, painter
- Albert Marquet, painter, French
- William Sutherland Maxwell, architect
- Bernard Maybeck, architect, American
- Annette Messager, installationist, multi-media
- Jean-François Millet, painter, Norman
- Yasuo Mizui, sculptor, Japanese
- Gustave Moreau, painter, French
- Julia Morgan, architect, American
- Ngo Viet Thu, architect, Vietnamese
- Victor Nicolas, sculptor, French
- Francisco Oller, painter, Puerto Rican
- Ong Schan Tchow (alias Yung Len Kwui), painter
- Pascual Ortega Portales, painter, Chilean
- Alphonse Osbert, painter, French
- J. Harleston Parker, architect, American
- Jean-Louis Pascal, architect
- André Pavlovsky, architect
- Albert Pennoyer, artist and soldier in the Monuments Men
- Georges Petetin, painter, French
- Albert Pissis, architect
- Théophile Poilpot, painter, French
- John Russell Pope, architect, American
- Anita Porchet, watch enameller, Swiss
- James Otis Post, architect, American
- Robert Poughéon, painter, French
- Fernand Préfontaine, architect and art critic, Canadian
- Edmond Jean de Pury, painter, Swiss
- S. H. Raza, painter, Indian
- Neel Reid, architect, American
- Pierre-Auguste Renoir, painter
- Arthur W. Rice, architect, American
- Gustave Rives, architect
- Cécilia Rodhe, sculptor
- James Gamble Rogers, architect, American
- Kanuty Rusiecki, painter, Polish
- Augustus Saint-Gaudens, sculptor, American
- John Singer Sargent, painter, American
- Bojan Šarčević, sculptor
- Louis-Frederic Schützenberger, painter, French
- Georges Seurat, painter, French
- Joann Sfar, designer
- Amrita Sher-Gil, painter, Indian
- Nicolas Sicard painter, French
- Högna Sigurðardóttir, architect, Icelandic
- Alfred Sisley, painter
- Clarence Stein, designer
- Yehezkel Streichman, painter
- Lorado Taft, sculptor
- Agnes Tait, painter, lithographer
- Vedat Tek, architect, Turkish
- Albert-Félix-Théophile Thomas, architect
- Edward Lippincott Tilton, architect, American
- Roland Topor, designer
- George Oakley Totten Jr., architect, American
- Edward Townsend Howes, architect and artist, American
- Morton Traylor, painter, American
- Guillaume Tronchet, architect
- Christos Tzivelos, Greek artist
- Valentino, fashion designer
- William Van Alen, architect
- Vann Molyvann, architect, Cambodian
- Gisèle d'Ailly van Waterschoot van der Gracht, artist, Dutch
- Lydia Venieri, painter, Greek
- Jesús Carles de Vilallonga, painter, Spanish
- Carlos Raúl Villanueva, architect
- Lucien Weissenburger, architect
- Yan Wenliang, painter, Chinese
- Norval White, architect, American
- Ivor Wood, animator and director, Anglo-French
- Alice Morgan Wright, sculptor, American
- Marion Sims Wyeth, architect, American
- Jack Youngerman, painter, American
- Georges Zipélius, illustrator, French
- Jacques Zwobada, sculptor, French of Czech origins

== See also ==
- Architecture of Paris
- Beaux-Arts architecture
- Comité des Étudiants Américains de l'École des Beaux-Arts Paris
- Paris Salon
