= Joseph Margulies =

Joseph Margulies may refer to:

- Joseph Margulies (artist) (1896–1984), Vienna-born American painter and printmaker
- Joseph Margulies (lawyer), American attorney
