= Minangoy =

Minangoy is surname found in France. People bearing this include:

- André Minangoy, a French architect
- Georges Minangoy, a French film director
- Jean Philibert de Minangoy, a major of Colmar
