= War Powers: The Politics of Constitutional Authority =

2013 book by Mariah Zeisberg

- Author: Mariah Zeisberg
- Language: English
- Subject: Constitution of the United States, President of the United States, constitutional authority, war-making, war powers
- Genre: Non-fiction
- Publisher: Princeton University Press
- Publication date: 2013
- Publication place: United States
- Pages: 276
- Awards: Richard E. Neustadt Prize (2014)
- ISBN: 978-0-691-15722-1

War Powers: The Politics of Constitutional Authority is a 2013 book by Mariah Zeisberg that studies war powers in the United States.

== Critical reception ==
Benjamin J. Keele wrote in the International Journal of Legal Information that he "recommended [the book] for academic collections in law and political science". He praised its "interesting examples" of conflict between the executive and legislative branches and exercises of war powers but criticized the lack of a bibliography. Bruce Peabody of Fairleigh Dickinson University said the book is a "creative and ambitious account" that "deserves further development, defense, and elaboration", citing how it pertains to separation of powers issues not limited to wartime conflicts. Ohio University's Kimberley L. Fletcher called the book "a valuable, systematic, and insightful examination of an important aspect of the war powers debate". In his review of the work, Cornell University professor Joseph Margulies said the author "carefully unpacks the language and structure of the Constitution" and offers "a nuanced appraisal" of the executive and legislative branches' proportional power and constraints regarding war power.

== Prizes ==
War Powers won the 2014 Richard E. Neustadt Prize for the best book on executive politics, awarded by the American Political Science Association. The award committee included Andrew Rudalevige, Bert Rockman, Mark Peterson, Karen Hult, and Rod Hart.
