= Frédéric Marguet =

French naval officer

- Born: 11 June 1874; Algiers
- Died: 2 June 1951 (aged 76); Villeneuve-Loubet

Academic background
- Education: École navale

Academic work
- Discipline: maritime navigation naval architecture
- Institutions: École navale
- Notable works: Cours d'astronomie de l'École Navale; Cours de navigation et de compas

Fréderic Marguet (Algiers, 11 June 1874 — Villeneuve-Loubet, 2 June 1951) was a French Navy officer. He was a prominent professor of navigation for students of the École navale and merchant navy, and authored a number of courses on the practice and history of maritime navigation.

== Biography ==
Marguet started studying at the École navale in 1891. He graduated first of his class. After serving at sea for a dozen years, he returned to the École navale as a professor, first in naval architecture, then in astronomy and navigation. He spent the rest of his career there, first as an active duty officer, and later as a professor in residence, a status reserved for officers with special abilities.

After reaching the age limit in 1933, with the rank of captain, Marguet remained at the École navale as a civilian archivist secretary, in fact working as a Director of studies. He retired in Paris in 1937, and later in Villeneuve-Loubet in 1940.

Marguet authored two reference textbook: Cours d'astronomie de l'École Navale and Cours de navigation et de compas.

He also authored history books: Histoire de la longitude à la mer au XVIIIe siècle about the history of longitude, and Histoire générale de la navigation du XVe au XXe siècle.

== Works ==
- Marguet, Frédéric (1913). Cours de navigation et de compas de l'École navale. Paris: Challamel. OCLC 31713272.
- Marguet, Frédéric (1916). Cours d'astronomie de l'École navale. Paris: Challamel. OCLC 1002104874.
- Marguet, Frédéric (1917). Histoire de la longitude à la mer au XVIIIe siècle, en France. Paris: Challamel. OCLC 612710194.
- Marguet, Frédéric (1931). Histoire générale de la navigation du XVe au XXe siècle. Paris: Société d'éditions géographiques, maritimes et coloniales. OCLC 424071897.
- Marguet, Frédéric (1934). La Distribution des marées à la surface du globe. Paris.
