= Maurice Aubert =

French oceanographer (1921–2012)

Maurice Aubert (1921–2012) was a French physician and oceanographer.

Aubert founded the Centre d’études et de Recherches de Biologie Marine et d’Océanographie Médicale (CERBOM), a research center dedicated to the study of "medical oceanography", in 1960. He also taught marine geography at the University of Nice and was Director of Research at INSERM. In 1990, he received an award for his activities from the Vatican. In 1995, Aubert founded the International University of the Sea (French: Université Internationale de la Mer) in Cagnes-sur-Mer. He taught there as a professor. Aubert has published over 250 academic works.

In 2022, a building in the harbour of Villeneuve-Loubet was dedicated to Aubert.

== Books ==
- Cultiver l'Océan. Presses Universitaires de France, Paris, 1965.
