= Michel Marot =

French architect (1926–2021)

- Born: 29 January 1926; Troyes, France
- Died: 24 August 2021 (aged 95)
- Occupation: Architect

Michel Marot (French: [miʃɛl maʁo]; 29 January 1926 – 24 August 2021) was a French architect.

== Biography ==
In 1945, Marot was admitted to the Beaux-Arts de Paris and graduated in 1950. After his degree, he studied at Harvard University. He earned the Prix de Rome to study at the Villa Medici from January 1955 to April 1958.

In 1963, Marot won the Prix de l'Équerre d'Argent for his design of the Église Sainte-Agnès de Fontaine-les-Grès. Thanks to being a recipient of the Prix de Rome, he was made responsible for overseeing the structural integrity of the Arc de Triomphe and the Archives Nationales. In 1970, he designed his most famous project, the Villa Arson in Nice. In 1965, he became a professor at the Beaux-Arts de Paris and later became President of the Société française des architectes. In 2010, the Église Sainte-Agnès de Fontaine-les-Grès was declared a historic monument.

Michel Marot died on 24 August 2021 at the age of 95.

== Works ==
- Église Sainte-Agnès de Fontaine-les-Grès (1956)
- Église Saint-François d'Assise (Champagne-sur-Seine, 1965)
- Villa Arson (Nice, 1965–1972)
- Église Saint-Jean-Bosco (1968, Meaux)
- Domaine de la Verboise (1969–1971, Garches)
- Marina Baie des Anges (1969–1993, Villeneuve-Loubet)
- Passerelle du Parc du Val-Joly (1985, Eppe-Sauvage)
