= Constantin Kluge =

French artist

- Born: 29 January 1912; Riga, Russian Empire
- Died: 9 January 2003 (aged 90); France
- Occupation: Painter

Constantin Kluge (1912–2003) was a painter originally from Russia. Raised mostly in Manchuria and Beijing, Kluge eventually settled in Paris and became a French citizen. He is known for his French landscapes and romantic scenes of Paris.

== Biography ==
Constantin Kluge was born on January 29, 1912, in Riga, then a large industrial port city in the Russian Empire.

Kluge was born into a family of means and some status. His paternal grandfather had spent years in France studying the cultivation of vines and wine making. Returning to Russia he developed a successful winery. Kluge's father, also Constantin, was a member of the Russian Army General Staff and a White Army sympathizer. Kluge's mother, Liouba Ignatieva, was an academic who also came from a military family. When his parents met, young Liouba was serving as tutor to the children of Russian Grand Duke Michel, the younger brother of Czar Nicholas II. The family moved often, following Constantin Sr.'s deployments with the counter-rebellion armies. Each move seemed to take the family further and further east as the revolution spread and the White Sympathizers controlled a decreasing part of the country.

Kluge settled in Paris in 1950, and thereafter, found representation in a French gallery on Rue Saint-Honore. In 1964, he became a citizen of France.

Kluge was married three times and had one child, Michel. His first wife and child's mother was Tania de Liphart. Kluge's second wife was Mary Starr (née Malcolm), the former wife of AIG Founder Neil Starr. Kluge died on 9 January 2003 in France.

== Early life ==
In the winter of 1919–1920, the family traveled via train to Harbin, Manchuria. Living in Manchuria, Kluge first discovered an interest in art while learning Chinese. Kluge enjoyed the beauty of drawing the characters of Mandarin using proper technique for holding the brush.

Eventually, with the situation in Manchuria changing, the family moved to Beijing. At school in Beijing, Kluge was first introduced to formal art study, studying under the direction of the Russian artist Podgursky Chernomyrdin. Although he demonstrated talent as an artist, he would pursue architecture in France.

In Paris, Kluge earned admission into the École des Beaux Arts to study architecture and in 1937 he earned his diploma. His intention had been to return to Beijing, but he was stymied by his desire to paint the river banks, bridges, and streets of Paris he had come to love. He chose to spend six months painting Paris after graduating, after which he returned east to Shanghai, not Beijing.

== Artistic career ==
In Shanghai, world events helped force Kluge to paint. As an aspiring architect, he took a job in the office that processed building permits for the Shanghai French Concession. With the outbreak of the war, building nearly ceased as raw materials were being confiscated by the Japanese for their military. Kluge filled his time with painting.

In 1946, as foreigners were flooding out of Shanghai, Kluge moved to Hong Kong, continuing to work as an architect and painting in his free time. After friends persuaded him to exhibit his works publicly, he began to exhibit his paintings of Paris around China, to much success. Realizing that his hobby of painting, which he had never considered as a possibility as a career, could actually support him and his family, Kluge made the decision to pursue a career in art full time.

in 1950, Kluge moved back to Paris, leaving China for good and resolving to become a professional painter. His background in architecture informed the architectural and structural accuracy of his paintings of Parisian buildings. In his first salon, the Paris Salon in 1951, his paintings won awards and garnered a fair amount of attention.

In the 1960s, Kluge's work caught the eye of American art dealer Wally Findlay, of Wally Findlay Galleries. Findlay began to represent Kluge, bringing his Parisian paintings to America and showing them in his galleries in New York, Chicago, and Los Angeles. Kluge continued to achieve great success in his artistic career, receiving several awards and honors, and showing his works across Europe and America.

== Christianity ==
As a young man in China, Kluge became focused on his Christianity, and befriended several Jesuit missionaries including Pierre Teilhard de Chardin and Pierre Leroy. Their correspondence and notes on their friendship are housed in the Georgetown University Library's special collections.

== Major exhibitions ==
- 1951 - Salon de Paris
- 1961 - Salon des Artistes Francais
- 1961 - Wally Findlay Galleries: New York, Chicago, Los Angeles
- 1962 - Salon des Artistes Francais
- 1992 - Musée Antoine Vivenel, Compiègne, France

== Awards ==
- 1961 - Silver Medal, Salon des Artistes Francais
- 1961 - Salon des Artistes Francais, Taylor Foundation's Raymond Perreau Prize
- 1962 - Gold Medal, Salon des Artistes Francais
- 1990 - Chevalier de la Legion d'Honneur
