= Henry d'Estienne =

French painter

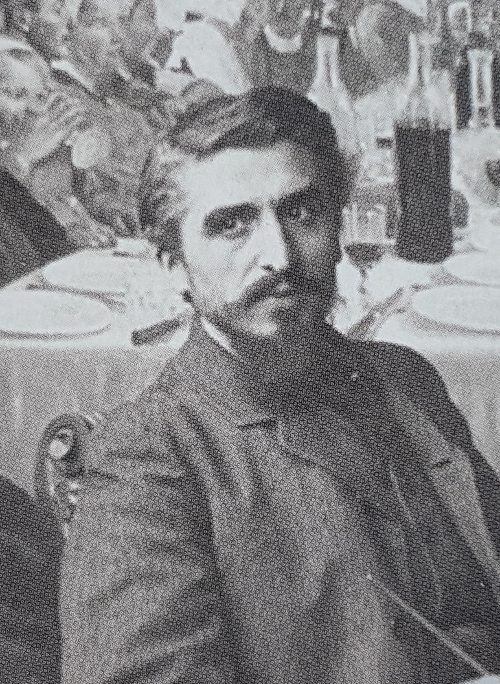
- Born: 1 August 1872; Conques-sur-Orbiel, France
- Died: 11 March 1949 (aged 78); Paris, France
- Known for: Painting, drawing
- Movement: Orientalism

Henry d'Estienne (1 August 1872 – 11 March 1949) was a French painter and a member of the Académie des Beaux-Arts.

== Biography ==
Henry d'Estienne was the son of a French sculptor.

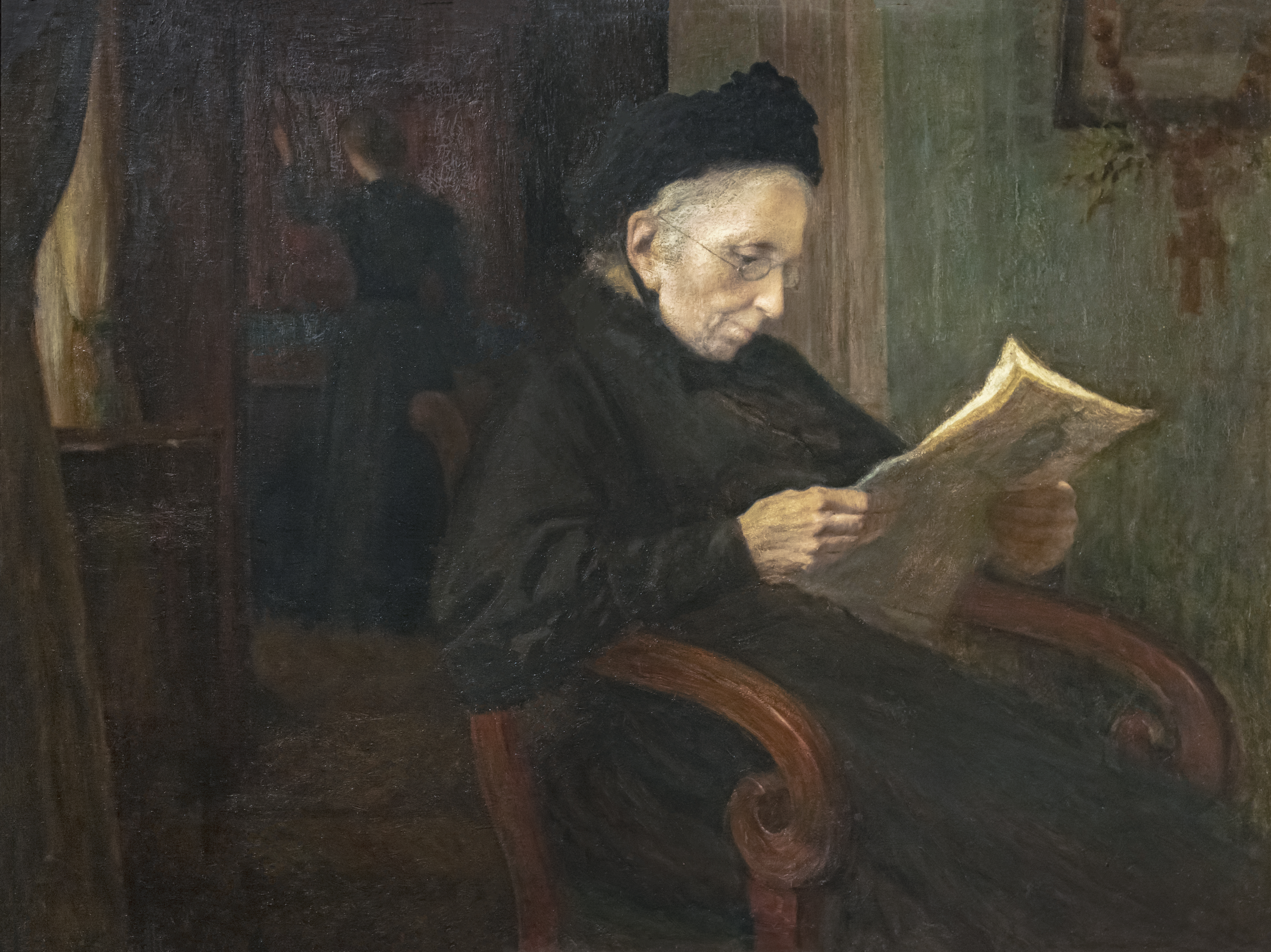
Portrait de Grand-mère (1899)

D'Estienne studied in Carcassonne and in Montpellier before moving to Paris where he attended the Ếcole Nationale des Arts Décoratifs before being taken on by the Ếcole des Beaux-Arts and enrolled as a student of Jean-Léon Gérôme.

D’Estienne made his debut at the Salon of the Société des Artistes Français in 1896. Three years later he exhibited a portrait of his grandmother which was purchased by the State on behalf of the Musée des Beaux-Arts in Carcassonne. The painting, today in the Musée d’Orsay, also won the artist a bronze medal at the Exposition Universelle of 1900, for which he also painted a landscape diorama of the coast of Somalia that earned him an appointment as painter to the Ministère des Colonies. A trip to Spain, Morocco, Algeria, Tunisia, Sicily and Venice resulted in a number of paintings and pastel drawings which he later exhibited at both the Société des Artistes Français and the Société des Peintres Orientalistes Français. One of these paintings, a portrait of an old woman in the costume of a native of the province of Aragon in Spain, was acquired in 1902 for the Musée du Luxembourg and is today also in the Musée d’Orsay.

Henry d’Estienne is perhaps best known today as a painter of Orientalist subjects. He travelled to Turkey and Egypt, and between 1927 and 1929 his work was exhibited in Cairo and Alexandria. He received a number of portrait commissions from Egyptian dignitaries, with King Fouad I owning several of his works. He also took part in the Expositions Artistiques de l’Afrique Française, and contributed to the Salons of the Société Coloniale des Artistes Français. His reputation as an Orientalist painter led to his appointment as a member of the fine arts commission and jury for the great Exposition Coloniale Internationale held in Paris in 1931. Apart from his extensive travels throughout the Near East and North Africa, d’Estienne also spent much time in Brittany throughout his career. He was particularly drawn to the depiction of Breton customs, rituals, festivals and costumes, and this resulted in such paintings as "A Feast in Brittany", exhibited at the Salon of 1904 and bought for the Musée du Luxembourg. (Other genre scenes of Breton life are in the Museo des Bellas Artes in Buenos Aires.) After the First World War, d’Estienne seems to have devoted himself mainly to portraiture, exhibiting several paintings of his wife and daughter, among other sitters. His works were exhibited at a number of Parisian galleries, notably the Galerie Georges Petit and Galerie Bernheim, and he was also a member of the Cercle de l’Union Artistique. In 1937 d'Estienne won a gold medal at the Exposition Internationale in Paris. An auction of more than 270 paintings and drawings from the studio of the artist was held in Paris in 1998.

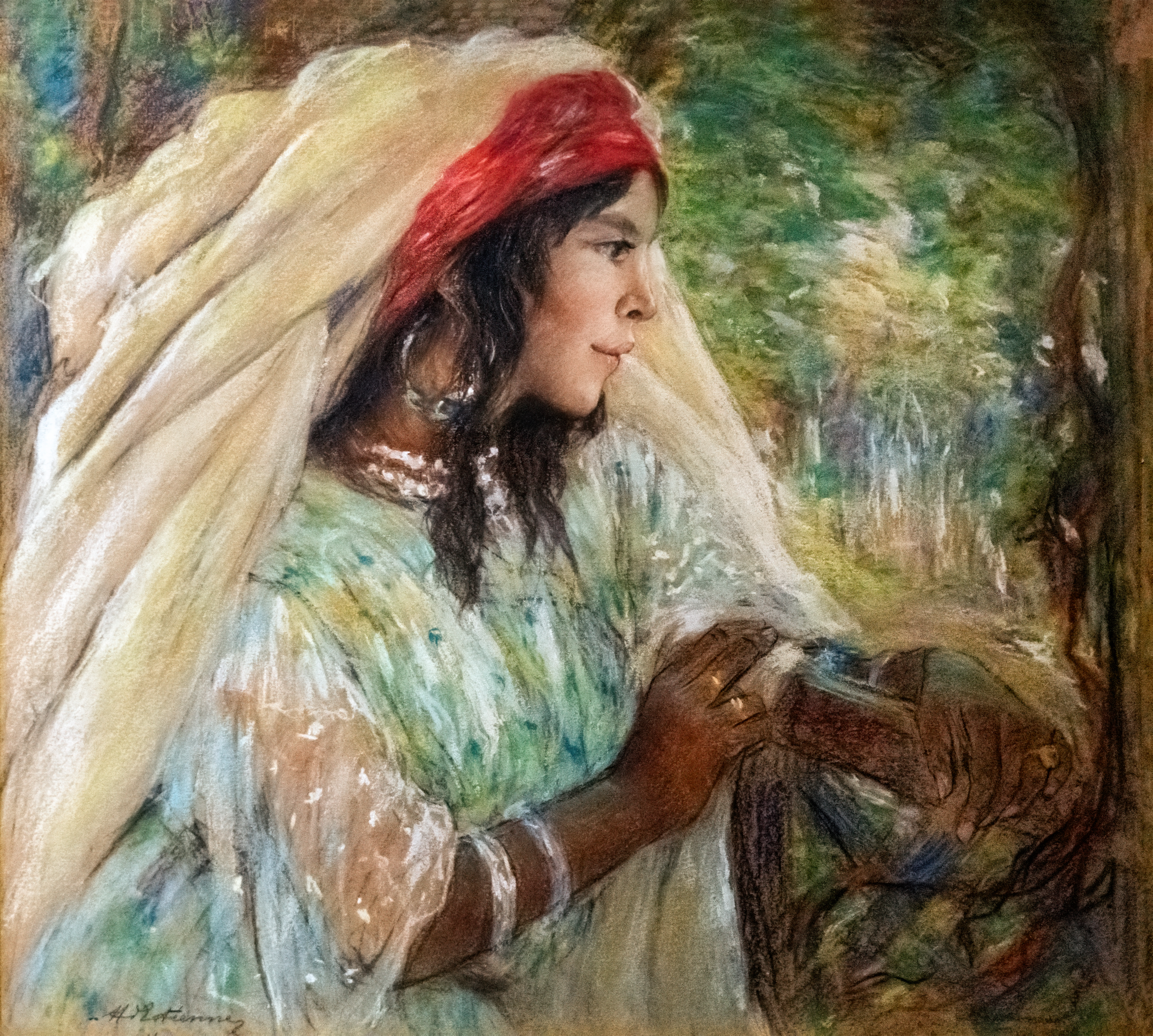
Jeune femme algérienne accoudée à la barrière - Musée des Beaux-Arts de Narbonne

== Works ==
- "Portrait de Grand-mère" (1899) Musée des beaux-arts de Carcassonne. He knows a first success with the purchase by the French State of his Portrait of Grand'Mère at the Salon of French artists of 1899.
- "Portrait de fillette ou Mademoiselle S". This oil on canvas painting dates to around 1913. It is held in the Musée d'Orsay. It was exhibited at the Salon de la Société des artistes français, Paris, in 1913.
- "Naïade". This oil on canvas painting is held in Brest's Musée des beaux-Arts.
- "Femme de Bou-Saada". This work in pastel is held in the Centre national des arts plastiques in Paris' Centre Pompidou.
- "Rêverie - Jeune femme algérienne accoudée à la barrière" An oil on canvas painting - Musée des Beaux-Arts de Narbonne.
- "Jeune fille arabe apportant le café". This 1912 work is held by the "Centre national des arts plastiques" in Paris.
- "Le Pain bénit". An oil on canvas painting held by the Musée de La Roche-sur-Yon.
- "Après le bain". An oil on canvas painting held by Limoux's Musée Petiet.
- "La Seguiah de Biskra". An oil on canvas painting held by Tournus's Musée Greuze.
- "Portrait de ma fille". This oil on canvas painting dates to around 1915. It is held by Courbevoie's Orphelinat des Arts.
- "Salle de repos d'un bain maure". This work dates to around 1917 and is held in the Paris Hôpital militaire du Val-de-Grâce.
- "Pasteur dans son laboratoire" This oil on canvas painting is held in Paris' Université de La Sorbonne.
- "Vieille femme d'Aragon". This 1902 oil on canvas painting is held in the Musée d'Orsay.
- "La Vérité". This oil on canvas painting dates to around 1896 and is held in Pont-de-Vaux's Musée Antoine Chintreuil.
- "Jeune fille tenant la tête d'Orphée". This oil on canvas painting dates to 1894. It is held by the Préfecture of Deux-Sèvres in Niort.
- "Fillette de Plougastel-Daoulas". This oil on canvas painting dates to 1912 and is held by the Nantes Musée des beaux-Arts.
- "Première communiante". This oil on canvas painting dates to 1898 and is held in the Musée d'Argentan.
- "Noce en Bretagne". This oil on canvas triptych dates to 1904 and is held in the Sénat in Paris.

== Honors and awards ==
- Knight of the Order of Legion of Honour
- Officer of the Imperial Order of the Dragon of Annam

== See also ==
- List of Orientalist artists
- Orientalism
