= Auguste Alexandre Hirsch =

French painter and lithographer

- Born: 8 July 1833; Lyon
- Died: 24 December 1912 (aged 79); Paris
- Known for: Painter, Lithographer
- Notable work: Calliope Teaching Orpheus, Night
- Awards: Officer of public instruction, Knight of the National Order of the Legion of Honour

Auguste Alexandre Hirsch (Note: Also known as Alexandre Auguste Hirsch.) (8 July 1833 - 24 December 1912) was a French Academic painter and lithographer. He was born in Lyon and died in Paris. He painted portraits, history and genre paintings, as well works inspired by classical mythology.

== Biography ==
Auguste Alexandre Hirsch was born in Lyon, into a Jewish family, and was the son of Alexandre Hirsch (1801-1890), a merchant embroiderer, and Rosalie Mayer (1801-1885). His siblings were Malvina Hirsch (1826-1917), Abraham Hirsch (1828-1913), the chief architect of the City of Lyon, Julie Hirsch (born in 1831) and Joseph Hirsch (1836-1901).

Auguste Alexandre Hirsch was a pupil of Victor Vibert at the École nationale supérieure des beaux-arts in Lyon between 1851 and 1854, and a student of Hippolyte Flandrin and Charles Gleyre at the École des beaux-arts in Paris, which he entered in 1856.

He made his debut in 1857 with a drawing of Moses. He then exhibited in Paris and Lyon from 1857 to 1909. He was given an honourable mention and a bronze medal in 1889 and 1890, as well as a gold medal in 1889, at the Universal Exhibition.

In 1870 he made a trip to Morocco, which inspired a number of his paintings depicting scenes from the community of Tetouan.

In 1877 he painted the ceiling of the Célestins theater in Lyon.

He was inspector of drawing education at the Fine Arts administration in 1879 and inspector of departmental museums in 1887. He wrote the article “Practical perspective” for the Dictionary of primary education and instruction.

On 29 August 1889 he was made a Knight of the National Order of the Legion of Honour (Chevalier de la Légion d'honneur).

Works by Auguste Alexandre Hirsch

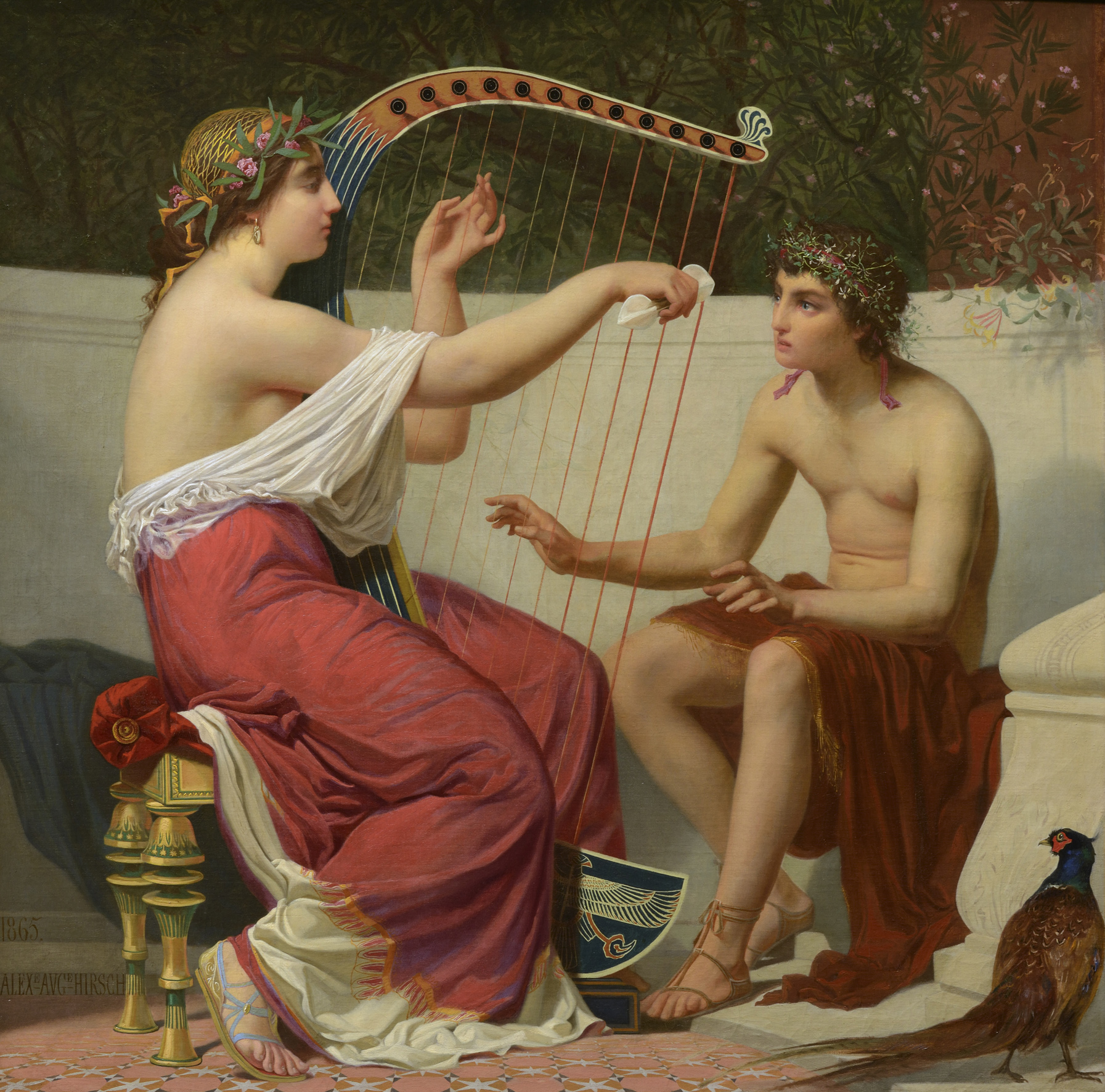
Calliope Teaching Orpheus (1865)

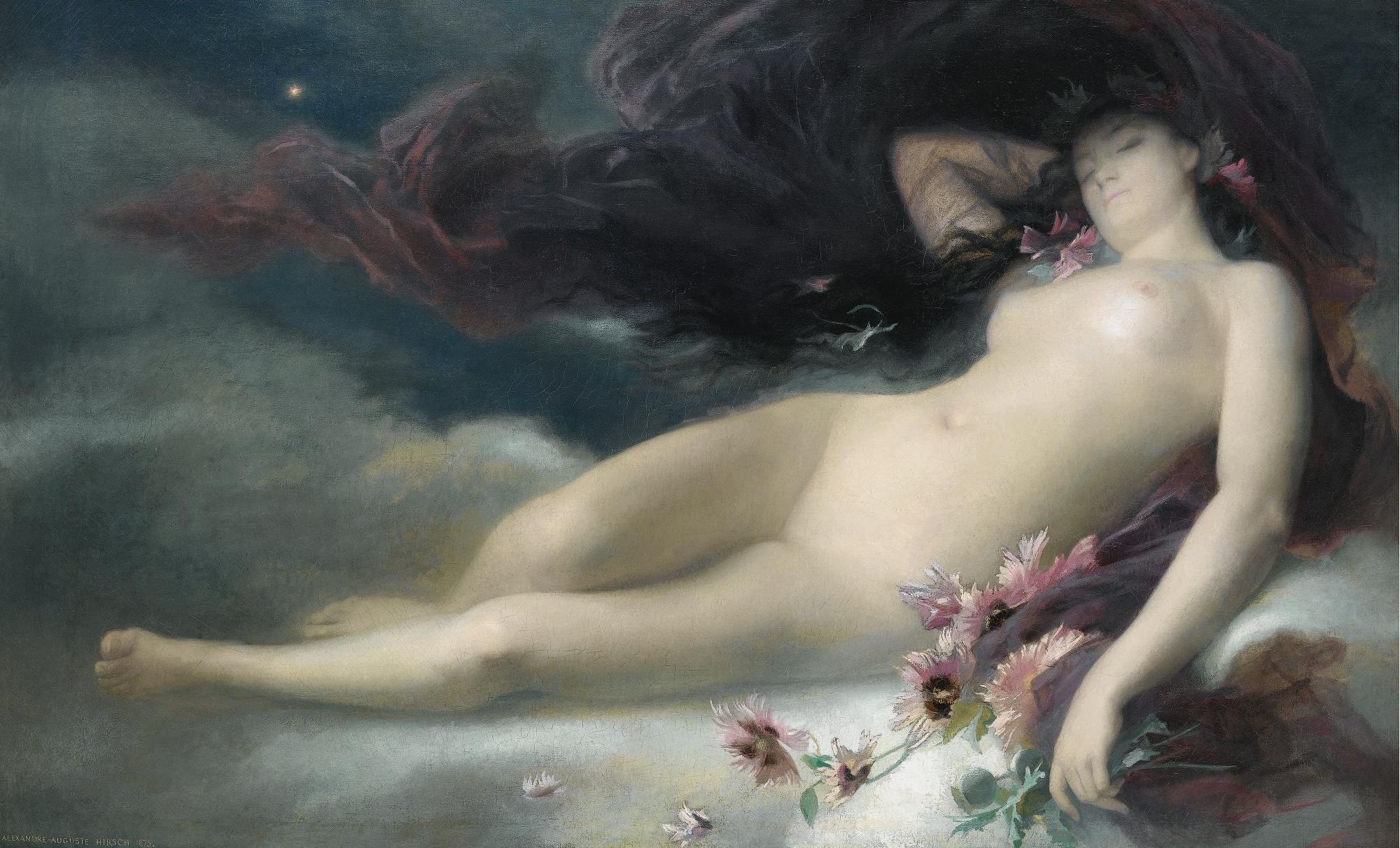
Night (1875)

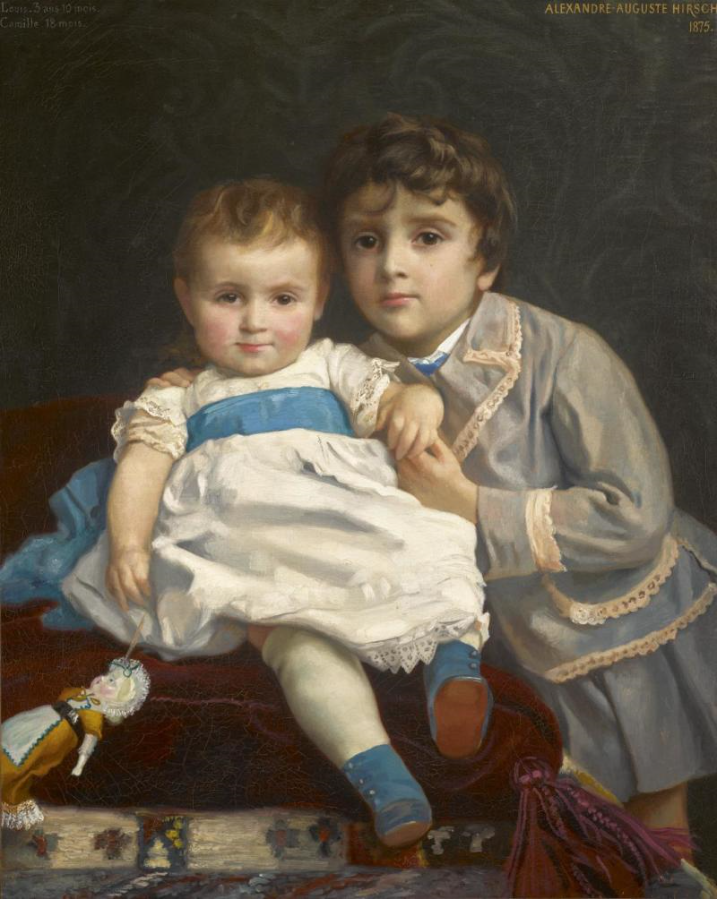
Camille and Louis (1875)

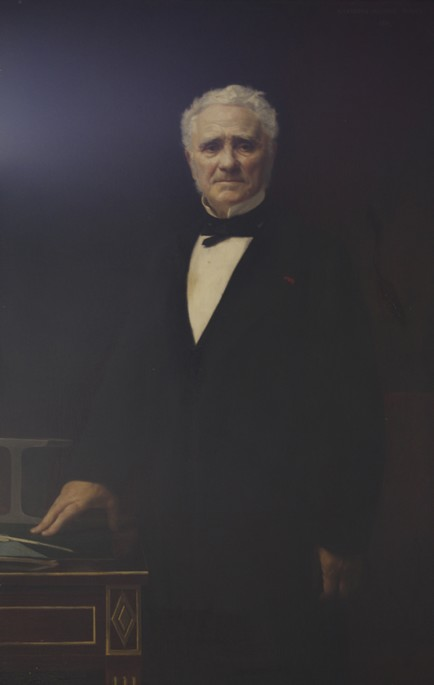
Samuel Auguste Dupont

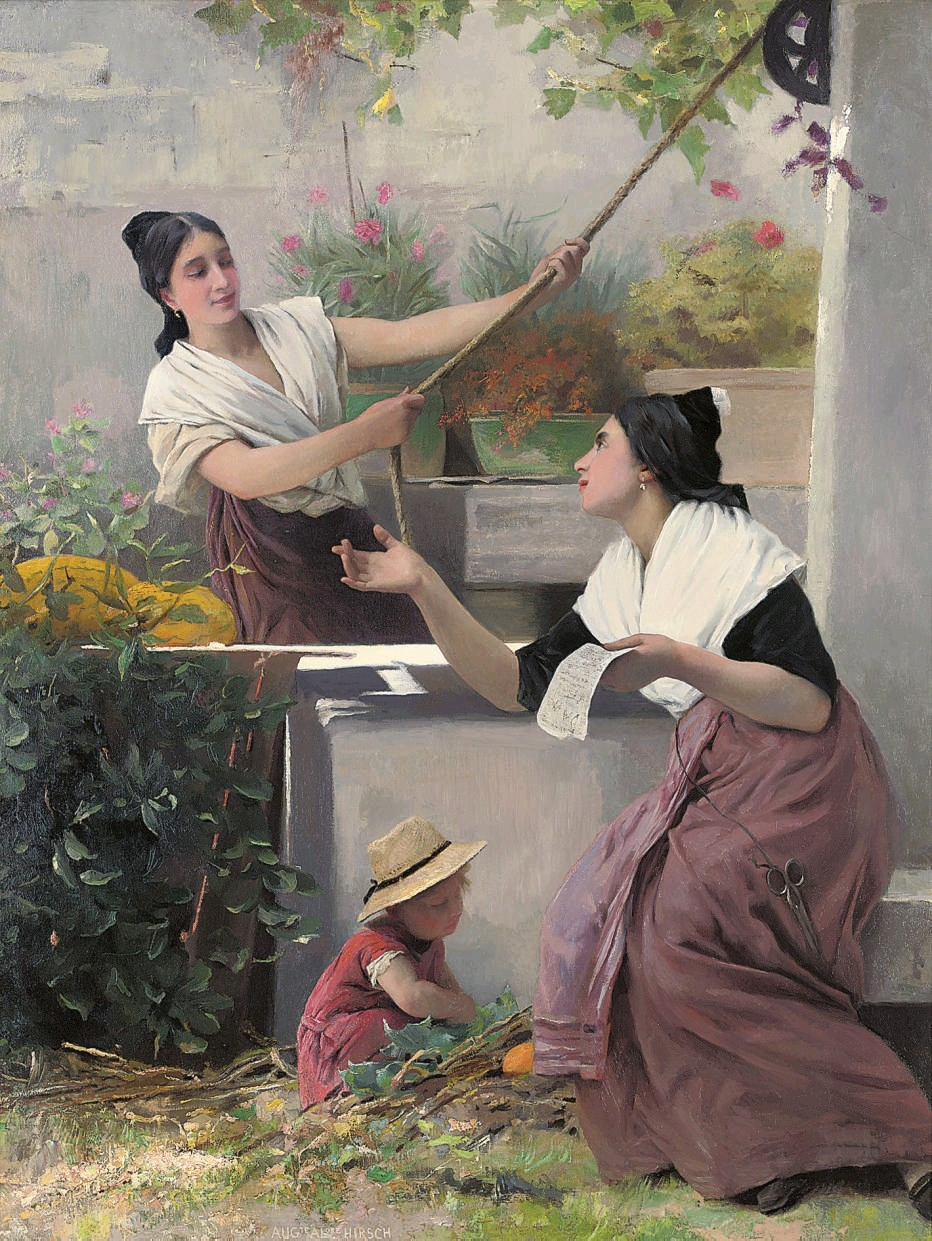
Gossips at the Well

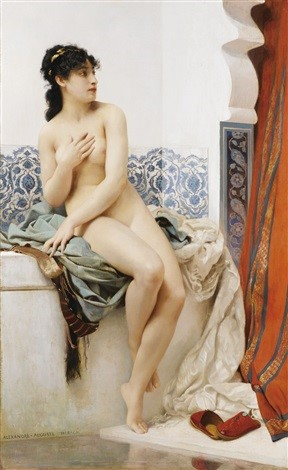
Suzanne

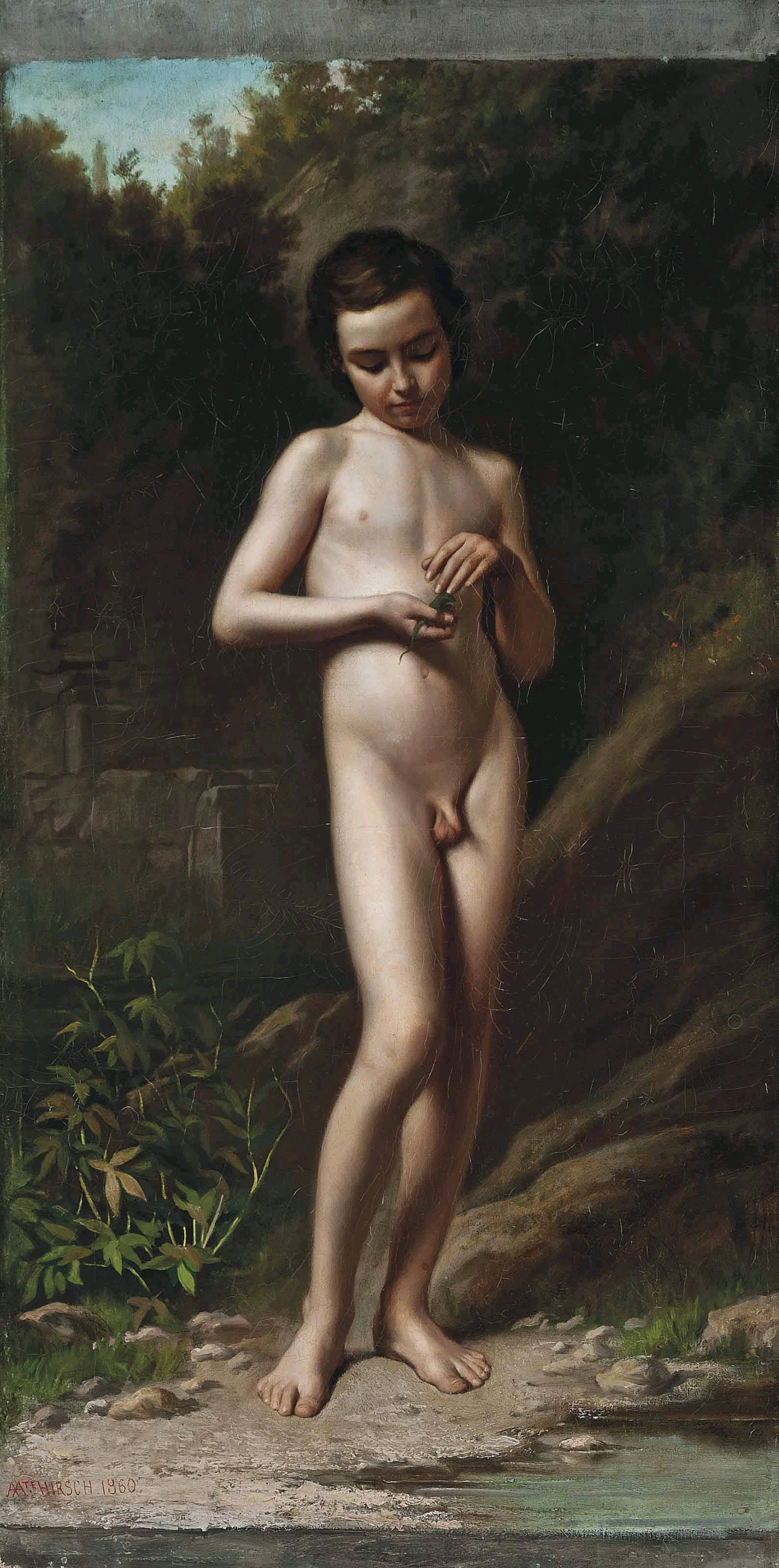
L’enfant au lézard (1860)

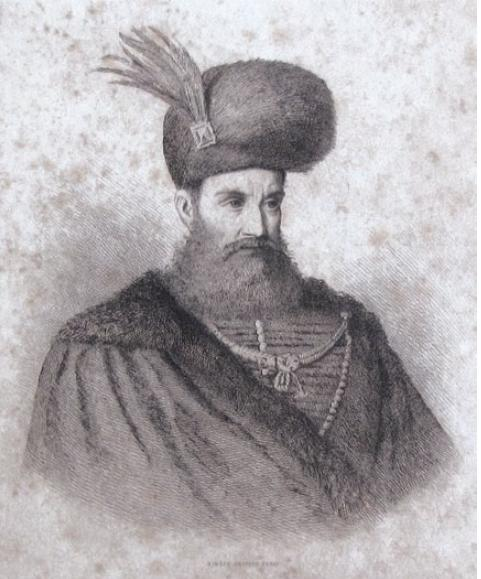
Michael the Brave (1860), lithography

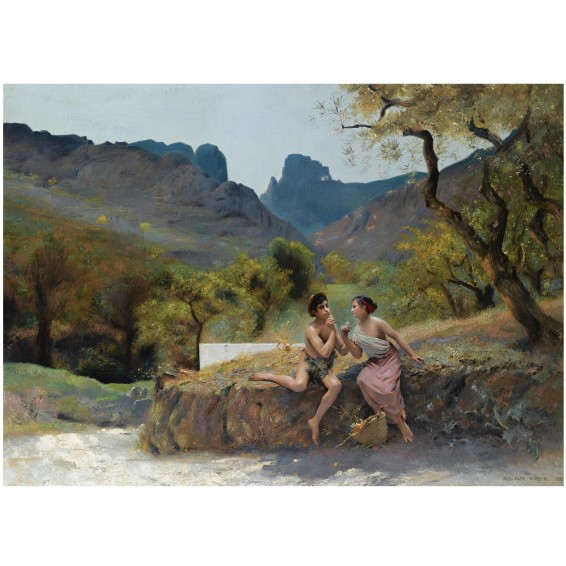
Flirtation in an Arcadian Landscape (1895)
