= Joseph Fuchs (1814–1888) =

French illustrator

- Born: 1814
- Died: 1888 (aged 73–74)
- Known for: Illustration

Josef Fuchs (1814-1888) was a French illustrator. He designed wallpaper. Works by Fuchs are held in the collection of the Cooper-Hewitt, National Design Museum and the Deutsches Tapetenmuseum. The wallpaper piece, El Dorado, in the collection of the Cooper-Hewitt, was co-designed by Fuchs and Eugène Ehrmann and Georges Zipélius. It took them two years to design it. The work is still in print to this day.
