= Agnes Tait =

American artist

- Born: June 14, 1894; New York City, US
- Died: August 23, 1981 (aged 87); Santa Fe, New Mexico
- Education: National Academy of Design École des Beaux-Arts
- Known for: Painting, printmaking, children's book illustrations
- Notable work: Skating in Central Park
- Spouse: William McNulty

Agnes Tait (June 14, 1894 – August 23, 1981) was an American painter, pen-and-ink artist, lithographer, book illustrator, muralist and dancer.

== Early life ==
Born in Greenwich Village in New York City, Agnes Tait was the second and last child of Anita Innocentia McCarthy and John C. Tait. Her mother was of Irish Catholic descent and travelled to New York from Cuba. Her father emigrated to America from Guernsey, in the Channel Islands, and owned a small roofing business. After graduating from grammar school, Tait secretly applied to the National Academy of Design much to her parents' surprise, who were happy at the prospect of a free tuition. She completed the mandatory antique drawing class from 1908 to 1910 and the life painting class from 1910 to 1916. As part of her studies, she attended the life drawing course taught by Leon Kroll. During her studies she earned multiple awards for her work, including the Hollgarten prizes for painting ($10) and composition ($30), a prize for pastel drawing ($10) as well as the Suydam bronze medal for life drawing. After graduating, she returned to Greenwich Village to take care of her terminally ill father. Determined to succeed as both a painter and a dancer, she painted during the day and danced in a chorus line at night, maintaining this lifestyle until the death of her father in 1919.

== Career ==
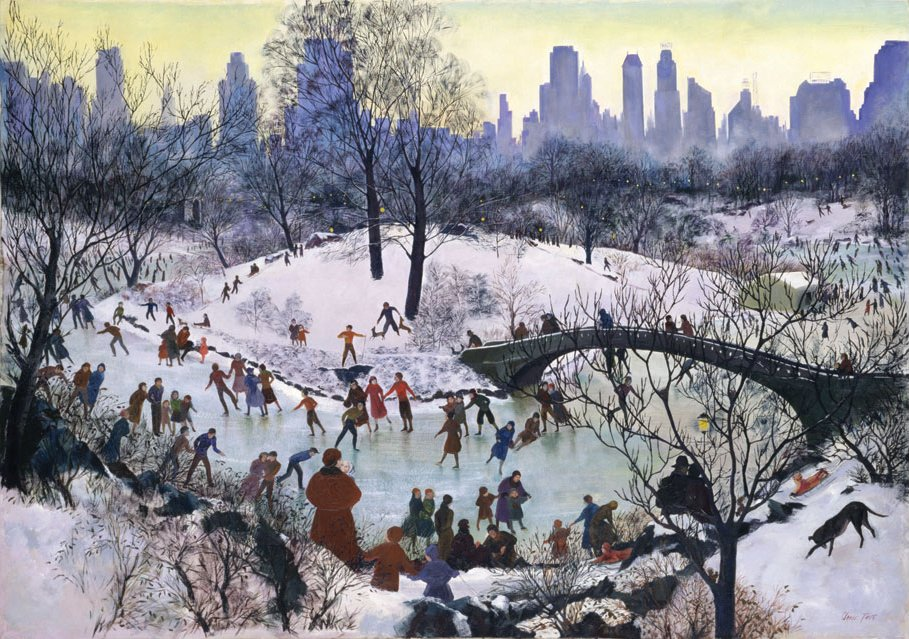
Tait's Skating in Central Park (1934)

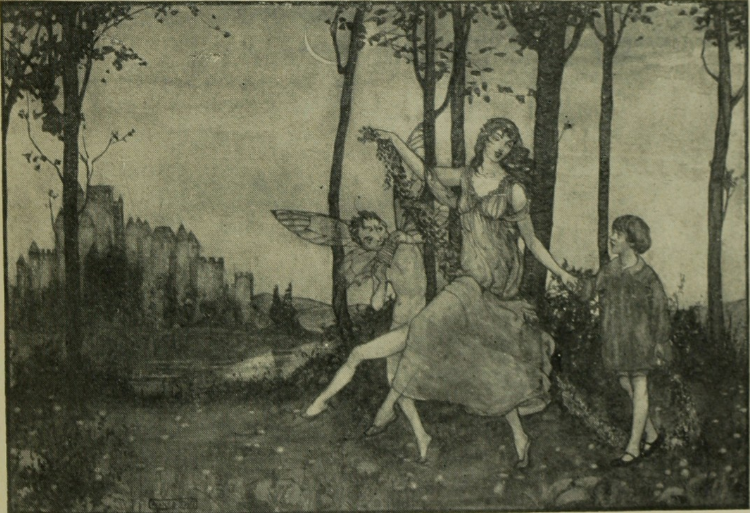
Black and white reproduction of Come Away, Oh Human Child, 1916 New York Watercolor Club Exhibition

Tait began exhibiting at the Art Institute of Chicago in 1915 and continued in the annuals at the National Academy of Design, the Corcoran, and the Pennsylvania Academy in the early 1930s. Her determination to succeed in her artistic endeavors prompted her to study in Paris. In 1927, Tait spent several weeks in a studio in Paris, where she completed a lithography course at the École des Beaux-Arts, before returning to New York City to rent her own studio in King Street in Lower Manhattan. Confident in her talent as an artist, she contacted Valentine Dudensing of the Dudensing Gallery, who asked her to "come in with her portfolio." Impressed with her work, he organized an exhibit showcasing her paintings and those of two other fellow artists, Jo Cantine and Jean Paul Slusser. Her painting Melancholia was featured in a review in the New York Times, which noted the influence of the esthetic ideas of the Pre-Raphaelite school on her work. Tait's The Bride was selected for the First Annual Exhibition of American Paintings and Sculpture at the Art Institute of Chicago (October 25-December 16, 1928) and reproduced in the Chicago Evening Post with the caption "a picture accorded much popular admiration in the recent American show at the Art Institute". Encouraged by her success, she undertook additional studies and enrolled in a sketch class at the Whitney Studio. In Summer 1928, she gained representation from Cooperstown Art Association for their first exhibition. Commissions for her work, including a print for a United Fruit Company executive, allowed her to travel to Europe, Jamaica, and Haiti.

The Great Depression crashed the art market, which led Ferargil Gallery to request Agnes Tait to paint portraits of widely known public figures in hopes to glean buyers. She received critical praise for her work on these and other portraits, though the art market would not recover for years to come. In 1933, Tait took a third trip to Europe, this time with her new husband, William McNulty, a recently unemployed writer. Upon returning to the United States, she joined the Public Works of Art Project (PWAP), which commissioned drawings representing the "American Scene" for federal facilities. Grateful for this opportunity, she began working on her most famous piece, Skating in Central Park, a painting that combined stylistic elements inspired from American Primitive Art merged with influences drawn from Pieter Breughel the Elder's artistic universe. The work's success led to further employment under the Federal Art Project, including small lithographic editions and mural work. Her mural Fruits of the Land (1941) is located in the post office in Laurinburg, North Carolina. Tait's fondness for travel and adventure led her on a trip to Trinidad and Dominica, which she documented in a series of lithographs. One of the prints originating from this body of work, Trinidad Singers and Dominique, was exhibited in a women's artists group show in New York's Argent Galleries (January 1940) and was featured in a review of the show in the Art Digest.

Tait illustrated three children's books, Peter & Penny of the Island, Heide and Paco's Miracle.

== New Mexico ==
Her husband's declining health prompted the couple to relocate to Santa Fe, New Mexico in 1941, where Agnes discovered the Fine Arts Museum and added Southwestern landscape painting to her repertoire. In 1943, Tait's lithograph El Cristo Rey was chosen for the First National Exhibition of Prints at the Library of Congress. Her lithograph Survivors was also selected for the print exhibition "America in the War, the Artists for Victory." Motivated by these successes, she arranged one-woman shows in New York and Santa Fe. In 1945, the Fine Art Museum of New Mexico organized an exhibition of Tait's work, which travelled to several southwestern cities. During this time, her sister and husband developed health complications that preoccupied Tait, who found solace in painting cats. Despite the hardships, she continued to take commissions for portraits and murals, and after 22 years in Santa Fe Tait set out to find a new home. This was in part a result of her disappointment in being relegated to the status of "New Mexico Artist". Tait once said "If people want to think of me as a Santa Fe artist, well--let them think anything they want." After spending time in Italy, Ireland, and Florida, she returned to Santa Fe to live out the rest of her life until her death in 1981.

== Public Collections ==
- Library of Congress
- Metropolitan Museum of Art
- New York Public Library
