= Alan Gourley =

South African-British painter

Alan Stenhouse Gourley
- Born: 13 April 1909; Ayr, Scotland
- Died: 9 September 1991 (aged 82); Bromley, England
- Occupation: Painter

Alan Stenhouse Gourley (13 April 1909 – 9 September 1991) was a South African-British painter and stained glass artist.

He attended the Glasgow School of Art in 1928 and the Edinburgh College of Art between 1929 and 1931. He moved to South Africa where he created stained glass windows for cathedrals in Pretoria and Johannesburg and taught at Johannesburg Technical College between 1932 and 1937. He then moved to Paris where he studied at the École des Beaux-Arts between 1938 and 1940 and was instructor in camouflage during the Second World War. A carpet designed by him is located at South Africa House.

His work was part of the painting event in the art competition at the 1936 Summer Olympics representing South Africa.
