= György Kornis =

Hungarian painter

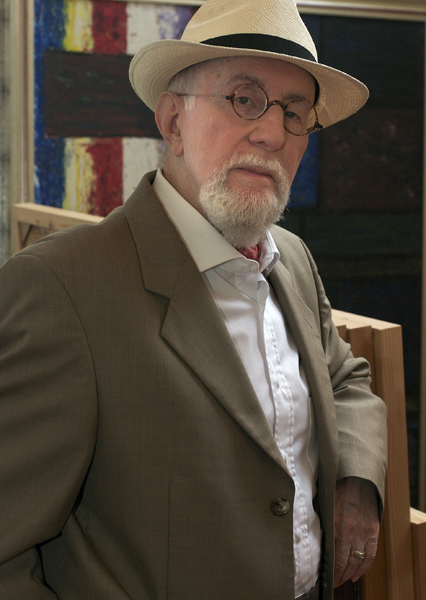
- Born: 26 February 1927; Miskolc, Hungary
- Died: 27 March 2011 (aged 84); Budapest, Hungary
- Education: École des Beaux-Arts
- Known for: Painting
- Movement: Abstract surrealism
- Awards: Merit Award of Hungary

György Kornis (February 26, 1927 in Miskolc – March 27, 2011 in Budapest) was a Hungarian painter. He studied in École des Beaux-Arts. His artistic style is Abstract Surrealism, influenced by Henri Matisse and Pablo Picasso. From 1980 to 1990 he lived in Vienna and later in Budapest. He began his career as a stage designer at the Paris Opera.

== Career ==
- 1946–1949 - stage designer of Paris Opera
- 1952 - he returned to Budapest
- From 1957 - member of the Studio for Young Artists (Fiatal Művészek Stúdiója )
- 1988–2002 - lives and works in Vienna
- Since 1994 - member of European Academy of Sciences and Arts
- 1997 - received a Merit Award of Hungary (Magyar Köztársasági Érdemrend)
- 2002 - he returned to Budapest

== Important exhibitions ==
- 1970 Sammlung Dieter, Frankfurt
- 1973 Collegium Hungaricum, Vienna
- 1974 Botsom Gallery, London
- 1976 Galerie Bernard, Paris
- 1983 Mednyánszky Terem, Budapest
- 1987 Miskolci Galéria
- 1988 Galerie De Pélichy, Brussels
- 1989 1991, 1992 Galerie Sanner, Darmstadt
- 1989 ASL Galerie, Ghent
- 1993 Hotel Kempinsky, Budapest
- 1995 Árkád Galéria, Budapest
- 1997 Embassy of Hungarian Republic, Vienna
- 2003 Vigadó Galéria, Budapest
- 2004 Berlin
- 2007 Hamilton Aulich Art Galéria, Budapest
- 2007 Ernst Múzeum, Budapest

== His artworks can be seen in the following museums ==
- Albertina museum of Vienna
- Fondation Jaques Brel, Brussels
- Hungarian National Gallery, Budapest
- Musée du Louvre, Paris
- Modern Hungarian Gallery, Pécs
- Museum of Christian Arts, Esztergom
- Museum of Modern Art Passau
- Museum Moderner Kunst, Ludwig Stiftung, Vienna
- Menton's Modern Art Museum
- Műterem Galéria (Buda Castle)
- T-Art Foundation, Budapest
