= Lina Jaunez =

French painter and art critic (1798 – 1865)

- Born: 5 November 1798; Paris, French
- Died: 28 June 1865 (aged 66); Paris
- Occupations: painter, art critic, design teacher
- Notable work: Painting of the ruins of the Church of Saint-Thomas-du-Louvre and the Hôtel de Longueville.

Lina Jaunez (5 November 1798 – 28 June 1865) was a French painter, art critic and design teacher.

== Life ==
She was an instructor of painting and drawing at The École des Beaux-Arts, where she taught exclusively to women.

Her most significant work is an instructional book titled Anatomie appliquée aux arts (Anatomy Applied to the Arts).

== Gallery ==
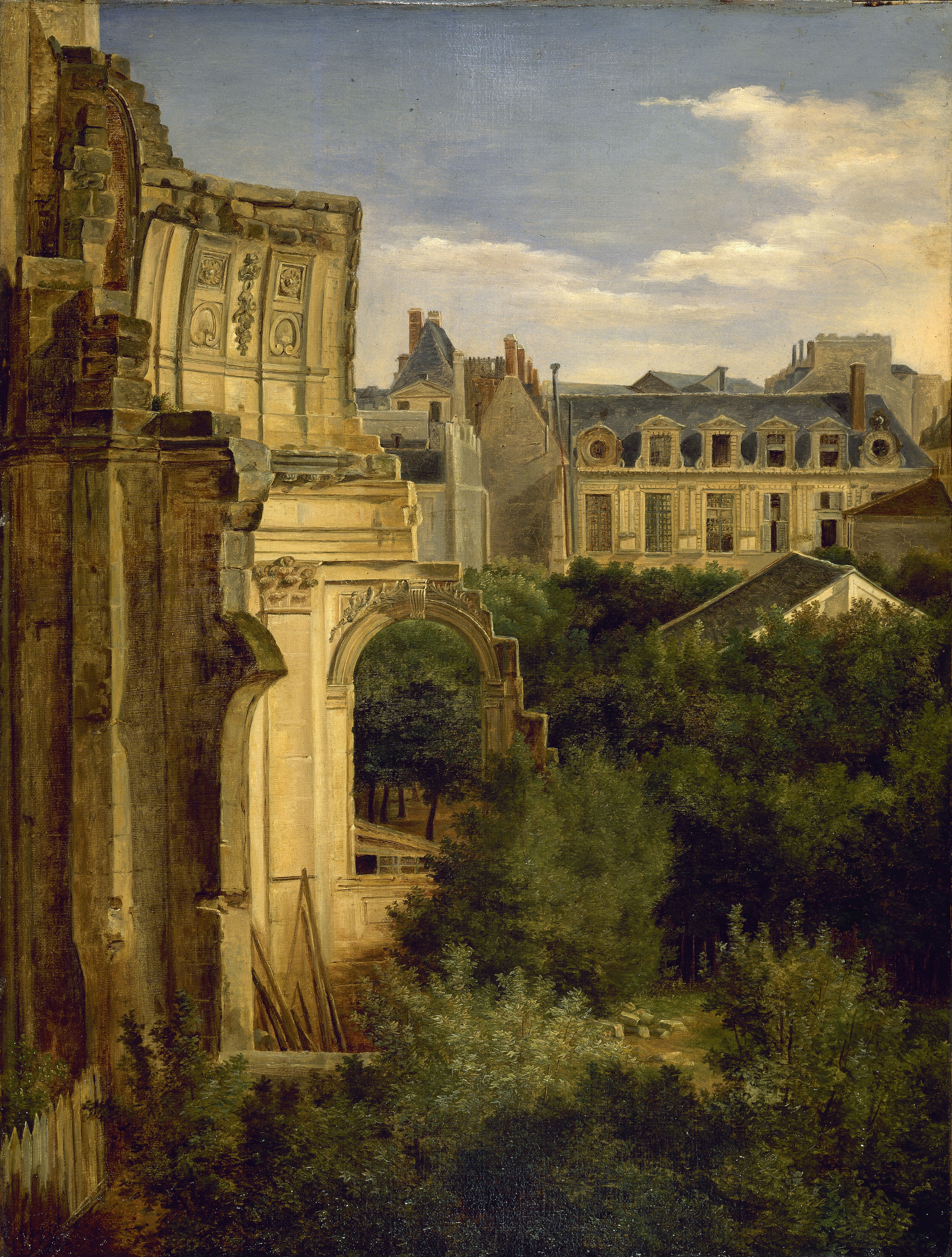
View of the ruins of Saint-Thomas-du-Louvre and the Hôtel Longueville, Salon of 1833, Musée Carnavalet

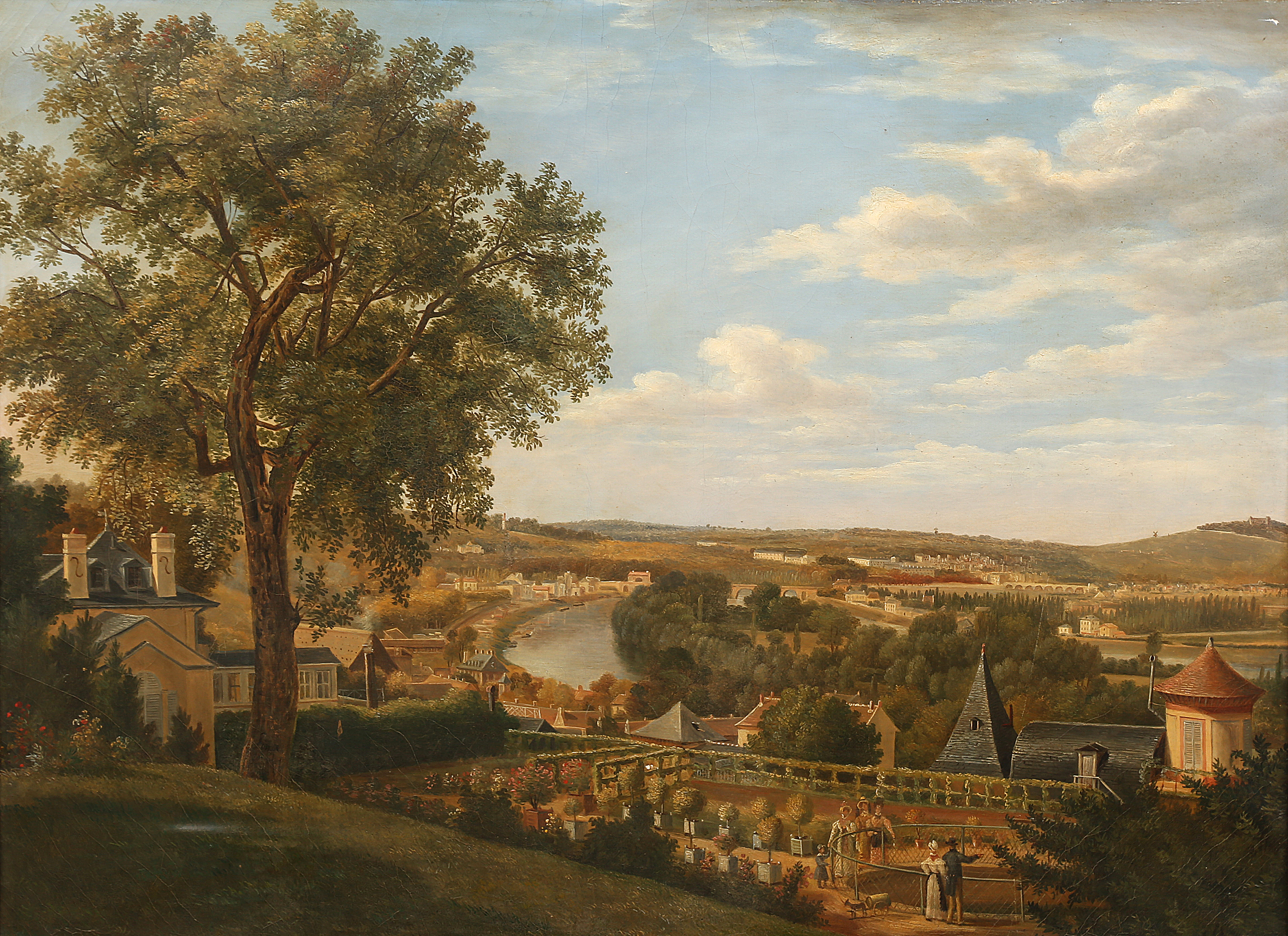
View taken at Montalais, near Sèvres, 1834.
