= Pierre Farel =

French painter (born 1957)

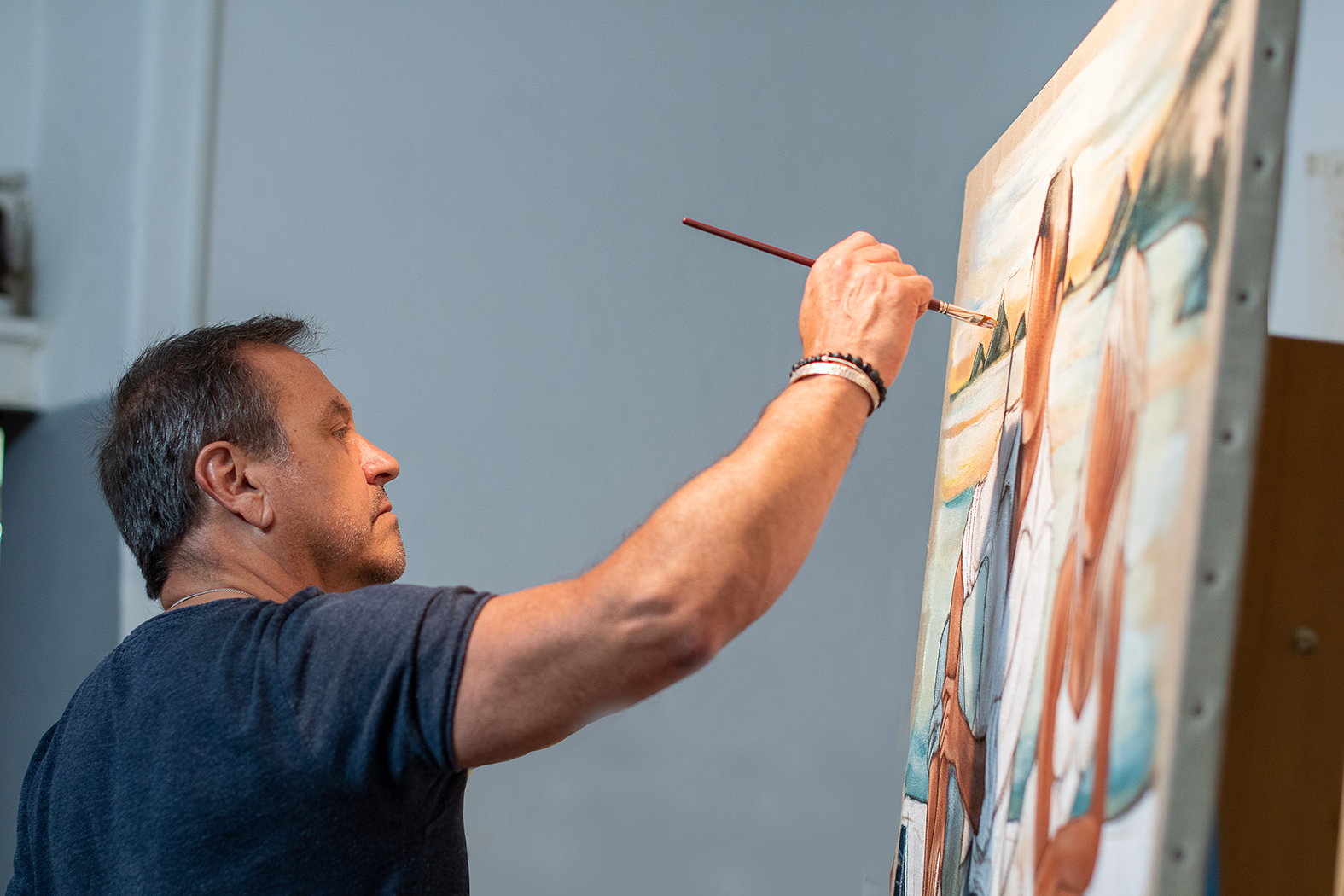
- Born: April 15, 1957 (age 69); Orange, France
- Education: Fine Arts School in Avignon
- Known for: Painter and artist
- Website: http://www.pierre-farel.com/en

Pierre Farel (born 1957) is a French painter and artist.

== Early life and education ==
Pierre was born in Orange, southern France in 1957. He graduated from the Ecole des Beaux-Arts in Avignon. When he was 20, he moved to Corsica.

== Career ==
Farel has been an artist and creator since 1987 and has operated his studio workshop in Ajaccio, which was established in 1988. His first exhibition took place in 1989, when Pierre Cardin gave him a place in Espace Cardin. After that, he displayed his work in several galleries. During an exhibition in New York in 2001, he met Richard Elmir, the Director of Medici Gallery in Paris, who asked him to join the artists of his gallery. Since 2002, he has been exhibiting his work at the Place des Vosges every year.

== Work ==
Farel has created over 2000 paintings, along with lithographs and sculptures. His work has been featured in magazines such as Univers des Arts, Corse Matin Presse, Artistes Magazine, Femina, Public Sénat, 3 Corse Viastella, and Select Magazine.

Jean Louis Avril in Univers des arts, said "Over the course of numerous events and exhibitions both in France and around the world, the theme of his works takes the form of his favorite creed: Women, women, women." Farel's paintings depict sensual characters with refined forms that are set in fashionable bars grooving to the sound of dance and music, while Corsica stays his main source of inspiration. In 2018, he celebrated 30 years of painting at the Château de la Buzine in Marseille, Galerie de Médicis in Paris, Casino de soiree in Ajaccio and Manoir de la Roseraie in Grignan, where he was invited to exhibit in residence.

During the COVID-19 lockdown, Farel created Merci, which is a part of the travelling exhibition in Portugal, bringing together many selected artists. This painting has been offered to the staff of 3 hospitals in Ajaccio as a token of gratitude. It was also made the cover of Univers des Arts, a magazine, as a part of its special summer edition in 2020.

== Exhibitions ==
- 1988 - Paris - Palais de Chaillot Young French Painting for the city of Ajaccio – Foundation Reader's digest France
- 1995 - Contemporary Art Fair Quai Henri IV - Contemporary Art Fair Place de la Bastille
- 1998 - Beijing China Art Fair - La Rochelle Salon Art Atlantic - - Contemporary Art Fair Place de la Bastille
- 2000 - Berlin Contemporary Art Fair Schlossplatz - Paris Salle Wagram Contemporary Art Fair MIA
- 2001 - New-York Art Expo - Hong-Kong Art Fair in May and November
- 2004 - Great Britain – London - UK London Art Fair
- 2013 - Lebanon – Beirut – The Francophonie Art Fair
