= Pierre Carron =

French sculptor and painter (1932–2022)

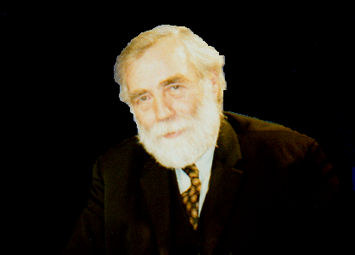
- Portrait of Pierre Carron, 1995
- Born: 16 December 1932; Fécamp, Normandy, France
- Died: 19 March 2022 (aged 89)
- Occupations: Sculptor and painter

Pierre Carron (16 December 1932 – 19 March 2022) was a French sculptor and painter, especially known for his portrayals of children and natural landscapes.

== Biography ==
Born in Fécamp, Normandy, France, he primarily studied drawing at the École Régionale des Beaux-Arts in Le Havre. Because of the German occupation, he was, for a time, the only student at the school. Later, he attended the École nationale supérieure des arts décoratifs, then, in 1951, he entered the École des Beaux-Arts in Paris, France, for 4 years, to study and work under the mentorship of Raymond Legueult.

In 1957, he received the Prix de la critique and, in 1960, the Grand Prix de Rome. From 1961 to 1964 he took up residence in the Villa Medici, France, where he met Balthus, director of the establishment at the time. They developed a deep friendship that Carron would celebrate in many of his works. He became a professor at the École des Beaux-Arts in 1967, a post he held for thirty years. He was the last professor at the school to teach exclusively in a figurative, realist, style of painting. In 1991, he was elected to the Académie des Beaux-Arts, to the chair previously occupied by Félix Labisse, and in 2002 was made President of the Académie, as well as serving as vice-president in 2018 under Patrick de Carolis.

Aside from his paintings, Carron's major works also include the stained glass windows in the Orléans Cathedral and a double triptych for the Saint-Etienne Cathedral in Meaux.

Carron died on 19 March 2022 at the age of 89.
