= Harold Perry Erskine =

American architect and sculptor

- Born: June 5, 1879; Racine, Wisconsin, US
- Died: June 5, 1951 (aged 72); Manhattan, New York, US
- Education: Williams College; Columbia University; École des Beaux-Arts
- Known for: Realist figural sculptures

Harry "Hal" Perry Erskine (June 5, 1879 – January 5, 1951) was an American sculptor and architect. He was known for his garden features and realist figural sculptures.

== Early life ==
Erskine was born in Racine, Wisconsin on June 5, 1879. His parents were Emma Payne and Charles E. Eskine, treasurer of the J. I. Case Plow Works in Racine. In 1892, Erskine and his father explored western North Carolina on horseback to find property for the family's summer home. They purchased a property near Tryon, North Carolina.

Erskine attended Phillips Academy in Andover, Massachusetts. He attended Williams College, graduating with a B.A. in 1902. While at Williams, he joined the fraternity of Delta Psi (St. Anthony Hall). After college, Erskine worked for the J. I Case Plow Works in Racine.

He then studied architecture at Columbia University, followed by four years studying at the École des Beaux-Arts in Paris, France. He also studied architecture in Greece and Italy.

== Career ==
=== Architecture ===
Erskine was a partner in the architectural firm Erskine & Blagden, later Hazzard, Erskine & Blagdon, in New York City. His practice focused on industrial and mercantile building. His firm designed Lord & Taylor on Fifth Avenue in Manhattan, New York. In 1908, he designed the Congregational Church in Tryon, North Carolina.

After World War I, Erskine resigned from the architectural practice. In 1927, he designed Lynncote Lodge, a Tudor Revival style lodge on his family's property in Tryon, now listed on the National Register of Historic Places.

=== Military ===
Erskine was a lieutenant, captain, and major of infantry in the Thirty-third Division during World War I. He graduated from the General Staff School in France in 1918. He received a Silver Star in 1918.

=== Art ===
After World War I, Erskine focused on sculpting and art. He designed numerous fountains, garden sculptures, memorials, and portraits. For sculptures, he preferred working in soapstone, including the works "Cloud Goddess", "The Eve", "The Mowgli", and "Nephele". He was known for his realist figural sculptures. In November 1925, Erskine had a solo show at the Feragil Galleries in New York City.

In 1937, Erskine won the competition to design a decorative panel for the Dry Dock Savinings Bank on Lexington Avenue and 59th Street in New York City. Erskine developed a technique for coloring stone, used for the relief. He also created the Wilton Merle-Smith Memorial for the Central Presbyterian Church in Manhattan and the Walter Travis memorial at the Garden City Golf Club. His bust of Carl Akeley is in the collection of the American Museum of Natural History.

== Personal life ==
On January 17, 1914, Erskine married Coralie Coudert, a New York City and Newport socialite who had been married twice before. She was the daughter of Louis Leonce Coudert, an attorney with Coudert Brothers. She had the reputation as "the best dressed woman in the world". She divorced Erskine in Paris in 1922 and died in 1935.

Erskine was a member of the Beaux Arts Society and the St. Anthony Club of New York. He was a sportsman who hunted in Kenya in 1910 and 1911, and donated big game trophy mounts to the American Museum of Natural History. He lived at the Century Club in New York City and at Lynncote, his family's summer estate in Tryon, North Carolina.

Erskine died after a long illness at Lenox Hill Hospital in Manhattan, New York, on January 5, 1951, at the age of 72 years. He was buried in Tryon.
