= Christos Tzivelos =

Greek visual artist (1949 –1995)

- Born: 1949
- Died: 1995 (aged 45–46)
- Education: Athens Technological Organization (Doxiadis School); École des Beaux-Arts; École Nationale Supérieure d'Architecture de Paris-Belleville
- Style: Light art

Christos Tzivelos (Greek: Χρήστος Τζίβελος; 1949–1995) was a Greek artist. He was primarily active in the 1980s and first half of the 1990s.

== Education ==
He graduated from the Athens Technological Organization (Doxiadis School) in 1972 and moved to Paris, where he studied at the École des Beaux-Arts from 1972 to 1976 and at the École Nationale Supérieure d'Architecture de Paris-Belleville from 1976 to 1990. He worked as an assistant to Costas Tsoclis and later to the sculptor Takis, participating in the construction of installations in Paris.

== Work ==
Tzivelos' early works included in situ three-dimensional autoluminous installations and experiments with painting on glass. His first solo exhibition in Athens was in 1986 and he had his first solo exhibition in Paris at the Caisse des Dépôts et Consignations in 1989. Tzivelos' work has been featured in various exhibitions, including the Macedonian Museum of Contemporary Art and the Benaki Museum.

In 2018, a retrospective exhibition of his work titled, Modeling Phenomena, was held at the Benaki Museum Annexe in Athens. The show focused on Tzivelos' light work from 1977 to 1995, that have been described as "poetic and highly meditative" and influenced by his interest in "Greek mythology, philosophy, alchemy and cosmology."

Tzivelos also created works using projected light that were grounded in the notion of "coinciding opposites" as proposed by Heraclitus such as presence/absence, light/dark and beginning/end. These ideas also informed his works "Light-Fossils", round-shaped drawings which were exhibited in his final solo show in 1993.

He died in 1995.

== Collections ==
His work is held in the permanent collection of the Macedonian Museum of Contemporary Art, among others.
