= Lynncote =

Historic house in North Carolina, United States

- U.S. National Register of Historic Places
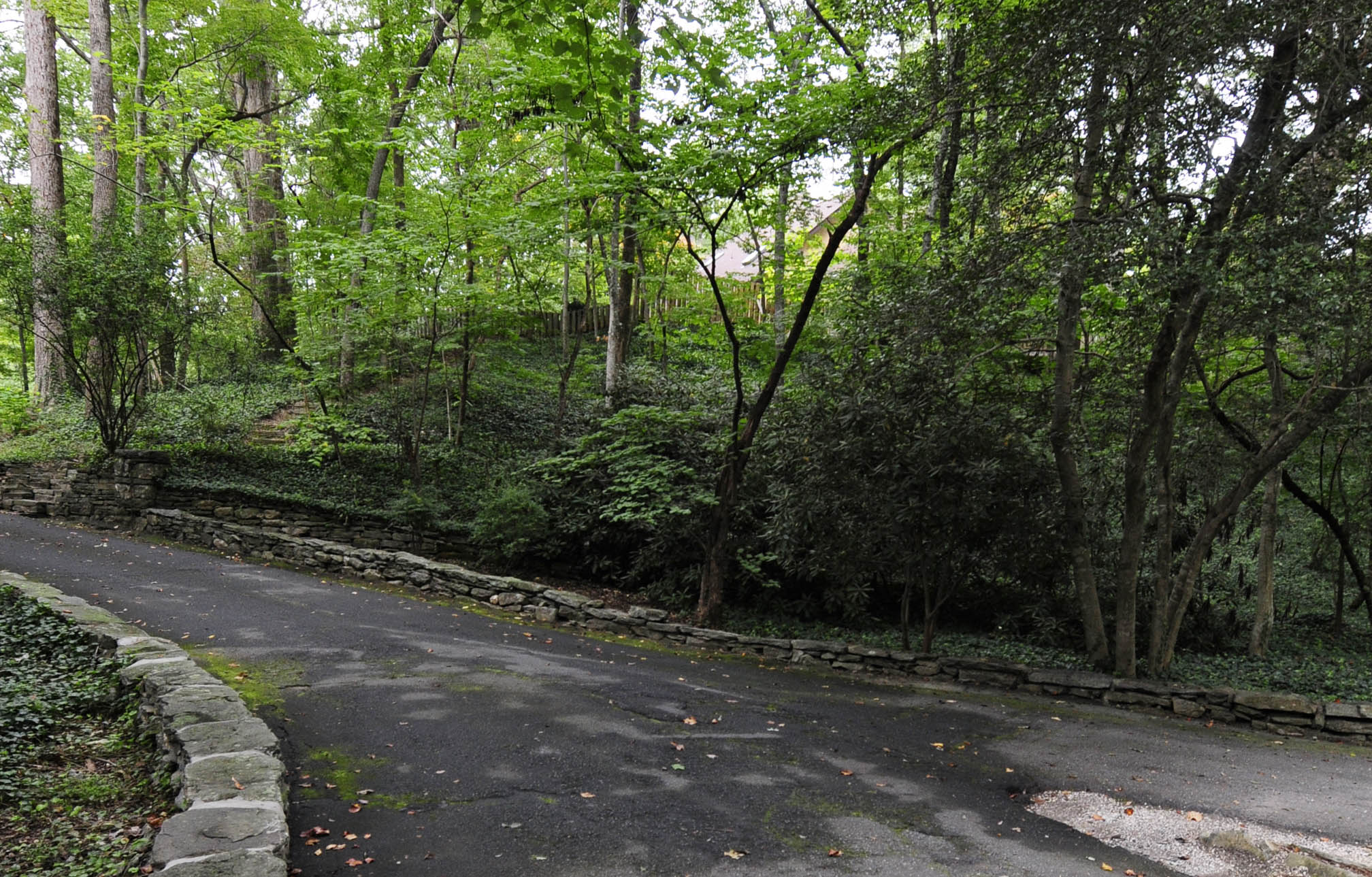
- Lynncote landscape, September 2012

- Location within North Carolina Location within the United States
- Location: 3318 Lynn Rd., near Tryon, North Carolina
- Coordinates: 35°13′24.6″N 82°14′38.7″W
- Area: 20.6 acres (8.3 ha)
- Built: 1927-1928
- Built by: Gaines, Wright J.; Arthur, Frank
- Architect: Stillwell, Erle G.; Erskine, Harold Perry
- Architectural style: Tudor Revival
- NRHP reference No.: 10000604
- Added to NRHP: August 30, 2010

Lynncote is a historic estate located near Tryon, North Carolina. It was designed by architect Erle G. Stillwell and built in 1927–1928. It is a two-story, eight-bay, Tudor Revival style stone dwelling built on the foundation of a previous dwelling built in 1895 and burned in 1916. It features an off-center entrance pavilion, leaded-glass casement windows, and half-timbering. Other contributing resources are the estate landscape, workshop (c. 1910, c. 1928), and Lynncote Lodge (1925-1926), designed by Harold Perry Erskine.

It was added to the National Register of Historic Places in 2010.
