= Georges Zipélius =

French illustrator

- Born: 1808
- Died: 1890 (aged 81–82)
- Education: École nationale supérieure des Beaux-Arts
- Known for: Illustration

Georges Zipélius (1808–1890) was a French illustrator who designed wallpaper. His work is preserved in the collection of the Cooper-Hewitt, National Design Museum and the Deutsches Tapetenmuseum. The wallpaper El Dorado, in the collection of the Cooper-Hewitt, was co-designed by Zipélius with Eugène Ehrmann and Joseph Fuchs; it took them two years to design it; it is still in print today. Zipélius was from Mulhouse and attended the L'Ecole des Beaux Arts.
