= Joseph Margulies (artist) =

American painter

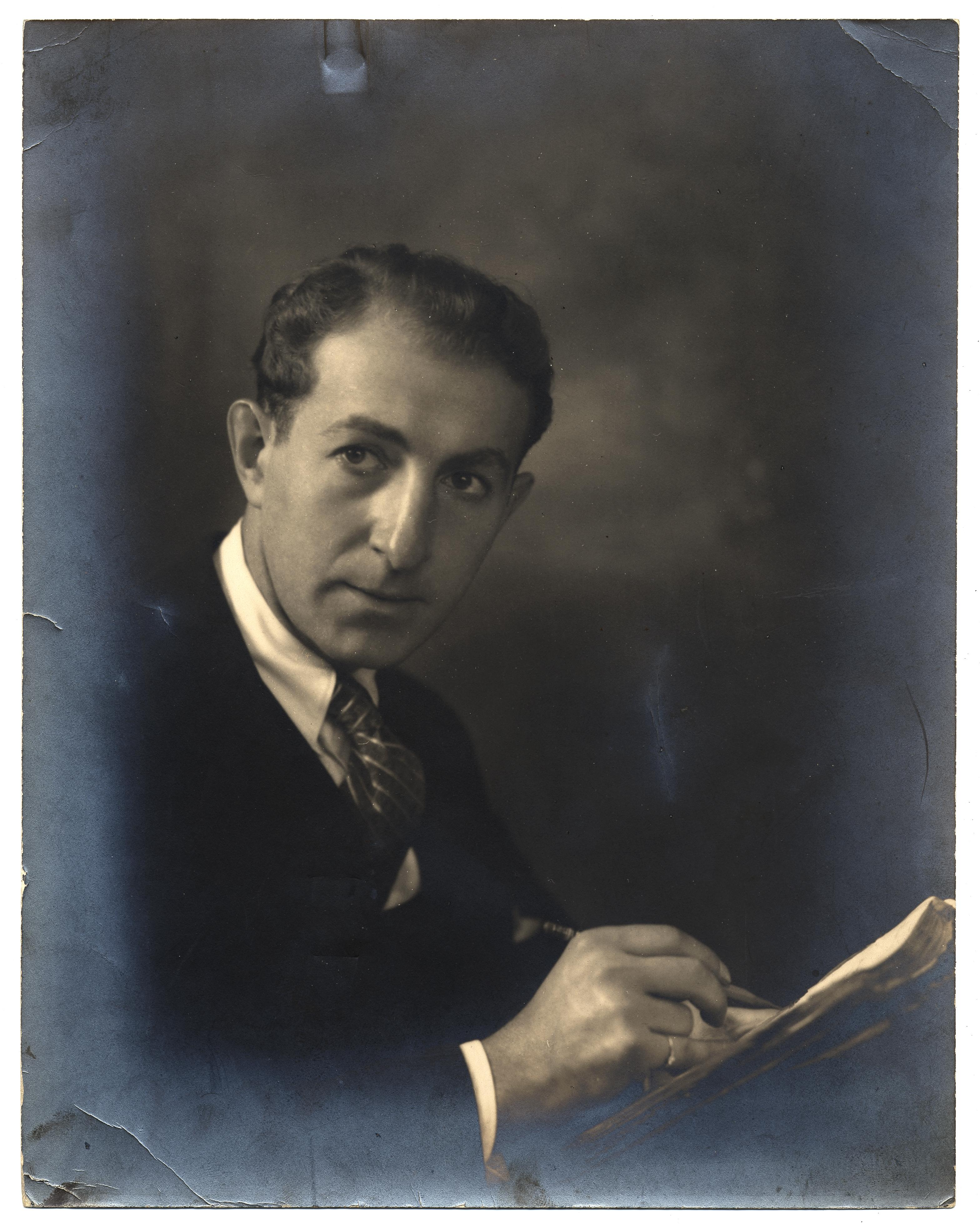
- Margulies, c. 1920
- Born: 1896; Vienna
- Died: 1984 (aged 87–88)

Signature
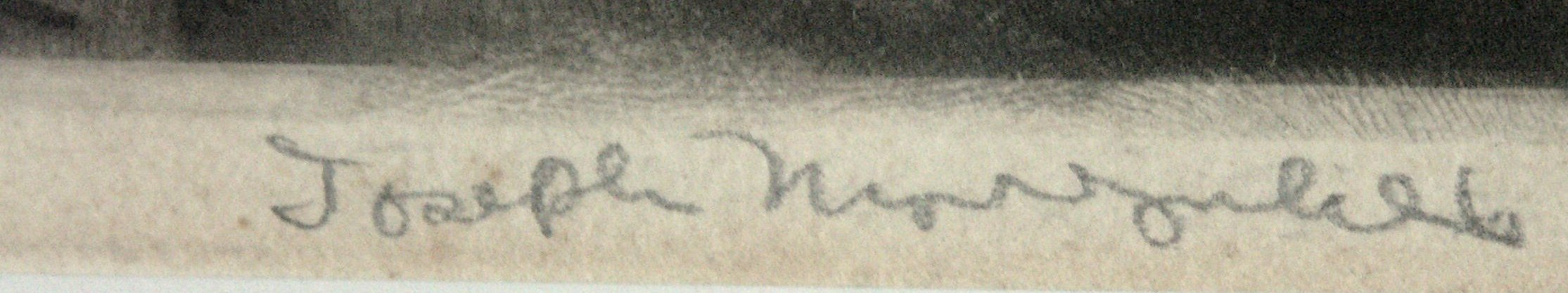

Joseph Margulies (1896–1984) was a Vienna-born American painter and printmaker.

== Biography ==
Gloucester Fisherman, oil on canvas painting by Joseph Margulies, private collection

Joseph Margulies was born in Vienna, Austria in 1896. He immigrated to the United States at an early age. Margulies studied at the Art Students League of New York with the printmaker Joseph Pennell (1857–1926), from 1922 to 1925. Margulies then continued his studies at the National Academy of Design, Cooper Union in New York City, and at the École des Beaux-Arts in Paris. He also apprenticed with Maynard Waltner in Vienna. He provided illustrations for Max Eastman's American radical magazine "The Masses". Margulies died in 1984.

== Works ==
Margulies is best known for his portrait prints and seascapes of the New England coast, as typified by Gloucester Fisherman. The Butler Institute of American Art (Youngstown, Ohio), the Library of Congress, the Metropolitan Museum of Art, the National Portrait Gallery (Washington D. C.) and Yale University Art Gallery are among the public collections holding work by Joseph Margulies.
