= Morton Traylor =

American artist (1918–1996)

Morton Patrick Traylor (April 6, 1918 – April 28, 1996) was an American fine artist, designer, serigrapher and founder of the Virginia Art Institute in Charlottesville, Virginia.

== Biography ==
Morton Traylor was born on April 6, 1918, in Petersburg, Virginia. Traylor lived in Los Angeles most of his life. After graduating from Eagle Rock High School, he entered Los Angeles City College, where his formal art training began.

Around 1960, he moved to White Hall. In the mid-1960s, he established the Virginia Art Institute in Charlottesville, Virginia. The school was in operation for about ten years.

Traylor married Maxine. Around 1986, he moved with his wife back west. Traylor died on April 28, 1996, aged 78, in Roseburg, Oregon.

Traylor was a painter and serigraph printmaker. His artwork can be found in museums and private collections around the world including the Georgia Museum of Art and The British Museum.

== Professional life ==
- National Features Syndicate, New York, New York
- McNaught Syndicate, St. Louis, Missouri.
- Whitman Publishing Co. (Dell Comics) Beverley Hills, California
- Northrop Aviation Co. Commercial Art Dept., Hawthorne, California
- Art Director, "TRYOUT", Big Bear Lake, California
- Owned and Operated Advertising Co., San Bernardino, California
- President of Inter-Mountain Concert Society, California
- Director of Lex Advertising Co., Charlottesville, Virginia
- Owned and Operated Virginia Art & Advertising, Crozet, Virginia
- Founder/Director of Virginia Art Institute, Charlottesville, Virginia

== Awards and honors ==
- President of Kappa Tau Sigma, Honorary Art Society (1939)
- LACC Summer Scholarship to Chouinard Art Institute through Latham Contest (1939)
- Annual Scholarship to Chouinard through National competition (1940)
- Graduated from LACC as one of six Honor Students Continuing Scholarship to Chouinard Art Institute (1941)
- First Prize (Drawing) 3rd National Veterans' Exhibition, Long Beach, California (1949)
- First Prize (Drawing) 5th Annual, Alley Gallery, Charlottesville, Virginia (1964)
- First Prize (Print) Contemporary Southern Art Festival, Charlottesville, Virginia (1964)
- Hon. Mention, Southern Art Festival, Atlanta Georgia (1964)

== National and group exhibitions ==
- Municipal Art Commission, City Han, Los Angeles, California (1946)
- Solon de L'Art Libre, Modern Museum of Art, Paris, France (1947)
- First Annual Veterans' Exhibition, L. A. Museum of Art, Los Angeles, California (1946)
- City Show at Greek Theatre, Los Angeles, California. (1946–47)
- National Orange Show, San Bernardino, California (1949–50)
- Los Angeles Art Association, Los Angeles, California (1949–51)
- Print Club, Albany, New York National Serigraph Society, New York City, N. Y. (1949)
- Oakland Art Gallery, Oakland, California San Francisco Museum of Art, California (1949)
- Arizona State Fair, Phoenix Arizona Modern Institute of Art, Beverly Hills, California (1949)
- First Annual Exhibition, Santa Paula, California (1949)
- Los Angeles Annual, County Museum, Los Angeles, California (1950–55)
- Los Angeles County Fair, Pomona, California (1950)
- Western Drawing Institute Show, Jepson's Gallery, Los Angeles, California (1950–51)
- Pennell Exhibition, Library of Congress, Washington, D. C. (1950)
- Laguna National Print Exhibition, Laguna Beach, California (1950)
- California State Fair, Sacramento, California (1949–50)
- Landau Gallery Group Show, LaCieniga Blvd., Los Angeles, California (1951)

== Publications ==
- Newspaper "Paris Montparnasse" Paris, France (1947)
- Art News Magazine, December (1950)
- Newspaper "Times" Los Angeles, California (1949)
- "Sacramento Bee" Sacramento, California (1954)
- Les Archives Historiques D'Art Contemporain De La Biennale De Venise (1954)
- Prints of California Artists, Crest of Hollywood, California (1954)
- The News-Review Roseburg, Oregon (1986)
