= Villa Arson =

Art school and museum in Nice, France

la Villa Arson
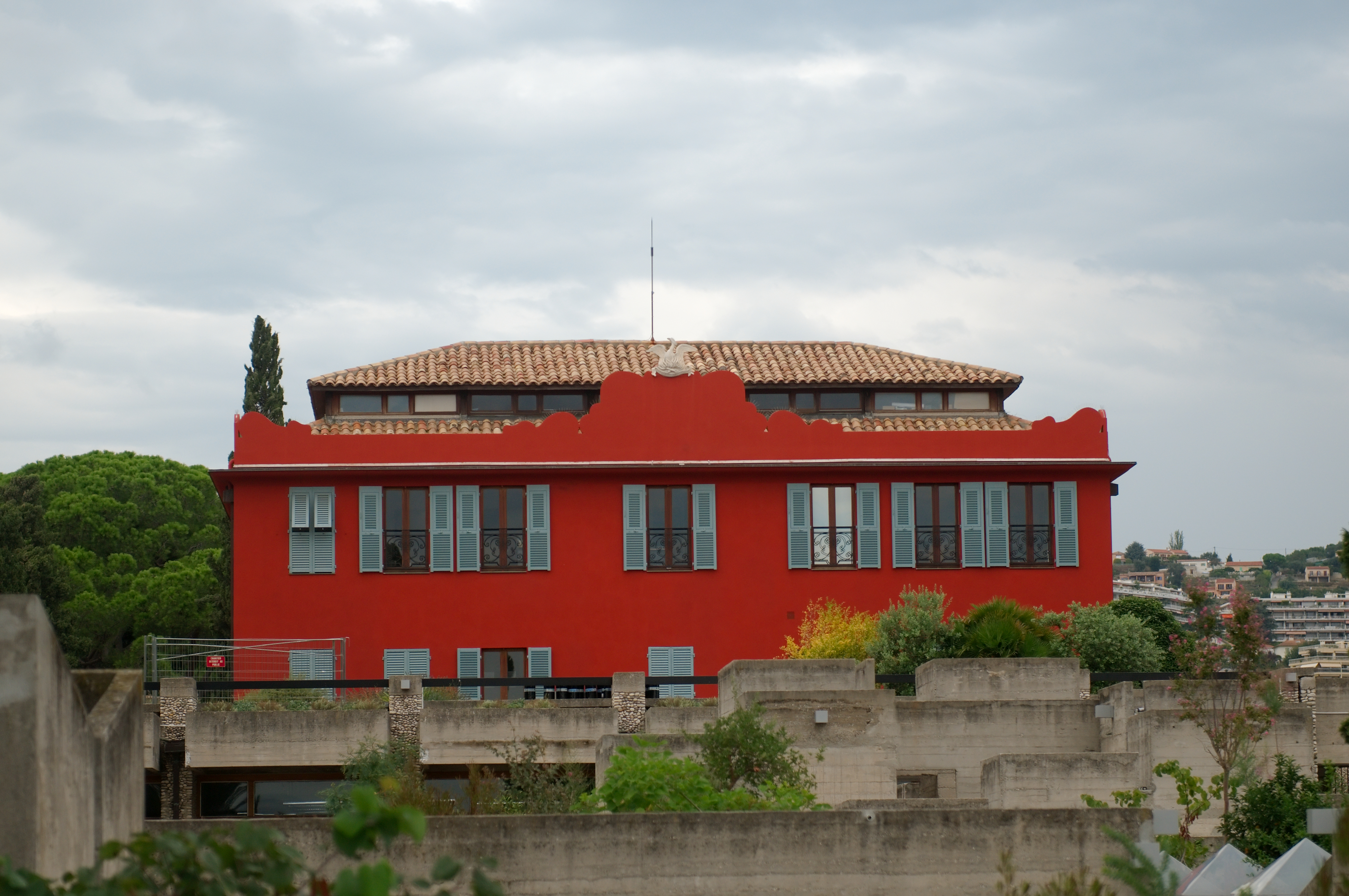
- Type: grand établissement
- Established: 1881 (1972 as la Villa Arson)
- Location: Nice, France; 43.721°N 7.253°E
- Website: www.villa-arson.org

The Villa Arson, also referred to as the École Nationale Supérieure d'Arts à la Villa Arson (National School of Fine Arts at the Villa Arson), is a French art museum, elite school and research institution for contemporary art, located in Nice, France. It is home to the École Nationale Supérieure d'Arts de Nice (National School of Fine Arts of Nice) and the Centre Nationale d'Art Contemporain (National Centre for Contemporary Art), and was created under a ministerial charter in 1972 by the Ministry of Culture.

== History ==
La Villa Arson was founded in 1881 as the École Nationale des Arts Décoratifs. It retained the name for 89 years, until it was changed to the École Nationale Supérieure d'Arts de Nice in 1970. In 1965, the city of Nice offered the former home of the Arson family to the school; and an expansion of the two acre property to create an international fine art school, designed by Michel Marot, is completed in 1970. The Centre Nationale d'Art Contemporain was established in 1971, and the École and the Centre were officially inaugurated under the name "la Villa Arson" in 1972 by then Minister of Cultural Affairs, Jacques Duhamel. In 1981, la Villa Arson celebrated its centenary; and in 2002, only 30 years after its inauguration, it is designated a grands établissement for contemporary art by the Ministry of Culture.

== Location ==
La Villa Arson is located on a hill in the neighbourhood of Saint Barthélemy, in the northern district of the city of Nice, and occupies a vast area of 23,000 m^{2}. The site overlooks the city and the coastline of the French Riviera and is designed to emphasis its view, as-well-as vegetation and natural light, with the wide use of courtyards, terraces and gardens.

== See also ==
- Grandes écoles
- Grands établissements
- Education in France
