= André Minangoy =

French architect

- Born: March 9, 1904; Paris, France
- Died: March 2, 1985 (aged 80); Nice, France
- Occupation: Architect
- Website: pss-archi.eu/architecte/1793

André Minangoy (1904-1985) was a French architect. He was particularly active in the Alpes-Maritimes region, taking advantage of the "Trente Glorieuses" boom that hit the Côte d'Azur. His most famous work is Marina Baie des Anges, in Villeneuve-Loubet and a twin ("Sonnenring") is located in Frankfurt, Germany, built by Gunther Balser. Minangoy's architectural styles were modern architecture and style néo-provençal.

== Life ==
After the Liberation of France, Minangoy lived in Cannes and Vence. André Minangoy and Jean Marchand developed a close friendship. André Minangoy passed on his artistic and literary rights to Jean Marchand.

== Professional work ==
He carried out his professional work in architecture on the French Riviera. He was the architect of the "Domaine de Pierre Longue" in Cannes. Minangoy was an experienced architect and town planner in the 1960s, heading up a major architectural practice in Vence and then Cannes, where he was assisted by Michel Néron, an architect who had graduated from the École nationale supérieure des Beaux-Arts. André Minangoy was also close to Pierre Canto, the founder of one of the Côte d'Azur's first marina in Cannes, which already bore his name during his lifetime as Port Pierre-Canto.

=== Marina Baie des Anges ===
Marina Baie des Anges (English: Marina Bay of Angels) is a group of four pyramid-shaped buildings encircling the port containing 1300 apartments. In addition to the harbour master's office and staff accommodation, the facilities around the port include a row of shops, a swimming pool and a thalassotherapy centre. In 1959, the Alpes-Maritimes département was running a vast urbanisation policy. It is not clear, who had the idea of pyramid-shaped buildings encircling the port, either André Minangoy or perhaps Jean Marchand. According to Le Monde, the initial drawing was done by André Minangoy. It was built between 1969 and 1993.
