= Joseph Margulies (lawyer) =

American lawyer

Academic background
- Education: Cornell University (AB); Northwestern University (JD)

Academic work
- Discipline: Law
- Sub-discipline: Human rights law Criminal law Guantanamo litigation
- Institutions: Cornell University; MacArthur Justice Center

Joseph Margulies is an American attorney with the MacArthur Justice Center and a professor of law and government at Cornell University in Ithaca, New York.

== Education ==
Margulies earned a Bachelor of Arts degree from Cornell University and a Juris Doctor from the Northwestern University School of Law.

== Career ==
Margulies was lead counsel in Rasul v. Bush, the case in which the Supreme Court of the United States established prisoners at Guantanamo Bay detention camp are entitled to judicial review and the U.S. court system has the authority to decide whether non-U.S. citizens held in Guantanamo Bay were wrongfully imprisoned.

Margulies is the author of the book Guantánamo and the Abuse of Presidential Power and of What Changed When Everything Changed: 9/11 and the Making of National Identity.
