= Villeneuve-Loubet =

Commune in Provence-Alpes-Côte d'Azur, France

Villeneuve-Loubet Vilanuòva e Lo Lobet (Occitan)
- Commune
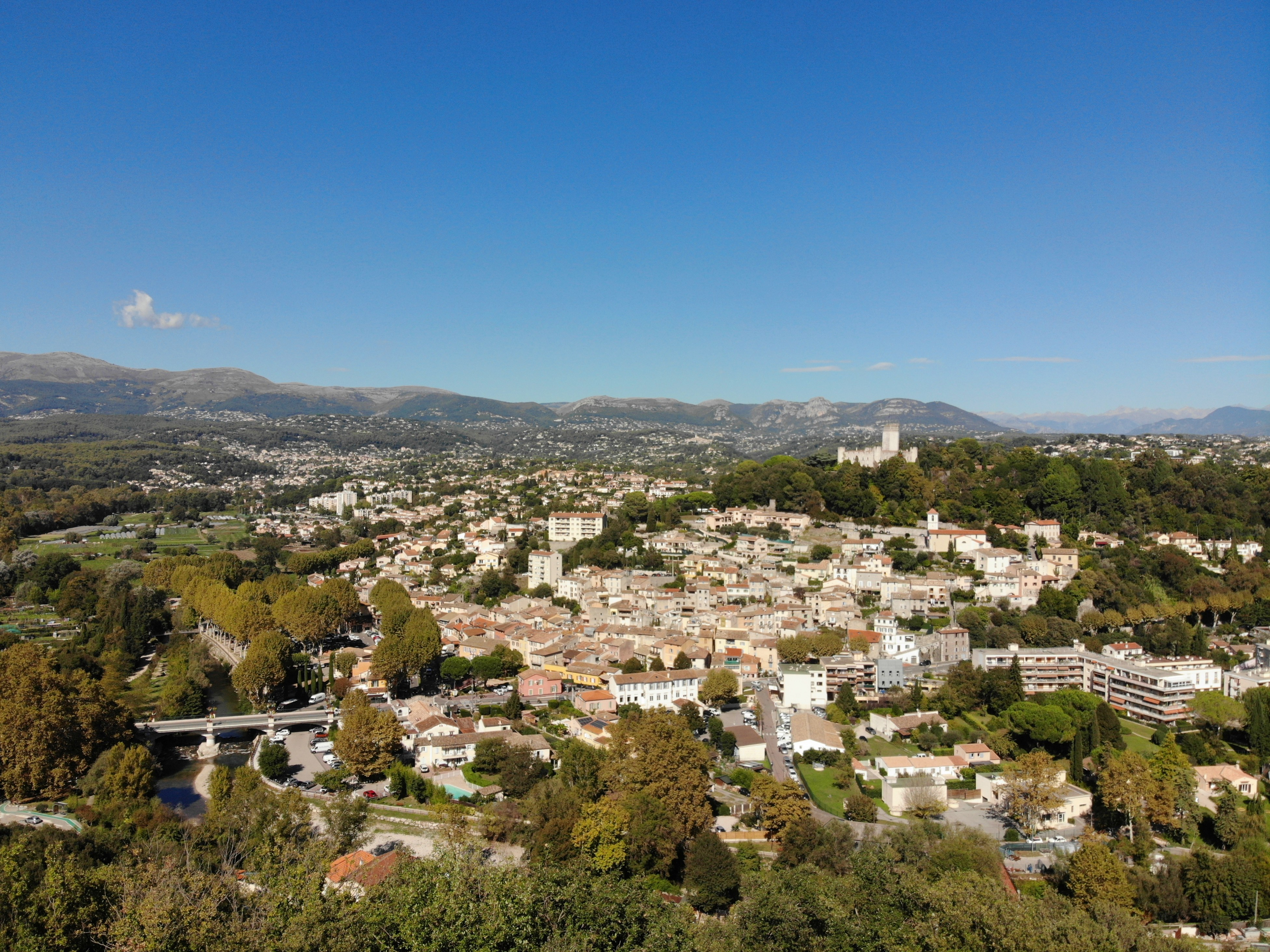
- The village overlooked by the Château de Villeneuve-Loubet

- Coat of arms
- Location of Villeneuve-Loubet
- Location within France Location within Provence-Alpes-Côte d'Azur
- Coordinates: 43°39′32″N 7°07′20″E
- Country: France
- Region: Provence-Alpes-Côte d'Azur
- Department: Alpes-Maritimes
- Arrondissement: Grasse
- Canton: Villeneuve-Loubet
- Intercommunality: CA Sophia Antipolis

Government
  - Mayor (2026–32): Lionnel Luca
- Area^{1}: 19.60 km^{2} (7.57 sq mi)
- Highest elevation: 213 m (699 ft)
- Lowest elevation: 0 m (0 ft)
- Population (2023): 17,548
  - Density: 895.3/km^{2} (2,319/sq mi)
- Demonym: Villeneuvois
- Time zone: UTC+01:00 (CET)
  - Summer (DST): UTC+02:00 (CEST)
- INSEE/Postal code: 06161 /06270
- Website: www.villeneuveloubet.fr
- ^{1} French Land Register data, which excludes lakes, ponds, glaciers > 1 km^{2} (0.386 sq mi or 247 acres) and river estuaries.

Villeneuve-Loubet (French pronunciation: [vilnœv lubɛ]; Occitan: Vilanuòva e Lo Lobet; Italian: Villanova Lobetto) is a commune in the Alpes-Maritimes department in the Provence-Alpes-Côte d'Azur region in Southeastern France. It lies between Cagnes-sur-Mer and Antibes, at the mouth of the river Loup, ten kilometres west of central Nice.

It was created by the joining two old villages: the old village of Villeneuve inland and the village of Loubet on the shore of the Mediterranean Sea. Its inhabitants are called Villeneuvois.

== Economy ==
Villeneuve-Loubet is at the same time a seaside resort and part of the technology cluster or technopole of nearby Sophia Antipolis. Many companies of the tertiary sector being installed in the city.

== Culture ==
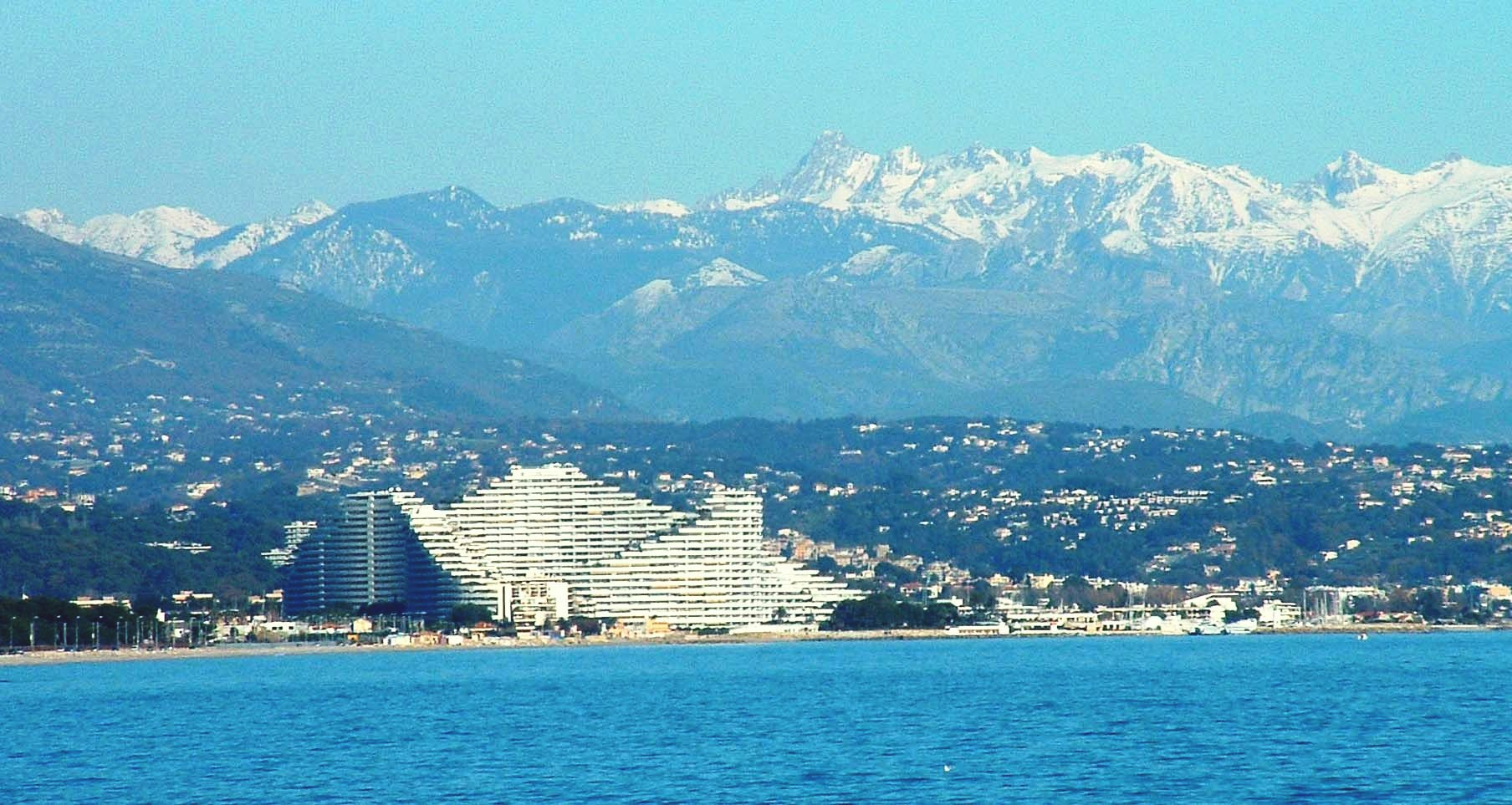
Marina Baie des Anges by André Minangoy

Villeneuve-Loubet is the birthplace of the famous 19th century provençal chef, restaurateur, and culinary writer Auguste Escoffier, the author of the Guide Culinaire and the founder of French haute cuisine. Villeneuve-Loubet was also, from 1920 onwards, the home of Maréchal Philippe Pétain (1856–1951), the "Hero of Verdun" in World War I and chief of state of the Nazi-collaborationist État Français, commonly known as Vichy France, in World War II.

Marshall Philippe Pétain purchased a house called L'Ermitage in Villeneuve-Loubet circa 1920.

Villeneuve-Loubet was also the site of a battle in World War II when it was liberated by the First Special Service Force on 24 August 1944. The tower of the castle was damaged by a shell fired by the US Navy, and dozens of soldiers from both sides were killed or wounded. In 2006, the bodies of fourteen Germans who were killed during the fighting were discovered in a mass grave near the town by a local medical student.

== Population ==
Historical population
Year	Pop.	±% p.a.
1968	3,865	—
1975	6,001	+6.49%
1982	8,083	+4.35%
1990	11,539	+4.55%
1999	12,935	+1.28%
2007	13,972	+0.97%
2012	14,814	+1.18%
2017	15,241	+0.57%
2023	17,548	+2.38%
Source: INSEE

== International relations ==
The commune is twinned with:

- Forlimpopoli, Italy

== See also ==
- Communes of the Alpes-Maritimes department
