= Löwstädt =

Löwstädt may refer to:

- Carl Teodor Löwstädt (1787–1829), Swedish printmaker and artist
- Emma Löwstädt-Chadwic (1855–1932), Swedish painter
- Eva Löwstädt-Åström (1855–1942), Swedish painter and graphic artist
- Rudolf Löwstädt (1820–1905), Swedish tailor and publisher
