= The Town (Strindberg) =

Painting by August Strindberg

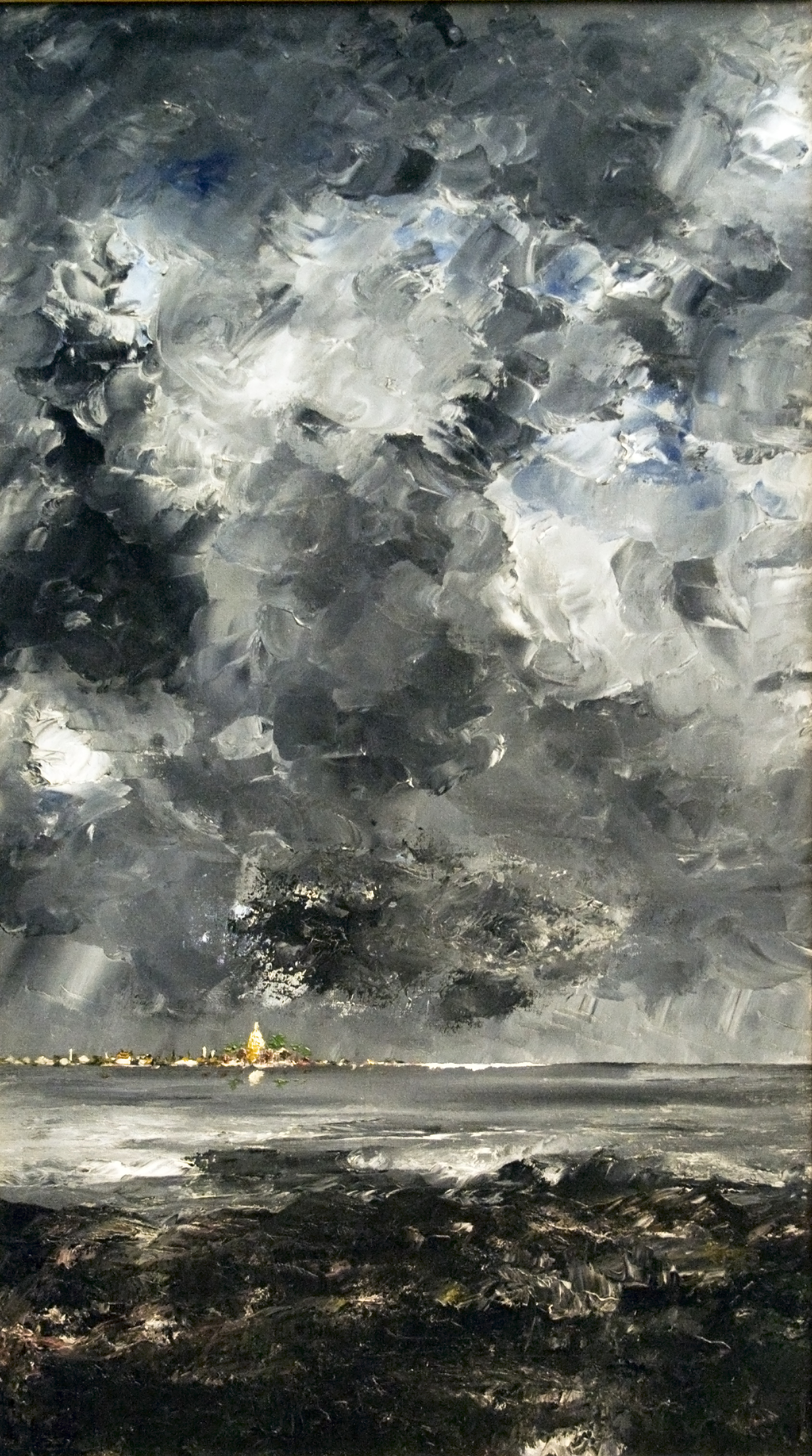
- Artist: August Strindberg
- Year: 1903
- Medium: oil on canvas
- Dimensions: 94.5 cm × 53 cm (37.2 in × 21 in)
- Location: Nationalmuseum, Stockholm

The Town is an oil on canvas painting by August Strindberg, from 1903. It is shown at the Nationalmuseum, in Stockholm.

== Strindberg as a painter ==
August Strindberg had no training in art. He painted only in periods, mainly landscapes and seascapes with dramatic waves and skies. He painted choppy sea in the storm with seething waves, clouds of rebellion and burnings that whips against the rocky shores. His painting method remained personally improvised.

He painted mostly in periods of crisis, when he had difficulty writing. He did not have a breakthrough as a painter until long after his death. He has come to be regarded as a pioneer of expressionism as an art form in Sweden. In the 1870s he spent time with several young artists such as Carl Larsson and others in Grez-sur-Loing then himself began attempts in painting. He also worked as an art critic.

== Painting ==
The Town is an oil painting made with a palette knife, with thick layers of paint laid on the canvas. It is a landscape painting, with a town in the distance, its tallest building reflected in the water's surface. The painting is dominated by the dark colors of the high sky and clouds, with a color scheme in white, black and gray, with the brightly lit town's trees depicted in green.

== See also ==
- List of paintings by August Strindberg
