= Marcel Courmes =

French pilot and engineer (1885–1950)

Marcel Louis Courmes
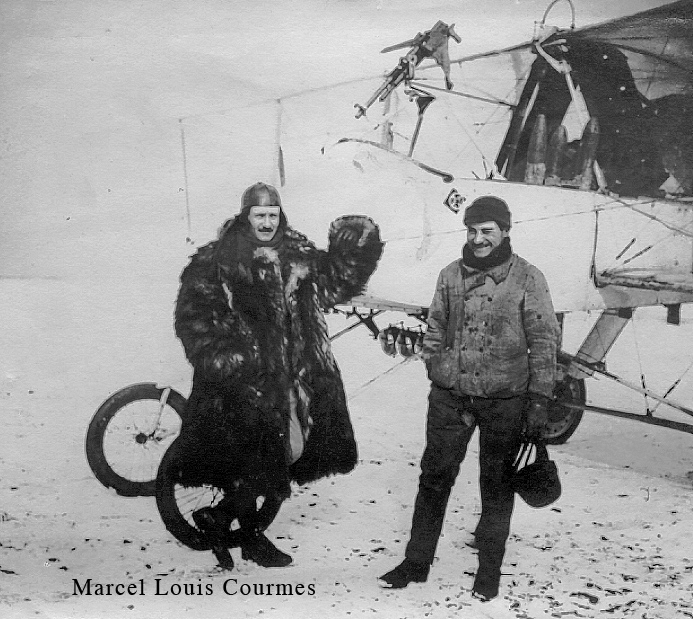
- Marcel Courmes in 1915
- Born: 13 June 1885; Marseille
- Died: 5 May 1950 (aged 64); Neuilly-sur-Seine, France
- Burial place: Neuilly-sur-Seine
- Alma mater: École spéciale militaire de Saint-Cyr, École de cavalerie, Saumur
- Relatives: Courmes family
- Military career
- Allegiance: French Republic
- Branch: French Army Light Aviation
- Rank: Squadron Leader
- Awards: Knight of the Legion of Honour on 6 July 1929
- Other work: Sound cinematographers

Marcel Louis Henry Joseph Léon Courmes (13 June 1885 – 5 May 1950) was a French military officer and aviator during the First World War, and later one of the first French sound cinematographers.

== Biography ==
=== Family and background ===
Courmes was born on June 13, 1885, to Euphémie Segond and Captain Arthur Louis Courmes (1849–1921), a Knight of the Legion of Honour. His paternal lineage traces back to Luc Courmes, a Huguenot captain born in 1580 in Grasse. He was also the great-grandnephew of Claude-Marie Courmes, who served as deputy of Var, mayor of Grasse, and was a Knight of the Legion of Honour.

On March 21, 1910, Courmes married Louise Read Chadwick, the daughter of American painter Francis Brooks Chadwick and Swedish painter Emma Löwstädt-Chadwick, in Grez-sur-Loing.

Courmes had a son, Lieutenant Christian Courmes (1913–1987), and a daughter, Gilberte Courmes. Christian was imprisoned in 1942 at Colditz fortress, where he participated two escape attempts, that became known as "The Metro" and "The French Tunnel". Gilberte married Colonel Maurice Delage, a Companion of Liberation, who served with General Leclerc's "Force L" and established the 13th Engineering Battalion of the 2nd Armored Division. Delage eventually took part in the invasion of Normandy and the Liberation of Paris.

=== Military career ===
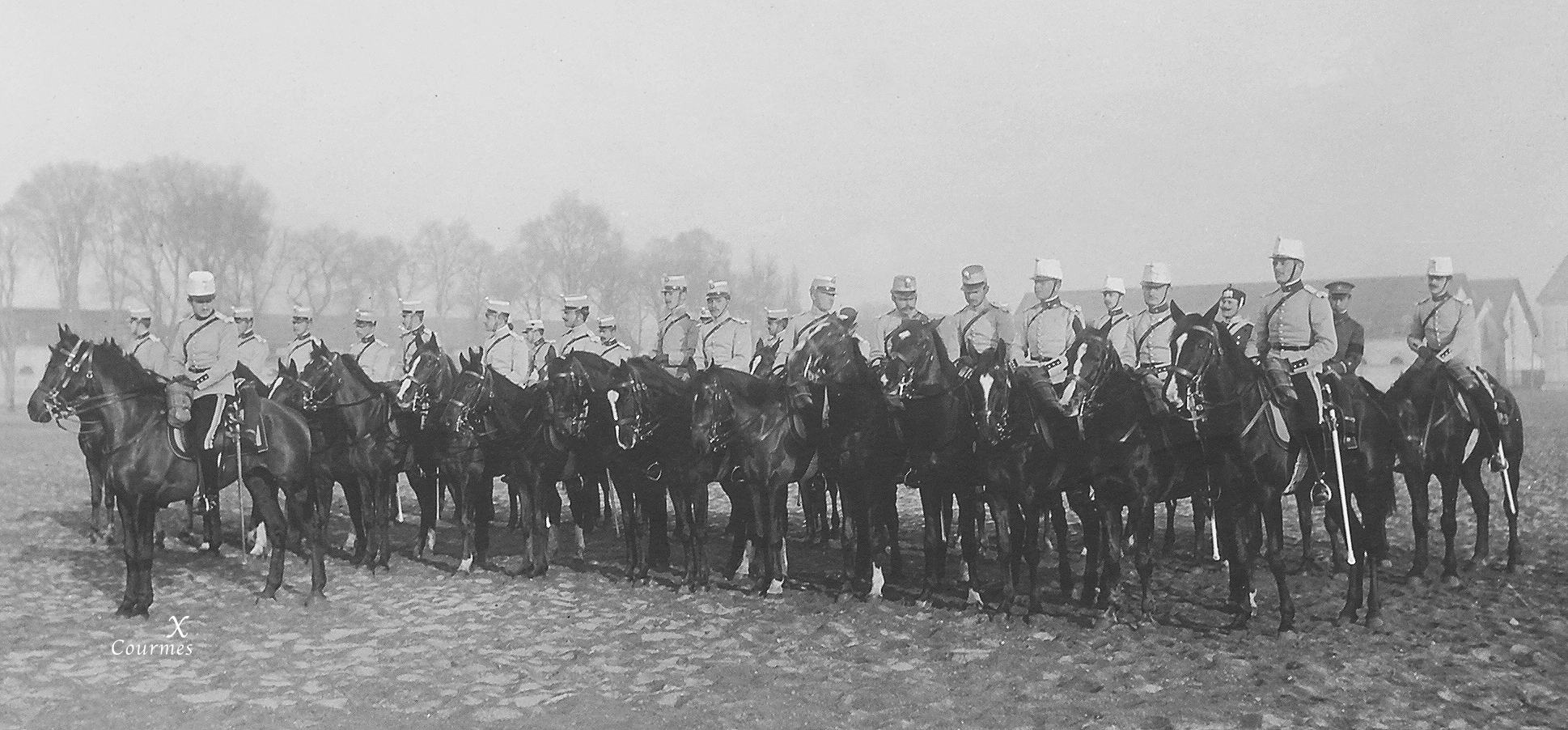
École de cavalerie de Saumur, France (1907–1909)

Courmes graduated 6th out of 277 from his class at the École spéciale militaire de Saint-Cyr, and Major out of 60 at École de cavalerie, Saumur.

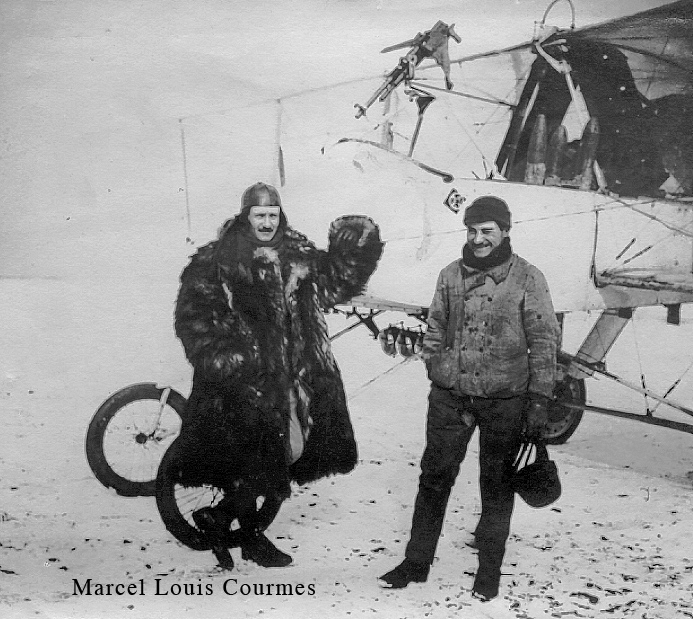
Captain Marcel Courmes as a pilot of the French 2nd Bombardment Group, GB 2, in August 1915

He was a classmate of Colonel de La Rocque and demonstrated his military loyalty to him by testifying as a character witness at La Rocque's trial. He was also close to the first Chinese Saint-Cyrien, General Prince Pao-Tchao Dan (1884–1958).

Courmes Coat of Arms

In 1907, he first served as a second lieutenant in the 5th African Hunter Regiment, then as lieutenant in the 2nd African Hunter Regiment from 1907–1908. During the Moroccan Campaign, he served in the 28th (1910–1911) and the 7th Dragoon Regiment (1913). He was described in his service record as a "brilliant but dreamy, excessively artistic cavalry officer who has a tendency towards too much benevolence in his command, which can have serious disadvantages in times of war."

In 1914, he was a special staff officer of the 4th Dragoon Regiment. He joined the French Air Force on August 1, 1915, in the French 2nd Bombardment Group, and then served in the Escadrille F 63. His service record categorised him as "an officer of perfect education, of an independent character who has great qualities of composure, courage and willpower, which make him an excellent pilot."

=== Career in film ===
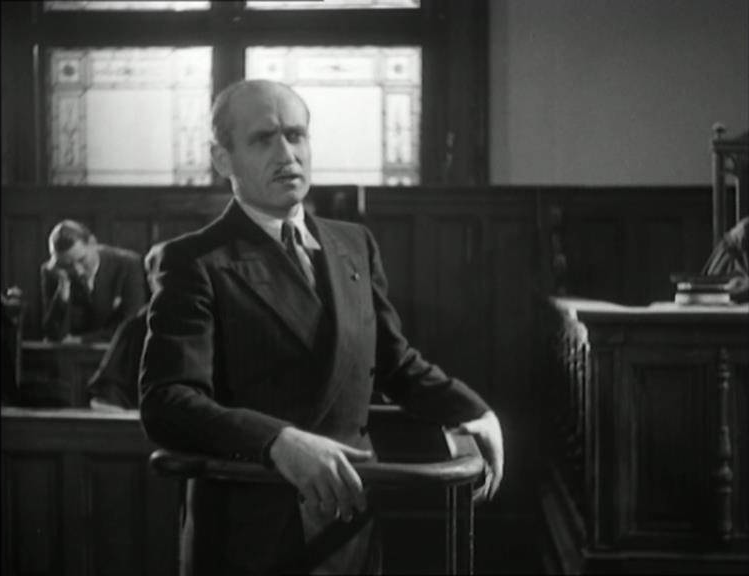
Marcel Courmes as an actor and artistic director for La chienne at Jean Renoir 1931

Courmes was one of the first French sound cinematographers, along with Joseph de Bretagne, with both working on many French films of the 1930s. In 1931, the pair featured in film La Chienne directed by Jean Renoir, for which Courmes was both the artistic director and played the role of "The Colonel". Courmes and Bretagne were supported by technical advisors from Western Electric, Bell and Hotchckiss, who assisted in direct capture of outdoor sound. The pair's contribution is most apparent in the film's final sequence, a tracking shot with dialogue between Michel Simon and Alexis Godart on a busy street. The "sound trucks" necessary for this sequence were used by the novice technicians with the help of experts from Western Electric.

Courmes is also credited in Braunberger and Richebé films such as Fantômas (with Bell in 1932) and The Agony of the Eagles (1933, with Bell). He also recorded the street sounds of La Tête d'un homme for Julien Duvivier (1932, production Vandal et Delac) and those of Hôtel du Nord for Marcel Carné in 1938. Later, with Bretagne again, he worked on the Renoir film Madame Bovary (1933) and Le Voyage de M. Perrichon (1934) by Jean Tarride.

== Awards and honors ==
Courmes obtained the following distinctions:

- Knight of the Legion of Honor (July 6, 1929)
- Croix de Guerre (1914–1918), with Palm
- Morocco commemorative medal (1909), Morocco Clasp
- Citation to the Order of the Army, number 32489 (July 13, 1916) with mention: "Bold and skillful pilot carried out 10 bombings, including 9 at night; this is particularly distinguished by carrying out successfully on the night of the 17th on May 18, 1916 a particularly perilous expedition to an important station."

== Filmography ==
Marcel Courmes was one of the first French sound cinematographers and was also the artistic director of Jean Renoir's film La Chienne. He participated in the following films

- 1931 : La Chienne by Jean Renoir
- 1931 : L'Amour à l'américaine by Paul Fejos
- 1932 : Fantômas by Paul Fejos
- 1932 : Criminel by Jack Forrester
- 1933 : L'agonie des aigles by Roger Richebé
- 1933 : La tête d'un homme by Julien Duvivier
- 1933 : L'Homme à l'Hispano by Jean Epstein
- 1933 : Madame Bovary by Jean Renoir
- 1933 : Quelqu'un a tué by Jack Forrester
- 1933 : Tire-au-flanc by Henry Wulschleger
- 1933 : Tour de chant by Alberto Cavalcanti
- 1934 : Cessez le feu by Jacques de Baroncelli
- 1934 : Les nuits moscovites by Alexis Granowsky
- 1934 : Le Voyage de monsieur Perrichon by Jean Tarride
- 1935 : Le comte Obligado by Léon Mathot
- 1935 : Le Billet de mille by Marc Didier
- 1935 : Quelle drôle de gosse by Léo Joannon
- 1935 : Golgotha by Julien Duvivier
- 1935 : Les yeux noirs by Victor Tourjanski
- 1935 : Le Roman d'un jeune homme pauvre by Abel Gance
- 1936 : Sous les yeux d'occident by Marc Allégret
- 1936 : Aventure à Paris by Marc Allégret
- 1936 : Partie de campagne by Jean Renoir
- 1936 : Les Hommes nouveaux by Marcel L'Herbier
- 1936 : Tarass Boulba by Alexis Granowsky
- 1936 : Opéra de Paris by Claude Lambert (short film)
- 1936 : Le grand refrain by Yves Mirande
- 1937 : Vous n'avez rien à déclarer? by Léo Joannon
- 1937 : Les Perles de la couronne by Sacha Guitry
- 1938 : Orage by Marc Allégret
- 1938 : Hôtel du Nord by Marcel Carné
- 1938 : Carrefour by Kurt Bernhardt
- 1938 : Durand bijoutier by Jean Stelli
- 1938 : Lumières de Paris by Richard Pottier
- 1938 : Le train pour Venise by André Berthomieu
- 1939 : La charrette fantôme by Julien Duvivier
- 1939 : La famille Duraton by Christian Stengel
- 1939 : Le déserteur by Léonide Moguy
- 1943 : L'Auberge de l'abîme by Willy Rozier
- 1943 : Les Deux timides by Yves Allégret
- 1943 : Le camion blanc by Léo Joannon

== Bibliography ==
- René Martel (1939). L'aviation française de bombardement, des origines au 11 novembre 1918 (in French). Paul Hartmann.
