= Fernande Sadler =

French painter and engraver (1869–1949)

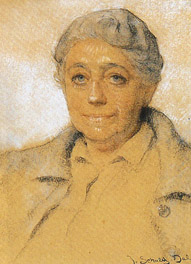
- Self-portrait, c. 1930
- Born: 7 July 1869; Toul, France
- Died: 2 December 1949 (aged 80); Nemours, France
- Known for: Painting, collecting and mayor

Fernande Sadler (7 July 1869 – 2 December 1949) was a French painter and engraver. She established the art collection at Grez-sur-Loing and became the mayor of that town in 1945.

== Life ==
Sadler was born on 7 July 1869 in Toul.

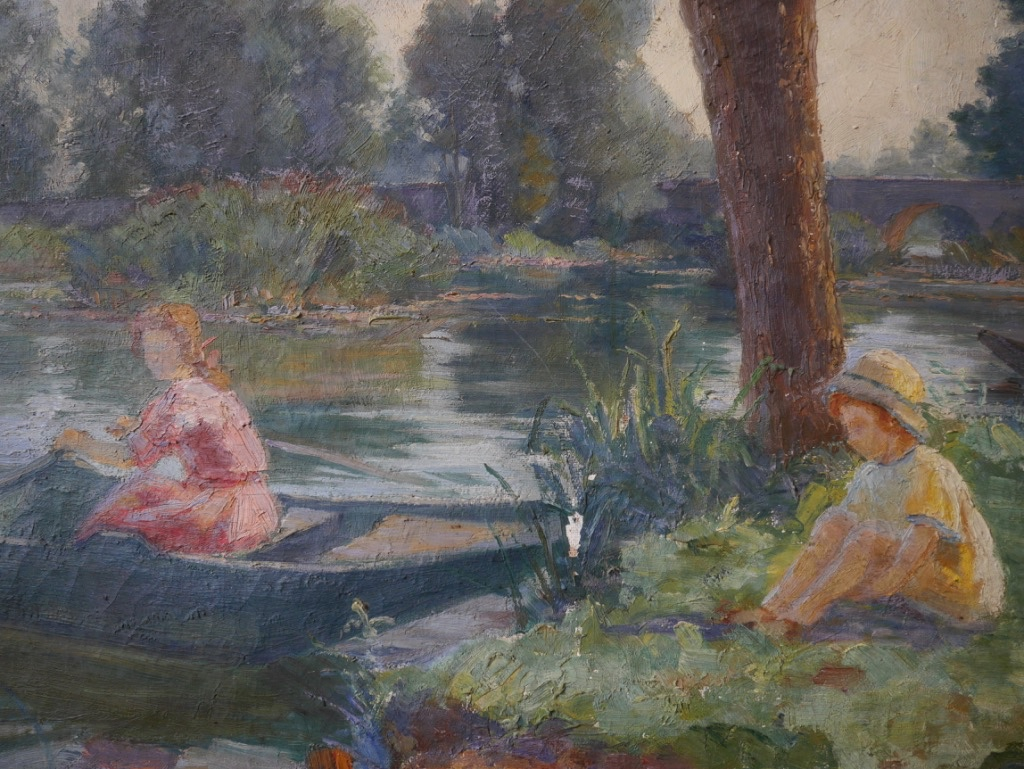
Young Girls On The Edge Of Loing – Oil On Canvas

She trained at the Julian Academy and studied with Marcel Baschet and Henri Lucien Doucet. She exhibited at the Nancy and Paris Salons. She began at the Paris Salon in 1894 and exhibited miniature paintings at the Nancy Salon.

She made her home in Grez-sur-Loing and painted pictures of the area. The town was popular with artists including the visitors like the Glasgow Boys. In 1910 she began to collect paintings for the town, prompted by a suggestion and donations by Charles Moreau-Vauthier. The local museum now houses the collection which still receives donations by visiting artists.

She had shown an interest in art documenting the role of local and visiting artists. In 1907 she was awarded a silver medal by the Société de Géographie for her monograph on the artists of Grez-sur-Loing. Sadler became Grez-sur-Loing's mayor in 1945. The town has her self portrait in their collection.

Sadler died in 1949 in Nemours.

== Bibliography ==
- Harcos "Painters and engravers from Lorraine"
