= List of paintings by August Strindberg =

This is a gallery of August Strindberg's paintings.

== Paintings ==
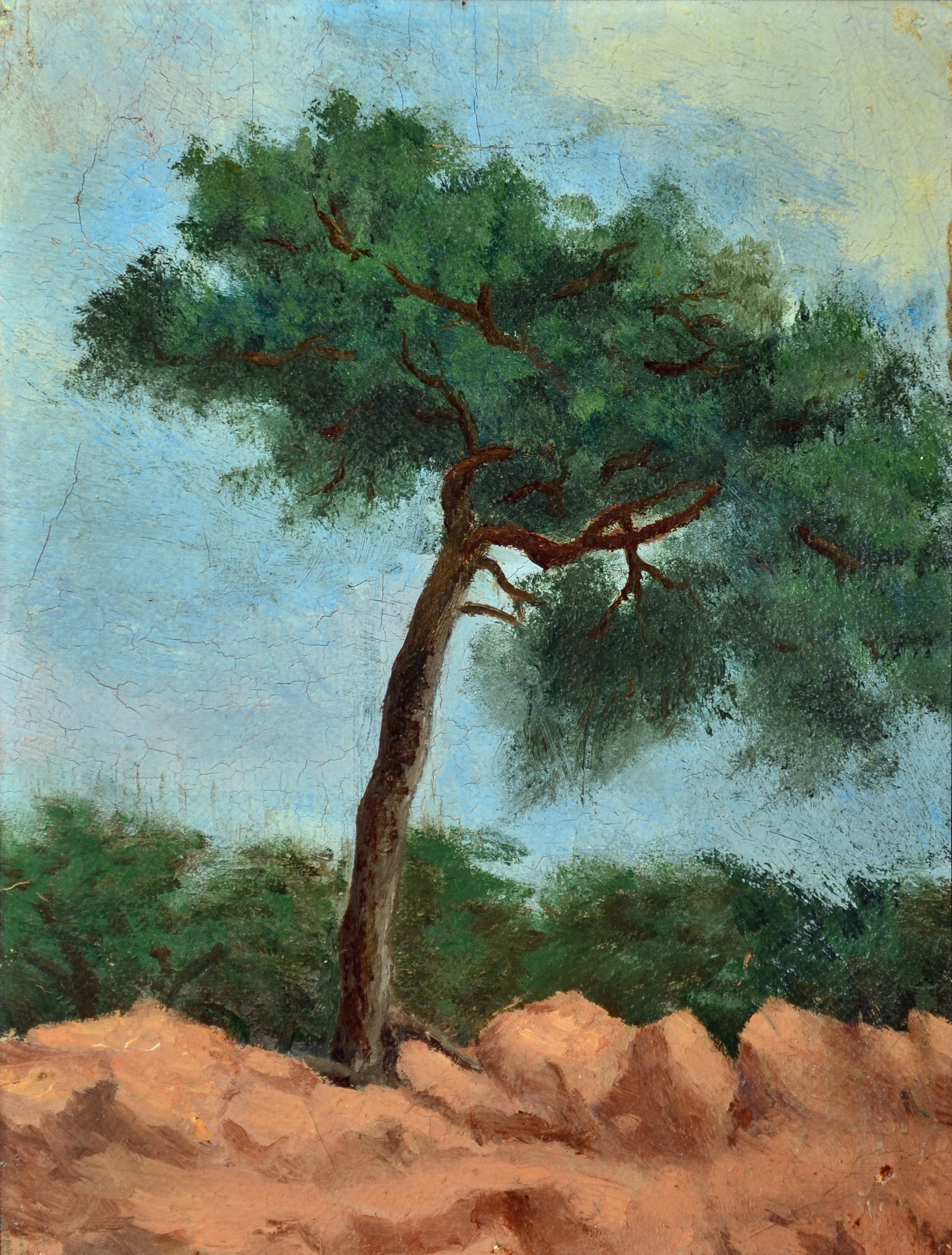
The Pine, 1873

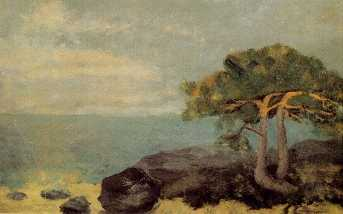
Beach Party, 1873

Double Vision, 1892

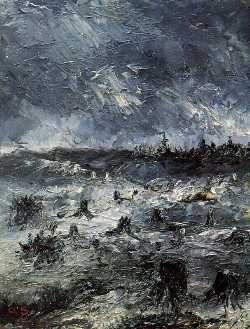
Land Clearing, 1892

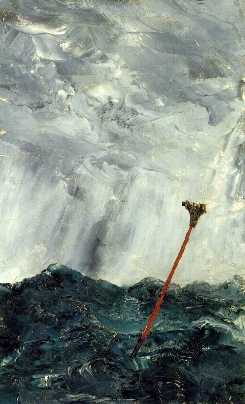
Ruskprick II, 1892

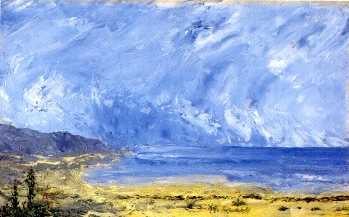
Flower At The Beach, 1892

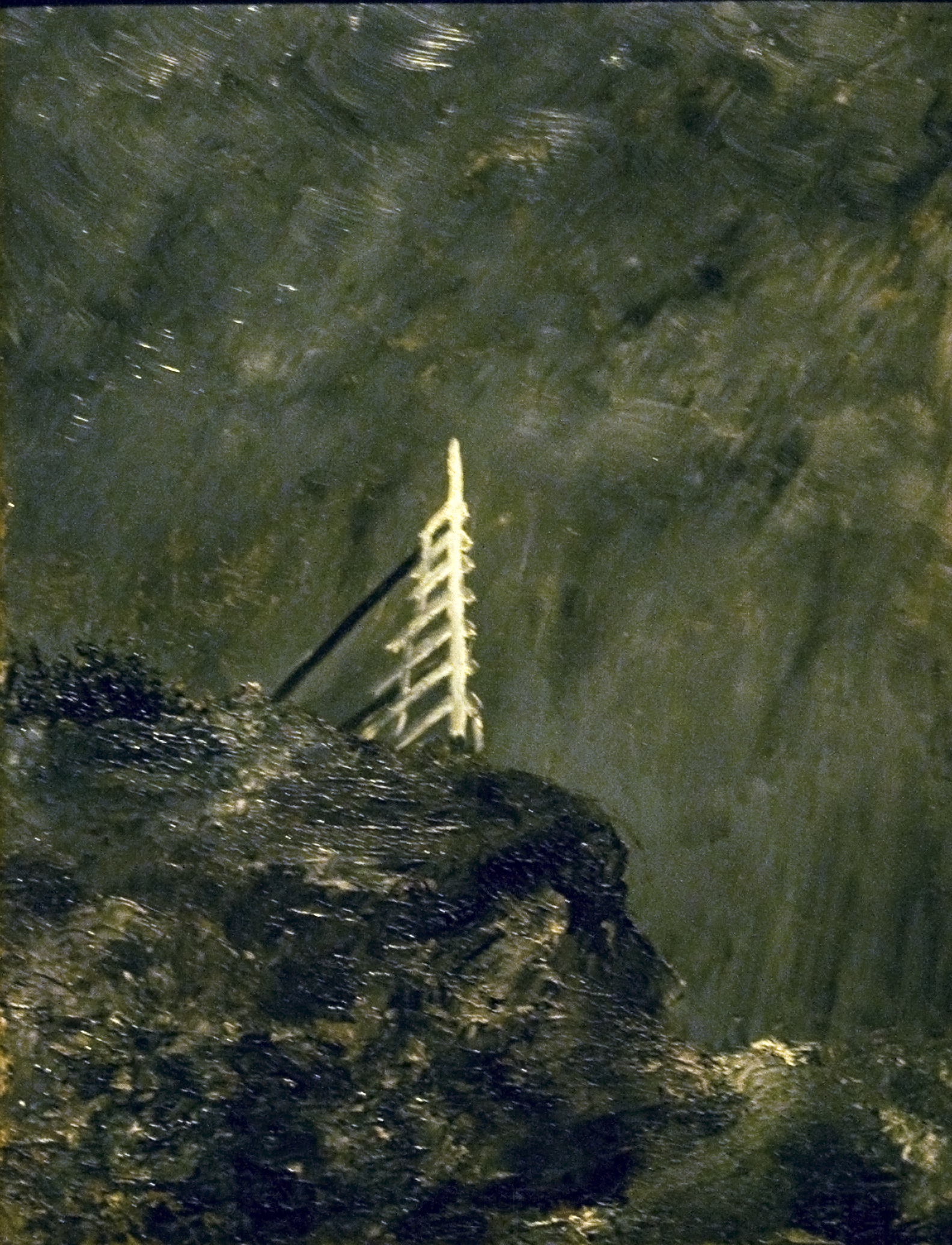
The White Mare II, 1892

Jealousy Night, 1893

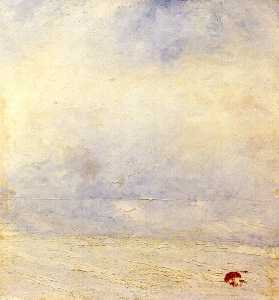
Den Ensamma Giftsvampen, 1893

Flooding On The Danube, 1894

Beach Image, 1894

Snowstorm On The Sea, 1894

High Level Of Lake, 1894

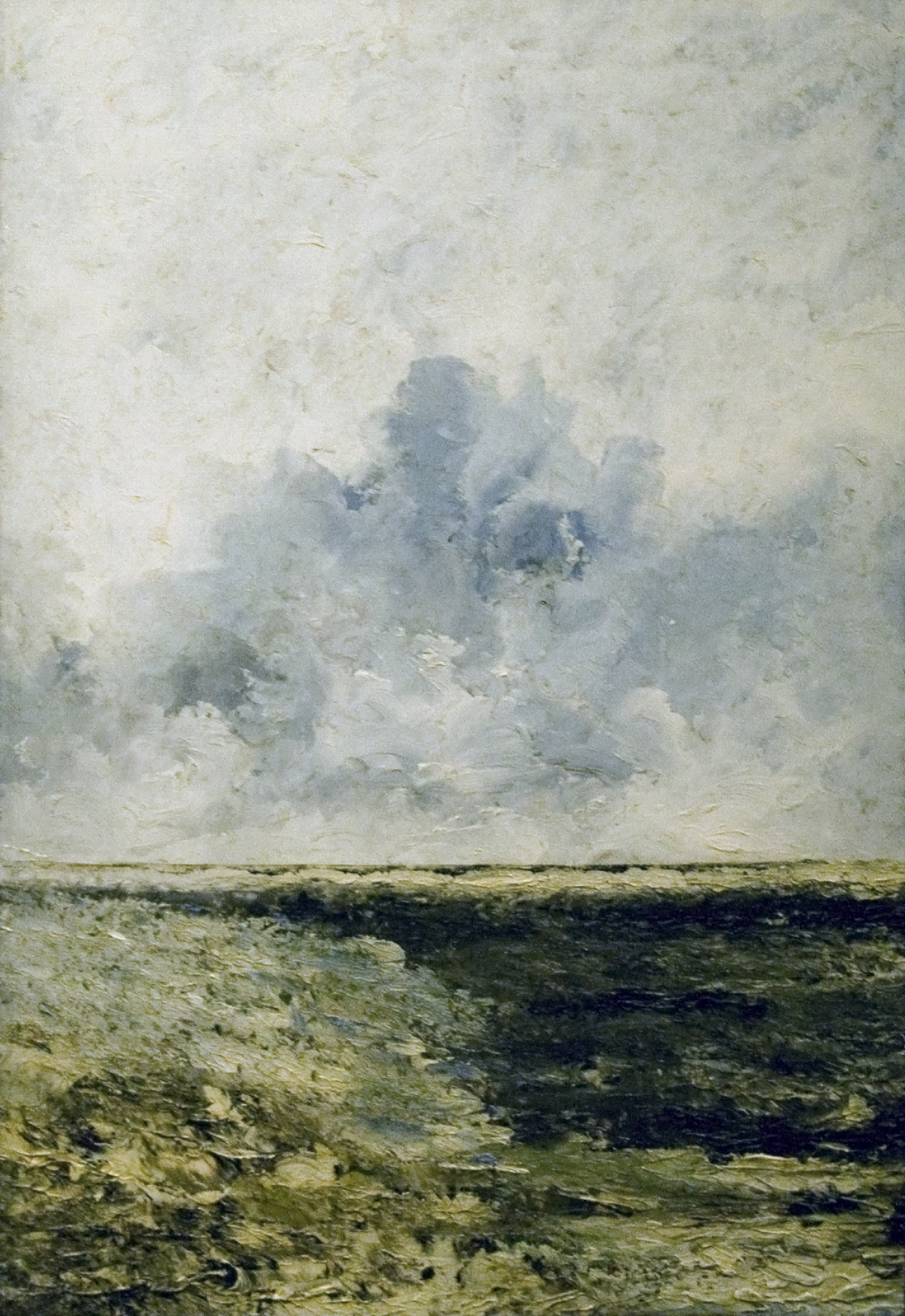
Seascape, 1894

Baby's First Cradle, 1901

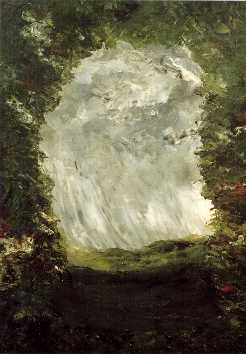
Inferno, 1901

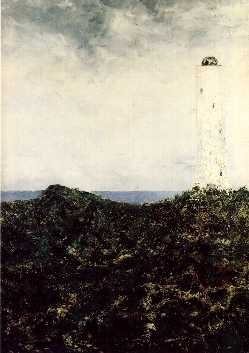
Lighthouse II, 1901

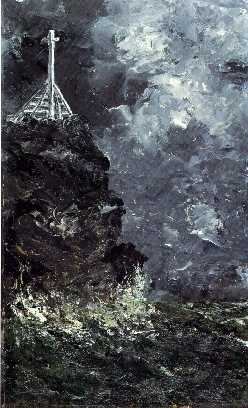
White Mare IV, 1901

Coastal Landscape, 1901

Libra VIII, 1902

Sun Goes Down Into The Sea, 1903

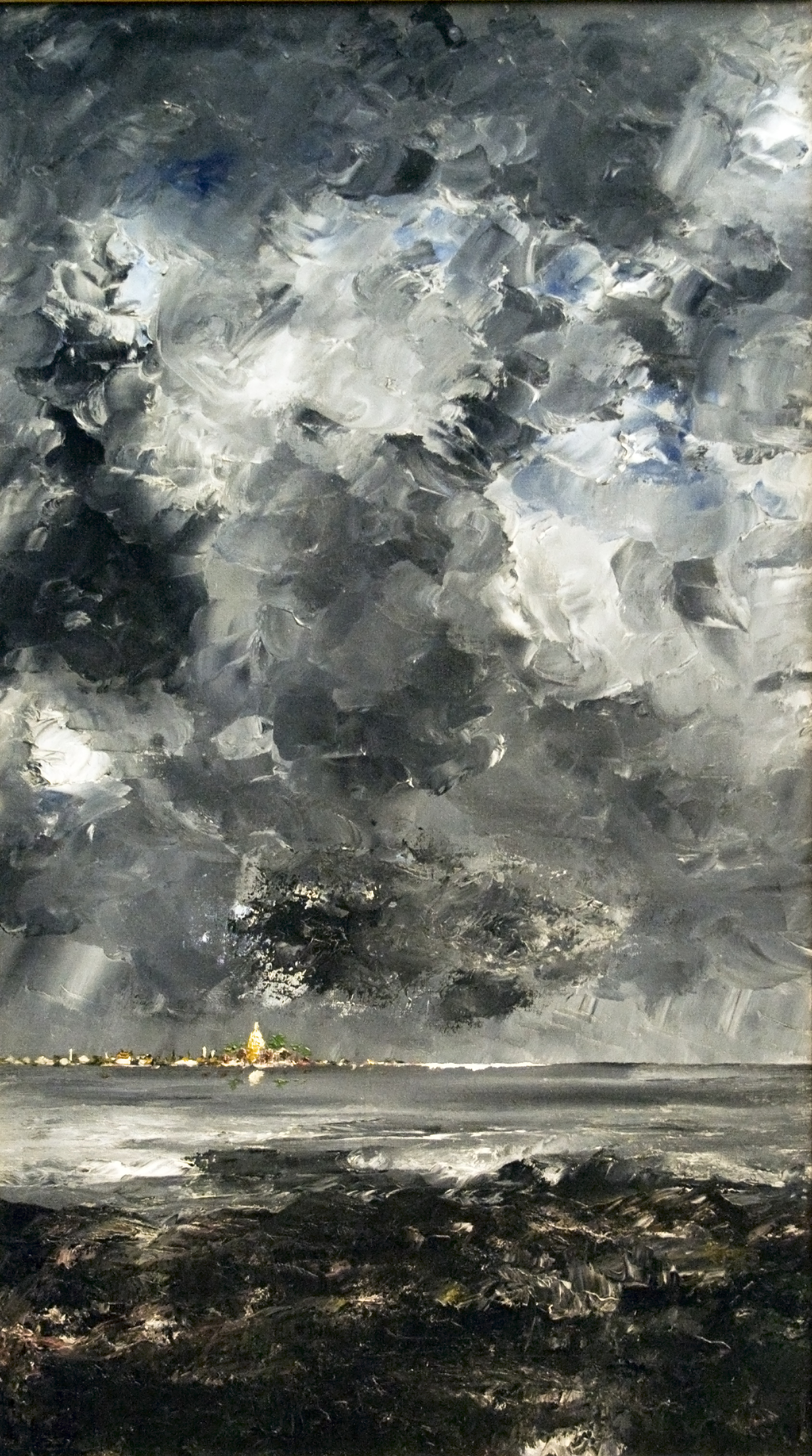
The Town, 1903

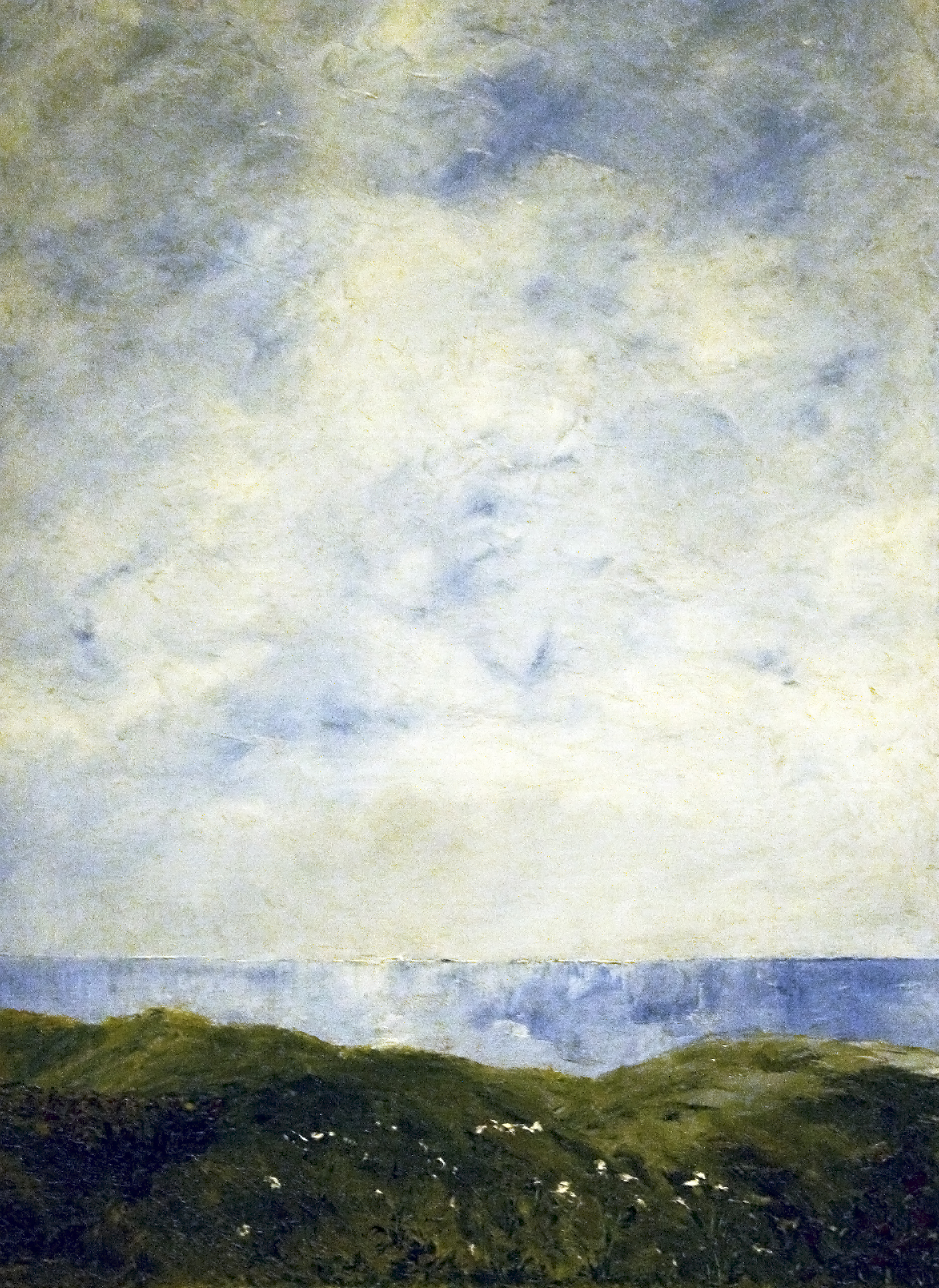
A Coast, 1903

== See also ==
- August Strindberg bibliography

== Resources ==
- Nolin, Bertil (1999). Theatre Research International. New York City, New York: Cambridge University Press. ISSN 0307-8833.
- Contemporary Authors Online. Detroit: Gale. 2010. ISBN 978-0-7876-3995-2.
