= Eva Löwstädt-Åström =

Swedish painter and graphic artist

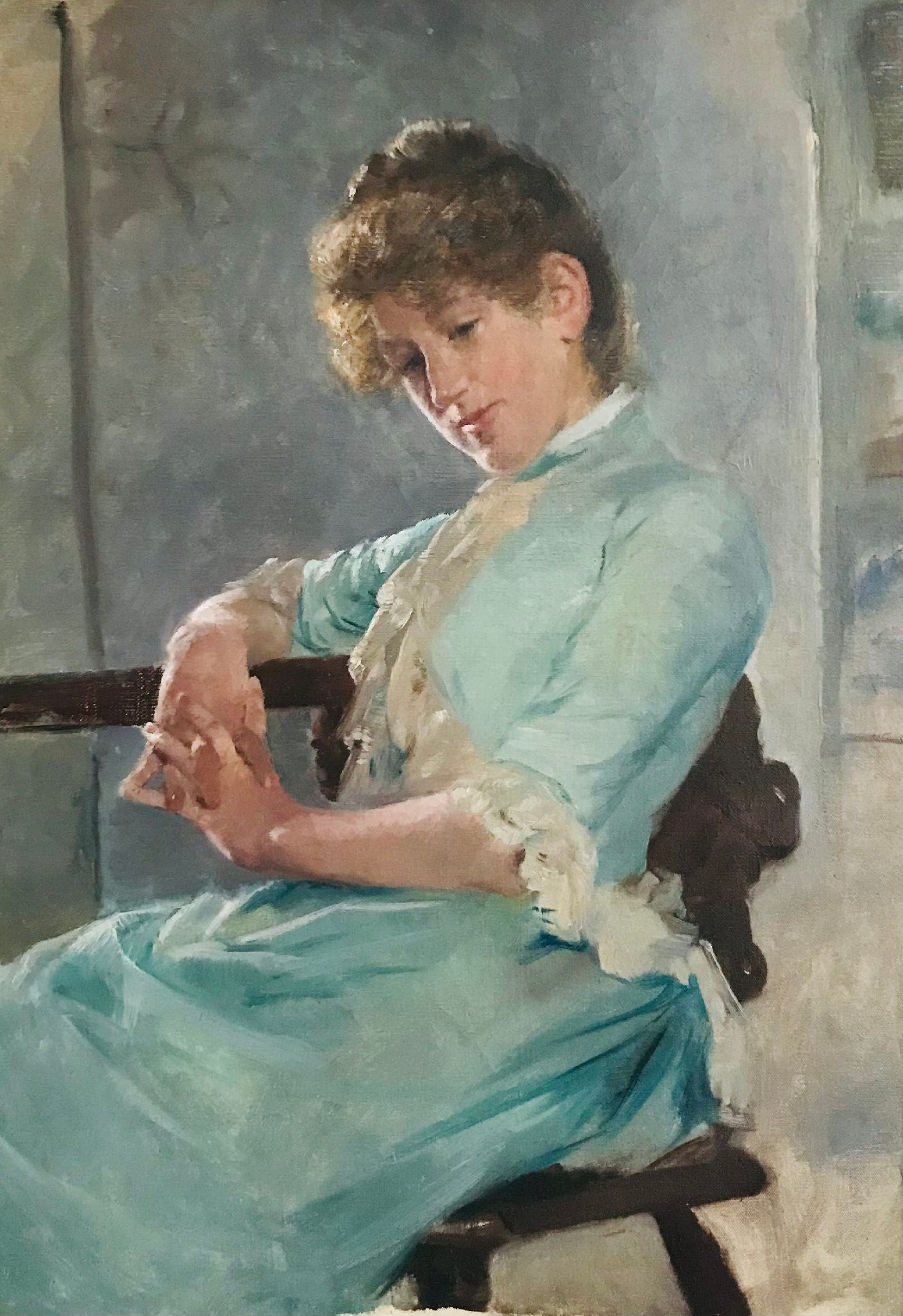
Eva Löwstädt-Åström portrait by her sister Emma Chadwick

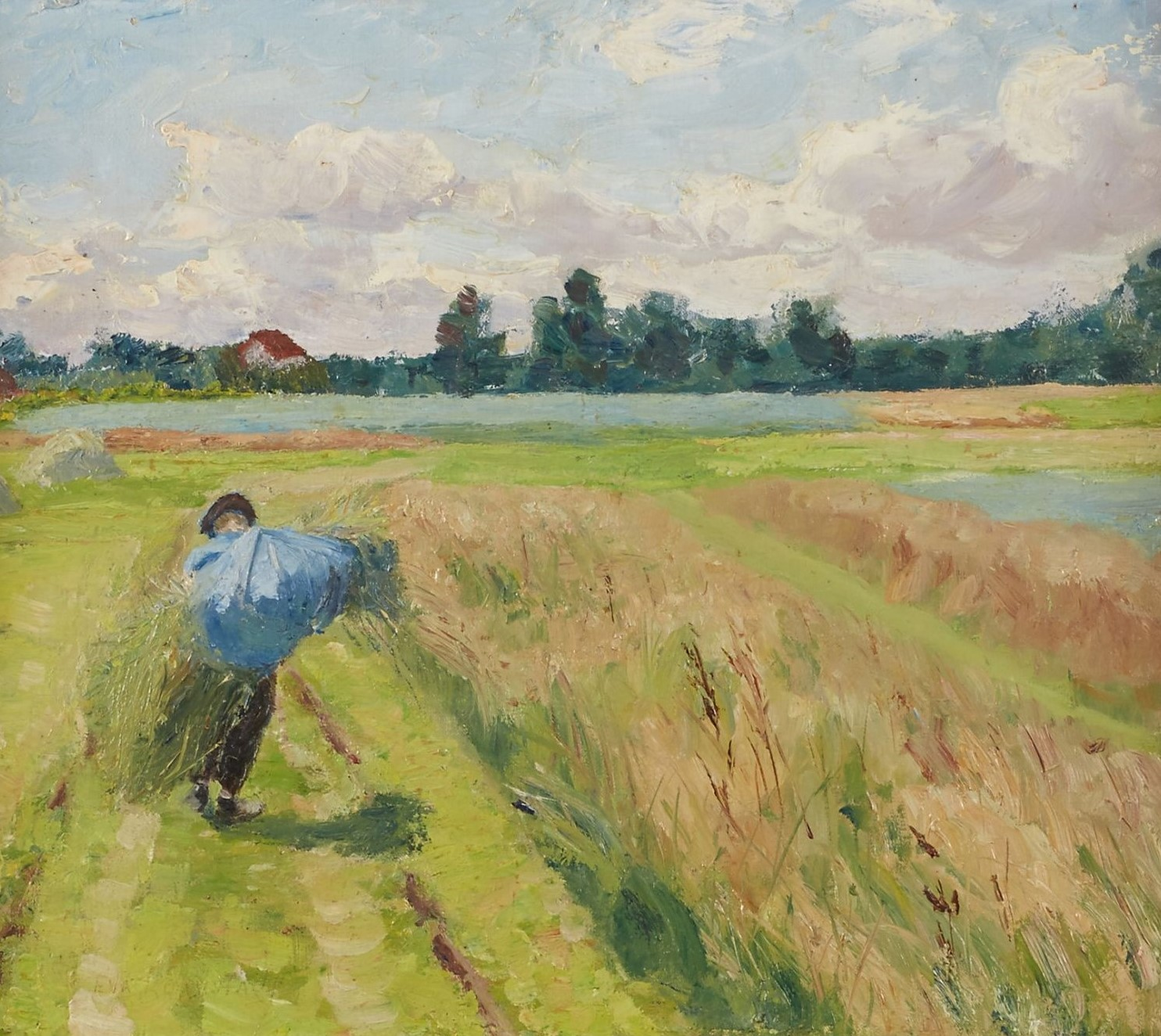
Harvest Landscape

Eva Matilda Löwstädt-Åström (5 May 1864 – 5 May 1942) was a Swedish painter and graphic artist. Several different dates and years are given for her birth. This one is taken from her tombstone.

== Biography ==
Eva Matilda Löwstädt was born in Stockholm in 1864. Her father, Rudolf Löwstädt, was a master tailor. Her grandfather, Carl Teodor Löwstädt, was also a painter and graphic artist. Her sister, Hilma Amalia Löwstädt (better known as Emma Chadwick) also became an artist.

After her primary education, she studied at the Kunsthochschule Tekniska Skolan (now known as the Konstfack) from 1885 to 1886. She also studied etching with Axel Tallberg. From 1887 to 1890, she continued her studies at the Académie Colarossi and the Académie Julian in Paris. This was followed by a three-year stay in Italy. Upon returning to Sweden, she married Ludvig Åström.

She became associated with the Konstnärsförbundets skola, and participated in many of their exhibitions. In the 1890s, she returned to France to visit her sister at the artists' colony in Grez-sur-Loing and would spend much of her life alternating between Stockholm and Paris. Most of her paintings are landscapes or floral still-lifes, in an Impressionistic style. Many of her works are at the Nationalmuseum and the Sundvalls museum.

Löwstädt-Åström died in Stockholm in 1942.
