= Francis Brooks Chadwick =

American-French painter

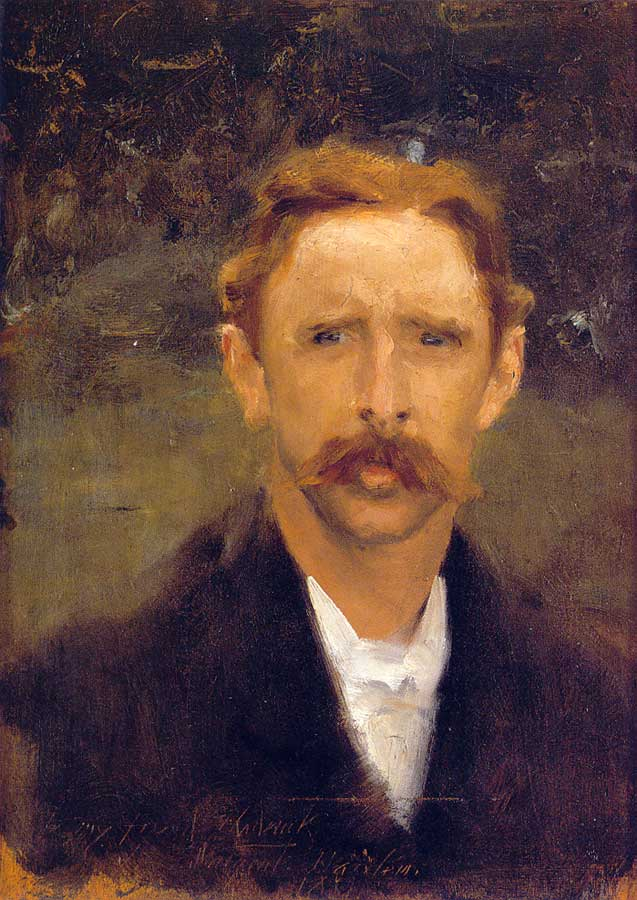
- Portrait by John Singer Sargent, 1880. Orlando Museum of Art
- Born: January 1, 1850; Boston, Massachusetts (Etats-Unis)
- Died: 1943; Groslay, Val-d'Oise (95) (France)
- Education: Harvard University, Académie Julian
- Known for: Painting
- Notable work: Rivière au printemps (Entre 1850 et 1943, RMN-Grand Palais (Musée d’Orsay) / Hervé Lewandowski; The Bridge at Grez sur Loing in the Springtime (1887), Adelson Galleries, New-York
- Movement: Impressionism

Francis Brooks Chadwick (Boston 1850 - Groslay 1943), was an American painter active in France.

== Biography ==
Born into a family of WASP in Boston, Chadwick studied at Harvard. To pursue his interest in art, he attended the Académie Julian in Paris.

He was cousins with the painters John Singer Sargent and Ralph Wormeley Curtis and travelled with them to Haarlem in 1880 and Bretagne.

The following year he married the Swedish painter Emma Löwstädt-Chadwick and they settled in Grez-sur-Loing, where he remained the rest of his life, though the couple travelled to other summer art colonies on vacation.

They had three children, including Louise Read Chadwick, wife of Squadron Leader Marcel Courmes

He is known for scenes of Grez.

== Portraits of Francis ==
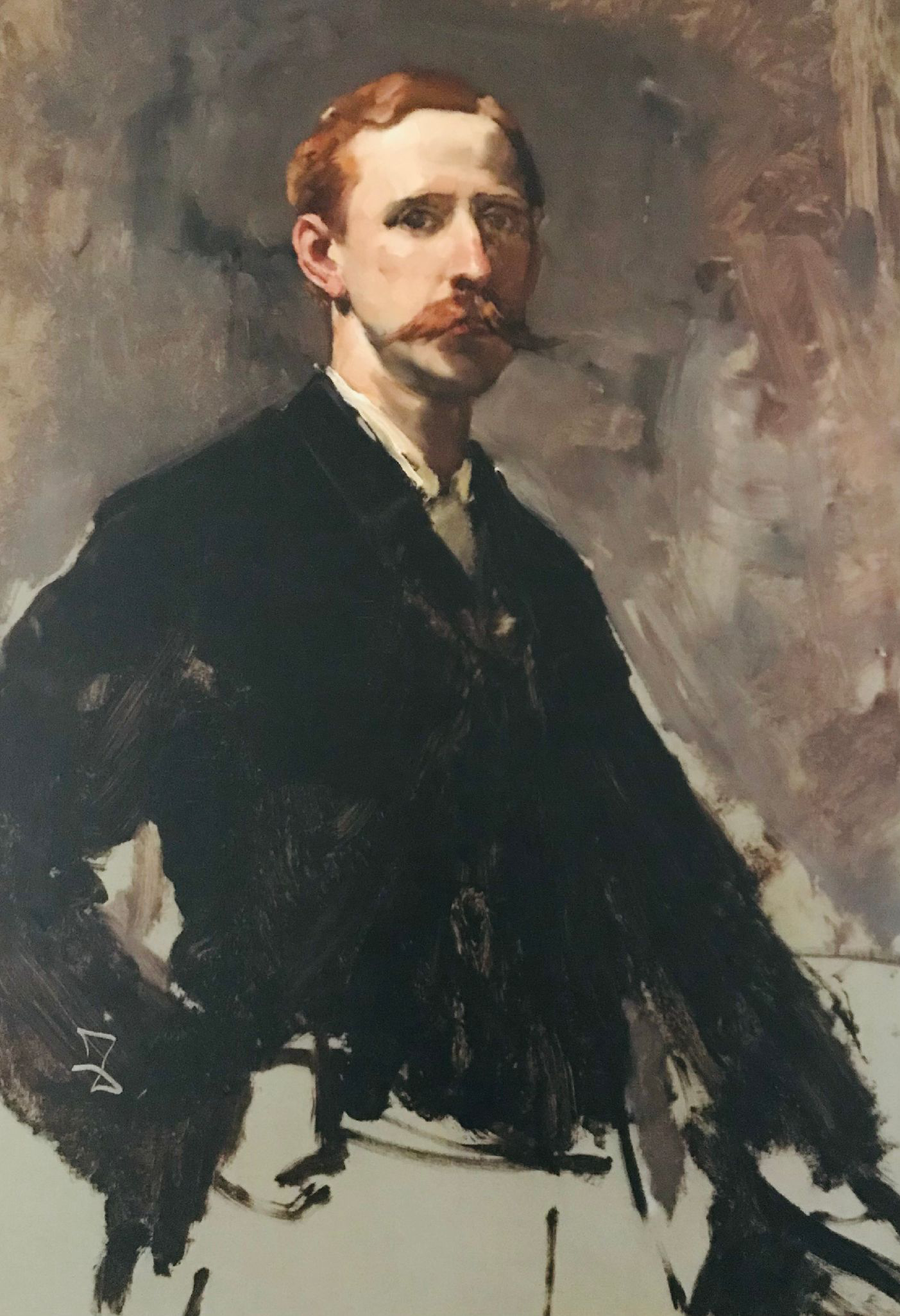
Francis B. Chadwick

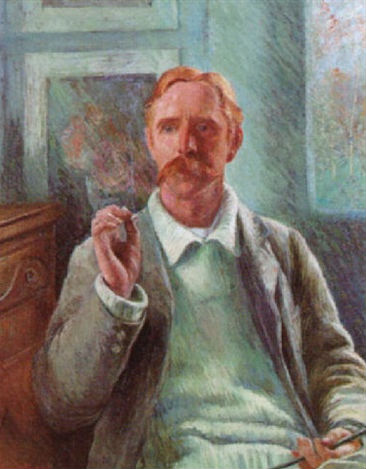
Francis B. Chadwick
portrait by his wife

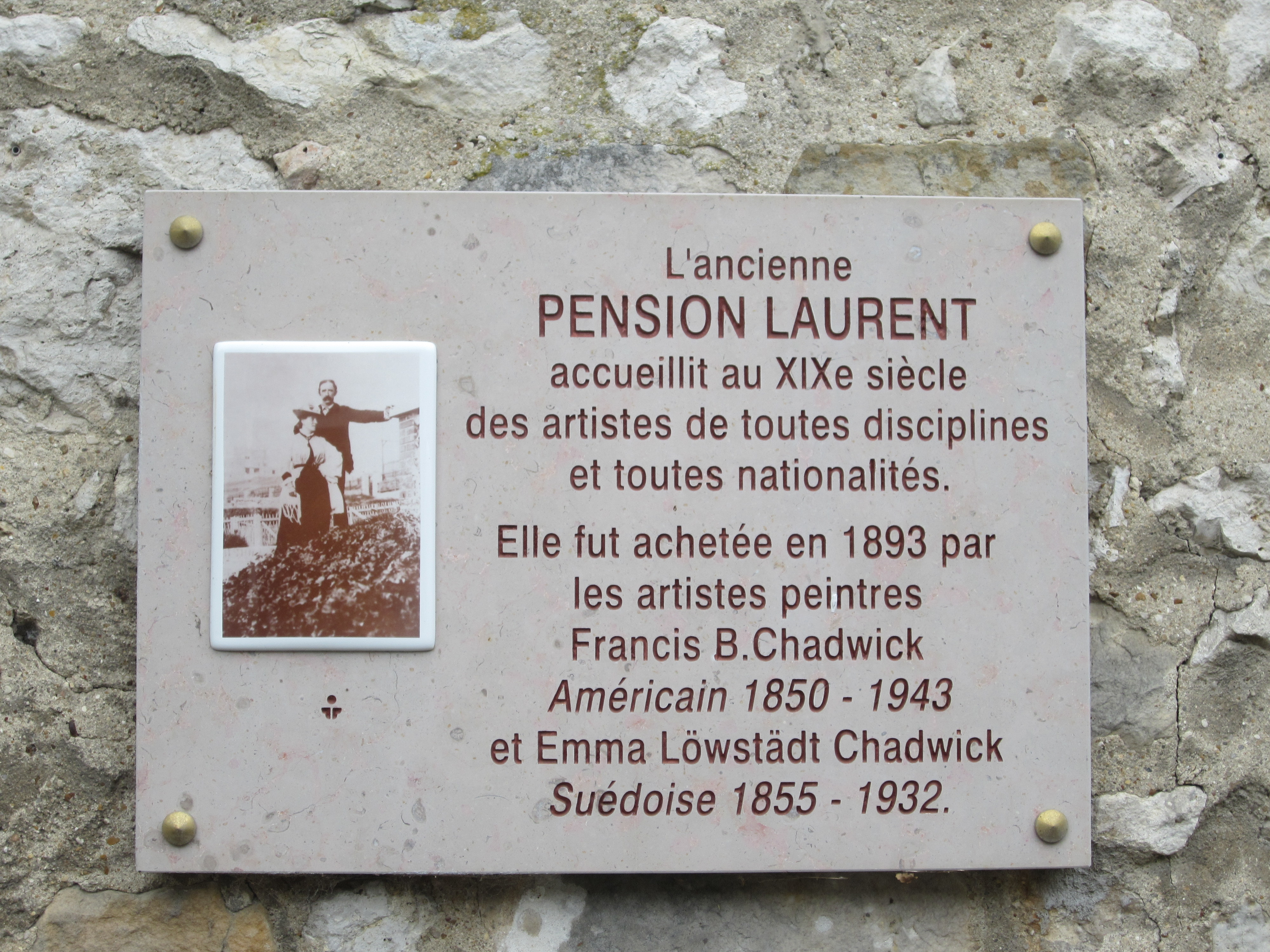
Chadwick street plaque in front of Chadwick' house, Grez-sur-Loing, France

== Portraits of Francis Family ==
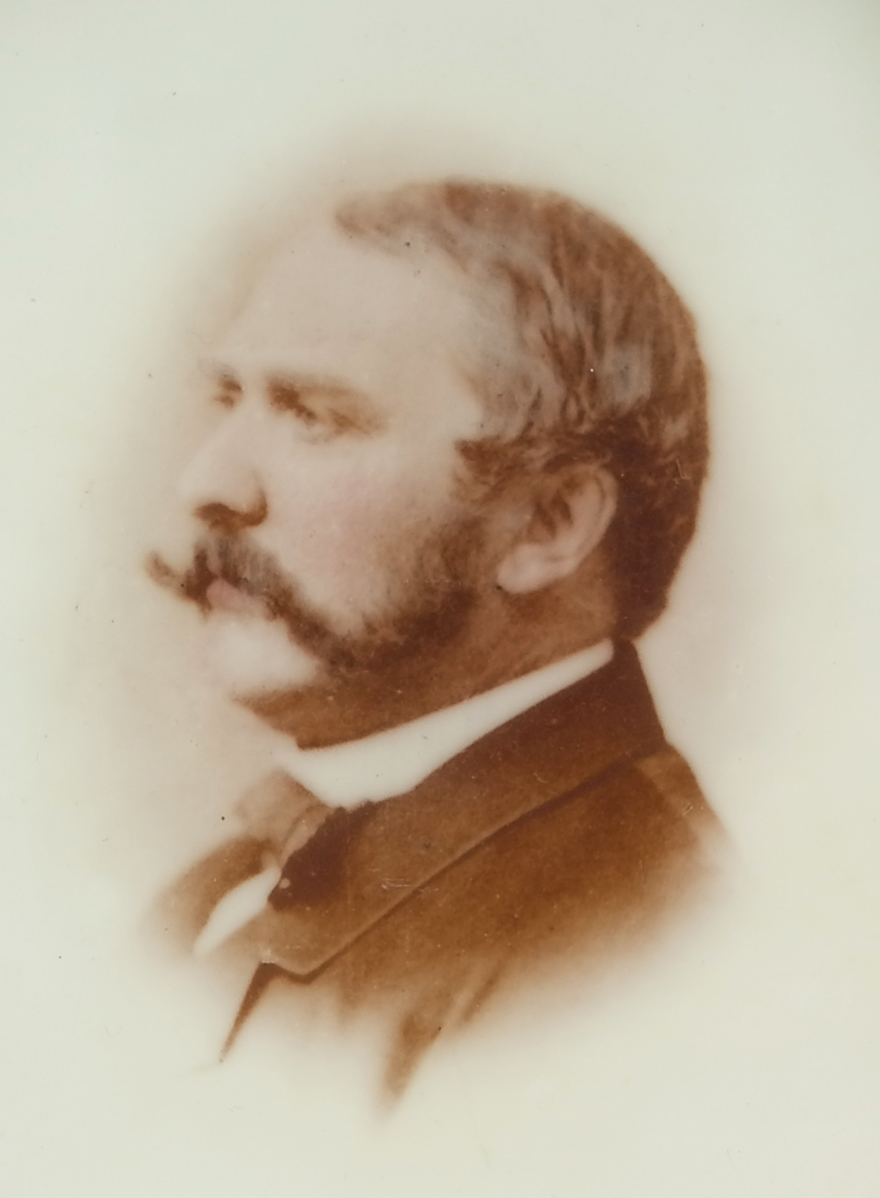
Christopher C. Chadwick
Father of Francis

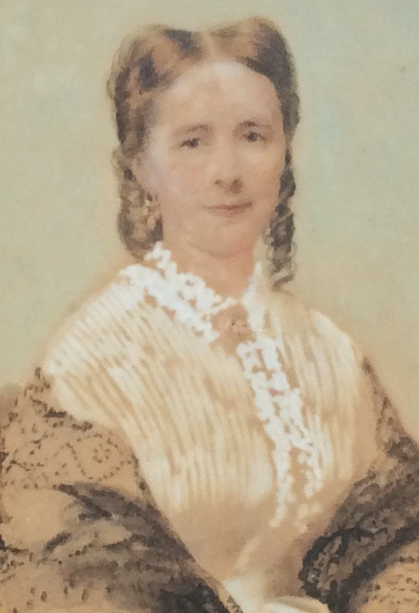
Louise Read Chadwick
Mother of Francis

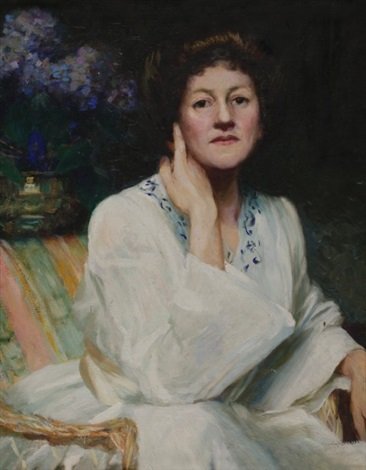
Emma Chadwick
Wife of Francis
