= Carl Teodor Löwstädt =

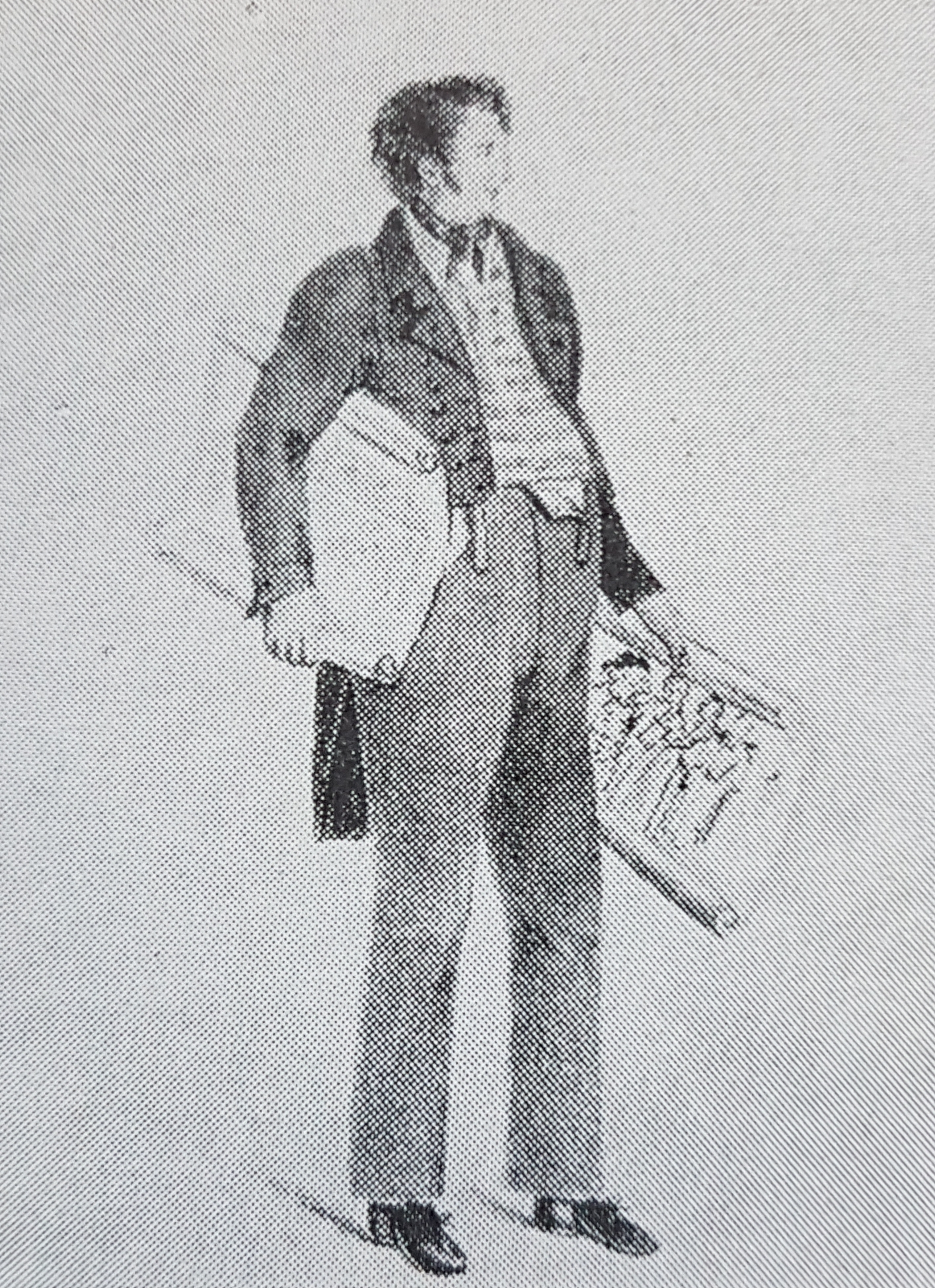
Self-portrait by Carl Theodor Löwstädt

Carl Teodor Löwstädt (16 September 1787 – 16 June 1829) was a Swedish printmaker and artist.

He was born in Stralsund in Swedish Pomerania. Works by him were exhibited in exhibitions at the Royal Swedish Academy of Fine Arts in 1813, 1815 and 1816, but it is not certain that he ever studied there. He was mainly a printmaker, and was one of the first artists in Sweden to use lithography as a printing technique. Löwstädt published several albums of caricatures, military uniforms and copies of historical artworks. In addition, he was active as an art teacher.

His son was publisher Rudolf Löwstädt, and his granddaughters Emma Chadwick and Eva Löwstädt-Åström were also artists. He died in Stockholm.

== Sources cited ==
- Dahl, Torsten, ed. (1948). Svenska män och kvinnor. Biografisk uppslagsbok [Swedish men and women. Biographical dictionary] (in Swedish). Vol. 5. Stockholm: Albert Bonnier. OCLC 4629338.
