= Emma Chadwick =

Swedish artist (1855–1932)

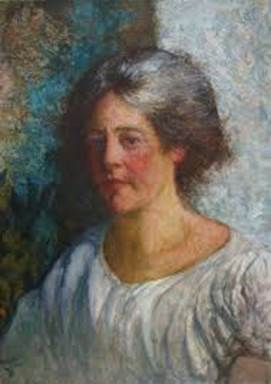
- Portrait by Francis B. Chadwick
- Born: Emma Hilma Amalia Löwstädt; 10 August 1855; Stockholm, Sweden
- Died: 2 January 1932 (aged 76); Avignon, France
- Known for: Painting
- Spouse: Francis B. Chadwick

Emma Chadwick, née Emma Hilma Amalia Löwstädt (10 August 1855, Stockholm – 2 January 1932, Avignon), was a Swedish painter who specialized in genre scenes and portraits.

== Biography ==
She was the granddaughter of Carl Teodor Löwstädt, an artist and printmaker who was originally from Swedish Pomerania. Her father, Rudolf was a master tailor. She began her artistic education at the Technical School, then studied at the Royal Swedish Academy of Fine Arts from 1874 to 1880. In 1881, after having spent the previous summers on the French coast, she went to Paris to finish her studies at the Académie Julian with Jean Charles Cazin and Tony Robert-Fleury. She had her first showing at the Salon her first year there.

She eventually settled in at the Swedish artists' colony in Grez-sur-Loing, where she met her husband, the American painter Francis Brooks Chadwick. They married and bought an inn there in 1887, which became a popular meeting place for the expatriate artists, They had three children including Louise Read Chadwick, wife of Squadron Leader Marcel Courmes. Five years later, they built a villa on the same property. While living there, she travelled extensively, visiting Brittany with her friend, Amanda Sidwall, and accompanying her husband on trips to Spain, North Africa, Italy, the United States and England. When an old friend from the Academy, Anders Zorn, came to visit, he remarked that she was beginning to forget how to speak Swedish.

She also gradually switched from painting to etching and became a member of the Grafiska sällskapet (Graphic Society) when it was created in 1910. She exhibited her work at the Palace of Fine Arts at the 1893 World's Columbian Exposition in Chicago, Illinois and continued to participate in exhibits at the Salon until 1924. A major retrospective of her work was arranged in 1940 by Gösta Stenman and shown at his gallery.

Her sister, Eva Löwstädt-Åström, was also a well known artist.

Chadwick was included in the 2018 exhibit Women in Paris 1850-1900.

== Selected paintings ==
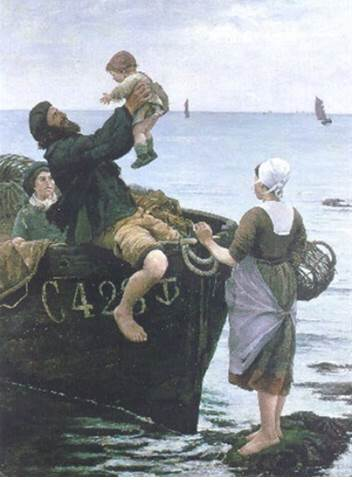
Off to Sea

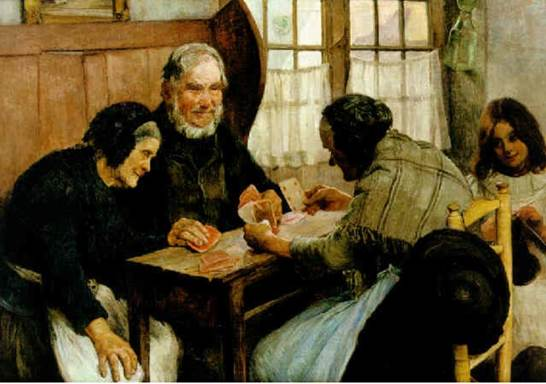
The Card Party

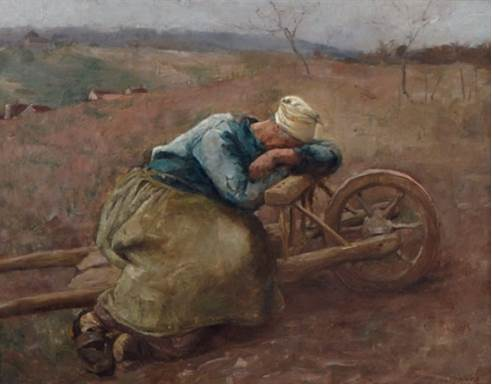
Resting

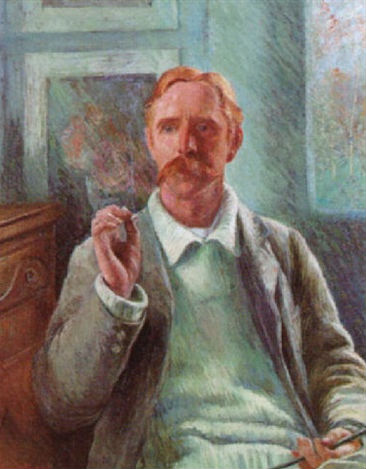
Portrait of her husband
Francis Brooks Chadwick

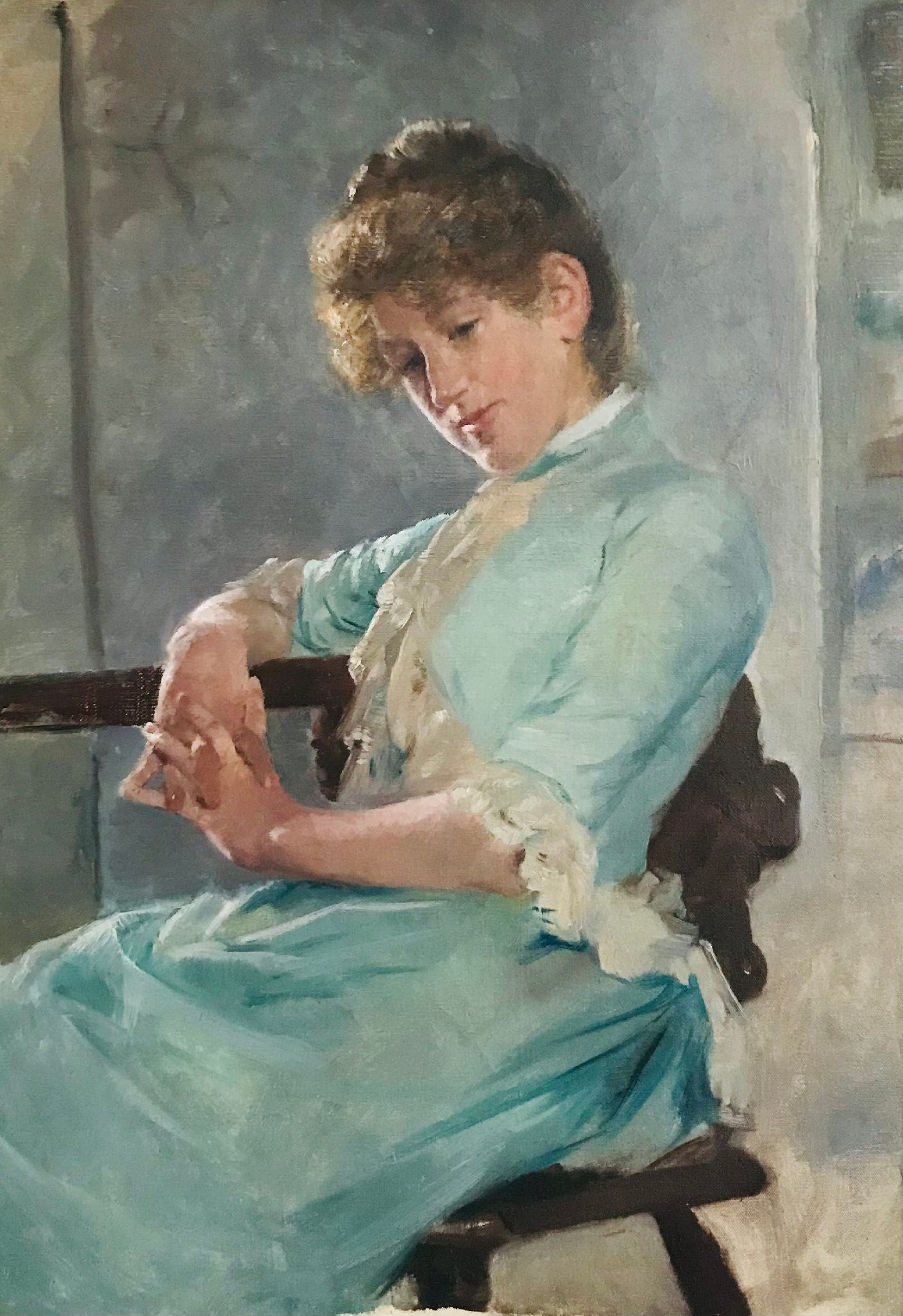
Portrait of her sister
Eva Löwstädt-Åström
