= Grez-sur-Loing =

- Commune
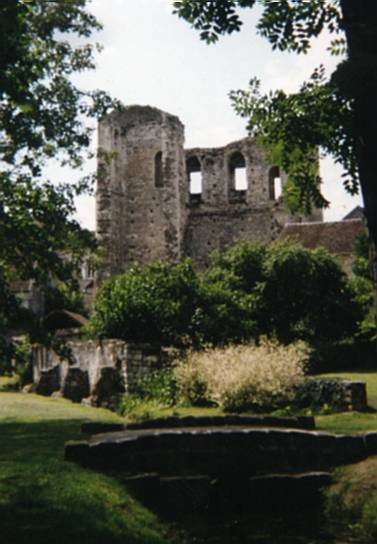
- Ruins of the Tour de Ganne

- Coat of arms
- Location of Grez-sur-Loing
- Location within France Location within Île-de-France (region)
- Coordinates: 48°18′55″N 2°41′20″E
- Country: France
- Region: Île-de-France
- Department: Seine-et-Marne
- Arrondissement: Fontainebleau
- Canton: Nemours

Government
  - Mayor (2020–2026): Jacques Bedossa
- Area^{1}: 12.97 km^{2} (5.01 sq mi)
- Highest elevation: 85 m (279 ft)
- Lowest elevation: 52 m (171 ft)
- Population (2023): 1,432
  - Density: 110.4/km^{2} (286.0/sq mi)
- Time zone: UTC+01:00 (CET)
  - Summer (DST): UTC+02:00 (CEST)
- INSEE/Postal code: 77216 /77880
- ^{1} French Land Register data, which excludes lakes, ponds, glaciers > 1 km^{2} (0.386 sq mi or 247 acres) and river estuaries.

Grez-sur-Loing (French pronunciation: [gʁe syʁ lwɛ̃], literally Grez on Loing; formerly Grès-en-Gâtinais, literally Grès in Gâtinais) is a commune in the Seine-et-Marne department in north-central France. It is 6 km north of Nemours.

== Sights ==
- The Church of Notre-Dame et Saint-Laurent (Church of Our Lady and of Saint Lawrence) was the church of a priory dependent on Saint Peter's Abbey in Sens. It dates from the twelfth century and houses some tombs of the sixteenth century.
- The Tower of Ganne, built by Louis VI the fat in 1127, at the same time as the castle.
- The Old bridge, former bridge of Grez-en-Gâtinais built between the 12th century and the 14th century. Destroyed several times, it was rebuilt identically in 1980.
- Tacot des Lacs (Lakes' crate), a narrow-gauge heritage railway running about lakes on plains of the Loing river.
Sights

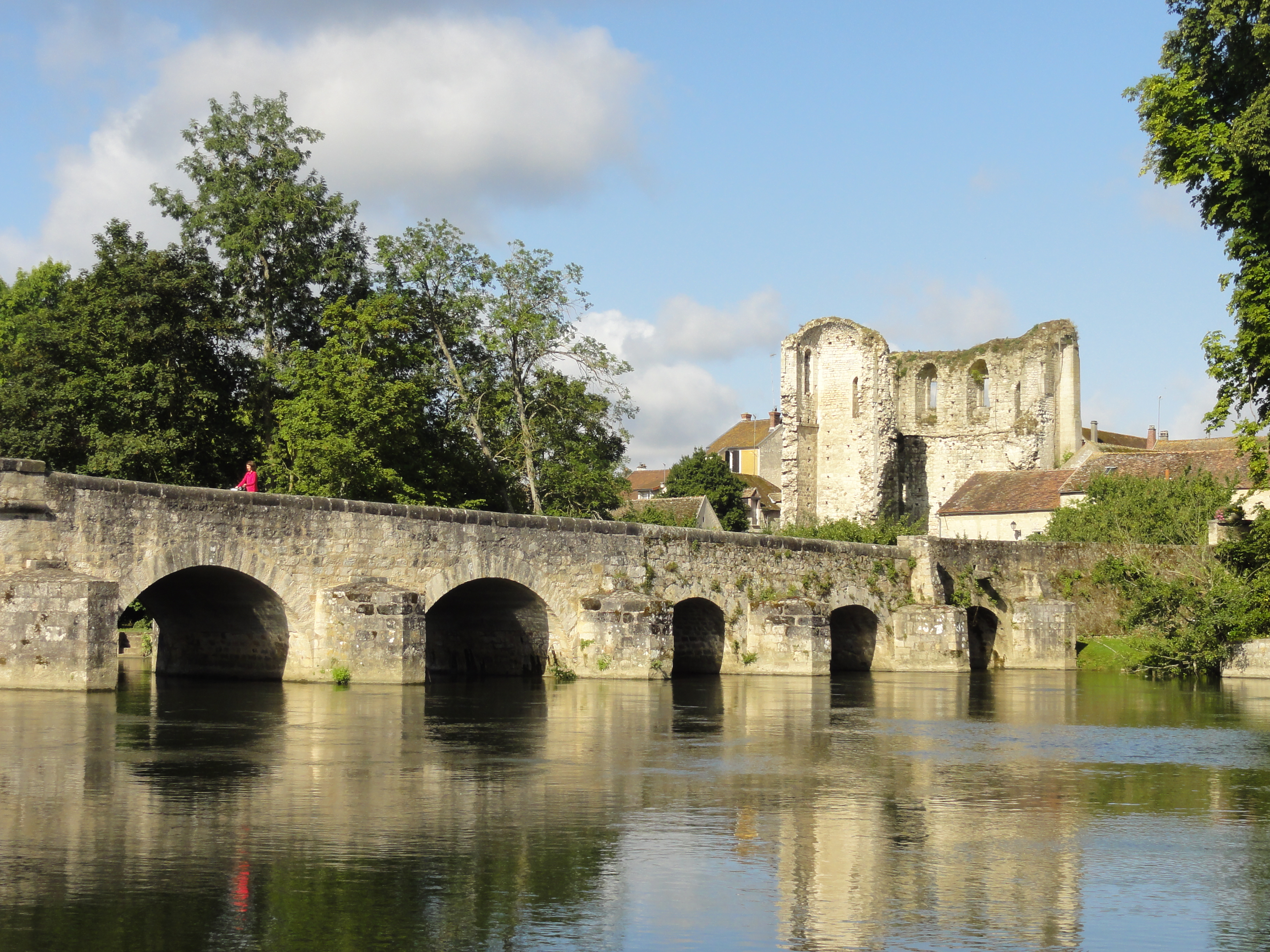
Grez sur Loing

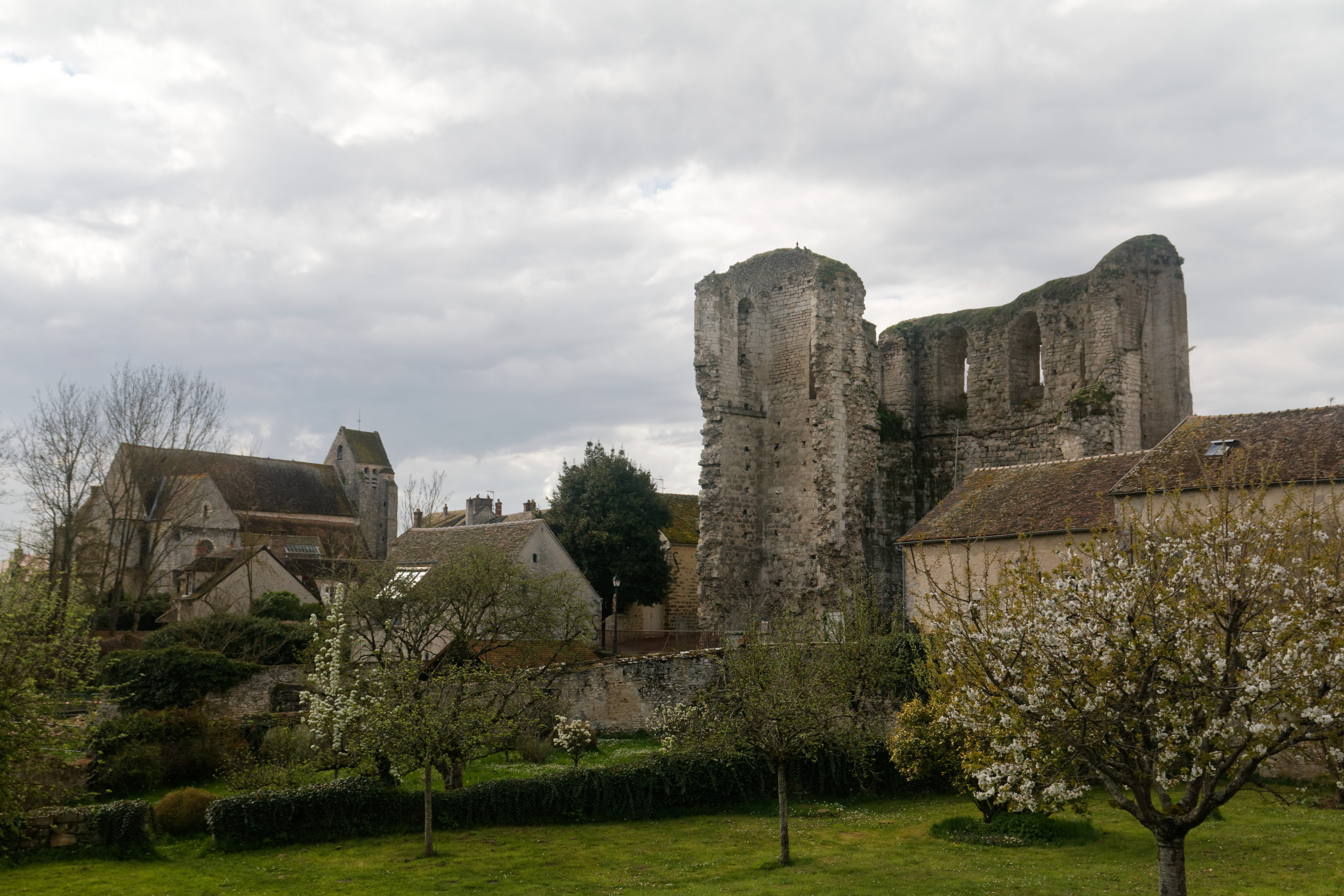
Ganne Tower

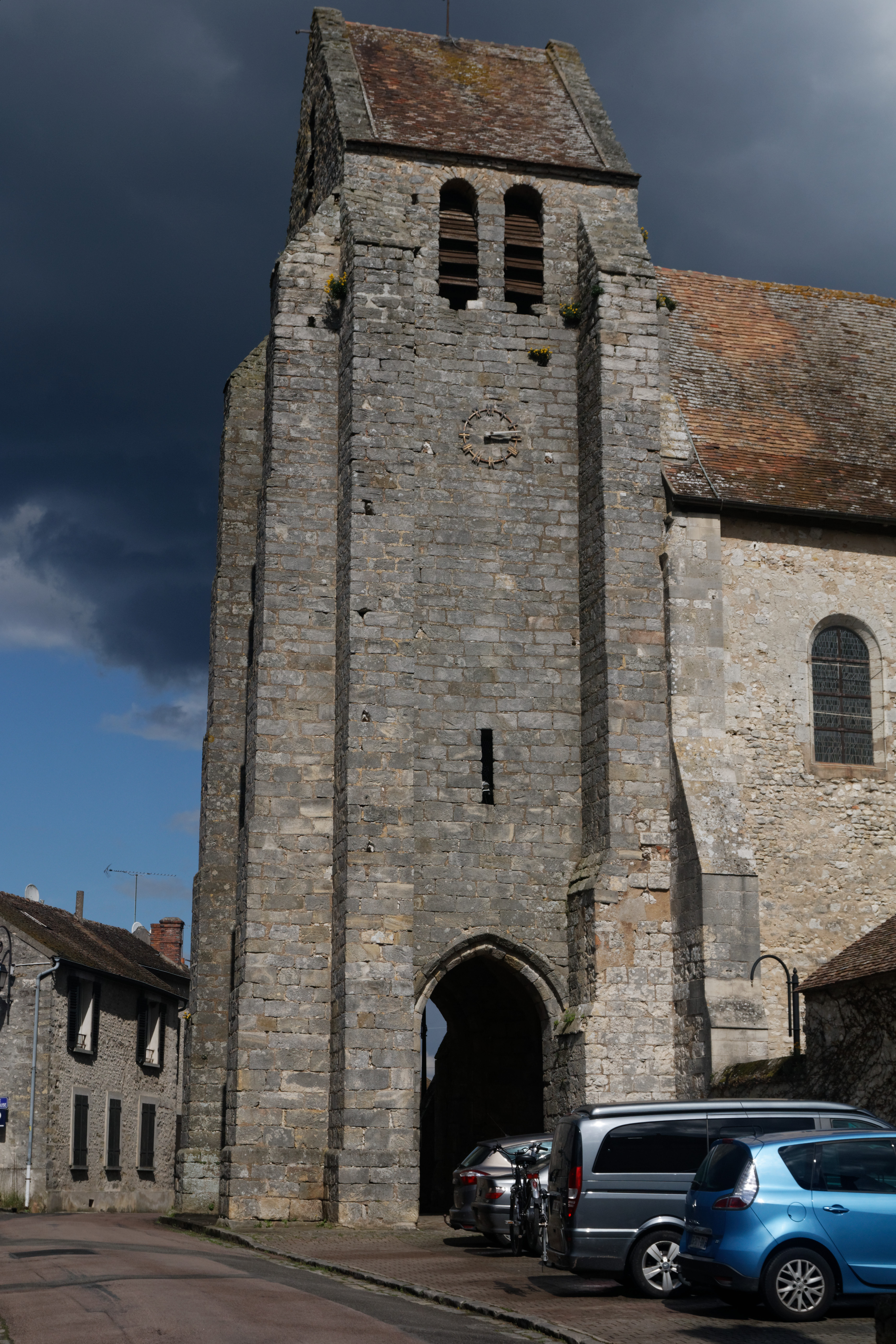
Church of Our Lady and Saint Lawrence

== Transport ==
Grez is on the main D607 road from Fontainebleu to Nemours, and close to the A6 motorway. It is served by the Bourron-Marlotte-Grez railway station.

== Art colony ==
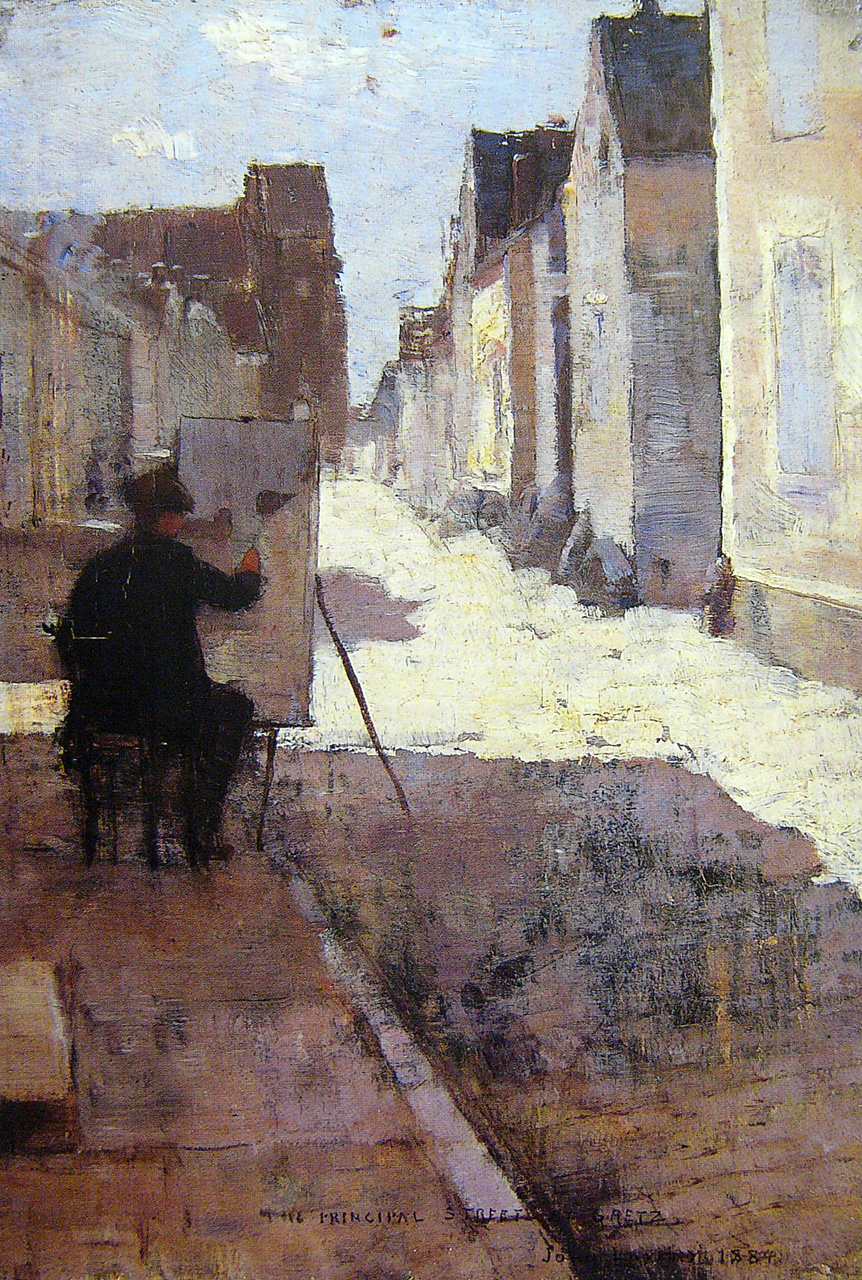
Main street in Grez, by John Lavery

It is located 70 km south of Paris and is notable for the artists and musicians who have lived or stayed there. The painter Fernande Sadler became mayor and encouraged the community gathering paintings and she wrote about the artists there.

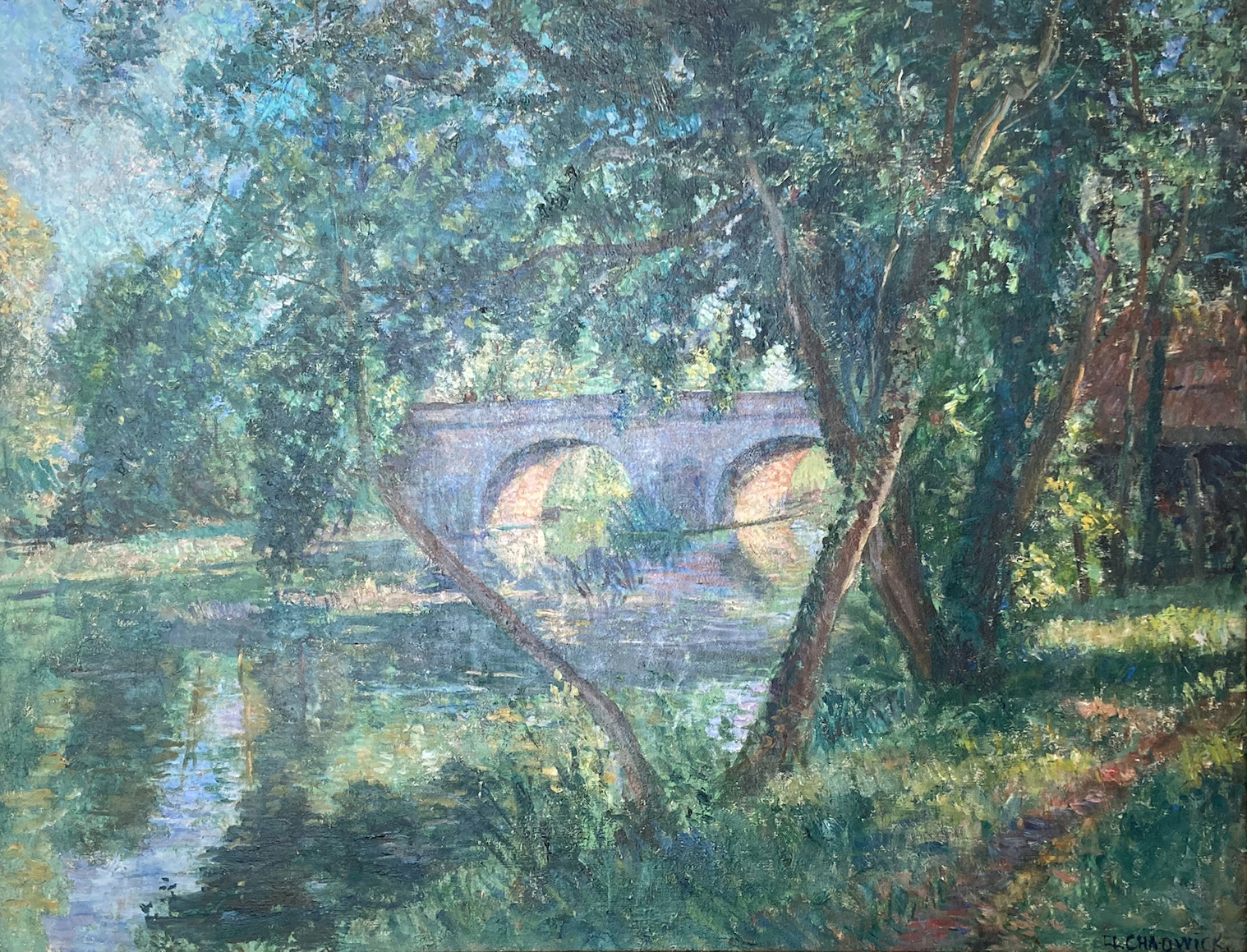
The old Grez-sur-Loing bridge, Emma Löwstädt-Chadwick (1855–1932)

The Swedish artist Carl Larsson met his wife Karin Bergöö while they were both staying at Grez. Others include, Italian artist Francesco Netti, Irish artist Frank O'Meara, Swedish artists Karl Nordström, Emma Chadwick, Julia Beck and Bruno Liljefors as well as writer August Strindberg, the Danish and Norwegian members of the Skagen Painters, and Robert Louis Stevenson. American artists were John Singer Sargent, Francis Brooks Chadwick, Robert Vonnoh, Edward Simmons, Will Hicox Low, Theodore Robinson, Willard Metcalf, Bruce Crane, and Kenyon Cox. Grez is featured in many paintings by the Glasgow Boys, where the bridge over the river is clearly shown. They lived in the village at the turn of the 20th century.

Musicians also migrated to Grez-sur-Loing. The English composer Frederick Delius lived here and dictated a number of works to his amanuensis, Eric Fenby, here. Their house was portrayed in the 1968 Ken Russell film Song of Summer, but it was filmed in England. Delius died in Grez on 10 June 1934. The American soprano and folk song fieldworker Loraine Wyman spent several years here starting in 1928, following her retirement from singing.

== See also ==
- Communes of the Seine-et-Marne department
