= Santa Ana mine (Peru) =

Proposed silver mining project

Santa Ana Silver Project
- Location in Peru
- Location: Huacullani District, Chucuito Province, Puno Region, Peru; 16°39′37″S 69°19′08″W
- Products: Silver
- Opened: Concession cancelled
- Company: Bear Creek Mining Corporation
- Website: http://www.bearcreekmining.com/
- Acquired: 2007

The Santa Ana Silver Project is a proposed open pit silver mining project by the Bear Creek Mining Corporation for the Santa Ana silver deposit in Huacullani District, Chucuito Province, Puno Region in southern Peru. Bear Creek's concession to the mine was revoked in late June 2011.

Bear Creek states that 63.2 million ounces of silver (proven and probable mineral reserves) are at the site, 19.7% of the company's total silver reserves. Of these, 16.6 million ounces are proven, and 46.6 million ounces are probable. Bear Creek proposes to operate the mine for an 11-year period during which it would extract approximately 47.4 million ounces of silver. A possible extension of the mining period could bring an additional 35 million ounces, according to company estimates. Mineral reserves constitute 37 million tons of silver-containing rock; within them, the silver occurs at an average density of 53g of silver per ton of rock. Cyanide, a toxin, would be used to separate the silver from the rock.

Prior to regional protests against mining, construction was scheduled for late 2011 with operations to start in 2012. However, amidst protests in May 2011, the company withdrew its staff until at least after the June 5, 2011, election. Further protests led to the revocation of the mining concession on June 25. The company is currently seeking compensation for the closure of the concession through the International Centre for Settlement of Investment Disputes.

== Proposed operations ==
Bear Creek Mining contracted Ausenco Vector, Independent Mining Consultants, Inc. (IMC), and Resource Development, Inc. to conduct a feasibility study on mining operations for the project. Their proposed operations were summarized in a technical report issued on October 21, 2010. IMC proposed a "conventional open pit" mining plan based on extracting rock using 63-ton-capacity loading trucks. Prior to production, at least 2.97 million tons of rock would be removed. Each year, about 3.6 million tons of rock would be extracted for 9.5 years; an additional 1.7 years would be required to finish processing it. During the extraction process, 1.96 tons of rock will be removed from every ton of ore extracted. The ore will then be crushed to a size of 3/4 inch and sent to a heap leach, where a sodium cyanide solution would be used to extract a silver-zinc precipitate from the rock; this will be smelted on site into mostly silver Dore bars; lead and most zinc will remain unextracted. Mining operations would be contracted to a local company. The feasibility study proposes to supply the water used by the mine from water wells in "a very large alluvial aquifer" connected by a 12-km pipeline and from a river 10 km north of the project.

== Protests ==
The project has been a focus of regional protests in 2011 against proposed mining, led by the Natural Resources Defense Front of the Southern Zone of Puno (Spanish: Frente de Defensa de los Recursos Naturales de la Zona Sur de Puno) and the National Confederation of Peruvian Communities Affeted by Mining (Spanish: Confederación Nacional de Comunidades del Perú Afectadas por la Minería; Conami). Protesters' concerns center on the threat of contamination to surrounding waterways, including Lake Titicaca, to the detriment of fishing and farming. The Defense Front called a two-day general strike in late April 2011, during which a sixty-year-old woman, María Choque Limachi, was fatally wounded by the impact of a tear gas canister shot by police attempting to clear a blockaded bridge. A larger mobilization, called by both organizations began in early May, and lasted throughout May 2011.

The Peruvian government agreed to create a commission representing multiple government agencies concerning mining in Yunguyo and Chucuito provinces. On May 24, Bear Creek announced that this measure would delay construction until 2012 and operations until 2013. On May 28, 2011, Peruvian government negotiators agreed to delay approval of the mine's environmental license for twelve months. Protests resumed on June 8 and spreading across to Puno region to cover a variety of issues. Government negotiations with protesters resulted in five government decrees affecting the region, issued on June 25, including Supreme Decree 032-2011-EM which cancels Bear Creek's concession at Santa Ana and bans mining activities in the Huacullani and Kelluyo Districts of Chucuito Province.

== Legal proceedings ==
On May 13, 2014, the Lima First Constitutional Court rendered its ruling regarding the action brought by Bear Creek Mining against the Peruvian government, challenging the constitutionality of the Supreme Decree N° 032-2011-EM, which rescinded the company's rights to operate on its Santa Ana mineral concessions. The decision states unequivocally and unconditionally that: (1) Bear Creek's constitutional rights were violated; (2) The company's rights are unconditionally returned as stipulated under Supreme Decree N° 083-2007-EM, which originally granted the right to Bear Creek, as a foreign company, to operate the Santa Ana concessions, located within the 50 kilometer border zone of Peru; (3) Bear Creek is recognized as title holder of the Santa Ana's mining concessions and therefore, is enabled to perform all the rights arising from said titles; and (4) The Court reaffirms that the Santa Ana project is in National interest.

Bear Creek has sought compensation for the cancellation of its project by taking the government of Peru before the International Centre for Settlement of Investment Disputes. Oral hearings on the case were held from September 7 to 14, 2016. At the time of the hearings, Bear Creek was seeking $522 million in damages.

== See also ==
- Mining in Peru
- List of mines in Peru
- Zinc mining
