= Mineral industry of Peru =

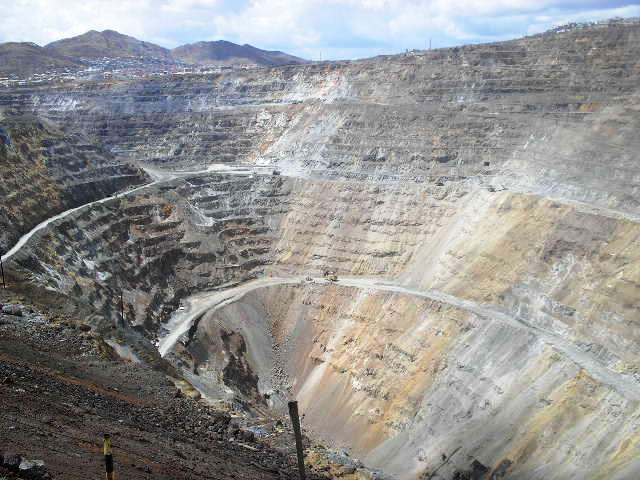
The open pit of Cerro de Pasco silver mine.

The mineral industry of Peru has played an important role in the nation's history and been integral to the country's economic growth for several decades. The industry has also contributed to environmental degradation and environmental injustice; and is a source of environmental conflicts that shape public debate on good governance and development.

In 2019, the country was the 2nd largest world producer of copper, silver, and zinc; 3rd for lead, 4th of tin and molybdenum; 5th for boron; and 8th largest global producer of gold.

In 2006, Peru occupied a leading position in the global production of the following mineral commodities: fourth in arsenic trioxide, third in bismuth, third in copper, fifth in gold, fourth in lead, fourth in molybdenum, fourth in rhenium, first in silver, third in tin, and third in zinc. In Latin America, Peru was the first ranked producer of, in order of value, gold, silver, zinc, lead, tin, and tellurium and the second ranked producer of copper, molybdenum, and bismuth.

In 2006, Peru's economy benefited from high prices for mineral commodities. To date, the government has privatized 220 state-owned firms via joint ventures and consortia in the mining and fuels industries. The firms have generated $9.2 billion, with an additional committed capital flow of about $11.4 billion, representing 17% and 21% of Peru's GDP, respectively. Privatizations and concessions generated a committed investment of $6.9 billion (2006–2010) by mining companies such as Perú Copper Inc., Toromocho copper project ($2.5 billion), Xstrata plc. for Las Bambas copper mine ($1 billion), Phelps Dodge for expansion of Cerro Verde copper mine ($850 million), Monterrico Metals Inc. for Rio Blanco base metals project ($800 million), Rio Tinto Limited for La Granja copper project ($700 million), Southern Copper Corporation for expansion of Ilo smelter ($400 million), Goldfields Ltd. for Cerro Corona copper-gold project ($350 million), and Companhia Vale do Rio Doce for the Bayovar phosphate project ($300 million). The Ministerio de Energía y Minas reported that of the committed investment in 2006, Peru received $1 billion for gas and $200 million for petroleum.

Petróleos del Perú (PETROPERU S.A.) was created on July 24, 1969 (Law No. 17753) as a state-owned entity, dedicated sequentially to the transportation, refining, and commercialization of refined products and other derivatives of petroleum. On June 2, 2004, the Peruvian Congress (law No.28244) excluded PETROPERU S.A. from the privatization process and authorized its participation in the exploration and production of hydrocarbons. The state agency Perupetro S.A. was created on November 18, 1993 (Law No. 26221) to promote investments for hydrocarbon exploration and production in the country. Perupetro negotiates, signs, and administers hydrocarbon contracts, for which PETROPERU must compete with private firms as well. In 2006, PETROPERU invested $4.5 billion in the hydrocarbon sector.

The mineral industry in Peru has also generated controversy. While the mineral industry has spurred national economic growth, it has also produced changes to the environment that compromise rural populations' livelihoods. As a result, there has been a rise in corporate-community conflict between extractive corporations and rural populations, primarily in the form of peasant protests.

== Minerals in the national economy ==
In the 1990s, President Fujimori implemented several market reforms that allowed for the growth of Peru's mineral sector. In 1995, the Fujimori government passed a land law (Law 26505) that granted mining corporations the right to use land for their operations in exchange for monetary compensation to the landowners. In addition, the Fujimori administration installed a new tax regime that exempted mining corporations from taxation and paying royalties until they regained their initial investments. Fujimori also spearheaded other reforms that removed restrictions on profit/capital remittances, eliminated performance requirements for foreign investments, reduced tariffs on imports and removed tariffs on exports, established simpler licensing procedures, modified policies regarding indigenous land tenure, lowered taxes, liberalized the capital market, and privatized state firms and financial institutions. These changes facilitated a dramatic increase in new foreign direct investment (FDI) and allowed entry into the global market. In the period from 1990 to 1998, Peru's exports increased by over 85 percent. Out of this, the mineral industry accounts for 50 percent of Peru's total exports and has played a major role in its national economic growth.

In 2006, the mining and mineral processing industries represented almost 1% of the GDP. The minerals sector employed about 5% (83,000) of the industrial sector's total of 1.7 million miners; this did not include nearly 5,000 active informal miners engaged in illegal mining.

== Government policies and programs ==
Peru's legal framework regarding domestic and foreign investors is governed by Constitutional Mandates as Legislative Decree No. 662 (promotion of foreign investment), which provides unrestricted access to all economic sectors; Legislative Decree No. 757 (framework for the development of private investment), which pertains to private investment growth; and Texto Unico Official (TUO) approved by Supreme Decree No. 059-96-PCM, which promotes private investment in public infrastructure and utility works. Within the framework of Decree Law No. 708 of November 1991 (promotion of investment in mining), Legislative Decree No. 818 of April 1996 (incentives for investing in natural resources), and Supreme Decree No. 162-92-EF of October 1992 (rules guaranteeing foreign investment), more than 250 domestic stability and guarantee contracts have been signed since 1993.

Supreme Decree No. 014-92-EM of June 1992 (the general mining law) and Legislative Decree No. 868 of May 1996 (Texto Unico Official) provide guaranteed protections to mining ventures and contracts under the Peruvian Civil Code. Consequently, such ventures and contracts are immune from unilateral changes by any governmental authority in Peru without an appropriate legal or administrative remedy or arbitration by the Convenio Constitutivo del Centro Internacional de Arreglo de Differencias Relativas an Inversiones (Formal Consent of the International Center for Settlement of Relative Differences on Investments). Additionally, Peru enacted the Supreme Decree No. 047-2002-EF of April 2002 (import duties for capital goods) to reduce the duties paid to 7% from 20% and 12% on capital goods to be used in exploration and production of certain minerals, such as oil and gas in the Amazon region. The capital, goods, and services linked to minerals exploration benefited from the elimination of 18% sales tax when law No. 27623-EF was enacted in January 2002. Supreme Decree No. 015-2004-PGM of January 2004 (legal framework for decentralization) was established to use revenues from mineral production to maximize the well-being of the local communities through economic growth, environmental protection, and social development in a sustainable way. Supreme Decree No. 066-2005-EM of May 2006 (legal framework for creation of the Dirección de Gestión Social) was established to administer the Corporate Social Responsibility program in the mining sector.

The Peruvian Constitution establishes equal protection for domestic and foreign investors who may enter into agreements with the Government and guarantees free access, possession, and disposal of foreign currency. Hydrocarbon Law No. 26844 of May 1997 eliminated the exclusive rights of the state-owned Petróleos del Perú S.A. to control the secondary recovery of crude oil, refining, and imports and subsequent resale of petroleum and byproducts. The Peruvian laws have attempted to ensure more-favorable minerals and crude oil and gas exploration and production contract terms for investors. Legal procedures to obtain mining rights were made easier by the enactment of complementary legislation Supreme Decree No. 018 of July 9, 1992. The Government relinquished exclusive control over exploration, mining, smelting, and refining of metals and fuel minerals. Individuals and private companies are allowed to hold mining permits in Peru. In the legal framework for investment and taxation, no distinction is made among domestic and foreign investors, corporations, joint ventures, and consortia formed in Peru or abroad. Municipalities and Regional governments in areas where mineral resources (metals and industrial minerals) are exploited will receive 50% of the taxes collected to be invested in education and social programs (health, housing, and others) in conformance with the Canon Minero (Ministry Resolution No. 266-2002-EF/15 of May 1, 2002). The remittance of dividends, depreciation, and royalties abroad has no restrictions. Contracts can be signed by investors, and the Government guarantees the stability of legal commitments and taxes. To increase protection of investors’ interests, Peru signed agreements with the World Bank's Multilateral Investment Guarantee Agency in April 1991, which was authorized by Legislative Decree No. 25312 and with the Overseas Private Investment Corporation in December 2002, which was authorized by Legislative Decree No. 25809.

The Dirección General de Asuntos Ambientales (DGAA) of the Ministerio de Energía y Minas (MEM) is responsible for addressing environmental problems that result from energy and mining activities and is mandated to implement the laws and regulations of the environmental legal framework, such as Legislative Decree No. 613 of September 1990 (the environmental code) and Supreme Decree No. 016-93-EM of April 28, 1993 (the environmental regulation). The sustainable development model for the mining and energy sectors began in 1993 with regulations and procedures for the gradual reduction of pollution, which include economic development policies and environmental protection. The mining industry must comply by adjusting its ongoing operations to permissible effluent levels and its new operations by using cleaner technologies. The DGAA evaluates and proposes the environmental regulations for the mining and energy sectors, which include the maximum emission levels that are compatible with the internationally accepted limits set by the United Nations and the World Bank, approves environmental impact assessments for new operations and environmental adjustment and management programs for ongoing ones, and administers the national environmental information system. The MEM is authorized to manage environmental affairs in the minerals sector, such as establishing the environmental protection policy and maximum allowable levels for effluents, signing environmental administrative stability agreements, overseeing the impact of operations determining responsibilities, and imposing administrative sanctions. The oil companies, in particular, are under pressure because the number of operations in the Amazon Rainforest, one of the world's most sensitive ecosystems, is increasing.

== Production ==
In 2006, the value of Peruvian minerals (metals, industrial minerals, and fuels) production amounted to $6.5 billion, compared with $5.1 billion in 2005. Mining and fuel production increased by 8.1% as a result of larger values of metals (7%) and fuel output (23%). The increase in mineral outputs (content) was mainly led by natural gas (77%), molybdenum (22%), gold (20%), crude oil (18%), and iron (8%), and to a lesser extent by silver and lead (4% each) compared with 2005 outputs. In 2006, metal prices were also driven upwards because of the higher consumption associated with increased world economic activity, such as in China, the United States, and other countries.

Metal production growth was mainly led by an increase in copper, iron, silver, and lead, which offset the decreased output of gold, molybdenum, and zinc. The hydrocarbon sector's output also increased due to the increased extraction of natural gas at Aguaytía and Camisea. Crude oil output was expected to increase as the result of the 16 new oil exploration and production contracts signed in 2006.

== Structure of the mineral industry ==
Peruvian laws have attempted to ensure equitable mineral, crude oil, and gas exploration and production. Owing to these terms, an increased number of domestic and foreign companies, AngloGold Ashanti, Barrick Gold, BHP Billiton, Cambior, Falconbridge, Mitsui & Co, Mitsubishi, Peñoles, Teck Cominco, and others, have expressed interest in participating in prospecting, exploration, production, and distribution of natural gas and petroleum contracts with Perupetro and mineral properties with Centromín. The structure of the Peruvian mineral industry continued to change as a result of privatizations and joint-venture projects. The establishment of consortia in such deregulated industries as oil and gas, and joint ventures in energy and mining projects were becoming a common practice in Peru. According to the Ministerio de Energía y Minas, Peru was the seventh most attractive area for investments in exploration after, in order of investment attractiveness ranking, Tasmania (Australia), Nevada and Alaska (USA), Northwest Territories (Canada), Western Australia, and Indonesia.

The new operating process, which was the result of the privatization and joint-venture projects, incorporated policies that deal with economic and societal development issues and with environmental protection in a sustainable way. Private local interests owned most of the medium- and small-sized mining operations. More than 250 foreign mining companies have been established in Peru since 1990. Crude oil was transported through 1,754 km pipelines, natural gas and natural gas liquids through 983 km dual pipelines, and refined products through 13 km pipelines. Important mineral industry ports included Callao, Chimbote, Ilo, Matarani, Paita, Puerto Maldonado, Salaverry, San Martin, San Nicolas, and Talara on the Pacific Ocean and Iquitos Pucallpa and yurimaguas on the Amazon River and its tributaries. Peru had an installed electrical generating capacity of 5,050 megawatts (MW), about 80% of which was accounted for by hydroelectric plants. The Peruvian Government raised about $2 billion from the privatization of its electrical sector and committed to an investment of about $20 million to install an additional 1,006 MW of capacity in the immediate future. The energy mix, by source, was hydro (74.5%), fossil fuel (24.5%), and others (1.0%).

== Mineral trade ==
Peru's mining industry, which has consistently been the country's major foreign exchange generator since 1997, accounted for almost 61.8% ($14.7 billion) of total export revenues of more than $23.8 billion in 2006, compared with 56.3% ($9.8 billion) of total export revenues of about $17.4 billion in 2005. In 2006, Peru's total trade balance recorded a surplus of about $8.9 billion, compared with $5.3 billion in 2005, which increased by almost 68% compared with 6.6% in 2005. Peru's minerals sector had a trade surplus of $16.2 billion compared with $11 billion in 2005.

In 2006, mining was the main exporting sector of the country. Price increases for zinc (136.5%), copper (82.6%), and gold (36%) played an essential role in the Peruvian trade balance. Almost 82% of the total minerals exported ($14.7 billion) were copper ($6 billion), gold ($4 billion), and zinc ($2 billion). Peru's other mineral exports were molybdenum ($838 million), lead ($713 million), silver ($479 million), tin ($332 million), and iron ($256 million).

Peru's fourth major traditional export, petroleum and derivatives, amounted to $1.6 billion in 2006 compared with $1.5 million in 2005. Peru's total mineral exports, which included petroleum and derivatives, amounted to more than 68% of its total exports in 2006. Total mineral imports, which were mostly petroleum and derivatives, however, increased by about 34.8% to $3.1 billion compared with $2.3 billion in 2005. Total imports increased by about 21.5% to $14.7 billion compared with $12.1 billion in 2005 and generated a surplus of $2.6 billion compared with $5.3 billion in 2005. In 2006, the United States (34%), China (11%), Chile (7%), Canada (6%), and Japan (5%) were Peru's leading mineral consumers. The United States, China, and Chile were the main importers of gold, copper, and molybdenum, respectively. Peru sold about 6% of its exports to other members of the Mercado Común Andino (ANCOM), whose members were Bolivia, Colombia, Ecuador, Peru, and Venezuela; about 3% was sold to the Mercado Común del Cono Sur (MERCOSUR) countries of Argentina, Brazil, Paraguay, and Uruguay, and associate members Bolivia and Chile; and 15% was sold to other Latin American countries. Peruvian mineral exports could increase if the negotiations between ANCOM and MERCOSUR lead to a South American free trade agreement and owing to the free trade agreement signed recently (2006) between the United States and Peru.

== Commodity review ==
=== Metals ===
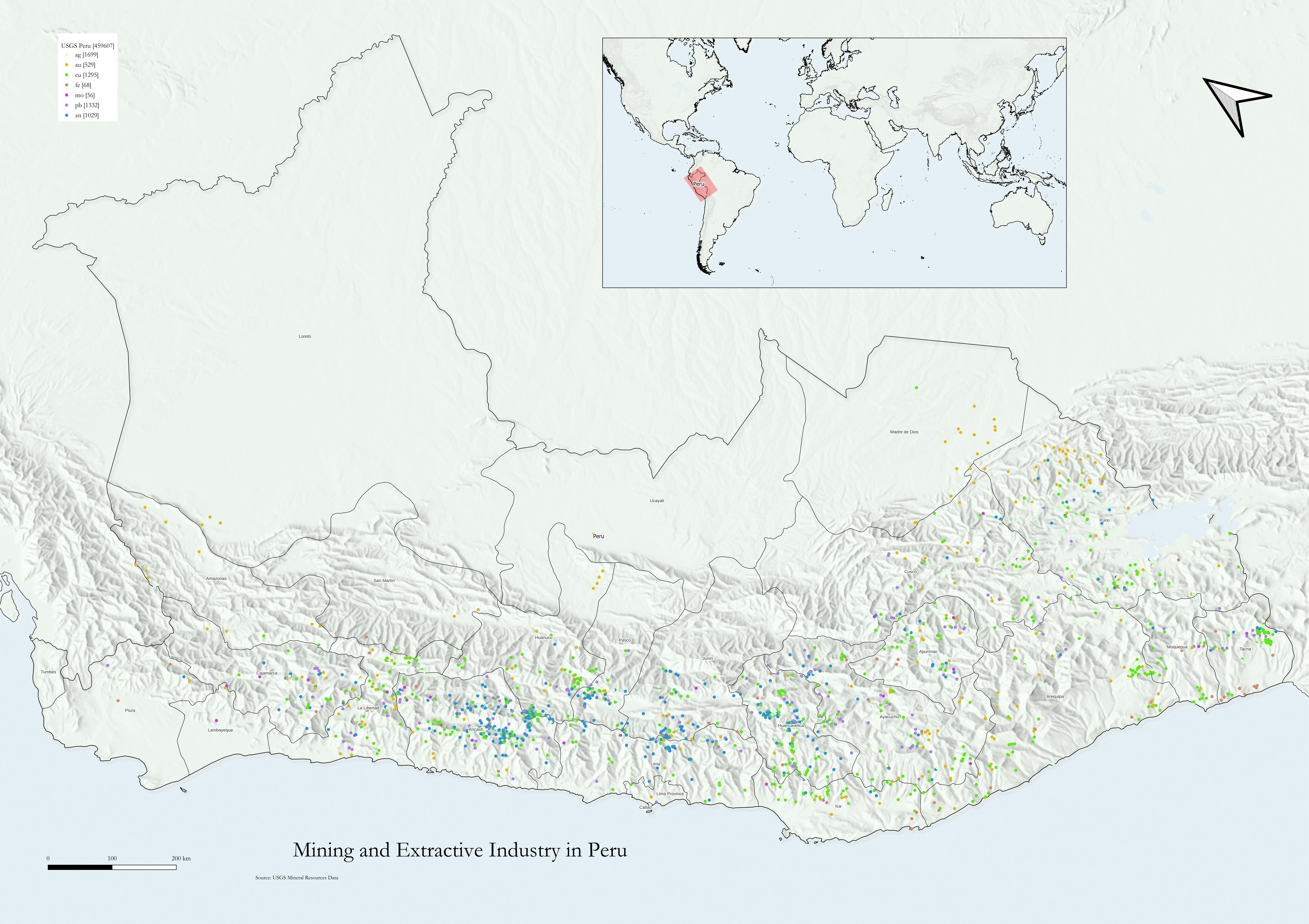
Map showing mines in Peru categorised by mineral from the USGS Mineral Resources dataset

Peru's principal metalliferous commodities are copper, gold, iron, Lead, silver, zinc and tin.

==== Copper ====
Peru's copper output (Cu content) in 2006 was about 1.05 million metric tons (Mt) compared with almost 1.01 Mt in 2005, an increase of almost 4%. The country's copper metal exports in 2006 totaled about 986,600 metric tons (t) valued at $6 billion, compared with 984,200 t valued at $3.4 billion in 2005; this value was 76.5% higher than that of 2005 as a result of the copper price increase to $2.829 per pound of copper in 2006 from $1.549 per pound in 2005.

Owing to China's increasing consumption of metals and minerals such as copper, which was expected to increase to 6 Mt by 2010 from 4 Mt in 2005, two Chinese companies, Baosteel Co., Ltd. (Baosteel) and Aluminum Corp. of China Ltd. (Chalco) were planning to have joint ventures with Latin America's leading copper mining companies such as Companhia Vale do Rio Doce (CVRD) of Brazil, Corporación Nacional del Cobre (Codelco) of Chile, and Sociedad Minera Cerro Verde S.A.A. of Peru. China Minmetals Corp. planned to invest in metals and minerals mainly in Brazil, Chile, and Peru. In 2006, Peru's planned investments of $2.8 billion were expected in projects with advanced exploration and environmental assessment work, such as in Las Bambas copper mine ($1.5 billion) and Los Chancas ($1.3 billion) copper deposits located in the Department of Apurimac and owned by Xstrata plc. of Switzerland and Southern Copper Corp. a subsidiary of Grupo Mexico S.A. de C.V., respectively. Other investments in copper deposits included Rio Blanco Copper S.A.’s Rio Blanco deposit located in the Department of Piura ($1.5 billion to produce copper by 2008), Perú Copper Inc.’s Toromocho deposit located in the Department of Junin ($1.5-$2.0 billion, reserves 1.6 billion metric tons), Southern Copper was planning to invest $600 million in additional exploration and to improve efficiencies in Cuajone and Toquepala copper mines, and Sociedad Minera Cerro Verde SA was planning to increase Cerro Verde Mine's copper output to 300,000 metric tons per year (t/yr) from 100,000 t/yr with an investment of $890 million by 2006–07. Other mineral prospects included the San Gregorio zinc project of Sociedad Minera El Brocal S.A.A. located in the Department of Cerro de Pasco, the Minas Carachugo gold-and-silver project of Minera Yanacocha S.R.L. (MyS) Newmont Mining Corp. of the United States (51.35%), Compañía de Minas Buenaventura S.A.A. (43.65%), and World Bank International Finance Corporation (5%)] located in the Department of Cajamarca, and the Magistral copper-molybdenum-silver project of Inca Pacific Resources located in the Department of Ancash. Magistral is located in the same geologic trend as that of Compañía Minera Antamina S.A.'s (CMA) Antamina base-metal.

CMA's Antamina Mine was the leading copper concentrate producer in the country with a total output of 390,800 t in 2006 compared with 383,000 t in 2005. SPCC was the second leading producer of copper in the country with an output of 362,000 t in 2006 compared with 355,000 t in 2005. BHP Billiton Tintaya S.A. reported an output of 79,000 t of copper concentrate in 2006 compared with 78,300 t in 2005. SPCC reported 35,800 t of cathode copper from Toquepala mine, which was produced by solvent extraction-electrowinning (SX-EW). Copper metal output at its Ilo refinery located in the Department of Moquegua was 273,100 t compared with 285,200 t in 2005. Cerro Verde's SX-EW plant at the Cerro Verde copper mine produced 96,500 t of cathode compared with 93,500 t in 2005.

==== Gold ====
In 2006, gold output was 202.8 t compared with 208 t in 2005, a decrease of 2.5%. MyS produced 81.2 t compared with 103.2 t in 2005. Other leading gold producers were Minera Barrick Misquichilca S.A. (51.9 t), Madre de Dios S.A (15.8 t), Compañía de Minas Buenaventura S.A.A. (7.9 t), and Aruntani S.A.C. (6.5 t). Gold exports in 2006 totaled about 6,702.1 ounces [Note there is a major discrepancy in the 202.8 t (= 7,150,000 ounces)and the 6,702 ounces listed in this sentence] valued at $4 billion compared with 7,036.8 ounces valued at $3.2 billion in 2005; this value was 25% higher than that of 2005 as a result of the gold price increase to $605 per troy ounce in 2006 from $445 per troy ounce in 2005.

Gold recovered as a byproduct from the concentrates of Peru's polymetallic mines amounted to 2.6 t. From the total gold output in 2006, large, medium, and small producers reported 187 t and an unknown amount of placer mining and "garimperos" (informal individual miners) reported 15.8 t. Placers accounted for almost 8% of the gold produced in the country. The southeastern Andes have well known gold placers on the Inambari River and its tributaries. Placer gold was produced mostly in the Inca and the Mariategui Regions and from rivers and streams throughout the jungle. Goldfields Limited, the world's fourth ranked gold producer, entered into a joint venture with Compañía de Minas Buenaventura S.A.A. to start operations in the Puquio gold project in the Department of Ayacucho in the third quarter of 2007. Goldfields Limited is also looking into the Cerro Corona gold project in the Department of Cajamarca.

==== Iron ore ====
Shougang Hierro Perú S.A.A. (a subsidiary of China's Shougang Corporation) continued to be Peru's sole iron ore producer in the Marcona District, in the Department of Ica. Mine output increased to 4.8 Mt of iron content in 2006 from 4.6 Mt in 2005. The iron ore exports amounted to 6.7 Mt at a value of $256 million compared with 6.6 Mt at a value of $216.1 million in 2005, which was an increase of 18.5% in value compared with 2005. The domestic consumption amounted to 300,000 t of iron ore, which remained about the same level as that of 2005. Iron ore production increased in response to higher demand in China and other economies in the Asian region for construction and higher steel output, which had a positive effect on higher molybdenum production as well. The Marcona Mine as of 2010 continued to be plagued by labor troubles, with many workers feeling that their work was directly benefiting China, not Peru. Despite these issues, the mine continued ambitious plans for expanded production of 18 million tons of iron ore per annum by 2012.

==== Lead, silver, and zinc ====
In spite of higher demand for zinc by Asian countries and higher international prices in 2006, the Peruvian zinc industry produced 1.2 Mt of zinc in concentrates, which remained about the same level as that of 2005. Of the total output, the main producers’ contributions were, in order of tonnage, Volcan (232,645 t), Empresa Minera Los Quenuales S.A. (199,600 t), CMA (178,180 t), Compañía Minera Milpo S.A. (79,600 t), El Brocal (69,800 t), Empresa Administradora Chungar S.A.C. (62,230 t), Atacocha (59,800 t), and others (320,000 t).

The country's total silver content output increased to more than 3,471 t compared with 3,206 t in 2005. Peru, for the third time, surpassed Mexico's silver output of 3,000 t in 2006. In silver output, companies, such as Aruntani, El Brocal, Compañía de Minas Buenaventura S.A.A., and Volcan Compañía Minera S.A.A. were more active, and silver production was higher than last year because Minera yanacocha S.R.L. and medium-sized gold-silver mines exceeded their initial production goals. yanacocha increased its output mainly as a result of technological innovations in its gold-silver recovery process. Higher international prices allowed medium-sized mines and small producers to mine lower grade ores. Peru produced more than 313,300 t of lead in concentrates compared with about 319,400 t in 2005. Exports of zinc, lead, and silver were valued at about $2 billion, $713 million, and $479 million, respectively, compared with $805 million, $491 million, and $281 million in 2005, respectively.

In 2005, Volcan was the first ranked zinc producer in the country with an output of 232,645 t of zinc, 65,540 t of lead, and 413.5 t of silver from its operations in the Cerro de Pasco property located in the Department of Cerro de Pasco, and the San Cristobal, Carahuacra, and Andaychahua base-metal mines located in the Department of Junin. Empresa Minera Los Quenuales S.A. was the second ranked zinc producer from its operations in Casapalca and Iscaycruz Mines, which produced 199,540 t of zinc, 21,600 t of lead, and 183.4 t of silver from the Iscaycruz, the Pachangara, and the Yauliyacu mines. CMA was the third ranked zinc producer from its operations in the Antamina Mine, which produced 178,180 t of zinc and 301.5 t of silver (Ministerio de Energía y Minas, 2007a). Refined metals were reported by Doe Run Peru (120,300 t of lead, 1,145 t of silver, and 41,000 t of zinc from the La Oroya complex); by Sociedad Minera Refinería de Zinc Cajamarquilla S.A. (31.5 t of silver and 134,240 t of zinc from the Cajamarquilla refinery); and by SPCC (119.2 t of silver from its refining operations in Ilo). Peru's silver metal production increased to 1,300 t from 1,230 t in 2005.

In the mining sector, the Grupo Votorantim Metais S.A. of Brazil acquired 99% of the Cajamarquilla refinery for about $210 million and was planning to increase its zinc output to 260,000 t/yr from 130,000 t/yr with an additional investment of $200 million by 2007–08.

==== Tin ====
Production from Minsur's San Rafael Mine located in the Mariátegui Region was 38,470 t in concentrate in 2006 compared with 42,145 t in 2005. Minsur's tin smelting and refining operations in Pisco, located south of Lima, produced 40,500 t of metal compared with 36,700 t in 2005. Peru continued to be the leading tin producer in Latin America followed by Bolivia and Brazil. Minsur, which was the only fully integrated tin supplier in Peru, produced 15.5% of world's output and exported 38,100 t valued at $332.1 million in 2006 compared with 36,900 t valued at $270.0 million in 2005.

=== Industrial minerals ===
Empresa Minera Regional Grau Bayóvar S.A.’s phosphate deposits (Bayóvar project) produced 38,000 t of phosphate ore, which was about the same level as that of 2005. The 90,000-t/yr phosphate plant that was operated by Grau Bayóvar produced 17,100 t of phosphate (P2 O5) in 2006. The Bayóvar project comprises 150,000 hectares of phosphate and brine and has proven reserves of 820 Mt of phosphatic rock equivalent to 260 Mt of rock phosphate with a P_{2}O_{5} content of 30%. CVRD won an international bid on March 16, 2005, to explore further the Bayóvar phosphate deposit. The feasibility study to produce about 3.3 Mt/yr was expected to be completed in the second quarter of 2007.

=== Mineral fuels ===
==== Coal ====
Peru's largest coal deposits were at Alto Chicama located in La Libertad Region. Other coal deposits occur in the Cuenca del Santa in the Marañón Region and the coal basins of Goyllarisquizga and Hatun Huasi in the Cáceres Region of central Peru. In 2006, Peru's recoverable coal reserves were estimated to be 1.1 billion metric tons, and coal production was relatively small (about 29,535 t) compared with an estimated consumption of more than 1.3 Mt/yr.

==== Natural gas and petroleum ====
In 2006, Peru's recoverable (proven and probable) and possible crude oil, liquefied natural gas (LNG), and natural gas resources were estimated to be 6,239,100,000 barrels (991,940,000 m^{3}); LNG 1,373,800 bbl (218,420 m^{3}); and natural gas 859 billion cubic meters (30.4 trillion cubic feet), respectively. The leading gasfields were the Aguaytia, which is located about 41 km west-northwest of Pucallpa and had proven reserves of 8.5 billion cubic meters (301 billion cubic feet) of gas and 9,000 bbl (1,400 m^{3}) of natural gas liquids (NGL) and the Camisea gasfields in the Ucayali Basin with 250 billion cubic meters (8.7 trillion cubic feet), which included 600,000 bbl (95,000 m^{3}) of NGL. Natural gas production increased to 1,775 million cubic meters from 1,517 million cubic meters in 2005 and was produced by Pluspetrol S.A. (59%), Aguaytia S.A. (22%), Petrotech del Perú S.A. (8%), Petróleo Brasileiro S.A. (Petrobrás) (6%), and others (5%). Petrobrás through Petrobrás Energía S.A. acquired exploration and production rights for natural gas and petroleum in Lots 57 and X, respectively.

The Camisea Project encompasses three segments—Upstream, Transportation, and Distribution of natural gas from the Camisea field, which is located in the Ucayali Basin in the Department of Cusco. Under the license contract, the Upstream Consortium holds the rights to produce natural gas and liquids in block 88 for 40 years. Investments to develop and produce, transport, and distribute natural gas from the Camisea field were estimated as follows: the Upstream Project to develop and produce natural gas, $550 million; the Transportation Project to transport natural gas and liquids to Lima through pipelines, $820 million; and the Distribution Project for the distribution network in Lima, $170 million.

In 2006, crude oil production increased to 77,500 barrels per day (12,320 m^{3}/d) from 75,400 bbl/d (11,990 m^{3}/d) in 2005, an increase of almost 3%. Production of petroleum derivatives decreased to 165,220 bbl/d (26,268 m^{3}/d) from 176,411 bbl/d (28,047.1 m^{3}/d) in 2005, a decrease of more than 6%. Peru imported an average of 121,400 bbl/d (19,300 m^{3}/d) crude oil and petroleum products to satisfy its internal consumption of 155,800 bbl/d (24,770 m^{3}/d). Peru's total crude oil production of 28,300 bbl (4,500 m^{3}) in 2006 came from Pluspetrol S.A. (59.6%), Petrobrás (16.7%), Petrotech (14.2%), and others (9.5%) (table 1; Ministerio de Energía y Minas, 2007b). Almost 60% of the country's crude oil production came from the jungle blocks in the Loreto and the Ucayali Regions; the remainder was produced at the coastal and offshore fields in Talara. The country's proven petroleum reserves were estimated to be about 355,000,000 barrels (56,400,000 m^{3}).

In 2006, the largest oil refinery continued to be Petroperú's La Pampilla, which had a designed capacity of about 100,000 bbl/d (16,000 m^{3}/d). The second largest oil refinery was Petroperú's Talara, which had a designed capacity of about 70,000 bbl/d (11,000 m^{3}/d). Other refineries had the following designed capacities: Conchan, 20,000 bbl/d (3,200 m^{3}/d); Iquitos, 10,500 bbl/d (1,670 m^{3}/d); Pucallpa, 3,500 bbl/d (560 m^{3}/d); and El Milagro, 2,500 bbl/d (400 m^{3}/d). Refinery production came from La Pampilla (47%), Talara (38%), Conchán (7%), Iquitos (5%), Pucallpa (2%), and Milagro (1%).

== Controversy ==
=== Environmental impacts and social protest ===
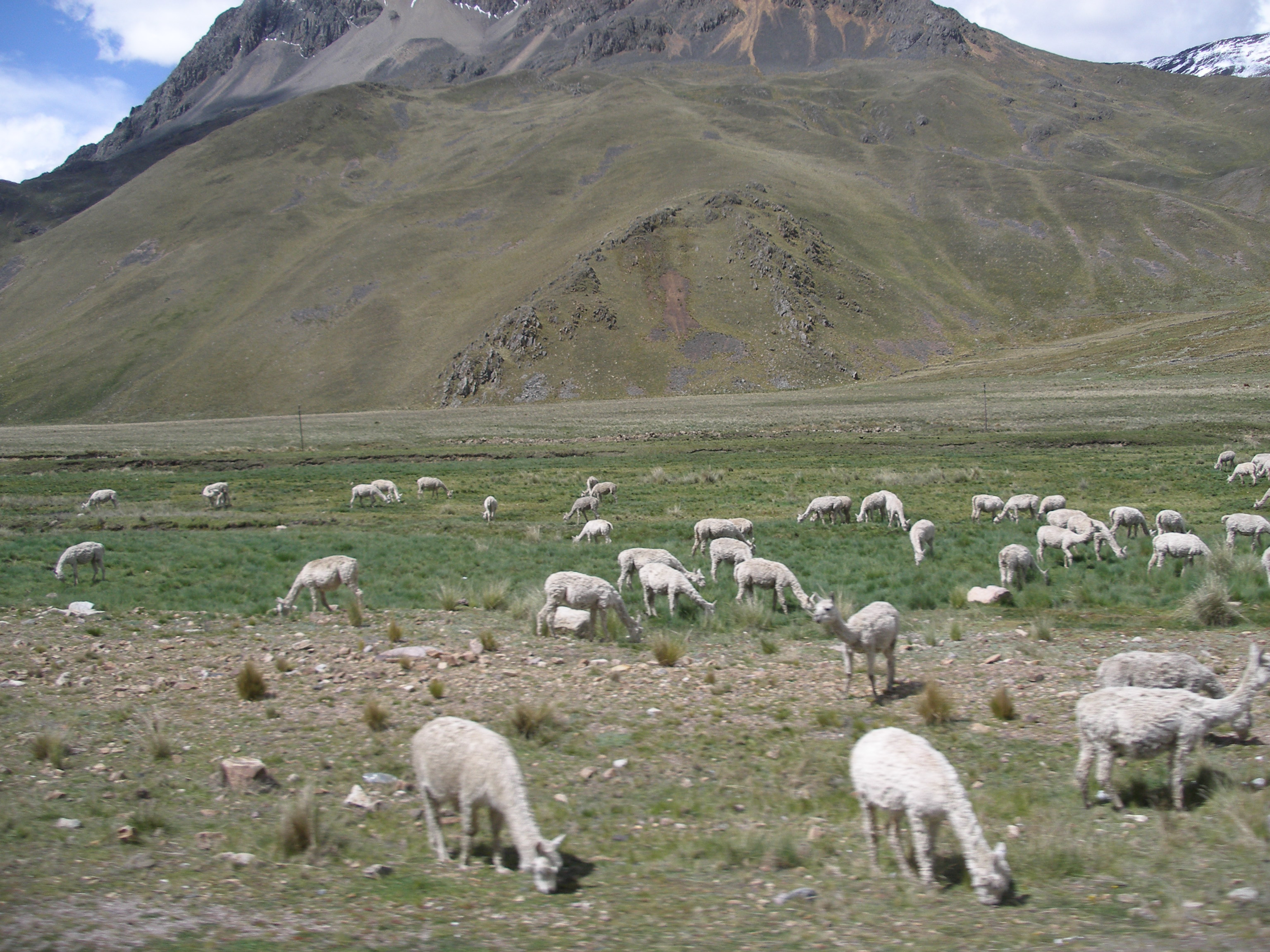
Rural communities in Peru depend on grazing lands for herding and livestock activities

The mineral industry in Peru has exerted several adverse impacts on the environment, including reduced quality and quantity of water supplies and changes in habitat for plants and animals. According to an article in the Journal of Latin American Geography, these effects have significantly compromised the livelihoods of rural populations living in nearby communities. Mining corporations often draw water from nearby streams, canals, aquifers, and lakes, thereby reducing the quantity of water available for subsistence agriculture, farming, and personal consumption. Runoff from mining operations often contaminates local water supplies with substances such as copper, iron, zinc, manganese, mercury, arsenic, lead, cadmium, cyanide, and selenium, further threatening rural populations' main sources of sustenance. Beyond modifying water supplies, the mineral industry in Peru has also compromised natural habitat. Mining operations often produce substantial soil erosion, thus degrading the grazing lands that local populations rely on for herding and livestock activities. In addition, mining activities require considerable physical space for infrastructure, road construction, drilling, and other operations. This reduces the quantity of land available for the pastoral activities of rural communities.

The environmental changes generated by Peru's mineral industry have given rise to significant corporate-community conflict in the form of peasant protests. According to the Community Development Journal, community members often resort to violence as a means of having their voices heard. One notable example took place in 2004. For months, community members expressed verbal opposition against the activities of Buenaventura's gold mine La Zanja. After corporate and government authorities failed to acknowledge their concerns, community members responded by occupying Buenaventura's premises and burning much of its property. In September 2017, people from the town of Cerro de Pasco marched 240 km (150 mi) to Lima to protest an open-pit mine at Cerro de Pasco, operated by a subsidiary of Volcan Compañía Minera, and one of the worst lead-poising clusters in the world. The townspeople sought to call attention to the 2,070 children living in the area with extremely dangerously high blood levels of lead, above 10 micrograms per deciliter.

==== Environmental Justice Implications ====
Mining companies which are typically operated by US companies have caused pollution that have affected many local communities and ecosystems. For example, in Tacna and Moquegua regions, Southern Copper dumped 785 million metric tons of waste into the Ite Bay which damaged the critical fishing areas that many local communities relied on. Other examples include the Mosaic Company's Miski Mayo phosphate mine which was responsible for killing off livestock pasture and trees. These mining companies are not being held responsible for their poor waste management, and instead the local communities around them are facing the burdens due to the environmental harm being caused. To make matters worse, these local communities, mainly indigenous communities rely on the environment around them for sustenance. Water and air pollution is leading to health concerns in the surrounding mining areas. In Cerro de Pasco, Peru mining activities are heavily practiced in which these communities have been exposed and endured various health consequences ranging from chronic to fatal diseases. The World Health Organization has concluded through repeated environmental samplings that the heavy metals found in the water exceed the safety limits. Overall, a stronger governance system is needed to monitor mining activities in the area to make sure they are not harming the environment and the people around it.

=== Compensation ===
Mineral industry corporations use territory occupied by indigenous populations to carry out their operations. In the process, they compromise land and water resources, taking away the community's livelihood assets and sources of cultural identity. Corporations attempt to compensate for these changes through the price they pay for using the land, offering employment to the local population, and implementing community development programs.

==== Land use ====
In exchange for using land for mining operations, corporations pay royalties to the Peruvian government. Peruvian law requires that a portion of these royalties be returned to the communities and households that the mining operations directly affect. Due to political corruption, however, these royalties often fail to be redistributed to local communities. This lack of financial compensation has been a major source of corporate-community conflict and peasant protests in Peru's mineral industry.

==== Employment ====
While corporations state that mining operations will provide greater employment opportunities for the local population, many of their employees come from outside of the immediate area. In many cases, the employees are drawn from outside of the region in which the mining operations take place or outside of the country. This is because the mineral corporations require individuals with advanced skills to fill their positions. Thus, while Peru's mineral industry allows for greater employment at the national level, it often generates corporate-community conflict on a local scale. According to the Journal of Latin American Geography, members of rural communities often report that there is a lack of employment opportunities available at the mining sites and vocalize their frustration over the fact that a large proportion of the mine's employees come from outside of the local area. Despite such frustrations, mining corporations do offer some employment to individuals from surrounding rural communities. According to the World Development Journal, this has produced community-level tensions due to growing inequalities within the middle and upper-middle classes.

==== Community development programs ====
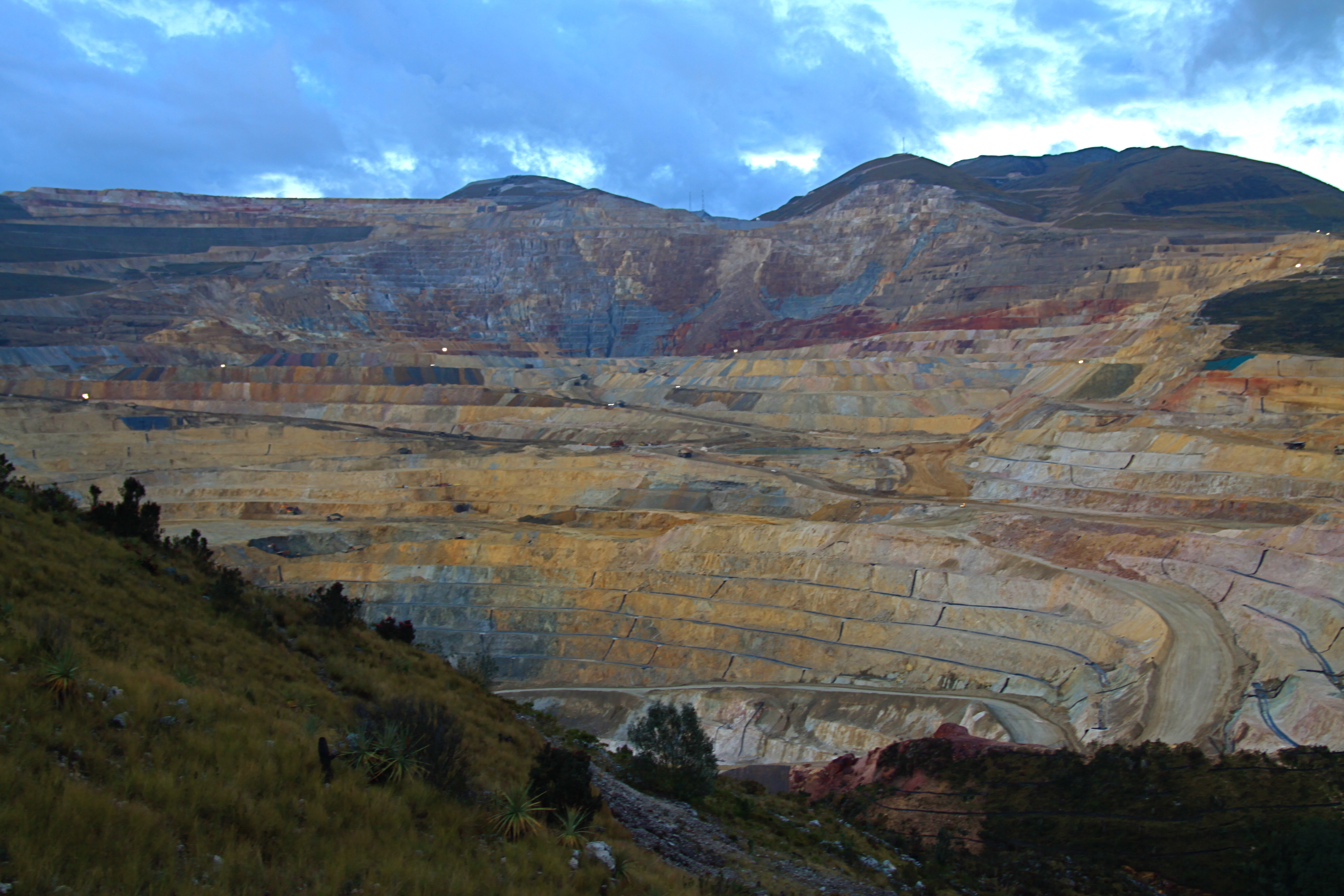
Yanacocha gold mine in Cajamarca, Peru

Mineral corporations often implement development programs in mining communities. For example, the Yanacocha Mine project (MYSA), jointly operated by U.S.-based Newmont Mining Corporation and the Peruvian Compania de Minas Buenaventura, S.A. MYSA has implemented rural credit programs, road construction, reforestation efforts, agricultural development, and established potable water systems in nearby communities. A 2004 study found that benefits from these programs were unevenly distributed and that mining in the area had reduced community members' access to social and natural capital that had previously been important to their livelihoods.

=== Government response ===
The Peruvian government has played a moderate role in responding to corporate-community conflict arising from the mineral industry. In January 2012, the Humala administration established an international commission with the task of identifying ways to reduce the environmental effects of the Newmont Mining Corporation's Conga project. Newmont was forced to comply with the revised measures before resuming operations. When government officials presented the new terms to local community members in order to gain their consent, they were faced with considerable opposition and violent protests ensued. Thus, though the national government has taken some steps towards addressing social protest, it is often unable to adequately address communities' expectations about corporate accountability and the regulation of environmental damage caused by mining activities. Another example concerns mining conflict in Peru's Piura region. Between 1998 and 2003, conflicts arose between the Canadian company Manhattan Minerals and members of the Tambogrande community. Following a local referendum in which 93% of the community voted against mining operations, Manhattan Minerals left the region. Similar conflicts ensued when another corporation, Monterrico Minerals, began conducting exploration work in Piura's highland provinces. This conflict led to the death of two farmers during violent protests and incited many national and international actors to intervene. A referendum took place once again and more than 90% of the population voted against mining. Despite such opposition, Monterrico Metals and the government of Peru insisted that the mining operations go forward. According to the Community Development Journal, such conflicts demonstrate that the government is largely absent in helping community members and corporations to reach mutual agreements. As a result, local community members often view the government as a biased mediator that favors corporate interests. With a lack of government intervention, community members resort to protest in attempt to resolve issues stemming from the mineral industry. In April 2022, the country's prime minister announced that Peru will declare a state of emergency to restore copper production in Cuajone mine. This is due to protests being done in the top mines in the nation, which affected 20% of Peru's national copper output. Protesters complained that despite high global prices, nearby communities do not receive enough financial compensation, and therefore they demand a share of future profits.

=== Solutions ===
There are several potential solutions to the corporate-community conflict surrounding Peru's mineral industry, including environmental licensing, the documentation of accountability, and the use of a local legitimacy strategy. Environmental licensing refers to the authority of the Peruvian government to control the pollution generated by mineral extraction corporations. Documenting accountability refers to the process by which citizens exercise a say in the activities and decisions of the government and industrial corporations. Lastly, the local legitimacy strategy is a type of community interaction model in which corporations exercise social responsibility by prioritizing the needs of the community.

One example of sustainable mining practice is Barrick Gold Corporation's Lagunas Norte mine. Barrick has taken active steps towards preventing and addressing conflict with rural communities living near the mine site. Firstly, it makes use of a communication team and a community-relation team, each made up of ten national citizens with expertise in fields such as anthropology, socially, and conflict mediation. The teams collaborate with local authorities and community members to assess their needs, address conflict, and manage development programs. Barrick employs a 'Community Grievance Management Resolution Procedures' mechanism that allows it to monitor community discontent by providing space for any person or group to submit a grievance at any time. When grievances are identified, Barrick tracks them and works to redress the associated issues. In addition, Barrick practices social licensing by regulating the environmental impacts generated by its mining operations. It has cleaned up abandoned mine sites, implemented a water management system, worked to restore soil conditions, and established a ranch for the purpose of herding and livestock activity. Through this model, Barrick carries out sustainable mining operations while successfully managing corporate-community conflict.

== Outlook ==
The energy, mining, and related industries are expected to continue to attract capital flows via joint ventures and consortia, privatizations, and direct acquisitions. According to ProInversión, the privatization process in the minerals sector and FDI in every sector of the Peruvian economy, particularly in the banking and energy industries are expected to continue to generate additional investments. Higher demand for copper, gold, iron ore, and silver and high metal prices are likely to encourage mining companies to invest in expanding and modernizing their operations. The liquefaction of Camisea's natural gas for export to China, MERCOSUR, North American Free Trade Agreement (NAFTA), and other trading partners is expected to increase Peru's mineral exports further. The transportation phase of Camisea's pipelines for natural gas (714 km) and for natural gas liquids (560 km), however, could encounter financial difficulties because of leaky NGL pipeline. This second phase would involve establishing infrastructure to pipe the gas and associated liquids from Camisea to the Lima area and to liquefy 17 million cubic meters per day of gas for exports to NAFTA and possibly to Chile. For that, and to develop the 113 billion cubic meters of gas in Camisea's Block 56, an investment of $3.2 billion will be required. However, the natural gas liquids pipeline, which began operating in 2004 following the Upstream phase of development, has ruptured on five different occasions.

At the national level, this trend could reduce the attraction of new investments and preclude Camisea's higher output needed for the regional economic development. On the other hand, Peru continues to encourage community development and environmental protection based on social responsibility and sustainable development principles. In spite of this strategy, the mineral industry continues to be the target of social protest due to mining operations' impact on livelihood resources. These events have affected the image of the mining industry and caused growing concern about the regional climate for mining investments.

Even though there might be some challenges due to said political unrest events, mining investment projects in Peru are expected to reach US$60 billion over the next 10 years.

== See also ==
- List of mines in Peru
