= Azuca mine =

Silver mine in Peru

Location
- Location: Ayacucho Region, Peru

Production
- Products: silver

The Azuca mine is a large silver mine located in the south of Peru in Ayacucho Region. Azuca represents one of the largest silver reserve in Peru and in the world having estimated reserves of 42.7 million oz of silver. In March 2025 Compañía Minera Ares S.A.C, a subsidiary of Hochschild Mining PLC, sold the mines Azuca and Arcata to Sierra Caraz S.A.C.

== See also ==
- Zinc mining
- List of mines in Peru
