= Morococha mine =

Silver mine in Peru

- Location: Junín Region, Peru
- Products: silver

The Morococha mine is a large silver mine located in the center of Peru in Junín Region. Morococha represents one of the largest silver reserve in Peru and in the world having in 2012 estimated reserves of 34.1 million oz of silver.

== See also ==
- List of mines in Peru
- Zinc mining
