= Bayóvar mine =

Mine in Peru

Coordinates: 6.0698°S 80.8524°W

- Interactive map of Bayóvar mine

Location
- Location: Piura Region, Peru

Production
- Products: Phosphates

History
- Opened: 2010

Owner
- Company: Vale

The Bayóvar mine is a large mine in the Sechura Desert in the Piura Region of Peru. Bayóvar represents one of the largest phosphate reserves in Peru, having estimated reserves of 238 megatonnes (234,000,000 long tons; 262,000,000 short tons) of ore. Annual production can reach 3.9 Mt (3,800,000 long tons; 4,300,000 short tons) of phosphate concentrate at a minimum grade of 29% P_{2}O_{5}.

== See also ==
- List of mines in Peru
- Zinc mining
