= Berenguela mine =

Silver mine in Peru

Location
- Location: Puno Region, Peru

Production
- Products: silver

The Berenguela mine is a large silver mine located in the south-east of Peru in Puno Region. Berenguela represents one of the largest silver reserve in Peru and in the world having estimated reserves of 66.1 million oz of silver and 0.6 million oz of gold.

== See also ==
- List of mines in Peru
- Zinc mining
