= Let Them Come and Leave that Misery =

Letter by Andrés Chacón

"Let Them Come and Leave that Misery" is the name given to a letter written by Andrés Chacón in 1570, while he was living in Trujillo, Peru. In the letter, which is addressed to his brother Francisco, Chacón details work with the silver mines and farms in Peru, which were not very lucrative. He expresses concern about how much debt he feels he owes to the natives working for him and that if he cannot repay his debts, that he will go to Hell. Further in the letter Chacón expresses hope that his labors will prove fruitful and he explicitly pleads to God to aid him.

The letter has been cited as an example of communication and the blending of cultures of the time period.
