= Cañariaco Norte mine =

Mine in Ferreñafe, Peru

- Interactive map of Cañariaco Norte mine

Location
- Location: Cajamarca Region, Peru

Production
- Products: Copper

Owner
- Company: Candente Copper

The Cañariaco Norte mine is a single, contiguous open-pit copper deposit located in northwestern Peru in Ferreñafe Province. It is wholly owned by Candente Copper Corp. and represents one of the largest copper resources in Peru and globally. The deposit has estimated measured and indicated resources of 752.4 million tonnes grading 0.45% copper, containing approximately 7.533 billion pounds of copper, as well as inferred resources of 157.7 million tonnes grading 0.41% copper, containing about 1.434 billion pounds of copper. Proven and probable reserves are estimated at 910 million tonnes of ore grading 0.45% copper.

== See also ==
- List of mines in Peru
