= Tia Maria mine =

Mine in Peru

Coordinates: 17.0131°S 71.7713°W

Tia Maria Copper Deposit
- Interactive map of Tia Maria Copper Deposit
- Location: Arequipa Region, Peru
- Products: Copper
- Company: Southern Copper Corporation

The Tia Maria mine is a large copper deposit located in the south of Peru in the province of Islay, Arequipa Region. The deposit contains an estimated total reserves 711 million tonnes of ore graded at 0.36% copper. The project is operated by Southern Peru Copper Corporation.

After years of delays due to local resistance, the Ministry of Energy and Mines approved the mining license in October 2025.

== Protests ==
From the beginning, the local community have resisted the arrival of the mine which triggered state repression.

In 2011, UNOPS reviewed the Environmental Impact Assessment and found 135 observations. One of the gravest observations was the missing of a hydrogeological study into the effects the mining operation has on water in the area. The government wanted to ignore the found deficiencies which sparked large scale protests. The state sent a large police force that resulted in violent protests which led to the deaths of three people. Concerns about the impact on agriculture led to the project's being put on hold.

A revised Environmental Impact Assessment by Geoservice Ingeniería for Southern Copper Corporation was approved in August 2014.

A new round of protests began in March 2015, including a march of eight hundred people. Many people were injured, and, by May, three more people had died during the protests, including a construction worker and a policeman.

=== Protest background ===
Due to the presence of the Tambo River, the region is used often for agriculture. The main opposition comes down to 3 reasons:

- Ground water usage by the mine
- Contamination of the ground water
- Air pollution

== See also ==
- Mining in Peru
- List of mines in Peru
