= Galeno mine =

Mine in Peru

Coordinates: 6.9753°S 78.3237°W

- Interactive map of Galeno mine
- Location: Loreto Region, Peru
- Products: Copper, molybdenum

The Galeno mine is a large copper mine located in the north of Peru in Loreto Region. Galeno represents one of the largest copper reserve in Peru and in the world having estimated reserves of 716 million tonnes of ore grading 0.5% copper, 0.013% molybdenum, 2.75 million oz of gold and 57.5 million oz of silver.

== See also ==
- List of mines in Peru
