= Crespo mine =

Silver mine in Peru

Location
- Location: Ayacucho Region, Peru

Production
- Products: silver

The Crespo mine is a large silver mine located in the south of Peru in Ayacucho Region. Crespo represents one of the largest silver reserve in Peru and in the world having estimated reserves of 28.8 million oz of silver.

== See also ==
- List of mines in Peru
