= Mantaro mine =

Mine in Peru

- Location: Junín Region, Peru
- Products: Phosphates
- Opened: 2010

The Mantaro mine is a large mine located in the Junín Region. Mantaro represents one of the largest phosphates reserve in Peru having estimated reserves of 1.14 billion tonnes of ore grading 9% P_{2}O_{5}.

== See also ==
- List of mines in Peru
