= Costancia mine =

Copper mine in Peru

Constancia mine
- Location: Chumbivilcas province, Cusco Region, Peru
- Products: Copper

The Constancia mine is a large copper mine in the south of Peru in Cuzco Region. Constancia is one of the largest copper reserves in the world, having estimated reserves of 440 million tonnes of ore grading 0.34% copper, 0.01% molybdenum, 0.7 million oz of gold and 50.2 million oz of silver.

== About ==
The project started commercial production on second quarter of 2015, after Ausenco began executing EPCM services in 2011. Several other contractors have offered products, and services making the development of the Constancia project a reality.

== See also ==
- List of mines in Peru
