= Pallancata mine =

Silver mine in Peru

- Location: Ayacucho Region, Peru
- Products: silver

The Pallancata mine is a large silver mine located in the south of Peru in Ayacucho Region. Pallancata represents one of the largest silver reserves in Peru and in the world having estimated reserves of 30.6 million oz of silver.

== See also ==
- List of mines in Peru
