= Río Huaypetue mine =

Open-pit gold mine in Peru

Coordinates: 13.011503°S 70.545742°W

Río Huaypetue mine

The Río Huaypetue mine is a large open-pit gold mine in south-eastern Peru, inside the Cusco Region and close to the border with the Madre de Dios and Puno regions. It has been estimated that at the peak of production in 1998, some 2 percent of the world's annual gold production may have come from Huaypetue.

Due to the remoteness of the area in the Peruvian Amazon where the mine is located the mining operations are poorly regulated, with many reports of child labor and environmental damage. According to some reports children as young as 12 work in the mines, with government officials describing slave-like conditions and estimating that in certain sectors, 50 percent of the workers are boys under 18. Working conditions are hard with 10- to 12-hour days and many workers suffering from malnutrition. As part of the mining process mercury is used to separate the gold, with the mercury in some cases mixed by hand before being burned off. Children exposed to the substance suffer the risk of brain damage.

The surface mining operations have sprawled to cover over 100 square kilometers, an area previously covered by primary rainforest. Mercury contamination from the mines is widespread, posing a risk for fish and other aquatic life downstream of the mine. The sediment and runoff from the mine can be traced for hundreds of kilometers along the river.

== See also ==
- List of mines in Peru
- La Rinconada, Peru
- Pallaqueo
- Pirquinero
