= Marcona mine =

Mine in Peru

Coordinates: 15.2039°S 75.1085°W

- Interactive map of Marcona mine
- Location: Nazca Province, Peru
- Products: Iron ore
- Opened: 2010

The Marcona mine is a large iron mine located in western Peru in the Nazca Province. Marcona represents one of the largest iron ore reserves in Peru and in the world, having estimated reserves of 1.4 billion tonnes of ore grading 54% iron metal. It is owned by the Chinese state owned company Shougang Hiero Peru.

== See also ==
- List of mines in Peru
