= Arcata mine =

Mine in Peru

Location
- Location: Arequipa Region, Peru

Production
- Products: silver

The Arcata mine is a large silver mine located in the south of Peru in Arequipa Region. Arcata represents one of the largest silver reserve in Peru and in the world having estimated reserves of 46.6 million oz of silver. In March 2025 Compañía Minera Ares S.A.C, a subsidiary of Hochschild Mining PLC, sold the mine to Sierra Caraz S.A.C.

== Statistics ==
	2016	2015	2014	2013	2012	2011	2010	2009	2008	2007
Ore production (tonnes)	677,309	648,051	701,947	900,861	773,498	687,966	645,974	643,059	557,870	415,400
Average silver grade (g/t)	337	323	286	217	271	312	439	503	571	560
Average gold grade (g/t)	1.24	0.99	0.85	0.74	0.83	0.88	1.40	1.56	1.53	1.43
Silver produced (koz)	6,343	5,613	5,827	4,984	5,526	6,081	8,099	9,542	9,032	6,553
Gold produced (koz)	22.54	15.67	16.89	16.83	17.27	17.38	25.83	28.64	24.04	16.48
Silver equivalent produced (koz)	8,011	6,772	6,841	5,994	6,562	7,124	9,649	11,260	10,474	7,542
Silver sold (koz)	6,346	5,653	5,621	4,924	5,236	5,979	8,095	8,748	8,564	6,544
Gold sold (koz)	22.04	15.3	15.66	15.95	15.9	16.7	24.9	26.02	22.36	15.50
Resources (attrib. Moz Ag Eq)	104.2	117.6	108.7	99.4	106.4	112.3	98.7	79.4	87.2	70.3
Resource LOM (yrs)	n/a	n/a	n/a	11.6	11.7	11.5	9.6	7.4	9.3	10.1
Capacity	2,500	2,500	1,500	1,750	1,750	1,750	1,750	1,750	1,200	1,000

== See also ==
- List of mines in Peru
- Silver mining
