= Haquira =

Copper mine in Peru

Coordinates: 14.1682°S 72.3589°W

Haquira mine
- Interactive map of Haquira mine
- Location: Apurímac Region, Peru
- Products: Copper

Haquira is a large copper deposit located in the south of Peru in Apurímac Region. Haquira represents one of the largest copper reserve in Peru and in the world having estimated reserves of 1.98 billion tonnes of ore grading 0.2% copper.

== See also ==
- List of mines in Peru
