= Antamina Tailings Dam =

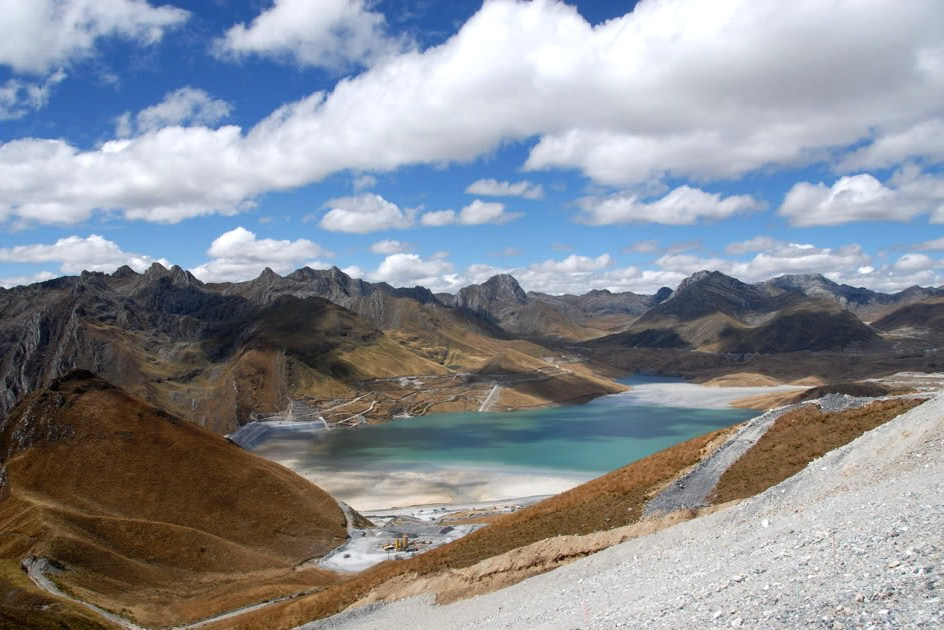
- The tailings pond with the dam to the left

- Location within Peru
- Country: Peru
- Location: Huaraz
- Coordinates: 09°32′26″S 77°01′53″W
- Status: In use, being raised
- Construction began: 2000; 26 years ago
- Opening date: 2001; 25 years ago
- Owner: Teck Resources

Dam and spillways
- Type of dam: Tailings dam
- Impounds: Ayash River
- Height: Concrete-face rock-fill: 130 m (427 ft); Rock-fill raising: 215 m (705 ft)
- Length: Concrete-face rock-fill: 1,050 m (3,445 ft); Rock-fill raising: 1,300 m (4,265 ft)

Reservoir
- Total capacity: 570,000,000 metric tons (560,997,721 long tons; 628,317,447 short tons)

The Antamina Tailings Dam, also known as the Antamina Tailings Impoundment Facility, is a tailings dam located in the Huincush Ravine 55 km (34 mi) east of Huaraz in the Ancash Region of Peru. The purpose of the dam is to store tailings processed at the nearby Antamina mine. In 2003, Golder Associates, Burnaby, B.C. was awarded the 2002 Canadian Consulting Engineering Award for its innovative design of the dam.

== Background ==
The dam was designed by Golder Associates, Burnaby, B.C. and Ingetec SA between 1998 and 1999. Construction on the 130 m (427 ft) high concrete-face rock-fill starter dam began in 2000 was complete in April 2001. A 15,000,000 m^{3} (12,161 acre⋅ft) reservoir was filled behind the dam assist the concentrater. By April 2003, the dam was raised from its original elevation of 4,010 m (13,156 ft) above sea level to 4,045 m (13,271 ft). The dam will continually be raised until it reaches 240 m (787 ft) tall at an elevation of 4,125 m (13,533 ft) and length of 1.3 km (0.8 mi). Currently the dam is undergoing its fourth raising to 215 m (705 ft) in height.

== Design and operation ==
As a base for the dam, a 130 m (427 ft) concrete-face rock-fill dam was constructed. From there, the dam is being raised with rock-fill with the upstream side being protected by a concrete slab. The original starter dam was 1,050 m (3,445 ft) in length and when the dam reaches its final height of 240 m (787 ft), it will be 1,300 m (4,265 ft) long. The dam will hold 570,000,000 metric tons (560,997,721 long tons; 628,317,447 short tons) of tailings and the mine is expected to produce 546,000,000 metric tons (537,376,764 long tons; 601,861,976 short tons). Upstream of the dam, a series of channels and embankments divert water from the Ayash River from entering the reservoir. This helps the environment and protects the stability of the dam. The reservoir is lined with a geomembrane which controls seepage of tailings into the environment. Water released into the environment is purified to meet standards and discharges from the dam are maintained at at least 150 liters per second.
