= Chucapaca mine =

Gold mine in Peru

Location
- Location: Cusco Region, Peru

Production
- Products: Gold

Owner
- Company: Gold Fields

The Chucapaca mine is one of the largest gold mines in Peru and in the world. The mine is located in the south of the country in the Cusco Region. The mine has estimated reserves of 4.3 million oz of gold and 34.6 million oz of silver.

== See also ==
- List of mines in Peru
