= Lagunas Norte mine =

Mine in Peru

Coordinates: 7.9481°S 78.2436°W

- Interactive map of Lagunas Norte mine
- Location: La Libertad Region, Peru
- Products: Gold
- Company: Barrick Gold

The Lagunas Norte mine is one of the largest gold mines in Peru and in the world. The mine is located in the north-western part of Peru in La Libertad Region, 140 kilometers from Trujillo. At the end of 2018, the mine produced 245,000 ounces of gold and estimated reserves of 3.95 million oz of gold.

In 2019, Barrick announced that it had placed the mine on care and maintenance. In February 2021, Barrick reached an agreement to sell its 100% interest in the Lagunas Norte to Boroo Pte Ltd ("Boroo") for a total consideration of up to $81 million, plus the assumption by Boroo of Barrick’s closure liability relating to Lagunas Norte of $226 million backed by an existing $173 million bonding obligation. On 1 June 2021, the sale was completed and Boroo says Lagunas Norte represents a transformative opportunity as its goal is to become a mid-tier producer in the near term. Boroo plans to initiate the next phase of the project to recover carbonaceous oxide ore and also has longer term plans to mine the high sulphur refractory ore below the oxide zone.

== See also ==
- List of mines in Peru
