= Alta Copper =

Canadian mining company

Alta Copper Corp.
- Type: Public
- Traded as: TSX: ATCU; OTCQX: ATCUF; BVL: ATCU
- Industry: Mining
- Headquarters: Vancouver, British Columbia, Canada
- Key people: Giulio T. Bonifacio (President & CEO); Dale Found (CFO & Vice President)
- Products: Copper, Base Metals, Precious Metals
- Website: altacopper.com

Alta Copper Corp. (formerly Candente Copper) is developing the Cañariaco project. Within this project, Cañariaco Norte, is the 10th largest late-stage copper resource in the world (over 9 billion pounds copper, 2.1 million ounces of gold and 59.4 million ounces of silver Measured and Indicated*) and 6th highest in grade (RFC Ambrian, December 2021 and Haywood, December 2021). A positive PEA was recently completed on its 100% owned Cañariaco project. Based on projected average annual metal production of 173M pounds copper, 31,395 ounces gold and 703,588 ounces silver for 28 years and an initial capital cost estimate of $1.04B, the Cañariaco Norte project has an after-tax net present value (“NPV”) of US$1,010M using a copper price of US$3.50/pound and a discount rate of 8%. The NPV increases to US$1,833M and payback of 4.5 years when using a copper price of US$4.50/pound.

In addition to Cañariaco Norte, the Cañariaco Project includes the Cañariaco Sur deposit (2.2B pounds copper, 1.2M ounces of gold and 15.0M ounces of silver Inferred*) and Quebrada Verde prospect, located within a 4km NE-SW trend in northern Peru.

Between 2018 and 2021, the Cañariaco Norte project was included in four industry research reports comparing global copper projects. RFC Ambrian: Cañariaco Norte in top 10 of 23 projects with potential to involve third party M&A (December 2021); Haywood: Cañariaco Norte one of 18 assets selected as likely to be considered by majors looking to acquire (December 2021); Deutsche Bank: Cañariaco Norte identified as one of 3 projects required to meet the upcoming copper supply-demand gap (February 2021); Goldman Sachs: Cañariaco Norte identified with incentive copper price in the lowest quartile of the top 84 copper projects worldwide (October 2018).

During 2023, Alta Copper continued engineering, environmental, and community engagement activities at the Cañariaco project while pursuing strategic financing and partnership opportunities.

In December 2025, Fortescue announced an agreement to acquire all outstanding shares of Alta Copper that it did not already own. The all-cash transaction valued Alta Copper at approximately C$139 million.

Following completion of the acquisition in early 2026, Alta Copper ceased operating as an independent publicly traded company. The Cañariaco project, including the Cañariaco Norte and Cañariaco Sur deposits and the Quebrada Verde prospect, became wholly owned by Fortescue, which announced that future development updates would be provided through its own reporting.
