= Bear Creek Mining =

Canadian mining exploration company

- Traded as: OTCQX: BCEKF

Bear Creek Mining Corporation is a junior mining exploration company headquartered in Vancouver, Canada. The company is headed by Chairwoman Catherine McLeod-Seltzer, CEO Anthony Hawkshaw and President and COO Eric Caba. It is a publicly traded company whose stock is listed on the TSX Venture Exchange as BCM.

== Description ==
Bear Creek is a multi-asset precious metals producer anchored by the Mercedes gold mine in Sonora, Mexico and world-class Corani silver deposit in Puno, Peru. The proposed Corani silver-lead-zinc mine is shovel ready with all key permits in place and surface rights purchased. While there is currently a measure of political instability in Peru, local community support for the Corani project is unwavering and Social License is solid. There is a detailed, constructable plan, with strong interest from major finance partners (pending political stabilization). Estimated two year payback for construction costs. The Corani prospect was purchased from Rio Tinto in two portions in 2008 and 2011. Feasibility studies for Corani were published in 2011 and 2015. They estimated the mine could produce 13.4 million ounces of silver annually in its first five years of production and an average of 8.4Moz per year over its 18-year viable period of production. The mine would also produce lead and zinc concentrates.

== See also ==
List of mines in Peru

Zinc mining
