= Huacullani District =

Coordinates: 16.6305°S 69.6002°W

Huacullani Waqullani
- District
- Interactive map of Huacullani
- Country: Peru
- Region: Puno
- Province: Chucuito
- Capital: Huacullani

Government
  - Mayor: Braulio Morales Choquecahua

Area
  - Total: 705.28 km^{2} (272.31 sq mi)
- Elevation: 3,937 m (12,917 ft)

Population (2007 census)
  - Total: 14,906
  - Density: 21.135/km^{2} (54.739/sq mi)
- Time zone: UTC-5 (PET)
- UBIGEO: 210403

Huacullani (from Aymara Waqullani) is one of seven districts of the Chucuito Province in the Puno Region in southern Peru.

== Geography ==
One of the highest elevations of the district is Wila Purakani at approximately 4,800 m (15,700 ft). Other mountains are listed below:

- Altarani
- Chachakumani
- Ch'iyar Jaqhi
- Ch'uwaña
- Jach'a Nasa
- Jach'a Uma Chuqu
- Kimsa Chuta
- Kuntur Ikiña
- Laram Jaqhi
- Laramani
- Mamaniri
- Marqu Nasani
- Nasa Parqu
- Payrumani
- Pä Sirka
- Pukara
- Saywani Sirka
- Tanka Qullu
- Uma Chuqu
- Waka P'iqi
- Wanq'uni
- Wila Purakani
- Wila Qullu
- Wiluyu

== Ethnic groups ==
The people in the district are mainly indigenous citizens of Aymara descent. Aymara is the language which the majority of the population (92.62%) learnt to speak in childhood, 6.60% of the residents started speaking using the Spanish language (2007 Peru Census).

== Authorities ==
=== Mayors ===
- 2011-2014: Braulio Morales Choquecahua.
- 2007-2010: Jaime Musaja Chipana.

== See also ==
- Administrative divisions of Peru
