= Cerro Verde =

Sociedads Minera Cerro Verde S.A.A.
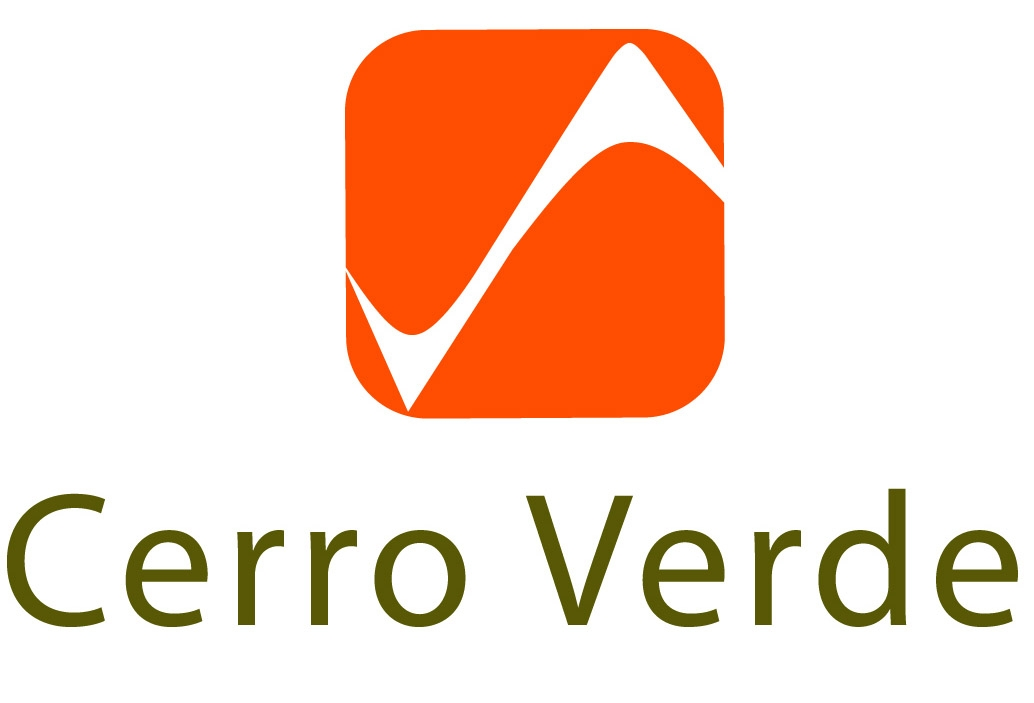
- Company type: Public
- Traded as: BVL: CVERDEC1
- Industry: Mining
- Founded: (1970)
- Headquarters: Arequipa, Peru
- Key people: John Douglas Brack (CEO)
- Products: Copper
- Revenue: ▼US$ 1.7 Billion (2009)
- Net income: ▼US$ 709.0 million (2009)
- Number of employees: 1,938
- Parent: Freeport-McMoRan
- Website: Cerro Verde

Cerro Verde is a Peru-based mining company founded in 1970. Its activities include the extraction, exploitation and production of copper from the porphyry copper deposit located southeast of the city of Arequipa. In addition, the company holds a copper sale agreement with Sumitomo Metal Mining, as well as a molybdenum sale contract with Climax Molybdenum Company.

Cerro Verde project is undergoing a major expansion in order to increase its concentrator facilities to 360,000 metric tons-per-day (mtd). Fluor Corporation is in charge of the construction management services for said expansion.

Montgomery Watson y Harza (MWH) and Alto Cayma consortium supervised the construction. They have together constructed the La Tomilla II drinking water plant, a social responsibility project through which potable water for residents of Arequipa in Perú is being produced and delivered.
