= Silver mining =

Extraction of silver from the ground

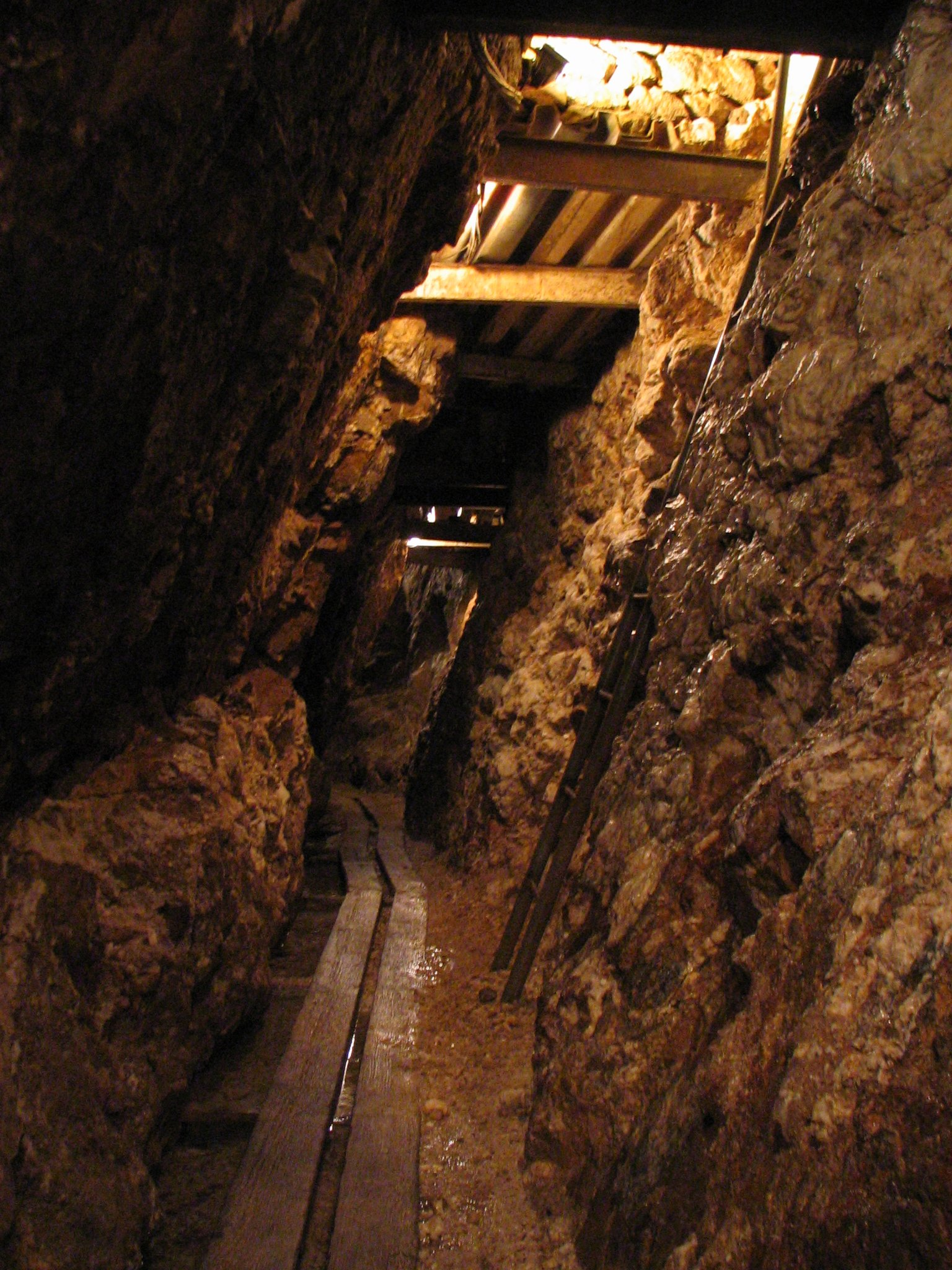
An underground silver mine in Suggental (near Freiburg im Breisgau), Baden-Württemberg, Germany

Silver mining is the extraction of silver by mining. Silver is a precious metal and holds high economic value. Because silver is often found in intimate combination with other metals, its extraction requires the use of complex technologies. In 2008, approximately 25,900 metric tons of silver were consumed worldwide, most of which came from mining. Silver mining has a variety of effects on the environment, humans, and animals.

== Silver sources ==
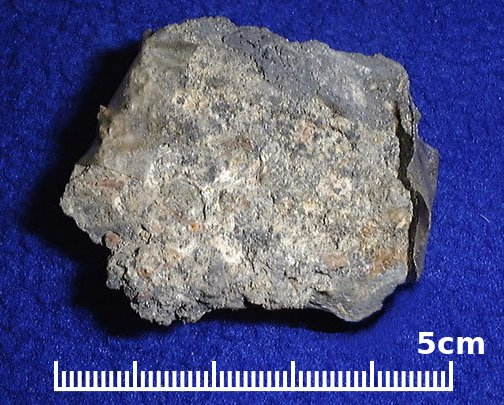
A photograph of silver ore

Silver-bearing ore typically contains very little silver, with much higher percentages of copper and lead. Specific minerals include argentite (Ag_{2}S), chlorargyrite ("horn silver," AgCl), polybasite (Ag, Cu)_{16}Sb_{2}S_{11}), and proustite (Ag_{3}AsS_{3}). Silver mainly occurs as a contaminant in chalcopyrite and galena, important ores of copper and lead, respectively.

Some ores are actually mined explicitly for their silver value vs. the silver being a by-product of other metals. However, silver is only found rarely in a native form as nuggets, in placer deposits, and veins.

=== Excavation ===
Methods for mining vary for every body of ore. The chosen method depends on the ore grade, the steepness and shape of the terrain, its depth, host rock, transportation availability, and other economic factors. Commonly, silver ore is obtained from open pit mines, and underground drifts and shafts. Explosives are frequently used to shatter veins into manageable pieces, which are transported via mine cars and then lifted to the surface. This process can be dangerous.

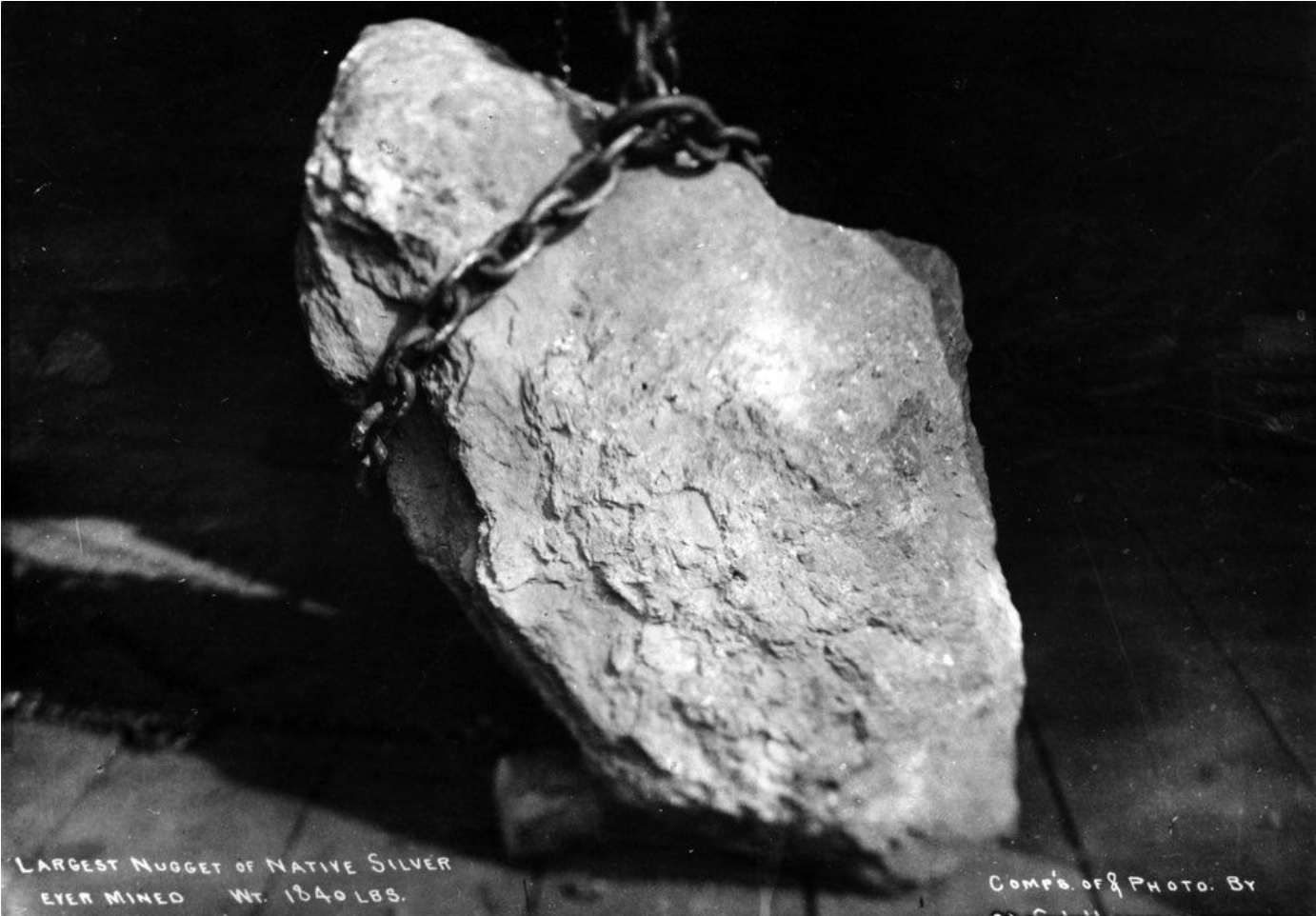
A large nugget of native silver, mined in Colorado U.S.

=== Ore processing ===
Once removed from the mine, silver-containing ore is crushed (comminution) into a fine powder to expose individual grains to chemical processing. As a byproduct of the mining of lead and copper, silver ores are often purified by froth flotation. After froth flotation, silver is extracted by a cyanide process, akin to technology used for gold extraction. In some cases, the ore is treated by smelting before cyanide treatment. Silver is also produced during the electrolytic refining of copper and by application of the Parkes process on lead ores. Commercial grade fine silver is at least 99.9 percent pure silver, and purities greater than 99.999 percent are available.

=== Recycling ===
About 5000 tons of silver are annually recovered from scrap. Jewelry, photographic film, silverware, coins, and electronics are sources of recyclable silver. However, jewelry and silverware are not as important of a source of recycled metal compared to electronics and, until the 21st century, photographic film. The main techniques to process silver scrap: electrolysis, metallic replacement, and precipitation. Electrolytic silver recovery refers to the process where silver cations are reduced to their metallic state, adhering to an electrode.

In metallic replacement, a solution of silver thiosulfate is converted to the metallic state by the action of a solid reducing agent, such a steel wool. The equipment in this process is commonly referred to as "metallic recovery cartridges".

Precipitation refers to the process of extracting silver from silver-rich solutions. This technique uses precipitating agents to form silver sulfide in the solution. The precipitation method is not extensively utilized due to the fact that excess sulfide can result in the release of toxic gas.

== Production areas ==
The principal sources of silver are copper, copper-nickel, gold, lead, and lead-zinc ores obtained from Canada, Mexico, Poland, Peru, Bolivia, Australia and the United States.

Mexico was the world's largest silver producer in 2014, producing 5,000 metric tons (161 million troy ounces), 18.7 percent of the 26,800 tonnes (862 million troy ounce) production of the world.

Top 6 Production Stage Silver Mines (2011)
Mine	Country	2010 Production	2020 Production
Cannington Silver/Lead/Zinc Mine	Australia	38.6 Moz	11.792 Moz
Fresnillo Silver Mine	Mexico	38.6 Moz	13.055 Moz
San Cristobal Polymetallic Mine	Bolivia	19.4 Moz	
Antamina Copper/Zinc Mine	Peru	14.9 Moz	
Rudna Copper Mine	Poland	14.9 Moz	
Peñasquito Polymetallic Mine	Mexico	13.9 Moz	

Top 6 Near-Term Silver Mine Development Projects Through 2015
Project	Country	Anticipated Annual Production Capacity (due within five years)
Pascua Lama	Chile	25.0 Moz
Navidad	Argentina	15.0 Moz
Juanicipio	Mexico	14.0 Moz
Malku Khota	Bolivia	13.2 Moz
Hackett River	Canada	13.1 Moz
Corani	Peru	10.0 Moz

== Silver mining companies ==
Silver mining companies engage in the discovery and production of silver. While these companies prioritize in silver, many of them also engage in other metals such as gold, palladium, lead, and zinc.

Top 10 Largest Silver Mining Companies Through March 2023
Company name	Revenue	Net Income	Exchange
Industrias Penoles SAB de CV (IPOAF)	$5.57 billion	$89.25 million	OTC
Polymetal International PLC (AUCOY)	$2.67 billion	$164 million	OTC
Fresnillo PLC (FNLPF)	$2.50 billion	$236.46 million	OTC
Pan American Silver Corp. (PAAS)	$1.54 billion	$154.956 million	NASDAQ
Wheaton Precious Metals Corp. (WPM)	$1.11 billion	$794.82 million	New York Stock Exchange
Buenaventura Mining Co. Inc. (BVN)	$831.79 million	$351.70 million	New York Stock Exchange
Coeur Mining Inc. (CDE)	$783.40 million	$137.96 million	New York Stock Exchange
Fortuna Silver Mines Inc. (FSM)	$715.70 million	$40.39 million	New York Stock Exchange
Hecla Mining Co. (HL)	$709.16 million	$21.02 million	New York Stock Exchange
First Majestic Silver Corp. (AG)	$684.12 million	$101.43 million	New York Stock Exchange

== History ==
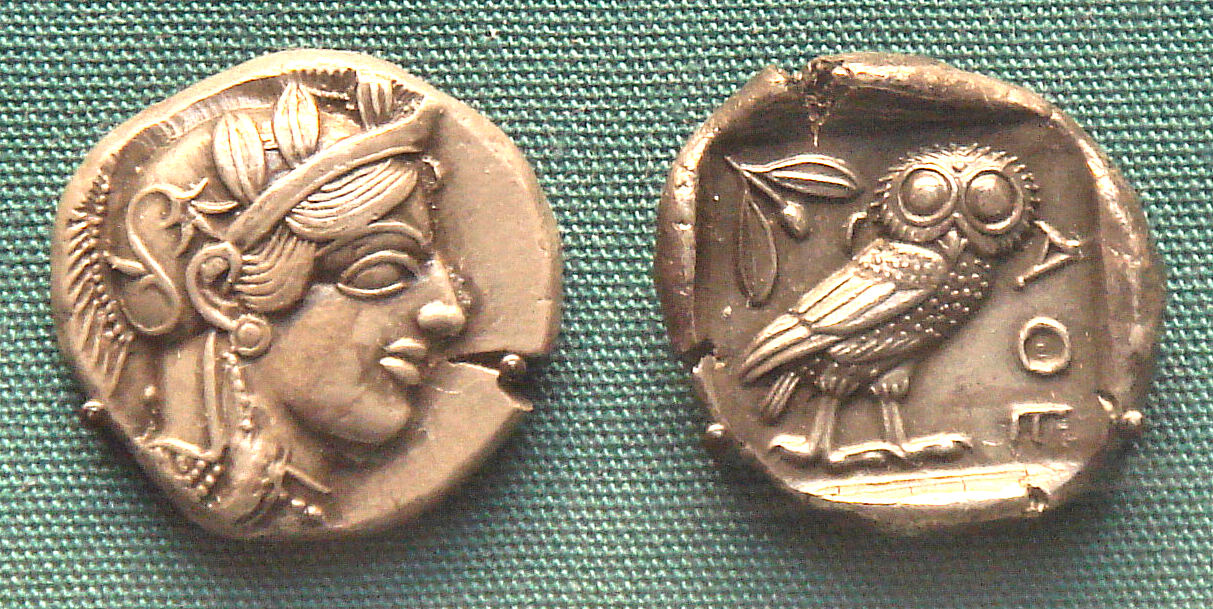
Early silver Athenian coin, 5th century BCE. British Museum.

The historical record of silver mining dates back to 3,000 BC in Anatolia. As silver is a precious metal often used for coins and bullion, its mining has historically often been lucrative. As with other precious metals such as gold or platinum, newly discovered deposits of silver ore have sparked silver rushes of miners seeking their fortunes. Silver was a valuable metal that helped early civilizations around Ancient Greece. In recent centuries, large deposits were discovered and mined in the Americas, influencing the growth and development of Mexico, Andean countries such as Bolivia, Chile and Peru, as well as Argentina, Canada and the United States.

Silver is mentioned in the Book of Genesis, and slag heaps found in Asia Minor and on the islands of the Aegean Sea indicate that silver was being separated from lead as early as the 4th millennium BC. By 1,200 BC, silver mining shifted into the mines of Laurion in Greece, and continued growing the surrounding empire. The silver mines at Laurion were very rich and helped provide a currency for the economy of ancient Athens, where the process involved mining the ore in underground galleries, washing and then smelting it to produce the metal. Elaborate washing tables still exist at the site which used rain water held in cisterns and collected during the winter months.

By the year 100 AD, the epicenter of silver mining transitioned into Spain, where the Roman Empire flourished. The Romans took over silver mining in Spain from Carthage after their acquisition of Carthaginian territories there following the Second Punic War. Extraction of silver from lead ore was widespread in Roman Britain very soon after the Roman conquest of the first century AD.

One of the main aims of the Viking expansion throughout Europe was to acquire and trade silver. Bergen and Dublin are still important centres of silver making. An example of a collection of Viking-age silver for trading purposes is the Galloway Hoard.

From the mid-15th century silver began to be extracted from copper ores in massive quantities using the liquation process creating a boost to the mining and metallurgy industries of Central Europe.

=== Americas ===
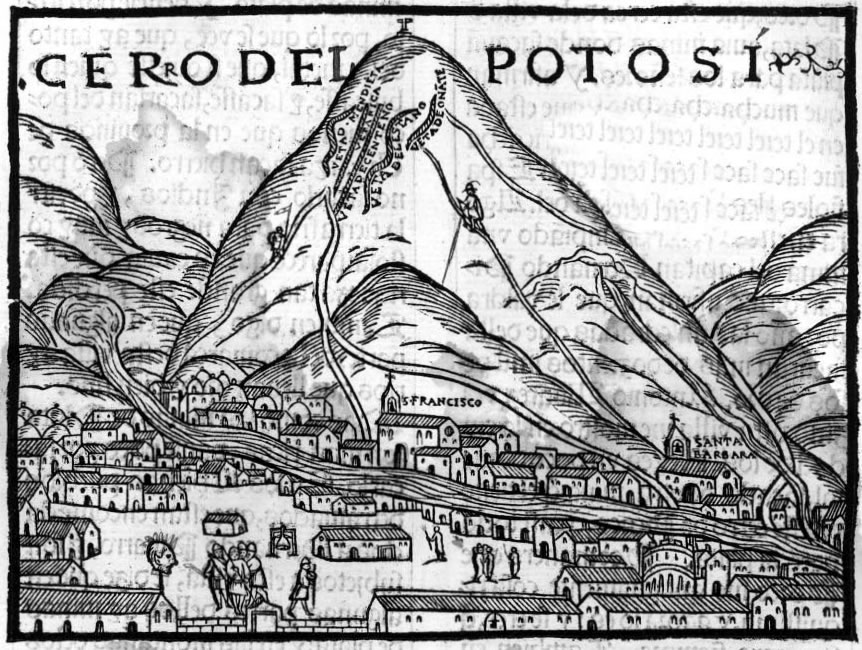
Potosi, discovered in 1545, produced massive amounts of silver from a single site in upper Peru. The first image published in Europe. Pedro Cieza de León, 1553.

Vast amounts of silver were brought into the possession of the crowns of Europe after the conquest of the Americas from the now Mexican state of Zacatecas (discovered in 1546) and Potosí (also discovered in 1546), which triggered the Spanish Price Revolution in Europe. Between 1500 and 1800, Bolivia, Peru, and Mexico made of 85% of the world's total silver production. Silver mining required large amounts of mercury to extract the metal from ore. In the Andes, the source was the Huancavelica mercury mine; Mexico was dependent on mercury from the Almadén mercury mine in Spain. Mercury had a high adverse environmental impact. Silver was extremely valuable in China, and became a global commodity. Manila galleons carried Spanish dollars across the Pacific, contributing to the rise of the Spanish Empire. The rise and fall of its value affected the world market.

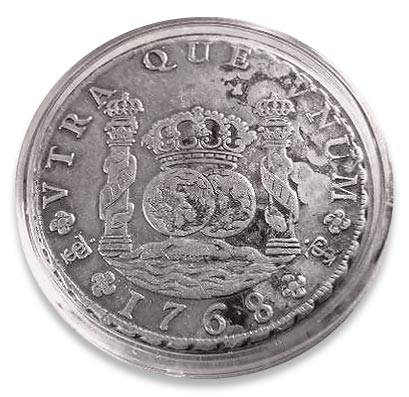
Silver Spanish real from the silver of Potosí, Bolivia. The amount of silver mined at Potosí and other locations in the Spanish Empire led to significant inflation in Europe.

In the first half of the 19th century Chilean mining revived due to a silver rush in the Norte Chico region, leading to an increased presence of Chileans in the Atacama desert and a shift away from an agriculture based economy.

The country of Argentina was named after its silver resources by Spanish conquistadors; Argentina is a Spanish adjective meaning "silvery".

Silver mining was a driving force in the settlement of western North America, with major booms for silver and associated minerals (lead, mostly) in the galena ore silver is most commonly found in. Notable silver rushes were in Colorado; Nevada; Cobalt, Ontario; California and the Kootenay region of British Columbia; notably in the Boundary and "Silvery" Slocan. A silver rush in Idaho produced mines in an area known as Silver Valley, a handful of which are still active today. The first major silver ore deposits in the United States were discovered at the Comstock Lode in Virginia City, Nevada, in 1859. By the 1870s, silver production had increased from 40 millions ounces per year to 80 million.

From 1872 to 1920, a surge of technological innovation increased global silver production to 120 million ounces produced per year. New silver deposits had been discovered in Australia, Canada, United States, Africa, Mexico, Chile, and Japan, and by the end of 1920, global production surged to 190 million ounces annually. The mining techniques during the 1900s had also dramatically changed. Seam-assisted drilling, mine dewatering, and improved haulage all contributed to the spike in silver production in the 1900s. By 2019, technological innovation has allowed silver production to grow to almost 800 million ounces per year.

== Environmental effects of silver mining ==
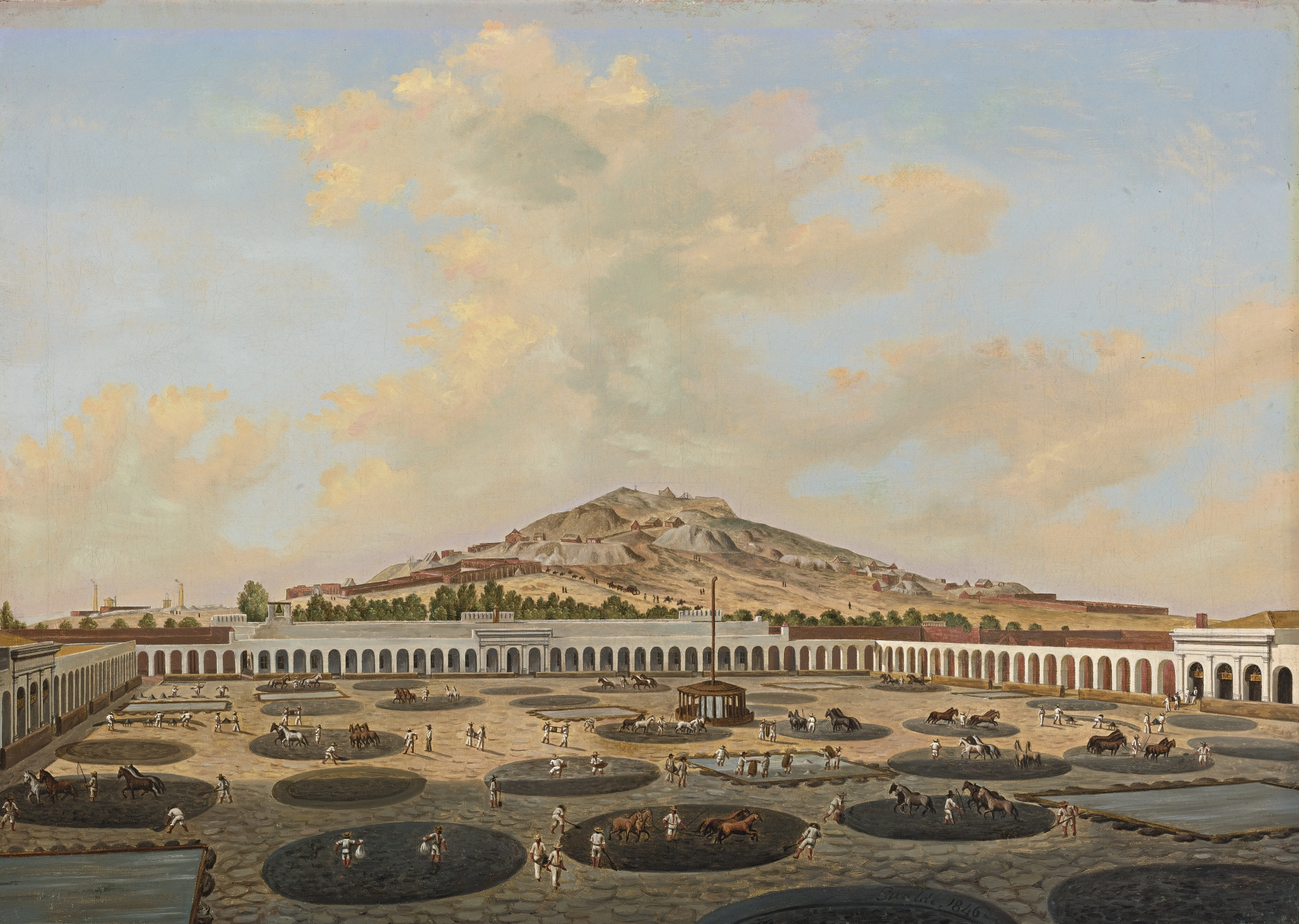
Depiction of the patio process at the Hacienda Nueva de Fresnillo, Zacatecas, Pietro Gualdi, 1846.

=== Mercury amalgamation ===
Mercury amalgamation is a technique used to extract gold and silver from lower-grade ores. Mercury quickly sticks to gold and silver and forms pasty amalgams, making extraction easier. After separating it from the ore, amalgam is roasted and mercury vapor escapes into the atmosphere and also makes its way into rivers and soils. From the years 1545 to 1803, over 25,000 tons of silver were produced using amalgamation in the Potosi mines. At its peak, the town had over 6,000 smelting furnaces spreading toxic Mercury. Mercury-rich tailings are also often left in mines.

The amalgamation methods have proven problematic. It is estimated that 90% of the mercury consumed in the United States from 1850 to 1900 was used to extract silver and gold. An estimated 257,400 tonnes of mercury were lost to the environment in this process in the Americas since the patio process was first used. 60–65% of this is likely released into the atmosphere, being the single largest contributor to the global mercury cycle.

In the year 2000, small-scale miners in Chile experienced many risks to their health, safety, and hygiene from toxic pollution. This was due to wastewater being released into underground waters and creating significant quantities of mercury.

Contaminants are also known to enter drinking water in and around abandoned silver mines. Well water in South Morelos State, Mexico, was found to have high concentrations of toxic minerals including arsenic, iron, manganese, lead, and fluorine. This is attributed to the abandoned and flooded silver mine at Huautla. Groundwaters flooded the mine-shafts after they were abandoned in the early 1990s, which allowed for oxidation and mobilization of these dangerous contaminants.

=== Effects of silver mining on Indigenous communities ===
Mining has negative impacts on both humans and societies. It affects Indigenous peoples living in communities nearby silver mines in many ways. Mine work puts a significant amount of mental stress on indigenous workers due to long hours, rough working conditions, repetitive nature of the work, roster schedules, and potential job loss.

The use of addictive substances is also an active concern amongst indigenous workers. Well-paid workers are more likely to buy alcohol and binge drink. This leads to various health effects such as cirrhosis of the liver, brain damage, and fetal alcohol syndrome.

Silver mining operations in indigenous communities lead to increased hunting pressure and a decline in traditional practices due to population growth and better hunting technologies. This affects local animal populations and cultural rituals. People spend time at the mine rather than in traditional activities like hunting and fishing, which threaten the spreading of ecological knowledge and cultural practices. While mining can provide economic resources for purchasing hunting equipment, it also accelerates the decline in traditional lifestyles and cultural heritage, impacting food security and community cohesion in indigenous populations.

Mining projects also pose significant threats to family integrity, manifesting in decreased quality and quantity of family life due to long working hours and associated stressors, as well as disruptions to traditional familial roles and responsibilities. Limited time for communication and support may exacerbate existing problems within families. This leads to fragmentation and potential conflicts, with spouses having increased household responsibilities and children facing adverse consequences such as behavioral issues and academic struggles.

Silver mining in indigenous communities lead to social change with Western values often replacing traditional ones. While some argue that mining can promote cultural values such as independence and pride through job creation and increased disposable income, others highlight negative impacts such as the loss of traditional languages, attributed to factors like migration, labor market participation, and lack of educational support.

== See also ==
- Silver mining in the United States
- Global silver trade from the 16th to 19th centuries
- Spanish treasure fleet
- Spanish Silver Train
- Royal fifth
- Patio process
- Lists of countries by mineral production
