= Río Blanco mine =

Copper mine in Peru

- Location: Loreto Region, Peru
- Products: Copper, molybdenum

The Río Blanco mine is a large copper mine located in the north of Peru in Loreto Region. Río Blanco represents one of the largest copper reserve in Peru and in the world having estimated reserves of 1.26 billion tonnes of ore grading 0.4% copper.

== See also ==
- List of mines in Peru
