= List of mines in Peru =

This is a list of mines in Peru.

	Name	Primary extract
1	Antamina mine	copper
2	Arcata mine	silver
3	Azuca mine	silver
4	Bayóvar mine	phosphate
5	Berenguela mine	silver
6	Cañariaco Norte mine	copper
7	Cerro Verde mine	copper
8	Cerro Corona mine	gold and copper
9	Chucapaca mine	gold
10	Corani mine	silver
11	Costancia mine	copper
12	Crespo mine	silver
13	Cuajone mine	copper
14	Galeno mine	copper
15	Haquira mine	copper
16	Huaron mine	silver
17	Lagunas Norte mine	gold
18	Las Bambas copper mine	copper
19	Lily Mine	silver
20	Los Chancas mine	copper
21	Mantaro mine	phosphate
22	Marcona mine	iron
23	Morococha mine	silver
24	Pallancata mine	silver
25	Quellaveco mine	copper
26	Río Blanco mine	copper
27	Rio Huaypetue mine	gold
28	San Rafael mine	tin
29	Santa Ana mine	silver
30	Tia Maria mine	copper
31	Tintaya mine	copper
32	Toquepala mine	copper
33	Toromocho mine	copper
