= Los Chancas mine =

Copper mine in Apurímac, Peru

- Location within Peru
- Location: Apurímac, Peru; 14°10′12″S 73°07′08″W
- Products: Copper, gold, molybdenum
- Discovered: 1999
- Company: Southern Copper Corporation

The Los Chancas mine is a large copper mine located in the Apurímac Region of southern Peru. Los Chancas represents one of the largest copper reserves in Peru and in the world, having an estimated 726 million tonnes of ore grading 0.47% copper, 0.04% molybdenum and 0.9 million oz of gold. Mining operations are expected to begin in 2027.

On May 31, 2022, the mining company accused that artisanal copper miners in the area caused "in part" a fire to break out at the mine.

== See also ==
- List of mines in Peru
- Copper mining
- Pirquinero
- Pallaqueo
