= Antamina mine =

Mine in Peru

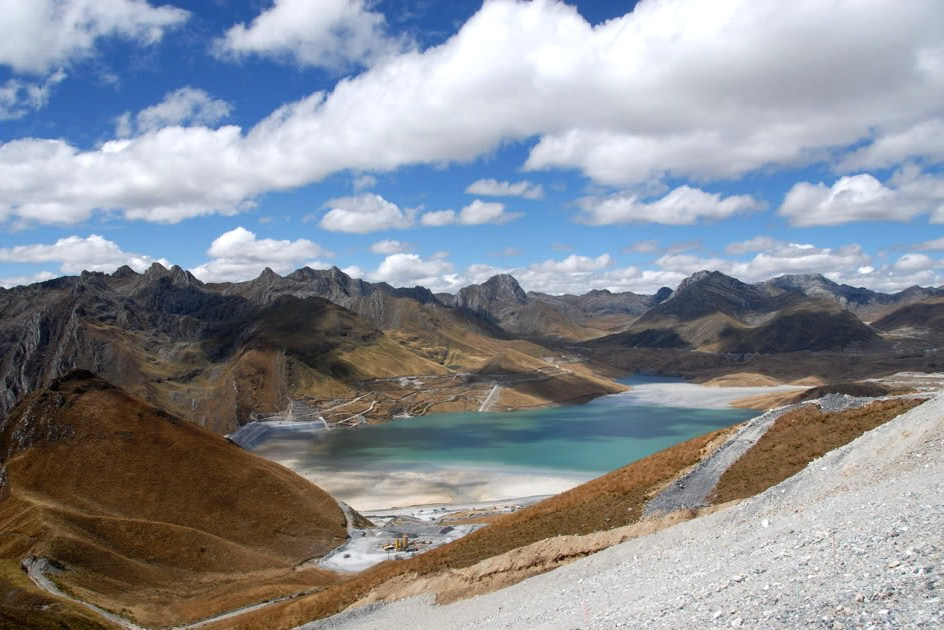
- Tailings pond at the Antamina mine

- Location within Peru
- Location: Ancash, Peru; 9.5372°S 77.0611°W
- Products: Copper, zinc, molybdenum
- Type: Open-pit
- Opened: October 1, 2001
- Company: Teck Resources (22.5%), BHP (33.75%), Glencore (33.75%), Mitsubishi Corporation (10%)
- Website: www.antamina.com

The Antamina mine in the Andes Mountains of Peru is one of the largest copper/zinc mines in the world. It is an open pit mine which had an estimated life of mine at 15 years. It also produced molybdenum. The mine is jointly owned by Teck Resources, BHP, Glencore, and Mitsubishi Corporation and independently operated by Compañía Minera Antamina S.A. It produced 390,800 tons of copper concentrate in 2006, 461,000 tons in 2013, 410,000 tons (15% of the country’s total production) in 2024. The total capital expenditure of the mine by 2013 was US$2.3 billion. İt is located at an altitude of 4,300 meters above sea level.

In 2014, unionized mine workers went on strike over pay and benefits.

On April 22, 2025, a senior operations manager died in an accident in the mine.

== History ==
At the time of its development, the mine was Peru's largest investment project at $2.3 billion. Part of the country's dependence on mining, it was expected to raise exports by $900 million.

In 2010, the mine underwent an expansion program that increased its processing capacity by 31%.

As of March 2023, the mine is expected to shut down in 2028. A $2 billion investment to extend the lifespan to 2036 is underway pending approval of an environmental impact study.

== Local relations ==
Many residents of land that is now the mine sold their property in the hopes that the mine would uplift the local economy, but there was little effect to jobs or infrastructure. Villagers living nearby complain that dust thrown up by the mine is toxic. Other potential sources of pollution to the local community come in the form of toxic materials stored in mine tailings. Mine officials, along with President Ollanta Humala, denied that the mine was unsafe.

In November 2021, the rural Aquia community blockaded the mine's operations. Protestors alleged that the mine had not fully paid the community for the land, which the company disputed.

The company launched an initiative, FOGEL, with the stated aim of strengthening the capacities of local governments and communities.

== See also ==
- Antamina Tailings Dam
- Zinc mining
- List of mines in Peru
- Copper mining
