= Zinc mining =

Mining for zinc

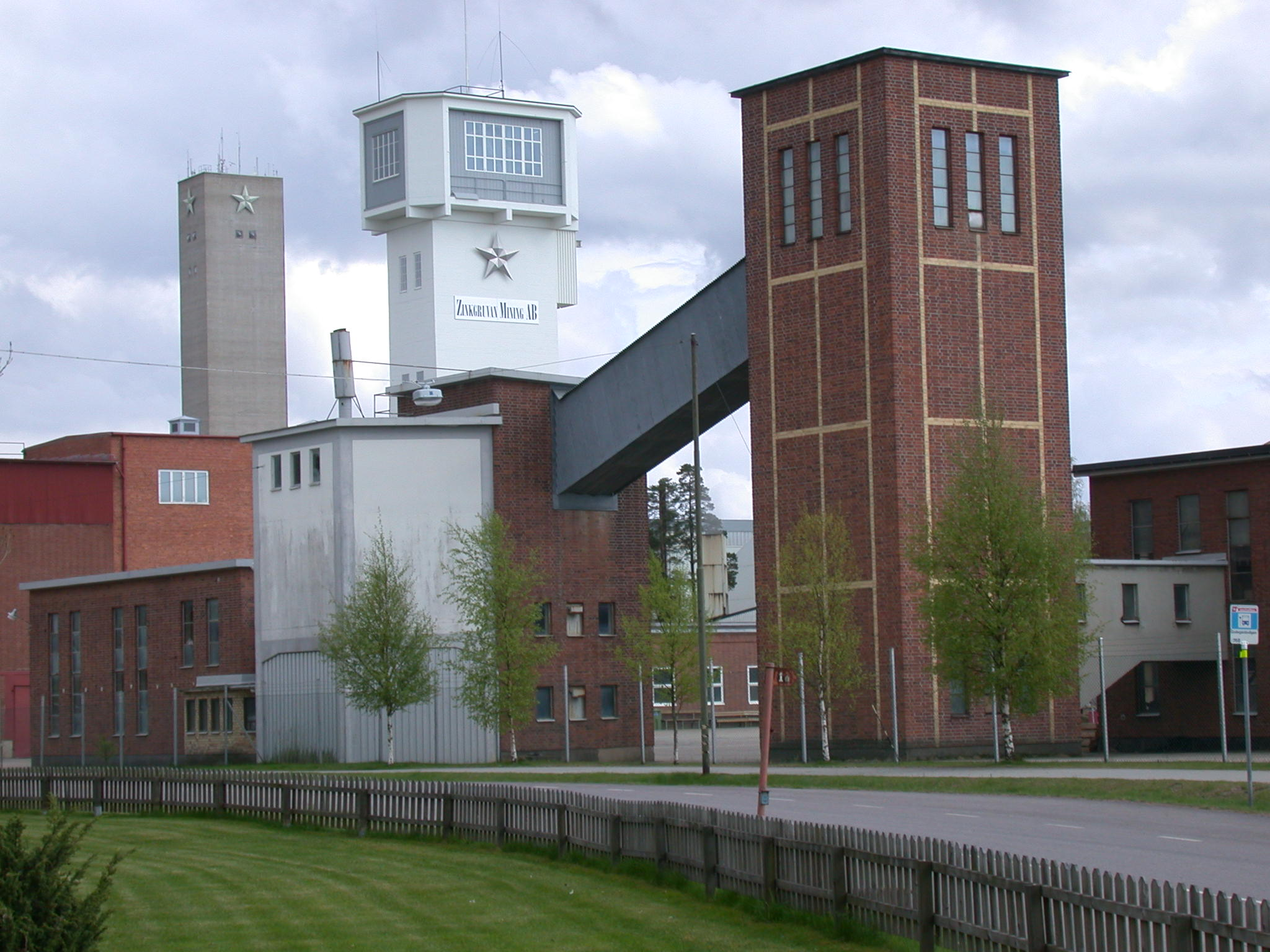
Zinkgruvan, a zinc mine in Askersund Municipality, Sweden

Zinc mining is the process by which mineral forms of the metal zinc are extracted from the earth through mining. A zinc mine is a mine that produces zinc minerals in ore as its primary product. Common co-products in zinc ores include minerals of lead and silver. Other mines may produce zinc minerals as a by-product of the production of ores containing more valuable minerals or metals, such as gold, silver or copper. Mined ore is processed, usually on site, to produce one or more metal-rich concentrates, then transported to a zinc smelter for production of zinc metal.

Global zinc mine production in 2020 was estimated to be 12 million tonnes. The largest producers were China (35%), Australia (12%), Peru (10%), India (6.0%), United States (5.6%) and Mexico (5.0%), with Australia having the largest reserves.

The world's largest zinc mine is the Red Dog open-pit zinc-lead-silver mine in Alaska, with 4.2% of world production. Major zinc mine operators include Vedanta Resources, Glencore, BHP, Teck Resources, Sumitomo, Nexa Resources, Boliden AB, and China Minmetals.

== History ==
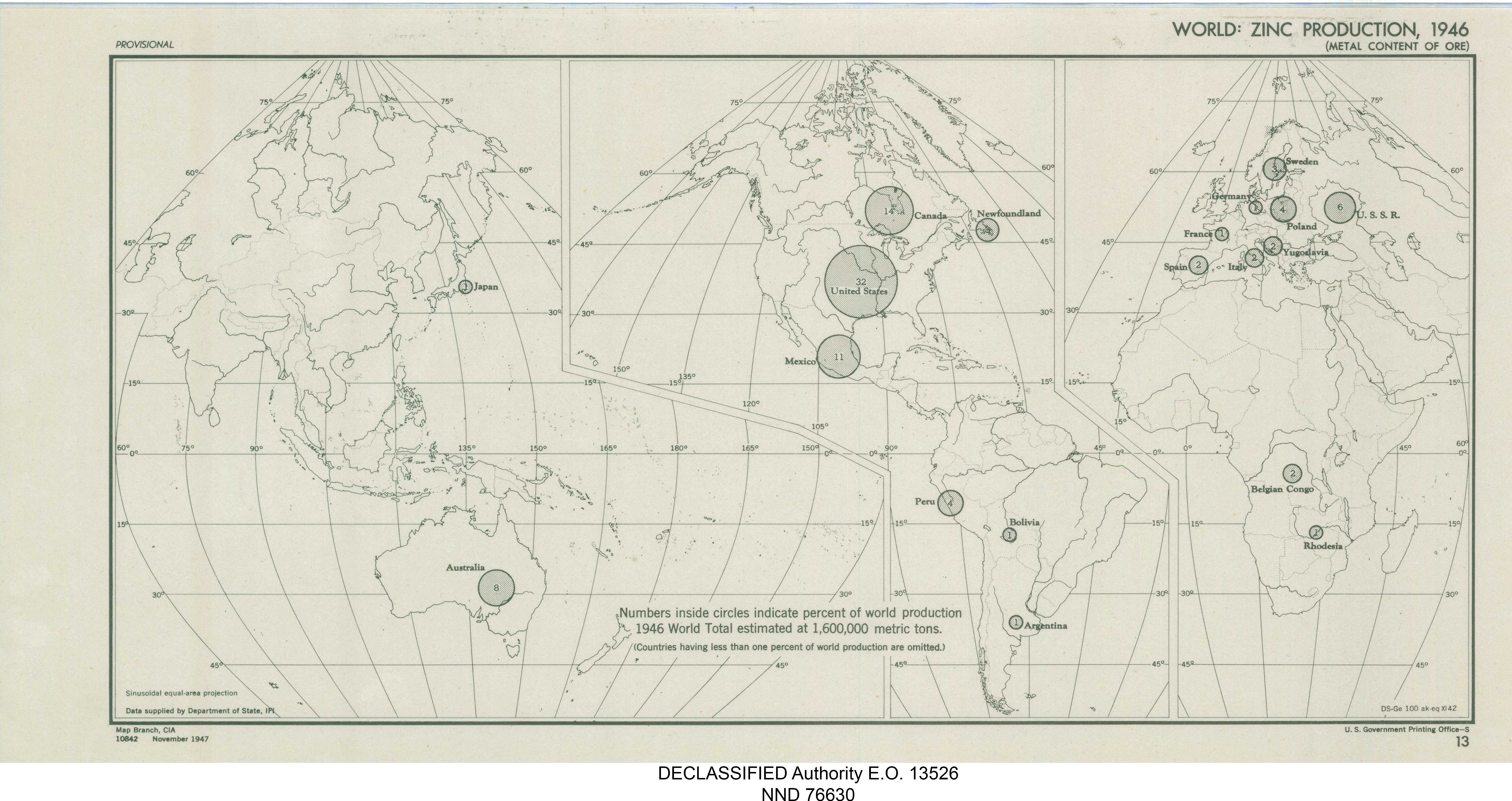
World zinc production, 1946

Zinc deposits have been exploited for thousands of years: the oldest known zinc mine, in Rajasthan, India, was established nearly 2000 years BP.

Pure zinc was produced in the 9th century AD; earlier in antiquity zinc was primarily used to alloy with copper to produce brass. This is because it is difficult to isolate zinc metal from its ore. At the temperature zinc is released from its ore it also vaporizes into a gas, and if the furnace is not airtight, the gaseous zinc reacts with the air to form zinc oxide.

Metallic zinc was smelted in the 9th century BC in India, followed by China 300 years later, and in Europe by 1738 AD. The methods of smelting in China and India were most likely independently developed, while the method of smelting developed in Europe was likely derived from the Indian method.

== Modern uses ==
Primary modern uses for zinc
Use	Approx % worldwide
Coating iron and steel in order to prevent their corrosion (galvanization)	50%
Production of brass: the zinc is alloyed with copper in ratios of 20%–40% zinc.	20%
Production of zinc alloys: the zinc is combined with varying proportions of aluminium and magnesium.	15%
Various other industries, as an agricultural fertilizer and as a human food supplement.	15%

== Methods of extraction ==
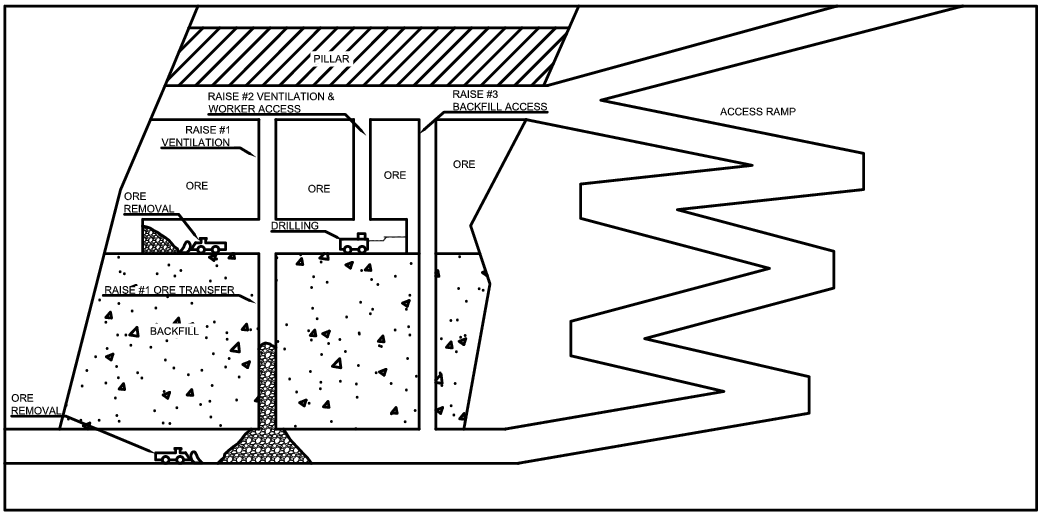
Schematic cut and fill mining

Zinc is mined both at the surface and at depth. Surface mining of zinc is typically used for oxide ores, while underground mining yields zinc sulfide ores. Some of the common methods of zinc mining are open pit mining, open stope, and cut and fill mining:

Open-pit mining: Surface mining involves the removal of waste rock from above an ore deposit before it can be extracted. Once the waste overburden is removed, ore and waste are then mined in parallel, primarily using track-mounted excavators and rubber-tired trucks. In smaller scale operations, front loaders may be used.

Open Stope mining: This is a method of underground mining where ore bodies are completely removed leaving sizeable caverns (stopes) within the mine. Open stope mining leaves these caverns with no additional bracing or external support; instead the cavern walls are supported by random pillars of ore which have not been removed.

Cut and Fill stoping: A method of underground mining which removes ore from below the deposit. The stope is then filled with waste rock to replace the mined out ore to support the stope walls, and to provide an elevated floor for the miners and equipment to further extract ore from the deposit.

== Production ==
Global mine production of zinc in 2019 was 12.9 million tonnes, a 0.9% increase from 2018, with the increase primarily attributed to increased output from zinc mines in Australia and South Africa.

In 2020, production of zinc is expected to rise 3.7% to 13.99 million tonnes, with the increase due to increased production of zinc by China and India.

In 2019 global demand for refined zinc exceeded supply and resulted in a deficit of 0.178 million tonnes, while in 2020 there is an expected surplus of 0.192 million tonnes.

Major zinc producing countries ranked by their output for 2023
Country	Output (million tonnes)	Share of world production
China	4	33%
Peru	1.4	12%
Australia	1.1	9%
India	0.86	7%
USA	0.75	6%
Mexico	0.69	6%
Bolivia	0.49	4%
Other countries	2.71	23%

== Environmental impact ==
Research on the health of the benthic macroinvertebrate populations in the mining areas of southeastern Missouri, USA, have yielded a wealth of information on the effects of zinc mining on its local environment. Fish and crayfish populations in localities near mining sites have been observed to be much lower than other populations found in reference sites; and the crayfish tissues have much higher metal concentrations than their reference counterparts. It was also found that mussel populations near lead-zinc mining areas had reduced biomass, and were less specious than those found in reference sites. Concentrations of metals 10-60% higher than reference have been reported in plant tissues. Immediately downstream of mining activity, a reduction in biotic condition of macroinvertebrates by 10%-58% have been observed, with the ecosystem having an impaired ability to support its populations when compared to other reference sites.

Benthic macro-invertebrates such as crayfish and mussels represent a pathway for biomagnification, where the concentration of noxious materials within organisms at higher trophic levels accumulates as a result of consuming contaminated prey. In addition, benthic macroinvertebrate populations are frequently used as indicators of overall ecosystem health.

Soil samples from agricultural areas near a lead-zinc mining region in Guangxi, China have shown a "serious pollution level" of zinc in paddy fields relatively close to the mining area, and a "moderate pollution level" in the aerated fields relatively further away. The research also indicated that their Nemerow synthetic index assessment showed that the region under study is not fit for agricultural purposes. Other investigation into the effect of zinc mining on agricultural soils in the Heilongjiang Province of China has found that the soils were "moderately contaminated", and the population and diversity of the bacterial assemblages within the soils were significantly reduced, with reduced activity of soil enzymes. The activity of the bacteria and enzymes help plant matter to take up nutrients, decompose decaying matter, and in other ecosystem interactions. Their reduction and impaired effectiveness result in poorer agricultural productivity.

== Zinc mines ==
The world's ten largest zinc producing mines (by tonnes of zinc)
Name	Country	Owner(s)	Production (tonnes)	Year and ref.	Operations
Red Dog	USA	Teck Resources	552,400	(2019)	Open-pit zinc-lead-silver mine
Rampura Agucha	India	Vedanta Resources (64.9%); Government of India (29.5%)	357,571	(2019)	Underground zinc-lead-silver mine
Mount Isa	Australia	Glencore	326,400	(2019)	George Fisher and Lady Loretta underground lead-zinc-silver mines
Antamina	Peru	BHP (33.75%); Glencore (33.75%); Teck Resources (22.5%); Mitsubishi Corporation (10%)	303,555	(2019)	Open-pit copper-zinc-molybdenum mine
McArthur River	Australia	Glencore	271,200	(2019)	Open-pit zinc-lead-silver mine
San Cristóbal	Bolivia	Sumitomo Corporation	206,100	(2019)	Open-pit silver-lead-zinc mine
Dugald River	Australia	China Minmetals	170,057	(2019)	Underground cut and fill stoping
Vazante	Brazil	Nexa Resources	139,000	(2019)	Underground and open pit zinc-lead-silver mine
Cerro Lindo	Peru	Nexa Resources	126,000	(2019)	Underground zinc-lead-copper-silver mine
Tara	Ireland	Boliden AB	122,463	(2019)	Underground zinc-lead mine

== See also ==
- Zinc mining in the United States
