= List of senators of Alpes-Maritimes =

Location of Alpes-Maritimes in France

Following is a list of senators of Alpes-Maritimes, people who have represented the department of Alpes-Maritimes in the Senate of France.

== Third Republic ==
Senators for Alpes-Maritimes under the French Third Republic were:

Term	Name
1876–1882	Joseph Garnier
1876–1885	Charles Dieudé-Defly
1882–1900	Léon Chiris
1885–1894	Léon Renault
1894–1902	Alfred Borriglione
1900–1903	Charles Bérenger
1902–1911	Maurice Rouvier
1903–1922	Honoré Sauvan
1922–1926	Jean Amic
1922–1929	Flaminius Raiberti
1926–1937	Eugène Charabot
1929–1933	Alfred Donadei
1933–1938	Antonin Gianotti
1937–1940	Louis Louis-Dreyfus
1939–1944	Jean Médecin

== Fourth Republic ==
Senators for Alpes-Maritimes under the French Fourth Republic were:

Term	Name
1946–1955	Antoine Giacomoni
1946–1948	Jean Laurenti
1946–1959	Alex Roubert
1946–1948	Georges Salvago
1948–1959	Léon Teisseire
1955–1959	Joseph Raybaud

== Fifth Republic ==
Senators for Alpes-Maritimes under the French Fifth Republic:

Term	Name	Group	Notes
1959–1962	Émile Hugues	Gauche Démocratique	
1959–1962	Joseph Raybaud	Rassemblement Démocratique et Européen	
1959–1962	Alex Roubert	Socialiste	
1962–1971	Émile Hugues	Gauche Démocratique	Died in office 10 February 1966
1962–1971	Paul Massa	Gauche Démocratique	From 11 February 1966 in place of Émile Hugues
1962–1971	Alex Roubert	Socialiste	
1962–1971	Joseph Raybaud	Rassemblement Démocratique et Européen	
1971–1980	Victor Robini	Gauche Démocratique	
1971–1980	Francis Palmero	Union Centriste	
1971–1980	Joseph Raybaud	Rassemblement Démocratique et Européen	
1980–1989	Joseph Raybaud	Rassemblement Démocratique et Européen	
1980–1989	Francis Palmero	Union Centriste	Died in office 13 May 1985
1980–1989	Pierre Laffitte	Rassemblement Démocratique et Social Européen	From 14 May 1985 in place of Francis Palmero
1980–1989	Pierre Merli	Gauche Démocratique	Until 24 June 1988 (elected deputy)
1980–1989	Charles Ginésy	Union pour un Mouvement Populaire	From 11 September 1988 (by-election)
1980–1989	Victor Robini	Gauche Démocratique	Died in office 25 December 1984
1980–1989	José Balarello	Union pour un Mouvement Populaire	From 26 December 1984 in place of Victor Robini
1989–1998	Honoré Bailet	Rassemblement pour la République	
1989–1998	José Balarello	Union pour un Mouvement Populaire	
1989–1998	Charles Ginésy	Union pour un Mouvement Populaire	
1989–1998	Pierre Laffitte	Rassemblement Démocratique et Social Européen	
1998–2008	Jacques Peyrat	Union pour un Mouvement Populaire	
1998–2008	José Balarello	Union pour un Mouvement Populaire	
1998–2008	Charles Ginésy	Union pour un Mouvement Populaire	
1998–2008	Pierre Laffitte	Rassemblement Démocratique et Social Européen	
2008–2014	Jean-Pierre Leleux	Les Républicains	
2008–2014	Colette Giudicelli	Les Républicains	
2008–2014	Louis Nègre	Les Républicains	
2008–2014	René Vestri	Union pour un Mouvement Populaire	Died in office 6 February 2013
2008–2014	Hélène Masson-Maret	Union pour un Mouvement Populaire	From 7 February 2013 in place of René Vestri
2008–2014	Marc Daunis	Socialiste et républicain	
2014–present	Marc Daunis	Socialiste et républicain	
2014–present	Dominique Estrosi Sassone	Les Républicains	
2014–present	Colette Giudicelli	Les Républicains	
2014–present	Jean-Pierre Leleux	Les Républicains	
2014–present	Louis Nègre	Les Républicains	Resigned 30 September 2017
2014–present	Henri Leroy	Les Républicains	From 1 October 2017 in place of Louis Nègre

== Sources ==
- Liste des anciens sénateurs de la IIIème République par circonscription (in French), Sénat de France
- Liste des anciens sénateurs de la IVème République par circonscription (in French), Sénat de France
- Liste des anciens sénateurs de la Vème République par circonscription (in French), Sénat de France
- Liste par département – Alpes-Maritimes (in French), Sénat de France

Senators of the Alpes-Maritimes department of France.
