= Conga Project =

Mining project in Northern Peru

Coordinates: 6.0842°S 78.3616°W

Conga Project is a gold mining and copper mining project in Cajamarca Region of Northern Peru. It is a project of Minera Yanacocha, a company mainly owned by Newmont Mining Corporation.

== Overview ==
The Conga Mine is a project of Minera Yanacocha, a company mainly owned by Newmont Mining Corporation and Buenaventura, a Peruvian mining company, and the International Finance Corporation, the private-lending arm of the World Bank. It was expected to yield 680,000 ounces of gold and 235 million pounds of copper per year for the first five years.

== History ==
The Conga Environmental Impact Assessment was originally approved in 2010. It was suspended in November 2011. In April 2012, President Ollanta Humala, who had been elected after promising to place "water over gold", said that the project needed a number of changes to proceed. Protesters expressed concerns about perceived impacts of the project on the local water supply.

Farmers protested against the project. Demonstrations ceased after President Ollanta Humala on December 4, 2012 granted the country's armed forces extra power for 60 days, including the right to make arrests without warrant. Opponents of the project pointed to risks for ecosystem and water resources. The conflict had the result that several of President Ollanta Humala's ministers resigned. It also resulted in the death of several Peruvians. This was the first crisis of the Humala administration.

In April 2016, Máxima Acuña received the Goldman Environmental Prize for her environmental advocacy and peaceful resistance regarding the Conga Mine Project.

In 2016, the project was abandoned, in part due to the environmental concerns.
