= 2024 French legislative election in Alpes-Maritimes =

Following the first round of the 2024 French legislative election on 30 June 2024, runoff elections in each constituency where no candidate received a vote share greater than 50 percent were scheduled for 7 July. Candidates permitted to stand in the runoff elections needed to either come in first or second place in the first round or achieve more than 12.5 percent of the votes of the entire electorate (as opposed to 12.5 percent of the vote share due to low turnout).

== Alpes-Maritimes ==
=== 1st constituency ===
Candidate	Party or alliance		First round		Second round	
Candidate	Party or alliance		Votes	%	Votes	%
Éric Ciotti	Union of the far right	The Republicans	20,809	41.04	22,584	45.14
Olivier Salerno	New Popular Front	La France Insoumise	13,499	26.62	16,077	32.13
Graig Monetti	Ensemble	Horizons	11,558	22.79	11,374	22.73
Virgile Vanier-Guérin	The Republicans		2,933	5.78		
Lalla Chama Ben Moulay	Ecologists	Independent	1,427	2.81		
Alain Langouet	Far-left	Lutte Ouvrière	313	0.62		
Jean-Claude Wahid Spach	Regionalists	Independent	136	0.27		
Maxime Bovis	Independent		34	0.07		
Total			50,709	100.00	50,035	100.00
Valid votes			50,709	98.01		
Invalid votes			362	0.70		
Blank votes			667	1.29		
Total votes			51,738	100.00		
Registered voters/turnout			81,879	63.19		

=== 2nd constituency ===
Candidate	Party or alliance		First round		Second round	
Candidate	Party or alliance		Votes	%	Votes	%
Lionel Tivoli	National Rally		28,676	48.08	28,409	65.50
Leïla Tonnerre	New Popular Front	La France Insoumise	11,339	19.01	14,964	34.50
David Varrone	Ensemble	Horizons	9,856	16.53		
Simon Darragone	The Republicans		6,162	10.33		
Patrice Miran	Ecologists	Independent	2,296	3.85		
Indiana Poret-Rinck	Far-right	Independent	931	1.56		
Florent Imbert	Far-left	Lutte Ouvrière	381	0.64		
Total			59,641	100.00	43,373	100.00
Valid votes			59,641	97.66		
Invalid votes			430	0.70		
Blank votes			996	1.63		
Total votes			61,067	100.00		
Registered voters/turnout			90,381	67.57		

=== 3rd constituency ===
Candidate	Party or alliance		First round		Second round	
Candidate	Party or alliance		Votes	%	Votes	%
Bernard Chaix	Union of the far right	The Republicans	23,983	41.47	28,884	53.71
Laure Quignard	New Popular Front	Socialist Party	15,754	27.24	24,897	46.29
Philippe Pradal	Ensemble	Horizons	14,670	25.36	0	0.00
Marie Françoise Caussin	Ecologists	Independent	1,675	2.90		
Thibault Delhez	Sovereigntist right	Debout la France	883	1.53		
Estelle Jaquet	Far-left	Lutte Ouvrière	438	0.76		
Marjorie Vivo	Ecologists	Independent	434	0.75		
Total			57,837	100.00	53,781	100.00
Valid votes			57,837	98.01	53,781	93.57
Invalid votes			412	0.70	794	1.38
Blank votes			763	1.29	2,904	5.05
Total votes			59,012	100.00	57,479	100.00
Registered voters/turnout			91,724	64.34	91,728	62.66

=== 4th constituency ===
Candidate	Party or alliance		Votes	%
Alexandra Masson	National Rally		30,528	56.27
Anne-Pascale Guedon	Ensemble	Renaissance	11,190	20.63
Virginie Parent	New Popular Front	Communist Party	9,861	18.18
Christine Beyl	Ecologists	Independent	1,717	3.17
Joseph Markiel	Far-left	Lutte Ouvrière	953	1.76
Total			54,249	100.00
Valid votes			54,249	97.10
Invalid votes			637	1.14
Blank votes			985	1.76
Total votes			55,871	100.00
Registered voters/turnout			85,660	65.22

=== 5th constituency ===
Candidate	Party or alliance		Votes	%
Christelle d'Intorni	Union of the far right	The Republicans	29,804	50.35
Fabrice Decoupigny	New Popular Front	The Ecologists	12,233	20.66
Gaël Nofri	Ensemble	Horizons	8,473	14.31
Patrice Benoit	Independent		6,375	10.77
Axel Hvidsten	Ecologists	Independent	1,876	3.17
Agnès Benkemoun	Far-left	Lutte Ouvrière	436	0.74
Total			59,197	100.00
Valid votes			59,197	97.34
Invalid votes			503	0.83
Blank votes			1,114	1.83
Total votes			60,814	100.00
Registered voters/turnout			91,232	66.66

=== 6th constituency ===
Candidate	Party or alliance		Votes	%
Bryan Masson	National Rally		27,705	50.85
Laurence Trastour-Isnart	The Republicans		16,213	29.76
Nicole Mazzella	New Popular Front	La France Insoumise	8,281	15.20
Pierre Piacenti	Ecologists	Independent	1,927	3.54
Daniele Bartoli	Far-left	Lutte Ouvrière	359	0.66
Total			54,485	100.00
Valid votes			54,485	97.83
Invalid votes			231	0.41
Blank votes			980	1.76
Total votes			55,696	100.00
Registered voters/turnout			80,186	69.46

=== 7th constituency ===
Candidate	Party or alliance		First round		Second round	
Candidate	Party or alliance		Votes	%	Votes	%
Thierry Ferrand	National Rally		23,921	37.25	26,672	41.27
Eric Pauget	The Republicans		16,389	25.52	37,955	58.73
Aline Abravanel	Ensemble	Renaissance	11,510	17.92		
Arthur Meyer-Abbatucci	New Popular Front	La France Insoumise	10,974	17.09		
David Quintela	Reconquête		932	1.45		
Christian Petard	Far-left	Lutte Ouvrière	264	0.41		
Enzo Dewasmes	Independent		225	0.35		
Total			64,215	100.00	64,627	100.00
Valid votes			64,215	98.43	64,627	97.28
Invalid votes			261	0.40	276	0.42
Blank votes			761	1.17	1,534	2.31
Total votes			65,237	100.00	66,437	100.00
Registered voters/turnout			96,284	67.75	96,288	69.00

=== 8th constituency ===
Candidate	Party or alliance		First round		Second round	
Candidate	Party or alliance		Votes	%	Votes	%
Dorette Landerer	National Rally		23,010	42.74	25,278	47.43
Alexandra Martin	The Republicans		15,284	28.39	28,012	52.57
Lucia Soudant	New Popular Front	La France Insoumise	7,837	14.56		
Mike Castro Demaria	Ensemble	Renaissance	6,508	12.09		
Anne Itty	Ecologists	Independent	950	1.76		
Marie-José Pereira	Far-left	Lutte Ouvrière	181	0.34		
Christophe Neutzler	Miscellaneous centre	Independent	66	0.12		
Total			53,836	100.00	53,290	100.00
Valid votes			53,836	98.47	53,290	97.89
Invalid votes			257	0.47	240	0.44
Blank votes			581	1.06	906	1.66
Total votes			54,674	100.00	54,436	100.00
Registered voters/turnout			84,414	64.77	84,401	64.50

=== 9th constituency ===
Candidate	Party or alliance		First round		Second round	
Candidate	Party or alliance		Votes	%	Votes	%
Franck Galbert	National Rally		22,921	42.31	25,206	47.01
Michèle Tabarot	The Republicans		18,334	33.84	28,407	52.99
José Garcia Abia	New Popular Front	Socialist Party	9,987	18.43		
Henriette Palmers	Ecologists	Independent	1,742	3.22		
Sylvain Lienhardt	Far-right	Reconquête	900	1.66		
Liliane Pécout	Far-left	Lutte Ouvrière	294	0.54		
Total			54,178	100.00	53,613	100.00
Valid votes			54,178	98.33	53,613	97.03
Invalid votes			237	0.43	338	0.61
Blank votes			684	1.24	1,301	2.35
Total votes			55,099	100.00	55,252	100.00
Registered voters/turnout			82,396	66.87	83,404	66.25
