= Giudicelli =

Giudicelli is a Corsican surname. Notable people with the surname include:

- Christian Giudicelli (1942–2022), French novelist and literary critic
- Colette Giudicelli (1943–2020), French politician
- Fernando Giudicelli (1906–1968), Brazilian footballer
- Jean-Pierre Giudicelli (1943-2024), French pentathlete
- Paul Giudicelli (1921–1965), Dominican abstract painter

== See also ==
- Carlotta Giudicelli, a character in The Phantom of the Opera (1986)
- Guidicelli
