= Gabriel Tomatis =

French politician (born 1999)

Member of the National Assembly for Alpes-Maritimes's 4th constituency
- Incumbent
- Assumed office 22 April 2026
- Preceded by: Alexandra Masson

Personal details
- Born: 2 November 1999 (age 26) Nice, Alpes-Maritimes, France
- Party: National Rally
- Education: Côte d'Azur University

Gabriel Tomatis (born 2 November 1999) is a French politician, who is a National Rally member of parliament for Alpes-Maritimes's 4th constituency since April 2026.

== Biography ==
Gabriel Tomatis holds a master 1 in political history at the Côte d'Azur University. He was the substitute for National Rally MP Alexandra Masson, re-elected in the fourth constituency of Alpes-Maritimes in the 2024 snap parliamentary elections. She was elected mayor of Menton following the March 2026 municipal elections, which lead Gabriel Tomatis to take his seat in the National Assembly from then on 22 April 2026.
