= Bryan Masson =

French politician

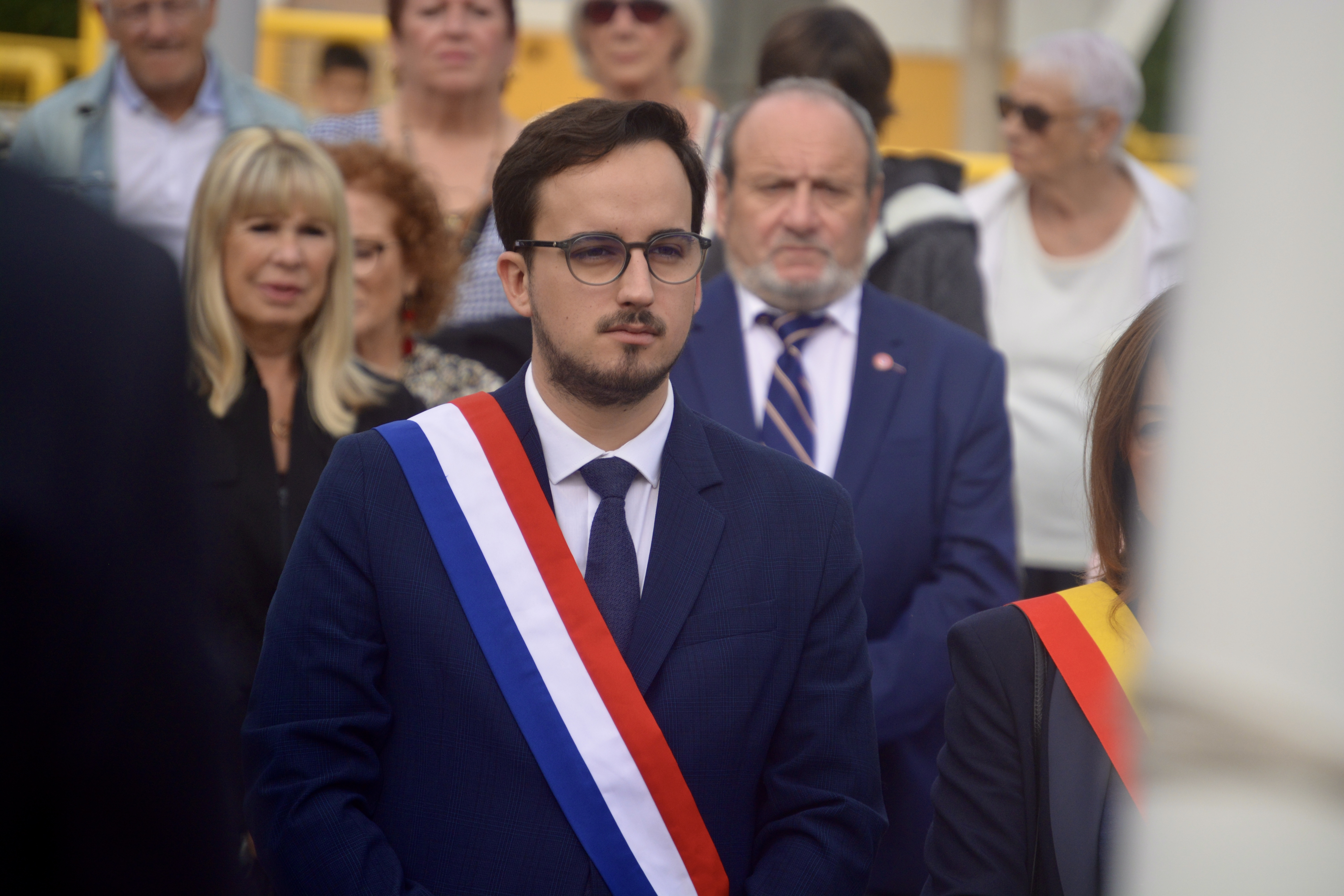

Member of the National Assembly for Alpes-Maritimes's 6th constituency
- Incumbent
- Assumed office 22 June 2022
- Preceded by: Laurence Trastour-Isnart

Personal details
- Born: 21 December 1996 (age 29) Cagnes sur Mer, France
- Party: National Rally

Bryan Masson (born 21 December 1996) is a French politician of the National Rally and a deputy in the National Assembly representing Alpes-Maritimes's 6th constituency.

Masson was born in Cagnes sur Mer. He worked as a civil servant and then an assistant for Frejus mayor David Rachline. Masson is also a regional councilor in Saint Laurent du Var.

During the 2022 French legislative election, he was elected to the seat of Alpes-Maritimes's 6th constituency in the second round. According to media reports ballot papers for Alexandra Masson, a fellow National Rally candidate standing in a neighbouring constituency, were offered in Bryan Masson's constituency until a voter alerted the authorities as the polls opened.

Since March 2026, he served as the mayor of Cagnes sur Mer.
