= Tomata =

Tomata may refer to:

- Tomata people, a historic ethnic group of South America
- Tomata District, Okayama, in Japan
- Tomata Dam, in Japan
- Tomata, Mori Atas, a village in North Morowali Regency, Indonesia
- Tomata du Plenty, American singer

== See also ==
- Tomato (disambiguation)
