= Alberto Benavides de la Quintana =

- Born: October 21, 1920; Lima, Peru
- Died: February 12, 2014 (aged 93); Lima, Peru
- Burial place: Lima, Peru
- Education: National University of Engineering (BS); Harvard University (MA)
- Occupations: Gold mining magnate and philanthropist
- Known for: Founding and leading the Compañia de Minas Buenaventura
- Spouse: Elsa Ganoza de la Torre (1945-2014, his death.)
- Children: Elsa Blanca, Alberto, Mercedes, Roque, and Raúl
- Parents: Alberto Benavides Diez Canseco; Blanca de la Quintana Cichero
- Relatives: Benavides family

Alberto Benavides de la Quintana (October 20, 1920 – February 12, 2014) was prominent Peruvian businessman and engineer, famous for founding the "Buenaventura Mining Company". After graduating from Universidad Nacional de Ingenieria in Lima, Peru, he went on to become the first Peruvian to graduate from the Harvard Graduate School of Arts and Sciences, in 1944. He was given the "Harvard Lifetime Achievement Award" in 2011, by the board of directors of the Harvard Club of Peru.

== Early life and education ==
Alberto Benavides de la Quintana was born on October 20, 1920, in Lima, Peru. His father. Alberto Benavides Diez Canseco, was a prominent lawyer and magistrate, and also brother of First Lady Francisca Benavides Diez Canseco (wife of president Óscar R. Benavides), and of María Benavides Diez Canseco (wife of renowned Polish architect Ricardo de Jaxa Malachowski). His mother, Blanca de la Quintana Cichero, was daughter of the former Minister of Finance Ismael de la Quintana Elías, and of Ángela Cichero Danely.

Benavides concluded his primary and secondary education at the Colegio de la Inmaculada of Lima, in 1936.

In 1945, he married Elsa Ganoza de la Torre, daughter of Vice President Eduardo Ganoza y Ganoza, and niece of Víctor Raúl Haya de la Torre, the founder and leader of the American Popular Revolutionary Alliance and the Peruvian Aprista Party. Five children were born from this marriage: Elsa Blanca Benavides Ganoza (wife of José Miguel Morales Dasso), Alberto Benavides Ganoza, Mercedes Benavides Ganoza, Roque Benavides Ganoza and Raúl Benavides Ganoza.

His higher studies were carried out in the old School of Engineers of Peru, today the National University of Engineering, graduating in 1941. He was awarded a scholarship by the Cerro de Pasco Corporation for a master's degree in geology at Harvard University. He was the first Peruvian to graduate from Harvard Graduate School of Arts and Sciences, in 1944.

== Career ==
Subsequently, upon his graduation from Harvard, he was hired at the Cerro de Pasco Corporation, where he worked until 1953. That same year, he founded the Buenaventura Mining Company, thus beginning the exploration of the Julcani silver mine. Later, the Recuperada, Uchuchaccua and Orcopampa mines were incorporated.

After eleven years, the Cerro de Pasco Corporation named him chief executive officer of the company, and seven years later he left this position and accepted the invitation of the Pontifical Catholic University of Peru to organize the Mining Section of the Faculty of Sciences and Engineering.

Between 1953 and 1964 and from 1971 to 2001, he served as General Manager of Buenaventura, which became the first Latin American mining company to be listed in the New York Stock Exchange, since 1996. He was also general director, as well as chairman of the board, from 1981 to 2011, when he transferred the position to his son Roque Benavides Ganoza.

Alberto Benavides de la Quintana offered his professional skills in the management of important institutions such as the Geological Society of Peru (1961–1963 and 1974–1975), the Mining Scientific Technological Institute - INCITEME (1975-1976) and INGEMMET (1980-1985 ). He was a member of Telefónica del Perú Board of Directors from 1998 until his death in 2014.

His net worth of $5 billion, was estimated at $2 billion by Forbes magazine, placing him, along with his family, the fifth among the wealthiest in Peru.
