= Peru and the World Bank =

The World Bank lists Peru as an upper-middle income country. The Peruvian government has been keen to follow the World Bank's policies for growth. As of September 2018 Peru has $485.44 million in outstanding loans with a mix of 19 different institutions and sectors. The policy reform undertaken by the Peruvian government with the assistance of the World Bank, has stimulated one of the fastest growing economies in Latin America.

== Overview ==
Peru averaged a growth rate of 6.1% from 2002 – 2013. In 2018, the Work Bank estimated that the Peruvian economy would have one of the highest growth rates among Latin American countries that year. The World Bank also has raised Peru's 2018 GDP growth projection from 3.5% to 3.9% in its latest report. The growth forecast for the following year is 3.8%. The World Bank's ‘‘Country Partnership Framework’ for Peru establishes three focus points for the nation's investments. Those are 1) Growing services to citizens that live in rural parts of the country 2) raising productivity 3) risk management from climate change, and natural resource management.

To attract outside investment, Peru's government passed an expansive reform agenda, and implemented a new framework for risk allocation by passing new Purchasing power parity laws. These pieces of legislation allow the government to phase out government guarantees and shift financial and construction risk to the private sector. The World Bank currently is providing services to Peru that is partly funded by the Swiss government. Through Switzerland’s $1.5 million technical assistance program, the World Bank is providing technical assistance on preparing standard contracts, and training on the new procedures required for bank approved projects.

== Current projects ==
As of November 29th 2018, the world bank has 193 approved projects in Peru. ‘The Modernizing water supply and sanitation services’ project has a cost of $200 million. The World Bank approved a $70 million IBRD + IDA loan; the remaining $130 million is contributed though local commitments. The three main objectives for the project are 1) improving governance of the water supply, and sanitation service provider efficiency, 2) expanding the water supply and sanitation services to target regions by expanding and rehabilitating existing infrastructure, 3) training locals though project implementation.

Another project called ‘building higher standards for the national statistical system’ was approved on March 20, 2018. It cost $0.4 million and is mostly funded by a grant from “Trust Fund For Statistical Capacity Building” . Objectives of the project are to create a national strategic plan for statistical development of 2018 - 2022. The project aims to raise the standards for timely and complete national accounts, and the production of statistical information related to Peru's dealings with OECD. The project has been active since June 28, 2018.

== Positive results ==
The World Bank claims that in result of the policy reforms, job growth was strong enough to lower the percent of the population living on $5.50 a day from 52.2% in 2005 to 26.1% in 2013. This translates to 6.4 million Peruvians being lifted out of poverty. Also the percent of people living on $3.2 a day (extreme poverty) fell from 33.9% to 11.4% in that same time period.

A bank approved project called the “decentralized rural transport program" maintained 3,277 km of road. This lowed travel time to school by 24.2% on average, this in turn increased enrollment rates of children 12-18 yrs old by 19.2%.

== Criticisms ==
The policies advocated by the World Bank focus on making the nation more appealing to foreign investment. These policy changes have resulted in cuts in workers’ social benefits, tax cuts for private corporations, and fast-tracking procedures at the state land registry. As a result of these policy changes and others, Foreign Direct Investment (FDI) rose from $5.5 billion in 2007 to more than $10 billion in 2013.

The World Bank's 'Doing Business' report, highlighted that businesses in Peru being able to reduce wages on labor and pay less in taxes were key to attracting the FDI.

In 2015 the Peruvian government rewrote the laws on safety and health at work so that businesses were fined ⅓ of the previous amount for health and safety violations. Also the new laws diminishes penal sanction for employers in cases of worker injury or death caused by a violation of safety procedures. The new laws also save companies money by lowering the amount of mandatory medical check ups for labor. The business friendly reforms also earned the criticism from Peru's former Environment Minister Jose de Echave, who called the changes a step backwards to preserving the environment. Also Peru's Ministry of Environment has been instructed to not prioritize preventive and corrective measures for businesses that violate environmental policy, instead to just fine companies who violate environmental law.

From the structural adjustment period in 2013, the government deregulated and privatized the mining sector. This has brought in $5.4 billion in FDI but also resulted in high rates of deforestation, water pollution and the displacement of local communities. The World Bank supports mining in Peru by the Multilateral Investment Guarantee Agency (MIGA) and the International Finance Corporation (IFC) The Yanacocha mine is the second biggest mine in the world and one of the IFC's most profitable investments. Although the mine has created more than 2,000 jobs, and provides great returns to investors, the city that the mine is located, Cajamarca, and it's residence have had little to no quality of life improvements. Cajamarca remains one of Peru's poorest regions.
