= Máxima Acuña =

Peruvian environmentalist

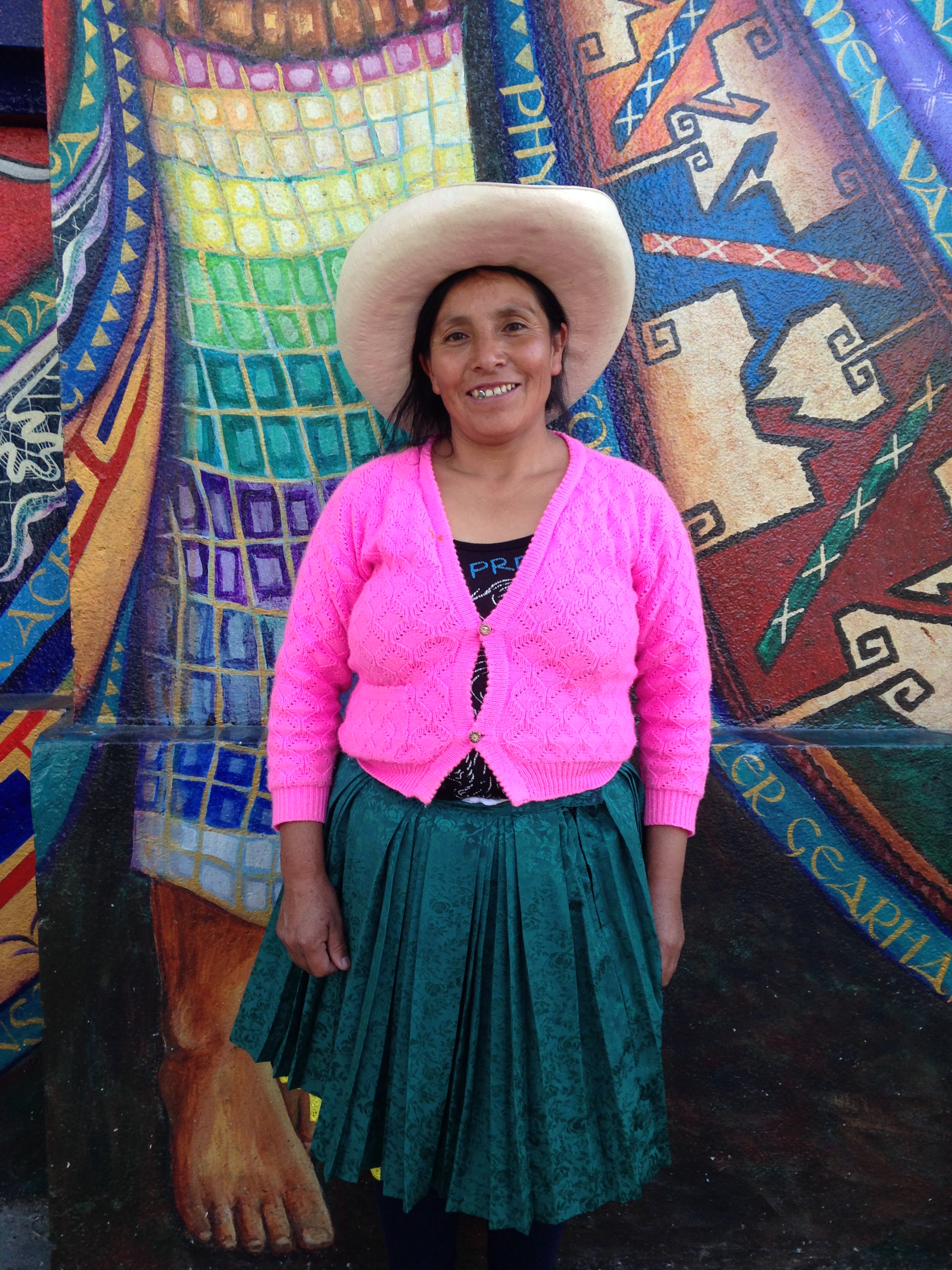
- Born: Máxima Acuña Atalaya; 1970 (age 55–56)
- Citizenship: Peruvian
- Occupations: Farmer, environmentalist
- Years active: 2011–present
- Known for: work to defend highland habitat, water rights and indigenous rights, for which she won the 2016 Goldman Prize
- Spouse: Jaime Chaupe
- Children: 3

Máxima Acuña is a Peruvian subsistence farmer and environmentalist, who is known for her fight to remain on land wanted for a new mine, the Conga Mine, enduring years of violent intimidation by Newmont Mining Corporation and Buenaventura (mining company), for which she received the 2016 Goldman Environmental Prize.

== Life ==
Máxima Acuña is a Peruvian weaver and subsistence farmer living in a remote town in the Northern Highlands of Peru. In 1994, Acuña and her husband bought 27 hectares of land in Tragadero Grande, Sorochuco District, province of Celendin, department of Cajamarca. This is three hours from the main town of Celendin, on the pathway to one of the four lakes which the Yanacocha mine has sought access to, in order to expand into the Conga open pit mine. The Newmont Mining Corporation said in 2015 that it had purchased their property from the local community in 1997.

In 2011, the Acuñas' tiny grass and earth home was destroyed: First in May 2011, when mining engineers from Yanacocha, private security guards and police officers destroyed her earth shack. Police in Sorochuco refused to take her report. The second time in August 2011, when she and her daughter were beaten unconscious, witnessed by her husband. The family reported the incident with forensic photos and video images to the Celendin district attorney, to no avail.

In 2012, protests against the Conga open pit mine became widespread, and in July five protesters were killed. On 21 October Acuña "welcomed the protesters to stay on her land". One week later she was sentenced to pay 200 soles (about US$70) to Yanacocha, to leave her land within 30 days and three years in jail (suspended) for illegal squatting. Her appeals in 2012 and 2014 were unsuccessful, and courts affirmed the initial judgement of squatting.

On 5 May 2014 the Inter-American Commission on Human Rights (IACHR) of the Organization of American States asked the Peruvian government to adopt precautionary measures for 46 leaders of campesino communities and patrols, including the Acuna family.

In December 2014, Newmont's complaint of criminal charges against the Acuñas was dismissed, and in February 2015 security forces destroyed the building foundation on the site of Acuña's planned house. Protests spread to Lima and internationally. Amnesty International mobilized in her defense. The Inter-American Human Rights Commission granted protective measures to the Acuñas, but the State has taken no action.

When asked if the assassination of Berta Caceres affected her she said: "[...] this isn’t a cause of fear for me – it’s not a motive for us to stop fighting, to stop defending."

As of April 2016 Newmont Corporation has continued to claim ownership saying it "exercise[s] the possession of the site by planting in the area recently plowed by the family." On September 18, 2016, Acuña and her partner were viciously assaulted at their home by thugs believed to be in the employ of Newmont.

She is the subject of Maxima, a 2019 documentary film by Claudia Sparrow.

== Personal life ==
Acuña, who stands less than 5 feet tall, has been described as "Badass Grandma Standing Up To Big Mining" by a Brooklyn journalist. A Cajamarca newspaper called her "Dama de las lagunas" akin to the character of Rosendo Maquì from the novel "El mundo es ancho y ajeno" (Broad and Alien is the World) by Ciro Alegría.

== Honors ==
In April 2016, Acuña, then aged 47, received the 2016 Goldman Environmental Prize for her peaceful activism regarding the Conga Mine by the Newmont Mining Corporation.

== See also ==
- Berta Caceres
