= Lionnel Luca =

French politician

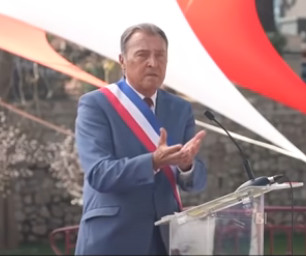

Mayor of Villeneuve-Loubet
- In office 4 April 2014 – In office
- Preceded by: Richard Camou

Member of the National Assembly for Alpes-Maritimes's 6th constituency
- In office 1997–2017
- Preceded by: Suzanne Sauvaigo
- Succeeded by: Laurence Trastour-Isnart

Personal details
- Born: 19 December 1954 (age 71) Boulogne-Billancourt, France
- Party: LR
- Education: University of Nice

Lionnel Luca (born 19 December 1954 in Boulogne-Billancourt) is a French politician who was a member of the National Assembly for Alpes-Maritime's 6th constituency from 1997 to 2007. Since 2014, he is the Mayor of Villeneuve-Loubet.

In the Republicans' 2025 leadership election, Luca endorsed Bruno Retailleau to succeed Éric Ciotti as the party's new chair.
