= Alpes-Maritimes's 6th constituency =

Constituency of the National Assembly of France

6th constituency of Alpes Maritimes
- inline Constituency of the National Assembly of France

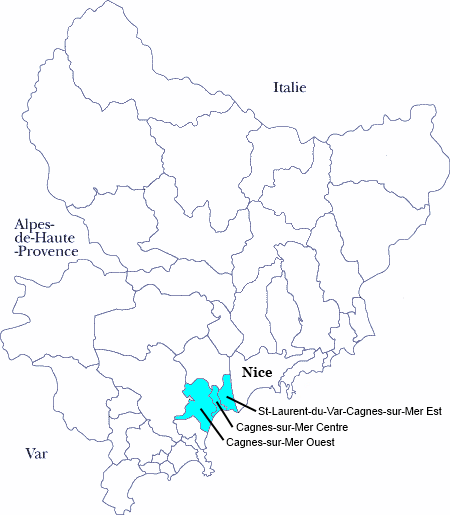
- Constituency (after 2012)in department

- Alpes Maritimes in France
- Deputy: Bryan Masson; RN
- Department: Alpes Maritimes
- Cantons: Cagnes-sur-Mer-Centre, Cagnes-sur-Mer-Ouest, Carros, Coursegoules, Saint-Laurent-du-Var-Cagnes-sur-Mer-Est, Vence

The 6th constituency of Alpes-Maritimes is a French legislative constituency represented in the XIIIth legislature by Laurence Trastour-Isnart of the Republicans. It contains the towns of Cagnes-sur-Mer, Saint-Laurent-du-Var, and their environs.

== Historic Representation ==
Election	Member	Party
1988	Suzanne Sauvaigo	RPR
1993	Suzanne Sauvaigo	RPR
1997	Lionnel Luca	DVD
2002	Lionnel Luca	UMP
2007	Lionnel Luca	UMP
2012	Lionnel Luca	UMP
2017	Laurence Trastour-Isnart	LR
2022	Bryan Masson	RN
2024	Bryan Masson	RN

== Election results ==
=== 2024 ===
Candidate	Party	Alliance	First round		Second round	
Candidate	Party	Alliance	Votes	%	Votes	%
Daniele Bartoli	LO		359	0.66		
Nicole Mazzella	LFI	NFP	8,281	15.20		
Bryan Masson	RN		27,705	50.85		
Laurence Trastour-Isnart	LR	UDC	16,213	29.76		
Pierre Piacentini	DVD		1,927	3.54		
Valid votes			54,485	97.83		
Blank votes			980	1.76		
Null votes			231	1.76		
Turnout			55,696	69.46		
Abstentions			24,490	30.54		
Registered voters			80,186			
Result			RN HOLD			

=== 2022 ===
Legislative Election 2022: Alpes-Maritimes's 6th constituency
Party	Candidate	Votes	%	±%
RN	Bryan Masson	9,349	25.32	+4.68
HOR (Ensemble)	Jean-Bernard Mion	8,849	22.99	-10.05
LR (UDC)	Laurence Trastour-Isnart	7,450	20.18	−7.27
LFI (NUPÉS)	Nicole Mazzella	4,910	13.30	+1.61
REC	Denis Cieslik	3,590	9.72	N/A
DVE	Philippe Robiony	979	2.65	+1.11
Others	N/A	2,152	5.84	−
Turnout		36,919	46.90	−0.71
2nd round result
RN	Bryan Masson	17,564	51.35	N/A
HOR (Ensemble)	Jean-Bernard Mion	16,642	48.65	+6.00
Turnout		34,206	45.30	+4.05
RN gain from LR				

=== 2017 ===
Candidate	Label	First round		Second round	
Candidate	Label	Votes	%	Votes	%
Nathalie Audin	MoDem	12,047	33.04	12,680	42.65
Laurence Trastour-Isnart	LR	10,010	27.45	17,051	57.35
Yoann Saliba	FN	7,526	20.64		
Prune Helfter-Noah	FI	2,416	6.63		
Lionel Dolciani	DLF	920	2.52		
Antoine Marchese	ECO	686	1.88		
Jean-François Téaldi	PCF	590	1.62		
Michel Gaillard	PS	568	1.56		
Jérôme Parise	ECO	561	1.54		
Frédérique Sajan	DIV	464	1.27		
Gilles Marceau	DIV	243	0.67		
Cyril Cousinié	DIV	175	0.48		
Valérie Saché-Grouès	DIV	120	0.33		
Danièle Bartoli	EXG	114	0.31		
Patrick Robbe	DIV	25	0.07		
Votes		36,465	100.00	29,731	100.00
Valid votes		36,465	98.18	29,731	92.40
Blank votes		585	1.58	2,159	6.71
Null votes		91	0.25	287	0.89
Turnout		37,141	47.61	32,177	41.25
Abstentions		40,864	52.39	45,822	58.75
Registered voters		78,005		77,999	
Source: Ministry of the Interior

=== 2012 ===
Legislative Election 2012: Alpes Maritimes 6th
Party	Candidate	Votes	%	±%
UMP	Lionnel Luca	21,841	51.44	
PS	Sylvie Gautier	9,461	22.28	
FN	Hubert de Mesmay	8,536	20.10	
FG	Philippe Gandin	1,461	3.44	
DVE	Oonagh Weldon	787	1.85	
Far left	Jean-Louis Paulus	195	0.46	
Far left	Danièle Bartoli	94	0.22	
Far left	Paul Favale	86	0.20	
Turnout		43,093	56.63	
UMP hold		Swing		

=== 2007 ===
Legislative Election 2007: Alpes Maritimes 6th
Party	Candidate	Votes	%	±%
UMP	Lionnel Luca	40,576	63.14	
PS	Antoine Damiani	9,721	15.13	
MoDem	Loïc Dombreval	4,305	6.70	
FN	Monique Lartigue	3,853	6.00	
PCF	Martine Nativi	1,515	2.36	
LV	Joëlle Faguer	1,294	2.01	
MEI	Jean-Yves Ollivier	1,000	1.56	
Far left	Anne-Marie Dubois	505	0.79	
MNR	Martine Charrac	415	0.65	
LO	Alain Bouilleaux	312	0.49	
Far left	Michelle Paulus	293	0.46	
CPNT	Marie-France Brunier	242	0.38	
Independent	Béatrix Viard	232	0.36	
Turnout		65,126	60.82	
UMP hold		Swing		

=== 2002 ===
Legislative Election 2002: Alpes-Maritimes's 6th constituency
Party	Candidate	Votes	%	±%
UMP	Lionnel Luca	26,478	44.23	
PS	Antoine Damiani	13,232	22.10	
FN	Monique Lartigue	11,659	19.48	
PCF	Anne-Lise Gonella	1,609	2.69	
DVD	Claude Malaussene	1,305	2.18	
Others	N/A	5,578		
Turnout		60,801	63.99	
2nd round result
UMP	Lionnel Luca	35,296	66.77	
PS	Antoine Damiani	17,563	33.23	
Turnout		55,094	57.98	
UMP gain from DVD				

=== 1997 ===
Legislative Election 1997: Alpes-Maritimes's 6th constituency
Party	Candidate	Votes	%	±%
DVD	Lionnel Luca	14,226	25.74	
FN	Jean-Paul Ripoll	11,719	21.20	
RPR	Suzanne Sauvaigo	9,842	17.80	
PS	Odette Boivin	8,841	15.99	
PCF	Marius Papi	5,722	10.35	
Others	N/A	4,928		
Turnout		57,014	67.17	
2nd round result
DVD	Lionnel Luca	35,835	71.38	
FN	Jean-Paul Ripoll	14,365	28.62	
Turnout		57,001	67.16	
DVD gain from RPR				
