= Bureau de Recherches Géologiques et Minières =

French geological survey

Bureau de recherches géologiques et minières

Public company overview
- Formed: October 23, 1959
- Type: Public company
- Jurisdiction: Government of France
- Headquarters: 3, avenue Claude-Guillemin, Orléans, France; 47°49′48.56″N 1°56′14.67″E
- Public company executives: Michèle Rousseau, Chair and managing director; Christophe Poinssot, Deputy Managing Director
- Website: www.brgm.fr

BRGM is France's public reference institution in Earth Science applications for the management of surface and subsurface resources and risks. It also deals with geological surveys of French territory.

BRGM was founded in 1959. It is a public establishment of an industrial and commercial nature (EPIC). It reports to the ministries in charge of research, ecology, and economical matters. It is based in the French prefecture of Orléans. Michèle Rousseau is its chair and managing director and Christophe Poinssot its deputy managing director.

BRGM's scope covers several activities such as scientific research expertise, innovation and transfer, analysis and experimentation, mining risk prevention and safety, higher education, ongoing vocational training, dissemination of knowledge and open science. It employs more than 1,000 people, including over 700 engineers and researchers, at its 27 regional branches in Metropolitan France and French overseas territories. Its teams operate in about thirty countries.

BRGM's scientific strategy is based on six major scientific and societal challenges: geology and knowledge of the subsurface, management of groundwater, risks and spatial planning, mineral resources and the circular economy, energy transition and underground space, data, digital services and infrastructure.

== History and origins ==
=== The creation of BRGM ===
The French Geological Survey [Bureau de recherches géologiques et minières (BRGM)] was officially created by a decree on 23 October 1959. It is the result of the merger of several French geological and mining establishments, namely:

- the Bureau of Geological, Geophysical and Mining Research (BRGGM), itself heir to the Bureau of Geological and Geophysical Research (BRGG) founded in 1941 by Edmond Friedel and Pierre Pruvost, then intended to map the subsurface of France;
- the Mining Bureau of Overseas France (BUMIFOM),
- the Bureau of Mining Research in Algeria (BRMA),
- the French Guiana Mining Bureau (BMG).

=== Milestones in BRGM's history ===
BRGM developed its organisation and activities throughout the 1960s. During this decade, it gradually extended its coverage of the national territory, while its scope extended beyond the borders of France. In 1965, all the teams were grouped together at a single site, at Orléans-La Source. This new technical and scientific centre grouped together most of the institution's resources.

In 1968, BRGM absorbed the French geological mapping service, which had been created a century earlier by Napoleon III. This merger allowed it to cover the entire production chain, from field surveying to publishing.

Just as BRGM finished laying the foundations of its organisation and activities, the 1973 oil crisis occurred. The organisation was able to ensure France's supply of oil, and became the key operator in France's prospection strategy. Its expertise and resources were also used for mining operations. In French regions and abroad, BRGM, with its growing reputation as the subsurface specialist, was henceforth increasingly called upon.

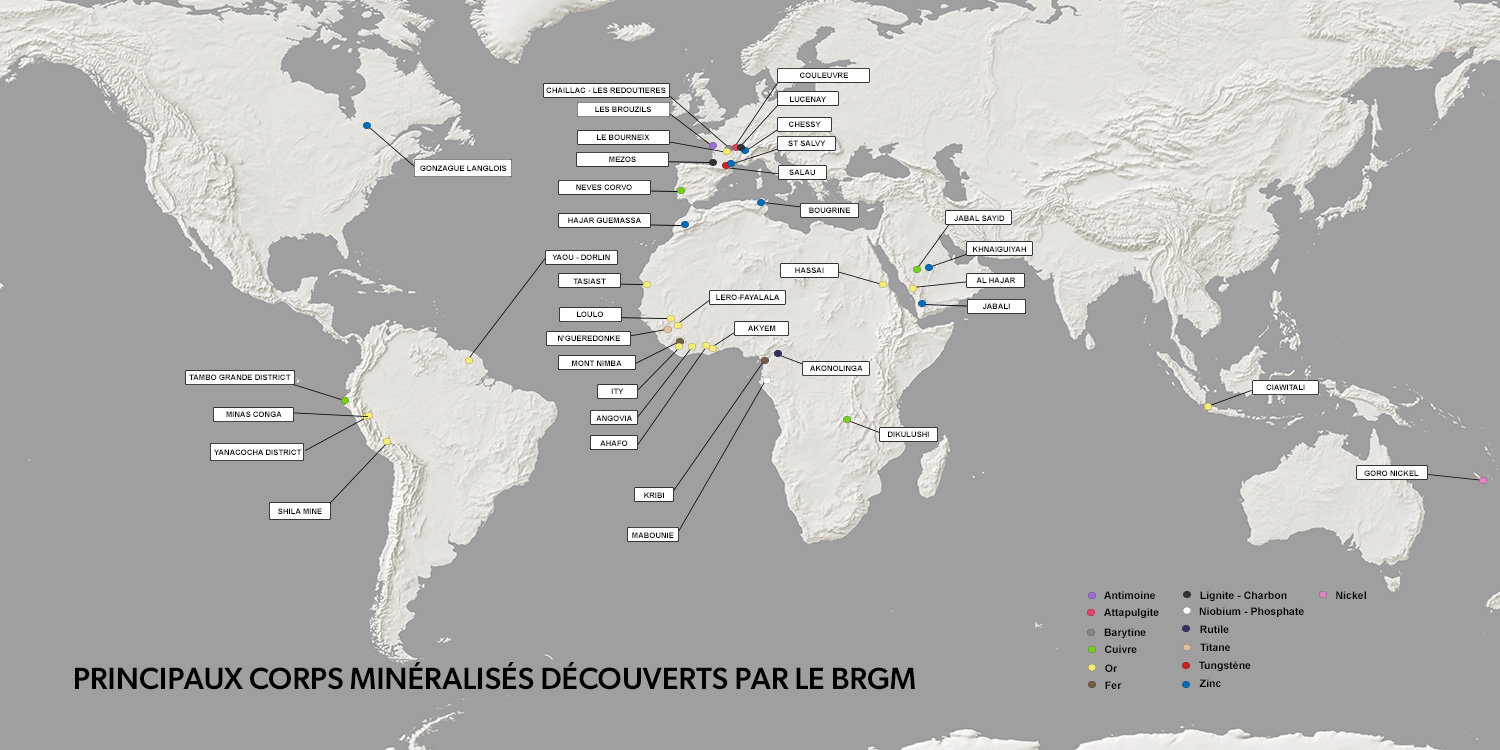

After a golden age paradoxically due to the 1973 oil crisis, BRGM faced a series of difficulties throughout the 1980s. Several mining projects failed. The establishment then strengthened its regional proximity and developed its role in renewable energies while focusing on commercial activities, particularly in the field of spatial planning. In the 1990s, mining and engineering activities were assigned to subsidiaries to enable the establishment to focus on its two missions of public service and scientific research.

In 1999, BRGM set up a new organisation to better tailor its offer to meet societal needs and better respond to new environmental challenges like limited groundwater resources. By withdrawing from its activity as a mining investor and transferring most of its engineering work in France to its subsidiary Antea, which was then sold in 2003, BRGM asserted its research and development role. The new focus on the environment and natural hazards was confirmed by a decree of 20 September 2004 which placed BRGM under the triple supervision of the Ministries of Research, Industry and the Environment.

In 2019, BRGM reaffirmed its general public-service mission, combining research, support for public policies and innovation, in France and abroad. It presented its new 10-year scientific strategy, organised around six major scientific and societal issues.

=== Chairs and management from 1941 to the present day ===
- 1941 : Edmond Friedel, director (BRGG); Jean Goguel, deputy director (1941–1952); Pierre Laffitte, deputy director (1952–1953)
- 1953 to 1959 : Pierre Laffitte, managing director of BRGGM
- 1960 to 1964 : Roland Pré, chair of BRGM; Michel Duhameaux, managing director (1960–1961); Henri Nicolas, managing director (1961–1964)
- 1964 to 1972 : Pierre Signard, chair; Henri Nicolas, managing director (1964–1968); Claude Beaumont, managing director (1968–1972)
- 1972 to 1979 : Yves Perrin, chair; Claude Beaumont, managing director (1972–1975); Paul-Henri Bourrelier, managing director (1975–1979)
- 1979 to 1986 : Jean Audibert, chair; Paul-Henri Bourrelier, managing director (1975–1984); Maurice Allègre, managing director (1984–1986)
- 1986 to 1988 : Gérard Renon, chair; Maurice Allègre, managing director (1986–1988)
- 1988 to 1992 : Maurice Allègre, chair; Claude Mandil, managing director (1988–1990); Jean-Pierre Hugon, managing director (1990–1992)
- 1992 to 1997 : Claude Allègre, chair; Jean-Pierre Hugon, managing director (1992–1997)
- 1997 to 2003 : Bernard Cabaret, chair; Yves Le Bars, managing director (1997–1999); Yves Caristan, managing director (1999–2003)
- 2003 to 2009 : Philippe Vesseron, chair and managing director; Yves Caristan, deputy managing director (2003–2004); Didier Houssin, deputy managing director (2004–2007); François Démarcq, deputy managing director (October 2007 – 2009)
- 2009 to 2013 : Jean-François Rocchi, chair and managing director; François Démarcq, deputy managing director (2009–2013)
- 2013 to 2016 : Vincent Laflèche, chair and managing director (from 3 July); François Démarcq, deputy managing director (2013 – January 2016), then Pierre Toulhoat, deputy managing director (from February 2016)
- 2016–2017(interim) : Pierre Toulhoat, acting managing director, scientific director and director of Strategy and Evaluation
- Since 2017 : Michèle Rousseau, BRGM chair and managing director

== Objectives and activities ==
BRGM's activity covers 4 objectives:

- Understanding geological phenomena and the corresponding risks,
- Developing new methodologies and techniques,
- Producing and disseminating data to support the management of land, the subsurface and their resources,
- Providing the necessary tools to support the management of land, the subsurface and their resources, the prevention of risks and pollution, and helping to shape policies to respond to climate change.

=== Scientific research ===
Scientific research at BRGM aims to further geological knowledge and improve our understanding of surface and subsurface processes. It mobilises more than 700 BRGM engineers and researchers, i.e., two-thirds of the workforce.

BRGM's scientific research mission is carried out through:

- projects funded by government grants for public services,
- projects with multiple co-funding (regional and European),
- partnerships with target agencies (ANR, Ademe, etc.),
- responses to calls for proposals issued by ministries,
- rapid development of research under industrial contracts.

BRGM participates in two thematic alliances whose aim is to coordinate public research stakeholders: AllEnvi (National Environmental Research Alliance) and Ancre (National Alliance for the Coordination of Energy Research). These programme partnerships coordinate the main actors in a field in order to design research and development programmes that are consistent with the national strategy.

=== Expert studies ===
BRGM's expert appraisal activity aims to provide customers with an interpretation, opinion or recommendation in response to a specific question. These assessments are drawn up on the basis of available knowledge and demonstrations accompanied by an objective judgement based on the best applicable practices.

=== Innovation and transfer ===
Generating value from innovation is a major focus of BRGM strategy, along with research and expert knowledge. This involves creating as many opportunities as possible for transfer and economic development. For this purpose, BRGM has acquired the means to generate value from its inventions by ensuring that its concepts mature more quickly and promoting their development and innovation jointly with industrial partners.

=== Analysis and experimentation ===
Within its specific areas of expertise, BRGM designs and develops methodologies for conducting analyses, characterisations, observations and experiments – whether in laboratories or on pilot sites – in gas, water, soil and subsurface environments. BRGM has a wide range of scientific equipment and facilities for performing analyses, characterisations and experiments.

BRGM's laboratories and technological platforms work in particular in the areas of environmental chemistry, metrology, the environment and sensors, isotope geochemistry, mineralogy, and studies in microbiology and molecular biology. BRGM is also involved in multi-scale biogeochemical experimentation and the development of treatment processes.

=== Mine Safety and Prevention ===
Since 2006, France has entrusted BRGM with the technical management of surveillance and safety work of former mining sites and the prevention of mine-related risks. BRGM manages: safety work as delegated project owner, supervision of mining site structures, the post-mining information system, (intermediate mining technical archives and mining information).

BRGM has a "Mining Prevention and Safety" department (DPSM). In addition to its central departments based in Orléans, BRGM's mining safety mission is carried out in the regions by the Post-Mining Territorial Units (UTAMs), which cover the major mining basins.

=== Higher education ===
Under the "BRGM Campus" label, BRGM provides support to higher education in geosciences. To do so, it develops collaborative programmes for different academic organisations. The aim is to cater for the needs of industry and society in all fields involving land and the subsurface.

BRGM Campus covers the entire range of higher qualifications (Bachelor's, Master's, doctorate) as well as BRGM's various fields of expertise in the geosciences.

=== Continuing vocational training ===
BRGM ensures the development of scientific and technical skills by offering short courses and training courses, in-class or through distance learning, catalogue-based or tailor-made, under the BRGM Formation brand name.

=== Dissemination of knowledge and open science ===
BRGM makes its geological and environmental information available through various digital technologies: via its InfoTerre portal it provides free and open access to its geological reports and maps, data in its databases (on the subsurface, industrial sites, natural hazards, etc.) and a large amount of other geoscientific data.

On request from the public authorities, BRGM also coordinates and manages several dozen websites and databases in the fields of geology, natural hazards (Géorisques), water (ADES), mineral resources (Minéralinfo), geothermal energy (Géothermies), etc.

To ensure easy access to its data from anywhere in the country, BRGM also provides three mobile applications: i-InfoTerre (mobile version of the InfoTerre web portal), InfoNappe (on groundwater) and InfoGéol (on the geology of France).

== Scientific and societal issues ==
BRGM's scientific strategy is organised around 6 scientific and societal issues.

=== Geology and knowledge of the subsurface ===
Producing reference information on the subsurface is a key role for BRGM as the French National Geological Survey. The sustainable management of land and resources on local and regional levels requires extensive, reliable and current subsurface knowledge. After the geological map of France programme, BRGM designed the French Geological Repository (RGF), a national programme for the acquisition and management of geological data that involves the entire French geoscience community.

Knowledge of the subsurface lays the foundation for improving the use of resources (e.g., water, energy, minerals and metals), adapting to the impacts of climate change, anticipating and mitigating natural risks and taking these into account in spatial planning. This is relevant to planners, economic stakeholders, environmental managers, education providers, civil society and the general public.

=== Groundwater management ===
Faced with the challenges posed by global changes, one of BRGM's core missions is to further our knowledge of groundwater, by monitoring and anticipating its availability and ensuring its quality.

Groundwater resources are essential for the supply of drinking water and satisfying the needs of agriculture in many countries, and especially in France. Water resources are under increasing pressure from climate change and greater demand for different uses. Demand for groundwater resources may be exceeding supply at the local and regional levels.

=== Risk management and spatial planning ===
For more sustainable spatial planning, BRGM is developing integrated approaches to the management of natural risks that have an impact on land, the subsurface and the coastline, as well as risks resulting from human activity, linked to post-mining, polluted sites and ground.

BRGM conducts research and expertise on natural geological hazards: earthquakes, unstable ground, collapsing cavities, volcanic eruptions, shrinkage and swelling of clays, etc. It is fully involved in the knowledge and management of coastal risks in the context of climate change. Methods and technologies for the decontamination of urban and industrial ground and the rational management of former mining sites also fall within its scope.

=== Mineral resources and the circular economy ===
Confronted with increasing pressures on mineral resources, BRGM is working to ensure a sustainable supply and a more circular economy.

BRGM develops predictive approaches to facilitate the detection and prospecting of primary mineral resources. It observes mineral life cycles and value chains and is thus able to analyse the flows and dynamics involved, integrating environmental, economic and social factors to support the development of a more circular economy and more responsible mining. It also designs innovative solutions for optimising the processing and recycling of mineral materials, using technologies with reduced environmental impacts and lower energy consumption.

=== Subsurface potential for energy transition ===
The energy transition implies a shift towards less centralised and more varied renewable and low-carbon energy sources. Similarly, reducing greenhouse gas emissions will require CO_{2} capture and storage.

BRGM explores, assesses and exploits subsurface potential as an energy resource (geothermal energy) and a space for storage (energy carriers, CO_{2}) and confinement.

=== Digital data, services and infrastructures ===
BRGM collects, hosts and disseminates reliable and long-term geological and environmental data, to which it guarantees access through official and interoperable data repositories.

It also develops applications and innovative tools based on data science and geoscience to model, predict and produce information on the state of the surface and subsurface, their resources and associated risks.

== Geographical locations and scope of action ==
=== Regional network ===
In addition to its head office located in Orléans, BRGM has 13 divisions and 5 regional delegations in mainland France, as well as 5 regional directorates and an Overseas branch, which work closely with its clients and partners throughout the country. BRGM manages its mining safety responsibilities through its 4 regional post-mining units (UTAMs).

BRGM's regional activities include support with policy development as well as expert studies and scientific research.

BRGM's regional divisions work in all BRGM's fields of activity. Water resources, natural risks, climate change impacts and subsurface geothermal potential in France are some of the core themes of BRGM's regional activities.

=== Europe ===
BRGM is actively engaged at EU level through its sustained involvement in European research programmes, and support for public policy development and international cooperation.

Its work for the EU leads BRGM to:

- liaise between governments, government departments, industries, local government and research organisations;
- assist in decision-making by providing data, knowledge, tools and expertise on complex systems at different scales of action;
- be a key networking operator at national, European and international levels, to initiate and build research and development programmes and to develop decision support tools.

=== International ===
Internationally, as it does in France, BRGM contributes its know-how and expertise in two main areas:

- protecting people and their environment against natural risks,
- ensuring the permanent availability and quality of natural water, mineral resources and geothermal energy resources.

Every year, BRGM is active in around thirty countries in the following fields:

- dissemination of geological knowledge through geological maps and information systems;
- mineral resources, with a particular focus on strategic challenges concerning rare metals;
- access to water: protecting water and prospecting for new resources, sustainable water management methods;
- natural risks and their prevention: seismic and coastal risks, spatial planning and reconstruction programmes;
- geothermal energy for heat and power production, as well as geological storage of CO_{2} as a response to climate change.

== BRGM Group and other entities ==
=== Subsidiaries and equity interests ===
The BRGM Group's subsidiaries and equity interests are controlled through three holding companies (Sageos, Coframines and BRGM SA), corresponding to four branches of activity:

- geothermal energy, with CFG Services, a wholly owned subsidiary of BRGM, and Géothermie Bouillante, in which BRGM has a15% share;
- measuring instruments for geophysics, hydrogeology, hydraulics, geotechnics and mining, with IRIS Instruments, 51% owned by BRGM (the Japanese group OYO owns 49%);
- securing traceability in the re-use of excavated earth, with a 40% stake in Soltracing;
- the mining sector, with residual holdings (dormant companies with no activities planned or companies under liquidation) and a minority share in Eramet.

=== Editions du BRGM ===
Our publications branch, Editions du BRGM, offers a selection of geological maps, books and popular geosciences material, which is unique in France.

In keeping with its research and expert study missions, BRGM disseminates scientific and technical knowledge for the scientific community, professionals, regional planners and the general public.

== Miscellaneous ==
=== Dolomieu Prize ===
Created in 1998 by BRGM, in partnership with the French Institute the Academy of Sciences (Paris), the Prix Dolomieu, named after the geologist Déodat Gratet de Dolomieu, is awarded annually to European researchers or engineers in the fields of mathematics, physics, mechanics, computer science and Earth sciences.

=== Case law ===
BRGM has given its name to a major legal ruling handed down on 21 December 1987 by the first Civil Chamber of the French Cour de Cassation (court of appeal): this judgment concerns “the general principle of law according to which the assets of public persons may not be seized", a principle that applies even to EPICs (Public establishments of an industrial and commercial nature) and which prohibits the use of proceedings for enforcement from private law against these establishments.

== Notable foreign equivalents ==
- Germany: Bundesanstalt für Geowissenschaften und Rohstoffe (BGR)
- Canada: Natural Resources Canada
- United States: United States Geological Survey (USGS)
- United Kingdom: British Geological Survey (BGS)
- Finland: Geologian tutkimuskeskus (GTK)
- Czech Republic: Česká geologická služba (CGS)
- Chile: Servicio Nacional de Geología y Minería
