= Jean-Claude Guibal =

French politician (1941–2021)

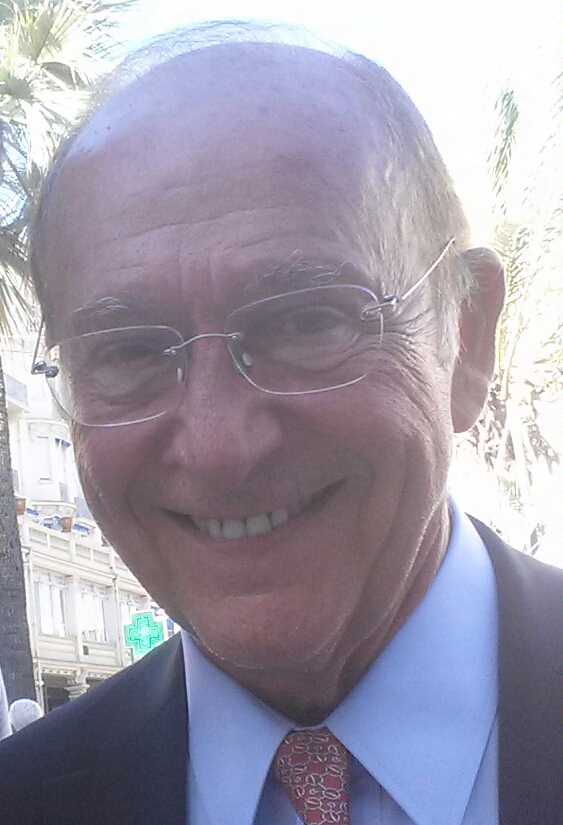

Mayor of Menton
- In office 20 March 1989 – 25 October 2021
- Preceded by: Emmanuel Aubert
- Succeeded by: Yves Juhel

Member of the National Assembly for Alpes-Maritimes's 4th constituency
- In office 1997–2017
- Preceded by: Xavier Beck
- Succeeded by: Alexandra Valetta-Ardisson

Personal details
- Born: 13 January 1941 Ajaccio, France
- Died: 25 October 2021 (aged 80) Menton, France
- Party: Union for French Democracy then The Republicans
- Spouse: Colette Giudicelli (m. 2001; died 2020)
- Education: HEC Paris; Sciences Po; ENA

Jean-Claude Guibal (French pronunciation: [ʒɑ̃ klod ɡibal]; 13 January 1941 – 25 October 2021) was a member of the National Assembly of France. From 1997 to 2017, he represented the 4th constituency of the Alpes-Maritimes department, and was a member of The Republicans since 2015. From 1989 until his death in 2021, he served as mayor of Menton during 6 consecutive terms.

Jean-Claude Guibal is a graduate of HEC Paris, Sciences Po and ENA.
