= Tomati =

Tomati may refer to:

- Giovanni Dominico Tomati (1636-1711), Roman Catholic prelate who served as Titular Bishop of Cyrene
- Marco Antonio Tomati (bishop of Asti) (1593-1683), Roman Catholic prelate who served as Bishop of Asti
- Marco Antonio Tomati (bishop of Bitetto) (1591-1665), a Roman Catholic prelate who served as Bishop of Bitetto

== See also ==
- Tomatis, a surname
- Tomato (disambiguation)
