= Roque Benavides =

Peruvian businessman

- Born: Roque Eduardo Benavides Ganoza; August 20, 1954 (age 71); Lima, Peru
- Education: Pontifical Catholic University of Peru (BS); Henley Management College (MBA); Harvard Business School; Templeton College, Oxford
- Occupations: Businessman, mining magnate
- Years active: 1977–present
- Known for: Leadership of Compañía de Minas Buenaventura
- Political party: Peruvian Aprista Party (2020–present)
- Spouses: Luz María Harten Costa; Thessa Navarro-Grau Dyer
- Children: Alberto Benavides III
- Parent(s): Alberto Benavides de la Quintana; Elsa Ganoza de la Torre
- Relatives: Elsa Blanca Benavides (sister); Alberto Benavides II (brother); Mercedes Benavides (sister); Raúl Benavides (brother); Víctor Raúl Haya de la Torre (grand-uncle)
- Website: www.buenaventura.com/en/ www.forbes.com/companies/buenaventura/#202a57853471

Roque Eduardo Benavides Ganoza (born August 20, 1954) is a Peruvian engineer, businessman, and mining magnate, who is the chairman and former CEO of Compañía de Minas Buenaventura. A leading businessman in the mining sector, Benavides is considered one of the most powerful Peruvian entrepreneurs, and has a net worth of US$2 billion as of March 2013, making him the fifth-wealthiest person in Peru.

Benavides was born in Lima, Peru. He developed an interest in mining business in his youth, eventually entering the Pontifical Catholic University of Peru in order to pursue a degree in mining engineering, but ultimately switched to civil engineering. He went on to graduate from Henley Management College at the University of Reading, and completed advanced business programs at Harvard University and the University of Oxford.

Serving as CFO of Compañía de Minas Buenaventura, his family's company founded by his father, Alberto Benavides de la Quintana, from 1985 to 2001, Benavides took a prominent role in Peruvian business community, propelling to serve as President of the National Confederation of Private Business Institutions (CONFIEP) in two non-consecutive occasions, aside from participating as board member of leading economic groups, among them the Banco de Crédito del Perú. Upon his father's retirement from the company, Benavides succeeded him as CEO in 2001 and as chairman of the board of directors in 2010.

Unlike most Peruvian businesspeople, Benavides is the only leader of a major economic group that has publicly signaled his interest in participating directly in politics. Signaled as a potential presidential candidate for the Peruvian Aprista Party nomination in the 2021 general election, he ultimately declined, but became a full-member of the party, leaving doubt if he would seek the presidential nomination in the next election cycle.

== Early life and education ==
Benavides was born in 1954 in Lima, the fourth of five children of Alberto Benavides de la Quintana, the founder of Compañía de Minas Buenaventura, and Elsa Ganoza de la Torre. His maternal grandfather was Eduardo Ganoza y Ganoza, Second Vice President of Peru between 1945 and 1948. His older sister, Elsa Blanca Benavides Ganoza, is married to businessman José Miguel Morales Dasso. On the maternal side, he is the grand nephew of Víctor Raúl Haya de la Torre, the founder of the American Popular Revolutionary Alliance and the Peruvian Aprista Party.

At first enrolling in mining engineering in order to follow his father's footsteps, Benavides ultimately smithed to civil engineering at the Pontifical Catholic University of Peru, where he obtained his bachelor's degree in engineering. During his time at the Catholic University, Benavides ran for the college's Students Federation under the sponsorship of the Peruvian Aprista Party. Although formally never registered, Benavides maintains a stretch relationship with the party founded by his grand-uncle.

Upon finishing his degree, Benavides travelled to England in order to pursue a Master of Business Administration at Henley Management College, University of Reading, graduating in 1980. Furthermore, he completed the Management Development Program at Harvard Business School and the Advanced Management Program at Templeton College, Oxford, in 1985 and 1987, respectively.

In the academic field, Benavides is a member of the Advisory Council of the School of Administration of the Pontifical Catholic University of Peru, and of the Advisory Council of the University of Engineering and Technology.

== Career ==
Following the completion of his undergraduate studies, Benavides started his professional career in 1977 at the Compañía de Minas Buenaventura, the family company founded by his father, Alberto, in 1953. From 1977 to 1979, he served as project engineer, and as assistant to the chairman of the board from 1980 to 1985. From 1985 to 2001, he served as the company's CFO.

During his twenty-four years working under the management of his father, Benavides was selected as director of the National Society of Mining, Oil and Energy, serving in the position since 1988, holding the society's presidency between 1993 and 1995. From 1999 to 2000, Benavides served as President of the National Confederation of Private Business Institutions (CONFIEP), a private organization that formally convenes the Peruvian business association. He was elected to the position for a second time from 2017 to 2018.

Upon the retirement of his father from the company's management in 2001, Benavides assumed the position of CEO of Buenaventura, and nine years later as chairman of the board. Aside from Buenaventura, Benavides serves as member of the Board of Directors of Sociedad Minera El Brocal S.A.A., the Credit Bank of Peru, and Unión Andina de Cementos S.A.A. – UNACEM.

Under his leadership, Buenaventura achieved revenues of US$1,300 million during 2013, with assets of US$4,560 million, in addition to a 43.65% stake in Empresa Minera Yanacocha, one of the main gold producers in Peru, and a minority percentage at Cerro Verde, the main mine in Arequipa. With all this, they are the main local actors in a sector led by foreign miners such as Barrick, Grupo México (SPCC), the holding company that owns the Antamina mine, and Glencore-Xstrata, among others.
