= Hélène Masson-Maret =

French politician

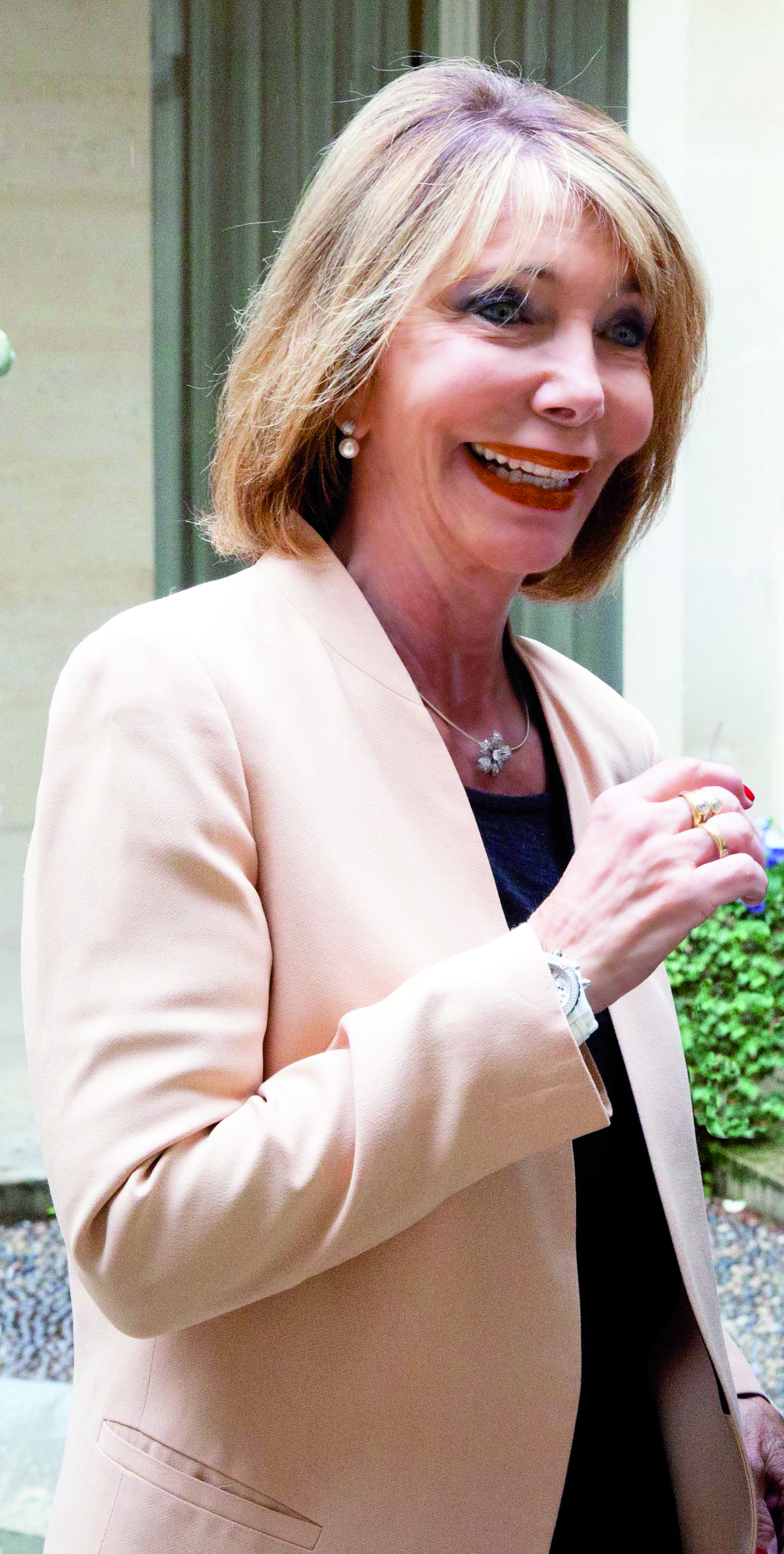
Hélène Masson-Maret

Hélène Masson-Maret (born 7 April 1947) is a member of the Senate of France, representing the Alpes-Maritimes department. She is a member of the Union for a Popular Movement.

== Personal life ==
Masson-Maret is divorced from Olivier Bettati, and their daughter Alexandra Masson is the National Rally Member of Parliament for Alpes-Maritimes's 4th constituency.
