= Tomatis =

Tomatis is a surname. Notable people with the surname include:

- Alfred A. Tomatis, French otolaryngologist and inventor
- Caterina Gattai Tomatis, Italian ballerina
- Lorenzo Tomatis, Italian physician and experimental oncologist
- David Tomatis (born 1962), Monegasque bobsledder
- Gabriel Tomatis (born 1999), French politician

== See also ==
- Tomati, a surname
