= Guidicelli =

Guidicelli is a Corsican surname. Notable people with the surname include:

- Matteo Guidicelli (born 1990), Filipino-Italian actor, model, singer and former kart racer
- Sarah Guidicelli (born 1988), Filipina singer, performer and actress

== See also ==
- Giudicelli
