= Yanacocha =

Peru gold mine

Coordinates: 6.98027°S 78.50487°W

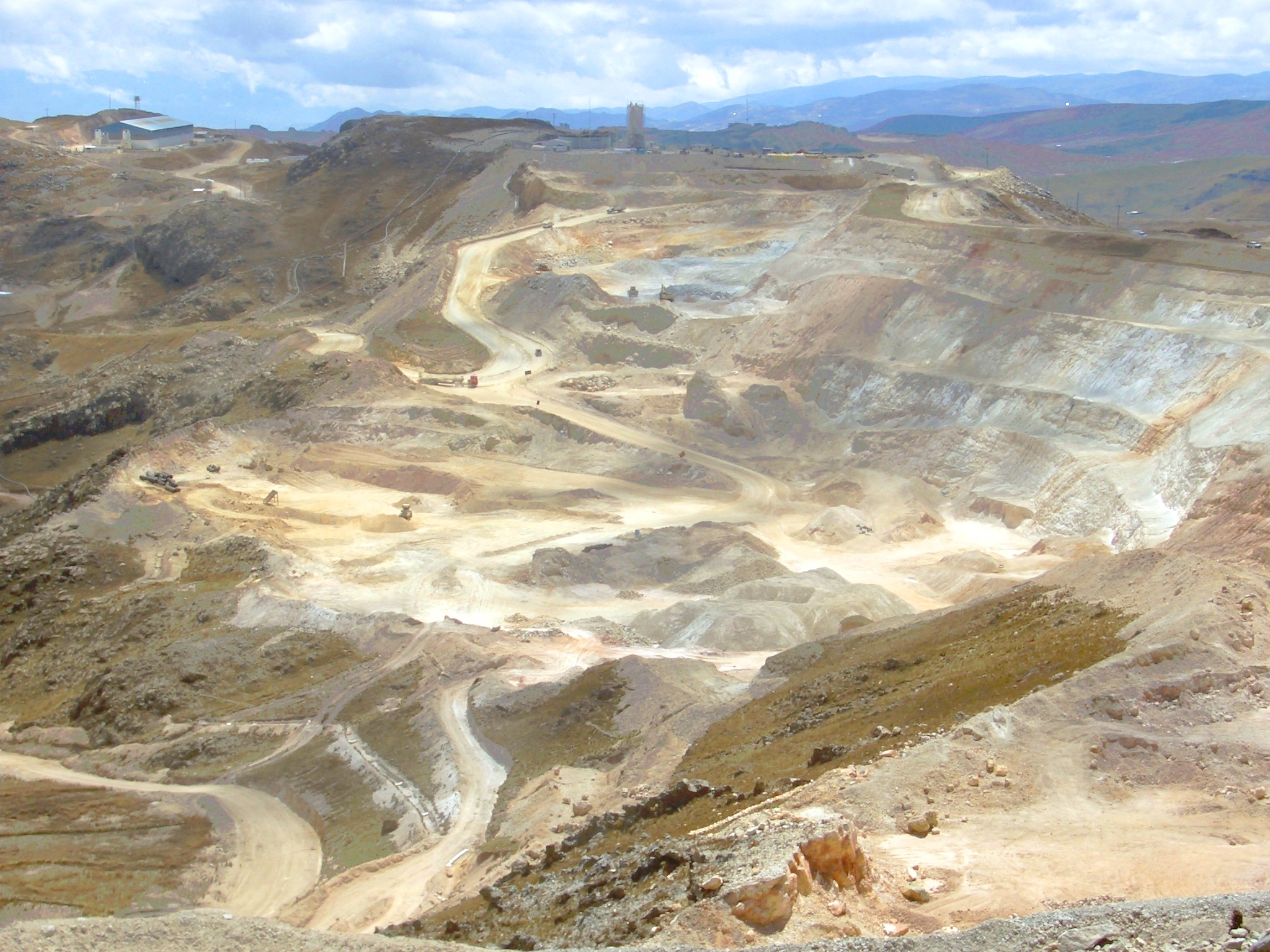
Yanacocha gold mine near Cajamarca, Peru

Yanacocha (Cajamarca Quechua: yana = "black, dark", qucha = "lake, puddle, pond, lagoon") is a gold mine in the Cajamarca region of the Northern Highlands of Peru. Considered to be the fourth largest gold mine in the world, it produced 0.97 million ounces of gold in 2014. The 251-square kilometer open pit mine is situated about 30 kilometers (14 km straight line) north of Cajamarca, in high pampa, straddling the watershed. Formerly a joint venture between Newmont, Compañia de Minas Buenaventura and the International Finance Corporation, as of 2022, it is 100% owned and operated by Newmont.

== Overview, background ==
Yanacocha gold mine is located in the province and department of Cajamarca Region, about 800 kilometers northeast of Lima, Peru in the Northern highlands at 3,500 and 4,100 meters above sea level. It operates in four primary basins and is the largest gold mine in South America. Since 1999 it is a joint venture between Colorado-based Newmont (51%), Buenaventura (44%) and the World Bank Group's International Finance Corporation (5%).

== Geology ==
Exploration from 1985 to 1993 determined Yanacocha was an 18 km by 6 km northeast trending belt of gold bearing high sulfidation outcrop system. Drilling in 1986 confirmed the gold potential. Other deposits discovered during this time include the Carachugo, San Jose, Yanacocha Norte, Maqui Maqui, Yanacocha Sur, Cerro Negro Este, and Cerro Quilish. Production began in 1993. By 2010, 20 hard rock deposits and 2 gravel alluvial fan deposits were being developed. The gold deposits are located in Miocene to Pliocene volcanic andesite host rocks.

Gold and copper mineralization is centered around the Yanacocha diatreme, breccia envelopes, as in Yanacocha Norte and Yanacocha Oeste, or in the pyroclastic ignimbrite sequences, as in Yanacocha Sur. Argillic alteration commenced 11.5 Ma in the southwest part of the district at Cerro Negro Oeste, then proceeded east-northeast to Maqui Maqui in 10.2 Ma, then finally at Yanacocha Norte and Sur in 8.5 Ma. The epithermal systems were contemporaneous with porphyry intrusions.

== Production ==
Production began in 1993.

In 2005, Yanacocha's production peaked with 3,316,933 ounces (103,200 kg) of gold (INEI). Since then, production has steadily decreased:

- 3.3 million ounces (2005)
- 2.6 million ounces (2006)
- 1.6 million ounces (2007)
- 1.8 million ounces (2008)
- 2.1 million ounces (2009)
- 1.5 million ounces (2010)
- 1.3 million ounces (2011)
- 0.97 million ounces (2014)

According to Newmont Mining annual reports from 2005 to 2011, local protests did not hinder production apart from a short production stop in 2006 due to a road blockade.

As of 2015 Yanacocha said the mine provided 2,300 direct jobs.

== History ==
Native Quechua people were aware of gold in the area and called the local river Corimayo, or "gold river." During Ramandi's 1859 expedition to Yanacocha, he noted mines "by the name of Carachugo, and they are in a porous quartz rock, their tunnels are very long..." In 1962 the Guggenheim Bros. ASARCO filed three claims following their discovery of the Michiquillay porphyry copper deposit in 1957. In 1968 Nippon Mining drilled 13 exploration wells. From 1970 to 1971, the British Geological Survey included the Yanacocha District in their reconnaissance survey, which showed the district contained a significant silver anomaly. This led CEDIMIN, a joint venture of BRGM and Compania de Minera Buenaventura, to acquire the mineral concessions in the district. Trenching in 1982 confirmed significant silver. Newmont became the operator of the joint venture in 1985 after a site visit in 1983 and 25 drill holes were made in 1984.

In 1993, the IFC lent $23 million to build Yanacocha, which was then co-owned by US based Newmont, the Peruvian mining company Buenaventura and French government owned company Bureau de Recherches Géologiques et Minières (BRGM). The partnership collapsed in 1994 after BRGM tried to sell part of its shares to an Australian company which was a rival of Newmont. Newmont and Buenaventura would both go to court to challenge the trade.

Larry Kurlander, then a senior executive at Newmont, claimed the French President Jacques Chirac had sent a letter to then Peruvian President Alberto Fujimori asking him to intervene in the court case in favor of BRGM, the French owned company. Newmont sent Kurlander to Peru in order to try to get a favorable outcome for Newmont. The legal battle eventually made it to the Peruvian Supreme Court.

During this period Kurlander acknowledged having met with Vladimiro Montesinos, the Peruvian intelligence chief who has since been found guilty of embezzlement, illegally assuming his post as intelligence chief, abuse of power, influence peddling and bribing TV stations. However, Kurlander claimed that he did nothing illegal and that the French government took similar steps to contact Montesinos. The French ambassador to Peru Antoine Blanca denied this, saying that Montesinos was on the CIA payroll and thus would side with the U.S-based company.

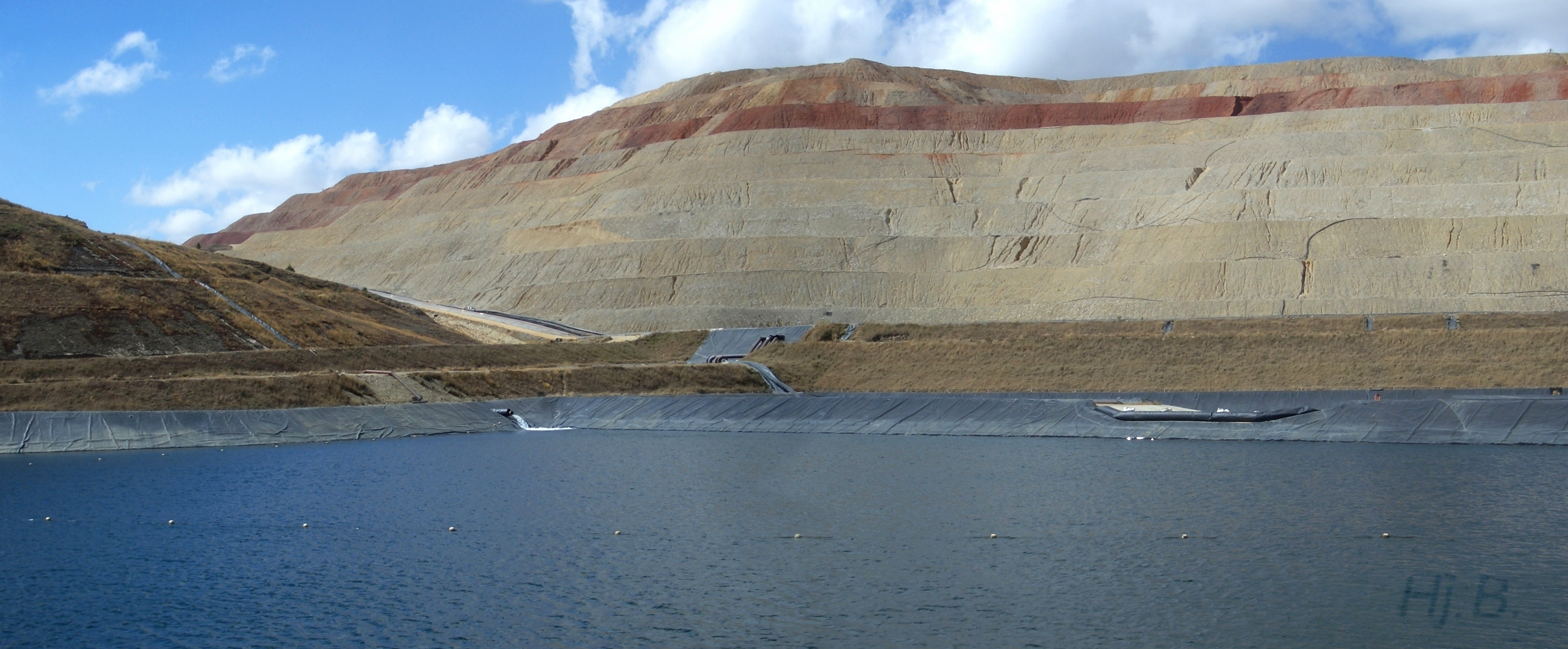
Collecting water containing the extracted gold

After the fall of Fujimori in 2000, a number of videos Montesinos had taped of himself meeting with several domestic and foreign leaders and offering bribes and accepting them had emerged. In October 2005 Frontline in co-production with The New York Times found a February 1998 recording of a telephone conversation between Montesinos and Kurlander. The following is an excerpt from the tape:

Kurlander:...we have a very serious problem in Peru with our company (Newmont) and Minera Buenaventura so I have enlisted the support of some of my friends from a variety of intelligence communities. I need it especially because the other side (the French government) has been acting quite strangely.

Montesinos (to interpreter): Tell him that I am perfectly aware of the problem he has and the people he represents have with the French, as well as the problem he has with the judiciary.

Kurlander: So now you have a friend for life. I want a friend for life.

Montesinos (to interpreter): I thank you very much for what you have just told me and well you already have a friend. Tell him I'm going to help him with the voting. I would like to know the tricky practices of the French. The French Connection!

Kurlander: The French Connection!

(laughter)

Along with this telephone conversation, Frontline and The New York Times re-broadcast three other videos. One was filmed in April 1998 and shows Montesinos talking to "Don Arabian", the CIA station chief in Peru, in an attempt to get CIA to pressure the U.S. to back Newmont in the case. In the video Montesinos claimed to have found e-mails from Paris to Peru of French officials trying to influence the court to get a decision favorable to France.

Another video recorded in May 1998 showed Montesinos meeting with Peruvian Supreme Court Justice and former classmate, Jaime Beltran Quiroga, in which Montesinos said that in the case between Newmont and BRGM state interests are at stake. He told Quiroga that if the decision went to Newmont, the United States would back Peru in its border dispute with Ecuador which had exploded into the Cenepa War a few years prior. He also told Quiroga to deny any connection with him to the press. Quiroga later played a crucial role, as his vote was deciding in the Newmont victory. After the video was first broadcast on a Peruvian local television station in 2001, the French Ambassador Antoine Blanca was quoted as saying "Now I know why Newmont won".

In July 1999, Montesinos was seen with the then departing CIA station chief "Don Arabian" on the third video, giving him a gift and thanking him for the help he gave Peru stating "[W]e hope that when you're back there [in Washington] you'll remember your friends".

The IFC financed Yanacocha's expansion in 1999 for which it received the 5% ownership stake.

== Environmental conflict ==
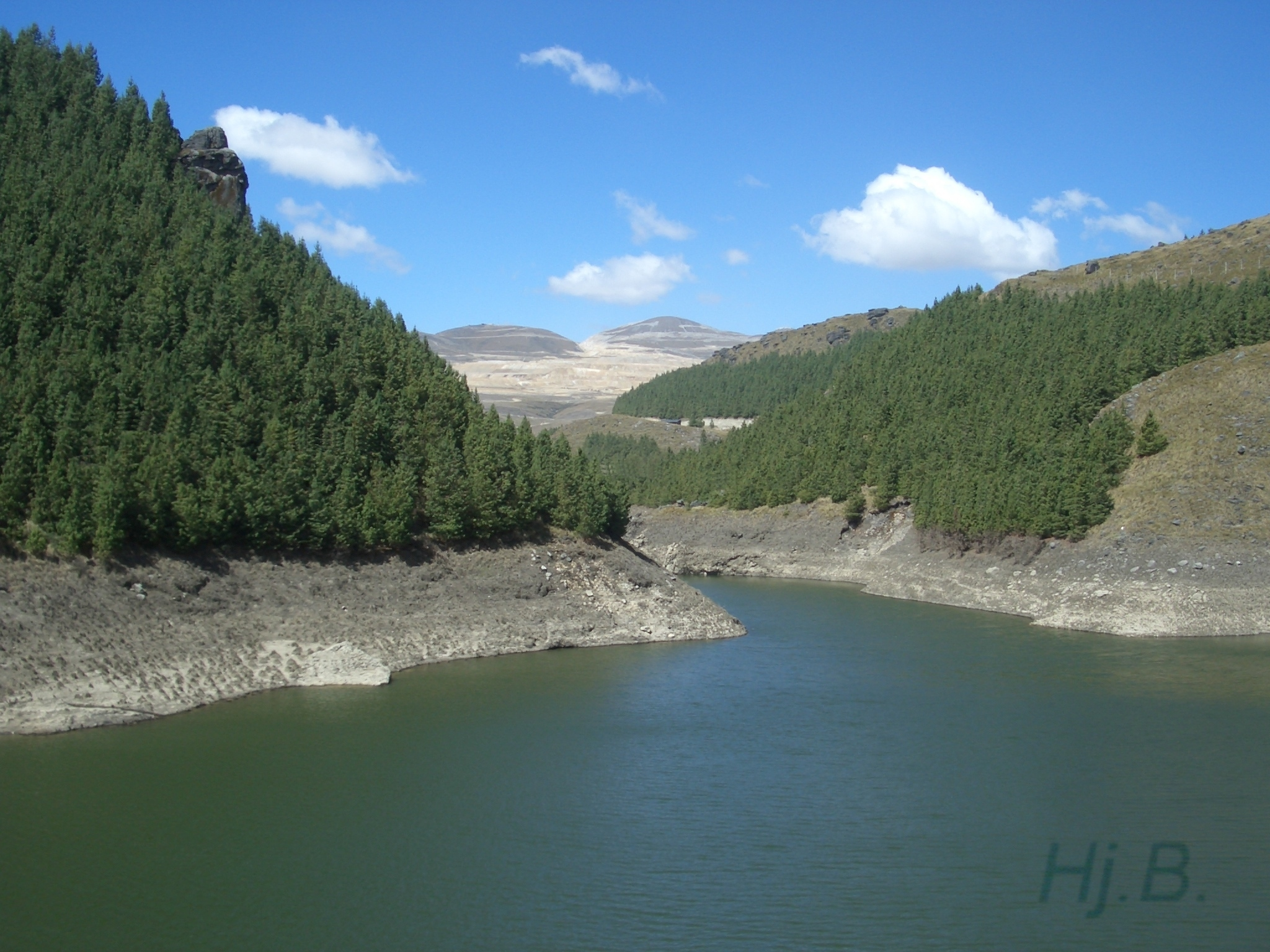
Renaturalized area (Aug. 2005)

Newmont has been involved in an ongoing conflict over damages resulting from a mercury contamination. On June 2, 2000, 151 kilograms of mercury were spilled when transported by a contracted truck from Yanococha to the Pacific coast, contaminating the town of Choropampa and two neighboring villages. According to government estimates, more than nine hundred people were poisoned. Beyond the poisonings, famers in town lost most of their market due to people being afraid of contaminated food and many people overall moved away, leaving Choropampa much emptier.

Local environmental activists have claimed that mining operations, which use large quantities of a dilute cyanide solution, have contaminated the water sources, leading to the disappearance of fish and frogs, illnesses among cattle, air pollution, and loss of medicinal plants. An environmental audit by the Colombian consultancy firm Ingetec S.A. (Ingenieros Consultores: Auditoría Ambiental y Evaluaciones Ambientales de las Operaciones de la Minera Yanacocha en Cajamarca - Perú 2003) found some water contamination above permitted levels, and recommended improvements to Yanacocha's environmental management practices. However, the study did not examine claims of impacts on wildlife, plants or livestock. Based on an Ingetec review in April 2006, Yanacocha acted on the 309 Ingetec recommendations, fully implementing 137, making progress on 111, and starting to address 45 of the recommendations - representing progress on 90% of the recommendations in advance of the agreed 2007 completion date. In addition to water contamination, the mines also affected water quantity in the surrounding area. Due to the process of dewatering taking place across at least six million tons of wetlands, water is not only removed from natural underground caches, but prevented from entering back in through rainfall. This results in less flow in streams and more runoff from mining operations, polluting the water underground with sediments, metals, and acid. This redirection has also resulted in flooding in the Upper Cunas according to locals, ruining highland and alpaca pastures. The mining operations themselves would also result in water loss, such as the Conga expansion of the Yanacocha mine requiring the drainage of four alpine lakes. To mitigate these concerns the mining company has gone on record to say they would return all of the removed water after putting it through a water processing plant.

Beyond the environment itself, there have been a decent amount of urban changes as a result of the mine as well. Many of the green spaces within Cajamarca have been developed, substituted for more buildings and paved roadways. This has affected the livelihoods of some women in Cajamarca as growing livestock and agricultural projects required these more open areas of nature to take place.

In 2004, more than 10.000 people living in the Cajamarca area protested the expansion of Yanacocha onto nearby Cerro Quilish, a mountain that supplies water to Cajamarca. In response to public outcry, Newmont announced that further exploration would be suspended.

At the end of 2004 after losing a three-year fight to keep the lawsuit out of US courts, Newmont announced that it would participate in settlement talks before two retired Colorado judges. But the mediation talks failed to produce a settlement and eleven hundred campesinos, announced they would go ahead with their suit in Denver district court. In 2008, the Peruvian Supreme Court upheld the validity of settlement agreements reached with some of the plaintiffs in the remaining Peruvian lawsuits prior to the filing of those suits. As of April 2009 the parties in the Denver cases agreed to binding arbitration and settled. By the beginning of 2010, Newmont reported that claims of approximately 200 plaintiffs remained unsettled.

The mercury spill had also led to two separate complaints to the Compliance Advisor/Ombudsman (CAO) of the International Finance Corporation (IFC)/Multilateral Investment Guarantee Agency (MIGA). Starting in 2001 the CAO held a series of meetings with local stakeholders who raised concerns regarding the impacts of the mine, and made suggestions for transparent dialogue between the community and Yanacocha. A Mesa (roundtable for dialogue) was formed. The CAO sponsored the 2003 water study, and the water monitoring program until 2006. In February 2006 the CAO concluded its involvement and published an "Exit Report" which included a table summarizing progress made against the original concerns raised by the community in 2001.

At the beginning of August 2006, protests broke out against the expansion of the company's Carachugo pit, building a dam (El Azufre) near the village of Combayo. Residents of Combayo blocked the roads leading to the dam, protesting against possible contamination of water supplies and expressed their disappointment in sharing in social and economical benefits of the mining project. The protests ended in clashes between Police and private Yanacocha security guards (FORZA) on the one hand and local farmers on the other. Several people were wounded and Isidro Llanos Canvar, a local farmer, was shot dead. At the end of August 2006, Carachugo II was closed for three days as local farmers blocked the entrance roads to the pit demanding clarification of the death of Isidro.

On 2 November 2006, Edmundo Becerra Corina, an environmentalist and opponent of Yanacocha's gold mining project, was shot dead in Yanacanchilla, Cajamarca province. He had received several death threats because of his opposition to the expansion of the mining company's activities in the region. The attack took place days before he was due to meet with representatives from the Ministry of Energy and Mines.

The Peruvian NGO GRUFIDES, an environmental organization with a strong anti-mining stance, investigated the killings and provided support for the families of protesters that were injured and killed in the August demonstrations. In November 2006 two members of Grufides, Father Marco Arana and Mirtha Vasquez reported receiving several death threats and were followed and filmed both at work and at home. An investigation by the Peruvian press uncovered that individuals with ties to the security firm FORZA, which Newmont hired to provide security at Yanacocha, were involved in the surveillance of the GRUFIDES staff members. Newmont denied any involvement in the harassment or surveillance. In response to the threats Amnesty International issued an urgent action stating that "their lives, and those of others associated with GRUFIDES, may be in danger".

On 15 June 2007, several local farmers, including two minors, were injured and taken into custody by public and private police forces paid by Yanacocha in the village of Totoracocha. The farmers occupied heavy machinery of the mining company as they were protesting against wage withholding for construction work they had been carried out for Yanacocha.

After a court ruling was left untouched for twelve years, on August 20, 2024 the High Court in Cajamarca officially ruled that the Conga expansion was too hazardous to be built. This case began in 2012 due to the actions of Father Marco Arana and Mirtha Vásquez, who took the initial legal action against the project. This ruling came as a result of the Conga Project being unable to state all of the potential environmental risks of its operations. This judgment was made in spite of Yanacocha being the first mine to receive a certification for environmental management systems from the International Organization for Standardization in 2008.

== Controversies ==
One of the largest controversies Newmont has had was the harassment of farmer Máxima Acuña for her land. From 2011 to 2017 the company used threats over phone call, destruction of property, home invasions, utilization of state police, and legal action to make Màxima give up her land. On May 3, 2017 the attempted legal action against Màxima's family was officially denied by the Supreme Court of Peru, allowing her to remain on her land.

On July 3 and 4, 2012 during protests against the Conga expansion of the Yancocha mine, the Peruvian police force came to intercede. As a result five protesters died and forty-five were heavily wounded. Following this event a state of emergency lasting for about two months began, which involved more police violence being done.

== See also ==
- Cerro de Pasco
- Toquepala mine
