= Alexandra Valetta-Ardisson =

French politician

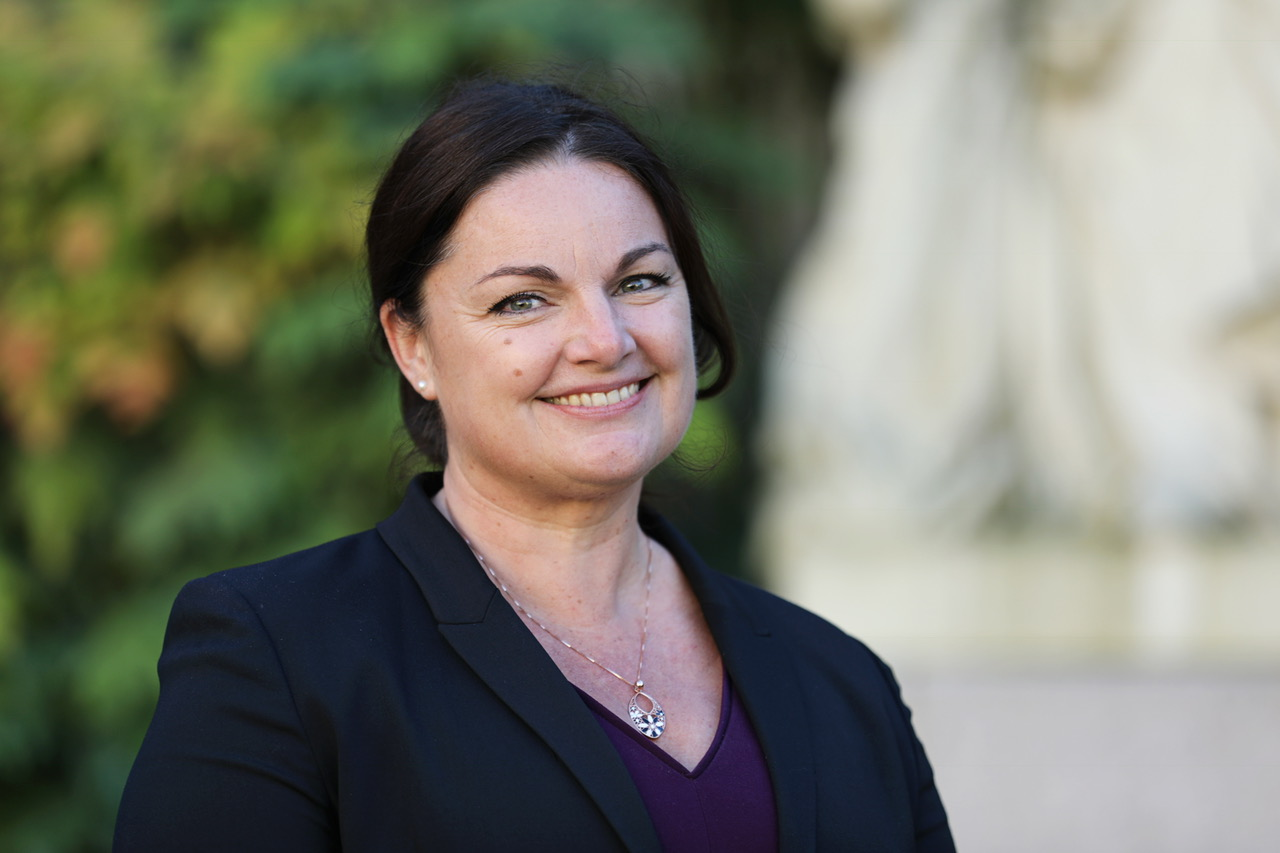

Member of the French National Assembly for Alpes-Maritimes's 4th constituency
- In office 21 June 2017 – 21 June 2022
- Preceded by: Jean-Claude Guibal
- Succeeded by: Alexandra Masson

Member of the Municipal council of Grasse
- In office 2014–2017

Personal details
- Born: 7 June 1976 (age 49) Cannes, France
- Party: The Republicans (until 2016); En Marche! (since 2016)
- Profession: Civil servant of local governments

Alexandra Valetta-Ardisson (born 7 June 1976) is a French politician of La République En Marche! (LREM) who served as a member of the French National Assembly from 2017 to 2022, representing the department of Alpes-Maritimes.

== Political career ==
In parliament, Valetta-Ardisson served as member of the Committee on National Defense and the Armed Forces. In addition to her committee assignments, she is part of the parliamentary friendship groups with Italy, Monaco and the United Arab Emirates.

In July 2019, Valetta-Ardisson voted in favour of the French ratification of the European Union’s Comprehensive Economic and Trade Agreement (CETA) with Canada.

She lost her seat in the second round of the 2022 French legislative election to Alexandra Masson from the National Rally.

== See also ==
- 2017 French legislative election
