= Maxima (film) =

- Directed by: Claudia Sparrow
- Produced by: Ryan Schwartz; Claudia Sparrow
- Starring: Máxima Acuña
- Cinematography: Magela Crosignani; Philip Knowlton; Leandro Marini
- Edited by: Alejandro Valdes-Rochin
- Music by: Mauricio Yazigi
- Production company: TrustFall Films
- Distributed by: Indie Rights
- Release date: April 27, 2019 (Hot Docs)
- Running time: 88 minutes
- Country: United States
- Language: Spanish

Maxima is an American documentary film, directed by Claudia Sparrow and released in 2019. The film is a profile of Máxima Acuña, a Peruvian farmer and environmentalist who has struggled against corporate mining interests for the right to remain on her land.

The film premiered at the 2019 Hot Docs Canadian International Documentary Festival, where it was the winner of the Hot Docs Audience Award. It was later screened at the 23rd Lima Film Festival, where it won the Audience Award for the Made in Peru program.
