= Tomato (disambiguation) =

The tomato is a brightly colored (usually red) berry.

Tomato may also refer to:

== Entertainment ==
- "Tomato" (song), a 1949 calypso often known as "Don't Touch Me Tomato"
- Tomato (album), by the South Korean girl group Chakra
- Tomato (musician) (born 1969), American singer, drummer and songwriter for the alternative rock band Sound of Urchin
- Tomato the Cutesy Gumshoe, a one-shot manga by Akira Toriyama
- "Tomato", a song by Gen Hoshino from the single "Fushigi" / "Create"
- "Tomatoes", an episode of the television series New Girl
- Princess Tomato, the title character in the 1984 video game Princess Tomato in the Salad Kingdom

== Businesses ==
- Tomato Bank, a private overseas Chinese bank in the US
- Tomato (design collective), a UK company doing multimedia and graphical design, founded in 1991
- Tomato (mobile phone operator), a Croatian mobile virtual network operator

== Other uses ==
- Tomato (firmware), free firmware for Broadcom-based wireless routers
- Tomato, Arkansas, an unincorporated community
- Clyde Mandelin, a translator also known as Tomato

== See also ==
- Tormato, a 1978 album by English progressive rock band Yes
- Tomati
- Tomatis
