= Marc Daunis =

French politician

René Vestri

Senator, French Senate
- Incumbent
- Assumed office 21 September 2008
- Constituency: Alpes-Maritimes

Mayor, Valbonne

Personal details
- Born: April 22, 1955 (age 70) Saint-Jean-Cap-Ferrat, France
- Party: Socialist

Marc Daunis (born 22 April 1955) is a member of the Senate of France. He represents the Alpes-Maritimes department, in Provence-Alpes-Côte d'Azur and is a member of the Socialist Party.

== Bibliography ==
- Page on the Senate website
