= Pierre Laffitte (politician) =

French politician (1925–2021)

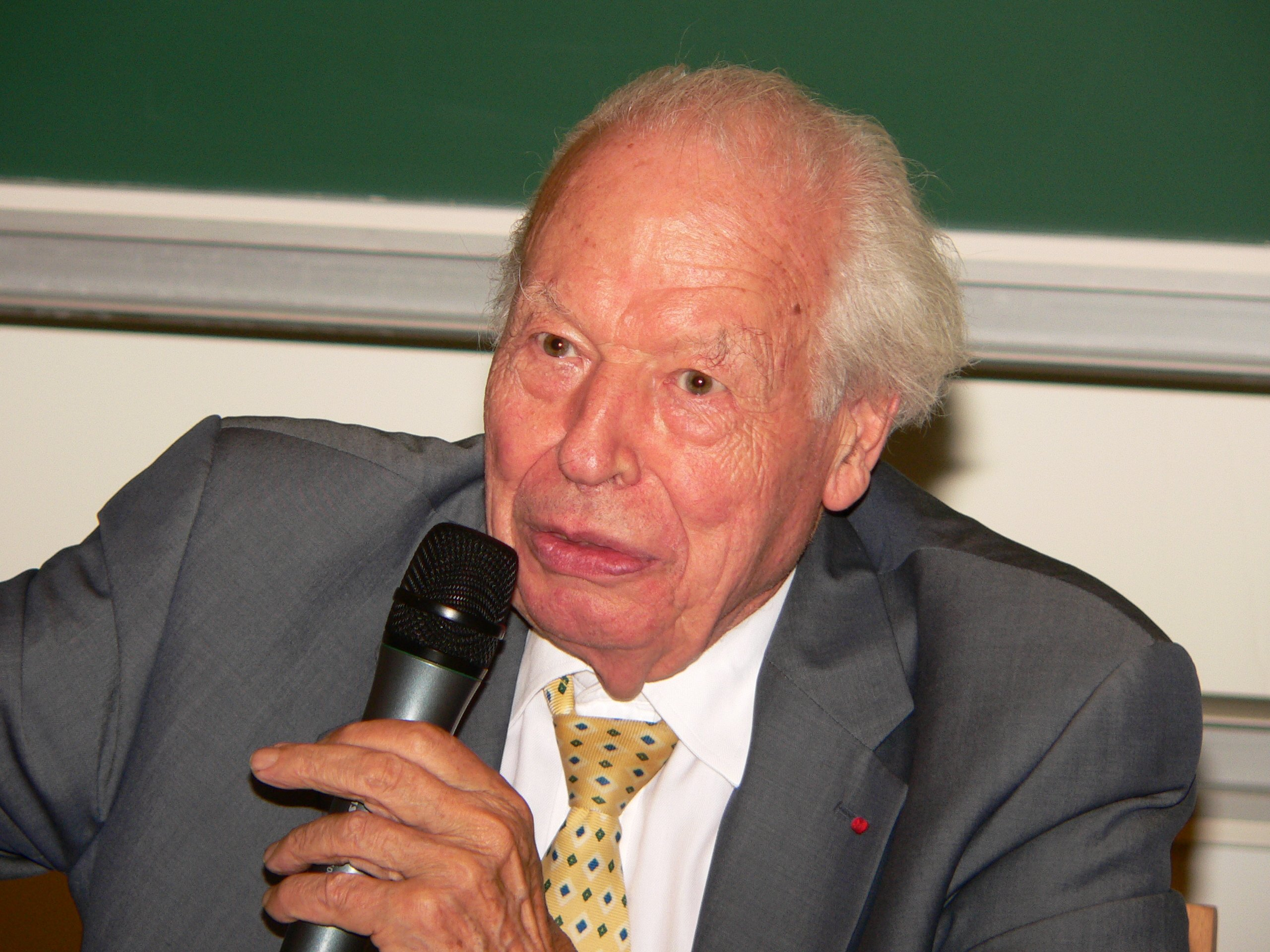
- Laffitte in 2006

Member of the Senate of France
- In office 14 May 1985 – 30 September 2008
- Constituency: Alpes-Maritimes

President of the European Democratic and Social Rally group in the Senate of France
- In office 19 September 2007 – 30 September 2008
- Preceded by: Jacques Pelletier
- Succeeded by: Yvon Collin

Personal details
- Born: 1 January 1925 Saint-Paul-de-Vence, France
- Died: 7 July 2021 (aged 96)
- Party: PR

Pierre Laffitte (1 January 1925 – 7 July 2021) was a French politician and scientist. He was the founder of Sophia Antipolis and represented Alpes-Maritimes in the Senate of France from 1985 to 2008 as a member of the Radical Party (PR).

== Biography ==
Pierre was the son of Jean Laffitte, a painter born in Algiers, and Lucie Fink, born in Strasbourg under the German Empire. In 2007, Fink was recognized as Righteous Among the Nations. In 1949, Pierre married Sofia Grigorievna Glikman-Toumarkine, who died in 1979. He then married Anita Garcia in 1985, who died in 2005, and lastly married Isabelle Michel.

Laffitte graduated from the École Polytechnique and began his career with the Ministry of Industry. He left the Ministry in 1963 and became deputy director of teaching at the Corps des Mines of Mines Paris. With the school, he led classes préparatoire aux grandes écoles and laid the foundation for the Label Carnot.

Laffitte joined the Radical Party early in his life and entered politics in 1961 as a Municipal Councilor in his hometown of Saint-Paul-de-Vence. He became the deputy for Senator Francis Palmero in 1971. When Palmero died in May 1985, Laffitte filled his seat. He was re-elected in 1989 and 1998. From 2007 to 2008, he was President of the European Democratic and Social Rally group. In 2008, the election in Alpes-Maritimes was changed to an election by list, and Laffitte ran within the Miscellaneous right, allocation 9.2% of votes, finishing fourth and failing to maintain his Senate seat.

Pierre Laffitte died on 7 July 2021 at the age of 96.

== Distinctions ==
- Officer of the Legion of Honour
- Officer of the Ordre national du Mérite
- Commander of the Order of the Polar Star
- Commander of the Order of Merit of the Federal Republic of Germany
- Member of the KTH Royal Institute of Technology
- President of the Haut Conseil culturel franco-allemand (1988–2001)
- Adenauer-de Gaulle Prize (1994)
- Prix du promoteur de la société de l'information (2004)
- Doctor honoris causa of the Colorado School of Mines
- Doctor honoris causa of the Open University

== Works ==
- Introduction à l'étude des roches métamorphiques et des gîtes métallifères
- Métallogénie de la France
- Carte minière du globe sur fond tectonique au 1/20 0000e
- Traité d'informatique géologique
- Les Technopoles en France
- Sophia Antipolis. Naissance d'une Ville ?
- L'Accès au savoir par la télévision
