= Colette Giudicelli =

French politician (1943–2020)

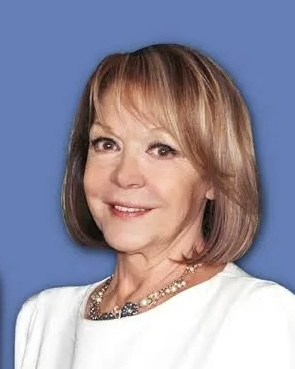
- Giudicelli in 2020

Member of the French Senate for Alpes-Maritimes
- In office 1 October 2008 – 24 September 2020

Departmental councillor of Alpes-Maritimes
- In office 29 March 2015 – 24 September 2020
- President: Charles-Ange Ginésy
- Constituency: Canton of Menton

Personal details
- Born: 24 November 1943 Algiers, French Algeria
- Died: 24 September 2020 (aged 76) Menton, France
- Party: UMP; The Republicans
- Spouse: Jean-Claude Guibal

Colette Giudicelli (24 November 1943 – 24 September 2020) was a French politician and a member of the French Senate. She represented the Alpes-Maritimes department and was a member of the Union for a Popular Movement party and later of The Republicans.

She began her political career as city councillor of Menton in 1989. Giudicelli was married to Jean-Claude Guibal, mayor of Menton.

Colette Giudicelli died on 24 September 2020 at the age of 76.
