= Alpes-Maritimes's 4th constituency =

Constituency of the National Assembly of France

4th constituency of Alpes Maritimes
- inline Constituency of the National Assembly of France

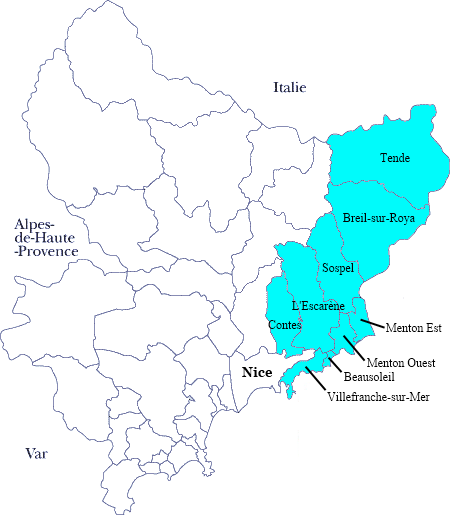
- Constituency (post 2010 redistricting) in department

- Alpes Maritimes in France
- Deputy: Alexandra Masson; RN
- Department: Alpes Maritimes
- Cantons: Beausoleil, Breil-sur-Roya, L'Escarène, Menton-Est, Menton-Ouest, Sospel, Tende, Villefranche-sur-Mer

The 4th constituency of the Alpes Maritimes is a French legislative constituency in the Alpes Maritimes département. Like the other 576 French constituencies, it elects one MP using the two-round system, with a run-off if no candidate receives over 50% of the vote in the first round.

== Geography ==
It covers a large area in the east of the department, from Nice to the Italian border at Menton.

== Historic Representation ==
| Election | Member | Party |
|---|---|---|
| 1988 | Emmanuel Aubert | RPR |
| 1993 | Emmanuel Aubert | RPR |
| 1995 | Xavier Beck | RPR |
| 1997 | Jean-Claude Guibal | RPR |
| 2002 | Jean-Claude Guibal | UMP |
| 2007 | Jean-Claude Guibal | UMP |
| 2012 | Jean-Claude Guibal | UMP |
| 2017 | Alexandra Valetta-Ardisson | LREM |
| 2022 | Alexandra Masson | RN |
| 2024 | Alexandra Masson | RN |

== Election results ==
=== 2024 ===
| Candidate | Party | Alliance | First round | | Second round | |
| Candidate | Party | Alliance | Votes | % | Votes | % |
|---|---|---|---|---|---|---|
| Alexandra Masson | RN | | 30,528 | 56.27 | | |
| Anne-Pascale Guedon | REN | Ensemble | 12,116 | 22.33 | | |
| Virginie Parent | PCF | NFP | 8,935 | 16.47 | | |
| Christine Beyl | Political ecology in France | | 2,216 | 4.08 | | |
| Joseph Markiel | LO | | 454 | 0.84 | | |
| Valid votes | | | 54,249 | 97.10 | | |
| Blank votes | | | 985 | 1.76 | | |
| Null votes | | | 637 | 1.14 | | |
| Turnout | | | 55,871 | 65.22 | | |
| Abstentions | | | 29,789 | 33.78 | | |
| Registered voters | | | 85,660 | | | |
| Result | | | RN HOLD | | | |

=== 2022 ===
| Candidate | Label | First round | | Second round | |
| Candidate | Label | Votes | % | Votes | % |
|---|---|---|---|---|---|
| Alexandra Masson | RN | 10,925 | 28.87 | 19,487 | 56.2 |
| Alexandra Valetta-Ardisson | ENS | 8,464 | 22.37 | 15,185 | 43.8 |
| Sophie Bournot-Poulet | NUPES | 5,803 | 15.33 | | |
| Roger Roux | LR | 5,494 | 14.52 | | |
| Damien Rieu | REC | 4,036 | 10.66 | | |
| Pascal Ducreux | ECO | 1,117 | 2.95 | | |
| Fabrice Carbonel | DSV | 680 | 1.8 | | |
| David Bieder | ECO | 534 | 1.41 | | |
| Christine Beyl | ECO | 530 | 1.4 | | |
| Joseph Markiel | DXG | 261 | 0.69 | | |
| Votes | | 37,844 | | 34,672 | |
| Valid Votes | | 37,844 | 98.06 | 34,672 | 93.36 |
| Blank votes | | 528 | 1.37 | 1,744 | 4.7 |
| Null votes | | 220 | 0.57 | 721 | 19.4 |
| Turnout | | 38,592 | 45.25 | 37,137 | 43.54 |
| Abstentions | | 46,689 | 54.75 | 48,154 | 56.46 |
| Registered voters | | 85,281 | | 85,291 | |
Source: Ministry of the Interior

=== 2017 ===
| Candidate | Label | First round | | Second round | |
| Candidate | Label | Votes | % | Votes | % |
|---|---|---|---|---|---|
| Alexandra Valetta-Ardisson | REM | 11,045 | 28.23 | 17,047 | 52.74 |
| Olivier Bettati | FN | 9,139 | 23.36 | 15,274 | 47.26 |
| Xavier Beck | LR | 8,075 | 20.64 | | |
| Zohra Briand | FI | 2,637 | 6.74 | | |
| Michaël Albin | PCF | 2,310 | 5.90 | | |
| Anthony Malvault | DIV | 1,991 | 5.09 | | |
| Laurent Lanquar-Castiel | ECO | 933 | 2.38 | | |
| Nicolas Zahar | EXD | 703 | 1.80 | | |
| Jean-Philippe Secordel-Martin | ECO | 684 | 1.75 | | |
| Jean-Marc Chipot | DLF | 616 | 1.57 | | |
| Jennifer Varin | DIV | 407 | 1.04 | | |
| René Maiolino | DIV | 258 | 0.66 | | |
| Joseph Markiel | EXG | 169 | 0.43 | | |
| Géraldine Hochet | DIV | 157 | 0.40 | | |
| Votes | | 39,124 | 100.00 | 32,321 | 100.00 |
| Valid votes | | 39,124 | 98.07 | 32,321 | 91.38 |
| Blank votes | | 458 | 1.15 | 2,040 | 5.77 |
| Null votes | | 313 | 0.78 | 1,009 | 2.85 |
| Turnout | | 39,895 | 46.61 | 35,370 | 41.33 |
| Abstentions | | 45,690 | 53.39 | 50,216 | 58.67 |
| Registered voters | | 85,585 | | 85,586 | |
Source: Ministry of the Interior

=== 2012 ===
Summary of the 10 June and 17 June 2012 French legislative in Alpes Maritimes' 4th Constituency election results
| Candidate | Party | | 1st round | | 2nd round | |
| Candidate | Party | | Votes | % | Votes | % |
|---|---|---|---|---|---|---|
| Jean-Claude Guibal | Union for a Popular Movement | UMP | 15,763 | 32.70% | 20,467 | 55.22% |
| Lydia Schenardi | National Front | FN | 11,039 | 22.90% | 16,595 | 44.78% |
| Pascale Gerard | Socialist Party | PS | 9,541 | 19.79% | | |
| Francis Tujague | Left Front | FG | 4,905 | 10.18% | | |
| Stéphane Cherki | Miscellaneous Right | DVD | 4,642 | 9.63% | | |
| Thierry Giorgio | Miscellaneous Right | DVD | 713 | 1.48% | | |
| Jean Philippe Secordel-Martin | Ecologist | ECO | 609 | 1.26% | | |
| Lucien Bella | Ecologist | ECO | 505 | 1.05% | | |
| Nicolas Zahar | Miscellaneous Right | DVD | 361 | 0.75% | | |
| Joseph Markiel | Far Left | EXG | 127 | 0.26% | | |
| Total | | | 48,205 | 100% | 37,062 | 100% |
| Registered voters | | | 84,882 | | 84,882 | |
| Blank/Void ballots | | | 671 | 0.79% | 5,145 | 6.06% |
| Turnout | | | | 57.58% | | 49.72% |
| Abstentions | | | 36,006 | 42.42% | 42,675 | 50.28% |
| Result | | | | | | UMP HOLD | |

=== 2007 ===
Legislative Election 2007: Alpes Maritimes 4th
| Party | Candidate | Votes | % | ±% |
|---|---|---|---|---|
| UMP | Jean-Claude Guibal | 24,797 | 59.50 | |
| PS | Pascale Gerard | 5,688 | 13.65 | |
| FN | Monique Matthieu | 3,552 | 8.52 | |
| MoDem | Philippe Briand | 2,275 | 5.46 | |
| PCF | Brigitte Hourtic | 2,044 | 4.90 | |
| LV | Alain Hervé | 984 | 2.36 | |
| LCR | Patrick Ferruccio | 749 | 1.80 | |
| GE | Monique Baccelli | 447 | 1.07 | |
| MPF | Nedjia Gaignaire | 375 | 0.90 | |
| MNR | Laëtitia Perez | 248 | 0.60 | |
| Independent | René Fiorese | 199 | 0.48 | |
| LO | Xavier Barillot | 184 | 0.44 | |
| MRC | Michèle Borghi-Gastaut | 135 | 0.32 | |
| Turnout | | 4,449 | 57.62 | |
| UMP hold | | Swing | | |

=== 2002 ===
Legislative Election 2002: Alpes-Maritimes's 4th constituency
| Party | Candidate | Votes | % | ±% |
|---|---|---|---|---|
| UMP | Jean-Claude Guibal | 16,075 | 37.73 | |
| FN | Monique Mathieu | 8,507 | 19.97 | |
| DVD | Xavier Beck | 6,923 | 16.25 | |
| PS | Pascale Gérard | 6,866 | 16.11 | |
| PCF | Colette Mo | 1,601 | 3.76 | |
| Others | N/A | 2,636 | | |
| Turnout | | 43,329 | 61.59 | |
2nd round result
| UMP | Jean-Claude Guibal | 22,780 | 68.56 | |
| FN | Monique Mathieu | 10,446 | 31.44 | |
| Turnout | | 37,158 | 52.82 | |
| UMP hold | | | | |

=== 1997 ===
Legislative Election 1997: Alpes-Maritimes's 4th constituency
| Party | Candidate | Votes | % | ±% |
|---|---|---|---|---|
| RPR | Jean-Claude Guibal | 11,327 | 26.79 | |
| FN | Gérard de Gubernatis | 8,675 | 20.52 | |
| RPR | Xavier Beck* | 7,755 | 18.34 | |
| PS | Pascale Gérard-Loïzzo | 7,000 | 16.56 | |
| PCF | Jean-Michel Cuccinelli | 3,585 | 8.48 | |
| Others | N/A | 3,933 | | |
| Turnout | | 43,817 | 64.07 | |
2nd round result
| RPR | Jean-Claude Guibal | 25,416 | 67.67 | |
| FN | Gérard de Gubernatis | 12,145 | 32.33 | |
| Turnout | | 44,010 | 64.39 | |
| RPR hold | | | | |

*RPR dissident

== Sources ==
Results at the Ministry of the Interior (French)
