= Alexandra Masson =

French politician

- Alexandra Masson in 2021

Mayor of Menton
- Incumbent
- Assumed office 28 March 2026
- Preceded by: Yves Juhel

Member of the National Assembly for Alpes-Maritimes's 4th constituency
- In office 22 June 2022 – 21 April 2026
- Preceded by: Alexandra Valetta-Ardisson
- Succeeded by: Gabriel Tomatis

Personal details
- Born: 2 July 1971 (age 55) Nice, France
- Party: National Rally
- Spouse: Olivier Bettati (divorced)
- Parent: Hélène Masson-Maret (mother)

Alexandra Masson (born 2 July 1971) is a French politician from National Rally (RN) who has represented the 4th constituency of Alpes-Maritimes in the National Assembly from 2022 to 2026.

== Biography ==
Daughter of Hélène Masson-Maret, she is divorced from Olivier Bettati. In the 2026 French municipal elections she was elected mayor of Menton.

== See also ==
- List of deputies of the 16th National Assembly of France
