= Laurence Trastour-Isnart =

French politician

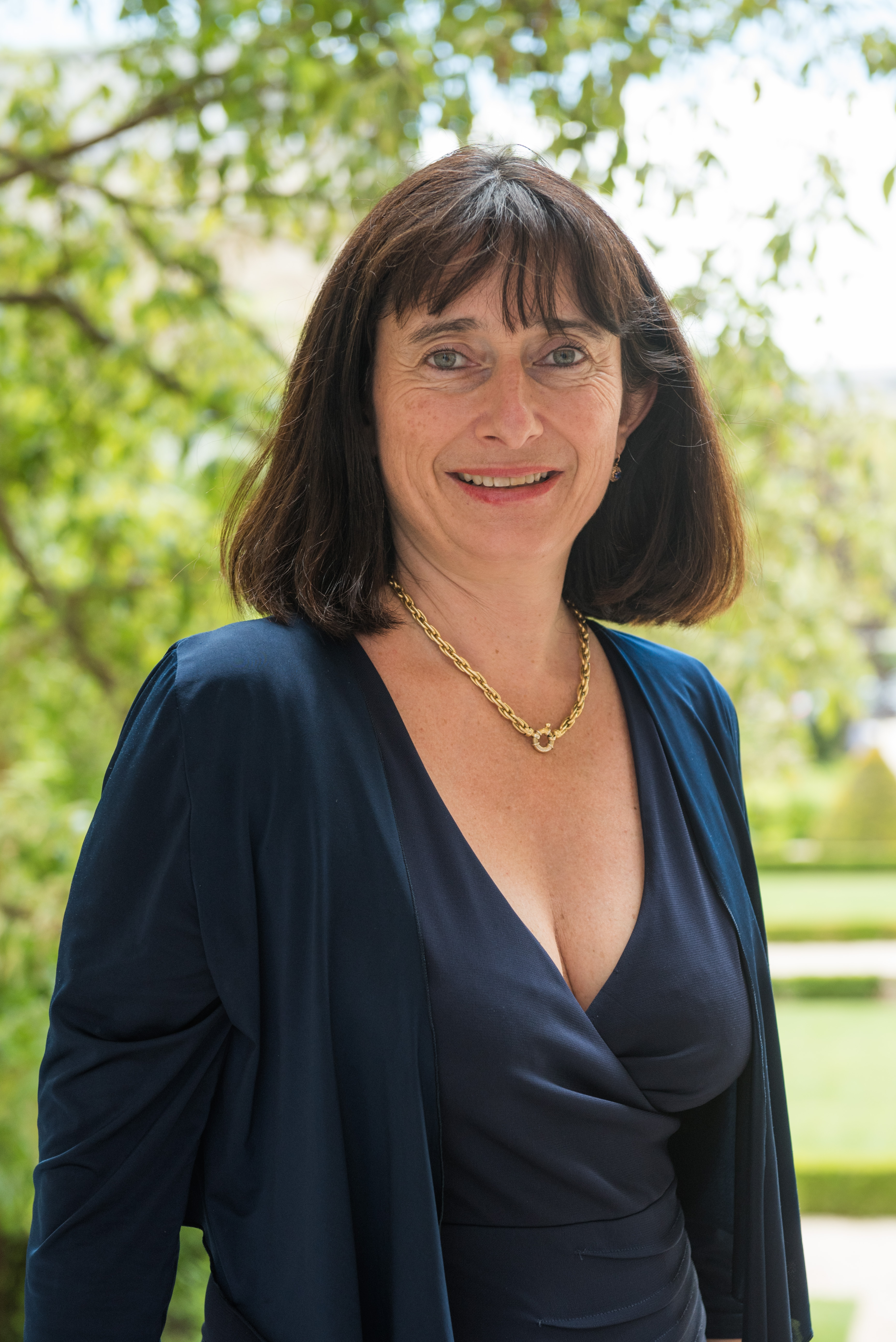

Member of the French National Assembly for Alpes-Maritimes's 6th constituency
- In office 21 June 2017 – June 2022

Member of the Regional council of Provence-Alpes-Côte d'Azur
- Incumbent
- Assumed office 18 December 2015

Member of the Municipal council of Cagnes-sur-Mer
- Incumbent
- Assumed office 1998

Member of the Métropole council of Métropole Nice Côte d'Azur
- In office 2014–2016

Personal details
- Born: 6 March 1972 (age 54) Cagnes-sur-Mer, France
- Party: The Republicans
- Profession: Civil servant

Laurence Trastour-Isnart (born 6 March 1972) is a French politician representing The Republicans.

== Political career ==
=== Career in local politics ===
Trastour-Isnart was elected municipal councilor of Cagnes-sur-Mer, a delegate for early childhood, from 1998 to 2001. From 2001 to 2017, she was deputy mayor. Between 2014 and 2016, she sits in the Nice Côte d'Azur metropolis.

In 2015, Trastour-Isnart was elected regional councilor for the Provence-Alpes-Côte d'Azur region on Christian Estrosi's list. She is vice-chair of the "high school, apprenticeship, vocational training" commission.

=== Member of the National Assembly ===
Trastour-Isnart was elected to the French National Assembly on 18 June 2017, representing Alpes-Maritimes's 6th constituency. In parliament, Trastour-Isnart is a member of the Defense Committee.

In addition to her committee assignments, Trastour-Isnart serves as president of the France-Slovenia group and vice-president of friendship groups with Sweden, Ireland Peru, Brunei-Malaysia, Kazakhstan and North Macedonia. She is also secretary of a dozen friendship groups, including the France-Monaco and France-Finland friendship groups

In addition, Trastour-Isnart participates in several friendship groups such with Israel, South Korea or South Africa She is also part of several international study groups such as the one on relations with the Holy See. or the one on questions related to the expansion of the Taiwanese economy

Since 2022, Trastour-Isnart has also been a member of the French delegation to the Parliamentary Assembly of the Council of Europe (PACE). In the Assembly, he serves on the Committee on Social Affairs, Health and Sustainable Development.

In the Republicans' 2017 leadership election, Trastour-Isnart endorsed Laurent Wauquiez as chairman.

She lost her seat in the first round of the 2022 French legislative election.

== Personal life ==
Trastour-Isnart is married and has three children

== See also ==
- 2017 French legislative election
