= Compañía de Minas Buenaventura =

Peruvian precious metals company

Compañia de Mínas Buenaventura S.A.A.
- Traded as: BVL: BVN; NYSE: BVN
- Industry: Mining
- Founded: (1953)
- Headquarters: Lima, Peru
- Key people: Roque Benavides (Chairman of the Board)
- Products: Precious metals
- Revenue: ▲US$ 1.4 Billion (2010)
- Net income: ▲US$ 667.6 Million (2010)
- Subsidiaries: El Brocal
- Website: www.buenaventura.com/en/ (in English)

Compañia de Minas Buenaventura is a Peruvian precious metals company engaged in the mining and exploration of gold, silver and other metals.

== Operations ==
Buenaventura is Peru's largest publicly traded stock on the New York Stock Exchange.

They specialize in mineral exploration, mining development and precious metal processing, especially lead, zinc, copper, silver, and gold.

== Ownership ==
Buenaventura owns a 19.58% stake in Sociedad Minera Cerro Verde, a major copper producer.

== See also ==
- Theta Gold Mines
- Allied Gold (Canada)
