= Crespo =

Crespo is a Spanish, Portuguese and Italian surname and a place name, meaning "curly". A more common Italian form of the surname is Crespi. It may refer to:

== People ==
=== General ===
- Alejandro Crespo (trade unionist), Argentine trade unionist, general secretary of SUTNA since 2016
- Ana Crespo (born 1948), Spanish lichenologist
- Andrea Crespo (artist) (born 1993), New York-based artist
- Andrea Crespo (writer) (born 1983), Ecuadorian writer
- Andrés Crespo (actor) (born 1970), Ecuadorian actor
- Ángel Crespo (1926–1995), Spanish poet and translator
- António Cândido Gonçalves Crespo (1846–1883), Brazilian-born Portuguese poet
- Audrey Crespo-Mara (born 1976), French journalist and television presenter
- Clotilde Crespo de Arvelo (1887–?), Venezuelan poet and novelist
- Daniel Fernández Crespo (1901–1964), Uruguayan political figure
- Diane Crespo (born 1961), U.S. film producer and director
- Domingo Crespo (1793–1871), Argentine politician
- Eduardo Alonso-Crespo (born 1956), Argentine opera composer
- Elvis Crespo (Díaz, born 1971), Puerto Rican-American merengue singer
- Enrique Barón Crespo (born 1944), Spanish politician, economist, and lawyer
- Ernesto Horacio Crespo (1929–2019), Argentine brigadier general
- Esteban Crespo (1911-date of death unknown), Mexican athlete
- Evaristo Crespo Azorín (1863–1941), Spanish lawyer, politician and professor
- Fred Crespo (born ?), U.S. (Illinoisan) politician
- Gilberto Crespo y Martínez (1853–1917), Mexican diplomat and writer
- Gonçalves Crespo (1846–1883), Brazilian-born Portuguese poet
- Gonzalo Ramiro del Castillo Crespo (1936-2019), Bolivian Roman Catholic Archbishop of La Paz
- Hernán Crespo Toral (1937–2008), Ecuadorian architect, archeologist and museologist
- Ismael Crespo Martínez (born 1964), political scientist and expert in Latin America
- Jimmy Crespo (born 1954), U.S. guitarist
- Joaquín Crespo (Torres, 1841–1898), Venezuelan politician and soldier
- José Crespo (disambiguation), various people
- Jorge Juan Crespo de la Serna (1887–1978), Mexican artist, art critic, and historian
- Julio Crespo MacLennan, Spanish academic, historian and published author
- June Crespo (born 1982), Spanish artist
- Luis Cordero Crespo (Cordero y Crespo, 1833–1912), Ecuadorian president (1892–'95)
- Manuel Revollo Crespo (1925–2014), Roman Catholic auxiliary bishop of the Archdiocese of Cochabamba, Bolivia
- María Isabel Crespo de Lebed (born 1960), Ecuadorian journalist, reporter, and news presenter
- Marcos Crespo (born 1980), U.S. (New Yorker) politician
- María del Carmen Crespo Díaz (born ?), Spanish politician
- Mário Crespo (born 1947), Portuguese journalist and reporter
- Mauricio Pozo Crespo (born 1959), Ecuadorian politician, banker and economist
- Paul Crespo (born 1964), U.S. political commentator, consultant, and activist
- Remigio Crespo Toral (1860–1939), Ecuadorian writer
- Rodrigo Crespo (born 1979), Argentine musician, producer, songwriter, and performer
- Rolando Crespo (born 1975), Puerto Rican politician
- Rosangela Abreu Crespo (born 1983), Dominican-born Puerto Rican singer
- Vítor Pereira Crespo (1932–2014), Portuguese politician
- Yadira Serrano Crespo (born 1976), Mexican politician affiliated with the Party of the Democratic Revolution
- Yosuán Crespo (born 1984), Cuban businessman and computer scientist
- Andrea Crespo (writer) (born 1983), Ecuadorian writer

=== Spanish Counts of Castillo Fiel ===
- Alfonso Crespo, 6th Count of Castillo Fiel (fl. 1873–1910)
- Carlos Crespo, 7th Count of Castillo Fiel (1911–1963)
- Eduardo Crespo, 8th Count of Castillo Fiel (fl. 1963–1989)

=== Sports ===
- Albert Torras Crespo (born 1996), Spanish football midfielder
- Alberto Crespo (1920–1991), Argentine race car driver
- Andrés Crespo (fencer) (born 1968), Spanish Olympian fencer
- Antoine Crespo (born 1955), Andorran alpine skier
- César Crespo (born 1979), Puerto Rican baseball player
- Cristóbal Márquez Crespo (born 1984), Spanish footballer
- David Alexandre Pereira Crespo (born 1994), Portuguese footballer
- Édgar Crespo (born 1989), Panamanian Olympian swimmer
- Felipe Crespo (born 1973), Puerto Rican baseball player
- Hernán Crespo (born 1975), Argentine footballer
- Iñaki Gastón Crespo (born 1963), Spanish road bicycle racer
- Israel Crespo (1986–2007), Puerto Rican boxer
- Iván Crespo (born 1984), Spanish footballer
- Javier Crespo, Spanish Paralympic swimmer
- Jesus Muñoz Crespo (1899–1979), Portuguese footballer
- Joan Crespo (born 1988), Spanish slalom canoer
- José Crespo (disambiguation), various people
- Joseph Crespo, French rugby union and rugby league footballer who played in the 1940s and 1950s
- Miguel Crespo da Silva (born 1996), Portuguese professional footballer
- Milagros Crespo (born 1979), Cuban Olympic beach volleyball player
- Rogelio Crespo (1894–1985), Cuban baseball player
- Salvador Crespo (born 1983), Spanish distance runner

== Places ==
- Crespo, Entre Ríos, Argentine city in the province of Entre Ríos
- Crespo mine, Peruvian silver mine in the Ayacucho region
- Crespo Municipality, Venezuelan municipality in the state of Lara
- Ejutla de Crespo, Mexican city and a municipality in the state of Oaxaca
- José Crespo y Castillo District, Peruvian district in the province of Leoncio Prado
- Preto do Crespo River, Brazilian river in the state of Rondônia
- Rio Crespo, Brazilian municipality in the state of Rondônia
- Villa Crespo, Argentine neighbourhood of Buenos Aires
- Villa Crespo y San Andrés, Uruguayan town in the department of Canelones

== Other ==
- Nexus S, Android phone with the codename Crespo

== See also ==
- Crespos, Spanish municipality
- Crespos (Braga), Portuguese parish
