= Andrea Crespo =

Andrea Crespo may refer to:

- Andrea Crespo (artist) (born 1993), New York-based artist
- Andrea Crespo (writer) (born 1983), Ecuadorian writer
