= Zarzis =

Zarzis جرجيس
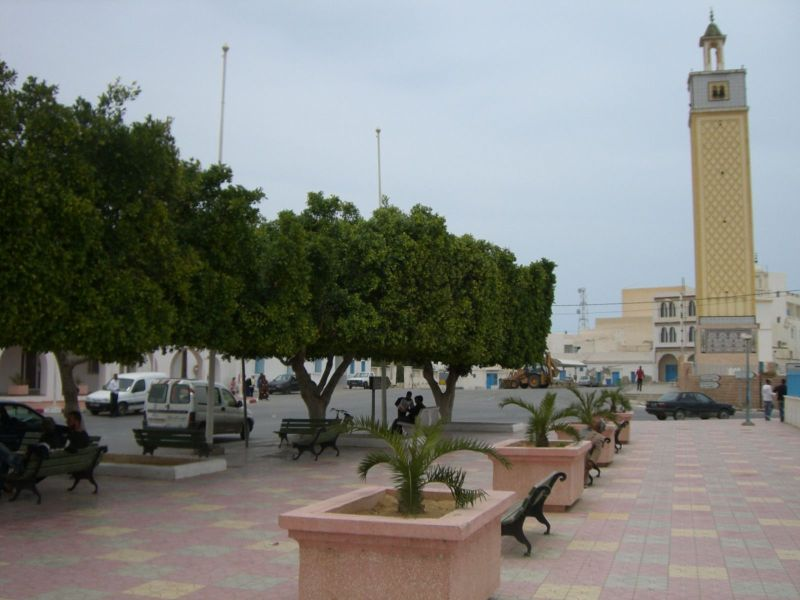
- The mosque of Zarzis
- Nickname: "درّة الجنوب" (dorrat al-janoub) which means "The Pearl of the South"
- Location within Tunisia
- Coordinates: 33°30′N 11°7′E
- Country: Tunisia
- Governorate: Médenine Governorate

Government
  - Mayor: Mekki Laraiedh (Ennahdha)

Area
  - Total: 340 km^{2} (130 sq mi)
- Elevation: 18 m (59 ft)

Population (2014)
  - Total: 78,766
- Time zone: UTC+1 (CET)
  - Summer (DST): UTC+2 (CEST)

Zarzis, also known as Jarjis (Arabic: جرجيس gergīs / zerzīs), is a coastal commune (municipality) in southeastern Tunisia, former bishopric and Latin Catholic titular see under its ancient name Gergis.

To the Phoenicians, Romans and Berbers the port was of strategic importance.

== Geography ==
It lies on the coast of the Mediterranean, where the climate is mainly dry and sunny, making it a popular tourist destination mixing the old and the traditional. It has a major port where a park of economic activities is based.

Located at the southern end of the eastern peninsula that bears his name, the délégation (district) of Zarzis has a very large coastline. There are a variety of landscapes reflecting a great diversity of climatic conditions.

=== Buildings and structures ===
- 320-metre-high guyed mast for FM/TV-broadcasting, tallest structure in Tunisia.

== History ==
The city was known in Antiquity as Gergis and located at the western end of the Lesser Syrtis (Gulf of Gabès), not far from the island of Meninx (current Djerba). The town may owe its name and/or origin to the Biblical tribes of Girgashites which, according to ancient Jewish writers, had left the Canaan at the time of Joshua and went to settle in North Africa.

According to Stadiasme, it had a castle, where stood the ruins and a citadel modern still bearing the old name albeit now pronounced Zarzis, and a (navy) port.

Gergis was important enough in the Roman province of Tripolitania (in the papal sway) to become a suffragan bishopric, which was to fade, presumably at the seventh century advent of Islam. Its ecclesiastical history is confused, due to confusion in consulting the Latin sources with the near-homonymous diocese Girba (modern Djerba).

== Titular see ==
The diocese was nominally restored in 1933 as a Latin Catholic titular bishopric of Gergis (Latin) / Gergi (Curiate Italian) / Gergitan(us) (Latin adjective).

It has had the following incumbents, so far of the fitting Episcopal (lowest) rank :

- John van Sambeek, White Fathers (M. Afr.) (1936.11.19 – 1953.03.25)
- Otàvio Barbosa Aguiar (1954.11.06 – 1956.02.24)
- Luis Aníbal Rodríguez Pardo (1956.07.28 – 1958.05.22) as Auxiliary Bishop of Diocese of Cochabamba (Bolivia) (1956.07.28 – 1958.05.22); previously Titular Bishop of Thennesus (1952.06.06 – 1953.06.17) & Auxiliary Bishop of Diocese of Santa Cruz de la Sierra (Bolivia) (1952.06.06 – 1953.06.17), then Bishop of Oruro (Bolivia) (1953.06.17 – 1956.07.28); later last suffragan Bishop of Santa Cruz de la Sierra (Bolivia) (1958.05.22 – 1975.07.30), Military Vicar of Bolivia (Bolivia) (1961.07.26 – 1975.07.30), promoted first Metropolitan Archbishop of Santa Cruz de la Sierra (1975.07.30 – 1991.02.06), also President of Episcopal Conference of Bolivia (1980 – 1985)
- Luigi Oldani (1961.10.31 – 1976.08.05)
- Antonio María Rouco Varela (1976.09.17 – 1984.05.09) as Auxiliary Bishop of Archdiocese of Santiago de Compostela (Galicia, Spain) (1976.09.17 – 1984.05.09) and as Apostolic Administrator of Santiago de Compostela (1983.06.11 – 1984.05.09); next succeeded as Metropolitan Archbishop of Santiago de Compostela (1984.05.09 – 1994.07.28), Metropolitan Archbishop of Madrid (Spain) (1994.07.28 – retired 2014.08.28), created Cardinal-Priest of S. Lorenzo in Damaso (1998.02.21 [1998.10.11] – ...), President of Episcopal Conference of Spain (1999.03.02 – 2005.03.08 & 2008.03.04 – 2014.03.12), Member of Council of Cardinals for the Study of Organisational and Economic Problems of the Apostolic See (2004.12.16 – 2014.02.24)
- Patricio Infante Alfonso (1984.08.07 – 1990.12.12) as Auxiliary Bishop of Archdiocese of Santiago de Chile (Chile) (1984.08.07 – 1990.12.12); later Metropolitan Archbishop of Antofagasta (Chile) (1990.12.12 – 2004.11.26)
- Jurij Bizjak (2000.05.13 – 2012.05.26) as Auxiliary Bishop of Diocese of Koper (Slovenia) (2000.05.13 – 2012.05.26); next succeeded as Bishop of Koper (2012.05.26 – ...)

BIOs to ELABORATE

- Sérgio de Deus Borges (2012.06.27 – ...), Auxiliary Bishop of Archdiocese of São Paulo (Brazil)

== Economy ==
Economic activity of Zarzis is mainly based on tourism, fishing and agriculture; in industry, the food sector dominates with 55 of 89 firms.

The olive occupies a special place in Zarzis where there are 1,228,700 feet occupying an area of 61,335 hectares of which 85% are in full production. Production of the campaign 1999 - 2000 reached 59,500 tons olives, equivalent to 11,900 tons of olive oil. This production is processed through the 57 mills of the delegation and provides more than 5,000 direct jobs. In 2011, the city is the scene of stowaway to Europe. The local economy is diverse—agriculture, mainly olives, oil and tourism.

== People from Zarzis ==
- Abid Briki (born 1957), trade unionist and politician

== See also ==
- Gergis and Girba for (near-)namesakes
- List of Catholic dioceses in Tunisia
- List of Catholic titular sees
- Mouansa Synagogue
- Zarzis Synagogue

== Gallery ==
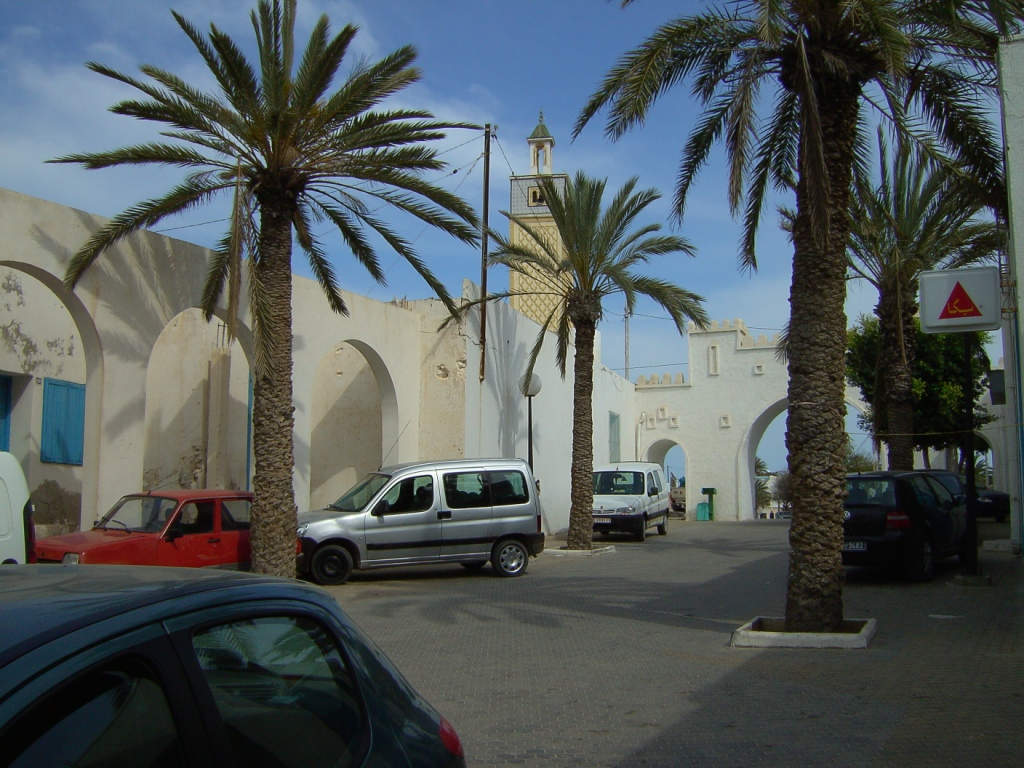

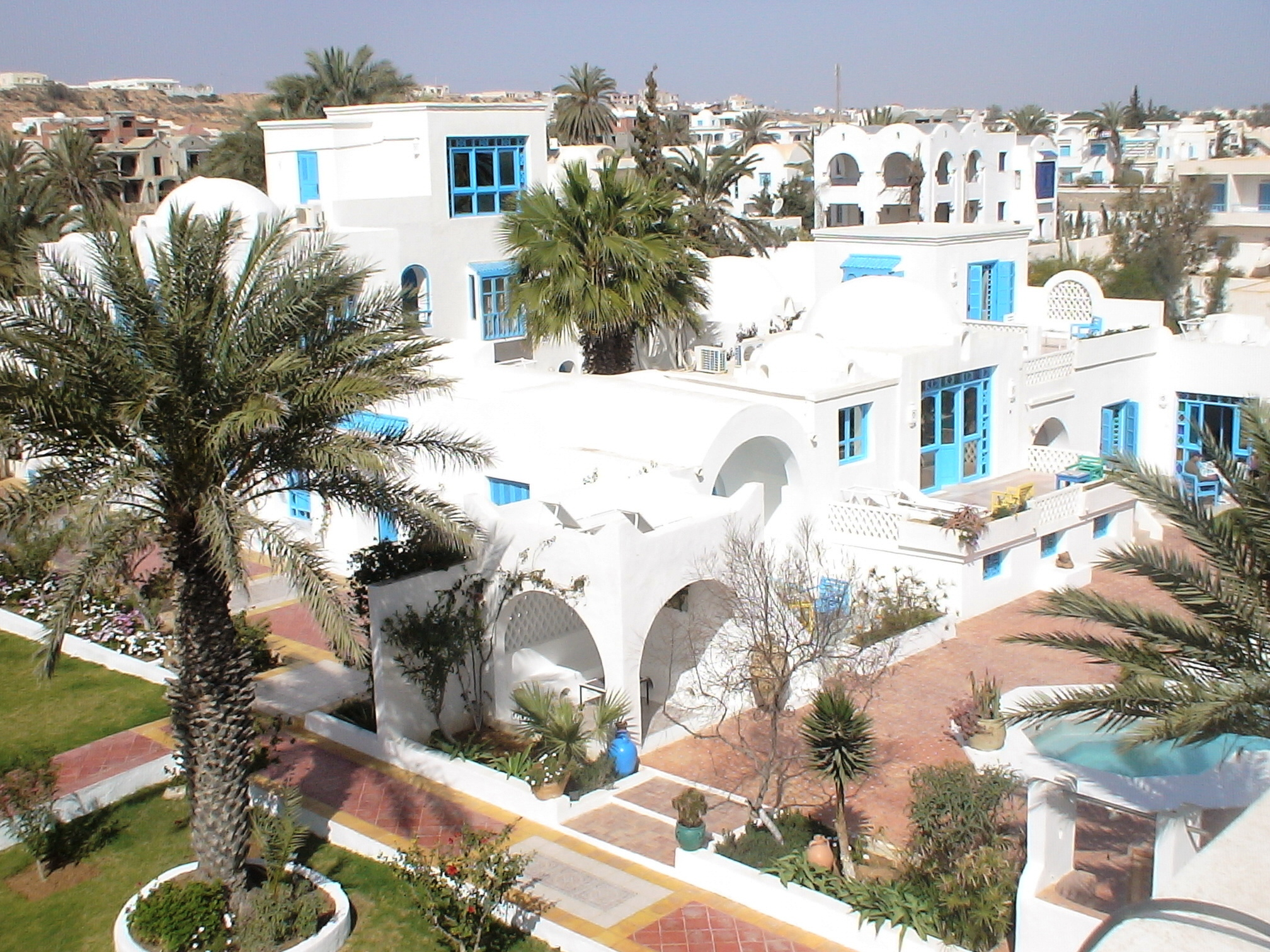

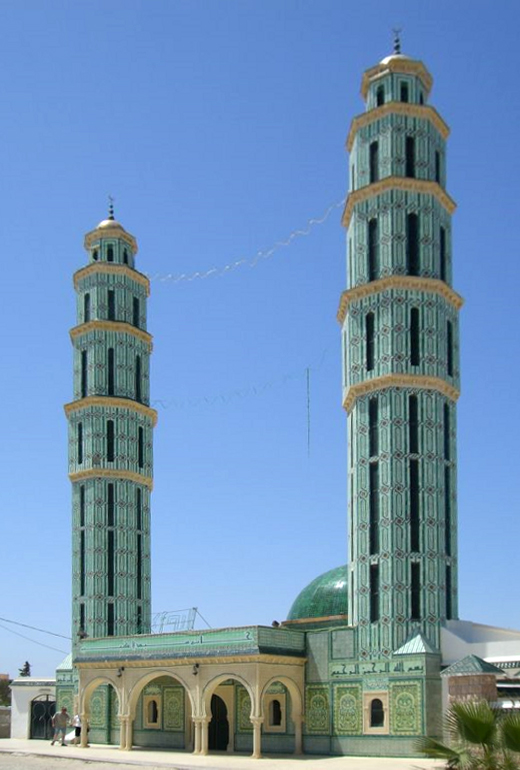

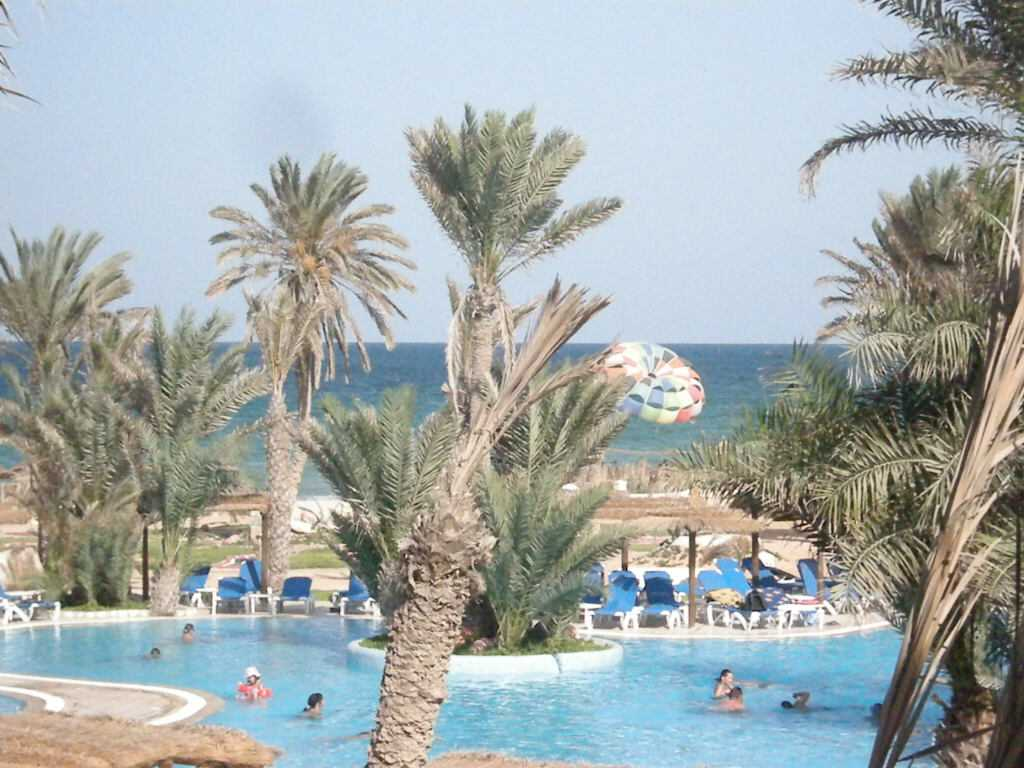

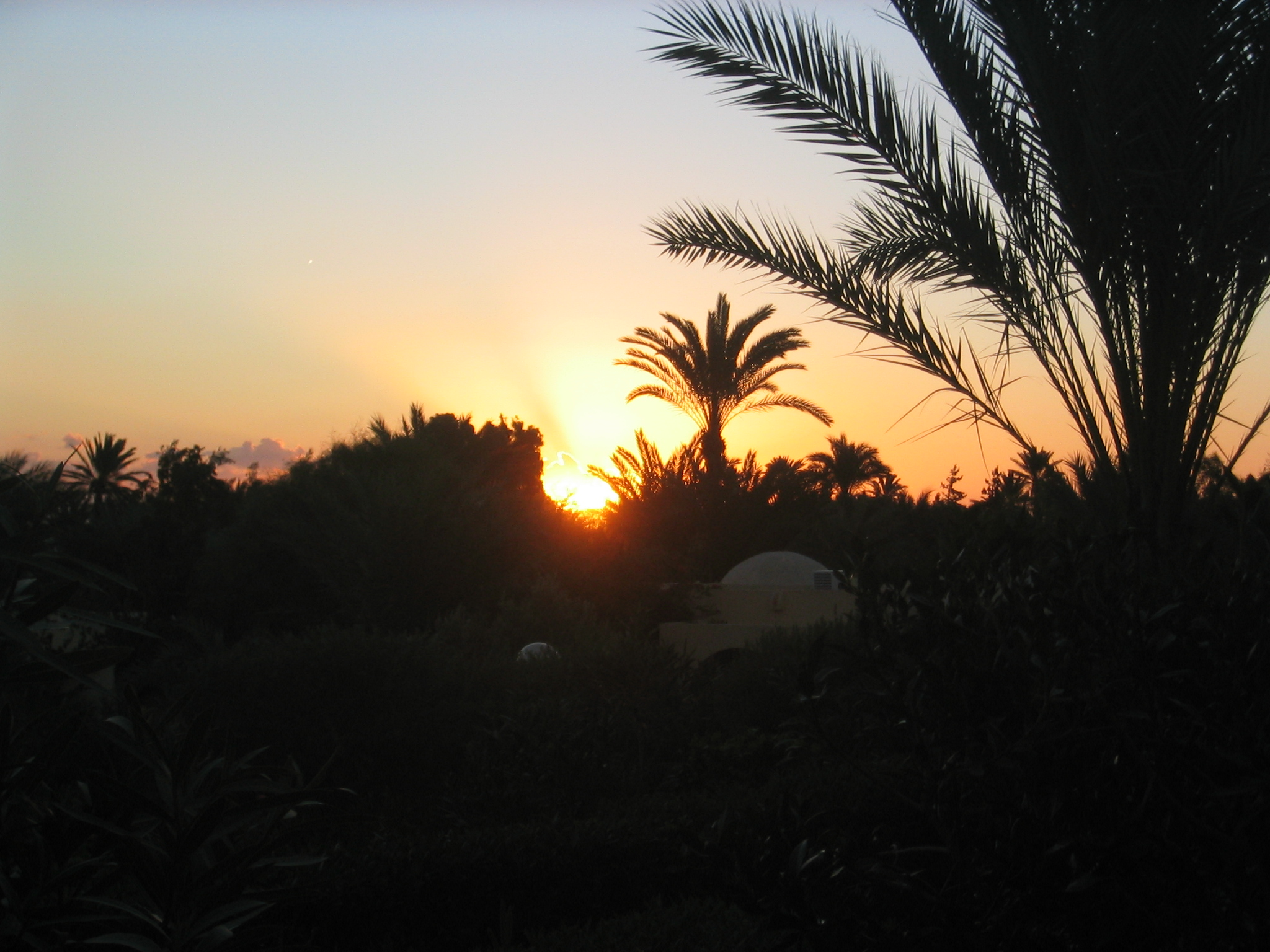

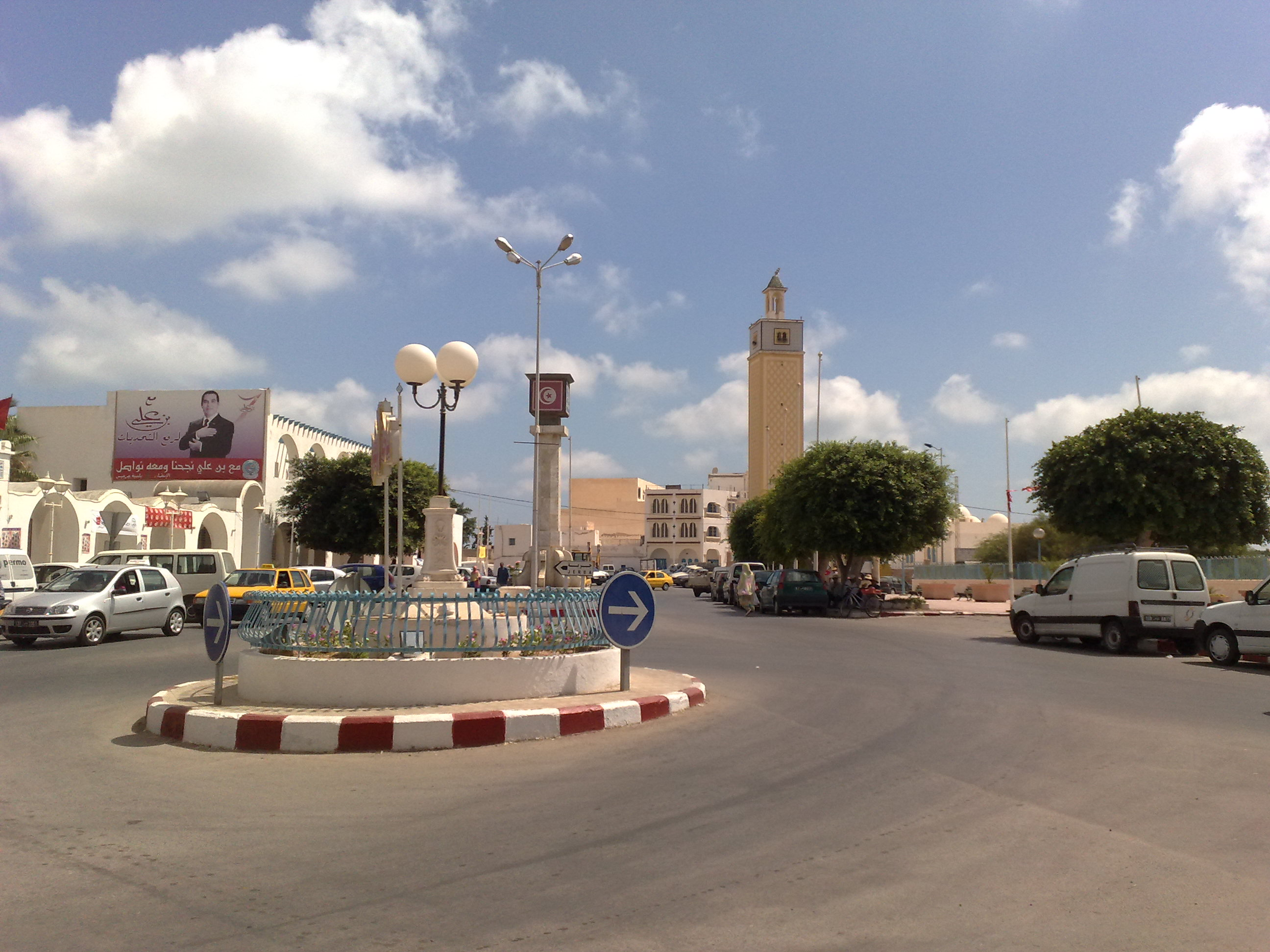

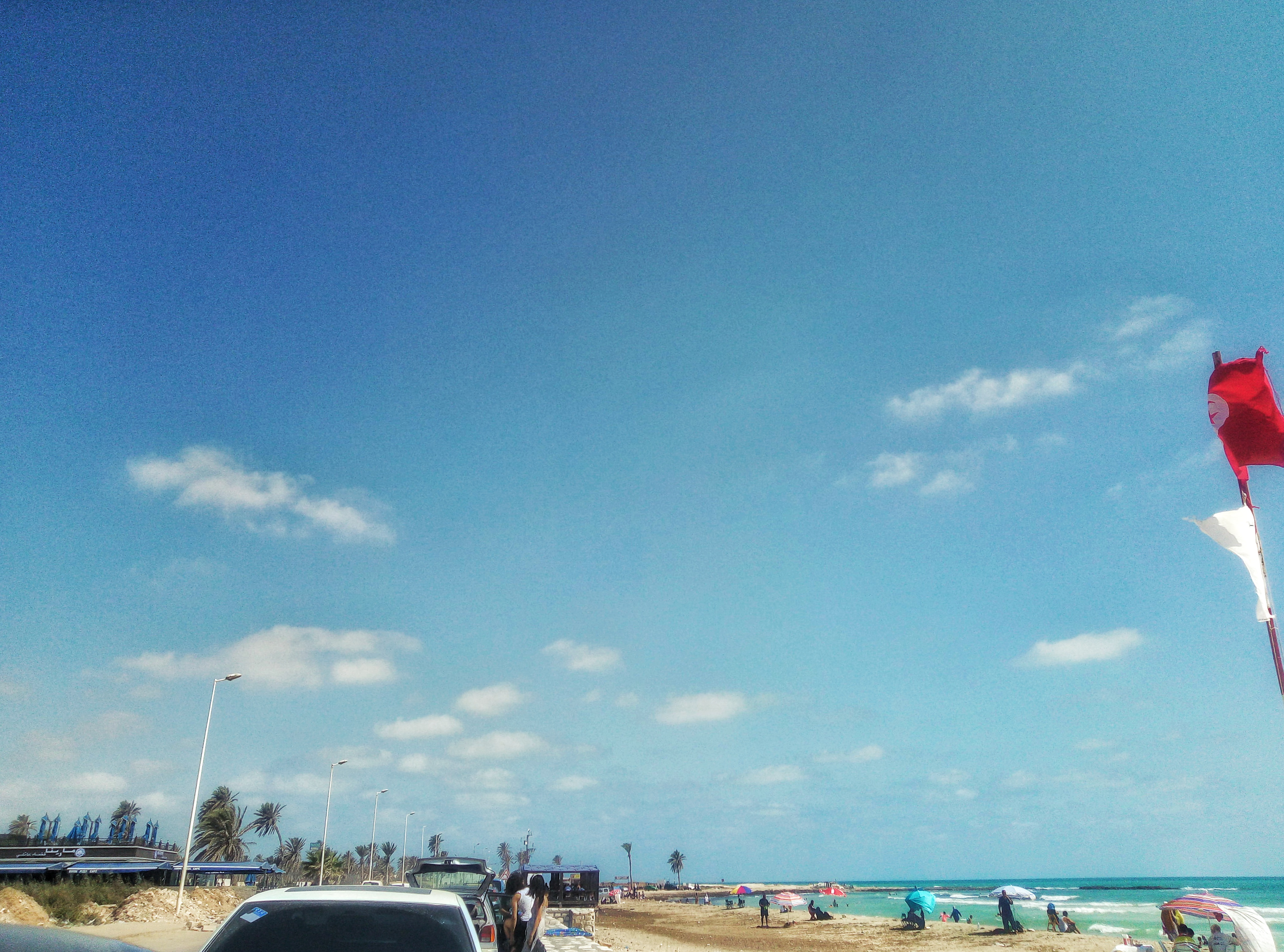

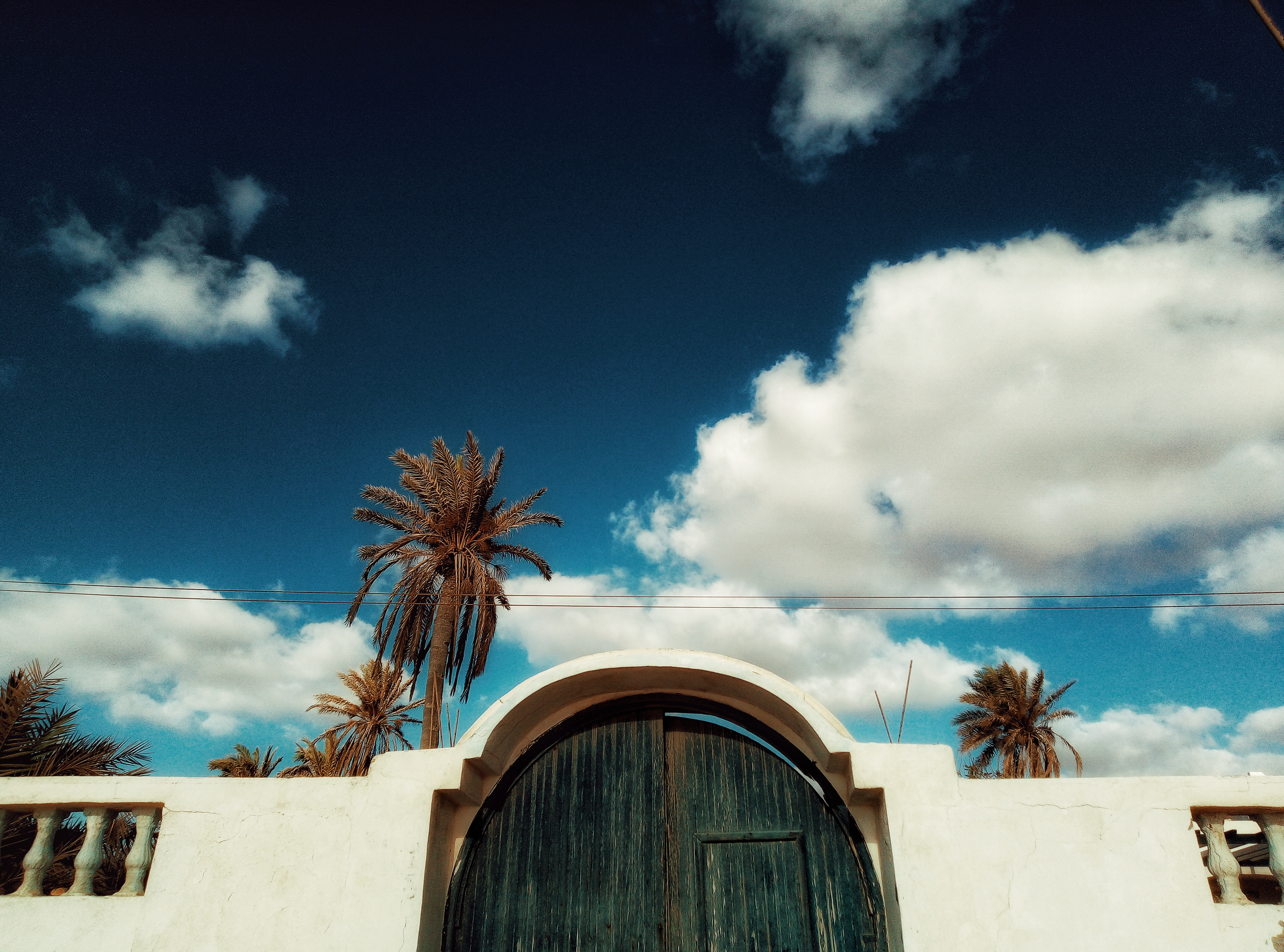

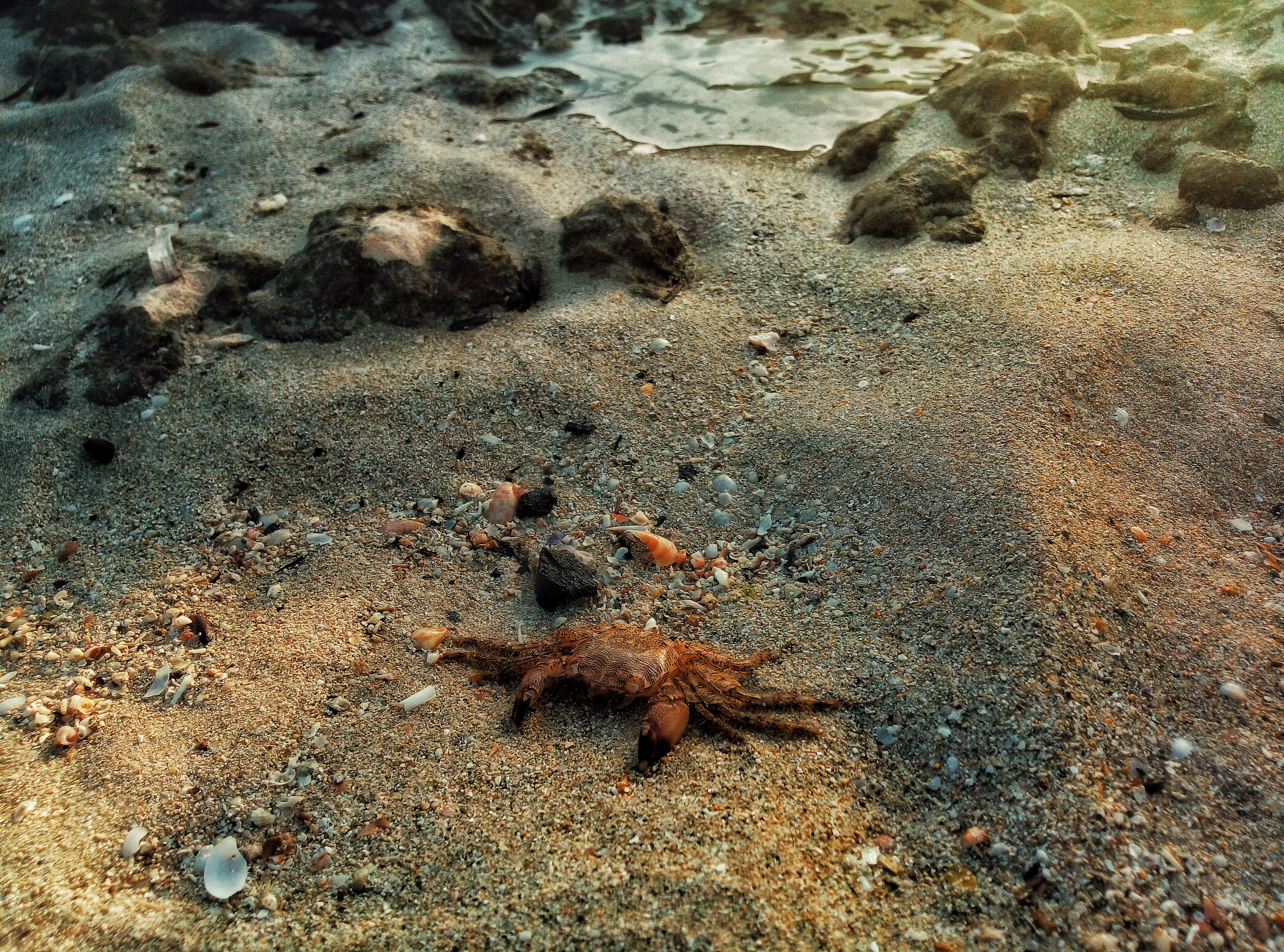

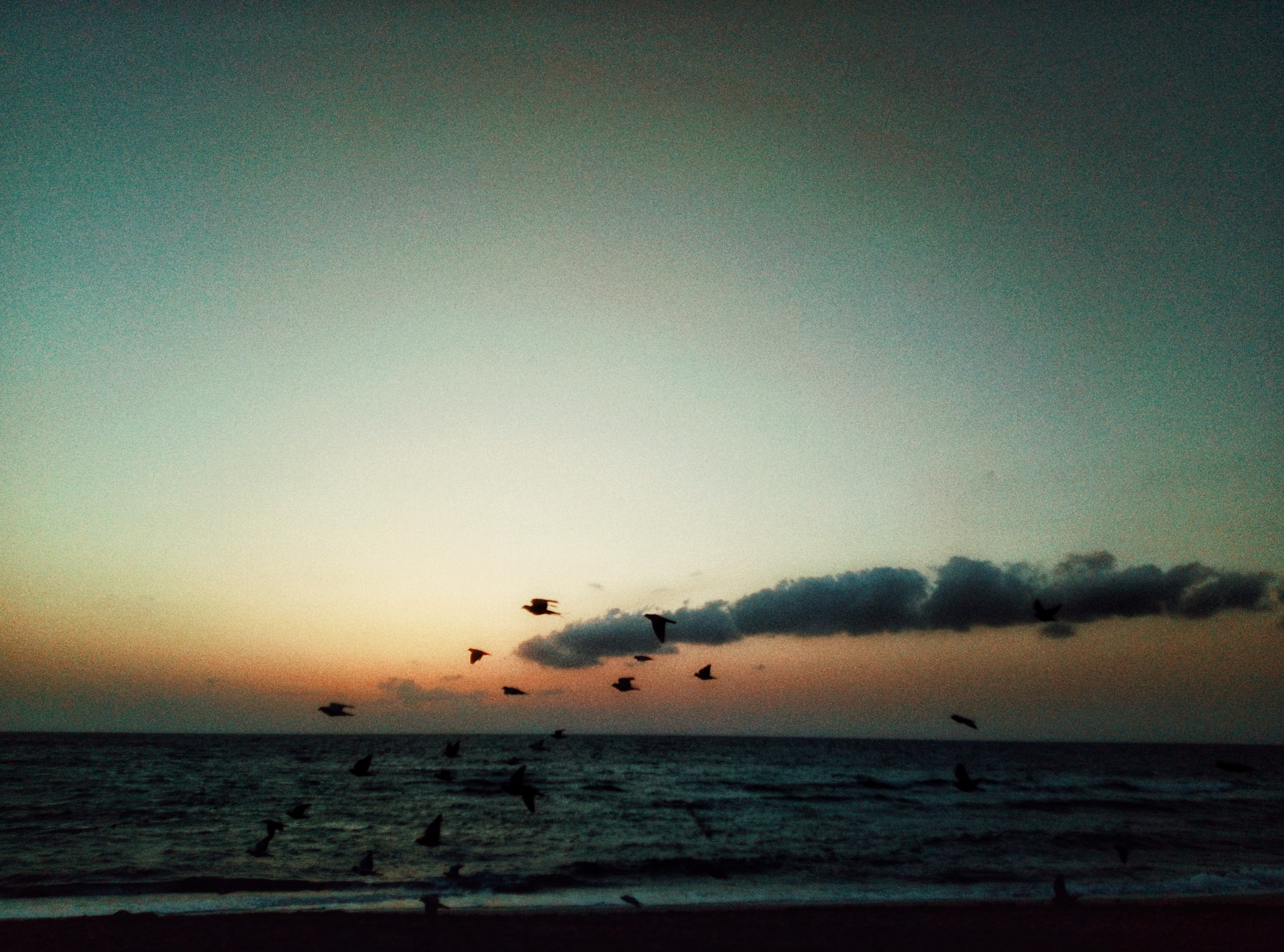

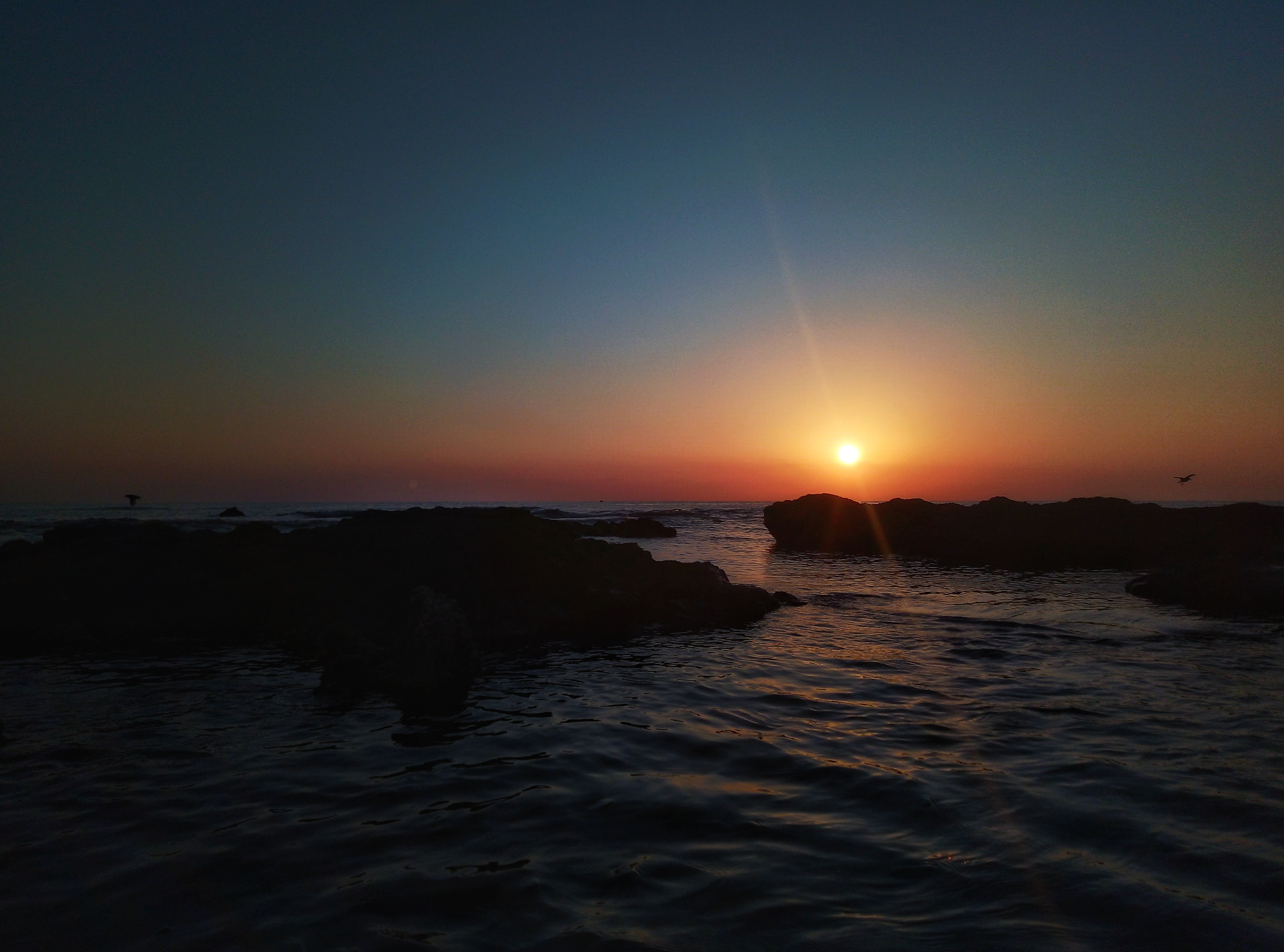

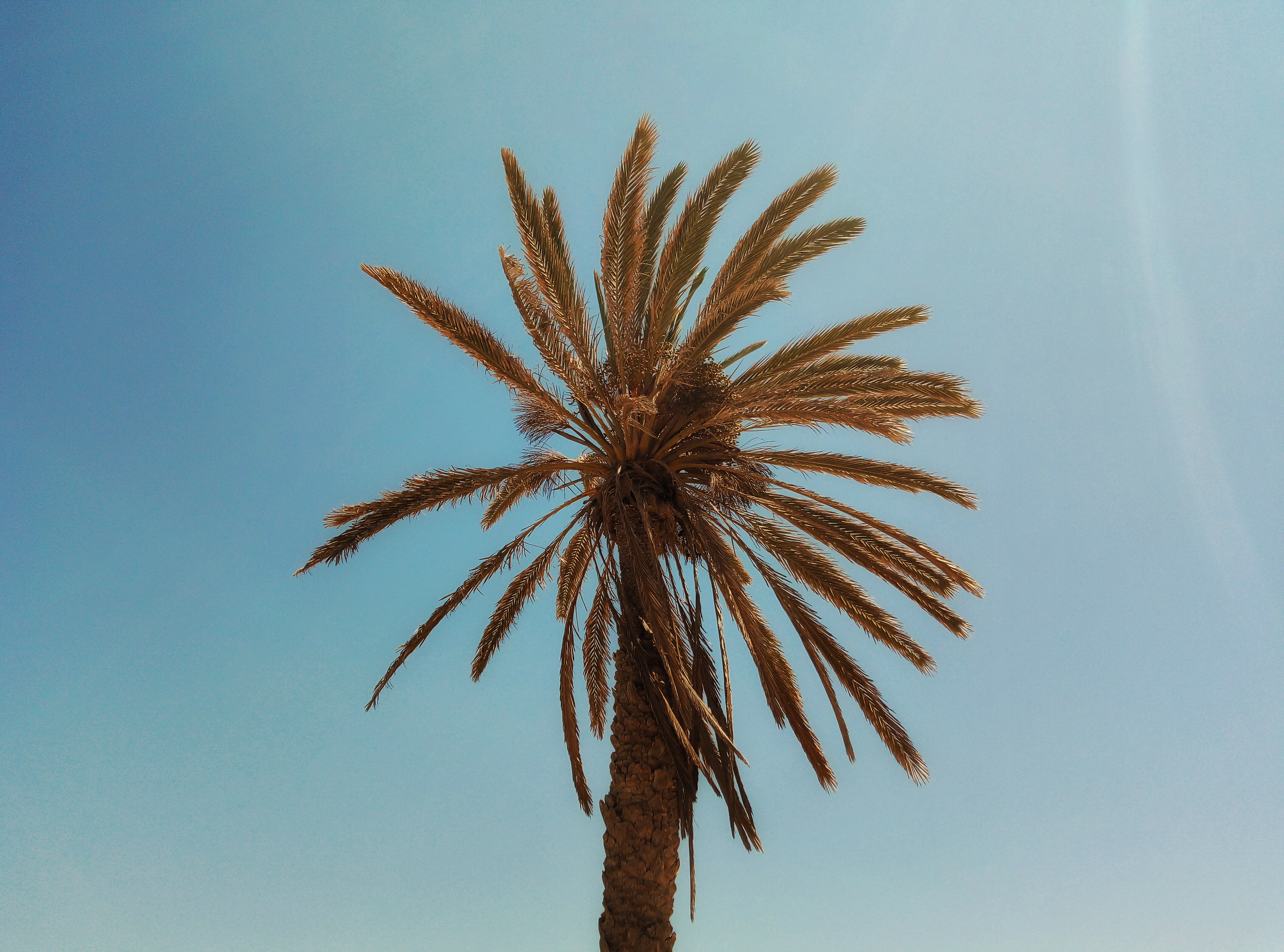

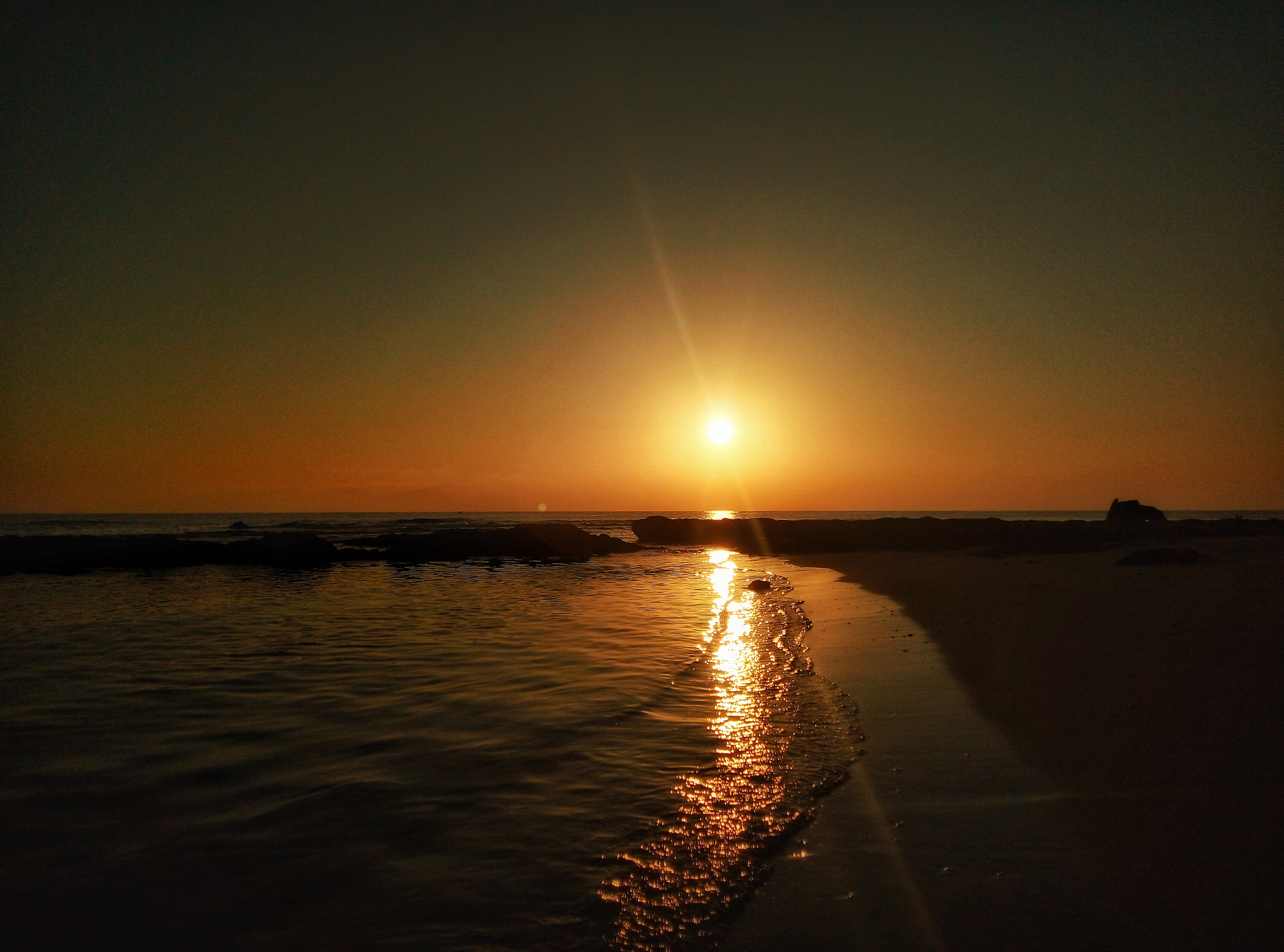

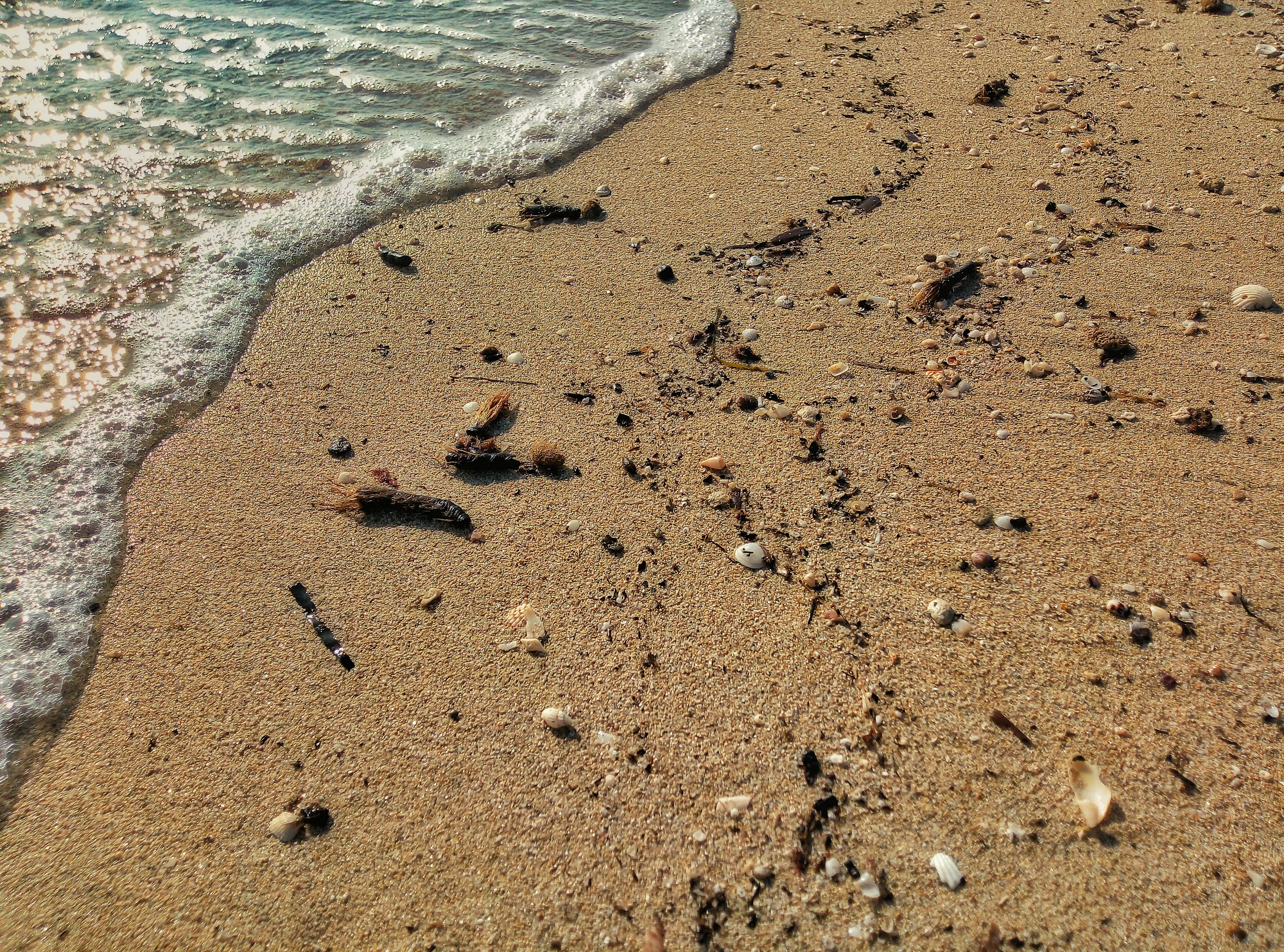

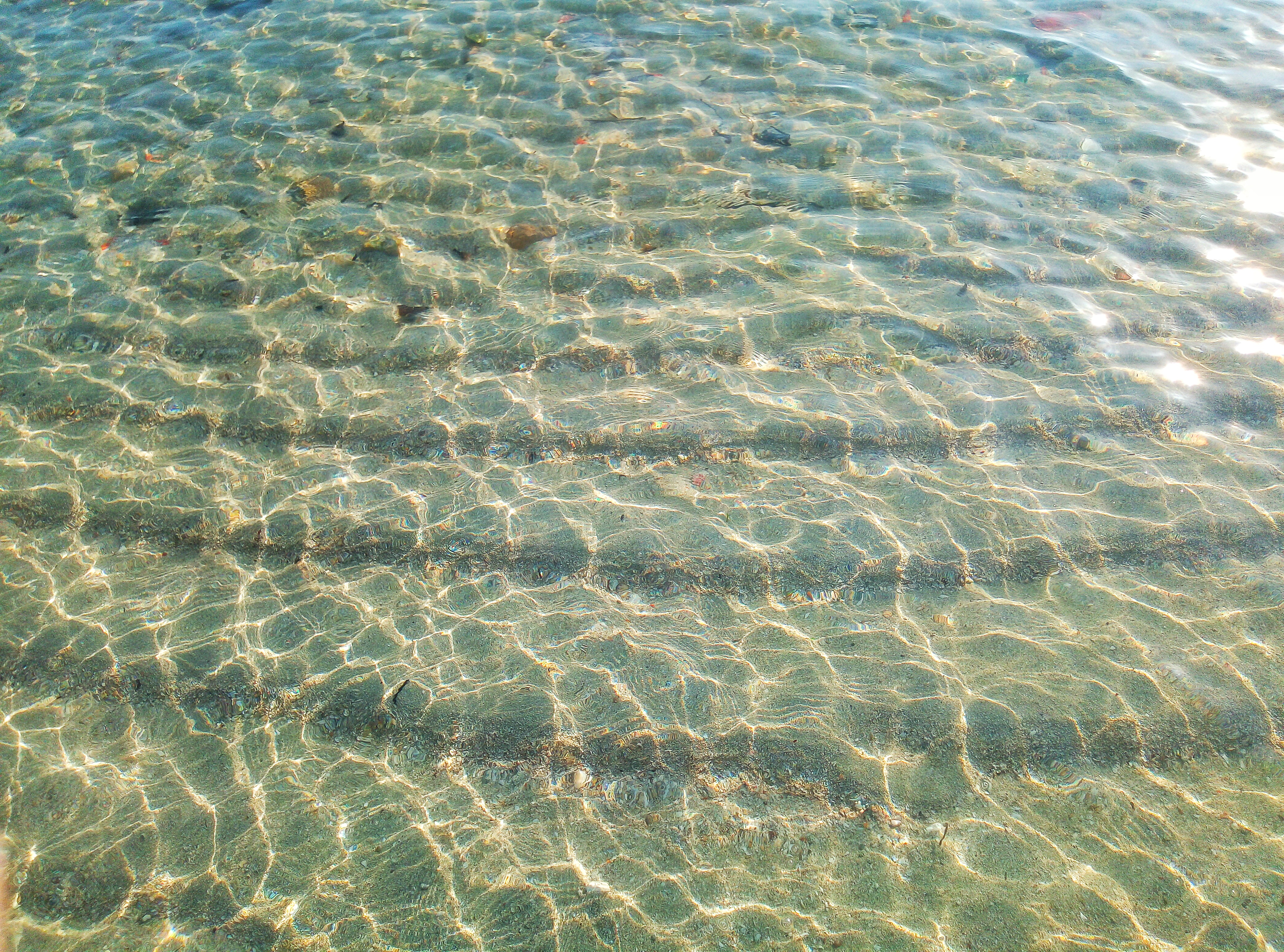

== Sources and external links ==
- GCatholic, with titular incumbent bio links

Bibliography - ecclesiastical history

- Anatole-Joseph Toulotte, Géographie de l'Afrique chrétienne. Byzacène et Tripolitaine, Montreuil-sur-mer, 1894, pp. 247–251
- J. Mesnage, L'Afrique chrétienne, Paris, 1912, p. 170

Media related to Zarzis at Wikimedia Commons
