= Military Ordinariate of Bolivia =

Catholic ecclesiastical jurisdiction in Bolivia

Military Bishopric of Bolivia Ordinariatus Militaris Boliviensis Obispado Castrense de Bolivia

Location
- Country: Bolivia
- Ecclesiastical province: Immediately exempt to the Holy See

Information
- Denomination: Catholic Church
- Sui iuris church: Latin Church
- Rite: Roman Rite
- Established: 19 March 1961 (65 years ago)
- Cathedral: Cathedral of Our Lady of Luján in Irpavi, La Paz

Current leadership
- Pope: Leo XIV
- Apostolic Administrator: Pedro Luis Fuentes Valencia, C.P.

The Military Bishopric of Bolivia (Latin: Ordinariatus Militaris Boliviensis, Spanish: Obispado Castrense de Bolivia) is a Latin Church military ordinariate of the Catholic Church. Immediately exempt to the Holy See, it provides pastoral care to Catholics serving in the Bolivian Armed Forces and their families.

== History ==
It was created as a military vicariate on 19 March 1961, with the first military vicar appointed on 26 July 1961. It was elevated to a military ordinariate on 21 July 1986.

The military ordinary's seat is located at the Cathedral of Our Lady of Luján (Catedral Nuestra Señora de Luján) in the Irpavi district of the city of La Paz.

== Office holders ==
=== Military vicars ===
- Luis Aníbal Rodríguez Pardo (appointed 26 July 1961 – translated to the Archdiocese of Santa Cruz de la Sierra 30 July 1975)
- René Fernández Apaza (appointed 30 July 1975 – became military ordinary 21 July 1986)

=== Military ordinaries ===
- René Fernández Apaza (appointed 21 July 1986 – resigned 17 May 1986)
- Mario Lezana Vaca (appointed 17 May 1986 – retired 14 April 2000)
- Manuel Revollo Crespo, Coadjutor bishop, (8 September 1993 – retired 14 April 2000)
- Gonzalo Ramiro del Castillo Crespo, OCD (appointed 14 April 2000 – retired 4 April 2012)
- Oscar Omar Aparicio Céspedes (4 April 2012 – translated to the Archdiocese of Cochabamba 24 September 2014)
- Fernando Bascopé Müller (24 September 2014 – resigned 29 June 2022)
  - Apostolic Administrator Pedro Luis Fuentes Valencia, C.P. (since 31 August 2022)
