= Anthony Johns =

American boxer

Personal information
- Nationality: American
- Born: Newark, New Jersey, U.S.
- Website: https://anthonyjohns.org

Boxing career
- Weight class: Flyweight
Medal record
2019 National Golden Gloves Champion

Anthony Johns is an American boxer from Newark, New Jersey. He was the 2019 National Golden Gloves Champion in the Light flyweight division.

Johns was a New Jersey Golden Gloves Championship four-time winner and New Jersey Diamond Gloves Championship four-time winner. He was inducted into the New Jersey Boxing Hall of Fame. Johns' father, Anthony Williams, is trainer.
