= Luis Aníbal Rodríguez Pardo =

- Archbishop of Santa Cruz de la Sierra
- Church: Catholic Church
- Archdiocese: Archdiocese of Santa Cruz de la Sierra
- In office: 22 May 1958 – 6 February 1991
- Predecessor: Augustin Arce Mostajo
- Successor: Julio Terrazas Sandoval
- Other post: Military Ordinary of Bolivia (1961-1975)
- Previous posts: Titular Bishop of Gergis (1956-1958); Coadjutor Bishop of Cochabamba (1956-1958); Bishop of Oruro (1953-1956); Titular Bishop of Thennesus (1952-1953); Auxiliary Bishop of Santa Cruz de la Sierra (1952-1953)

Orders
- Ordination: 15 May 1938
- Consecration: 5 October 1952 by Sergio Pignedoli

Personal details
- Born: 12 January 1915 Punata, Cochabamba Department, Republic of Bolivia
- Died: 26 March 2004 (aged 89)

Luis Aníbal Rodríguez Pardo (born 12 January 1915 in Punata, died 26 March 2004) was the Roman Catholic Archbishop of Santa Cruz de la Sierra.
