= Scarpellini =

Scarpellini is a surname. Notable people with the surname include:

- Caterina Scarpellini (1808–1873), Italian astronomer and meteorologist
- Elena Scarpellini (born 1987), Italian pole vaulter
- Eugenio Scarpellini (1954–2020), Italian-born Bolivian Roman Catholic bishop
