= Bertocchi (surname) =

Bertocchi is an Italian surname. Notable people with the surname include:

- Angel Gelmi Bertocchi (1938–2016), Italian-born Bolivian Roman Catholic bishop
- Elena Bertocchi (born 1994), Italian diver
- Elio Bertocchi (1919–1971), Italian cyclist
- Francisco Bertocchi (born 1946), Uruguayan footballer and manager
- Guerino Bertocchi (1907–1981), Italian mechanic and racing driver
- Luigi Bertocchi (born 1965), Italian hurdler
- Massimo Bertocchi (born 1985), Canadian decathlete
- Nicolás Bertocchi (born 1989), Argentine professional footballer
