= Andrés Crespo =

Andrés Crespo may refer to:

- Andrés Crespo (fencer)
- Andrés Crespo (actor)
