= Robert Flock =

Robert Flock may refer to:

- Bob Flock (1918–1964), American stock car racer
- Robert Herman Flock (born 1956), American prelate of the Roman Catholic Church
