= Alejandro Crespo =

Alejandro Crespo may refer to:

- Alejandro Crespo (trade unionist)
- Alejandro Crespo (baseball)
