= Robert Herman Flock =

American Catholic prelate (born 1956)

His Excellency Robert Herman Flock
- Bishop of San Ignacio de Velasco in Bolivia
- Diocese: San Ignacio de Velasco
- Appointed: November 11, 2016
- Predecessor: Bishop Carlos Stetter

Orders
- Ordination: July 9, 1982 by Frederick William Freking
- Consecration: January 17, 2013 by Tito Solari Capellari, Sergio Alfredo Gualberti Calandrina and William P. Callahan

Personal details
- Born: Robert Herman Flock; November 4, 1956 Sparta, Wisconsin, United States

Styles of Robert Herman Flock
- Reference style: His Excellency; The Most Reverend
- Spoken style: Your Excellency
- Religious style: Bishop

Robert Herman Flock (born November 4, 1956) is an American prelate of the Roman Catholic Church who serves as bishop of the Roman Catholic Diocese of San Ignacio de Velasco, Bolivia.

== Biography ==
Born in Sparta, Wisconsin, Flock was ordained to the priesthood on July 9, 1982, for the Roman Catholic Diocese of La Crosse, Wisconsin. Flock received theological training from St. Francis de Salles College Seminary, as well as from the Pontifical North American College and the Pontifical Gregorian University in Rome, where he received a degree in Biblical Theology.

Flock arrived in Bolivia in 1988, where he began missionary work and priestly ministry in Santa Cruz. He was appointed Assistant Vicar for the Parish of Santa Cruz, and was responsible for pastoral vocations.

On October 31, 2012, Pope Benedict XVI appointed him to be titular bishop of Forum Popilii, today Forlimpopoli, near Forlì, in Italy, and auxiliary bishop of the Archdiocese of Cochabamba. On November 4, 2016, Pope Francis appointed him as bishop of San Ignacio de Velasco.

Flock was consecrated bishop on January 17, 2013 by Tito Solari Capellari, S.D.B., archbishop of Cochabamba, in the Cathedral of San Sebastián.

Flock has been a long-time critic of former President Morales and the wider Movement for Socialism accusing them of violence, racism, and dividing the country.

Catholic Church titles
| Preceded by – | Auxiliary Bishop of Cochabamba; 2013–Present | Succeeded by – |
