= Diocese of El Alto =

Catholic ecclesiastical territory

Coordinates: 16.5274°S 68.2252°W

Diocese of El Alto Dioecesis Altanus Diócesis de El Alto

Catholic

Location
- Country: Bolivia
- Ecclesiastical province: La Paz
- Metropolitan: La Paz

Statistics
- Area: 23,000 km^{2} (8,900 sq mi)
- Population: Total; Catholics: (as of 2006); 1,220,000; 905,000 (74.2%)
- Parishes: 54

Information
- Denomination: Catholic Church
- Rite: Roman Rite
- Established: 25 June 1994 (32 years ago)
- Cathedral: Catedral Nuestra Señora de la Candelaria

Current leadership
- Pope: Leo XIV
- Bishop: Giovani Edgar Arana
- Metropolitan Archbishop: Edmundo Luis Flavio Abastoflor Montero

Map

Website
- Website of the Diocese

The Roman Catholic Diocese of El Alto (Latin: Dioecesis Altanus) is a diocese located in the city of El Alto in the ecclesiastical province of La Paz in Bolivia.

== History ==
- 25 June 1994: Established as Diocese of El Alto from the Metropolitan Archdiocese of La Paz

== Bishops ==
The list of Bishops of El Alto (Roman rite) and their years of service:

1. Bishop Jesús Juárez Párraga, S.D.B. (1994–2013) appointed, Archbishop of Sucre
2. Bishop Eugenio Scarpellini (2013–2020)
3. Bishop Giovani Edgar Arana (2021–present)

=== Auxiliary bishops ===
- Fernando Bascopé Müller, S.D.B. (2010-2014), appointed Bishop of Bolivia, Military
- Eugenio Scarpellini (2010-2013), appointed Bishop here
- Giovani Edgar Arana (2018-2021), appointed Bishop here
- Pascual Limachi Ortiz (2019-2021), appointed Prelate of Corocoro

== See also ==
- Roman Catholicism in Bolivia
