= Gergis =

Gergis (Greek: Γέργις) may refer to the following:

== Places ==
in Africa

- Gergis, Libya, an ancient city and former bishopric in Libya, now called Zargis and remaining a Latin Catholic titular see as Gergis
- Gergis, Tunisia, an ancient city in Tunisia, now called Zarzis

in Asia

- Gergis (Troad), a place from Antiquity on Mount Ida in the Troad, present-day northwest Anatolia (Turkey)

== People ==
- Gergis, son of Ariazus, a Persian general in Xerxes army
- Joëlle Gergis, climate scientist
