= René Fernández Apaza =

Bolivian Prelate

- Archbishop of the Archdiocese of Cochabamba (emeritus)
- Church: Roman Catholic Church
- See: Roman Catholic Archdiocese of Cochabamba
- In office: 1988 - 1999
- Predecessor: Gennaro Maria Prata Vuolo, S.D.B
- Successor: Tito Solari Capellari, S.D.B.
- Previous post: Prelate

Orders
- Ordination: November 28, 1948

Personal details
- Born: January 9, 1924 Padilla, Bolivia
- Died: August 14, 2013 (aged 89) Cochabamba, Bolivia

René Fernández Apaza (January 9, 1924 – August 14, 2013) was a Bolivian Prelate of the Catholic Church.

== Life ==
René Fernández Apaza was born in Padilla, Bolivia ordained a priest on November 28, 1948. Fernández was appointed bishop to the Diocese of Oruro on March 2, 1968, and consecrated on April 21, 1968. was appointed to the Military Bishopric of Bolivia on July 30, 1975, and would resign on May 17, 1986.

Fernández was appointed Coadjutor Archbishop of the Archdiocese of Sucre November 21, 1981 and succeeds on November 30, 1983.

Fernández' s final appointment came on April 16, 1988, to the Archdiocese of Cochabamba. He took part in the 1997 Synod of Bishops for America.

He retired July 8, 1999, assuming the title "archbishop emeritus". Fernández died of an apparent heart attack in his chapel on August 14, 2013, and was buried at the cathedral.

== See also ==
- Diocese of Oruro
- Military Bishopric of Bolivia
- Archdiocese of Sucre
- Archdiocese of Cochabamba

== External links and additional sources ==
- Cheney, David M. "Archdiocese of Sucre". Catholic-Hierarchy.org. (for Chronology of Bishops)
- Chow, Gabriel. "Metropolitan Archdiocese of Sucre". GCatholic.org. (for Chronology of Bishops)
- Catholic-Hierarchy ^{[self-published]}
- Archdiocese of Cochabamba (Spanish)
