= Naratcata =

Titular see

Naratcata was the seat of an ancient episcopal see of the Roman province of Numidia. The location of the diocese seat and cathedra is not known but presumably was a place called Naratcatensis and was somewhere in today's Algeria.

There are two known bishops of Naratcata:

- Fortunatianus attended the synod meeting in Carthage in 484 by the Vandal king Huneric after which Fortunatianus was later exiled;
- Colombo was among the fathers of another Carthaginian council in 525, celebrated under Hilderic.

The diocese ceased to function with the Muslim conquest of the Maghreb but was re-established in name in 1933. Today Naratcata survives as a titular bishopric and the bishop is Jean-Pierre Kwambamba Masi, of Kinshasa, who replaced Fernando Bascopé Müller in 2014.
