= Fernando Bascopé Müller =

Bolivian Roman Catholic titular bishop (born 1964)

Fernando Bascopé Müller S.D.B.
- Titular Bishop of Fidoloma
- Church: Catholic Church
- Diocese: Diocese of San Ignacio de Velasco
- See: Fidoloma
- Appointed: 29 June 2022
- Predecessor: Luis Albeiro Cortés Rendón
- Other post: Auxiliary Bishop of San Ignacio de Velasco (since 2022)
- Previous posts: Military Ordinary of Bolivia (2014-2022); Titular Bishop of Naratcata (2010-2014); Auxiliary Bishop of El Alto (2010-2014)

Orders
- Ordination: 23 September 1991
- Consecration: 9 September 2010 by Jesús Juárez Párraga

Personal details
- Born: 4 April 1962 (age 63) Santa Cruz de la Sierra, Republic of Bolivia

Fernando Bascopé Müller (born 4 April 1962) is a Bolivian Roman Catholic titular bishop.

Müller was born in Bolivia and was ordained to the priesthood in 1991. He served as titular bishop of Naratcata and as auxiliary bishop of the Roman Catholic Diocese of El Alto from 2010 to 2014. He has served as bishop of Military Ordinariate of Bolivia since 2014.
