= Gonzalo Ramiro del Castillo Crespo =

Bolivian Roman Catholic bishop (1936–2019)

Gonzalo Ramiro del Castillo Crespo OCD
- Bishop Emeritus of the Military Ordinariate of Bolivia
- Church: Catholic Church
- In office: 14 April 2000 – 4 April 2012
- Predecessor: Mario Lezana Vaca
- Successor: Oscar Omar Aparicio Céspedes
- Previous posts: Titular Bishop of Themisonium (1983-2000); Auxiliary Bishop of La Paz (1983-2000)

Orders
- Ordination: 21 September 1964
- Consecration: 7 January 1984 by Jorge Manrique Hurtado

Personal details
- Born: Gonzalo Ramiro de Jesús María del Castillo Crespo; 20 September 1936 La Paz, Bolivia
- Died: 14 January 2019 (aged 82) Cochabamba, Cochabamba Department, Bolivia

Gonzalo Ramiro de Jesús María del Castillo Crespo (20 September 1936 – 14 January 2019) was a Bolivian Roman Catholic bishop.

== Early life ==
Del Castillo Crespo was born in Bolivia and was ordained to the priesthood in 1964. He served as titular bishop of Themisonium and as auxiliary bishop of the Roman Catholic Archdiocese of La Paz, Bolivia, from 1983 to 2000 and as bishop of the Military Ordinariate of Bolivia from 2000 to 2012.
