= Yosuán Crespo =

Cuban businessman and computer scientist

Yosuan Crespo
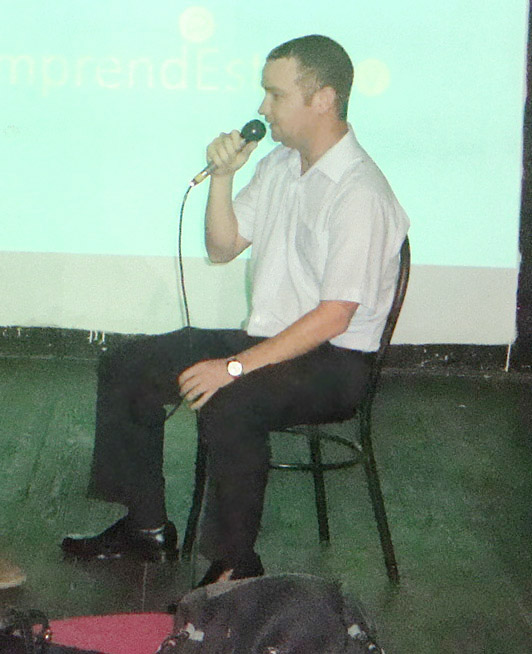
- Yosuan Crespo speaking at an interview. May 30, 2015.
- Born: Yosuan Crespo Garcia; November 24, 1984 (age 41); Havana City, Cuba
- Occupations: Computer scientist, businessman
- Website: yosuancrespo.com

Yosuan Crespo (born November 24, 1984, in Havana, Cuba) is a Cuban businessman and computer scientist. Crespo cofounded EspacioCuba, one of the first Cuban real estate offices after the buying and selling of properties was authorized in November 2011. He has developed several software to manage Medical Genetics information.

== Early life and education ==
Crespo was born in Havana, son of Marta García, accountant and Juan Francisco Crespo, Mechanical Engineer.

Crespo's passion for computing began when he had his first personal computer while studying in high school, it was a gift from his grandfather Arístides who also inspired him to study English language from an early age. He attended V. I. Lenin Exact Sciences Vocational Institute in Havana where earned a Bachelor degree in 2002. Later on he graduated with honors in Computer Sciences Engineering at the University of Information Science in 2008.

To carry out his university dissertation, Crespo developed the website for the Cuban Registry of Mentally Challenged Patients which contained the genetic characteristics of those people, allowing geneticists to manage information and visualize different reports to raise the quality of life and well-being of such patients.

== Beginning of labor life ==
Before finishing university Crespo participated in the development team of the Medical Genetics Computer System, a computer application that allows managing all the information associated with a medical genetics consultation and the studies this branch carries out. After graduating he ended up being the leader of that software development project.

He also participated in the computer processing of data collected in the clinical-genetic, psycho-pedagogical and social study of people with disability in the Republic of Ecuador.

Together with his work in software development, Yosuan was an English professor at the University of Computer Sciences.

== Businesses ==
Crespo cofounded EspacioCuba in 2012, a real estate office and real estate portal, after the Cuban government authorized the buying and selling of properties in Cuba in November 2011 which opened an emergent real estate market. At the beginning he had to use computer programmer and photographer licenses to take pictures of the properties for sale and listing them in the real estate portal because real estate agents weren't authorized in the island at that moment.

Afterwards, in September 2013, the licenses to exercise as real estate agents were authorized and from that moment on this business became one of the first real estate agencies in Cuba.
