= María Isabel Crespo de Lebed =

Ecuadorian journalist and news presenter

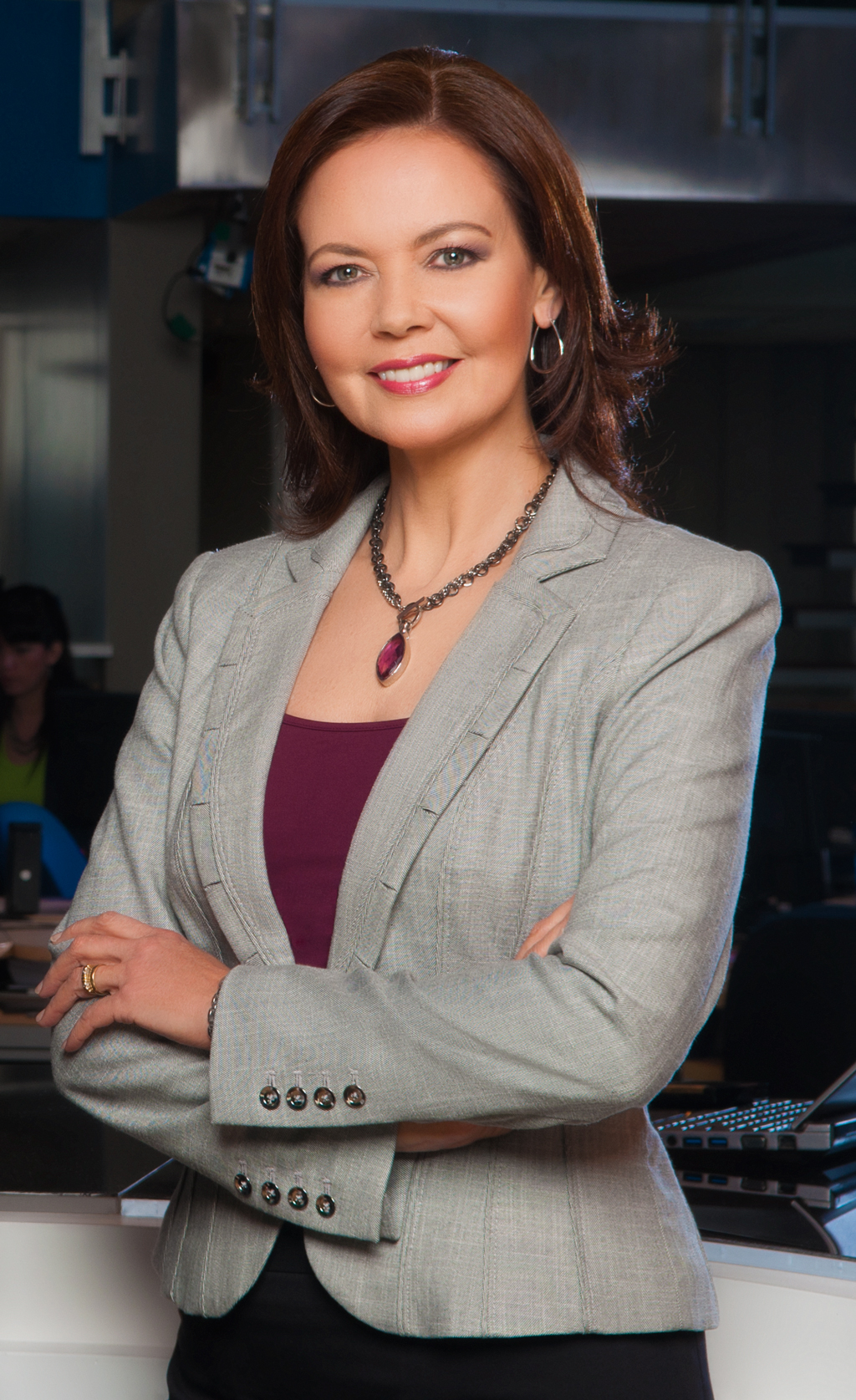
- Born: 11 July 1960 (age 65); Cuenca, Ecuador
- Occupations: Journalist, reporter
- Years active: 1980–present
- Spouse: Danny Lebed

María Isabel Crespo de Lebed (born 11 July 1960) is an Ecuadorian journalist, reporter, and news presenter.

== Biography ==
María Isabel Crespo was born on 11 July 1960 in Cuenca, Ecuador at the age of ten, her family moved to Guayaquil, where Crespo studied at the Asunción and Liceo Panamericano schools. She picked up the yoga discipline and met Danny Lebed, who she later married.

Crespo studied at the Faculty of Social Communication (FASCO) of the University of Guayaquil and, at age 18 and while still attending school, was hired by Ecuavisa as a noontime newscaster and reporter after passing a test held by Alfonso Espinosa de los Monteros at the request of production manager Nila Velázquez. After fourteen years in journalism, she retired in 1994 to become a housewife, but returned to Ecuavisa three years later as an editor in chief, researcher, and executive producer.

In 2012, she wrote a series of 12 special reports entitled El Sueño Olímpico, Londres 2012, documenting in depth the normal lives of the athletes representing Ecuador at the 2012 London Summer Olympics. Her story on Alexandra Escobar in particular would win Crespo International Film and Sports Television Festival Prize in July 2012.
