= Crespo Municipality =

Crespo Municipality Municipio Crespo
- Municipality
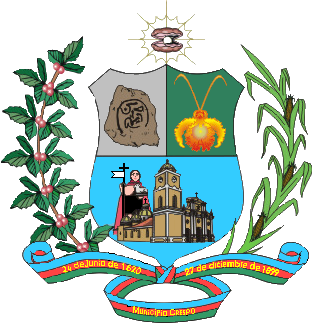
- Flag Coat of arms

- Location in Lara

- Location in Venezuela
- Coordinates: 10°19′08″N 69°09′30″W
- Country: Venezuela
- State: Lara

Government
  - Mayor: Julio Garcés (PSUV)

Area
  - Total: 759.2 km^{2} (293.1 sq mi)

Population (2011)
  - Total: 49,958
  - Density: 65.80/km^{2} (170.4/sq mi)
- Time zone: UTC−4 (VET)
- Area code(s): 0253
- Website: Official website

The Crespo Municipality is one of the nine municipalities (municipios) that makes up the Venezuelan state of Lara and, as of the 2011 census, the municipality has a population of 49,958. The town of Duaca is the shire town of the Crespo Municipality.

== Demographics ==
The Crespo Municipality, according to a 2011 population census by the National Institute of Statistics of Venezuela, has a population of 49,958 (up from 42,432 in 2001). This amounts to 2.8% of the state's population. The municipality's population density is 56.93 inhabitants per square kilometre (147.4/sq mi).

== Government ==
The mayor of the Crespo Municipality is Miguel Valecillos Paul, re-elected on October 31, 2004, with 83% of the vote. The municipality is divided into two parishes; Fréitez and José María Blanco.

== See also ==
- Duaca
- Lara
- Municipalities of Venezuela
