= Julio Crespo MacLennan =

Spanish academic, historian and author

Julio Crespo MacLennan is a Spanish academic, historian and published author. He holds a senior fellowship at the Cañada Blanch Centre for Contemporary Spanish Studies in the London School of Economics.

== Education ==
Julio Crespo MacLennan was born in Madrid on 17 May 1970. He is the son of renowned lawyer and journalist Pedro Crespo de Lara, who held the vice presidency to the World Press Freedom Committee for 4 terms. He studied modern history at University College, Oxford. He initiated postgraduate studies in Paris followed by the Ortega y Gasset Research Institute in Madrid, where he took an MA In International Relations, and finished at St Antony's College, Oxford, where he presented his D. Phil thesis on Spain and the process of European integration.

== Academic and professional career ==
He has taught history and international relations at several universities in Britain, Spain and the United States. He has been a Santander Fellow in Iberian and European Studies at St Antony's College, Oxford, Visiting Professor at the Prince of Asturias Chair in Tufts University, Massachusetts, and Associate Professor at IE University and IE Business School. Throughout his academic career, he has lectured in over twenty countries in Europe, America and the Middle East.

For a time he worked in cultural diplomacy representing the Spanish diplomatic mission as director of the Instituto Cervantes in Istanbul, Dublin, and London. In his latter post, in 2016, Crespo MacLennan was in charge of the cultural programme that marked the 400th anniversary of the deaths of Shakespeare and Cervantes. Also in London, he conducted a series of conversations with eminent Hispanists in the English-speaking world.

He first specialized in Spanish modern history as a member of the Oxford School of Historians founded by Raymond Carr. Later, his work veered towards contemporary Europe and European integration history. His main research interests lie in modern European history and the legacy of Europe in the global world, including a pioneering pan-European history, beyond artificial barriers of nation-states and national rivalries, presented at the Instituto Cervantes in London in February 2019.

== Publications ==
Crespo MacLennan has published six books, including Spain and the process of European integration, 1957-1985 in 1999, Imperios, auge y declive de Europa en el mundo 1492-2015 in 2012, and his latest and most ambitious work, Europa: how Europe shaped the modern world in 2018. He has also published over one hundred book reviews and articles in academic journals and the daily press, mainly in the Spanish daily newspapers ABC and El Pais.

Full list of publications:

- Spain and the process of European integration, 1957–85, Palgrave 1999, ISBN 0-333-92886-5
- España en Europa, del ostracismo a la modernidad, Marcial Pons, 2004, ISBN 84-95379-67-8
- (co-editor) Spain and Ireland through the ages, Four Courts Press, 2006, ISBN 978-1-85182-991-0
- Forjadores de Europa, grandes europeístas y euroescépticos del siglo XX, Destino, 2009, ISBN 978-84-233-4118-4
- Imperios, auge y declive de Europa en el mundo, 1492-2012, Galaxia Gutenberg, 2012, ISBN 978-84-15-47209-4
- Europa: how Europe shaped the modern world, Pegasus books, 2018, ISBN 978-1-68177-756-6
