= Eugenio Scarpellini =

Italian priest (1954–2020)

- Bishop of El Alto
- Church: Catholic Church
- Diocese: Diocese of El Alto
- In office: 25 July 2013 – 15 July 2020
- Predecessor: Jesús Juárez Párraga
- Successor: Giovani Edgar Arana
- Previous posts: Titular Bishop of Bida (2010-2013); Auxiliary Bishop of El Alto (2010-2013)

Orders
- Ordination: 17 June 1978
- Consecration: 9 September 2010 by Jesús Juárez Párraga

Personal details
- Born: 8 January 1954 Verdellino, Province of Bergamo, Italy
- Died: 15 July 2020 (aged 66) El Alto, La Paz Department, Bolivia

Eugenio Scarpellini (8 January 1954 – 15 July 2020) was an Italian-born Bolivian Roman Catholic bishop.

== Biography ==
Scarpellini was born in Italy and was ordained to the priesthood in 1974. He served as titular bishop of Bida and as auxiliary bishop of the Roman Catholic Diocese of El Alto, Bolivia from 2010 to 2013. He then served as bishop of the El Alto Diocese from 2013 until his death in 2020, when he died after contracting COVID-19 amidst the COVID-19 pandemic in Bolivia.
