= José Crespo =

José Crespo may refer to:

- José Crespo (rower) (born 1962), Spanish lightweight rower
- José Álvarez Crespo (born 1945), Mexican footballer
- José Ángel Crespo (born 1987), Spanish footballer
- José Antonio Crespo (born 1977), Spanish badminton player
- José Crespo (actor) (1900–1997), Spanish film actor
- José Manuel Crespo (born 1972), Spanish sprint canoer
- José Manuel Colmenero Crespo (born 1973), Spanish footballer
