= Crespos =

- municipality
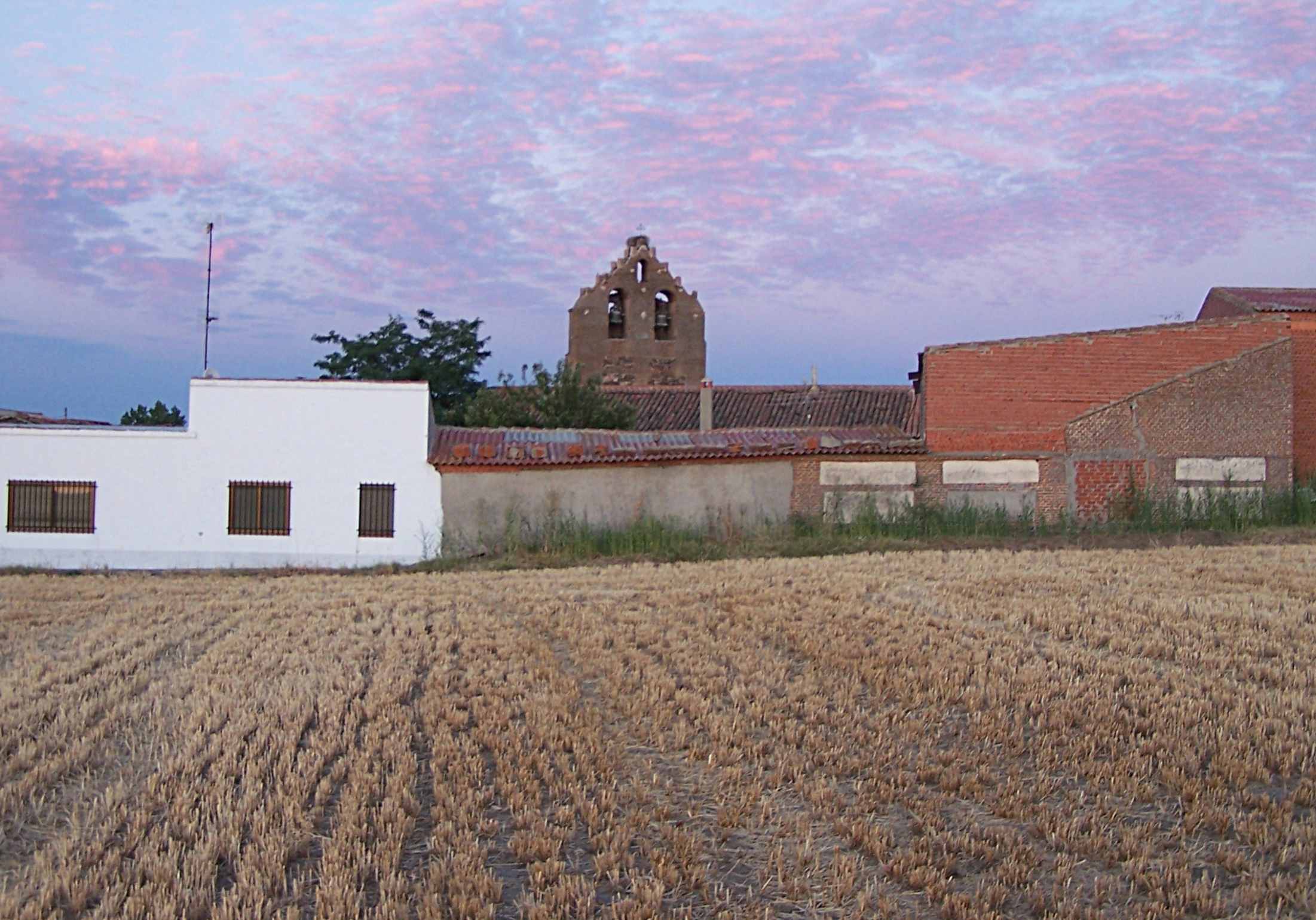
- Tower of the church of Pacualgrande, Crespos

- Flag Coat of arms

- Location in Spain. Crespos (Spain)
- Coordinates: 40°52′15″N 4°58′13″W
- Country: Spain
- Autonomous community: Castile and León
- Province: Ávila
- Municipality: Crespos

Area
  - Total: 31.92 km^{2} (12.32 sq mi)
- Elevation: 912 m (2,992 ft)

Population (2025-01-01)
  - Total: 463
  - Density: 14.5/km^{2} (37.6/sq mi)
- Time zone: UTC+1 (CET)
  - Summer (DST): UTC+2 (CEST)
- Website: Official website

Crespos is a municipality located in the province of Ávila, Castile and León, Spain.

== Population ==
Historical population
Year	Pop.	±% p.a.
2023	465	—
2024	482	+3.66%
2025	463	−3.94%
Source: INE
