= Diocese of Oruro =

Catholic ecclesiastical territory

Diocese of Oruro Dioecesis Orurensis Diócesis de Oruro

Catholic

Location
- Country: Bolivia
- Ecclesiastical province: Cochabamba
- Metropolitan: Cochabamba

Statistics
- Area: 53,588 km^{2} (20,690 sq mi)
- Population: Total; Catholics: (as of 2004); 403,521; 342,993 (85%)
- Parishes: 37

Information
- Denomination: Roman Catholic
- Rite: Roman Rite
- Established: 11 November 1924 (101 years ago)
- Cathedral: Cathedral of the Assumption in Oruro

Current leadership
- Pope: Leo XIV
- Bishop: Krzysztof Bialasik Wawrowska, SVD
- Metropolitan Archbishop: Oscar Omar Aparicio Céspedes

Map

Website
- www.diocesisdeoruro.org

The Roman Catholic Diocese of Oruro (Latin: Dioecesis Orurensis) is a diocese located in the city of Oruro in the ecclesiastical province of Cochabamba in Bolivia.

== History ==
- November 11, 1924: Established as Diocese of Oruro from the Metropolitan Archdiocese of La Plata

== Bishops ==
=== Ordinaries (listed in reverse chronological order) ===
- Bishops of Oruro (Roman rite)
  - Bishop Krzysztof Bialasik Wawrowska (2005.06.30 – present)
  - Bishop Braulio Sáez Garcia, OCD (1991.11.07 – 2003.09.11)
  - Bishop Julio Terrazas Sandoval, CSsR (1982.01.09 – 1991.02.06), appointed Archbishop of Santa Cruz de la Sierra; future Cardinal
  - Bishop René Fernández Apaza (1968.03.02 – 1981.11.21), appointed Coadjutor Archbishop of Sucre
  - Bishop Jorge Manrique Hurtado (1956.07.28 – 1967.07.27), appointed Archbishop of La Paz
  - Bishop Luis Aníbal Rodríguez Pardo (1953.06.17 – 1956.07.28), appointed Coadjutor Bishop of Cochabamba; future Archbishop
  - Bishop Bertoldo Bühl, OFM (1951.10.26 – 1953.06.17)
  - Bishop Riccardo Chavez Alcazar (1938.01.27 – 1949.09.30)
  - Bishop Abel Isidoro Antezana y Rojas, CMF (1924.11.13 – 1938.01.16), appointed Bishop of La Paz; future Archbishop

=== Auxiliary bishop ===
- Braulio Sáez Garcia, OCD (1987-1991), appointed Bishop here

== See also ==
- Roman Catholicism in Bolivia
