= Archdiocese of Cochabamba =

Catholic ecclesiastical territory

Coordinates: 17.3944°S 66.1568°W

Archdiocese of Cochabamba Archidioecesis Cochabambensis Arquidiócesis de Cochabamba

Catholic
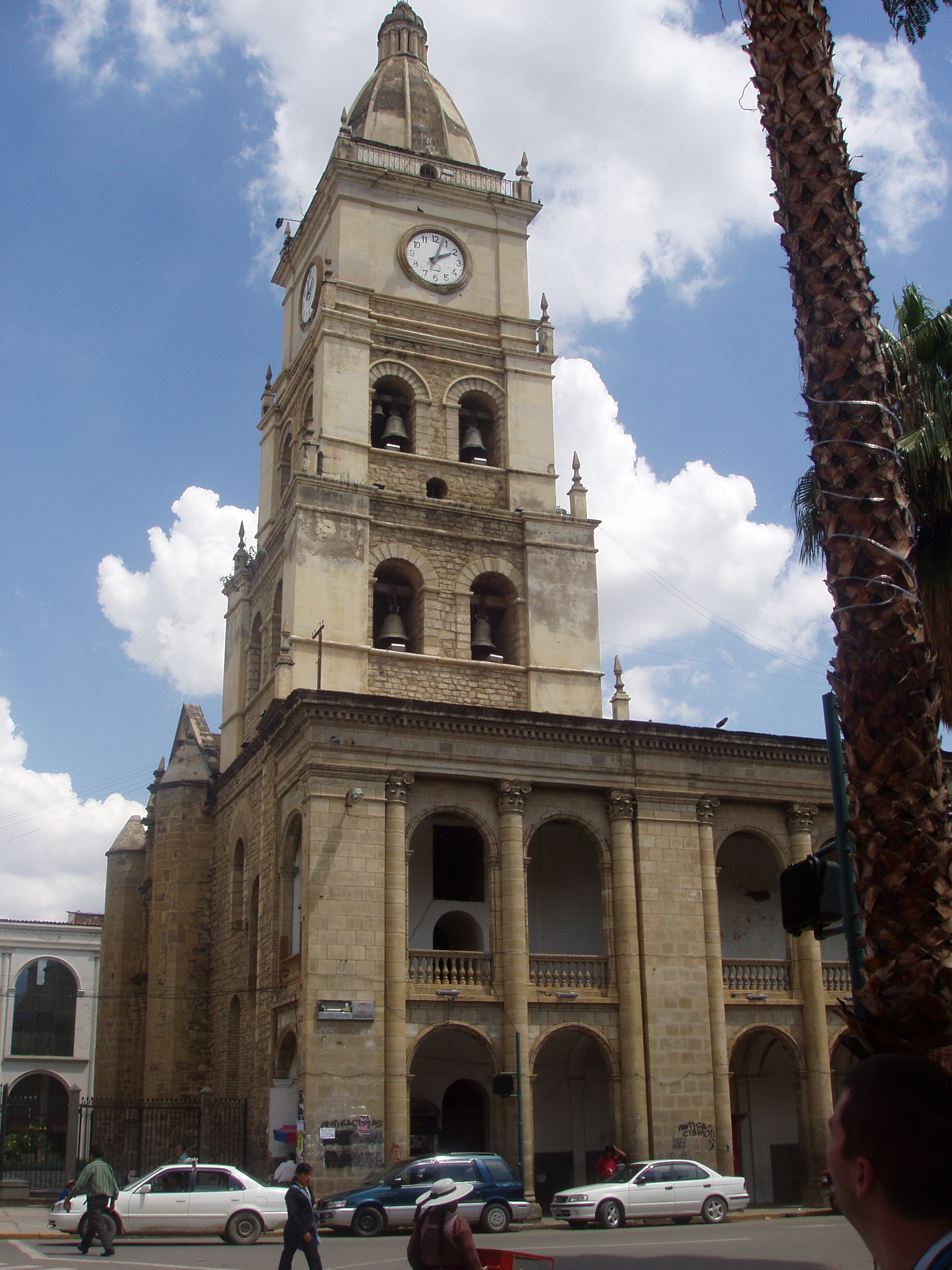
- Metropolitan Cathedral of Saint Sebastian

Location
- Country: Bolivia
- Ecclesiastical province: Cochabamba

Statistics
- Area: 32,306 km^{2} (12,473 sq mi)
- Population: Total; Catholics: (as of 2006); 1,524,000; 1,390,300 (91.2%)
- Parishes: 73

Information
- Denomination: Roman Catholic
- Rite: Roman Rite
- Established: 25 June 1847 (179 years ago)
- Cathedral: Cathedral of St Sebastian

Current leadership
- Pope: Leo XIV
- Metropolitan Archbishop: Oscar Omar Aparicio Céspedes
- Auxiliary Bishops: Víctor Iván Vargas Galarza; Juan Gómez
- Bishops emeritus: Tito Solari CapellariArchbishop Emeritus

Map

Website
- www.iglesiacbba.org

The Roman Catholic Archdiocese of Cochabamaba (Latin: Archidioecesis Cochabambensis) is an archdiocese located in the city of Cochabamba in Bolivia.

== History ==
Construction of the original Church of San Sebastian began in 1571. At that time, the area was part of the vast Diocese of Cusco.

On June 25, 1847 Pope Pius IX erected the Diocese of Cochabamaba from the Metropolitan Archdiocese of La Plata and Diocese of Santa Cruz de la Sierra. It was established as a suggragen of La Plata. On July 30, 1975 the diocese was promoted to the Metropolitan Archdiocese of Cochabamba.

== Present day ==
In 2011, the Episcopal Conference of Bolivia organized a conference in Cochabamaba on the theme "the Church and public opinion in the digital age." Archbishop Aparicio is secretary-general of the bishops' conference.

The Pan y Amor program of the Archdiocese of St. Louis supports the Salomon Klein Children's Home in Cochabamba.

The church of St. Pius X in Cochabamaba serves a Maryknoll mission made up of a number of local Christian communities or assemblies.

== Bishops ==
=== Ordinaries (listed in reverse chronological order) ===
- Archbishops of Cochabamaba (Roman rite)
  - Archbishop Oscar Omar Aparicio Céspedes (2014.09.24 - ...
  - Archbishop Tito Solari Capellari (1999.07.08 – 2014.09.24)
  - Archbishop René Fernández Apaza (1988.04.16 – 1999.07.08)
  - Archbishop Gennaro Maria Prata Vuolo (1981.11.21 – 1987.09.19)
  - Archbishop José Armando Gutiérrez Granier (1975.07.30 – 1980.07.21)
- Bishops of Cochabamaba (Roman rite)
  - Archbishop José Armando Gutiérrez Granier (1965.08.19 – 1975.07.30)
  - Bishop Juan Tarsicio Senner (1951.10.26 – 1965.08.19)
  - Bishop Bertoldo Bühl (Apostolic Administrator 1943 – 1951.10.26)
  - Bishop Tomás Aspe (1931.06.08 – 1942.11.21)
  - Bishop Julio Garret (1924.11.13 – 1929.12.28), appointed Bishop of Oruro
  - Bishop Luigi Francesco Pierini (1918.02.20 – 1923.10.31), appointed Archbishop of La Plata o Charcas
  - Bishop Giacinto Anaya (1897.08.18 – 1915.12.17)
  - Bishop Francesco Maria Granado (1871.08.25 - 1885.09.25)
  - Bishop Rafael Salinas (1857.13.19 - 1871.03.19)
  - Bishop José María Yáñez de Montenegro (1848.04.14 - 1854.11.24)

=== Coadjutor bishops ===
- Francesco Maria Granado (1870-1871)
- Luis Aníbal Rodríguez Pardo (1956-1958), did not succeed to see; appointed Bishop of Santa Cruz de la Sierra
- Tito Solari Capellari (1998-1999)

=== Auxiliary bishops ===
- Francesco Maria Granado (1868-1870), appointed Coadjutor here
- Abel Costas Montaño (1968-1974) appointed Bishop of Tarija
- Luis Sáinz Hinojosa (1982-1987), appointed Archbishop of La Paz; as Archbishop (Personal Title), was Auxiliary Bishop here again, 2001-2012
- Angel Gelmi Bertocchi (1985-2013)
- Manuel Revollo Crespo (1985-1993), appointed Coadjutor Bishop of Bolivia, Military
- Robert Herman Flock Bever (2012-2016), appointed Bishop of San Ignacio de Velasco
- Carlos Enrique Curiel Herrera (2018-)
- Juan Gómez (2018-)

== Suffragan dioceses ==
- Diocese of Oruro
- Territorial Prelature of Aiquile

== See also ==
- Roman Catholicism in Bolivia
