= List of U.S. national Golden Gloves light flyweight champions =

This is a list of United States national Golden Gloves champions in the light flyweight division, along with the state or region they represented. The weight limit for light flyweights was first contested at 106 lb (48 kg), but was increased to 108 lb (49 kg) in 2010.

- 1975: Claudel Atkins – St. Louis, Missouri
- 1976: Louis Curtis – Washington, D.C.
- 1977: Not contested
- 1978: Richard Sandoval – Las Vegas, Nevada
- 1979: Mike Monette - Saint Paul Minnesota
- 1980: Steven McCrory – Detroit, Michigan
- 1981: Jesse Benavides – Fort Worth, Texas
- 1982: Jose Rosario – Elizabeth, Pennsylvania
- 1983: Johnny Tapia – New Mexico
- 1984: Israel Acosta – Milwaukee, Wisconsin
- 1985: Arthur Johnson – St. Louis, Missouri
- 1986: Michael Carbajal – Las Vegas, Nevada
- 1987: Eric Griffin – Louisiana
- 1988: Mark Johnson – Washington, D.C.
- 1989: Eric Griffin – Fort Worth, Texas
- 1990: Russell Roberts – Louisiana
- 1991: Dan Davis – Pennsylvania
- 1992: James Harris – Washington, D.C.
- 1993: Floyd Mayweather Jr. – Michigan
- 1994: Eric Morel – Milwaukee
- 1995: Juaquin Gallardo – Southern California
- 1996: Gerald Tucker – Cincinnati, Ohio
- 1997: Sergio Espinosa – Southern California
- 1998: Bradley Martinez – Colorado
- 1999: Carlo Pizarro – Massachusetts
- 2000: Ronald Siler – Cincinnati
- 2001: Aaron Alafa – California
- 2002: Raytona Whitfield – Knoxville, Tennessee
- 2003: Austroberto Juarez – California
- 2004: Israel Crespo – Pennsylvania
- 2005: Roberto Ceron – Knoxville, Tennessee
- 2006: Luis Yáñez – Texas
- 2007: Luis Yáñez – Texas
- 2008: Louie Byrd – Colorado/New Mexico
- 2009: Miguel Cartagena – Pennsylvania
- 2010: Louie Byrd – Colorado/New Mexico
- 2011: Santos Vasquez – Nevada
- 2012: Leroy Davila – New Jersey
- 2013 – Nico Hernandez – Kansas
- 2014 – Christian Carto – Philadelphia
- 2015 - Pablo Ramirez - Texas
- 2016 - Pablo Ramirez - Texas
- 2017 - Angel Martinez - Rockford, Illinois
- 2019 - Angel Herrera - Aurora, Illinois
