= Yadira Serrano Crespo =

Mexican politician

- Born: 18 April 1976 (age 50); Cocula, Guerrero, Mexico
- Occupation: Politician
- Political party: PRD

Yadira Serrano Crespo (born 18 April 1976) is a Mexican politician affiliated with the Party of the Democratic Revolution. As of 2014 she served as Deputy of the LIX Legislature of the Mexican Congress as a plurinominal representative.
