= Metropolitan Cathedral of Saint Sebastian =

Cathedral of San Sebastián
- Catedral de San Sebastián en Cochabamba
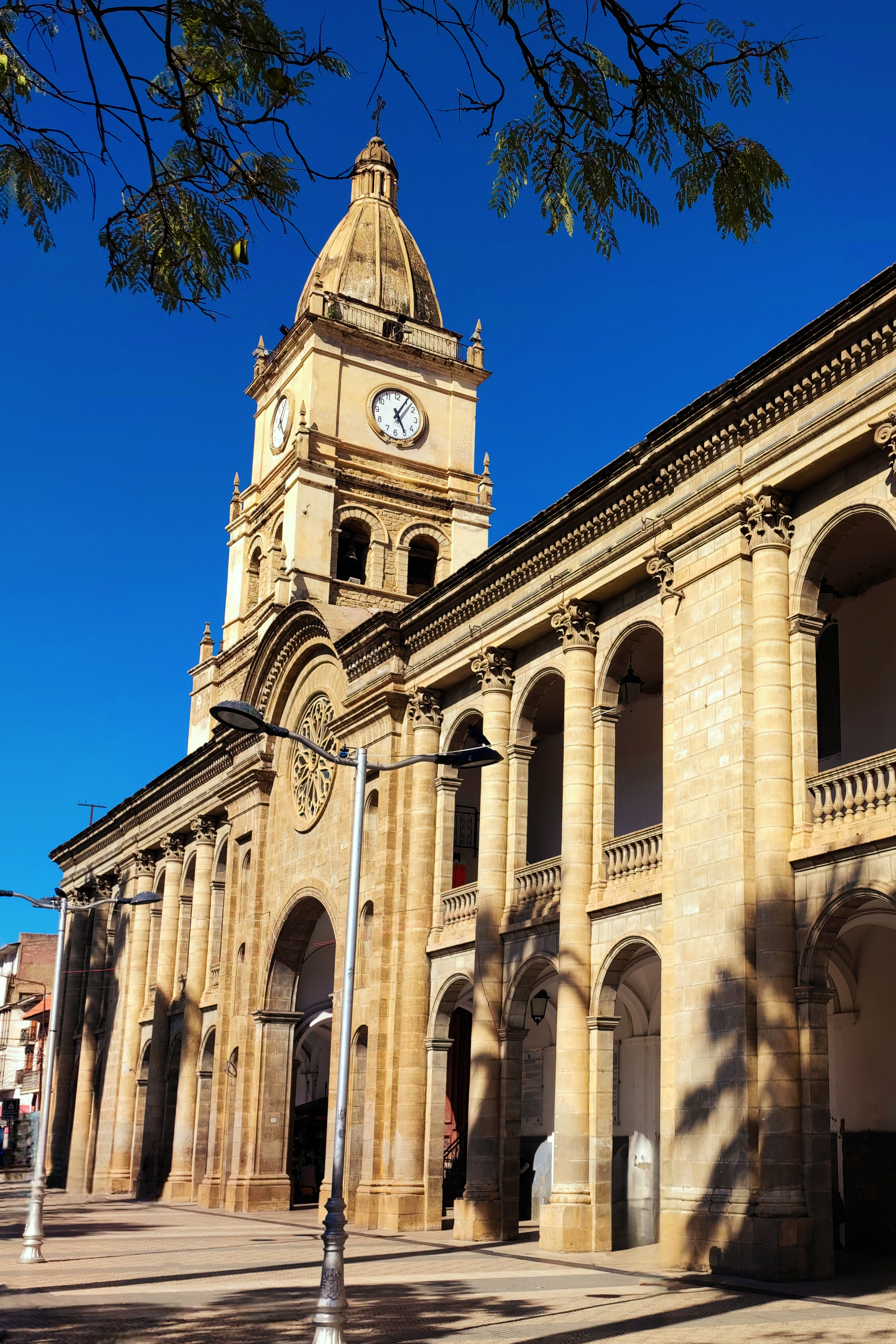
- The Cathedral as seen from the Plaza 14 de Septiembre
- Cathedral of San Sebastián
- 17°23′40.32″S 66°9′25.7″W
- Location: Cochabamba
- Country: Bolivia
- Denomination: Roman Catholic

History
- Founded: 1571

Administration
- Archdiocese: Archdiocese of Cochabamba

Clergy
- Archbishop: Archbishop Tito Solari Capellari, S.D.B.

The Metropolitan Cathedral of Saint Sebastian (Spanish: Catedral Metropolitana San Sebastián) is the cathedral of the Roman Catholic Church in the Archdiocese of Cochabamba. It is located in the Plaza 14 de Septiembre in Cochabamba, Bolivia.

== History ==
The original structure was begun in 1571, atop the foundations of the 14th century Villa de Oropeza, making it the oldest structure in the valley. In 1618, the church administrators agreed to build a bigger church, both to renovate the deteriorating building and to accommodate the increasing populace. The current building was built in 1701 atop the foundation of the previous one. Construction was completed in 1735.

In September 2012, the cathedral was declared a National Heritage Site by the Senate of Bolivia.

== Architecture ==
The cathedral's facade is a fusion of Spanish baroque and indigenous Bolivian styles. It has a Renaissance Latin Cross style groundplan. The structure itself is built of stone and adobe masonry, with the domes and vaults made with brick and lime mortar, ornamented with ceramic tiling.
