= Israel Crespo =

Puerto Rican boxer

Israel Omar Crespo (12 February 1986 – 15 September 2007) was a Puerto Rican professional boxer. He was born in Arecibo, Puerto Rico.

== Amateur career ==
Known as "Chiki", Crespo had an outstanding amateur career, and was the National Golden Gloves Light Flyweight Champion in 2004.

== Professional career ==
Crespo turned professional in 2005, fighting out of Lancaster, Pennsylvania and won his first two bouts before losing to Carlos Tamara in 2006.

== Death ==
Crespo was shot and killed by bullets fired from a moving car while horseback riding with friends outside Ponce, Puerto Rico.

== See also ==
- List of Puerto Ricans
