= Angel Gelmi Bertocchi =

Italian-born Bolivian Roman Catholic bishop

Angel Gelmi Bertocchi (24 April 1938 – 17 June 2016) was an Italian-born Bolivian Roman Catholic bishop.

Ordained to the priesthood in 1968, Gelmi Bertocchi served as the auxiliary bishop of the Roman Catholic Archdiocese of Cochabamba, Bolivia, from 1985 to 2013.
