= Andrea Crespo (writer) =

Ecuadorian writer (born 1983)

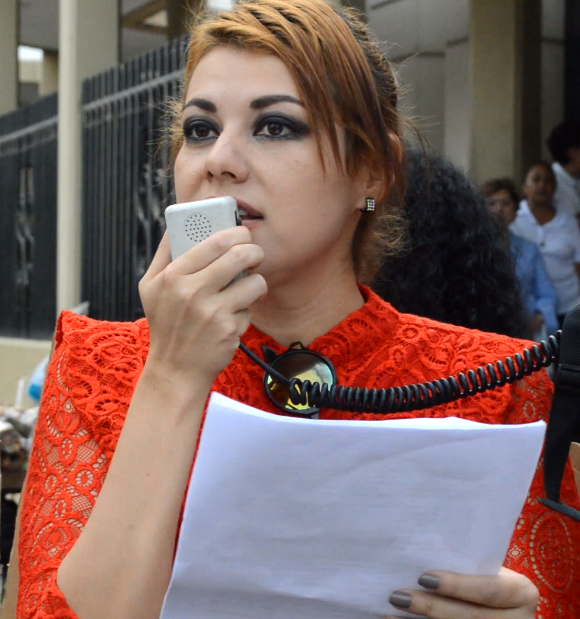
- Born: Andrea Priscila Crespo Granda; 4 October 1983 (age 42); Guayaquil
- Education: University of Casa Grande
- Occupations: Writer, poet
- Awards: Aurelio Espinosa Pólit prize (2016)

Andrea Priscila Crespo Granda (born 4 October 1983) is an Ecuadorian writer.

== Biography ==
Andrea Crespo was born on 4 October 1983 in Guayaquil, Ecuador. She completed a degree in creative writing at the University of Casa Grande.

In September 2013, Crespo published her first work L.A. Monstruo through Editorial Cadáver Exquisito. In the book, which uses the structure of the Pentateuch, Crespo addresses femininity, masculinity, and power in politics through the life of her main character.

In October 2016, Crespo received the Aurelio Espinosa Pólit prize from the Catholic University of Ecuador, who selected Registro de la habitada from 166 other works. In December of that year, the selling of Crespo's poems began at the Casa Morada in Guayaquil.

Her next book, Libro Hémbrico, won the House of Ecuadorian Culture's David Ledesma Vásquez National Poetry Contest in March 2017. The contents of the book focuses on topics such as body acceptance and femininity.

Crespo ran unsuccessfully in the 2013 Ecuadorian legislative election to win a seat in the Ecuadorian National Assembly.

== Works ==
- L.A. Monstruo (2013)
- Registro de la habitada (2016)
- Libro Hémbrico (2019)
