= Alejandro Crespo (trade unionist) =

Argentine trade unionist

Alejandro Crespo is an Argentine trade unionist.

In April 2016 he was elected as the general secretary of SUTNA, the tire workers' union, an affiliate of the Argentine Workers' Central Union (CTA). He was elected as the candidate of the red-black-granate list.

He is a member of the Workers' Party (Argentina).
