= Andrés Crespo (fencer) =

Spanish fencer

Personal information
- Born: 5 April 1968 (age 58) Burgos, Spain

Sport
- Sport: Fencing

Andrés Crespo (born 5 April 1968) is a Spanish fencer. He competed in the team foil event at the 1992 Summer Olympics.
