= Andrea Crespo (artist) =

American artist based in New York city

- Born: 1993 (age 32–33)

Andrea Crespo (born 1993, Miami) is an American artist based in New York City. They earned their BFA from Pratt Institute in 2015. Their solo exhibition, Andrea Crespo: virocrypsis, at the Swiss Institute of Contemporary Art was featured in the February 2016 issue of Artforum.

== Career ==
Crespo explores the complex cultural and historical narratives that surround the misconceptions of the psychological and bodily being. Identity or identity errors encompassed his practice, although they have also focused on the interconnectedness of psychopathological realities, cultural formations, and the digital communities associated with them.

Crespo self-identifies as a dicephalophilic (an affinity for) transgender person with Aspergers.

Their work is included in the Rubell Family Collection, the Fondation Louis-Vuitton and in the Zabludowicz Collection.

== Solo exhibitions ==
2019 Step Right Up, Kraupa-Tuskany Zeidler, Berlin

2017 [intensifies], Kraupa-Tuskany Zeidler, Berlin

2017 Joined for Life, Downs & Ross, New York

2017 List Projects: Andrea Crespo, MIT List Visual Arts Center, Cambridge, MA

2016 A day in the lives of, New Museum/Rhizome (online), New York
