= Manuel Revollo Crespo =

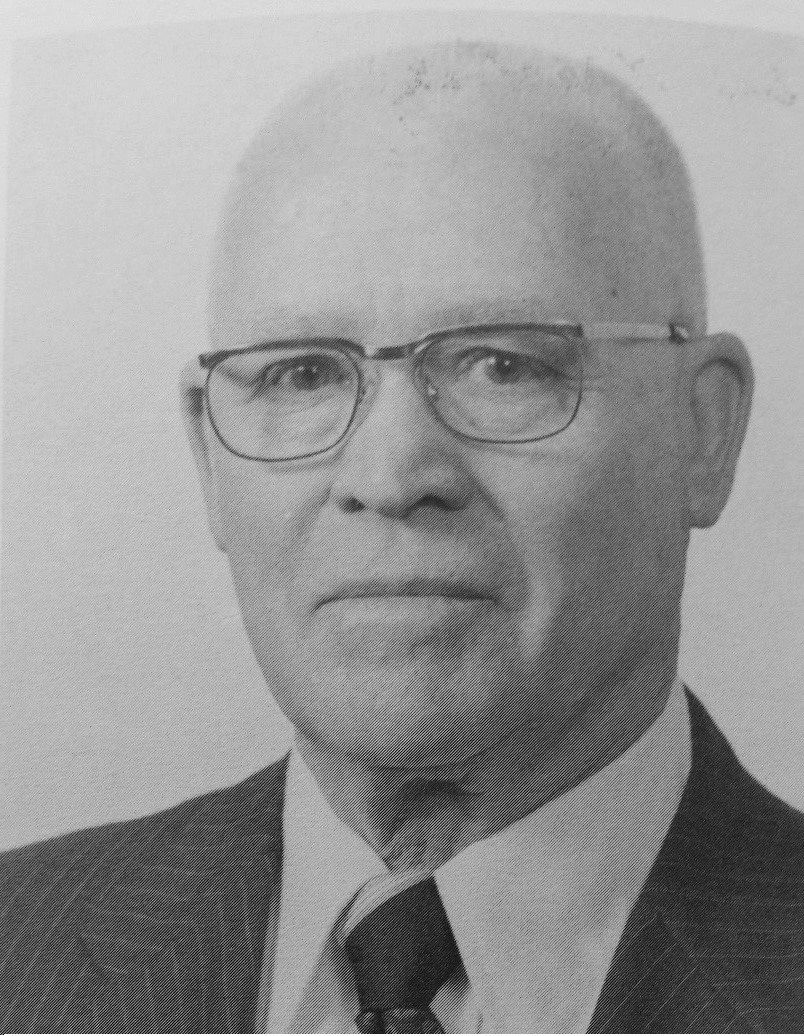
Manuel Crespo

Manuel Revollo Crespo (June 17, 1925 – October 26, 2014) was a Roman Catholic bishop.

Ordained to the priesthood in 1952, Revollo Crespo was named titular bishop of Casae in Numinda and auxiliary bishop of the Roman Catholic Archdiocese of Cochabamba, Bolivia in 1985. In 1993, he was appointed coadjutor bishop of the Bolivia Military Ordinariate and resigned in 2000.
