= María Quintana (scientist) =

Peruvian engineer

Maria Quintana
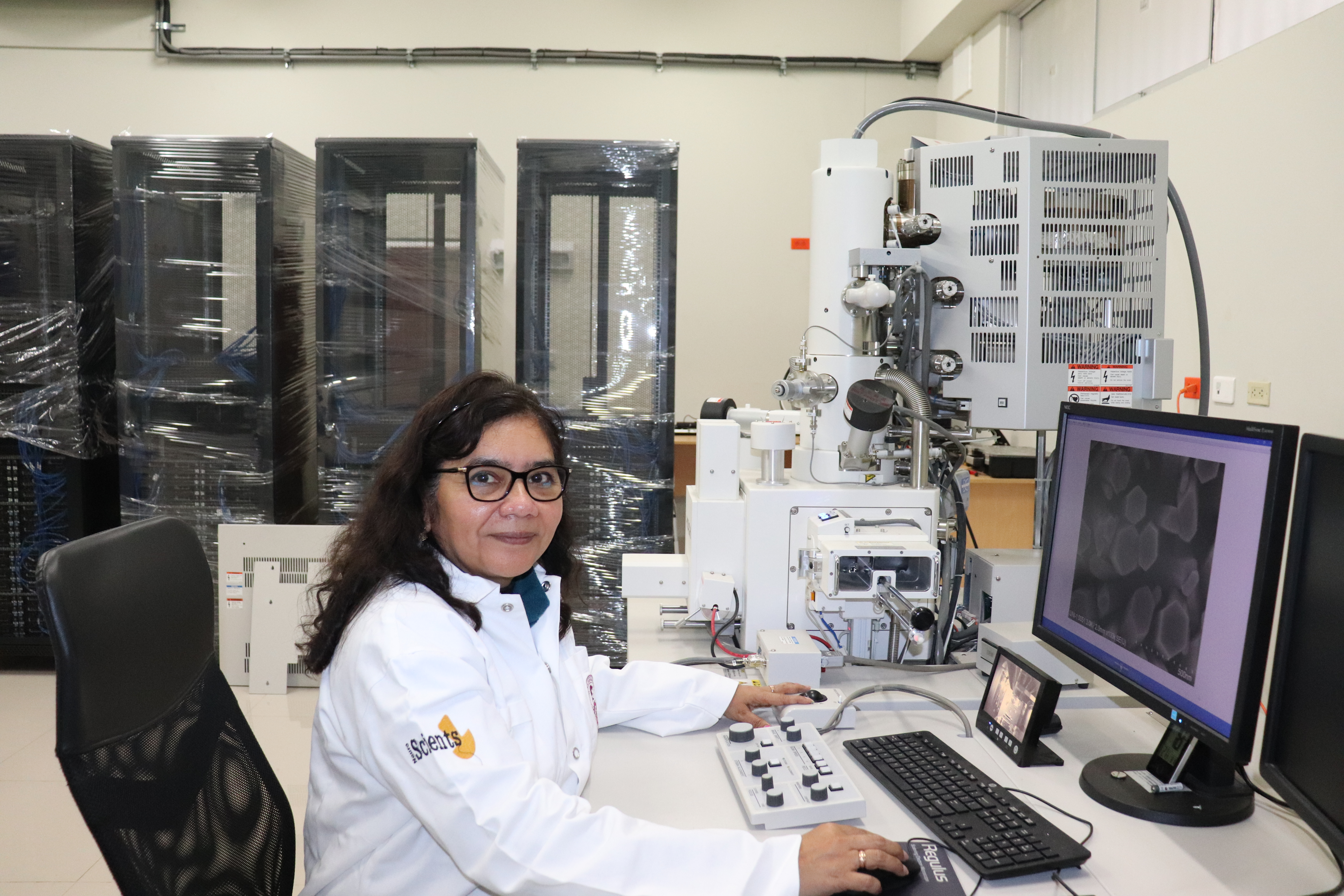
- Born: Maria Esther Quintana Caceda; 1967 (age 58–59); Peru
- Education: National University of Engineering
- Scientific career
- Workplaces: National University of Engineering Cayetano Heredia University (2017 - 2023) University of Engineering and Technology (2013 - 2017)

Maria Quintana (Lima,1967) was born in Peru. She studied Chemical Engineering at the National University of Engineering. She obtained a master's degree in Chemistry and Chemical Engineering, followed by a PhD in Chemistry with a specialisation in nanomaterials for photovoltaic applications, and conducted postdoctoral research at the Royal Institute of Technology, focusing on solid-state solar cells. At present, Maria is actively involved in projects related to the fabrication of nanoparticles, employing different techniques for their application in various types of devices.

In 2019, she received an award for her efforts towards the Organisation for Economic Co-operation and Development (OECD), and was invited to share her story as a woman in engineering in the book called Matilda, a new chapter of women in Engineering in Latin America.

== Scientific contributions ==
=== Enhancing biogas production using iron nanocomposites ===
The proposal to improve biogas in Peru emerged because the lack of proper treatment of organic waste. It is a renewable gas produced from the decomposition of organic waste generated by industries such as food industry, agriculture and livestock. A team of researchers, Dr Maria Esther Quintana Cáceda, Karenina Macazana, Rosa Flores, and William Gómez, has successfully enhanced biogas production through the addition of iron oxide nanoparticles. This innovation promotes a circular economy by ensuring the efficient reuse of organic waste.

=== Chemical synthesis of graphene ===
Maria Quintana and Ana Champi aimed to synthesise graphene through chemical methods for its application in dye-sensitised solar cells. Graphene functions as an efficient electrical and thermal conductor, possesses superior strength compared to steel.

=== Ayrampo: Natural dyes for solar cells ===
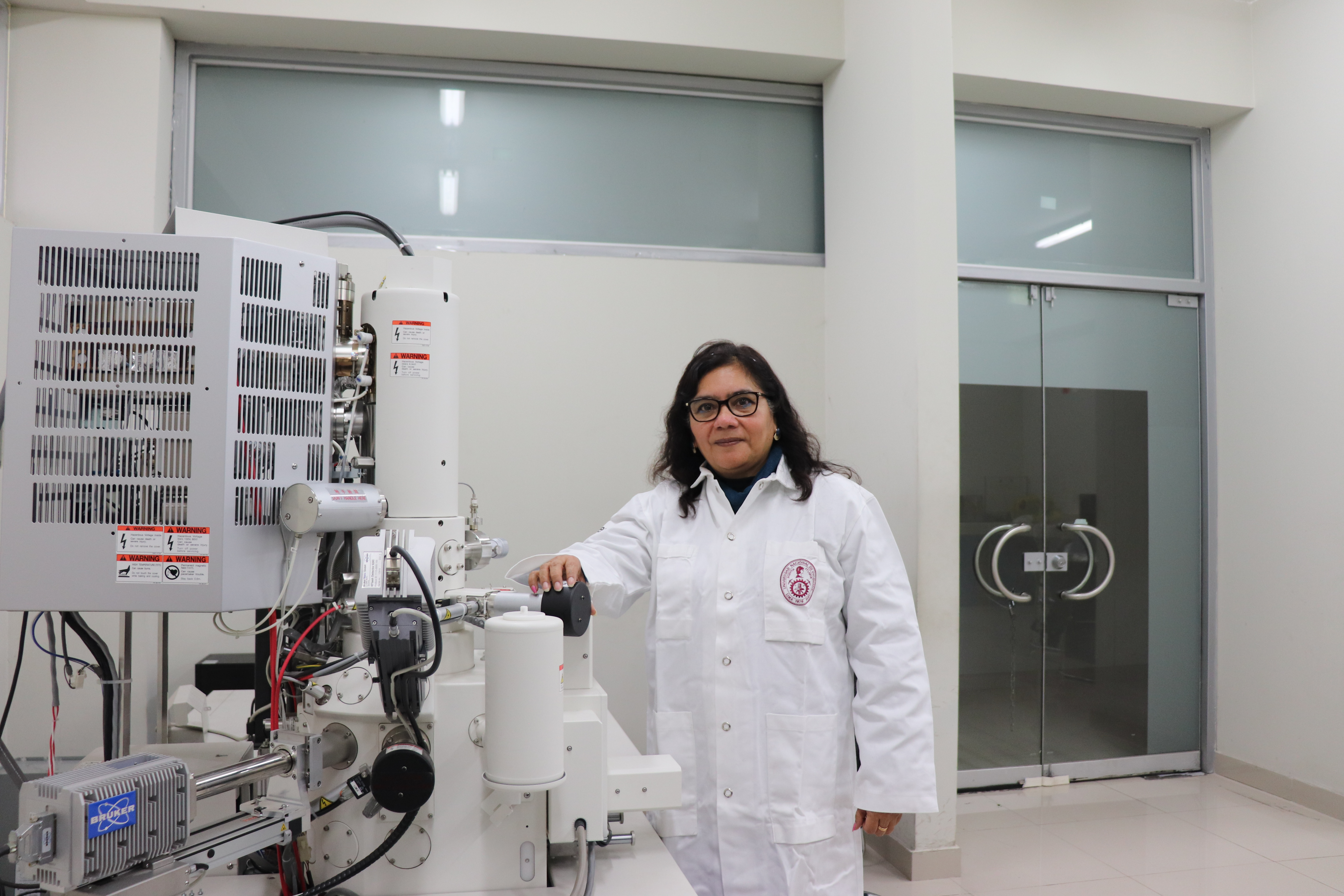
Dr. Maria Quintana Caceda in her laboratory at the National University of Engineering, Lima–Peru.

In the search for an effective dye to enhance the light and heat sensitivity of solar cells, researchers discovered that airampo (a cactus used in textil and food) could be used to produce a natural dye. Although they had previously tested chicha morada (a traditional Peruvian drink made from purple corn) and sangre de grado (also known as dragon's blood), but ayrampo exhibited the highest electrical performance.

=== Treatment of wastewater contaminated with dyes from the textile industry ===
Students from Cayetano Heredia University, together with Dr. Maria Quintana and Dr. Pierre Ramos, proposed the use of the Photo-Fenton process in their Environmental Chemistry and Physics course for the treatment of wastewater contaminated with azo dyes. The proposal arose by the recognition that, according to the United Nations, the textile industry is the second most polluting sector and it is responsible for 20% of freshwater contamination in the country. This dye is the most toxic among synthetic dyes, and by applying the Photo-Fenton process, the dye was effectively degraded it. Furthermore, the study confirmed that this process is a viable option due to its low cost in Peru.

== Awards and recognitions ==
=== Reintegration Scholarship ===
In 2011, Peruvian National Council for Science, Technology and Technological Innovation (CONCYTEC), National Fund for Scientific, Technological and Technological Innovation Development (FONDECYT) and National System of Science, Technology and Technological Innovation (SINACYT) awarded Dr Maria Quintana in recognition for her research titled "Production of Silver Nanoparticles, Zinc Oxide, and Iron Oxide for Water Purification".

=== 2019 Award Gala – Special Distinction ===
In 2019, María Quintana received recognition for her environmental initiative titled "No More Lead: Decontaminating Buoys for Agricultural-Influenced Lakes to Remove Lead Contamination". The project aimed to address the issue of lead pollution in freshwater ecosystems impacted by agricultural runoff. Quintana's work led to the development of a prototype system consisting of interconnected decontaminating buoys designed to extract heavy metals from contaminated lakes. Following successful results during the initial study phase, her contribution was acknowledged for its potential impact on sustainable water resource management and environmental remediation.

=== Collaboration in the book: Matilda, a new chapter of women in Engineering in Latin America ===
In 2019, The Federal Council of Deans of Engineering of the Argentine Republic (CONFEDI) and Latin American and Caribbean Consortium of Engineering Institutions (LACCEI) had their first project, resulting in the publication of a book designed to show the role of women in engineering and inspiring young Latin Americans to pursue a career in science. As part of this initiative, Maria Quintana was selected to share her life in the book.
