= Modesto Montoya =

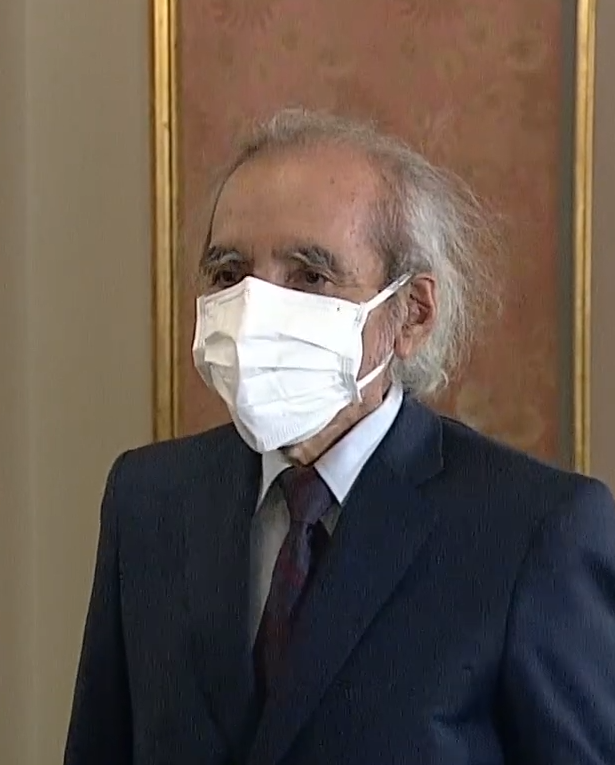
- Born: 24 February 1949 (age 77); Salpo, Peru
- Education: National University of Engineering
- Occupation: Nuclear physicist
- Employer: Peruvian Institute of Nuclear Energy

Modesto Montoya (born 24 February 1949) is a nuclear physicist and former president of the Peruvian Institute of Nuclear Energy in Lima, Peru. He is a former president and current member of the Peruvian Academy of Nuclear Sciences, former president of the Peruvian Physical Society and member for Peruvian National Academy of Sciences. In 2021, he became an advisor to President Pedro Castillo on science matters. He served as minister of the environment of Peru.

== Academic activities ==
Modesto Montoya was born in Salpo, La Libertad. At age 12, he began studies to be an electrical technician at the current National Polytechnic of Santa. At age 17, he received a scholarship to study at the José Pardo Principal Polytechnic. At the age of 18, he entered the National University of Engineering.

He holds a BSc, a Lic. a MSc in physics from the National University of Engineering, a DEA, a doctorat de 3eme cycle and a doctorat d'Etat from the Paris-Sud 11 University. He is affiliated as professor to the National University of Engineering and he teaches scientific and technological subjects at Centro de Preparación para la Ciencia y Tecnología (Ceprecyt).

== Research ==
Montoya's research work was on cold fission at the CEA Saclay and he participated in the discovery of nucleon-pair breaking in cold fission, phenomenum studied also by Hervé Nifenecker in cold fission of uranium 233, uranium 235 and plutonium 239. He also studied the mass and kinetic energy distribution of fragments in cold fission.

Between 1985 and 1986 he was guest scientist at (GSI) in Darmstadt in the group led by Peter Armbruster, dedicated to research on transuranides nuclei. At GSI published his work on Coulomb and shell effects in low energy fission.,

As guest scientist at the Institut de Physique Nucléaire, Orsay, in the Bernard Borderie's group, he participated in research on deeply inelastic collisions. He was also invited by the Carnegie-Mellon Institute in the Morton Kaplan group dedicated to ternary fragmentations in nuclear collisions.

Montoya now studies the effects of neutron emissions on measurements of fission fragments.

== Promoting science and technology ==
Montoya has had his opinions on science and technology published in a number of articles in the main Peruvian newspapers. As part of his promotional activities he found the International Scientific Meeting (ECI) Encuentro Científico Internacional for which is recognized by international institutions.
