= Mónica Gómez León =

Peruvian scientist

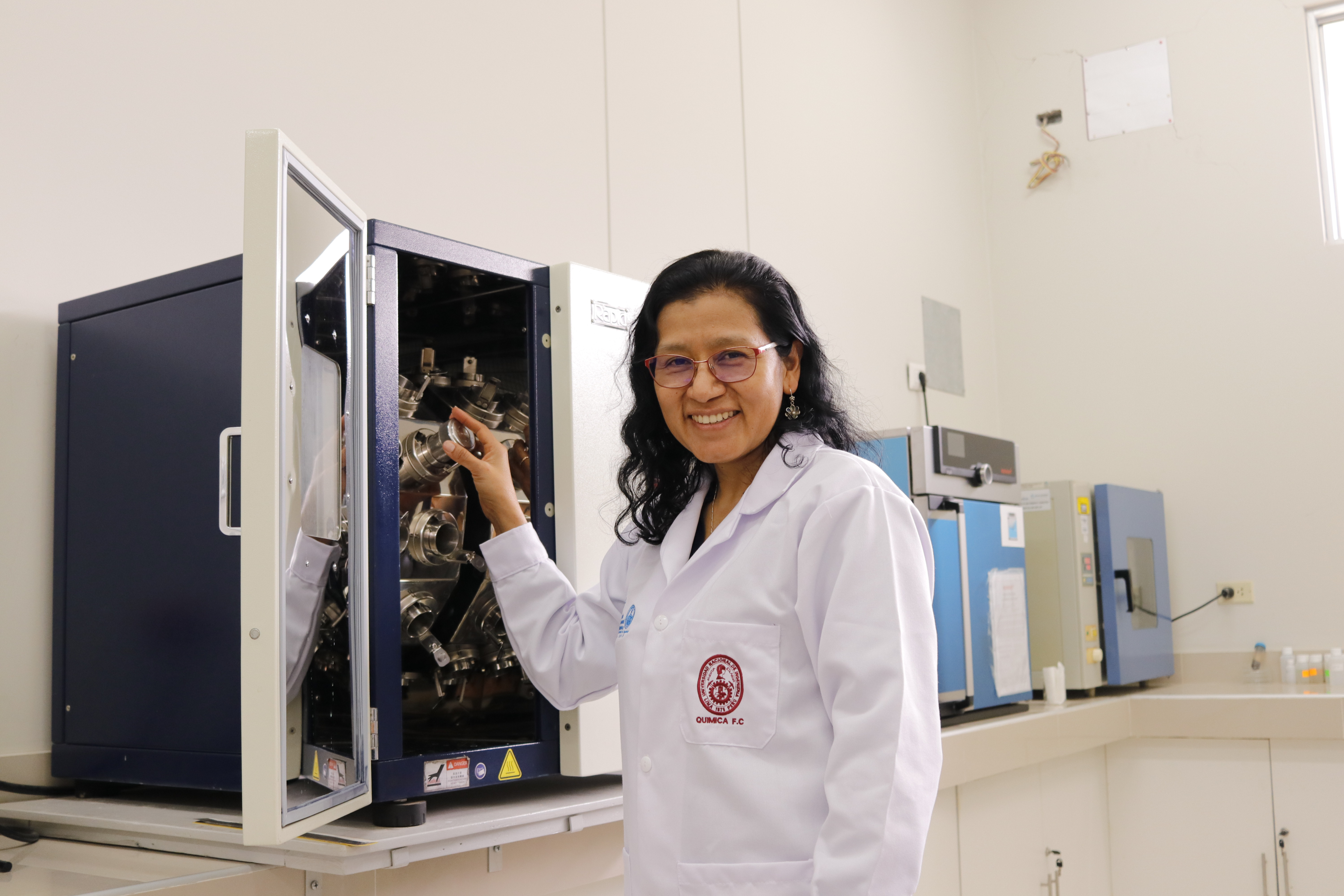
- Education: National University of Engineering
- Known for: Functional textiles, sustainable energy, environmental solutions
- Awards: L'Oréal-UNESCO For Women in Science Awards

Mónica Marcela Gómez León (Lima, 1970) is a Peruvian scientist renowned for her contributions to materials science and engineering. She studied chemistry at the National University of Engineering (UNI) and earned a PhD in Physics through a joint doctoral program between UNI and Uppsala University in Sweden. In 2001, she became the first woman to receive a Doctor of Science with a specialization in Physics from UNI. Her research spans materials science, nanotechnology, and environmental sustainability, with practical applications in antimicrobial functional textiles, sustainable rural housing, eco-efficient water treatment systems, and renewable energy technologies.

== Early life and education ==
Mónica Gomez León was born in Lima, Peru. Following her secondary education, she chose to pursue a career in the sciences. In 1989, she began undergraduate studies in chemistry at the Faculty of Sciences of the National University of Engineering. Early in her academic trajectory, she became involved in experimental research groups, which contributed to the expedited completion of her undergraduate thesis.

Driven by a commitment to advanced scientific training, Gómez León enrolled in a doctoral program in Physics abroad. At the age of 27, she commenced doctoral studies in Sweden through an institutional partnership between UNI and Uppsala University. In August 2001, at age 30, she became the first woman to earn a Doctor of Science degree with a specialization in Physics from UNI, coinciding with the birth of her first daughter.

Facing the challenges of balancing academic life and motherhood, she temporarily resigned from her university teaching position to focus on full-time caregiving. Three years later, following the birth of her second daughter, she undertook studies in Early Childhood Education to design and implement a home-based learning program for both children.

== Career ==
After a decade-long hiatus from academia, Gómez León resumed her scientific career with renewed focus and dedication. In 2011, she was awarded the L’Oréal-UNESCO For Women in Science Prize marking a significant milestone in her professional reintegration. She subsequently undertook research fellowships at several prominent international institutions, including the École Polytechnique Fédérale de Lausanne (EPFL) in Switzerland, the Center for Research and Advanced Materials in Mexico, the University of Oulu in Finland, the National Research Council of Italy, and the Solar Energy Center of India—now known as the National Institute of Solar Energy. She eventually returned to her alma mater, the National University of Engineering, where she currently serves as a principal research professor.

During the COVID-19 pandemic, she co-led—together with her husband, Dr. José Luis Solis Veliz— the development of advanced functional textiles incorporating embedded nanoparticles. These engineered materials were designed to impart antimicrobial, antifungal, and ultraviolet (UV) protective properties, thereby providing an additional layer of protection for healthcare personnel wearing garments fabricated from such textiles.

In 2023, Gómez submitted a proposal in response to a national call issued by the National Council for Science, Technology and Innovation of Peru (CONCYTEC), through its executive agency Prociencia, for the creation of a high-level doctoral program. Her proposal ranked first among 66 submissions and was ultimately selected as one of eight new state-sponsored programs. This marked a historic milestone for Peru by establishing doctoral scholarships with competitive salaries and internationally recognized standards. In 2024, Gómez was appointed as the Coordinator of the newly established Doctoral Program in Science with a specialization in Physics at the National University of Engineering.

== Research ==
Gómez's research spans the fields of materials science, nanotechnology, and environmental sustainability, with a particular focus on applications that enhance public health and rural living conditions. Her work integrates advanced functional materials with ecological and socio-technical concerns, contributing to interdisciplinary innovation across textiles, architecture, and environmental remediation. Her scientific output includes 36 articles indexed in Scopus, and she has been recognized with the "Distinguished Researcher" designation by the Peruvian National Registry of Science, Technology and Technological Innovation (RENACYT) of CONCYTEC.

Functional Textiles and Nanomaterials

A central theme of Gómez's research is the development of functional textiles enhanced with nanomaterials. One of her notable projects involved the creation of antimicrobial and UV-protective cotton fabrics through the incorporation of semiconductor nanoparticles, such as zinc oxide, copper oxide, and titanium dioxide. These materials confer dual functionality, offering antifungal and antimicrobial protection while enhancing resistance to ultraviolet radiation. In clinical contexts, she further developed bactericidal surface treatments for hospital textiles using zinc oxide nanoparticles, aimed at reducing the incidence of hospital-acquired infections.

Sustainable Architecture and Rural Technologies

Beyond textile applications, Gómez has investigated material design strategies for high-altitude Andean housing. Her research has emphasized the development of frost-resistant construction techniques and thermal comfort solutions suitable for extreme climatic conditions. She has also explored renewable energy systems and environmental technologies tailored to rural housing, including sustainable methods for energy and water provisioning.

Environmental Remediation and Eco-Materials

Her work in environmental sustainability includes research in photocatalysis, natural dye extraction, and wastewater treatment technologies. In 2024, she co-authored a study on the removal of chromium from tannery effluents using natural zeolite Neonite, evaluating its efficacy as an environmentally friendly sorbent for industrial wastewater purification.

== Awards and Recognitions ==
In 2011, during the fourth edition of the L'Oréal-UNESCO For Women in Science Awards, Gómez was honored for her research on the development of bactericidal textiles designed for clinical environments. Her work was recognized as a significant advancement in the application of scientific innovation to public health and hospital hygiene, and it was commended for its contribution to strengthening Peru's capacity in science and technology.

In 2021, the National Council for Science, Technology and Technological Innovation of Peru (CONCYTEC) recognized Gómez's contributions to scientific advancement by featuring her in the publication Científicas del Perú: 24 historias por descubrir (Women Scientists of Peru: 24 Stories to Discover), a compendium highlighting the careers and achievements of prominent Peruvian women in science.

In 2024, the Organization of Ibero-American States (OEI) named her a national reference in its initiative Somos Mujeres y Hacemos Ciencia en Perú (We Are Women and We Do Science in Peru), a program designed to spotlight leading female scientists and promote gender equity in scientific research across Ibero-America.
