= Miguel De La Torre Sobrevilla =

- Born: Lima, Peru
- Education: Universidad Nacional de Ingeniería
- Geosynthetics, Geotechnics

Miguel De La Torre Sobrevilla is a Peruvian engineer and entrepreneur who founded the engineering and consulting company Geoservice Ingeniería back on 1995, he undertook his undergraduate on Civil Engineering at Universidad Nacional de Ingeniería from 1961 to 1965. He is specialist in dam engineering, foundations, slope stability, geotechnical instrumentation and related activities with geotechnical engineering applied to energy projects, irrigation, transportation and mining nationwide.

== Geosynthetics in Peru ==
De La Torre is a pioneer of Geosynthetics applications in Peru. In 2000, he led along with his company Geoservice Ingeniería the usage of geogrids in roads constructions, Peruvian Transport Ministry as well as the engineering community were adamant to the implementation of geogrids back on those days. However, nowadays geogrids, geotextiles, and groundwater drainage system are a widely utilized in Peruvian roads construction and Peruvian Transport Ministry fully accept the usage of geogrids.

Peruvian mining industry is using geosynthetics more often in order to control emission of toxics materials due to mining processing and operations, the type of geosynthetics materials support the development of mining activities and they are not harmful for the environment as these are not biodegradables, having as long as 100 years of lifetime. Peru is currently, across Latin America, one of the leaders in using geosynthetics in mining and infrastructure projects.

== Appointments ==
During the period 2007-2008, De La Torre was appointed president of the board of directors of International Geosynthetics Society (IGS) in Peru. [3]. IGS Peru was founded in 2001 and constitutes the first chapter of the IGS in Spanish speaking countries across Latin America.

== Works ==
De La Torre lead execution of dams construction, hydrological services, feasibilities studies, geotechnical evaluations, Environmental impact assessment, closure plan preparations for mining companies in Peru such as Toquepala mine, Uchucchacua, Tia Maria mine, Parcoy gold mine, Las Bambas copper mine, Yauricocha Mine.
