= Uchucchacuaite =

Sulfosalt mineral

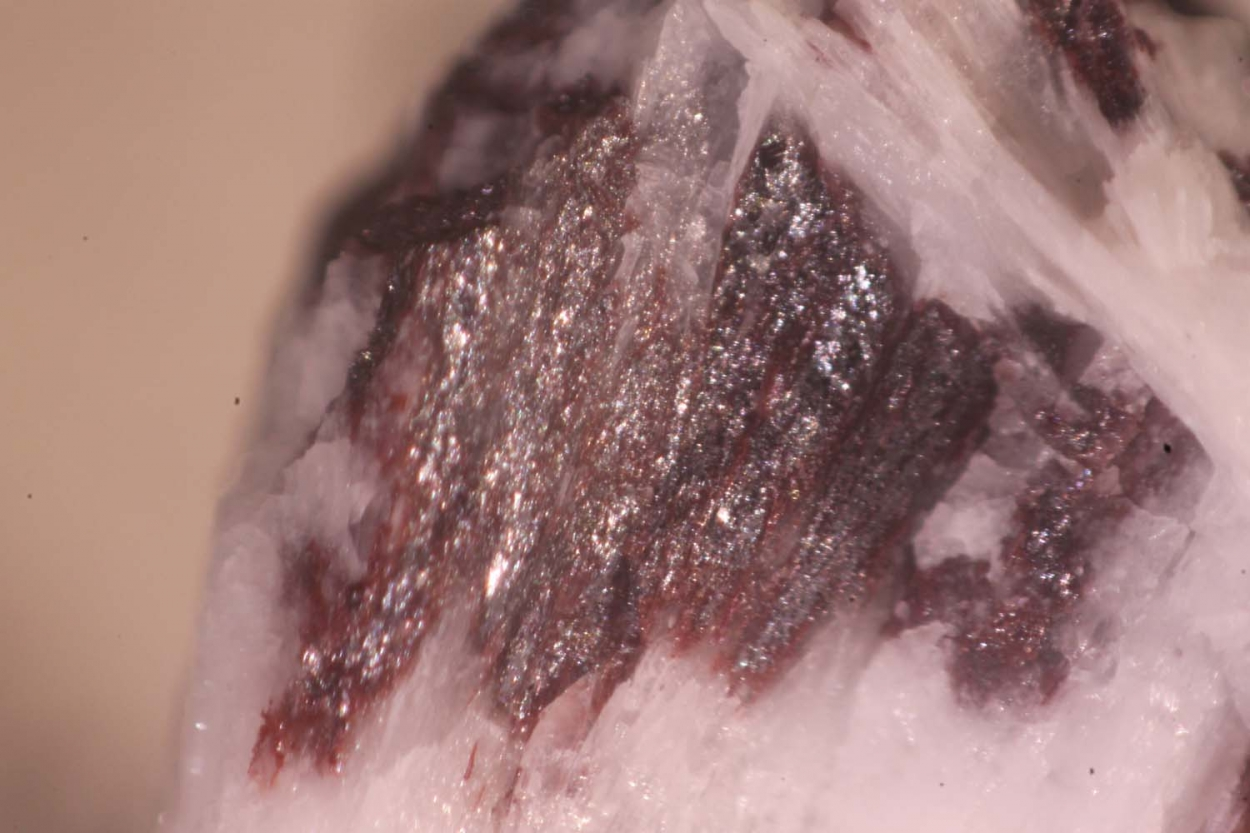
- Uchucchacuaite in a matrix

General
- Category: Sulfosalt minerals
- Formula: AgMnPb_{3}Sb_{5}S_{12}
- IMA symbol: Uch
- Strunz classification: 2.JB.40a
- Crystal system: Orthorhombic
- Crystal class: Dipyramidal (mmm); H-M symbol: (2/m 2/m 2/m)
- Space group: Pmmm
- Unit cell: a = 12.67 Å, b = 19.32 Å c = 4.38 Å; Z = 4

Identification
- Color: grey
- Luster: metallic
- Diaphaneity: opaque

Uchucchacuaite (AgMnPb_{3}Sb_{5}S_{12}) is a rare sulfosalt mineral found in hydrothermal deposits.

It was first described in 1984 for an occurrence in the Uchucchacua Mine, Oyon Province, Lima Department, Peru, and named for the mine. It has also been reported from mines in Hokkaido, Japan. It occurs with alabandite, galena, benavidesite, sphalerite, pyrite, pyrrhotite and arsenopyrite in the Peru deposit.
