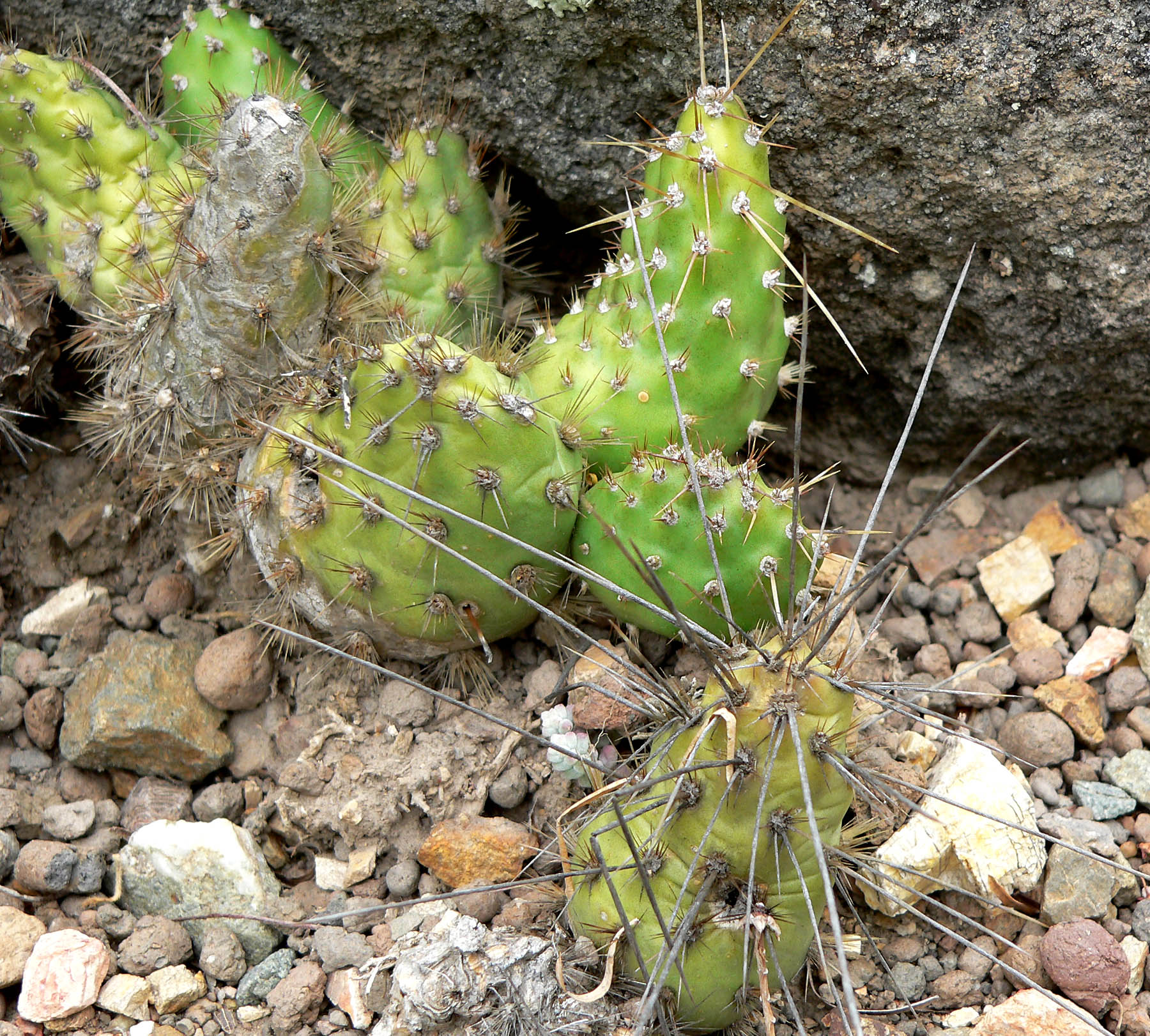
- Airampoa ayrampo

Scientific classification
- Kingdom: Plantae
- Clade: Tracheophytes
- Clade: Angiosperms
- Clade: Eudicots
- Order: Caryophyllales
- Family: Cactaceae
- Subfamily: Opuntioideae
- Tribe: Opuntieae
- Genus: Airampoa; Frič 1929

Type species
- Airampoa corrugata

Species
- See text

Synonyms
- Tunilla D.R.Hunt & Iliff, 2000

= Airampoa =

Genus of cacti

Airampoa is a South American plant genus in the cactus family (Cactaceae).

== Species ==
Species of the genus Airampoa according to Plants of the World Online as of September 2026:

| Image | Scientific name | Distribution |
|---|---|---|
| | Airampoa ayrampo (Haenke) Doweld | Argentina, Bolivia, Chile, Peru |
| | Airampoa corrugata (Salm-Dyck) Doweld | Argentina |
| | Airampoa erectoclada (Backeb.) Doweld | Argentina |
| | Airampoa tilcarensis (Backeb.) Doweld | Argentina (Jujuy) |
