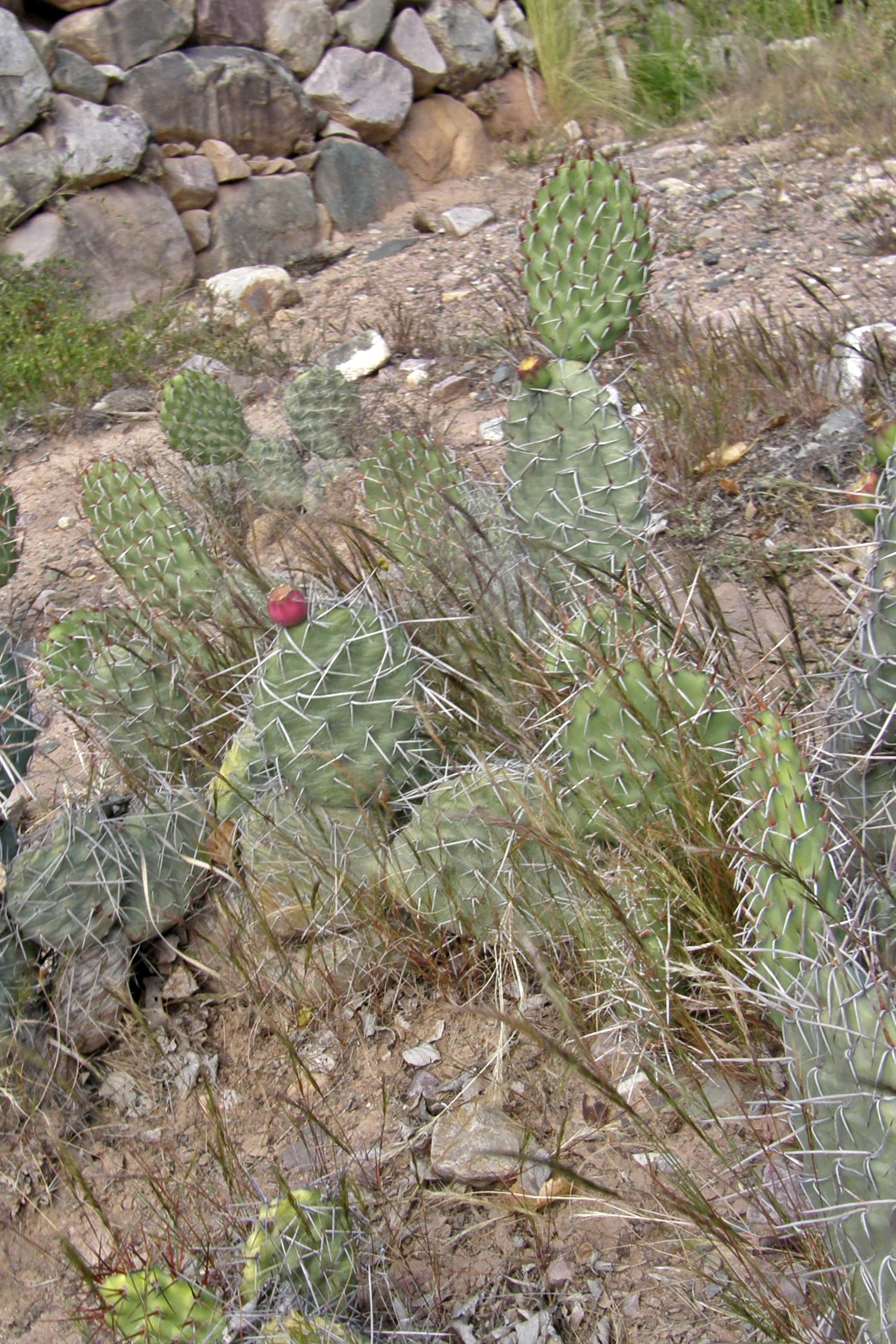

Conservation status
- Least Concern (IUCN 3.1)

Scientific classification
- Kingdom: Plantae
- Clade: Tracheophytes
- Clade: Angiosperms
- Clade: Eudicots
- Order: Caryophyllales
- Family: Cactaceae
- Genus: Airampoa
- Species: A. tilcarensis

Binomial name
- Airampoa tilcarensis (Backeb.) Doweld 2002

Synonyms
- Opuntia tilcarensis Backeb. in C.Backeberg & F.M.Knuth, 1936; Platyopuntia soehrensii var. tilcarensis (Backeb.) F.Ritter 1980; Tephrocactus tilcarensis (Backeb.) G.D.Rowley 2006; Tunilla tilcarensis (Backeb.) D.R.Hunt & Iliff 2000; Opuntia tilcarensis var. rubellispina Backeb. 1962

= Airampoa tilcarensis =

Species of cactus

Airampoa tilcarensis is a species of Airampoa found in Jujuy, Argentina.

== Description ==
Airampoa tilcarensis is a small, compact cactus that grows in a cushion-like form. Its cylindrical stems are deep green. The cactus has very long, straight, needle-like spines, typically fox-brown and 6–13 cm long. Its flowers are usually bright yellow, though some varieties have salmon-colored blooms.

== Distribution ==
This species is native to Jujuy Province in Argentina, A. tilcarensis grows mainly in deserts and dry scrubland.

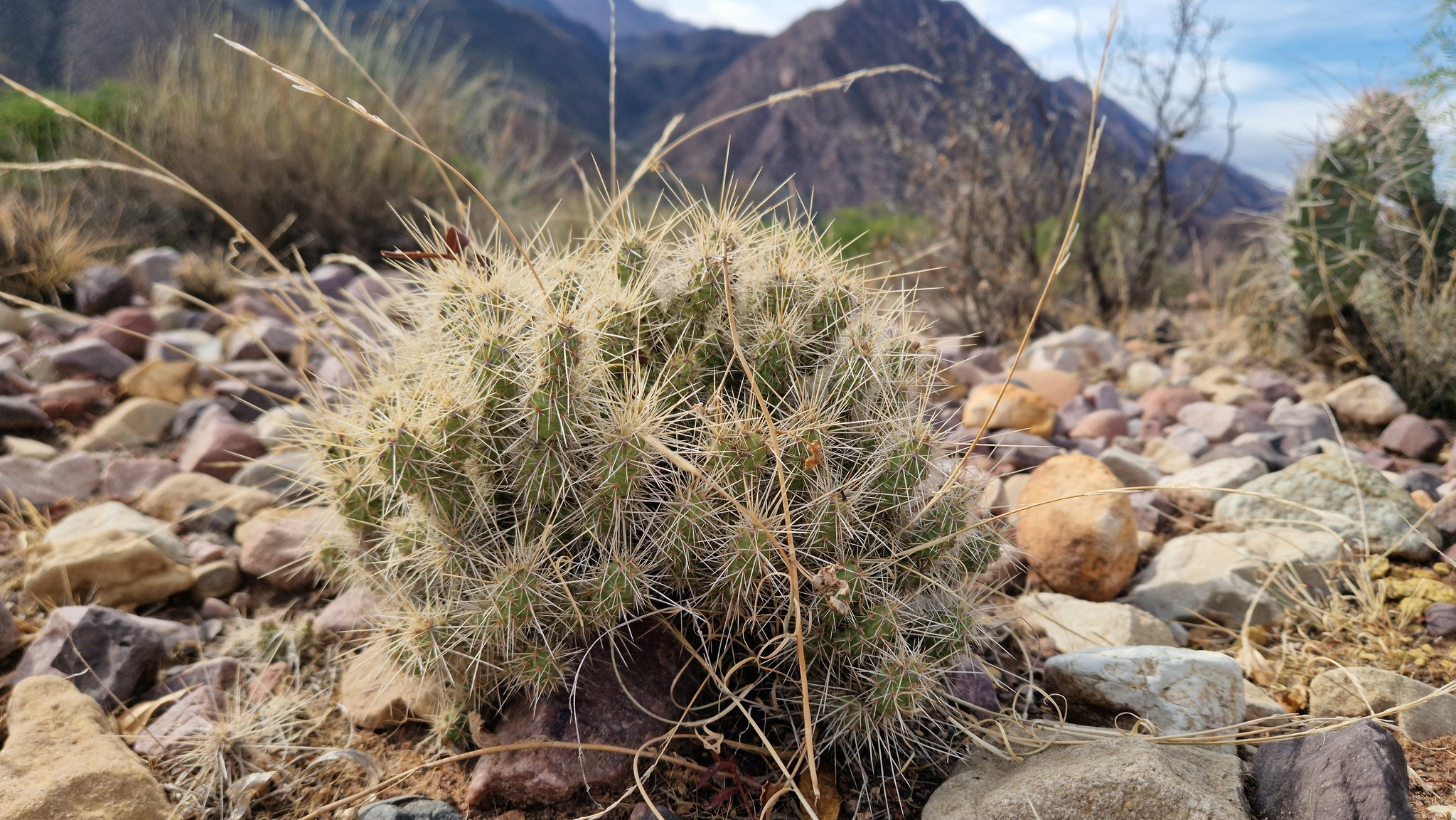
Plant growing in habitat

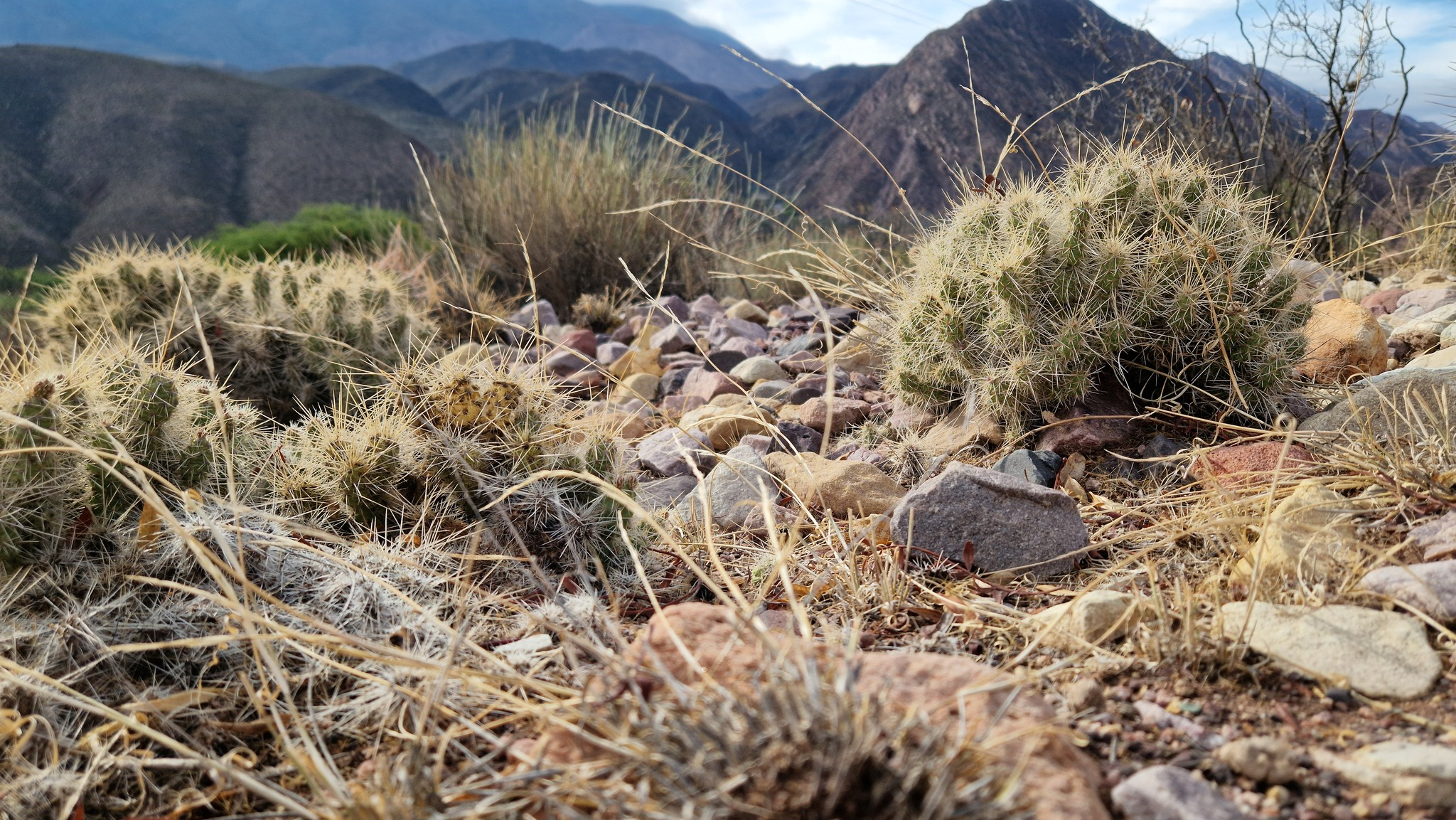
Habitat in Jujuy, Argentina

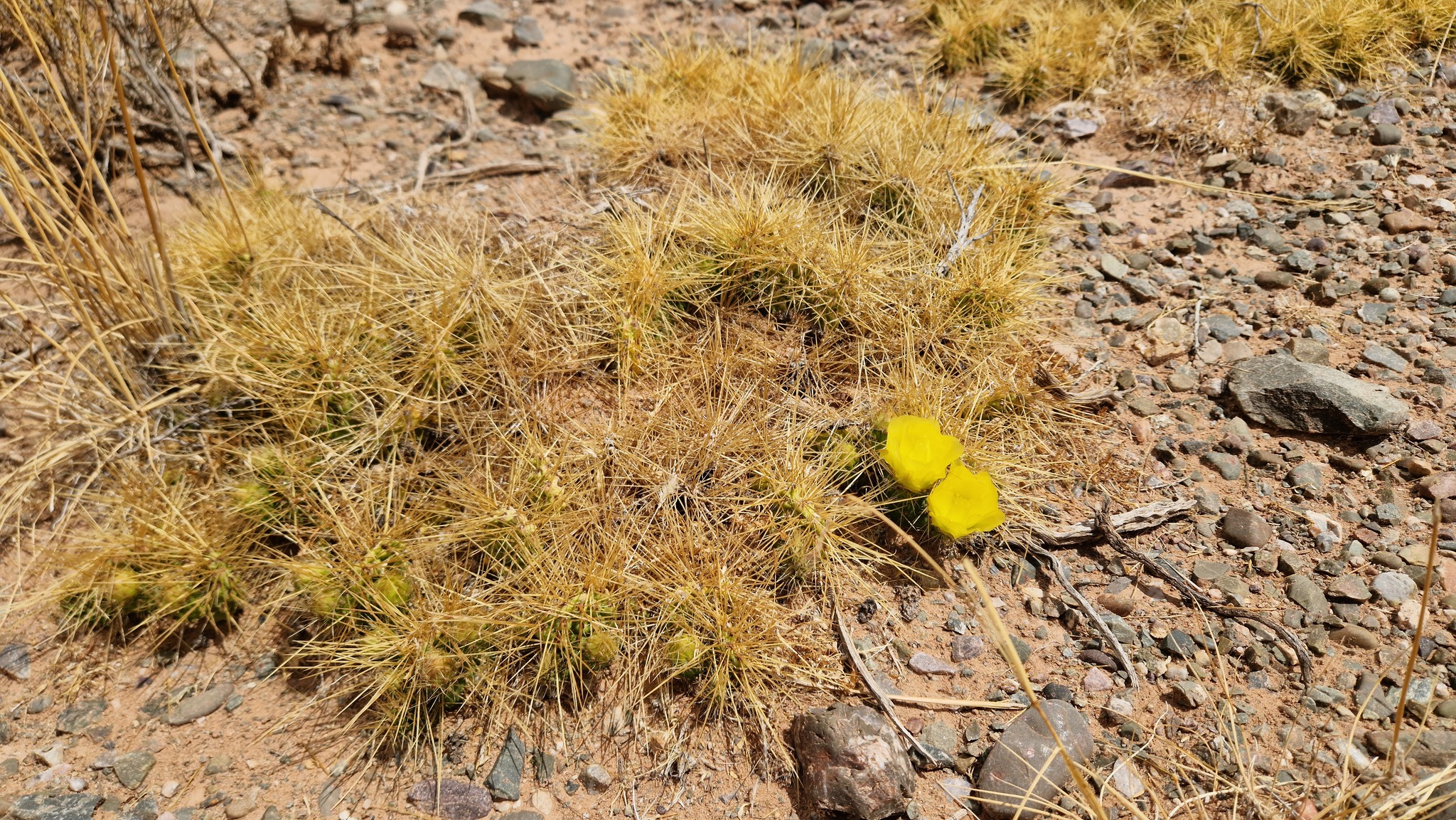
Plant blooming in habitat

== Taxonomy ==
Curt Backeberg first described the species as Opuntia tilcarensis in 1936, in Kaktus-ABC (p. 411). The name tilcarensis refers to Tilcara, the Argentine department where the species was discovered. In 2002, Aleksandr Doveld transferred it to the genus Airampoa, publishing the new name Airampoa tilcarensis in Turczaninowia 5:30.
