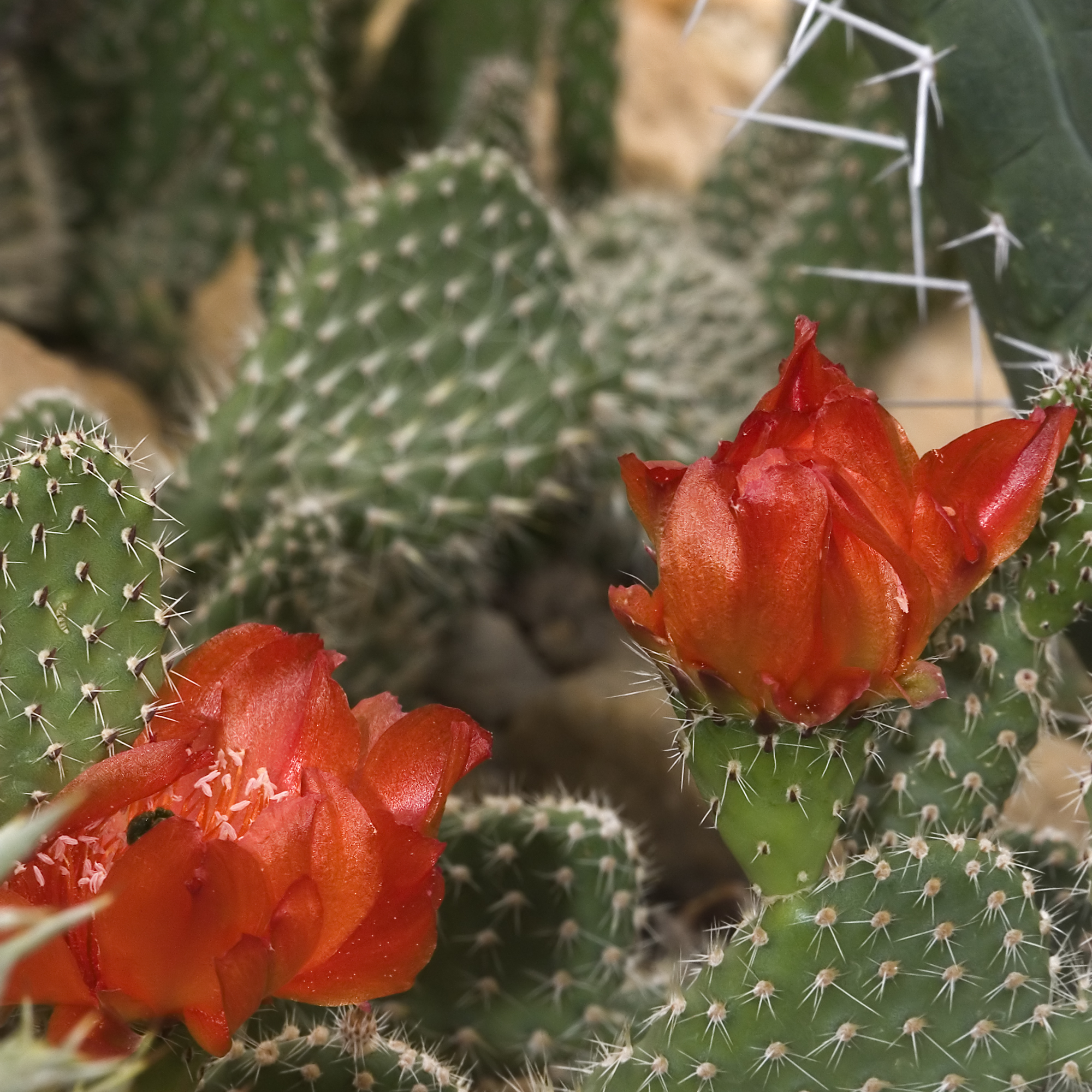

Scientific classification
- Kingdom: Plantae
- Clade: Tracheophytes
- Clade: Angiosperms
- Clade: Eudicots
- Order: Caryophyllales
- Family: Cactaceae
- Genus: Airampoa
- Species: A. erectoclada

Binomial name
- Airampoa erectoclada (Backeb.) Doweld 2002

Synonyms
- List: Opuntia erectoclada Backeb. 1936; Tephrocactus erectocladus (Backeb.) G.D.Rowley 2006; Tunilla erectoclada (Backeb.) D.R.Hunt & Iliff 2000; Airampoa ianthinantha (F.Ritter) Doweld 2002; Airampoa picardoi (Marn.-Lap.) Doweld 2002; Opuntia ianthinantha (F.Ritter) Iliff 1997; Opuntia multiareolata Backeb. 1962; Opuntia obliqua Backeb. 1962; Opuntia picardoi Marn.-Lap. 1960; Platyopuntia ianthinantha F.Ritter 1980; Tunilla ianthinantha (F.Ritter) D.R.Hunt & Iliff 2000; Tunilla picardoi D.R.Hunt & Iliff 2000); Tunilla picardoi Marn.-Lap. ex Guiggi & Delanoy nom. illeg.

= Airampoa erectoclada =

Species of cactus

Airampoa erectoclada is a species of Airampoa found in Argentina
