= Edward Jan Habich =

Polish engineer and mathematician

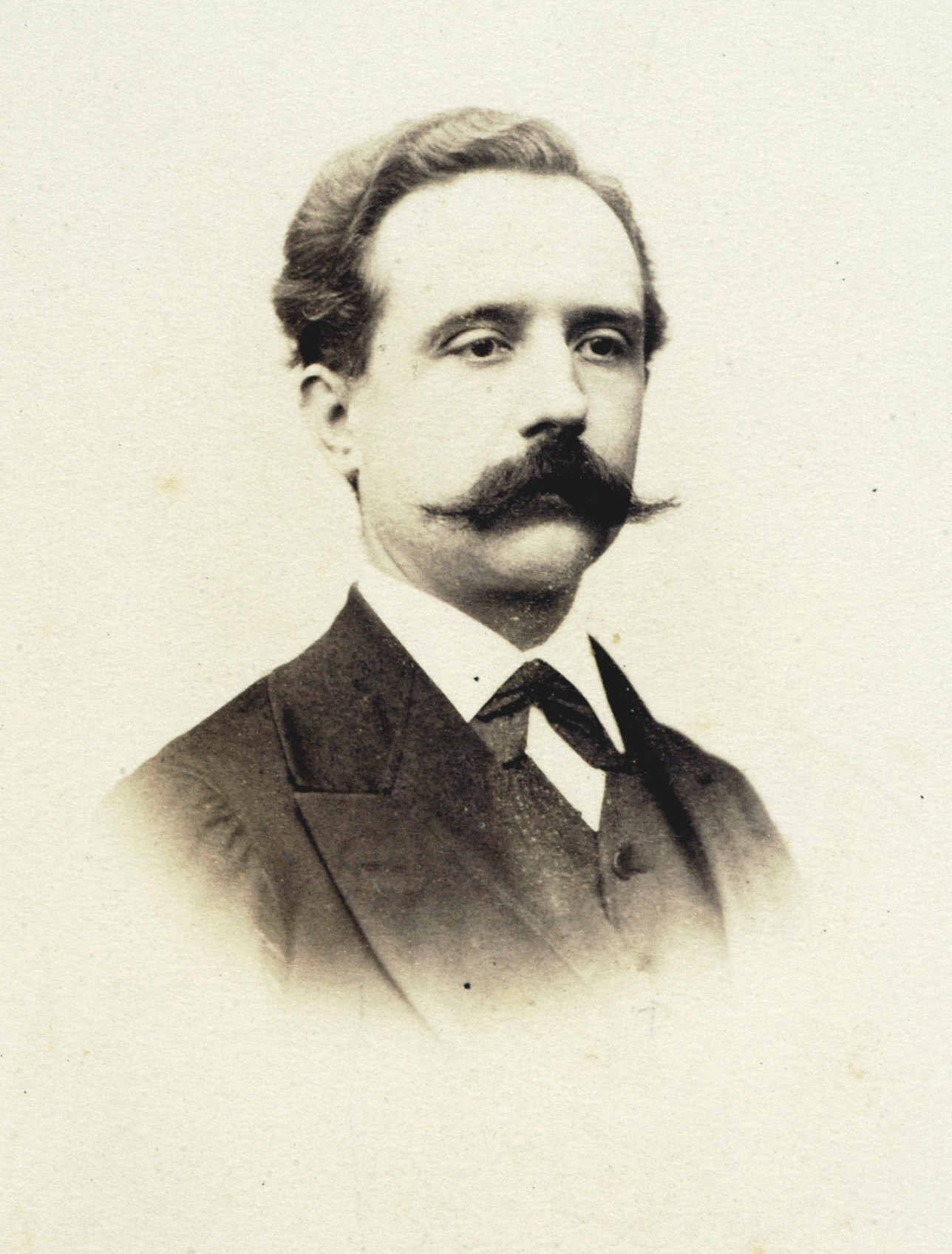
- Born: January 31, 1835; Warsaw, Russian Empire
- Died: October 31, 1909 (aged 74); Lima, Peru

Edward Jan Habich (Spanish: Eduardo de Habich) (31 January 1835, Warsaw – 31 October 1909, Lima, Peru) was a Polish engineer and mathematician. In 1876, he founded the National University of Engineering (Spanish: Universidad Nacional de Ingeniería), a renowned engineering school in Lima, Peru. He was a member of the Peruvian Geographic Society and an Honorary Citizen of Peru. In his native Poland, he took part in the January Uprising against the Russian Empire in 1863.

== Burial ==
Edward Jan Habich is buried at the Cementerio Presbítero Matías Maestro, Lima, Peru.

== Gallery ==
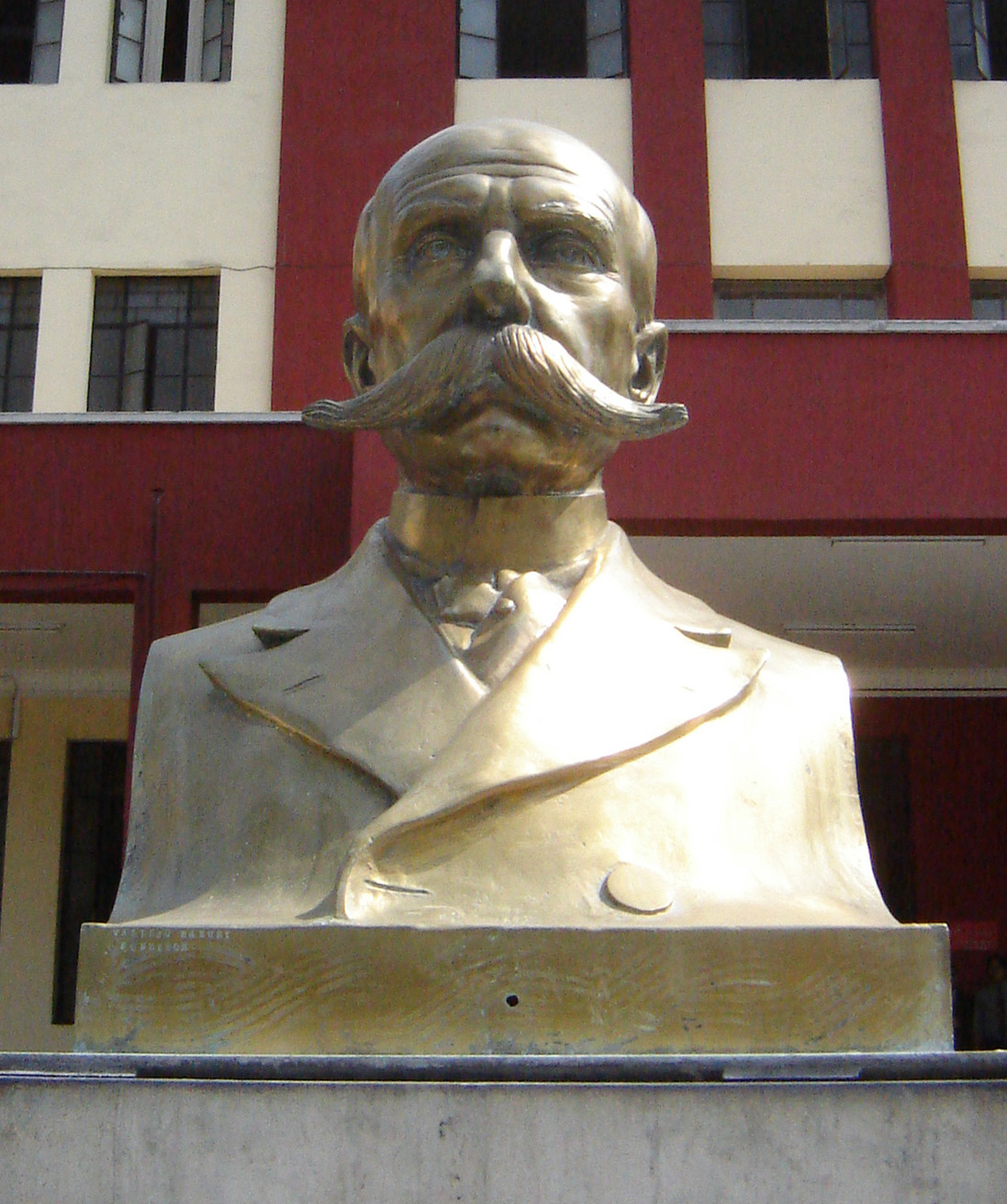
Bust of Edward Jan Habich at the National University of Engineering in Lima, Peru

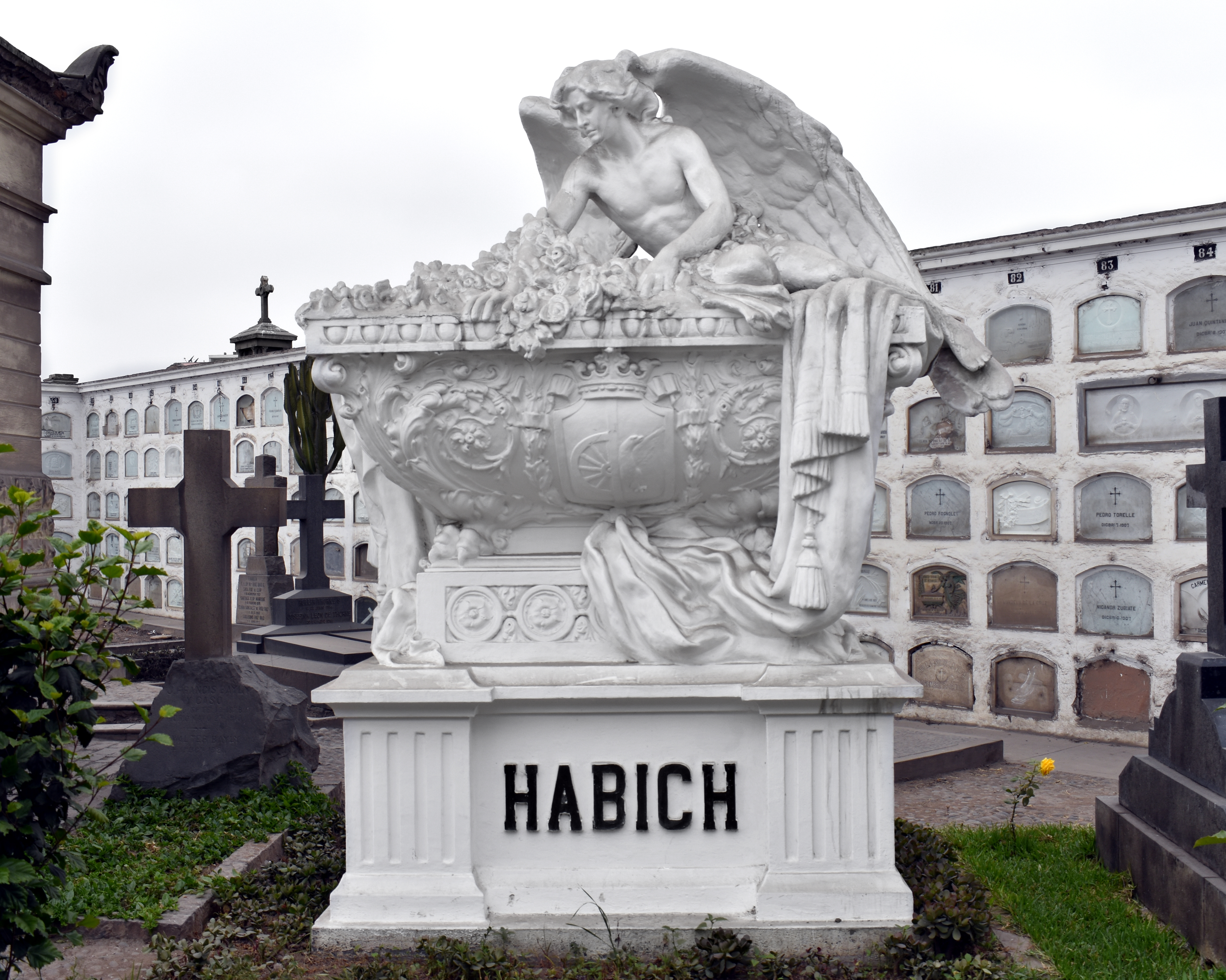
Sarcophagus of Eduardo Juan de Habich, Lima, Perú.
