= Airampoa corrugata =

Conservation status
- Least Concern (IUCN 3.1)

Scientific classification
- Kingdom: Plantae
- Clade: Tracheophytes
- Clade: Angiosperms
- Clade: Eudicots
- Order: Caryophyllales
- Family: Cactaceae
- Genus: Airampoa
- Species: A. corrugata

Binomial name
- Airampoa corrugata (Salm-Dyck) Doweld 2002

Synonyms
- List: Opuntia corrugata Salm-Dyck 1834; Opuntia longispina var. corrugata (Salm-Dyck) Backeb. 1953; Platyopuntia corrugata (Salm-Dyck) F.Ritter 1980; Tephrocactus corrugatus (Salm-Dyck) Backeb. 1936; Tunilla corrugata (Salm-Dyck) D.R.Hunt & Iliff 2000; Airampoa albisaetacens (Backeb.) Doweld 2002; Airampoa armata (Backeb.) Doweld 2002; Airampoa aurata Frič 1929; Airampoa microdisca (F.A.C.Weber) Doweld 2002; Opuntia albisaetacens Backeb. 1933; Opuntia albisaetacens var. robustior Backeb. 1962; Opuntia armata Backeb. 1953; Opuntia calantha Griffiths in 1916; Opuntia corrugata subsp. brevispina (Backeb.) Mottram 2004; Opuntia corrugata var. monvillei Salm-Dyck 1850; Opuntia eborina C.F.Först. ex Haage 1864; Opuntia eburnea Lem. 1838; Opuntia laetevirens Backeb. 1962; Opuntia longispina Haw. 1830; Opuntia longispina var. agglomerata Backeb. 1962; Opuntia longispina var. brevispina Backeb. 1953; Opuntia longispina var. flavidispina Backeb. 1953; Opuntia longispina var. intermedia Backeb. 1953; Opuntia microdisca F.A.C.Weber 1898; Opuntia parmentieri Pfeiff. 1838; Opuntia retrospinosa Lem. 1838; Platyopuntia albisaetacens (Backeb.) F.Ritter 1980; Platyopuntia microdisca (F.A.C.Weber) F.Ritter 1980; Tephrocactus microdiscus (F.A.C.Weber) G.D.Rowley 2006; Tephrocactus retrospinosus Lem. in Cactées: 88 (1868; Tephrocactus retrospinus Lem. ex C.F.Först. 1885; Tunilla albisaetacens (Backeb.) D.R.Hunt & Iliff 2000; Tunilla microdisca (F.A.C.Weber) D.R.Hunt & Iliff 2000

Species of cactus

Airampoa corrugata is a species of Airampoa found in Argentina.
