= Uchucchacua =

Mine in Oyón, Peru

Uchucchacua is a mine in Oyón province, region Lima, Peru. The mine exploits primarily silver, zinc and lead. The mineral uchucchacuaite is named after the mine. 10.63°S 76.68°W
