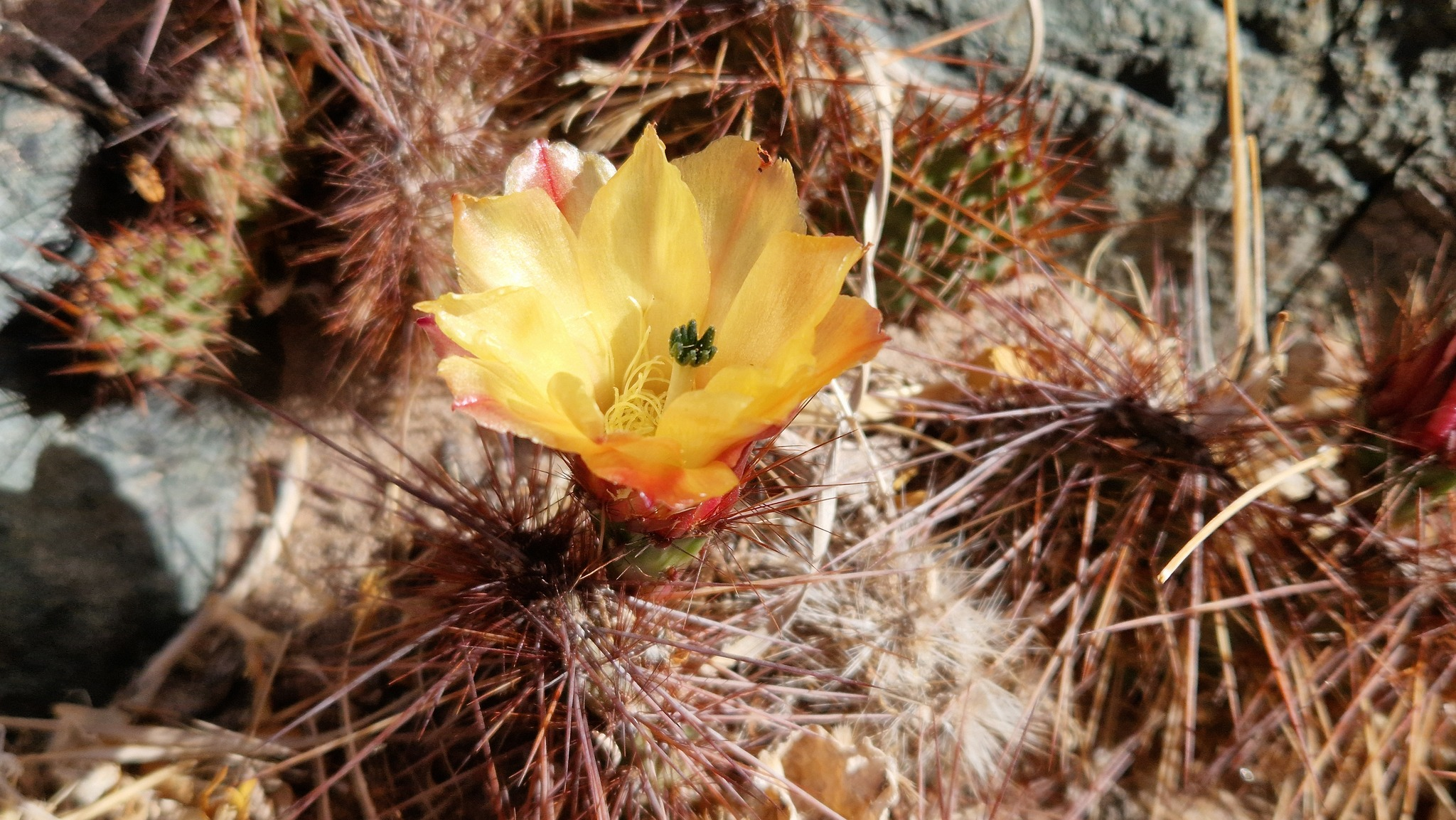

Conservation status
- Least Concern (IUCN 3.1)

Scientific classification
- Kingdom: Plantae
- Clade: Tracheophytes
- Clade: Angiosperms
- Clade: Eudicots
- Order: Caryophyllales
- Family: Cactaceae
- Genus: Airampoa
- Species: A. ayrampo

Binomial name
- Airampoa ayrampo (Haenke) Doweld 2002

Synonyms
- List: Opuntia soehrensii Britton & Rose 1919; Platyopuntia soehrensii (Britton & Rose) F.Ritter 1980; Tephrocactus soehrensii (Britton & Rose) G.D.Rowley 2006; Tunilla soehrensii (Britton & Rose) D.R.Hunt & Iliff 2000; Airampoa boliviensis (Backeb.) Doweld 2002; Airampoa cedergreniana (Backeb.) Doweld 2002; Airampoa chilensis (F.Ritter) Doweld 2002; Airampoa minuscula (Backeb.) Doweld 2002; Airampoa orurensis (Cárdenas) Doweld 2002; Airampoa silvestris (Backeb.) Doweld 2002; Airampoa soehrensii (Britton & Rose) Lodé 2016; Cactus ayrampo Haenke 1809; Opuntia alcerrecensis Iliff 1997; Opuntia ayrampo (Haenke) Mottram 2004; Opuntia boliviensis Backeb. 1936; Opuntia cedergreniana Backeb. 1936; Opuntia minuscula (Backeb.) G.D.Rowley 1958; Opuntia orurensis Cárdenas 1956; Opuntia poecilacantha Backeb. 1962; Opuntia silvestris Backeb. 1932; Platyopuntia chilensis F.Ritter 1980; Platyopuntia orurensis (Cárdenas) F.Ritter 1980; Platyopuntia soehrensii var. grandiflora F.Ritter 1980; Platyopuntia soehrensii var. transiens F.Ritter 1980; Tephrocactus minusculus Backeb. 1936; Tephrocactus silvestris Backeb. 1936; Tunilla chilensis (F.Ritter) D.R.Hunt & Iliff 2000; Tunilla minuscula (Backeb.) D.R.Hunt & Iliff 2000; Tunilla orurensis (Cárdenas) D.R.Hunt & Iliff 2000; Tunilla silvestris (Backeb.) D.R.Hunt & Iliff 2000

= Airampoa ayrampo =

Species of cactus

Airampoa ayrampo (synomym Airampoa soehrensii) is a species of Airampoa found in northwestern Argentina, Bolivia, northern Chile, and Peru.

== Description ==
This low-growing cactus spreads along the ground. Its creeping stems often develop roots at the edges of their segments. The segments are flattened and may be crescent-shaped with slight bumps; more rarely, they are nearly cylindrical. They can grow up to 6 cm long. Each segment has at least 60 closely spaced areoles. Most produce 5–8 needle-like spines, though there may be as few as 2 or as many as 12. The spines vary from thick to bristle-like, point in different directions, and can reach 7 cm long. They are usually yellowish to brown and occur on nearly all the areoles. Flower: The flowers may be yellow, orange, pink, or red and can reach 5.5 cm long. The flower’s outer base (pericarpel) bears areoles almost to its base, with the upper areoles appearing bristle-like. The fruit is dark red and grows up to 2.5 cm long. Its lower portion has no areoles, while the upper portion bears a few spines up to 2 cm long.

== Distribution ==
The species grows mainly in tropical montane habitats at elevations of 3,200–4,000 meters. It occurs in high-altitude scrubland and grassland, growing in sunny areas and taking shelter in the shade of nurse plants.

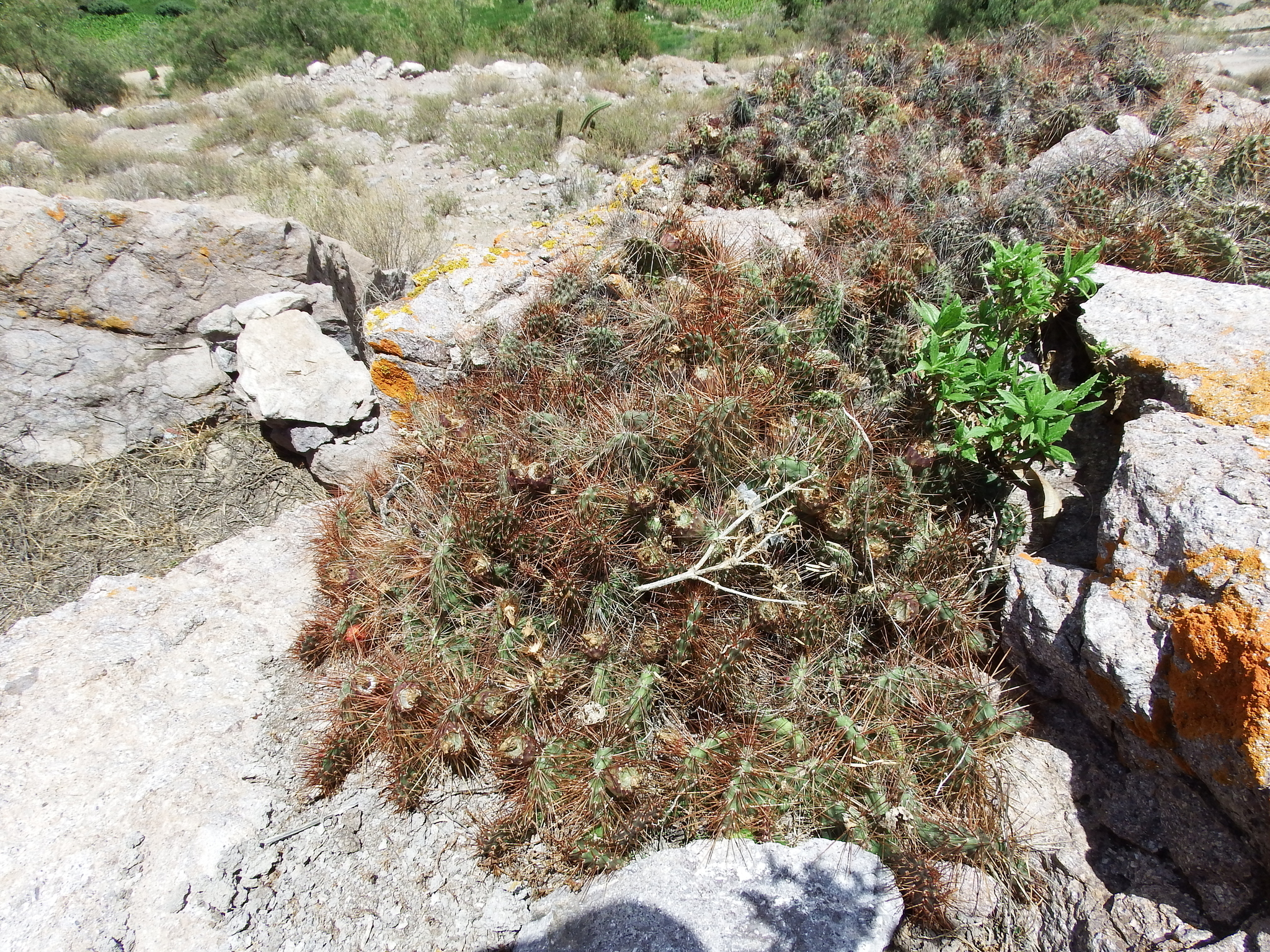
Airampoa ayrampo in Tarata, Peru

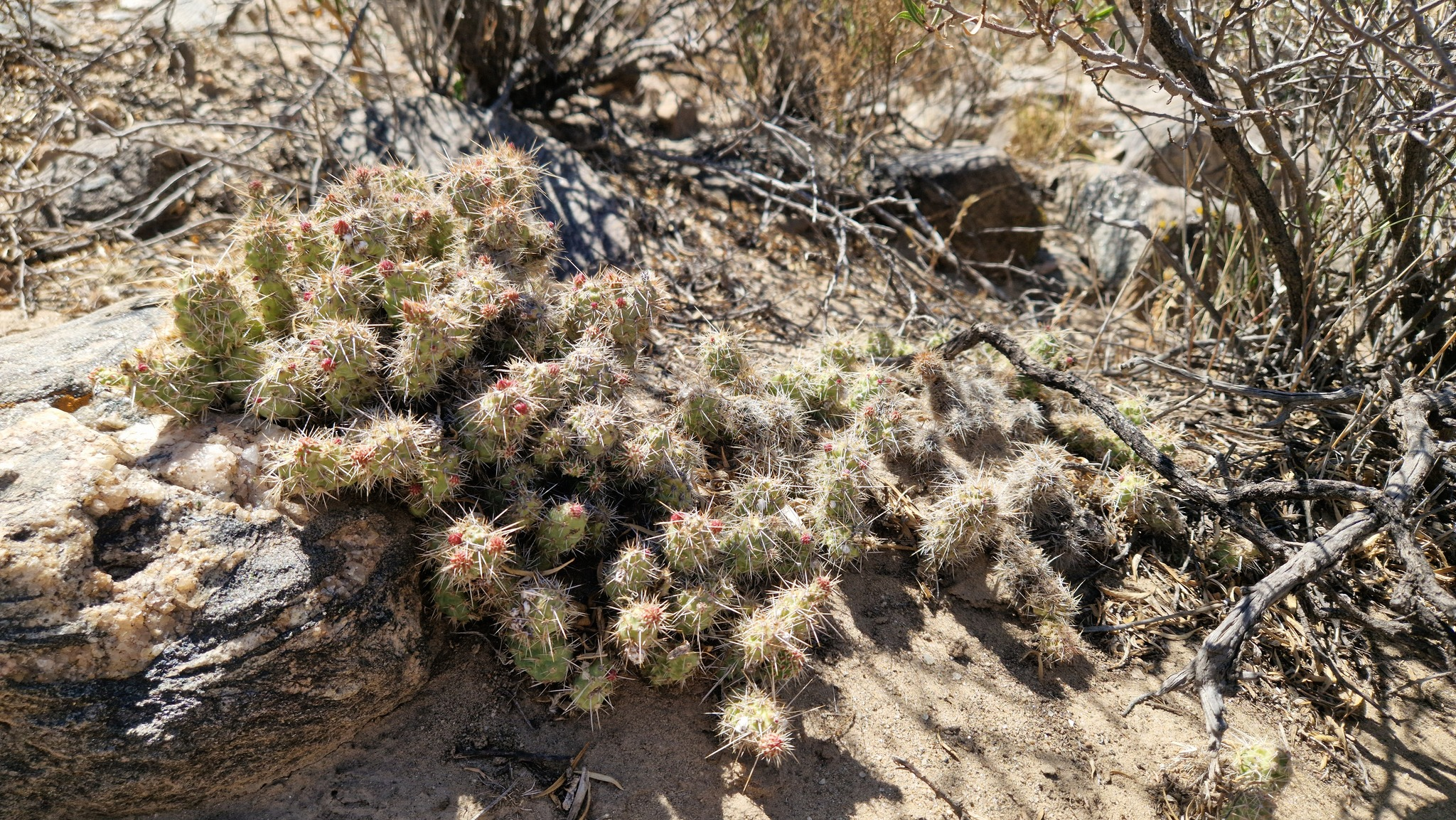
Plant growing in Amaicha del Valle, Tucumán Province, Argentina

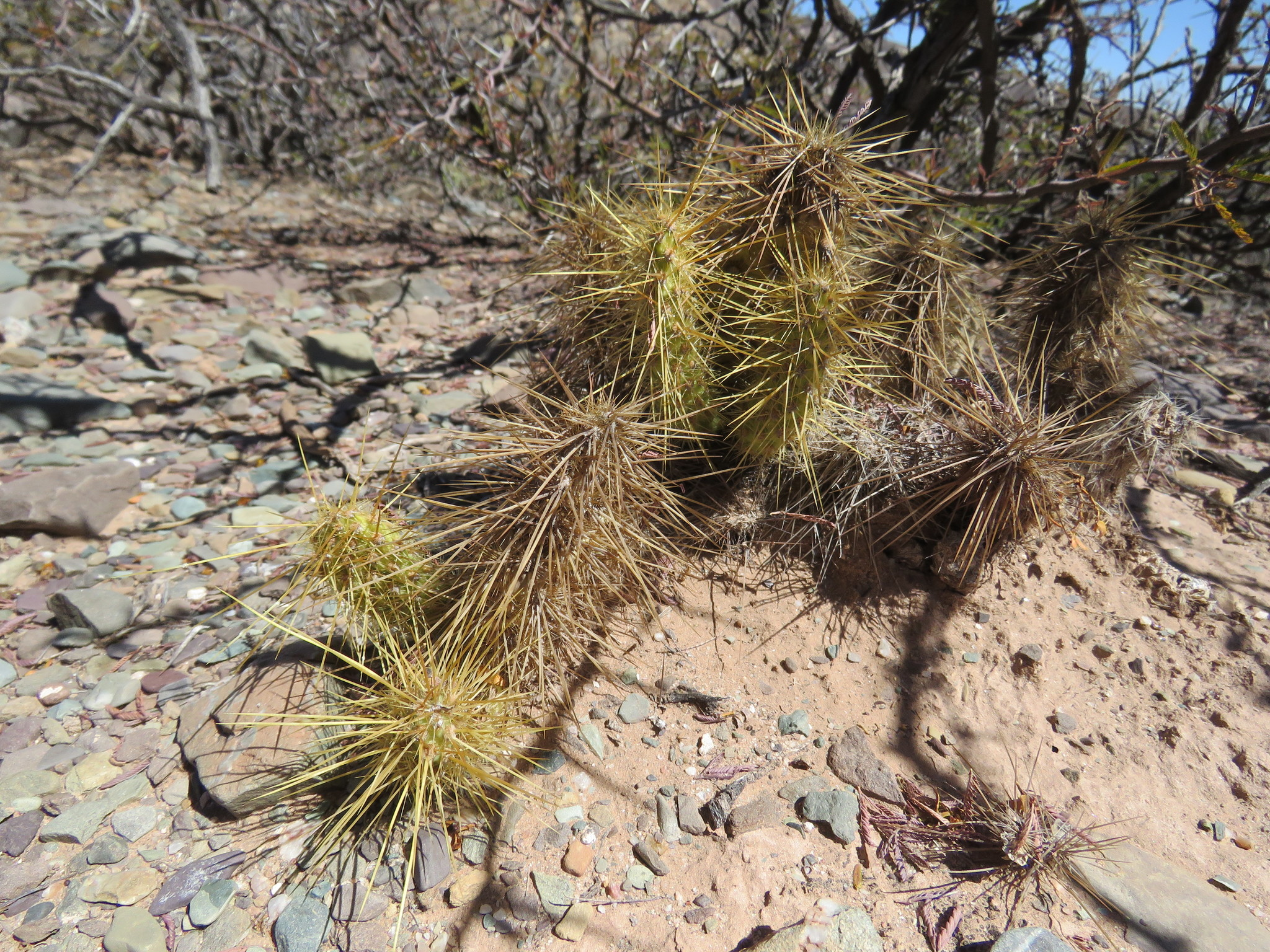
Habitat in Tonco, Salta Province, Argentina

== Taxonomy ==
Thaddäus Haenke first described the species as Cactus ayrampo in 1809, in Voyages dans l'Amérique Méridionale Depuis [1781–1801], volume 2, page 526. The specific epithet comes from the Quechua word ayrampu, the plant’s common name in its native region. In 2002, Aleksandr Doveld transferred the species to the genus Airampoa, publishing the name Airampoa ayrampo in the journal Turczaninowia, volume 5, page 28.
