= National University of Engineering =

Public Peruvian university

Coordinates: 12°01′11″S 77°02′55″W

- Universidad Nacional de Ingeniería
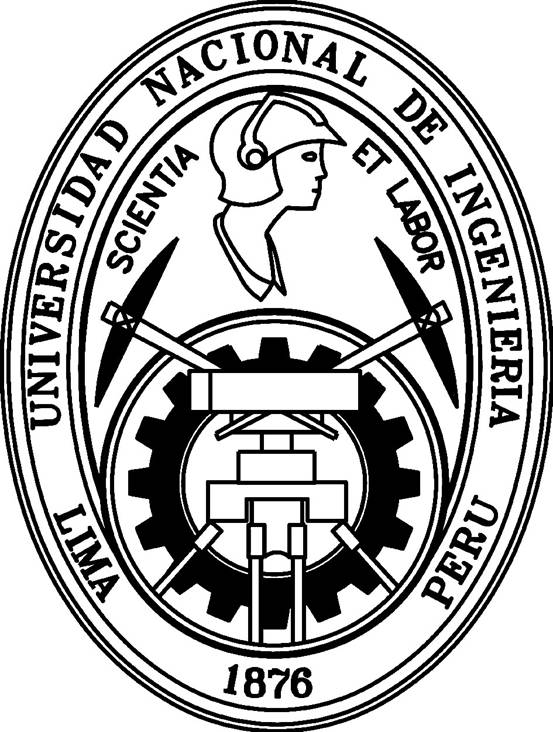
- UNI coat of arms.
- Motto: Scientia et labor
- Motto in English: Knowledge and work
- Type: Public
- Established: March 18, 1876 (150 years ago)
- Founder: Edward Jan Habich
- Affiliations: Alianza Estratégica; Association of National Universities of Peru (AUNAP)
- Rector: Ph.D. Pablo Alfonso López-Chau Nava
- Faculty: 900
- Students: 12,345 (2016)
- Undergraduates: 10,708
- Postgraduates: 1,000
- Location: Av. Túpac Amaru 210, Rímac, Lima, Peru
- Campus: Urban
- Colors: Red
- Website: www.uni.edu.pe

The National University of Engineering (Spanish: Universidad Nacional de Ingeniería, UNI) is a public engineering and science university located in the Rímac District of Lima, Peru. It is considered as one of Peru's most prestigious educational institutions.

== History ==
The National University of Engineering was founded in 1876 by the Polish engineer Edward Jan Habich as the School of Civil Constructions and Mining Engineers (Spanish: Escuela de Ingenieros de Construcciones Civiles y de Minas), but has traditionally been known as School of Engineers (Escuela de Ingenieros). At the time of its foundation, there was a growing demand for engineers in Peru due to the rapid development of mining and communications.

Today, the National University of Engineering is widely regarded as the foremost science and technology-oriented university in Peru, many of its alumni occupying today positions of leadership in the fields of industry, academia, and government.

== Academics ==
Admission is by a competitive entrance examination held twice a year. In the 2025-II process, 5,428 applicants competed for 1,510 places in 32 programs, with civil engineering, systems engineering and architecture drawing the most applications. In 2026-II, more than 5,500 applicants competed for 1,400 places.

== Notable alumni and professors ==
Among former renowned professors and students are:

Politicians:

- Francisco Sagasti, President of Peru (2020–2021), former Planning manager at the World Bank, Former President of the Consultive Council of Science and Technology for Development in the United Nations, visiting professor of the Wharton School of Business at University of Pennsylvania.
- Martin Vizcarra Cornejo, President of Peru (2018–2020).
- Manuel Prado Ugarteche, President of Peru (1939–1945) and (1956–1962)
- Federico Villarreal, scientist, engineer and politician.
- Fernando Belaúnde Terry (Professor), architect, former President of Peru (1963–1968, 1980–5).
- Humberto Lay, politician.
- Salomón Lerner Ghitis, prime minister.

Business, Science and Arts:

- Alberto Benavides de la Quintana. Founder of Buenaventura Mining Company. Peruvian Billionaire. Mining Engineering, Class of 1941. Masters in Geology from Harvard University, Class of 1944.
- Miguel De La Torre Sobrevilla, founder and CEO of Geoservice Ingeniería. Former president of the board of directors of International Geosynthetics Society (IGS) in Peru.
- Barton Zwiebach Cantor, string theorist, author of "A First Course in String Theory" and professor of physics at the Massachusetts Institute of Technology. He also was awarded with the MIT School of Science 2003 Teaching Prize for Excellence in Undergraduate Education.
- Modesto Montoya, nuclear physicist and former president of the Peruvian Institute of Nuclear Energy.
- Fernando de Szyszlo, painter, sculptor, printmaker, and teacher.
- Gustavo Mohme, Civil engineer, politician and journalist.

== Organization ==
The UNI is divided into eleven colleges which contain twenty-seven academic schools. It is a university polarized around science, engineering, and architecture. It offers a wide range of engineering specialties, including traditional industrial, mechanical, civil, electronics, chemical, and systems engineering, as well as other specialized majors such as economics, textile and naval engineering.

School	Department
Architecture, Urbanism and Arts Department	Architecture
Science Department	Physics
Science Department	Mathematics
Science Department	Chemistry
Science Department	Engineering Physics
Science Department	Computer Science
Environmental Engineering Department	Sanitary Engineering
Environmental Engineering Department	Hygiene and Industrial Safety Engineering
Environmental Engineering Department	Environmental Engineering
Civil Engineering Department	Civil Engineering
Economics Engineering and Social Sciences Department	Economics Engineering
Economics Engineering and Social Sciences Department	Statistics Engineering
Electrical and Electronic Engineering Department	Electrical Engineering
Electrical and Electronic Engineering Department	Electronics Engineering
Electrical and Electronic Engineering Department	Telecommunications Engineering
Mining and Metallurgical Engineering Department	Geological Engineering
Mining and Metallurgical Engineering Department	Metallurgical Engineering
Mining and Metallurgical Engineering Department	Mining Engineering
Industrial and Systems Engineering Department	Industrial Engineering
Industrial and Systems Engineering Department	Systems Engineering
Mechanical Engineering Department	Mechanical Engineering
Mechanical Engineering Department	Mechanic-Electrical Engineering
Mechanical Engineering Department	Naval Engineering
Mechanical Engineering Department	Mechatronics Engineering
Petroleum Engineering and Natural Gas Department	Petroleum Engineering
Petroleum Engineering and Natural Gas Department	Petro-chemical Engineering
Chemical and Textile Engineering Department	Chemical Engineering
Chemical and Textile Engineering Department	Textile Engineering
