= Peruvian Institute of Nuclear Energy =

Government research institute of Peru

- Instituto Peruano de Energía Nuclear
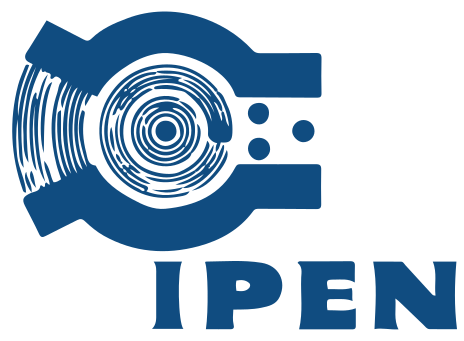

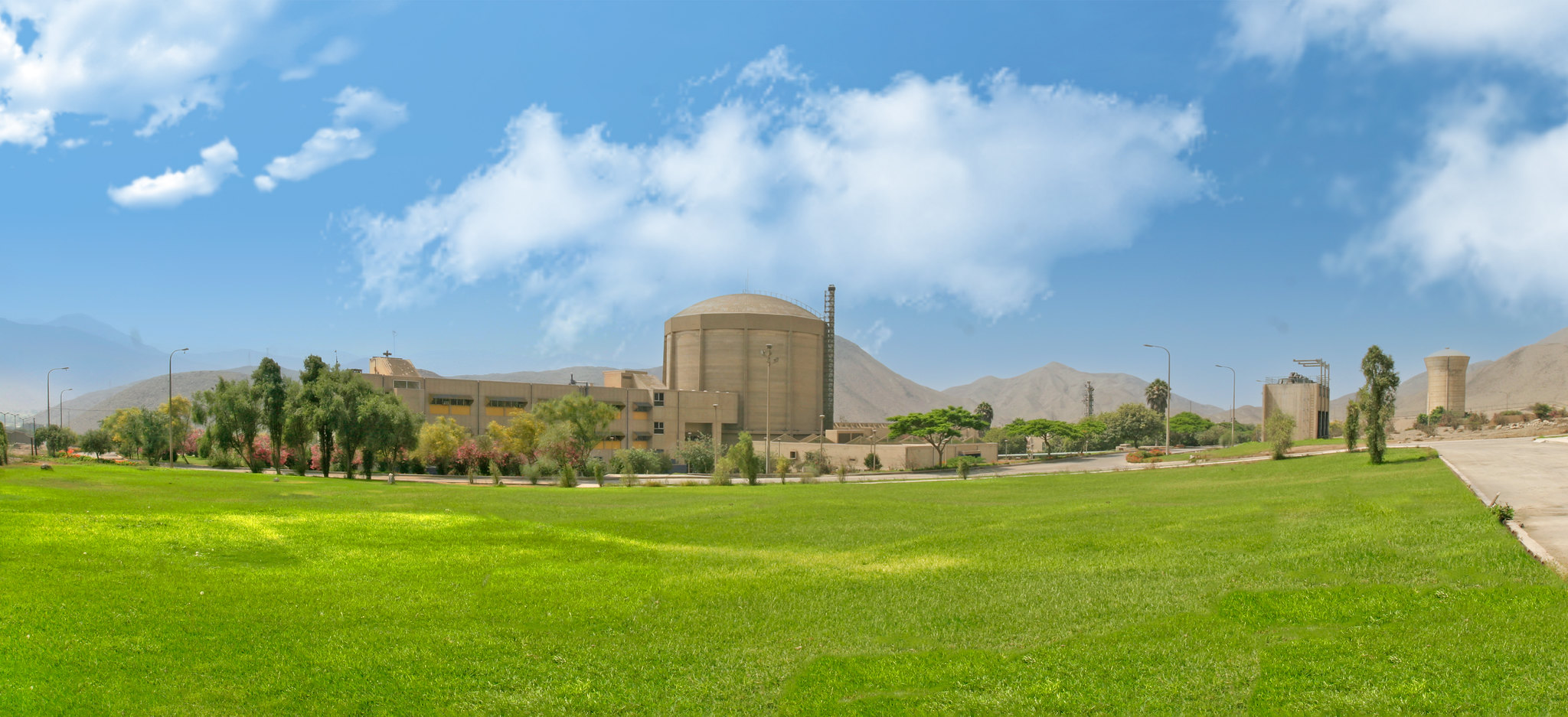
- Nuclear reactor in Huarangal

Institute overview
- Formed: February 4, 1975
- Type: Research institute
- Headquarters: Canadá 1480, San Borja
- Institute executive: Rolando Páucar Jáuregui, President
- Parent Ministry: Energy and Mines
- Website: gob.pe/ipen

The Peruvian Institute of Nuclear Energy (Spanish: Instituto Peruano de Energía Nuclear; IPEN) is a Nuclear research institute of the Ministry of Energy and Mines of Peru. Established in 1975, it operates a nuclear centre in Huarangal.

== History ==
The institute was created through Law Decree No. 21,094 of February 4, 1975. The following year, it presented—alongside other government entities—a nuclear plan for the country, whose initial phase planned for the construction of a nuclear reactor to be used for training purposes, and a research complex with a 10-megawatt reactor. In 1997, a cooperation agreement was signed with Argentina. Another agreement was signed on November 5, through which both countries aimed to build the Nuclear Research Centre of Peru (Centro de Investigaciones Nucleares del Perú; CINP) and its 10 MW reactor. The Argentine government would train its Peruvian counterpart in every aspect of the project, which cost approximately US$ 106 million.

On July 20, 1978, at 04:30, RP-0 (Reactor Peruano de Potencia Cero)—the institute's first reactor—was brought into critical condition. The same was achieved on November 30, 1988, with reactor RP-10, designed and built by Argentina's National Atomic Energy Commission alongside INVAP. The RP-10 acts as a source of neutron rays. This event marked a historical milestone for science and technology in the region and the beginning of the use of the benefits of nuclear energy in Peru.

== Organisation ==
The institute operates two research centres in Lima and functions under the authority of the Ministry of Energy and Mines. It is headed by a president.

=== List of presidents ===
| Name | Term | |
| Name | Start | End |
|---|---|---|
| Jorge Sarmiento Calmet | 1954 | 1963 |
| Enrique Monge Gordillo | September 23, 1963 | July 1, 1966 |
| Javier Correa Miller | July 8, 1966 | October 17, 1968 |
| Marcial Rubio Escudero | October 17, 1968 | July 7, 1972 |
| Marco Fernández-Baca Carrasco | July 7, 1972 | June 9, 1975 |
| Carlos Quevedo Farfán | June 9, 1975 | March 11, 1976 |
| Hernán Romero Accinelli | March 11, 1976 | December 31, 1976 |
| Juan Barreda Delgado | January 22, 1977 | January 16, 1986 |
| Guillermo Flores Pinedo | January 16, 1986 | January 5, 1988 |
| Víctor La Torre Aguilar | February 22, 1988 | January 24, 1989 |
| Jorge Bravo Cabrejos | January 24, 1989 | March 17, 1989 |
| Cristóbal Miletich Souza-Peixoto | March 17, 1989 | August 17, 1990 |
| José Dellepiane Massa | August 17, 1990 | November 5, 1992 |
| Luis Gamarra Elías | July 11, 1994 | July 18, 1996 |
| Jorge Du Bois Gervasi | July 10, 1996 | May 30, 2000 |
| Jesús Aymar Alejos | March 2001 | April 2001 |
| Ángel Manuel Castro Baca | April 26, 2001 | August 23, 2001 |
| Modesto Montoya Zavaleta | August 23, 2001 | December 26, 2006 |
| Conrado Seminario Arce | December 26, 2006 | May 11, 2009 |
| Carlos Barreda Tamayo | May 12, 2009 | July 16, 2013 |
| Susana Margarita Petrick Casagrande | July 19, 2013 | August 27, 2021 |
| Heriberto Abraham Sánchez Córdova | March 18, 2022 | February 17, 2023 |
| Mario César Mallaupoma Gutiérrez | February 18, 2023 | June 12, 2024 |
| Rolando Páucar Jáuregui | June 12, 2024 | Incumbent |

=== Services ===
The services provided by the institute are varied, with an emphasis on the health sector. One of its main contributions is the production of radioisotopes, which are transformed into radiopharmaceuticals used in the diagnosis and treatment of various oncological diseases. One such product is Iodine-131, used in the treatment of thyroid cancer, and Technetium-99m, widely used in diagnostic imaging studies for the early detection of neoplasms. These were joined by Samarium-153, used to treat pain associated with bone metastases, and Iridium-192, intended for brachytherapy procedures, whose distribution was established in coordination with the Peruvian Society of Radiotherapy.

At RACSO, one of two research centres, the irradiation of agricultural products with gamma rays is being developed, aimed at extending the shelf life of food by reducing bacterial load, eliminating fungi and inhibiting sprouting in tubers and bulbs. Irradiation with Cobalt-60 and Cesium-137 sources is also carried out and applied to seeds of Andean crops, such as kiwicha, quinoa and barley, with the purpose of increasing their resistance to pests, adverse climatic conditions and water scarcity.

=== Research centres ===
The institute operates two research centres: Oscar Miró Quesada de la Guerra Nuclear Centre (RACSO) and the Multipurpose Irradiation Plant (PIMU).

==== RACSO ====
Oscar Miró Quesada de la Guerra Nuclear Centre (Centro Nuclear Oscar Miró Quesada de la Guerra; RACSO) is the institute's main centre, located at Huarangal, Lima, and named after Óscar Miró Quesada de la Guerra. Inaugurated in the 1980s, it hosts reactor RP-10 and laboratories for radiopharmaceuticals. A 2013 study documented operational incidents at the RP-10 research reactor using the International Nuclear and Radiological Event Scale (INES). Ten events were recorded, primarily related to electrical failures, cooling system problems, and spurious signals in the detectors, all of which were resolved through immediate corrective measures. The analysis concluded that none of the events had radiological consequences or compromised safety barriers, classifying them at level 0 of the INES scale, meaning "below the scale" or of no significance to safety. This confirmed the effectiveness of the protection systems and the proper operational management of the RP-10.

==== PIMU ====
The Multipurpose Irradiation Plant (Planta de Irradiación Multiusos; PIMU) was acquired in 1995 to apply ionizing radiation to food, medical products, and industrial materials. It is a facility equipped with cobalt-60 sources, designed for sterilization, disinfection, and preservation processes, with the capacity to treat various volumes of material according to international radiological safety standards. Its operation allows for extending the shelf life of agri-food products, ensuring sanitary safety and supporting the export of fruits, vegetables and other perishable goods, in addition to contributing to the sterilization of medical and pharmaceutical supplies.

== See also ==
- Ministry of Energy and Mines (Peru)
