= Training Centre for Science and Technology =

The Training Centre for Science and Technology (Spanish: Centro de Preparación para la Ciencia y Tecnologia; CEPRECYT) is an institution for promoting science and technology in Peruvian society, whose objective is to encourage children and students to follow careers in science and technology and to promote science and technology applications.

== International conferences ==
CEPRECYT founded and co-organizes international science events including the International Meeting for Science and Technology (ECI), the International Course on Science and Technology for science teachers (CICTA), the International Scientific Seminar, the "Fiesta de la Ciencia", and workshops and seminars of science teaching.
