= Negresco (disambiguation) =

Negresco is a Brazilian sandwich cookie brand.

Negresco may also refer to:

- A variant of the Romanian surname Negrescu
- Henri Negresco (1870–1920), Romanian hotelier
- Hotel Negresco, Nice, France
- Negresco (film), a 1968 West German film
