= Negrescu =

The Romanian-language surname Negrescu is derived from the word negru, "black".

The surname may refer to:

- Alexandru Negrescu, birth name of Henri Negresco, Romanian hotelier, founder of the Hotel Negresco in France
- Igor Negrescu, Moldavian professional football manager and former footballer
- Ion Negrescu, Romanian politician
- Gheorghe Negrescu (1887–1977), Romanian general, a pioneer of Romanian aviation
- Pedro Negrescu (1969–2021), Romanian jazz double bassist and classical music conductor
- Radu Negrescu-Suțu, Romanian writer and anti-Communist militant
- William Pierpont Black, born Wilhelm Peter Negrescu, was a New Zealand wood carver, journal editor and publisher, journalist

== See also ==
- Negoescu
- Negresco
