= Théâtre des Capucines =

Coordinates: 48.8699°N 2.3292°E

- Théâtre Isola (1892-1897); Théâtre-Musée des Capucines (1993-present)
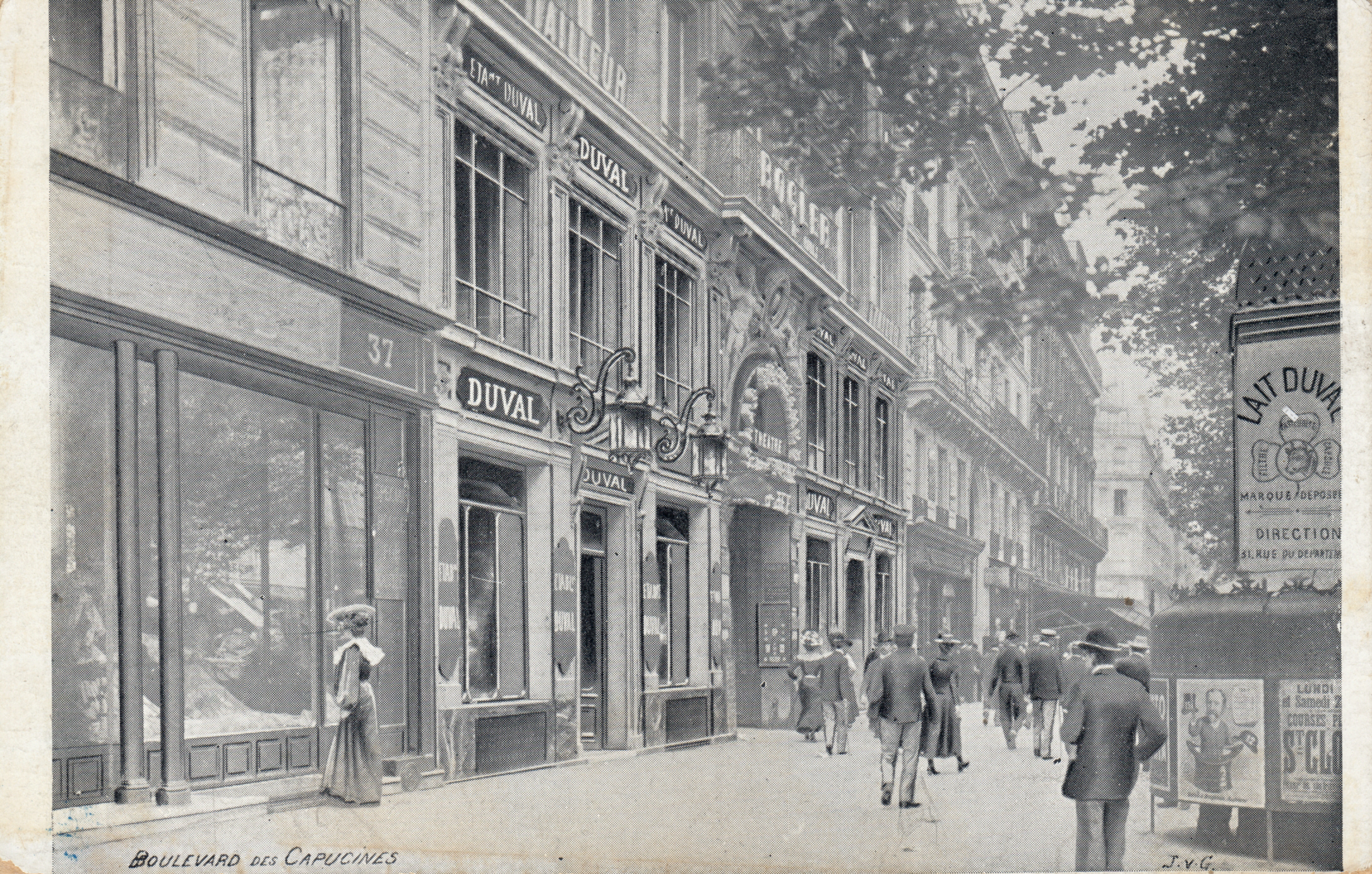
- Interactive map of Théâtre des Capucines
- Address: 39 Boulevard des Capucines; Paris

Construction
- Opened: 1889
- Architect: Édouard Niermans

The Théâtre des Capucines was a theatre on the boulevard des Capucines in the 2nd arrondissement of Paris. Built in 1889 by architect Édouard-Jean Niermans, it was taken over by two brothers, Émile Isola and Vincent Isola, in 1892 to become the Théâtre Isola. They managed the theatre until 1897.

Berthez Armand was an early director and the actress-dancer Gaby Deslys (1881-1920) appeared there. The actress, singer and film star Arletty made her debut there in October 1919 and performed there regularly for ten years, especially in operettas. It was also the venue of the 1943 musical comedy Une femme par jour, (with music by Georges Van Parys and text by Pierre Véber and Jean Boyer). Serge Gainsbourg inaugurated a series of popular concerts at the theatre in 1963, including an appearance by the singer Barbara.

The theatre finally closed in 1970 and was taken over by the perfume company Fragonard. Fragonard preserved the building as a perfume museum, the Théâtre-Musée des Capucines, which they established in 1993.

== Premières ==
- 1899: L'ami de la maison by Pierre Veber, comedy in one act, 17 January 1899
- 1900: Blancheton père et fils by Pierre Veber, one-act fantasia, 26 October 1900
- 1904: Rose Mousse, by Lecocq, comédie musicale in one act, 28 January 1904
- 1905: La salutiste, by Lecocq, opéra monologue in one act, 14 January 1905
- 1928: Yes, by Maurice Yvain and Albert Willemetz, operetta in three acts, 26 January 26 1928
- 1943: Une femme par jour, comedy by Georges Van Parys
- 1954: Les chansons de Bilitis, operetta by Joseph Kosma

== See also ==
- Théâtre-Musée des Capucines
