= Édouard Niermans =

Édouard Niermans may refer to:

- Édouard Niermans (director) (born 1943), French film director, screenwriter and actor
- Édouard Niermans (architect) (1859–1928), French architect of Dutch origins
