= Musée du Parfum =

Museum of perfume in Paris, France

Coordinates: 48°52′17″N 2°19′49″E

- Musée du Parfum Fragonard

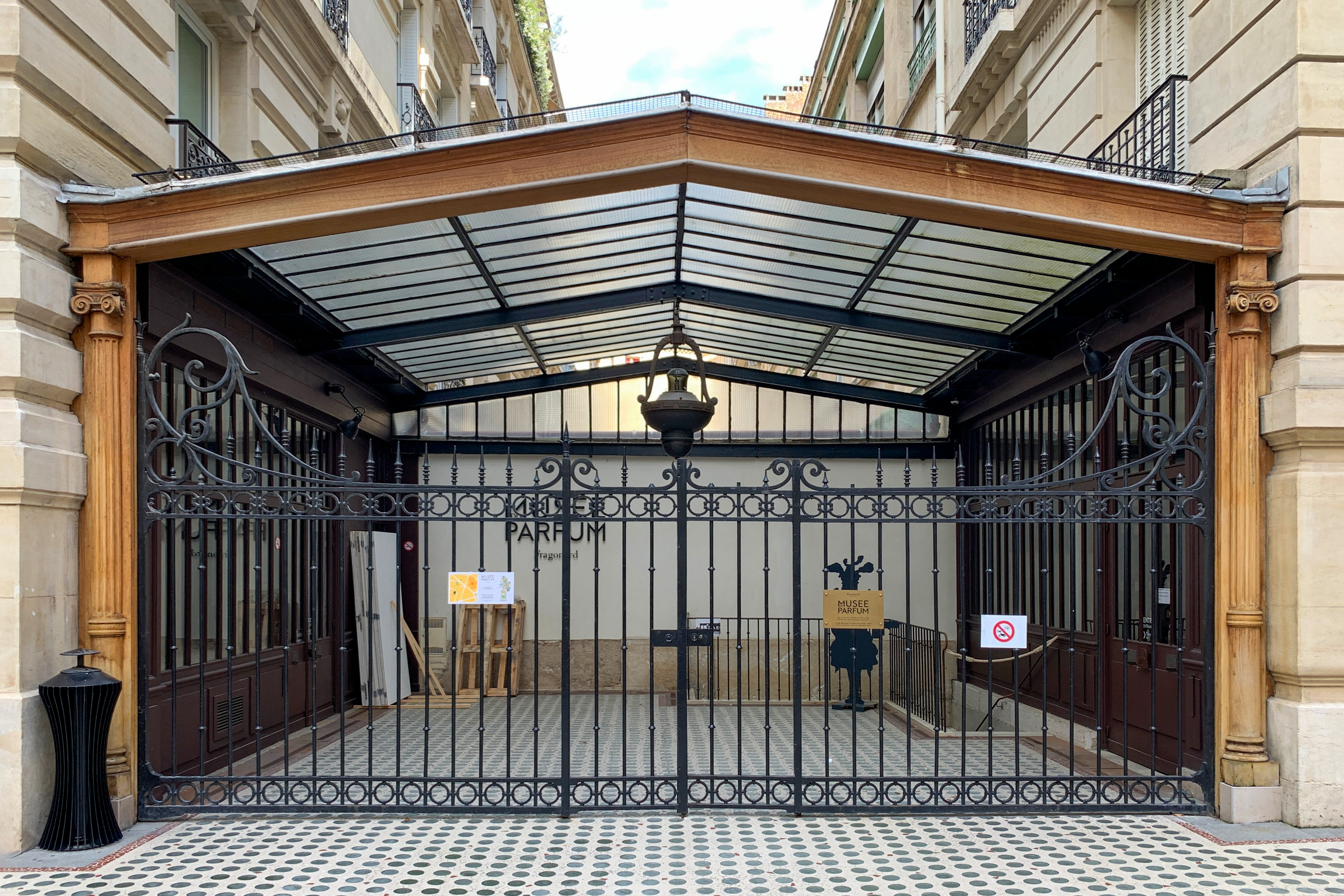
- Established: 1983
- Location: 9 rue Scribe, 75009 Paris, France
- Type: Perfume museum
- Founder: Fragonard Parfumeur
- Owner: Fragonard Parfumeur
- Public transit access: Opéra (Métro)
- Website: musee-parfum-paris.fragonard.com

The Musée du Parfum (French pronunciation: [myze dy paʁfœ̃]), also known as the Fragonard Musée du Parfum ([fʁaɡɔnaʁ myze dy paʁfœ̃]), is a French private museum of perfume located at 9 rue Scribe, in the 9th arrondissement of Paris.

== History and exhibits ==
Fragonard Parfumeur established the museum in 1983, within a Napoleon III town-house built in 1860. Its rooms contain period furnishings and perfume exhibits, including antique perfume bottles, containers, toiletry sets, and stills for steam distillation of perfume extracts. Displays show how perfumes are made today and present the history of perfume manufacturing and packaging. A perfume organ on display has tiers of ingredient bottles arranged around a balance used to mix fragrances.

In 2014, the Fragonard company acquired ownership of the real estate site located at the address of the Square de l'Opéra.

== See also ==
- Théâtre-Musée des Capucines, another Fragonard perfume museum in Paris
- List of museums in Paris
