= 2013 in public domain =

This is a list of works that entered the public domain in part of the world in 2013.

== Entering the public domain in Europe ==
A work enters the public domain in most European countries (with the exception of Belarus) 70 years after the creator's death, if it was published during the author's lifetime.

=== Authors ===
- Robert Musil
- Stefan Zweig
- Neel Doff
- Tatu Vaaskivi
- Artturi Järviluoma
- Bruno Schulz
- Edwin Vincent Odle
- Anthony M. Rud
- Frank L. Packard
- Terézia Vansová
- Ernest Bramah
- Violet Hunt
- Peadar Toner Mac Fhionnlaoich
- Lucy Maud Montgomery

=== Scholars and journalists ===
- Léon Daudet
- Edith Stein
- Franz Boas
- Peadar Toner Mac Fhionnlaoich
- Bronislaw Malinowski
- Janusz Korczak
- William Pierpont Black
- Ludvig Lubbe Nordström
- Francis Younghusband
- A. E. Waite

=== Music ===
- Francis Bousquet
- Wilhelm Peterson-Berger
- Jean Gilbert
- "Love Me Do", by The Beatles

=== Art ===
- Walter Sickert
- Ramon Casas i Carbó
- Eric Ravilious
- Grant Wood

== Brazil ==
- Xavier Marques

== Entering the public domain in the United States ==
The Copyright Term Extension Act means works never registered or published before January 1, 1978, and whose authors died before 1943 entered the public domain in this jurisdiction on January 1, 2013. Other works would not enter the public domain here until 2019.

== Worldwide ==
Nina Paley decided to donate her 2008 film Sita Sings the Blues to the public domain.

== See also ==
- 1942 in literature, 1952 in literature, 1962 in literature and 1972 in literature
- List of countries' copyright lengths
- Public Domain Day
- Creative Commons
- Public Domain
- Over 300 public domain authors available in Wikisource (any language), with descriptions from Wikidata
