= Church of Notre-Dame du Port =

Church in Nice, France

Church of Notre-Dame-du-Port
- Church of the Immaculate Conception
- Église Notre-Dame-du-Port de Nice
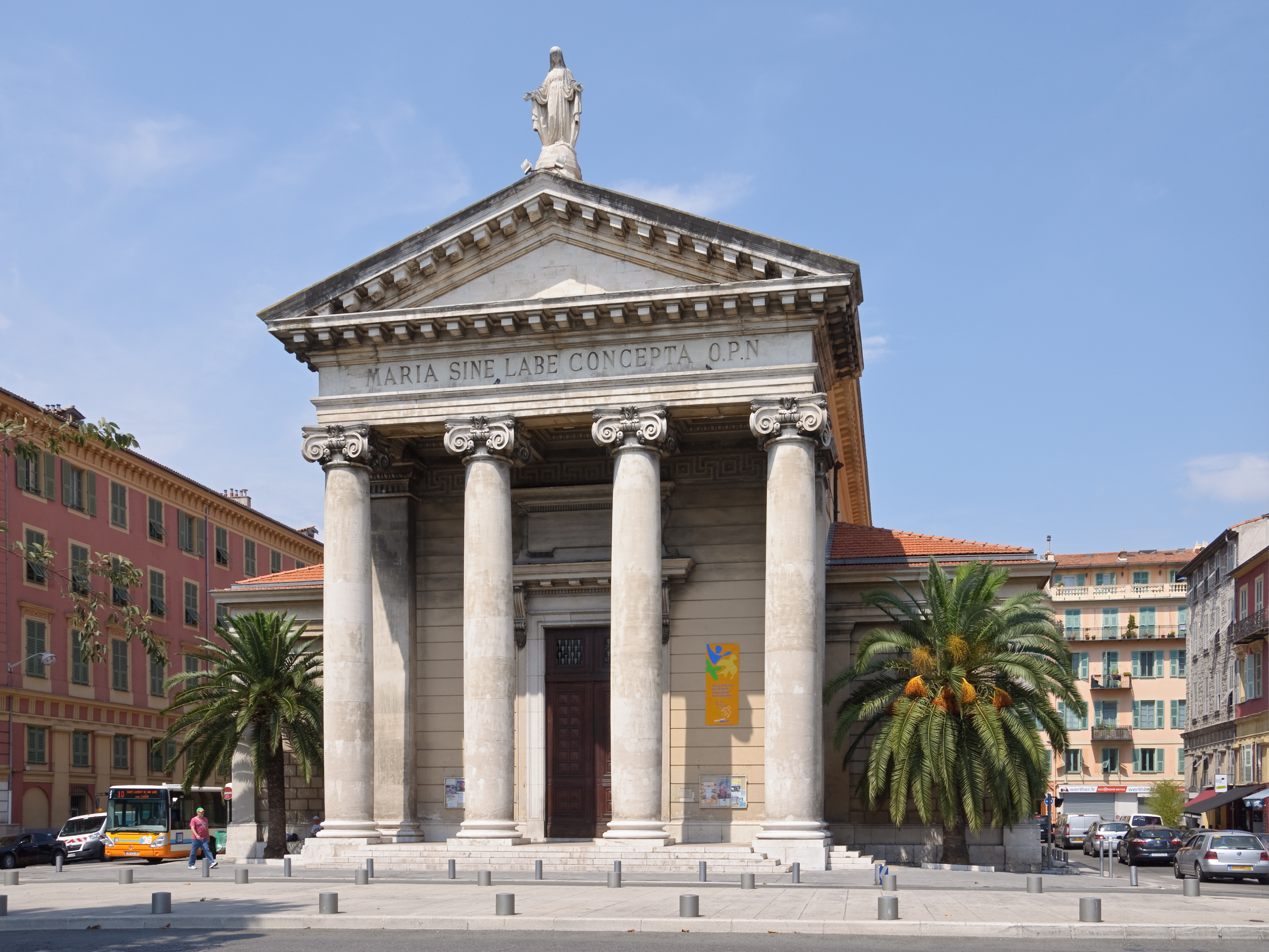
- Church of Notre-Dame-du-Port
- 43.698908°N 7.285242°E
- Location: Nice, Alpes-Maritimes
- Country: France
- Denomination: Roman Catholic

History
- Dedication: Immaculate Conception

Architecture
- Heritage designation: Monument historique
- Designated: 1991
- Architect(s): Joseph Vernier, Jules Fèbvre
- Completed: 1853

Administration
- Diocese: Diocese of Nice

The Church of Notre-Dame du Port (French: Église Notre-Dame-du-Port de Nice) (also called the Church of the Immaculate Conception; French: Église de l'Immaculée Conception) is a neo-classical church, inaugurated in 1853 in the Port Lympia district of Nice, facing the baie des Anges. The church has been listed as a monument historique since 1991, as part of the architectural ensemble built in the 19th century on Place Île-de-Beauté. It was listed as a UNESCO World Heritage Site of Nice in 2021.

== History ==
The construction of the church, on the road to the sea, was decided by a letters patent from the King of Sardinia and Duke of Savoy Charles-Félixon February 15, 1830.

The church ceiling collapsed during the bombing of the port during the Battle of Nice and its liberation in 1944. It was rebuilt with reinforced concrete during the 1950s.

The restoration of the façade was inaugurated on 13 July 2023, following nearly a year and a half of interior and exterior works, at a reported cost of €1.9 million. The city-facing façade of the church was restored to its original ochre colour, while the white sea-facing façade with its columns, which had been renovated in 2014, was left unchanged.
