= Théâtre Marigny =

Theatre in Paris, France

- Panorama Marigny (1883–1894)
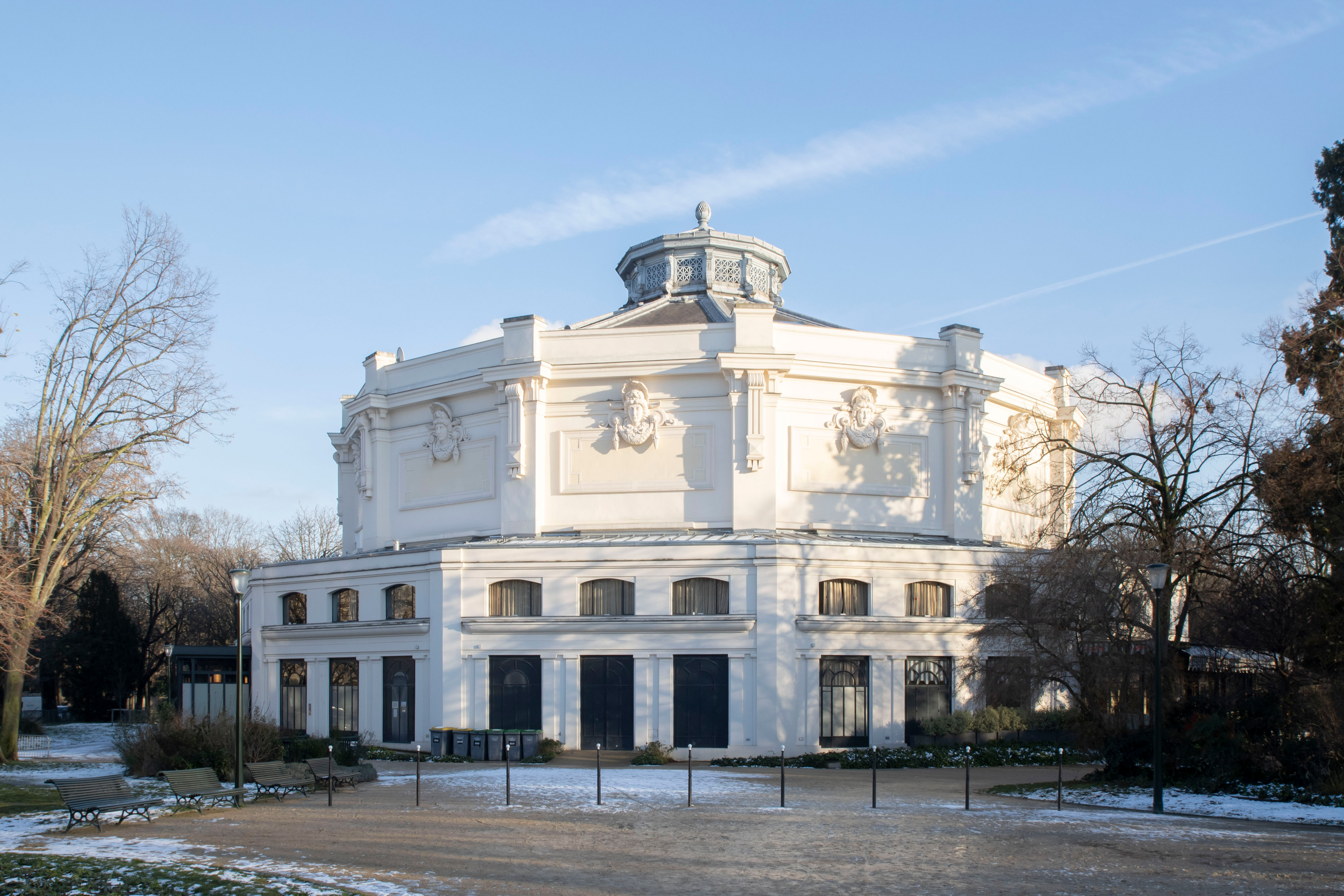
- Théâtre Marigny from the gardens
- Interactive map of Théâtre Marigny
- Address: located at the corner of Avenue des Champs-Elysées and Avenue Marigny, 8th arrondissement of Paris
- Coordinates: 48.868631°N 2.313669°E
- Owner: Groupe Artémis
- Operator: Laurence Pinault, President; Pierre Lescure, General Director
- Capacity: 1,024 (main hall); 311 (Popescu salon)

Construction
- Opened: 1894
- Architects: Charles Garnier (panorama); Édouard Niermans (theatre)

Website
- www.theatremarigny.fr

The Théâtre Marigny (French pronunciation: [teɑtʁ maʁiɲi]) is a theatre in Paris, situated near the junction of the Champs-Élysées and the Avenue Marigny in the 8th arrondissement.

It was originally built to designs of the architect Charles Garnier for the display of a panorama, which opened in 1883. The panorama was converted to the Théâtre Marigny in 1894 by the architect Édouard Niermans and became a home to operetta and other musical theatre.

== Panorama ==
An earlier theatre on the site, the Salle Lacaze, became known in 1855, as the home of Jacques Offenbach's Théâtre des Bouffes-Parisiens, where he first built his reputation as a theatre composer. In 1864 this became the Théâtre des Folies-Marigny, which was demolished in 1881, giving way to a panorama built by Charles Garnier. In 1885, dioramas on Paris through the ages by Theodor Josef Hubert Hoffbauer (1839–1922), and on Jerusalem on the day of the death of Christ, by Olivier Pichat, were displayed.

== Theatre ==
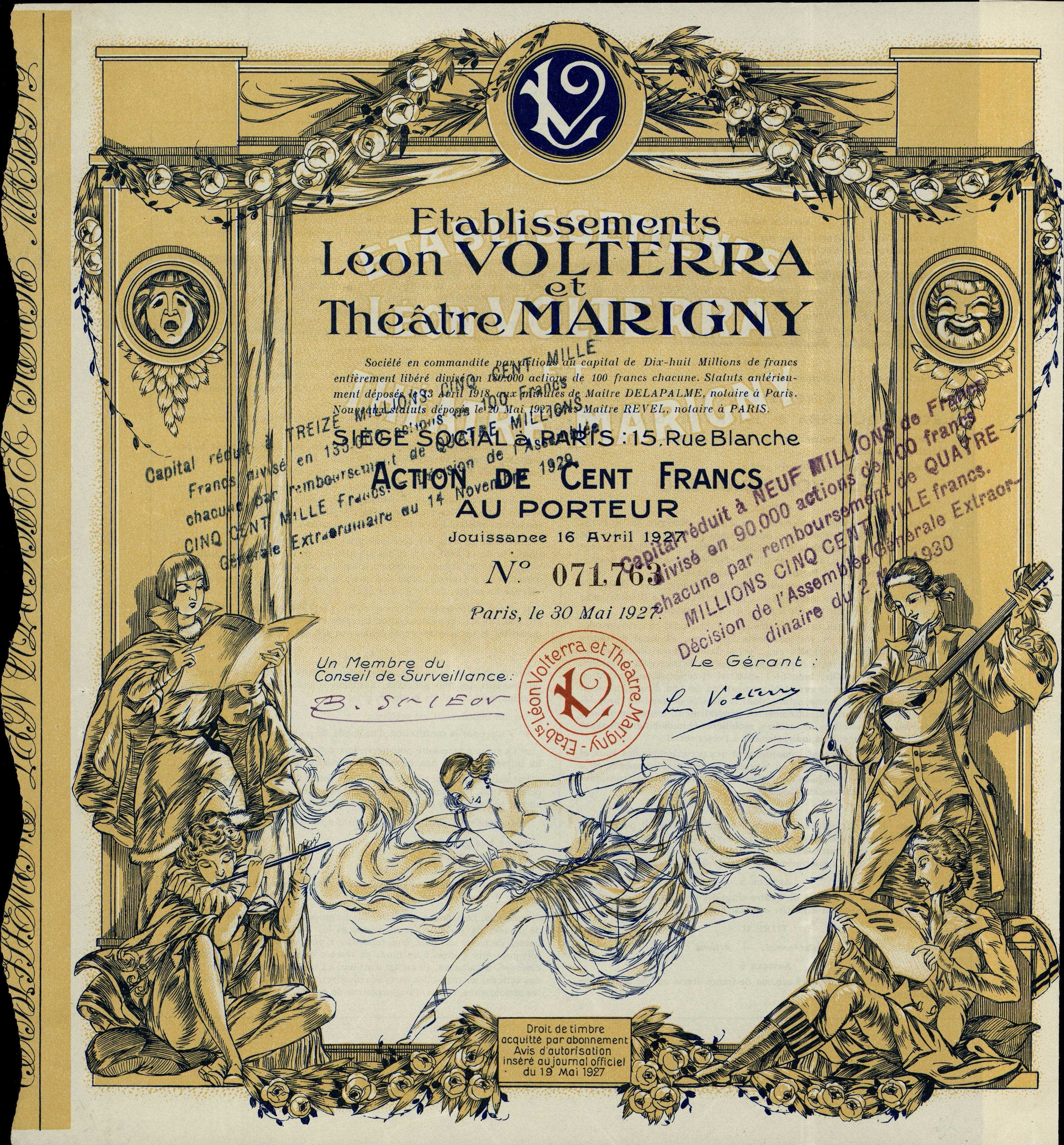
Share of the Etablissements Léon Volterra et Théâtre Marigny, issued 30 may 1927

In 1894, Édouard Niermans converted the venue into a theatre-in-the-round for summer musical spectacles. The hall was enlarged and modernized in 1925 by Volterra, and in that form opened with a revival of Monsieur Beaucaire by André Messager. This success led the management to devote the venue mainly to operetta and other musical theatre until the 1930s. Thereafter the Marigny mounted boulevard shows and revivals (such as Jacques Offenbach's La Créole by in 1936).

In 1946 the Théâtre Marigny welcomed a troupe from the Comédie-Française to form the Renaud-Barrault company, and in 1954, Barrault opened a smaller "Petit Marigny". The Grenier-Hussenot troupe followed and later the hall became a cinema. In 1965 the direction passed to Elvira Popescu; in 1978 she was succeeded by John Bodson.

In 2000 the theatre was acquired by the Artemis Group, owned by François Pinault, who asked Robert Hossein to take over the theatre's direction. In 2008 Hossein retired and was replaced by Pierre Lescure. On 28 September 2006 Pinault and his wife put the entire facility at the disposal of the Brigitte Bardot Foundation for its 20th anniversary celebration.

== Musical theatre repertory ==
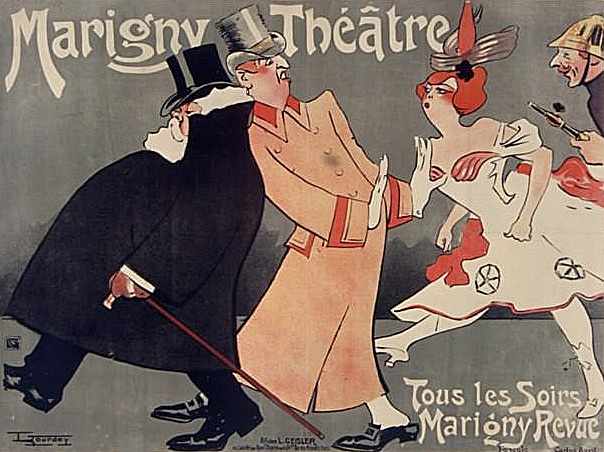
Poster from Maurice Lefebvre-Lourdet for the Théâtre Marigny (1906)

- J'te veux (12 February 1923)
- Monsieur Beaucaire (20 November 1925)
- Venise by Tiarko Richepin (25 June 1927)
- Le diable à Paris by Marcel Lattes (27 October 1927) (with Raimu, Edmée Favart)
- Coups de roulis by Messager (29 September 1928)
- Boulard et ses filles by Charles Cuvillier (8 November 1929)
- Madame Pompadour by Leo Fall (16 May 1930) (with René Hérent, Robert Burnier)
- Moineau by Louis Beydts (13 March 1931)
- La belle saison by Jean Delettre (29 June 1937) (with Lucienne Boyer)
- Mes amours by Oscar Strauss (2 May 1940)
- Un violon sur le toit (8 November 1969) (with Ivan Rebroff and Maria Murano)
