= Saint Reparata =

Christian virgin martyr (died 3rd century)

Saint Reparata of Caesarea
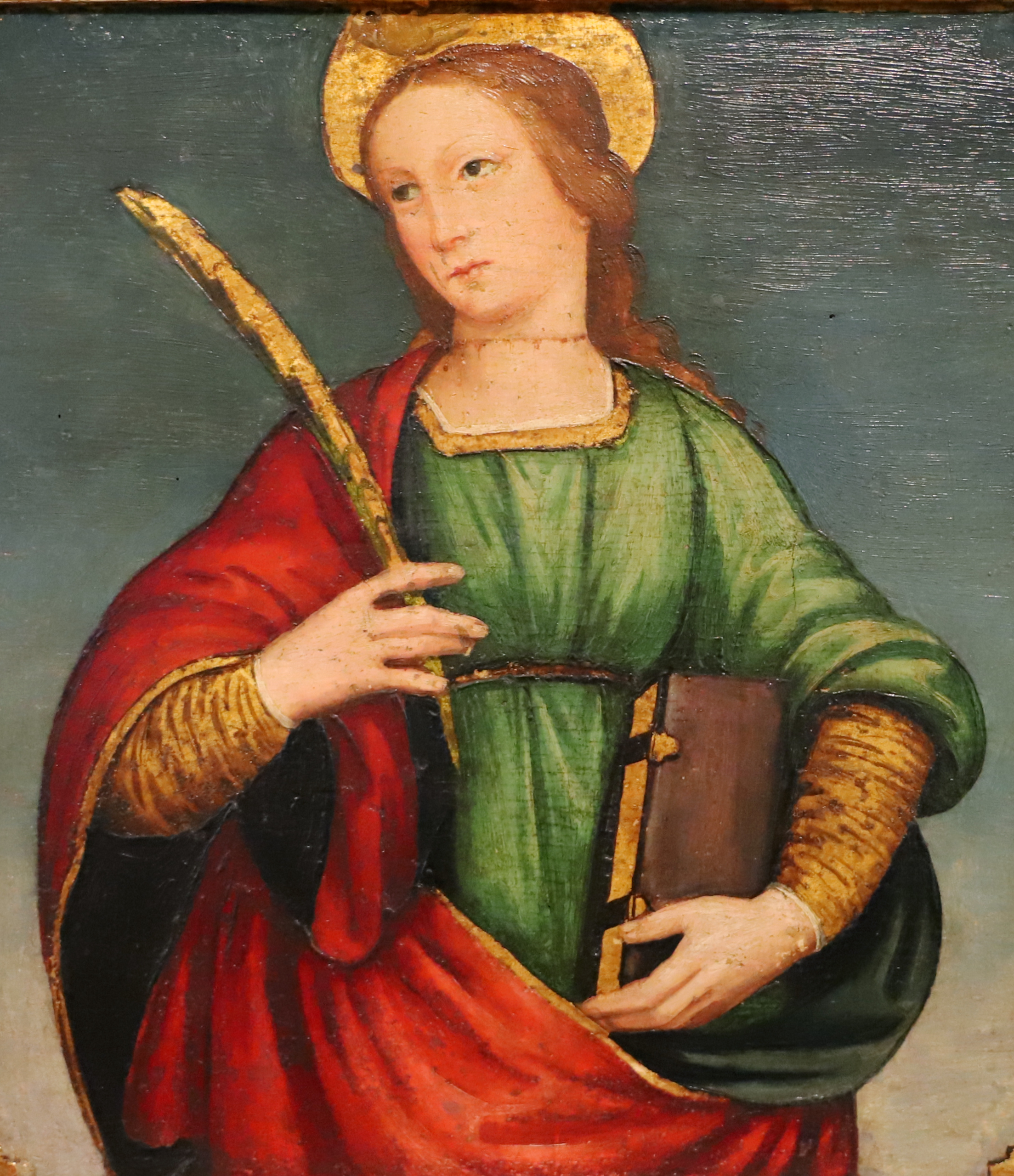

Virgin and martyr
- Born: Caesarea Maritima, Palestine
- Died: 3rd century AD
- Venerated in: Roman Catholic Church
- Feast: 8 October
- Attributes: crown, martyr's palm; dove; banner with a red cross on a white field; accompanied by St. Ansanus
- Patronage: Nice, France; Florence, Italy

Reparata (Italian: Santa Reparata, French: Sainte Réparate) was, according to tradition, a third-century virgin who was martyred for her Christian faith in her hometown of Caesarea, Roman Province of Palestine, and later canonised by the Catholic Church.

== Initial legend and evolution ==
Sources record her age as being between 11 and 20 years old, with Sainte-Réparate Cathedrale in Nice placing it as 15. She was arrested for her faith and tortured during the persecution of Roman emperor Decius (r. 249–251).

Her persecutors tried to burn her alive, but she was saved by a shower of rain. She was then compelled to drink boiling pitch. When she again refused to apostatize, she was decapitated. Her legend states that immediately upon dying a dove appeared to symbolize the departure of her spirit therefrom to Heaven.

Later elaborations of her legend state that her body was laid in a boat and blown by the breath of angels to the bay presently denominated the "Baie des Anges" in Nice. A similar tale is associated with the legends of Restituta; Devota, patroness of Monaco and Corsica; and Torpes of Pisa.

== Historicity ==
Evidence of her cult does not exist before the ninth century, when her name appeared in the martyrology of Bede. Eusebius of Caesarea (c. 260/265–339), who recorded the martyrdoms that occurred in the Holy Land during the third century, did not reference her.

== Spread, depiction, and local significance ==
Her cult became widespread in Europe during the Middle Ages, as evidenced by the multiple Passiones in various parts of the continent, especially in Italy, where her cult was especially popular, specifically in Florence, Atri, Naples, and Chieti. Numerous painters depicted her, including Fra Bartolomeo, Arnolfo di Cambio, Andrea Pisano, Domenico Passignano, and Bernardo Daddi.

She remained primary patroness of Florence until the High Middle Ages; Anna Jameson writes that circa "1298 she appears to have been deposed from her dignity as sole patroness; the city was placed under the immediate tutelage of the Virgin and St. John the Baptist."

She is the patroness of Nice and a co-patroness of Florence (with Zenobius of Florence). The former Cathedral of Santa Reparata in Florence was dedicated in honor of her.

Florence celebrates her feast annually on 8 October, in commemoration of its deliverance from the Ostrogoths led by Radagaisus in AD 406, which it attributes to her intercession.
