= Théâtre-Musée des Capucines =

Museum of perfume in Paris, France

Coordinates: 48°52′11.5″N 2°19′45″E

The Théâtre-Musée des Capucines, also known as the Théâtre musée des Capucines-Fragonard, is a private museum dedicated to perfume, and located in the 2nd arrondissement of Paris at 39, boulevard des Capucines, Paris, France. It closes on Sundays; admission is free.

The museum was created in 1993 by the Fragonard perfume company within a former theater, the Théâtre des Capucines, dating to 1889. It exhibits 19th-century copper distilling apparatus, alembics, flasks, pot-pourris, and perfume roasters, as well as the animals and plants that provide raw materials for perfumes. A collection of perfume bottles illustrates 3000 years of perfume making.

== See also ==
- Musée du Parfum, another Fragonard perfume museum in Paris
- List of museums in Paris
