= Bay of Pont-Mahé =

Bay in France

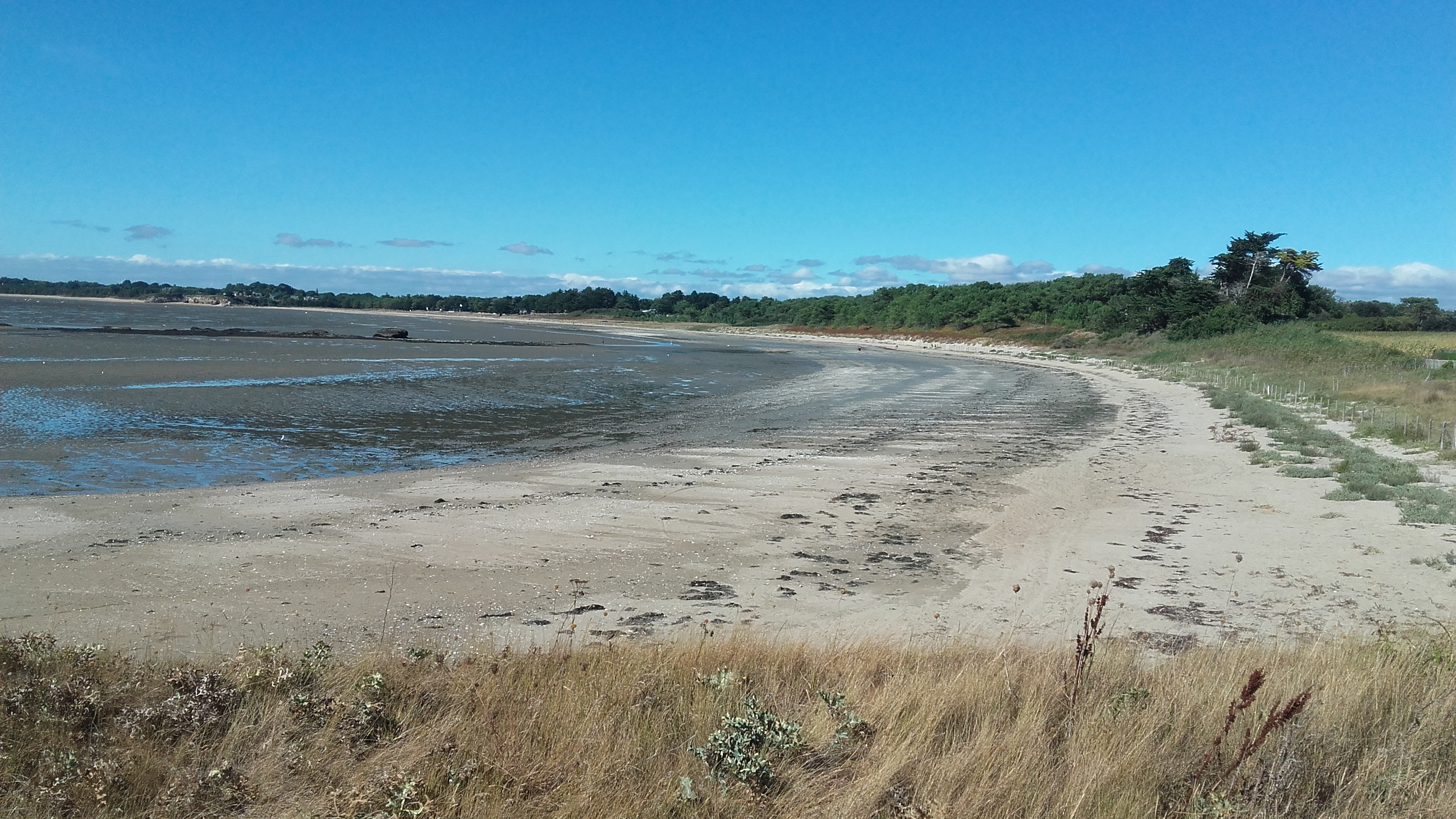
- Bay of Pont-Mahé
- Coordinates: 47°26′20″N 2°27′45″W
- Type: Bay
- Part of: Gulf of Gascony

Bay of Pont-Mahé (French: Baie de Pont-Mahé; Breton: Bae Pont-Mahe) is a bay in the Atlantic Ocean which extends opposite the communes of Assérac in Pays de la Loire and Pénestin in Brittany, France.

== Geography ==
Pont-Mahé Bay is located on the coast of the departments of Loire-Atlantique and Morbihan to the immediate north of the mouth of Marais du Mès. It is limited to the west by the Pointe du Bile, in the commune of Pénestin, and to the east by Pointe de Pen-Bé in Assérac, the two places being two kilometres apart as the crow flies.

The bay opens towards the Atlantic Ocean in a southwest direction. At low tide, it is over 1 km long.

== Ranking ==
The bay of Pont-Mahé is included on the list of protected natural sites in Natura 2000 together with the Marais du Mès, the Pont de Fer pond and Île Dumet.

== See also ==
- List of bays of France
