= List of bays of France =

Following is a list of bays, coves and roadsteads in France.

== Bays in Metropolitan France ==
English name	French name	Region	Nearest town	Coordinates
Aliso Cove	Anse d'Aliso	Corsica	Morsiglia	42°55′29″N 9°21′00″E
Angels' Bay	Baie des Anges	Provence-Alpes-Côte d'Azur	Nice	43°36′33″N 7°15′12″E
Baie de Bandol	Baie de Bandol	Provence-Alpes-Côte d'Azur	Bandol	43°10′15″N 5°30′41″E
Basque Roads	Rade des Basques	Nouvelle-Aquitaine	Île-d'Aix	46°00′45″N 1°12′07″W
Bay of Biscay	Golfe de Gascogne	Brittany; Pays de la Loire; Nouvelle-Aquitaine; (in France)	Point Penmarc'h (in France)	45°31′22″N 3°11′48″W
Bay of the Dead	Baie des Trépassés	Brittany	Plogoff	48°02′48″N 4°43′12″W
Bonne Anse Bay	Baie de Bonne Anse	Nouvelle-Aquitaine	Les Mathes	45°41′09″N 1°12′37″W
Bourgneuf Bay	Baie de Bourgneuf	Pays de la Loire	Bouin	47°02′13″N 2°08′19″W
Brest Roadstead	Rade de Brest	Brittany	Brest	48°20′01″N 4°28′45″W
Camaret Bay	Anse de Camaret	Brittany	Camaret-sur-Mer	48°17′27″N 4°35′24″W
Cassis Bay	Baie de Cassis	Provence-Alpes-Côte d'Azur	Cassis	43°12′31″N 5°31′56″E
Cavalaire Bay	Baie de Cavalaire	Provence-Alpes-Côte d'Azur	La Croix-Valmer	43°11′01″N 6°34′10″E
La Ciotat Bay	Baie de la Ciotat	Provence-Alpes-Côte d'Azur	La Ciotat	43°09′59″N 5°38′29″E
Douarnenez Bay	Baie de Douarnenez	Brittany	Douarnenez	48°10′12″N 4°26′30″W
Écalgrain Bay	Baie d'Écalgrain	Normandy	La Hague	49°41′30″N 1°56′43″W
La Forêt Bay	Baie de La Forêt	Brittany	Fouesnant; Concarneau	47°52′00″N 3°58′00″W
Hyères Roadstead	Rade d'Hyères	Provence-Alpes-Côte d'Azur	Île du Levant	43°00′30″N 6°22′53″E
Landermer Cove	Anse de Landemer	Normandy	Montfarville	49°38′54″N 1°14′29″W
Lazaret Bay	Baie du Lazaret	Provence-Alpes-Côte d'Azur	La Seyne-sur-Mer	43°05′09″N 5°54′20″E
Lorient Roadstead	Rade de Lorient	Brittany	Lorient	47°43′50″N 3°21′15″W
Mont-Saint-Michel Bay	Baie du Mont-Saint-Michel	Normandy	Mont-Saint-Michel	48°39′23″N 1°39′58″W
Paulilles Cove	Anse de Paulilles	Provence-Alpes-Côte d'Azur	Port-Vendres	42°30′08″N 3°07′30″E
Paraguano	Baie de Paraguan	Corsica	Bonifacio	41°23′52″N 9°07′46″E
Piantarella Bay	Baie de Piantarella	Corsica	Bonifacio	41°22′29″N 9°13′17″E
Pont-Mahé Bay	Baie de Pont-Mahé	Brittany	Assérac	47°26′26″N 2°27′47″W
Pride of Ars	Fier d'Ars	Nouvelle-Aquitaine	Loix	46°13′12″N 1°29′12″W
Quiberon Bay	Baie de Quiberon	Brittany	Quiberon	47°30′37″N 3°01′08″W
Rondinara Bay	Baie de Rondinara	Corsica	Bonifacio	41°28′12″N 9°16′09″E
Sablettes Bay	Anse de Sablettes	Provence-Alpes-Côte d'Azur	La Seyne-sur-Mer	43°04′33″N 5°53′26″E
Saint-Cyprien Bay	Baie de Saint-Cyprien	Corsica	Lecci	41°38′07″N 9°21′16″E
Saint-Jean-de-Luz Bay	Baie de Saint-Jean-de-Luz	Nouvelle-Aquitaine	Saint-Jean-de-Luz	43°23′38″N 1°40′24″W
Sanary Bay	Baie de Sanary	Provence-Alpes-Côte d'Azur	Sanary-sur-Mer	43°06′28″N 5°48′08″E
Seine Bay	Baie de Seine	Normandy	Cotentin Peninsula to Le Havre	49°28′12″N 0°46′05″W
Somme Bay	Baie de Somme	Hauts-de-France	Saint-Valery-sur-Somme	50°12′03″N 1°37′30″E
Tocquebœuf Bay	Baie de Tocquebœuf	Normandy	Fermanville	49°42′14″N 1°26′01″W
Toulon Roadstead	Rade de Toulon	Provence-Alpes-Côte d'Azur	Toulon	43°06′28″N 5°54′51″E
Txingudi Bay	Baie de Chingoudy	Nouvelle-Aquitaine	Hendaye	43°21′53″N 1°46′47″W
Veys Bay	Baie des Veys	Normandy	Sainte-Marie-du-Mont	49°22′53″N 1°08′50″W

== Bays in Overseas France ==
English name	French name	Region	Nearest town	Coordinates
Acoua Bay	Baie d'Acoua	Mayotte	Acoua	12°44′00″S 45°02′29″E
Atuona Bay	Baie d'Atuona	French Polynesia	Hiva-Oa	9°48′32″S 139°02′27″W
Bambo Cove	Anse Bambo	Mayotte	Bandrélé	12°55′47″S 45°11′10″E
Comptroller Bay	Baie du Contrôleur	French Polynesia	Nuku Hiva	8°54′25″S 140°02′20″W
Cook's Bay	Baie de Cook	French Polynesia	Mo'orea	17°29′44″S 149°49′52″W
Fort-de-France Bay	Baie de Fort-de-France	Martinique	Fort-de-France	14°34′11″N 61°04′59″W
Galion Bay	Baie du Galion	Martinique	La Trinité	14°44′18″N 60°55′28″W
Goro Bay	Baie de Goro	New Caledonia	Goro	22°18′19″S 167°01′48″E
Great Sea Dead-end	Grand cul-de-sac marin	Guadeloupe	Sainte-Rose	16°19′32″N 61°35′36″W
Matavai Bay	Baie de Matavai	French Polynesia	Mahina	17°29′57″S 149°29′41″W
Opunohu Bay	Baie d'Ōpūnohu	French Polynesia	Mo'orea	17°30′07″S 149°51′25″W
Sailor's Dead-end	Cul-de-sac du Marin	Martinique	Le Marin	14°27′55″N 60°52′21″W
Saints' Bay	Baie des Saintes	Guadeloupe	Terre-de-Haut	15°52′10″N 61°35′20″W
Small Sea Dead-end	Petit Cul-de-sac Marin	Guadeloupe	Baie-Mahault	16°12′27″N 61°34′08″W
Ta'a 'Oa (Bay of Traitors)	Ta'a 'Oa (Baie des Traîtres)	French Polynesia	Hiva-Oa	9°49′34″S 139°02′16″W
