= Perfume organ =

Device described in 1913 by Septimus Piesse

The perfume organ, also called an octophone (unrelated to the mandola-related octophone), was an instrument invented by the French chemist Septimus Piesse, in which the keys of a piano activated one of 46 different odors.

In 1857, in his book The Art of Perfumery, Piesse used music to describe how notes and smells can work together: "There is, as it were, an octave of odors like an octave in music; certain odors coincide, like the keys of an instrument."

As Sadakichi Hartmann noted in 1913, the keys of the octophone "are complementary and can be combined to harmonies as sounds to a musical chord. It is a valuable guide on a quasi scientific basis for the manufacturers of perfumery, for it is only necessary to strike a chord on the piano, and to know what odors the respective notes of the chord represent, to arrive at the suggestion for some new bouquet." Hartmann was skeptical of the value of the perfume organ for "aesthetical" experiments, as "the affinity between sounds and odors is purely speculative".

In 1922 the magazine Science and Invention had an article on a new, silent, take on the perfume organ. Instead of attempting harmony of music and scent, the keys on the keyboard of the Science and Invention version played only notes of perfume. There does not appear to be any evidence that this particular smell organ was ever constructed.
