= Édouard Niermans (architect) =

French architect

Édouard-Jean Niermans
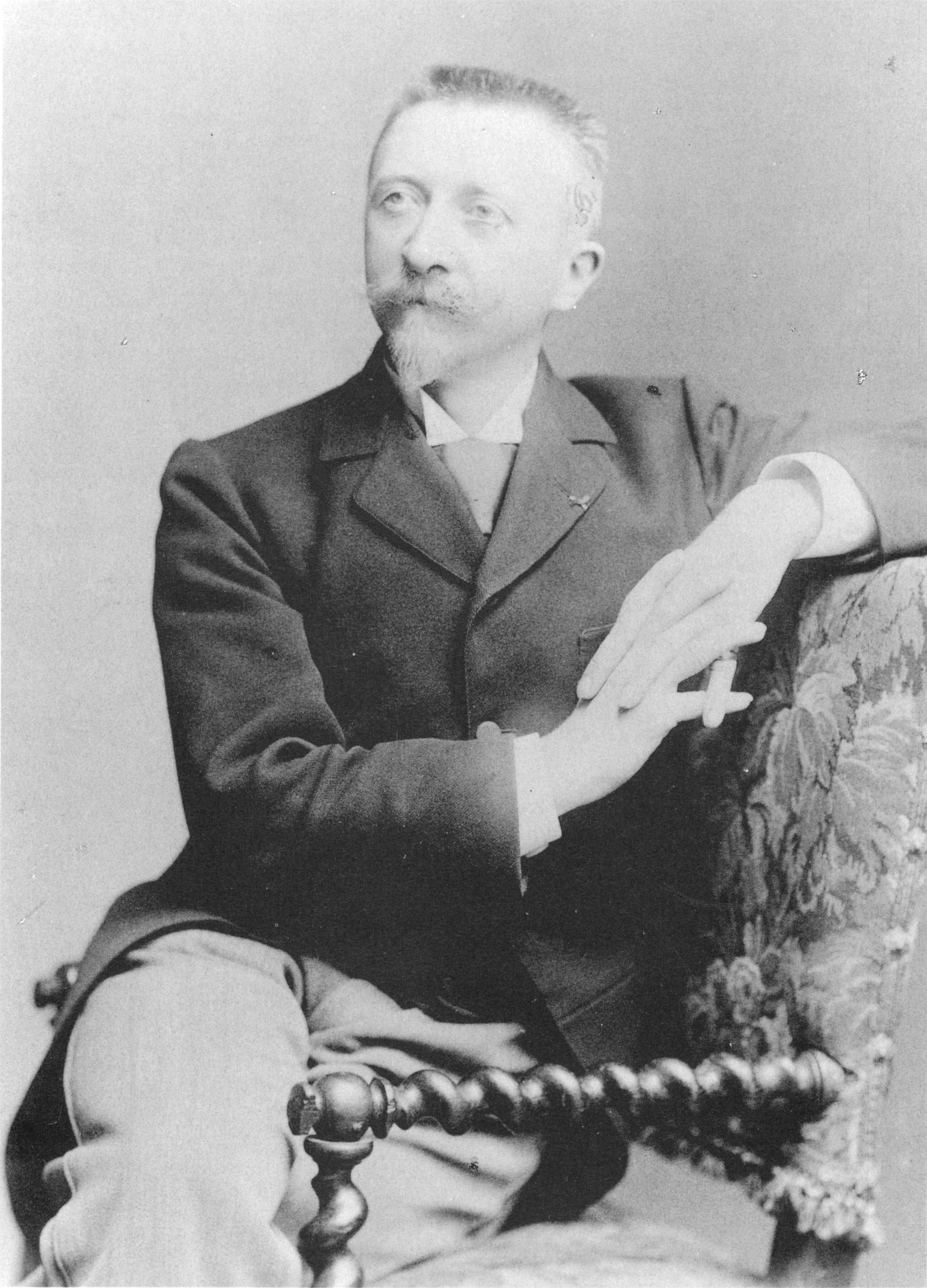
- Édouard-Jean Niermans in 1895 by Pierre Petit
- Born: Eduard Johan Niermans; 30 May 1859; Enschede, Netherlands
- Died: 19 October 1928 (aged 69); Montlaur, Aude, France
- Known for: Moulin Rouge; Théâtre des Capucines; Hôtel Negresco

Édouard-Jean Niermans (born Eduard Johan Niermans) (30 May 1859 – 19 October 1928) was a famous Dutch-born French architect during the Belle Époque.

== Early career ==
Eduard Johan Niermans was born on 30 May 1859 in Enschede, son of the architect Gerrit Doorwaard Niermans (1807-1871) and his fourth wife, Johanna Margaretha Sangster (1817-1869). He was the youngest of their four children. He studied at the Polytechnic School in Delft, earning his diploma in 1883. Having a taste for French culture, (Note: Niermans was once called "a Parisian born in Holland by an error of nature.") he moved to 41 quai d'Anjou in Paris, where he tried to gain recognition at first as a designer of furniture and interior decorations. As a member of the Dutch community in Paris he was chosen to build the Dutch pavilion at the Exposition Universelle (1889) in collaboration with nl:Christiaan Posthumus Meyjes sr. He was awarded the Legion of Honor for this notable work.

== Paris architect ==
Niermans definitely returned to architecture in 1891, and by 1894 his personal style had emerged from the Dutch influence. It was based on an extensive knowledge of styles of the past and the expectations of the public. Modern materials allow him to combine taste for the past with modern comfort for customers. He was naturalized as a French citizen in 1895 and joined the Central Society of Architecture, sponsored by the famous architect Charles Garnier.

In Paris he was involved in the decor and construction or renovation of many brasseries and theaters including the brasserie Mollard (1894–95), the Casino de Paris (1892-96), the Trianon-concert (1894–95), the tavern Pousset (1897–98), the Folies Bergère (1900) and the Moulin Rouge (1903). He designed the Royal Palace Hotel in Ostend in 1900, with a huge and ornate entrance, and with much of the wall of the central block of the hotel made of glass. The hotel has since been demolished. He also rebuilt the Hôtel du Palais in Biarritz, which had been badly damaged by a fire in 1903. Niermans extended the south wing, added two stories, and added a large bay holding a magnificent restaurant. The hotel now had larger salons for entertainments, and a salle des fêtes in Second Empire style. This project was completed in 1905.

He married Louise Marie Héloïse Dewachter (1871-1963) in 1895. She was the sister of Isidore Louis Dewachter, the Belgian post-impressionist artist who painted as Louis Dewis. They had three children: Jean Niermans, architect (1897-1989), Grand Prix de Rome in 1929; Hélène Niermans (born 1901); and Édouard, architect and, after World War II, also a businessman (1904-1984). In 1905 he officially changed his name from Eduard Johan to Edouard-Jean.

== Riviera ==
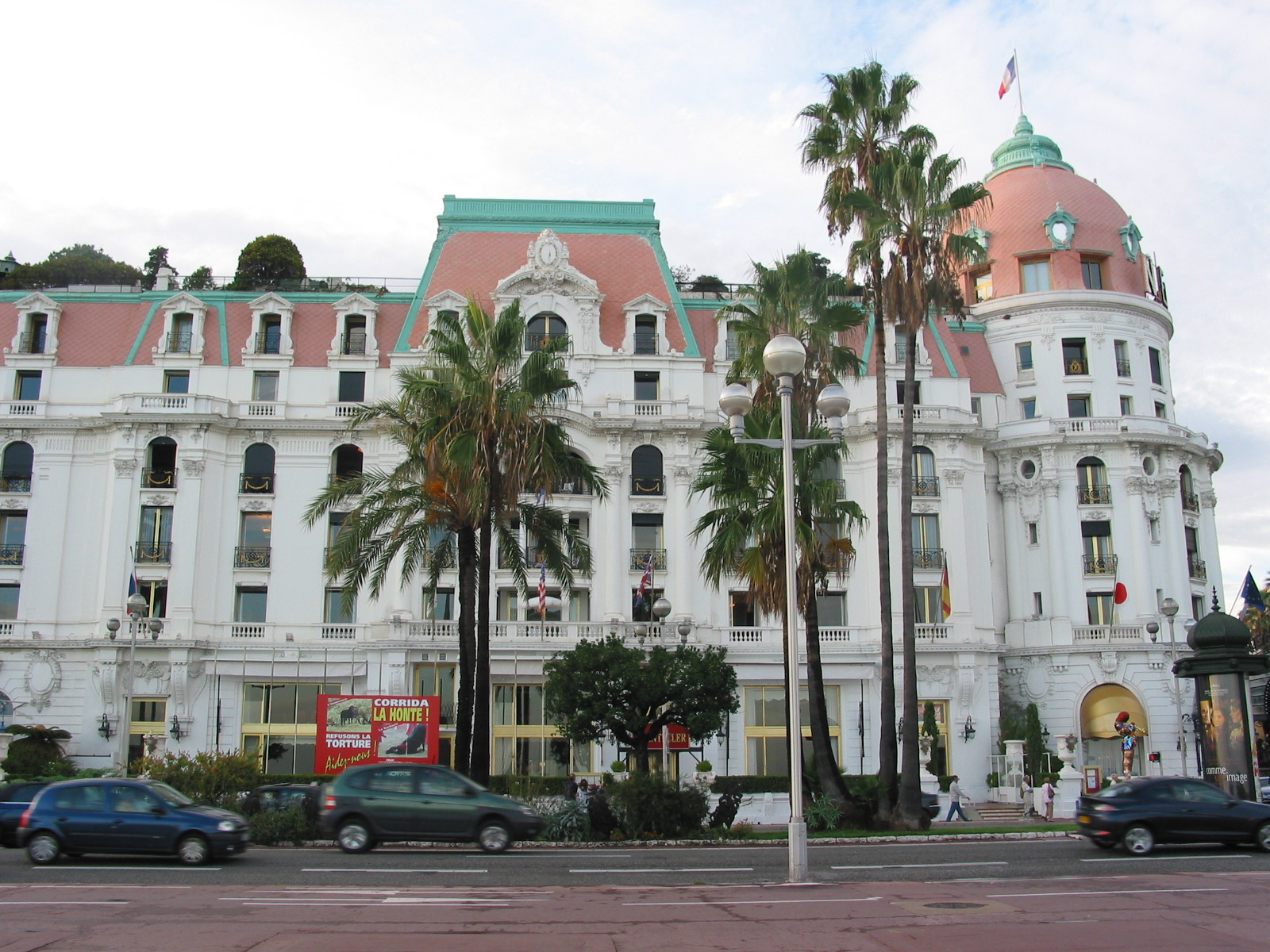
Hôtel Negresco founded by Henri Négresco and realized by Édouard Niermans in 1912 on the promenade des Anglais in Nice

In 1908 Niermans renovated the Hôtel de Paris in Monte-Carlo, expanding it and decorating the interior in an opulent baroque style. A distinctive feature was a glazed dome over the inner hall. In 1909, assisted by Eduardo Ferrès Puig, he designed the Palace Hotel in Madrid. That year he also modernized the rooms of the Municipal Casino in Nice, and settled in the French Riviera. He came to know many artists including Jules Chéret and Félix Ziem, and met Auguste Renoir. Two artists of lesser importance become close friends, Gervais and Lucas (who executed the paintings of the ambulatory of the Hotel Negresco). Between 1910 and 1914 Niermans was extremely active. He expanded the casino of Châtel-Guyon in Auvergne and built several houses.

In 1912 Niermans created the Hotel Negresco on the Promenade des Anglais in Nice for the Romanian hotelier Henri Négresco. He designed it for the reception of royalty, as with other hôtels-palais on the Riviera. This was a time when the Riviera was at the height of its popularity as a resort for the wealthy or high-born, two years before the outbreak of World War I. It was a rectangular building that occupied a full block of the Promenade des Anglais with four hundred rooms, each with a private bath. Two cupolas at the east and west corners were said to have been inspired by the breasts of La Belle Otero. The building had modern features like electric lights, elevators and telephones. A huge ballroom was roofed by a glass dome. Eight kings were present when the hotel opened in November 1912.

After World War I, Niermans worked in partnership with architects Émile Molinié (1877-1964), Charles Nicod and Albert Pouthier. He also worked with his architect sons, Édouard and Jean, who collaborated after their father's death until the mid-1960s. Jean became a particularly noted architect. After winning the Prix de Rome as a student in 1929, he would be named Knight (1938) and later Officer (1949) of the Legion of Honor; Officer of the Academy (1949); Member of the Academy (1956); and Knight of the Arts and Letters (1962). He also won the Croix de Guerre for his service in World War I.

Édouard-Jean Niermans died on 19 October 1928 in his chateau vineyard in Montlaur, Aude, about which he was passionate during the last years of his life. Montlaur is now owned by his grandchildren.

== Key achievements ==
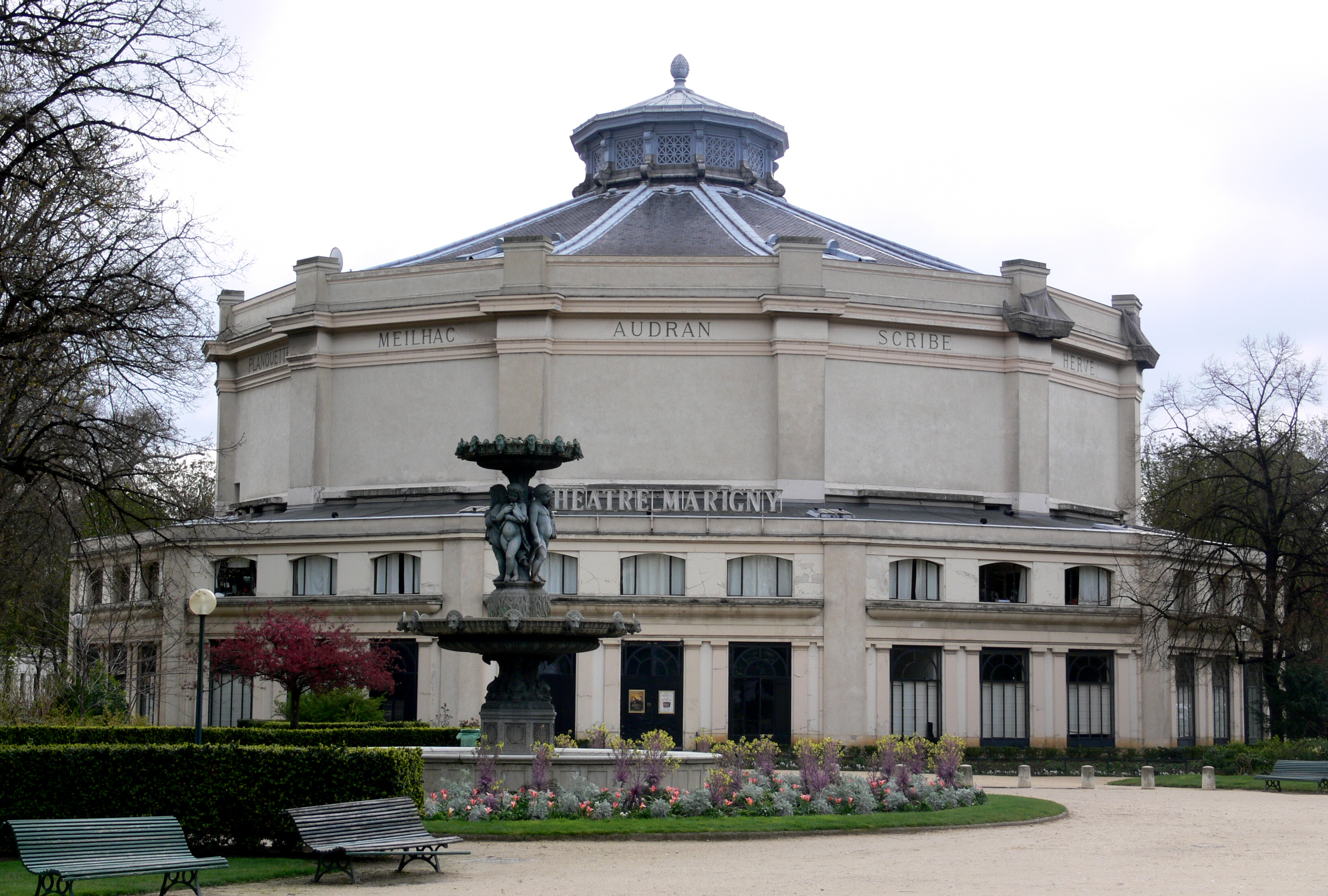
Théâtre Marigny, Avenue des Champs-Élysées, Paris

- 1889: Moulin Rouge in the 18th arrondissement of Paris
- 1889:Théâtre des Capucines, Boulevard des Capucines in the 8th arrondissement of Paris
- 1892-1896:Théâtre de Paris, restoration
- 1894:Le Trianon (theatre), Montmartre
- 1894-1898: Renovation of the Théâtre Marigny, in the 8th arrondissement of Paris (from a panorama built by Charles Garnier )
- 1899-1900: Royal Palace in Ostend in Belgium for the Compagnie internationale des Grands Hôtels
- 1900-1901: Apartment building, 12 rue Meynadier in the 19th arrondissement of Paris
- 1902-1903: Hotel at 12-14 rue Boucher de Perthes; chalets at 2-4 rue Duquesne; villas at 29 & 35 avenue du Marechal Foch in Mers-les-Bains (Somme)
- 1903-1905: Palace Hotel, 1 Avenue of the Empress in Biarritz (Pyrénées-Atlantiques)
- 1906-1907: Hotel Savoy at Fontainebleau-Avon ( Seine-et-Marne )
- 1908: Hôtel de Paris Monte-Carlo, renovation
- 1911-1912: Apartment building, 37bis Promenade des Anglais in Nice (Alpes-Maritimes)
- 1911-1913 Hôtel Pyrénées Palace, Bagnères-de-Luchon (Haute-Garonne)
- 1911-1913: Hôtel Negresco for Henri Negresco and Alexandre Darracq, Promenade des Anglais in Nice, with the painters H. Lucas and P. Gervais, and the decorator Barbéris
- 1912-1915: Park-Palace building, boulevard des Moulins and avenue Saint-Michel, Monte-Carlo, Monaco
- 1914-1919: Construction of the théâtre Mogador (operating architect), 25 rue de Mogador in the 9th arrondissement of Paris
- 1920-1926: Villa du Paradou (later known as Villa Le Colombier), 162 Boulevard du Mont-Boron, Nice (for himself and, later, his daughter, Hélène Niermans)
- 1926-1929: Villa 18 Avenue du Docteur Roux, Nice, with Jean Niermans
