= Fragonard (fragrance) =

French perfume manufacturer

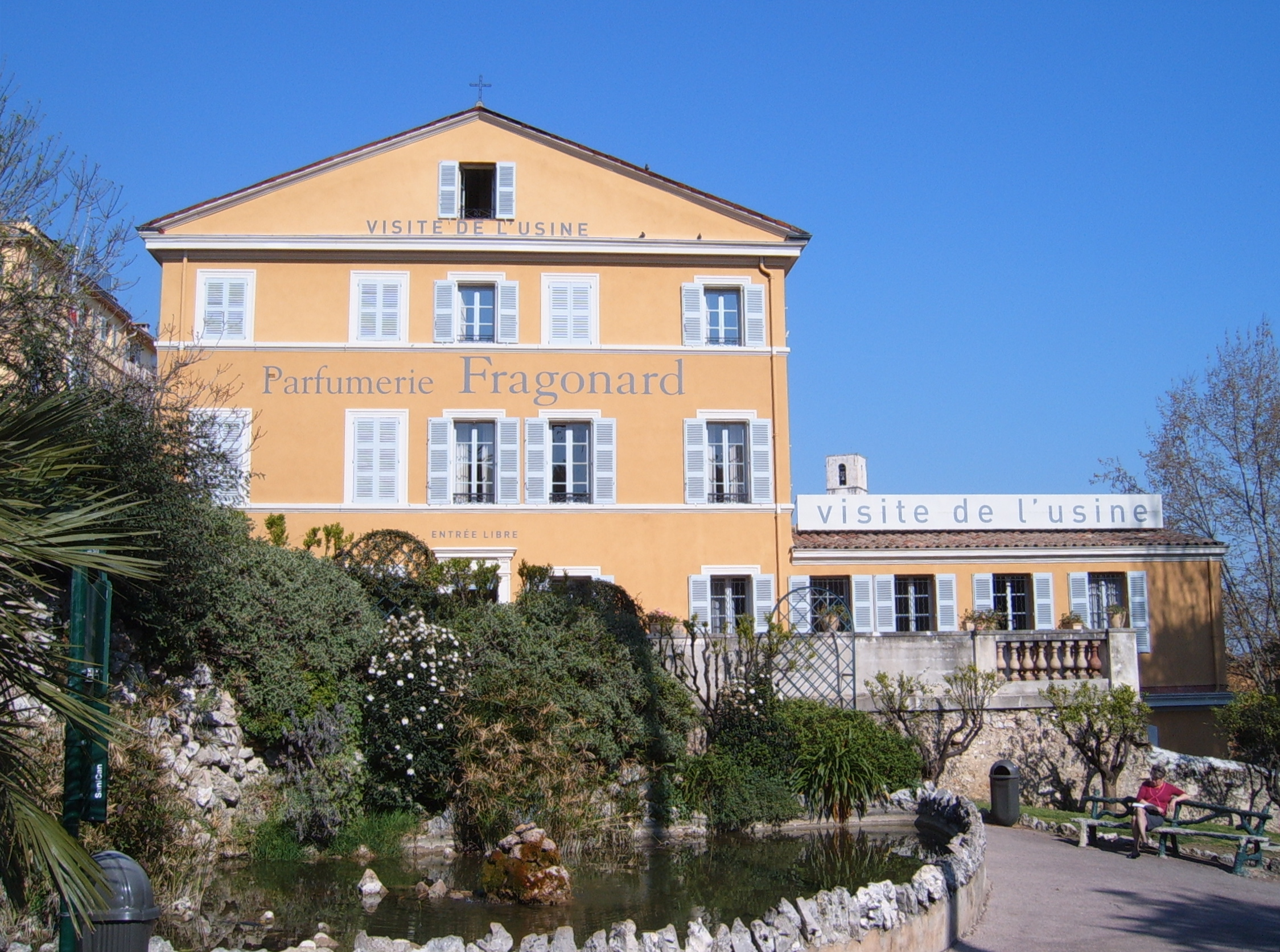
Fragonard Parfumeur in Grasse

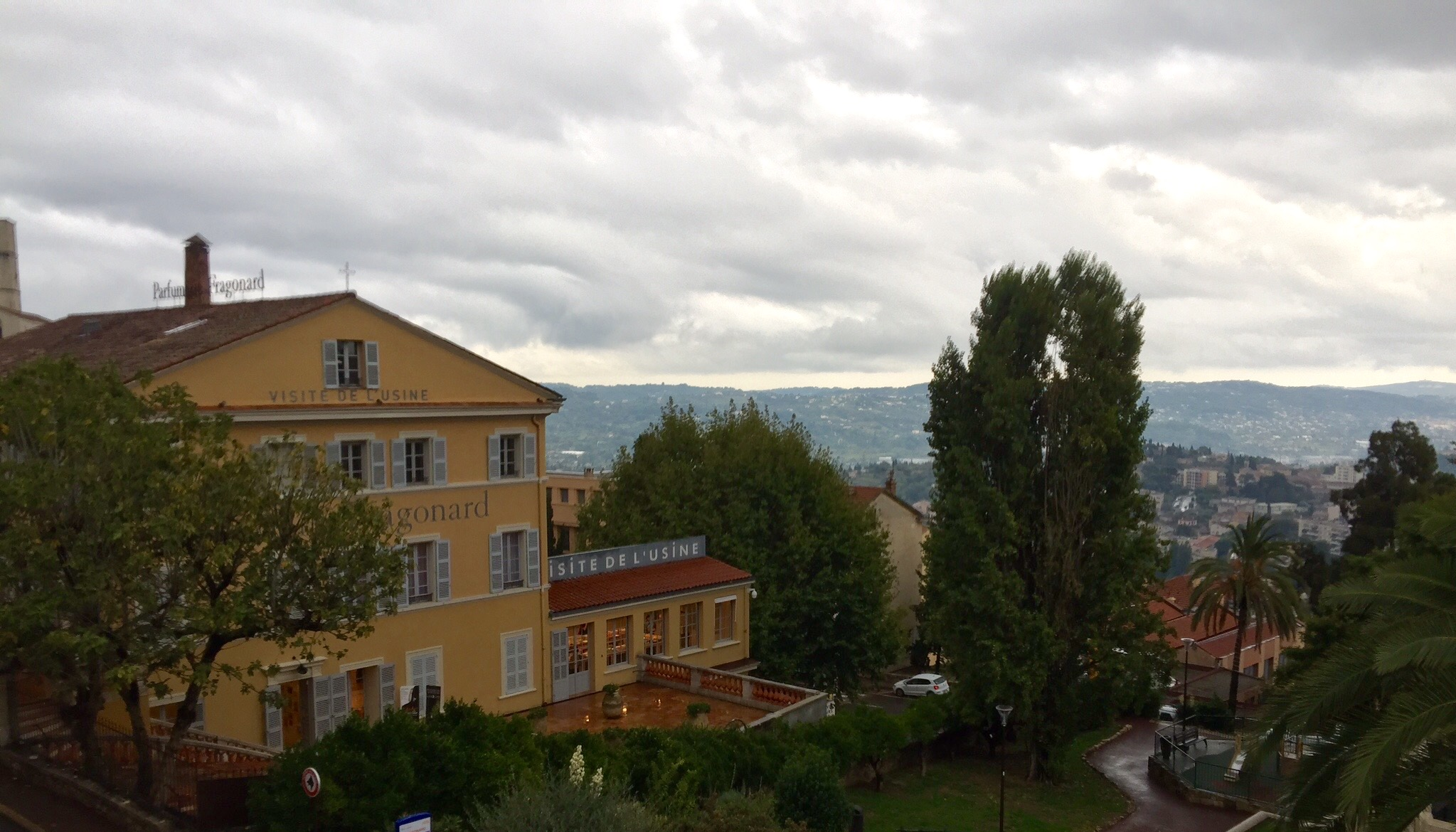
View of the Fragonard firm with the city of Grasse in the background

The Fragonard (French pronunciation: [fʁaɡɔnaʁ]) perfumery is one of the oldest perfumeries in Grasse (Côte d'Azur, France), located in the centre of the city. The company is formally registered as Les Parfumeries Fragonard and also trades under the name Fragonard Parfumeur.

== Overview ==
Fragonard was founded in 1926 by a former Parisian notary, Eugène Fuchs, in one of the oldest factories in the city, originally built by perfumer Claude Mottet in 1841. The firm is named after the local painter Jean-Honoré Fragonard, the son of the parfumer at the court.

The first Parisian boutique was opened in 1936.

In 1947, Fuchs started a collection of fragrance-related objects and exposed his acquisition in the factory, thus launching the company's venture into perfume and clothing museums in Paris and Grasse. The firm owns the Musée du Parfum in Paris covering the history of perfumery for more than 5000 years.

The company is run by Françoise and Agnès Costa, great granddaughters of Eugène Fuchs.

== Famous perfumes ==
- Billet Doux (1930)
- Moment Volé (1930)
- Belle de Nuit (1946)
- Eau de Hongrie (1979)
- Soleil (1995)
