= Hotel Negresco =

Hotel in Nice, France

Coordinates: 43°41′40″N 7°15′27″E

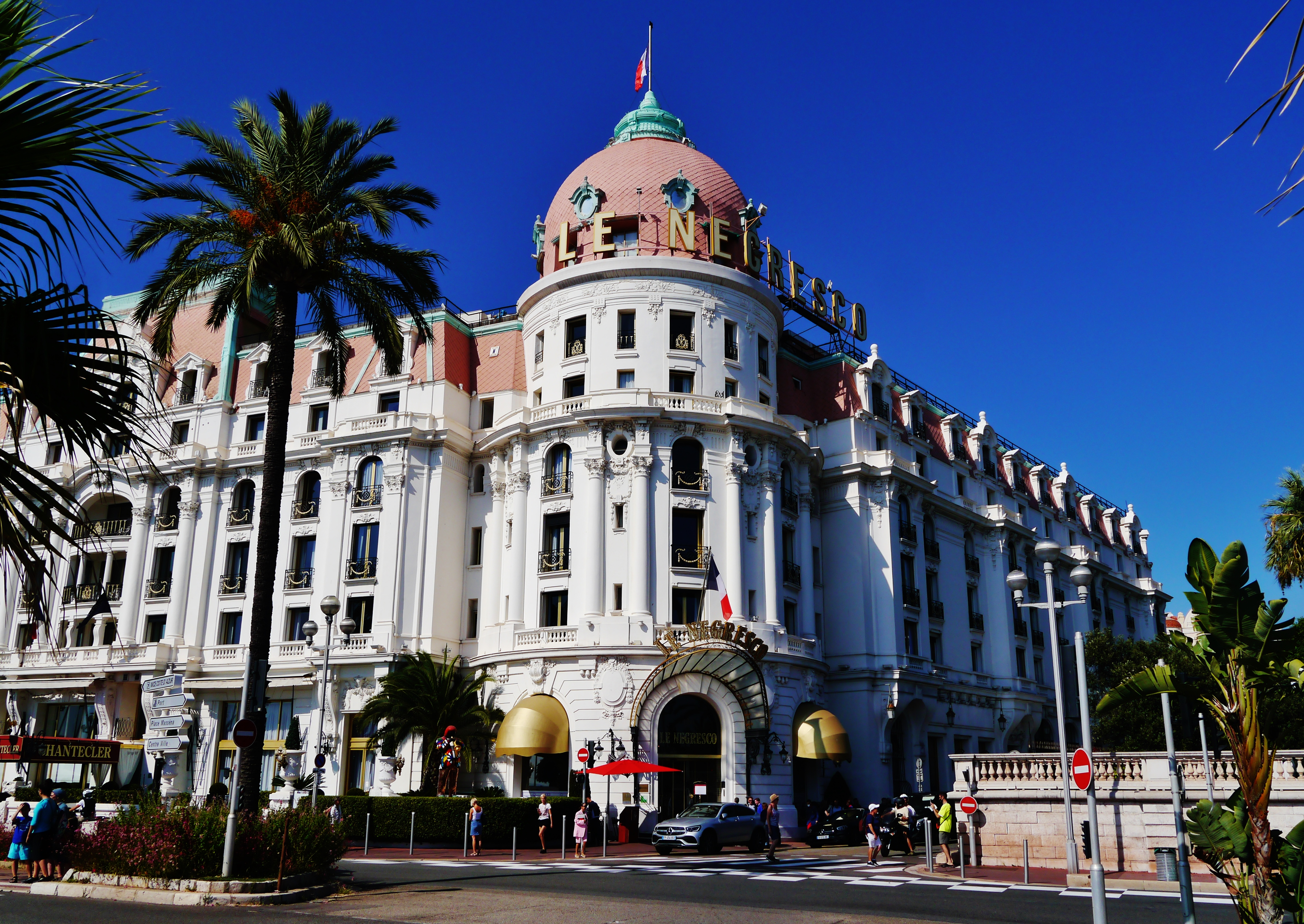
- Interactive map of the Hotel Negresco area

General information
- Type: Luxury hotel
- Architectural style: Neorenaissance
- Location: Nice, France
- Opened: 1913

Technical details
- Floor count: 5

Other information
- Number of rooms: 141

Website
- www.hotel-negresco-nice.com

The Hotel Negresco is a luxury hotel and site of the restaurant Le Chantecler, located on the Promenade des Anglais on the Baie des Anges in Nice, France. It was named after Henri Negresco (1868–1920), who had the palatial hotel constructed, and who opened it in 1912.

== History ==
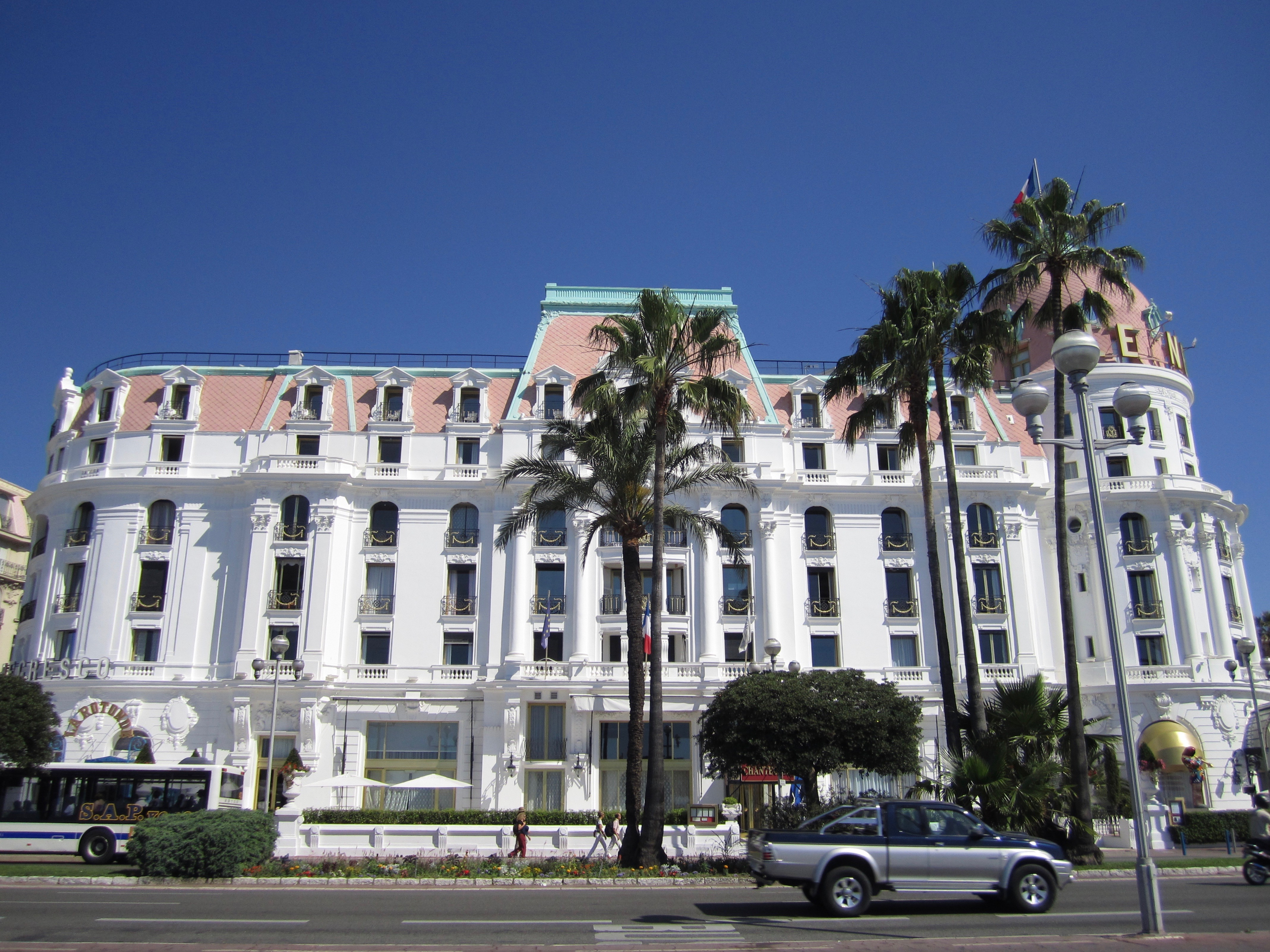
The hotel as seen from the Promenade des Anglais

Henri Negresco, born Alexandru Negrescu, was the son of an innkeeper. He was educated in Romania and began his professional career as a confectioner at the renowned Casa Capșa in Bucharest. At the age of 25—though some earlier sources suggest 15, which seems unlikely given that he completed military service in Romania and there is photographic evidence of him in Bucharest at an older age—Negresco left Romania. He first moved to Paris and later settled on the French Riviera, where he found considerable success.

As director of the Municipal Casino in Nice, he had the idea to build a sumptuous hotel of quality that would attract the wealthiest of clients. After arranging the financing, he hired the great architect of the "café society" Édouard-Jean Niermans to design the hotel and its now famous pink dome. The spectacular Baccarat 16,309-crystal chandelier in the Negresco's Royal Lounge had been commissioned by Czar Nicholas II who, due to the October Revolution was unable to take delivery.

In keeping with the conventions of the times, its front opened on the side opposite the Mediterranean Sea. Contrary to popular belief, the large window of the Royal Lounge – listed as an Historical Monument – is not the work of Gustave Eiffel. Eiffel never worked at the Negresco; instead it is entirely the work of Edouard-Jean Niermans.

Henri Negresco faced a downturn in his affairs when World War I broke out in 1914. His hotel was converted to a hospital. By the end of the war, the number of wealthy visitors to the Riviera had dropped off to the point that the hotel was in severe financial difficulty. Seized by creditors, the Negresco was sold to a Belgian company. Henri Negresco died a few years later in Paris at the age of 52.

February 28, 1948, Suzy Delair sang C'est si bon in this hotel during the first Nice Jazz Festival. Louis Armstrong was present and loved the song. June 26, 1950, he recorded the American version of the song (English lyrics by Jerry Seelen) in New York City with Sy Oliver and his Orchestra. When it was released, the disc was a worldwide success and the song was then performed by the greatest international singers.

Over the years, the hotel had its ups and downs, and in 1957, it was sold to the Augier family. Madame Jeanne Augier reinvigorated the hotel with luxurious decorations and furnishings, including an outstanding art collection and rooms with mink bedspreads. She also popularised it with celebrities; Elton John featured it in the video for his song "I'm Still Standing", and she told Bill Gates, the founder of Microsoft, that purchasing it would be beyond his means.

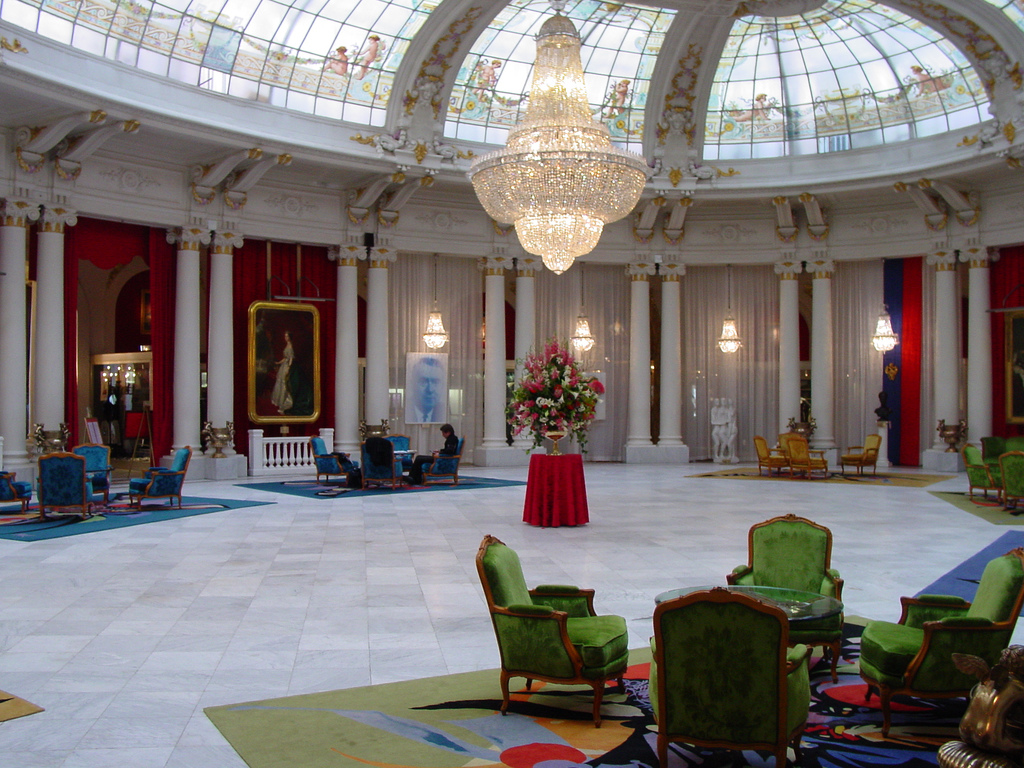
The Royal Lounge with its chandelier and stained glass window

Noted for its doormen dressed in the manner of the staff in 18th-century elite bourgeois households, complete with red-plumed postilion hats, the hotel also offers gourmet dining at the Regency-style Le Chantecler restaurant. Le Chantecler has two stars in the Guide Michelin and 15/20 in Gault Millau. It has previously been under the leadership of famous chefs such as Bruno Turbot and Alain Llorca, who left to take over the equally fabled Moulin de Mougins. The restaurant interior is decorated with gobelins and roccoco furniture in untraditional colourings such as pink, lime, lemon, and cerulean.

In 2003, the Hotel Negresco was listed by the government of France as a National Historic Building and is a member of Leading Hotels of the World. In total, the Hotel Negresco has 119 guest rooms plus 22 suites.

== In contemporary times ==
The fifth floor of the hotel is for "VVIP" guests, which stands for "very, very important persons". The hotel has a private beach, which is located across the street from the facility.

In the wake of the 2016 Nice truck attack, the hotel's main hall was used to triage wounded civilians.

The hotel hosted the opening ceremony of the Junior Eurovision Song Contest 2023 on November 20, 2023.

== Gallery ==
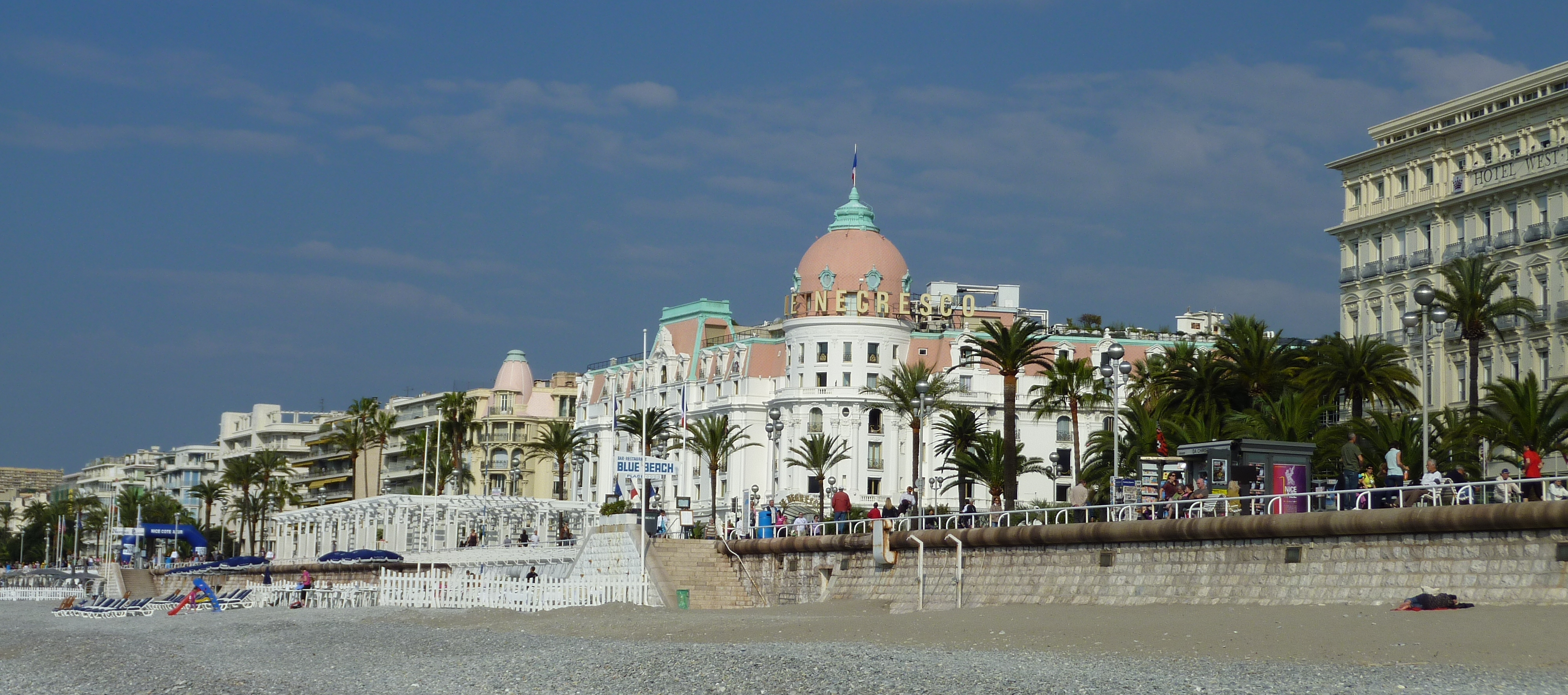
View of the hotel and the Promenade des Anglais from the beach.

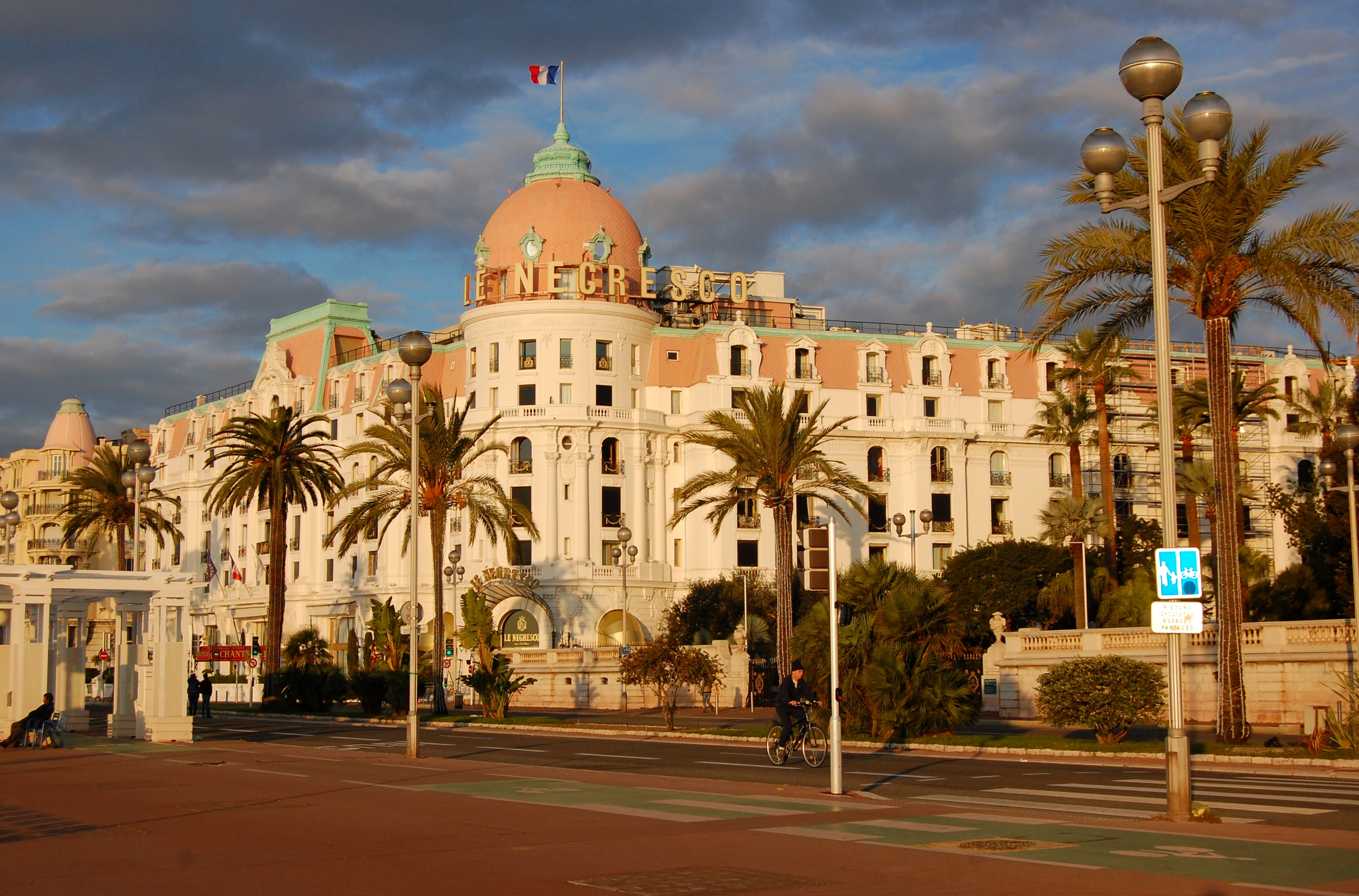
View at sunrise from the Promenade des Anglais.

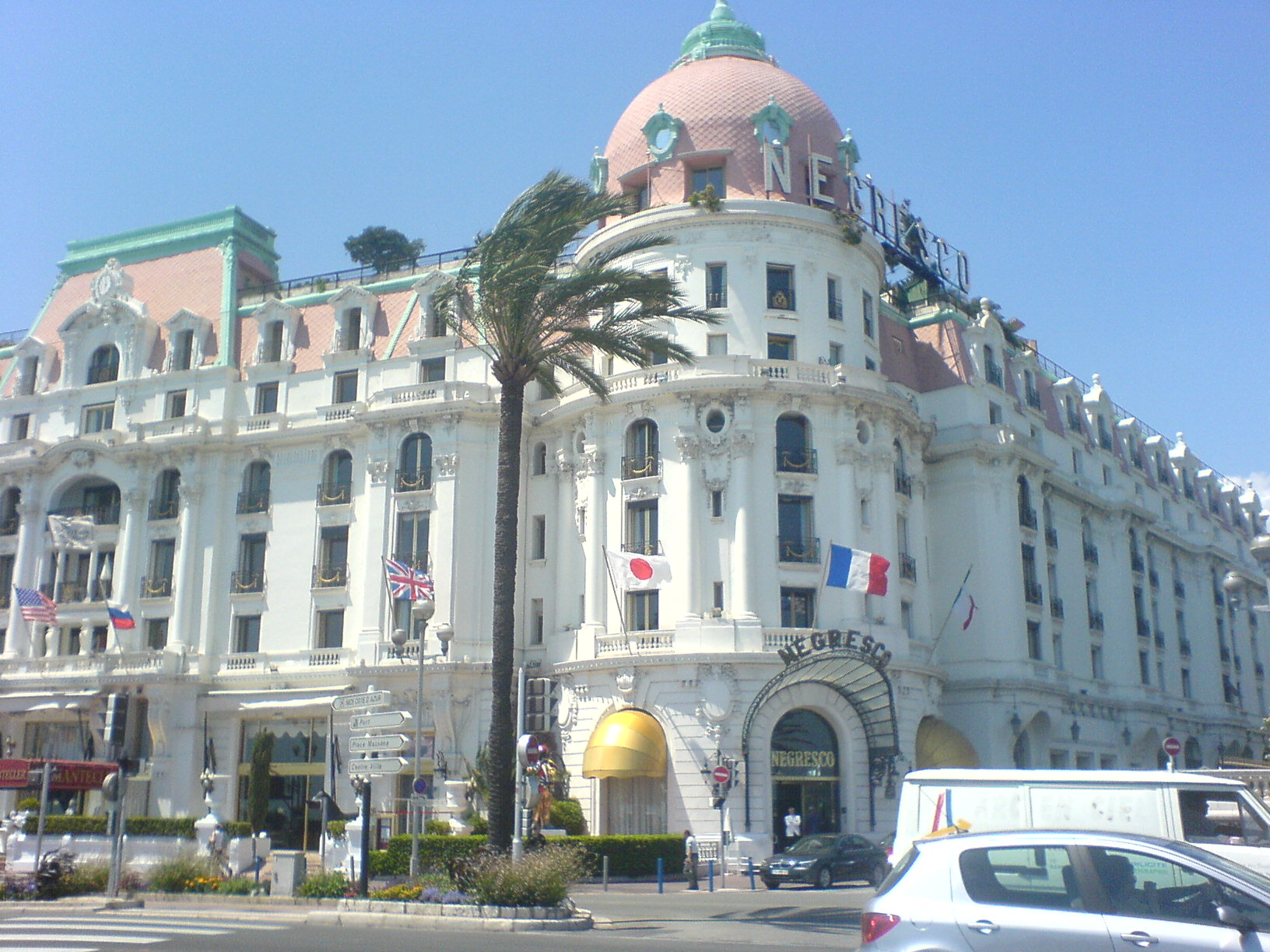
Vue from the promenade des Anglais during the day

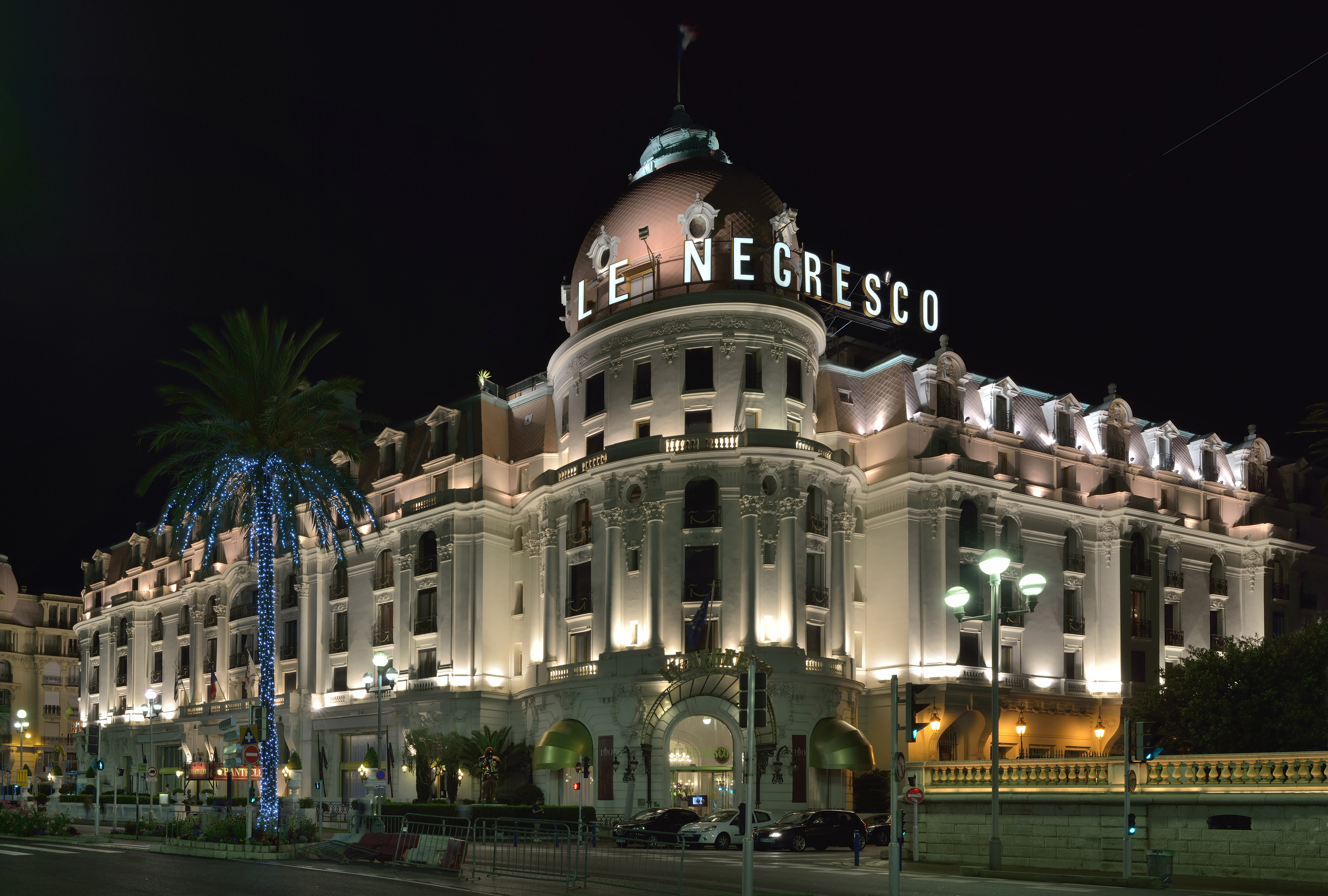
View at night

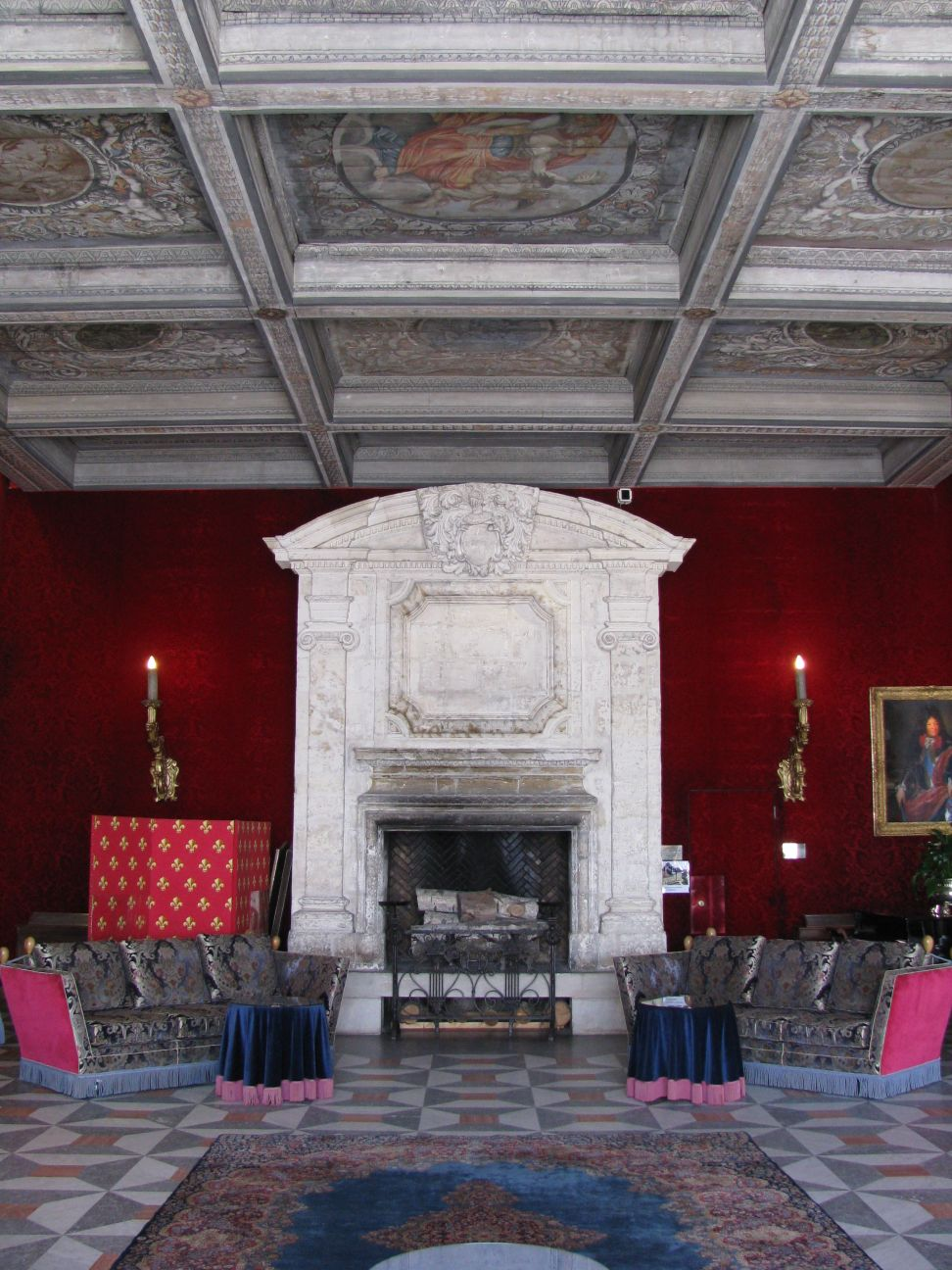
The salon

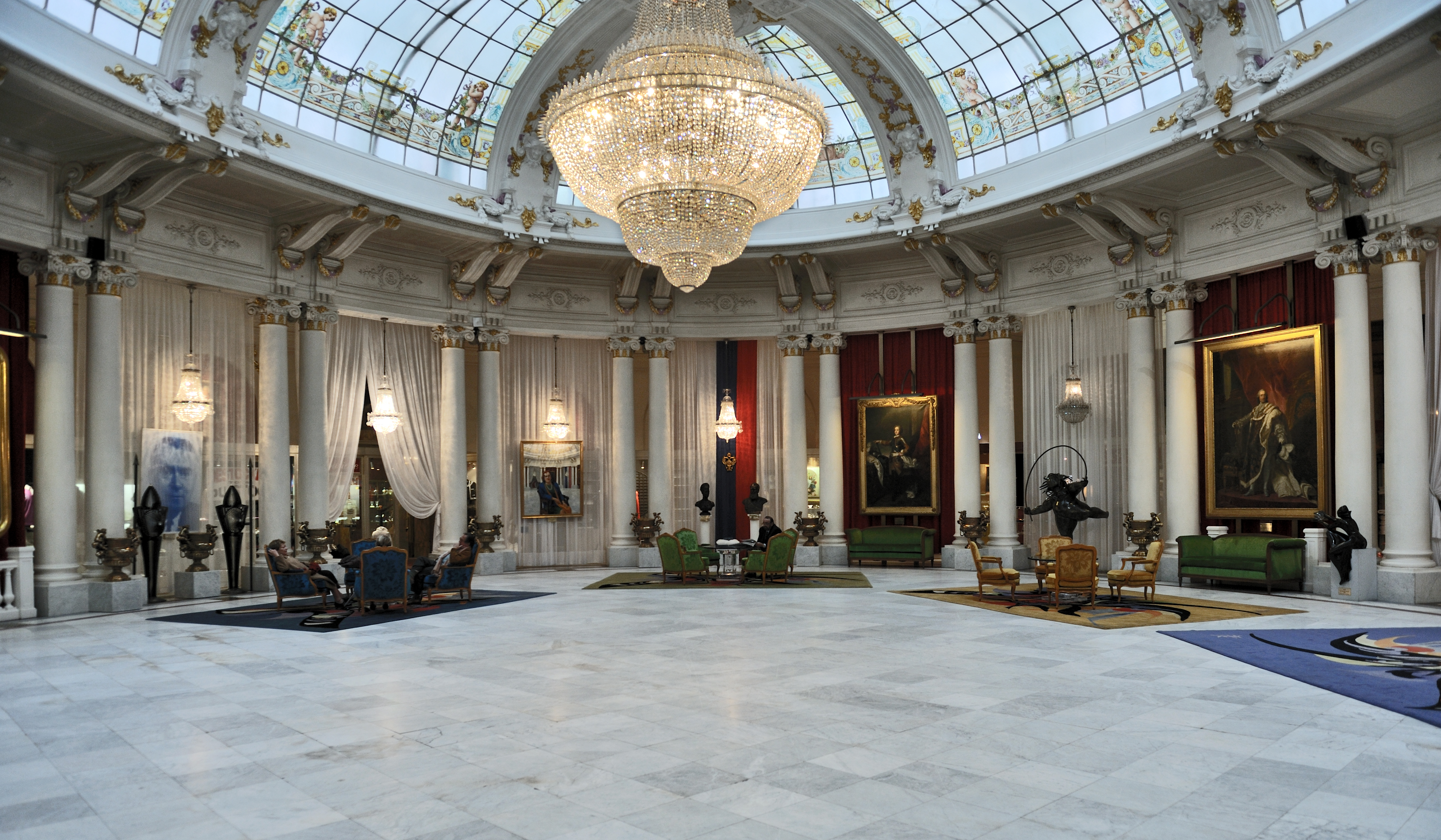
Inside the Royal Lounge

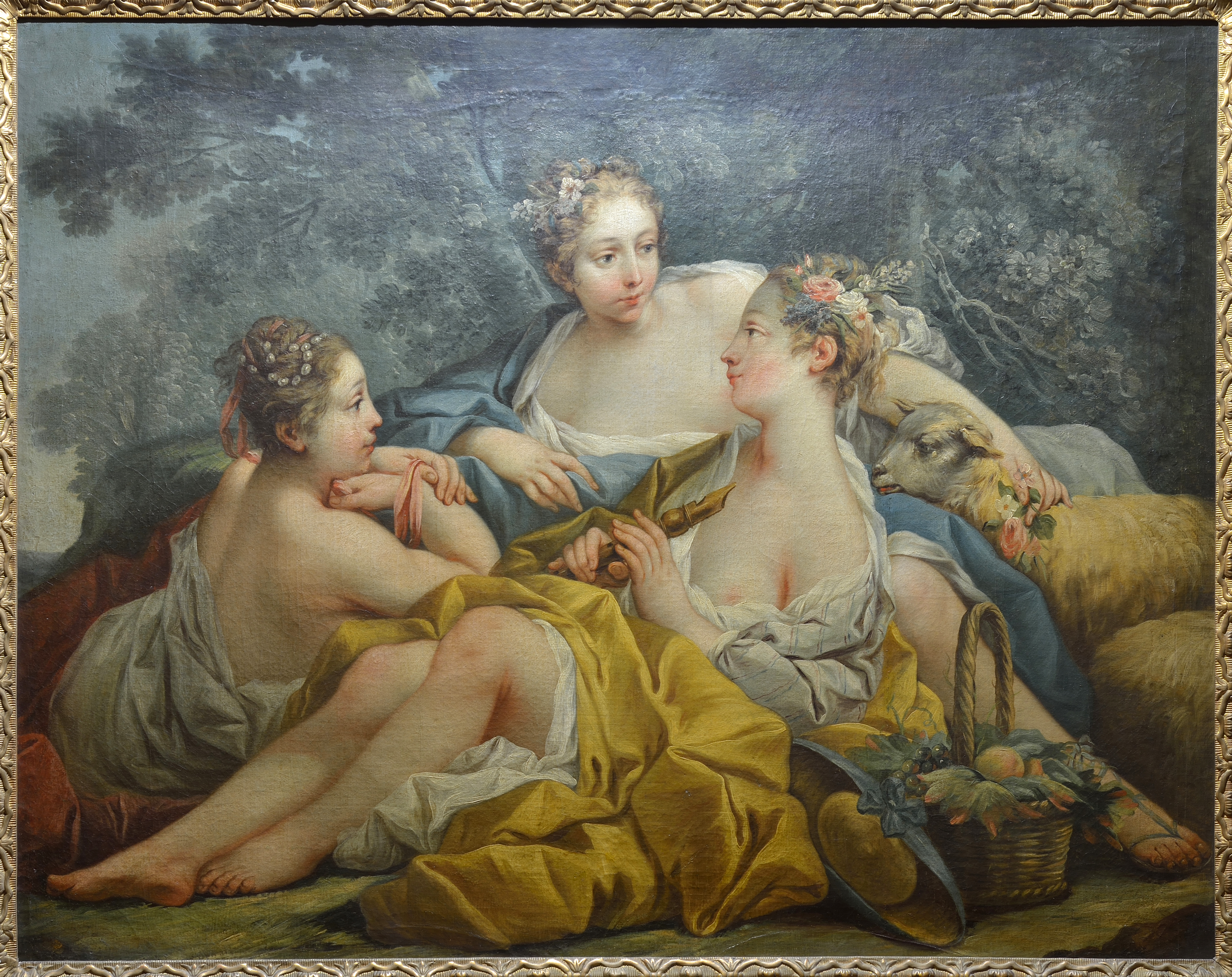
Nymphes jouant de la flûte, by François Boucher.

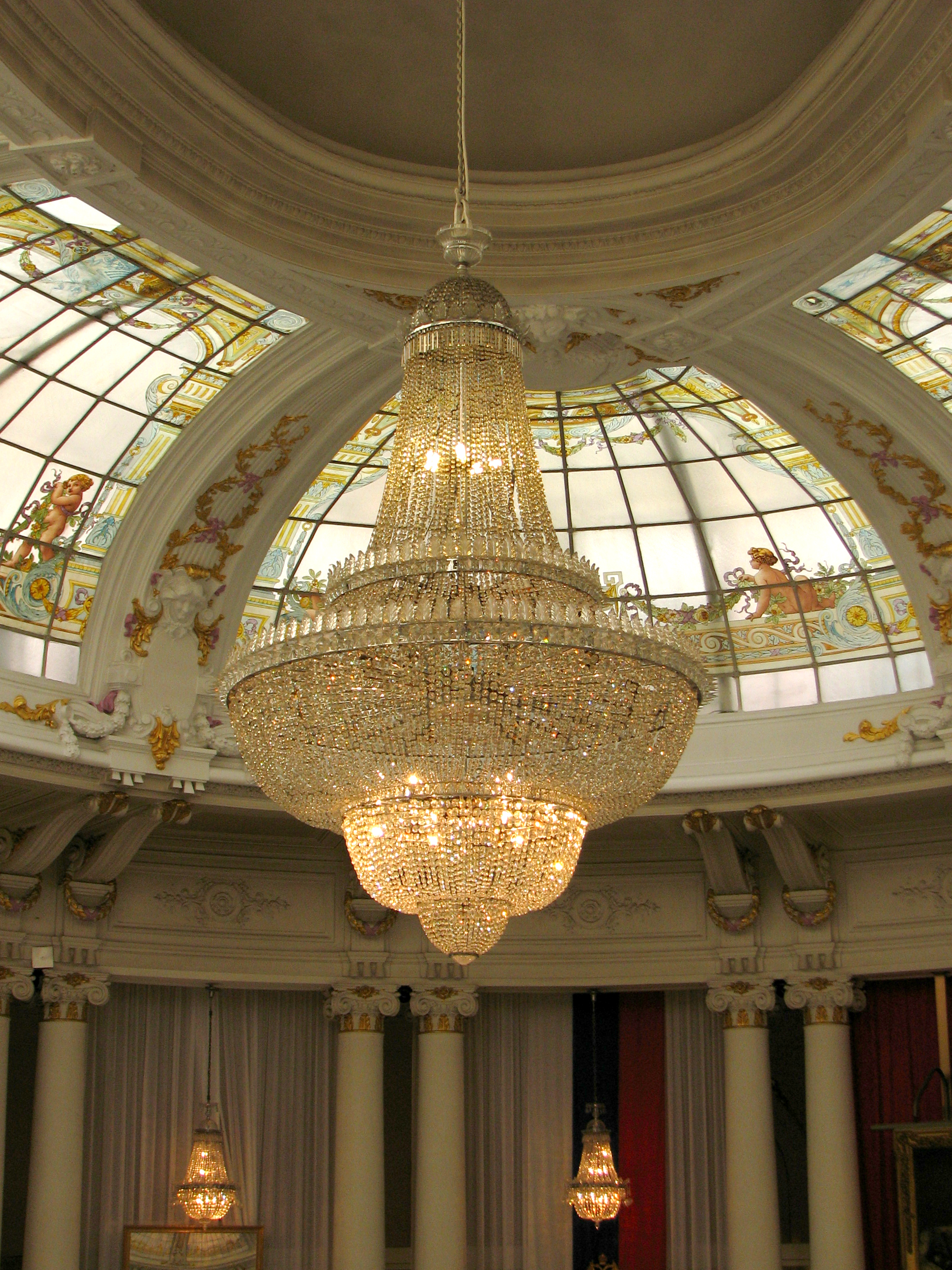
16,800 piece crystal chandelier in the Royal Lounge

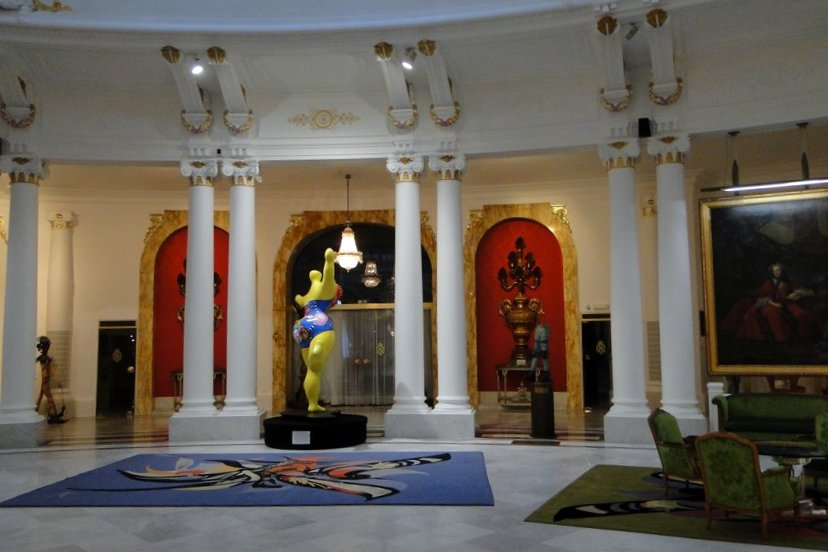
The Main hall
