= Henri Negresco =

Romanian hotelier (1870–1920)

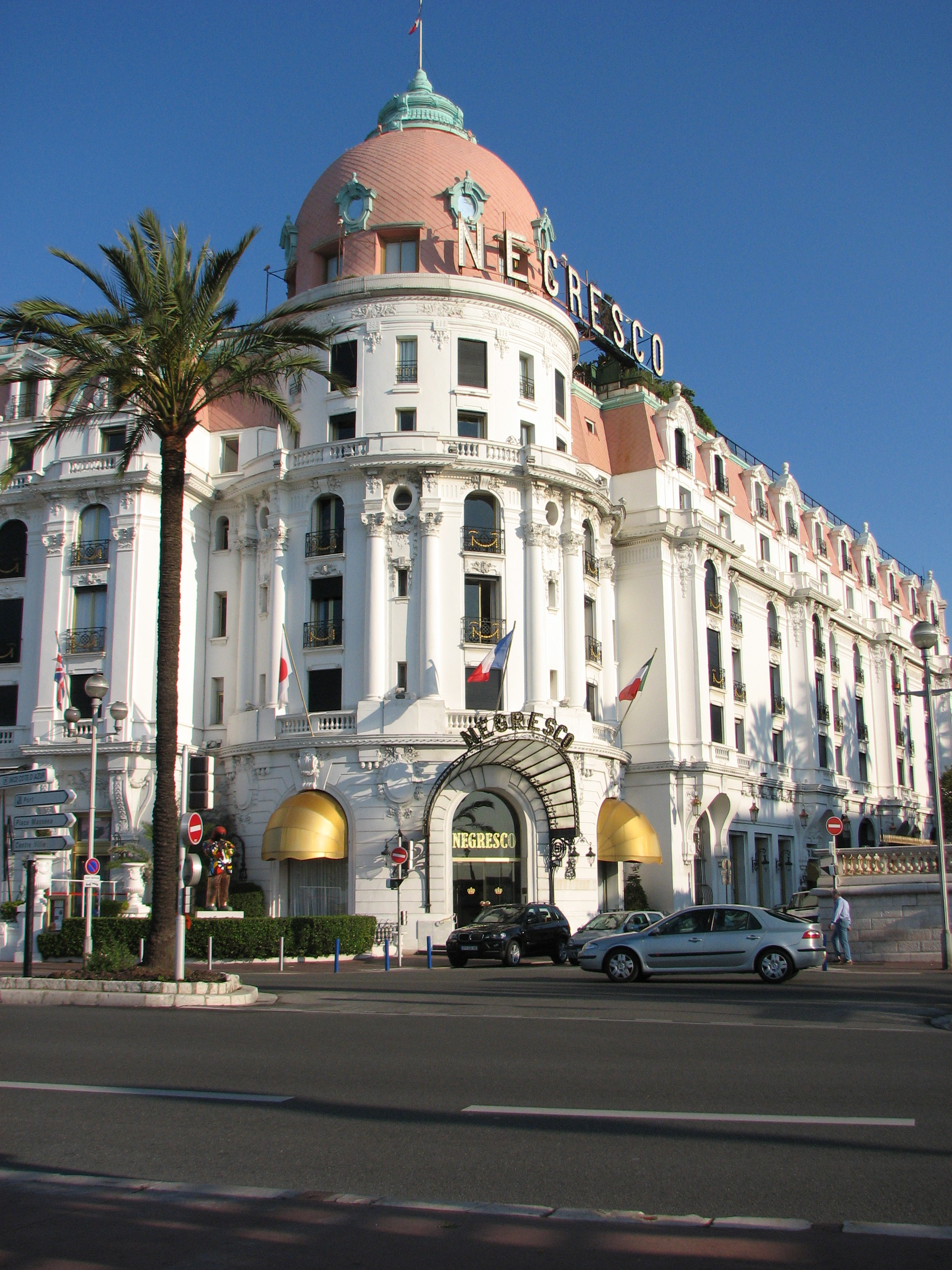
Hotel Negresco

Henri Alexandre Negresco (né Alexandru Negrescu; 14 March 1870 – 14 May 1920) was a Romanian hotelier and founder of the Hotel Negresco in Nice, France. He died bankrupt after World War I, his hotel having been commandeered into a hospital during the war. During the 14 July 2016 attack on the Promenade des Anglais, Negresco's hotel once again became a field hospital used to aid victims.

== Early years and education ==
Alexandru Negrescu was born 14 March 1870, in Bucharest, Romania, to a half Jewish father, Jean Negrescu (born 1837), an innkeeper, and Maria Rădescu (born 1839). The family had lived in Mihăileni, Botoșani County prior to Alexandru's birth. He apprenticed with the confectioners Casa Capșa, in Bucharest, and Casa Boissier in Paris, settling in Paris by 1895, though he may have traveled there before that date as well.

== Career ==
Negrescu was known to have lived at No. 14 Rue des Saussaies, Paris, for many years. His first job in Paris was at a restaurant in the same building, owned by Rodolphe Schipper. He married Suzanne Bianca Rădescu (born November 15, 1874, Bucharest) on 6 July 1907. They were known to have lived in Brussels, Belgium for a period, as their daughter, Germaine Henriette Hélène was born there on 4 December 1900. In 1909, Negresco became a French citizen.

Negrescu moved to Monte-Carlo, working as a butler and then directing operations at Helder restaurant. He was also known to have worked at Londres, a restaurant-hotel, and it was here that he showed his talent to care for and retain elite customers, including billionaires, kings and princes, such as the Vanderbilt and Rockefeller families, Basil Zaharoff, and Isaac Singer. After Charles Lefranc, a merchant of Nice, recommended Henri Negresco to Edouard Baudoin, the new concessionaire of the Nice Municipal Casino (1979 demolition), Negresco accepted a casino restaurant management position at a salary of 20,000 francs per year, eventually becoming Director of the Nice Municipal Casino, and friends, in 1904, with the architect Édouard Niermans. In this same period, Negresco bought the restaurant/casino Enghien-les-Bains, where he worked summers, alternating with the restaurant in Nice during the period of November through March.

Through his relationship with Alexandre Darracq, land was purchased from the Faithful Companions of Jesus, to build a large hotel in Nice, with at least 400 rooms, for 1.2 million francs. After visiting hotels in Paris, London, Berlin, and Brussels, design plans were completed in May 1911, and construction began in September of that year. Negresco and Darracq established a company, Negresco & Cie, to operate the hotel with a registered capital of 1.11 million francs, which opened 4 January 1913.

The Hotel Negresco, nicknamed "Le Palais de Belle Époque", was built by Niermans, the Dutch Belle Époque architect, in a style characteristic of 1872, on the Promenade des Anglais, facing the Baie des Anges. But in 1914, he was mobilized for World War I and the hotel was commandeered into "Temporary hospital no. 15". At the end of the war, the clientele did not return. Bankrupt, he died of liver cancer in Paris at 74 Avenue des Champs-Élysées, in 1920, and was buried at Batignolles Cemetery. In later years, his hotel was classified as a National Historic Monument (1974) and National Historic Building (2003) by the French state; the current owner is Jeanne Augier.
