= Baie des Anges =

Bay in Alpes-Maritimes, France

- Baia dei Àngels (Occitan)
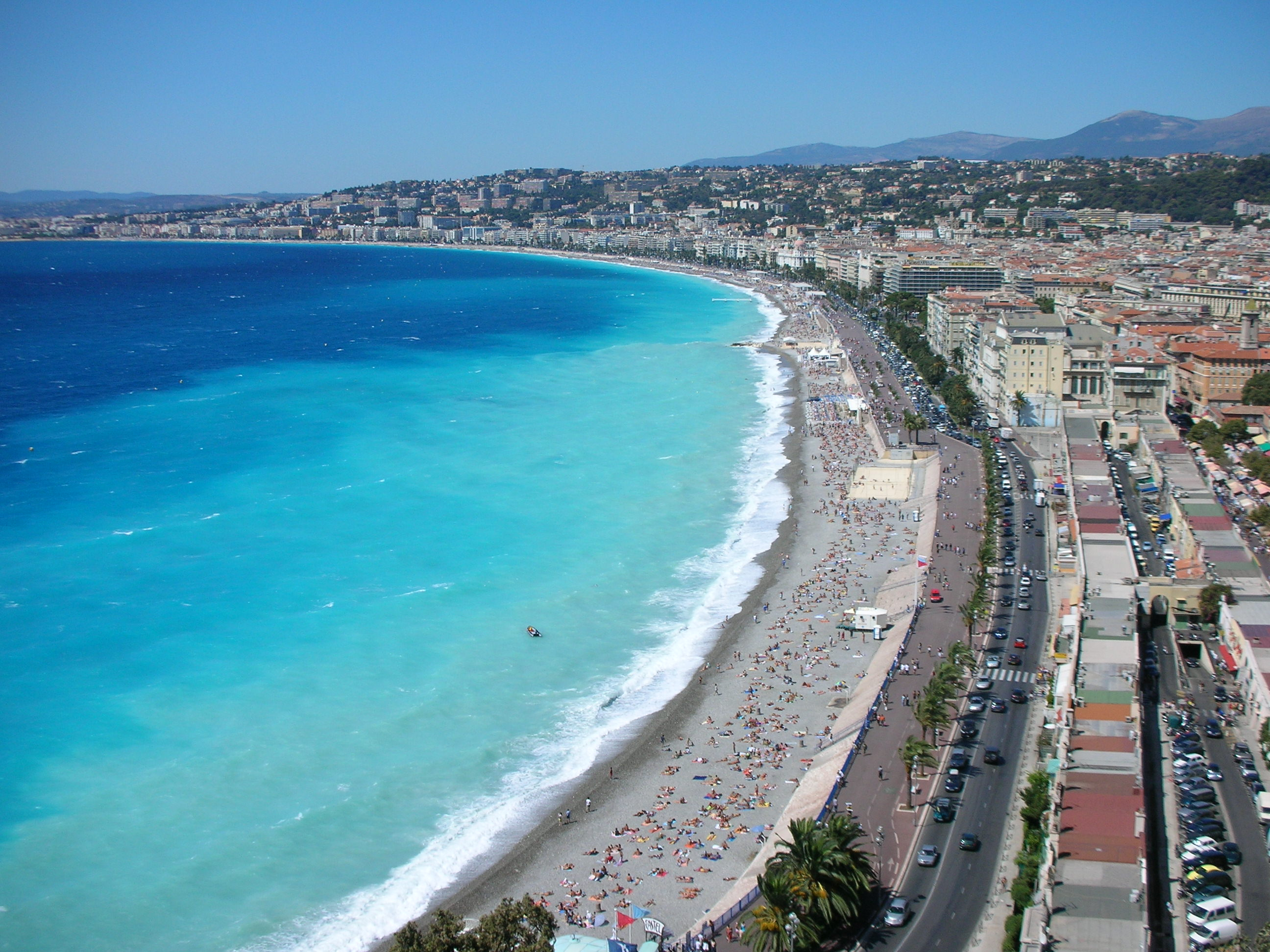
- Aerial view of the Baie des Anges and the Promenade des Anglais in Nice

- Location of Baie des Anges in France Baie des Anges (Provence-Alpes-Côte d'Azur)
- Location: Alpes-Maritimes, France
- Coordinates: 43°37′15″N 7°13′18″E
- Type: Bay
- Part of: Mediterranean Sea
- Max. length: 20 km (12 mi)

The Baie des Anges (transl. Bay of Angels, Occitan: Baia dei Àngels) is a bay of the Mediterranean Sea, in Alpes-Maritimes, France, extending between the communes of Antibes to the west and Nice to the east. It is bordered by five municipalities: Antibes, Villeneuve-Loubet, Cagnes-sur-Mer, Saint-Laurent-du-Var, and Nice. In Nice, the Baie des Anges is bordered by four major landmarks: Nice Côte d’Azur airport, the Promenade des Anglais, Lympia port, and Mont Boron.

Six rivers flow into the bay from west to east, which include Brague, Loup, Cagne, Var, Magnan, and Paillon.

== Etymology ==
There are various theories on the origin of the name of the bay:

- According to Christian mythology, angels brought back the boat containing the martyr body of Saint Réparate, in the 3rd century, from Judea to the current Bay of Angels (later buried in Nice Cathedral).
- According to the poem Adam et Ève by Alexis de Jussieu, published in 1856, Adam and Eve, after being chased out of the paradise, were led to these shores by compassionate angels.
- According to local history, the local fishermen gave the name to this bay, in relation to the angelsharks brought back in their nets at this place. Francis Gag (1900-1988), a writer from Nice, documented a recurring tradition involving local fishermen and a species of shark. In this tradition, fishermen would transport a shark on a cart. This shark, referred to as “lu pei ange” (angel fish), was showcased by a fisherman’s wife who would exclaim, “Venés, vèire la marrida bestiassa que desstrugue lu aret dòu paure pescadou!” (Come, come and see the bad beast that destroys the poor fisherman’s nets!). The sharks in question are identified as smoothback angelshark.
- Originally a simple nickname, the name of the bay is a toponym to be distinguished from local, primarily tourist appellations, such as Côte d'Azur, Mediterranean Riviera, or Beausoleil.

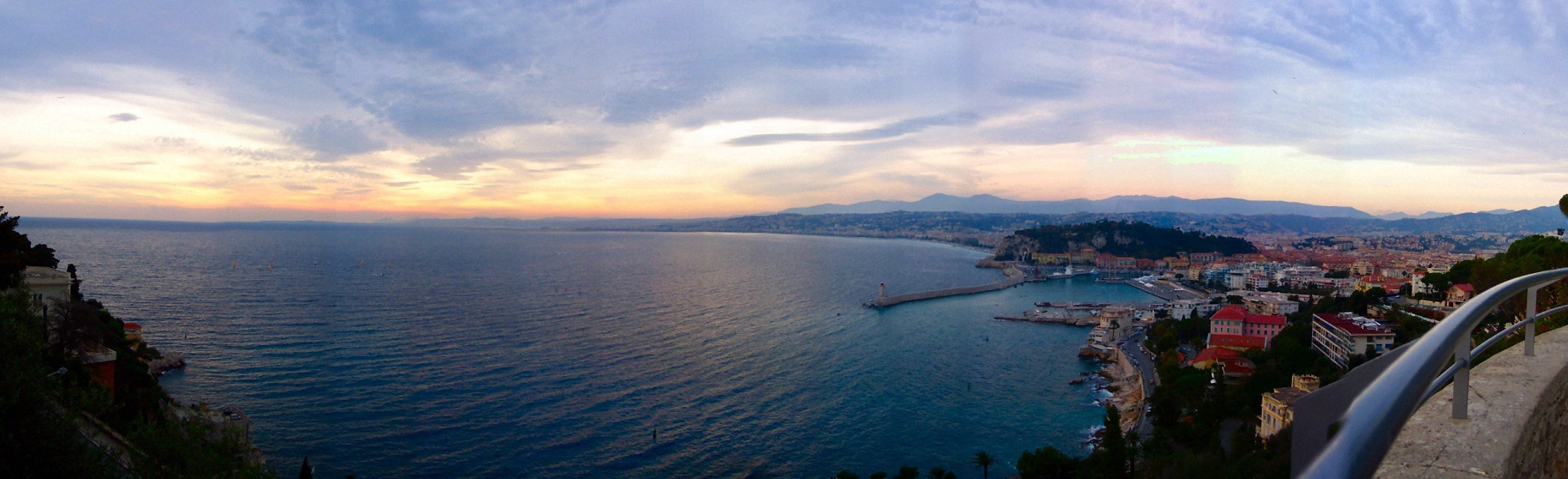
Baie des Anges, seen from the cornice of Mont Boron in Nice

== Coastal development and urban planning ==
The Pont des Anges, also called Pont Napoléon, was built in the 19th century at the mouth of the Paillon located on the current Promenade des Anglais, then called Chemin des Anglais or Chemin des Anges.

During the second half of the 20th century, the coastline of the Baie des Anges was extensively redeveloped with the aim of promoting tourism in Alpes-Maritimes. This included rapid development of transport infrastructures like seaside roads, train lines from Marseille-Saint-Charles to Ventimiglia, the luxury train Le Train Bleu, and the Nice Côte d’Azur airport. There were also new places for tourists, like beaches and marinas. These included the Lympia port in Nice, the dock at Villefranche-sur-Mer, the Vauban port in Antibes, the Saint-Laurent-du-Var marina, the Marina Baie des Anges in Villeneuve-Loubet, and Marineland in Antibes. The Cagnes-sur-Mer racecourse was also built.

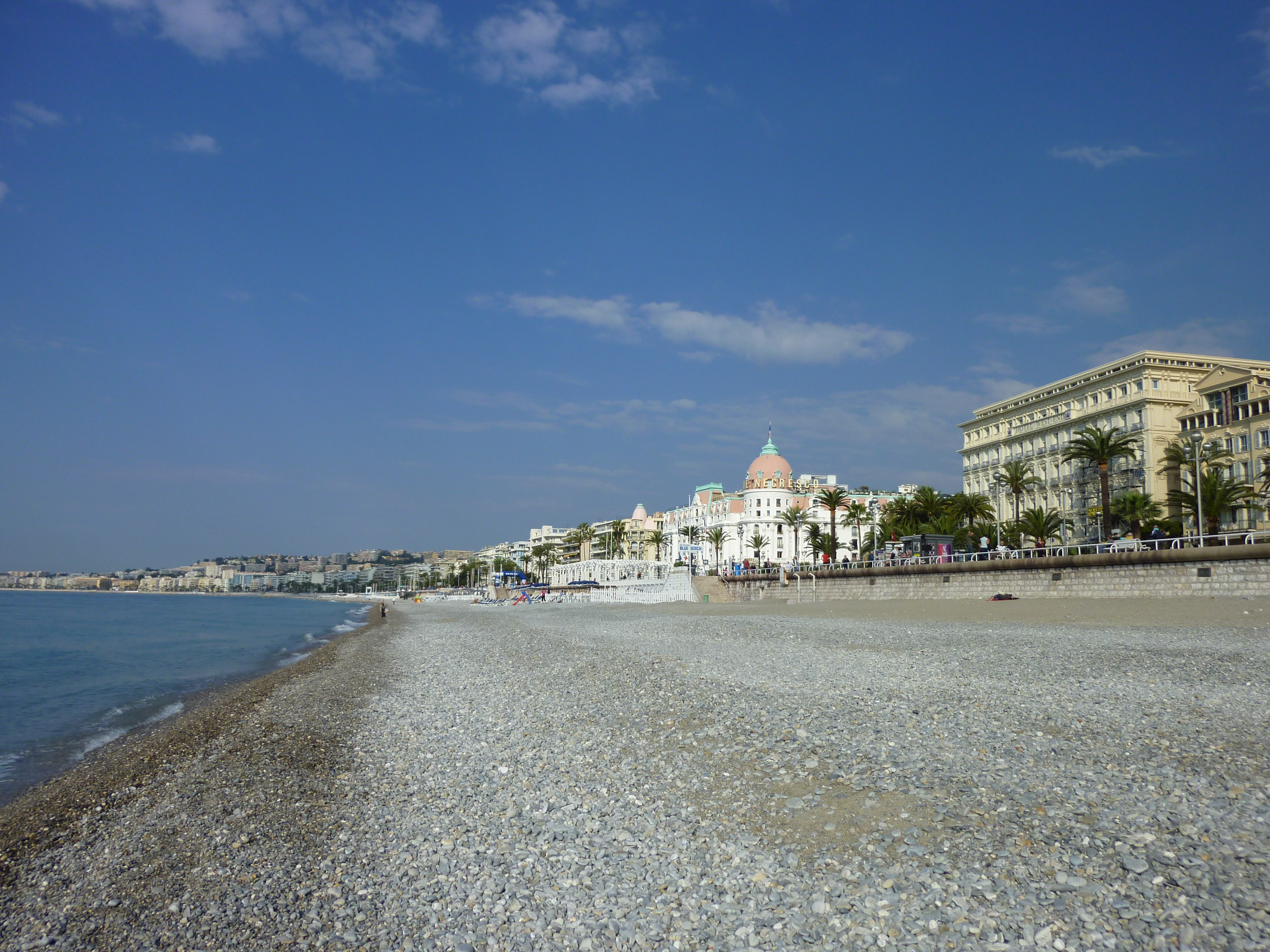
Nice beach and Hotel Negresco

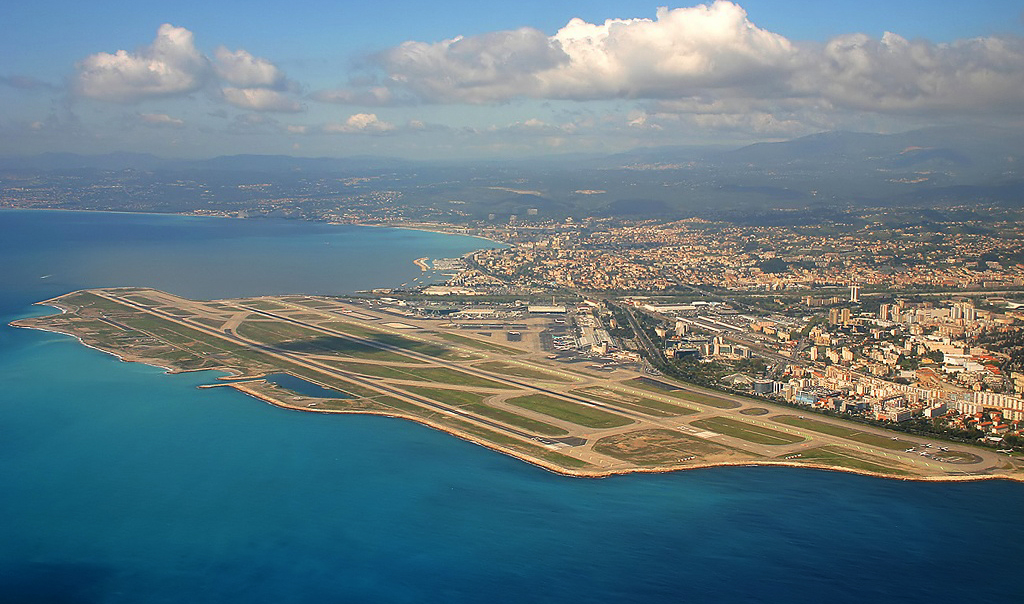
Nice Côte d'Azur Airport

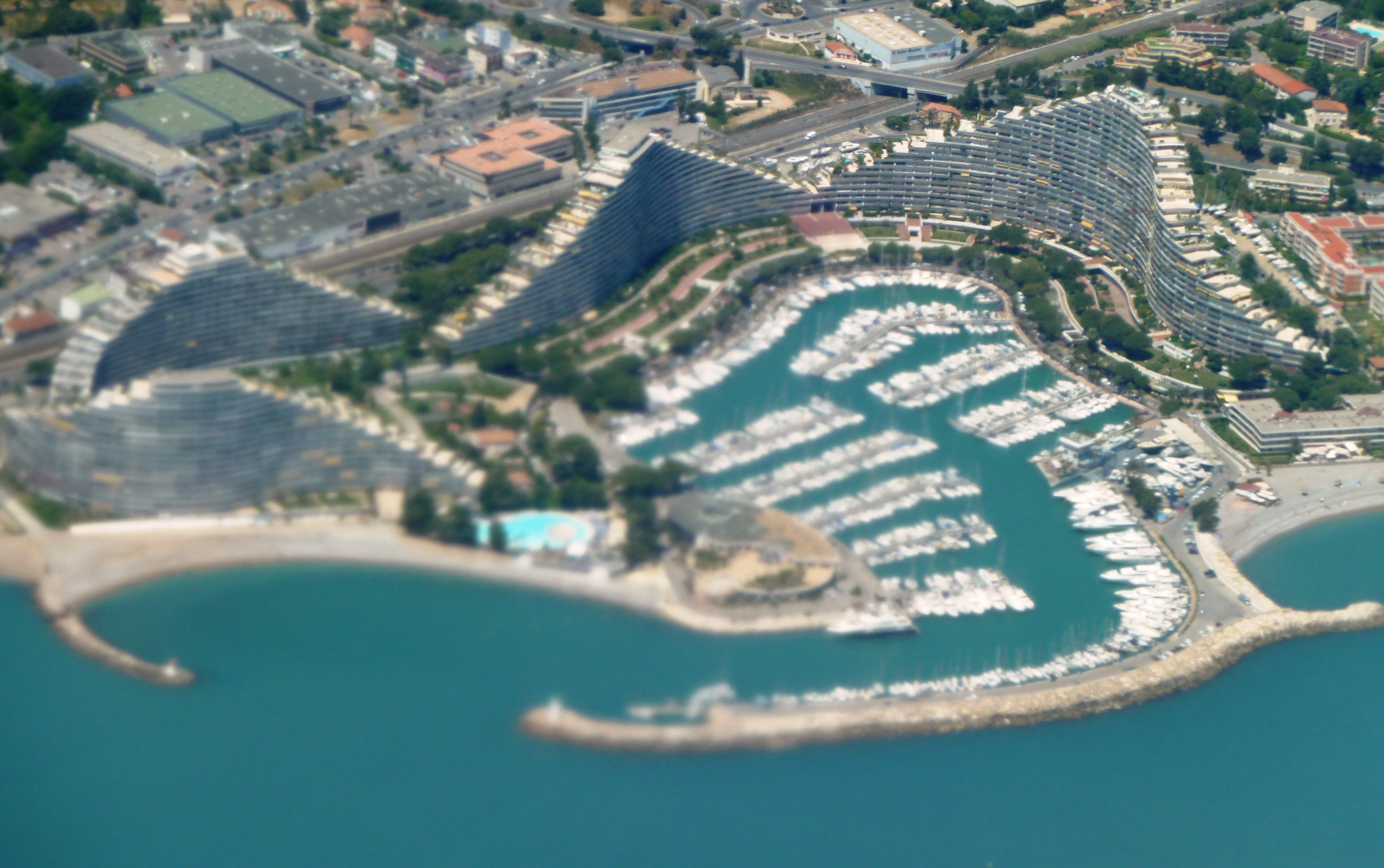
Marina Baie des Anges in Villeneuve-Loubet

== In popular culture ==
=== Cinema ===
- 1963: La Baie des Anges, directed by Jacques Demy, starring Jeanne Moreau and Claude Mann.
- 1995: Va mourire directed by Nicolas Boukhrief.
- 1997: Marie Baie des Anges directed by Manuel Pradal.
- 2005: Brice de Nice directed by James Huth, starring Jean Dujardin. This film also has a sequel, Brice 3, which was released in 2016.

=== Music ===
- 1984: Nice Baie des Anges, by Nicois singer Dick Rivers.
- 2011: Baie des Anges, by Julien Doré.

=== Comics ===
- 1965: In Le Tour de Gaule d'Astérix, by René Goscinny and Albert Uderzo, Asterix and Obelix passed through the Promenade des Bretons along the Bay of Angels in Nicaea (current Promenade des Anglais in Nice).

== See also ==
- List of bays of France
