= William Pierpont Black =

New Zealand wood carver, journalist

- Born: Wilhelm Peter Negrescu c. 1877; Bucharest, Romania
- Died: 29 April 1942; Auckland, New Zealand
- Occupations: Wood carver, journalist, journal editor, publisher
- Known for: Editorial and publishing work in New Zealand

William Pierpont Black (born Wilhelm Peter Negrescu; c. 1877 in Bucharest – 29 April 1942 in Auckland, New Zealand) was a New Zealand wood carver, journal editor and publisher, journalist. He was born in Bucharest, Romania in circa 1877.
