= Vionène =

River in France

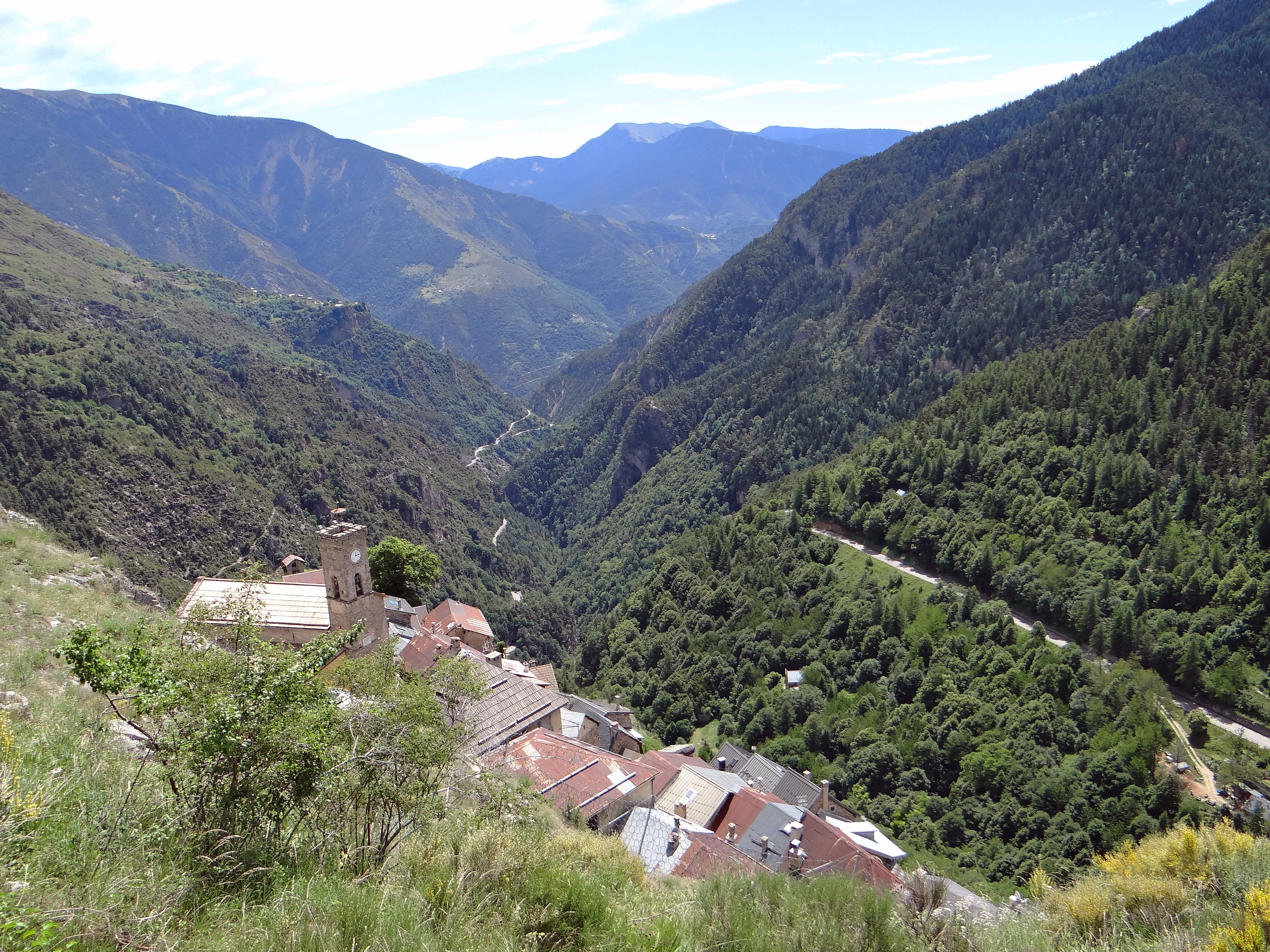

- Location within France Location within Provence-Alpes-Côte d'Azur

Location
- Country: France

Physical characteristics
- Mouth
  - location: Tinée
  - coordinates: 44°4′59″N 7°6′9″E
- Length: 17 km (11 mi)

Basin features
- Progression: Tinée→ Var→ Mediterranean Sea

The Vionène (French pronunciation: [vjɔnɛn]) is a small river that flows through the Alpes-Maritimes department of southeastern France. It flows into the Tinée in Saint-Sauveur-sur-Tinée. It is 16.7 km (10.4 mi) long.
