= Bouyon (river) =

- Location within France Location within Provence-Alpes-Côte d'Azur

Location
- Country: France

Physical characteristics
- Mouth
  - location: Estéron
  - coordinates: 43°50′29″N 7°8′29″E
- Length: 15 km (9 mi)

Basin features
- Progression: Estéron→ Var→ Mediterranean Sea

The Bouyon (French pronunciation: [bujɔ̃]) is a river that flows through the Alpes-Maritimes department of southeastern France. It is 15.4 km (9.6 mi) long. It flows into the river Estéron near the village Bouyon.
