= Aigue Blanche =

- Location within France Location within Provence-Alpes-Côte d'Azur

Location
- Country: France

Physical characteristics
- Source
  - location: Maritime Alps
- Mouth: Tuébi
  - coordinates: 44°6′52″N 6°54′26″E
- Length: 4.9 km (3.0 mi)

Basin features
- Progression: Tuébi→ Var→ Mediterranean Sea

The Aigue Blanche (French pronunciation: [ɛɡ blɑ̃ʃ]; also spelled: Aygue Blanche) is a short mountain river that flows through the Provence-Alpes-Côte d'Azur region of southeastern France. It lies completely within the department of Alpes-Maritimes and crosses three communes: Guillaumes, Beuil, and Péone.

Its source is in the Maritime Alps, and it flows into the river Tuébi, a tributary of the Var, in the village Péone.
