= Church of Saint-Arige-et-Saint-Vincent-de-Saragosse de Péone =

Catholic church in Péone, France

Coordinates: 44.1165°N 6.9060°E

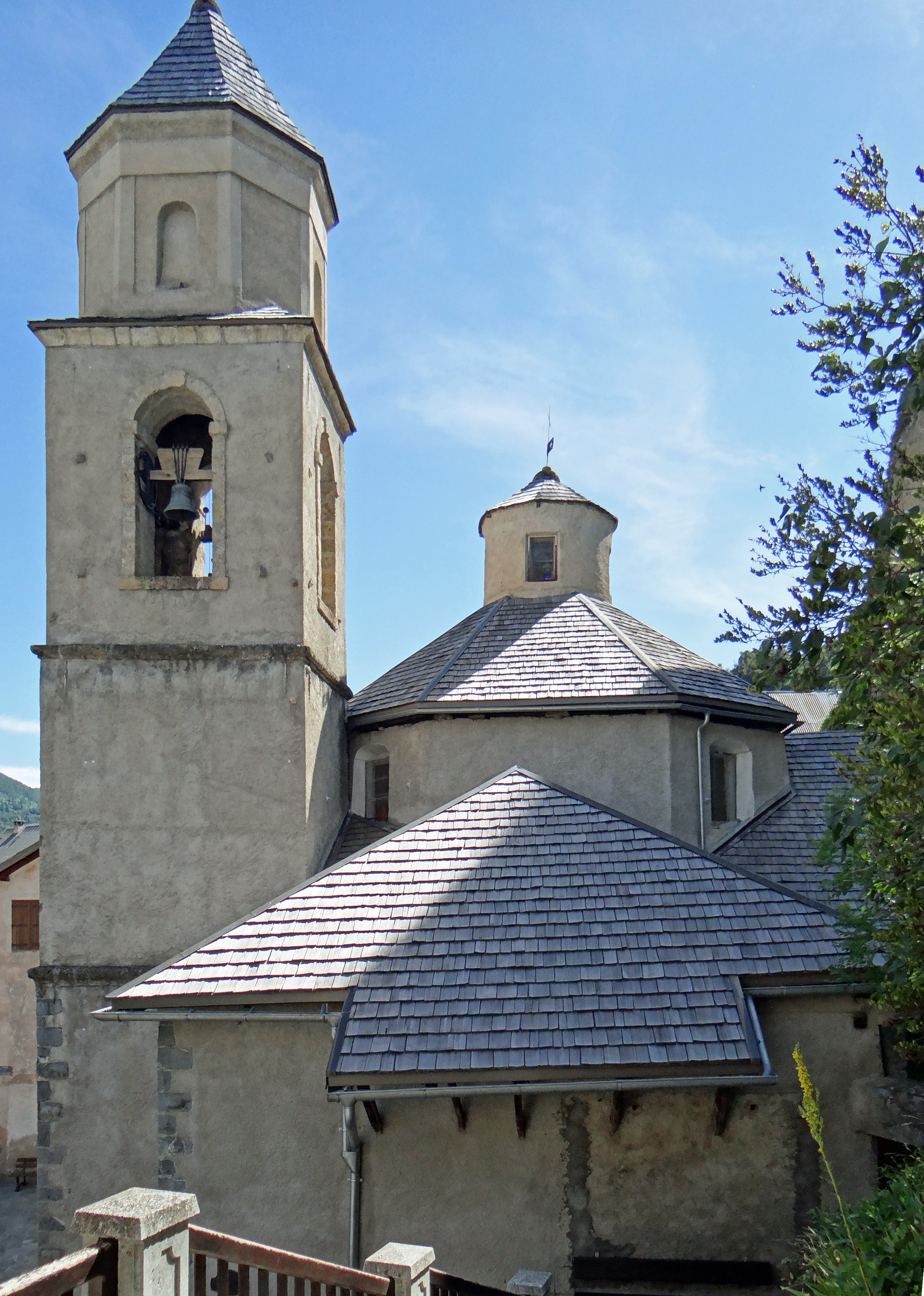
- Church of Saint-Arige-et-Saint-Vincent-de-Saragosse de Péone
- Interactive map of Church of Saint-Arige-et-Saint-Vincent-de-Saragosse de Péone

General information
- Type: Church
- Architectural style: Baroque
- Location: Rue de l'Église, Péone, France

The Church of Saint-Arige-et-Saint-Vincent-de-Saragosse de Péone is a Catholic church located within the municipality of Péone, in the French department of Alpes-Maritimes.

The building was registered as a monument historique on November 29, 1948.

== History ==
The first church was built in the 11th century.

The church was transformed and rebuilt in 1761 following the plans of the architect Pietro Antonio Santo Bartolomeo, a master Italian mason born in Lugano, Switzerland.

There remains from the previous building a lintel of a door engraved with the date 1550 and two lateral chapels covered by ogive arches, which were parts of the old nave whose central element disappeared during the transformation.

== Architecture ==
The church was built following a Greek cross plan. At the crossing of the transept, the church is surmounted by a hexagonal cupola, topped with a square lantern.

All of the interior decor, stucco, altarpieces, and paintings are in the Baroque style.

== Bibliography ==
- Philippe de Beauchamp, L'art religieux dans les Alpes-Maritimes, p. 95, Édisud, Aix-en-Provence, 1990 ISBN 2-85744-485-0
