= Valberg (ski resort) =

Ski resort in southern France

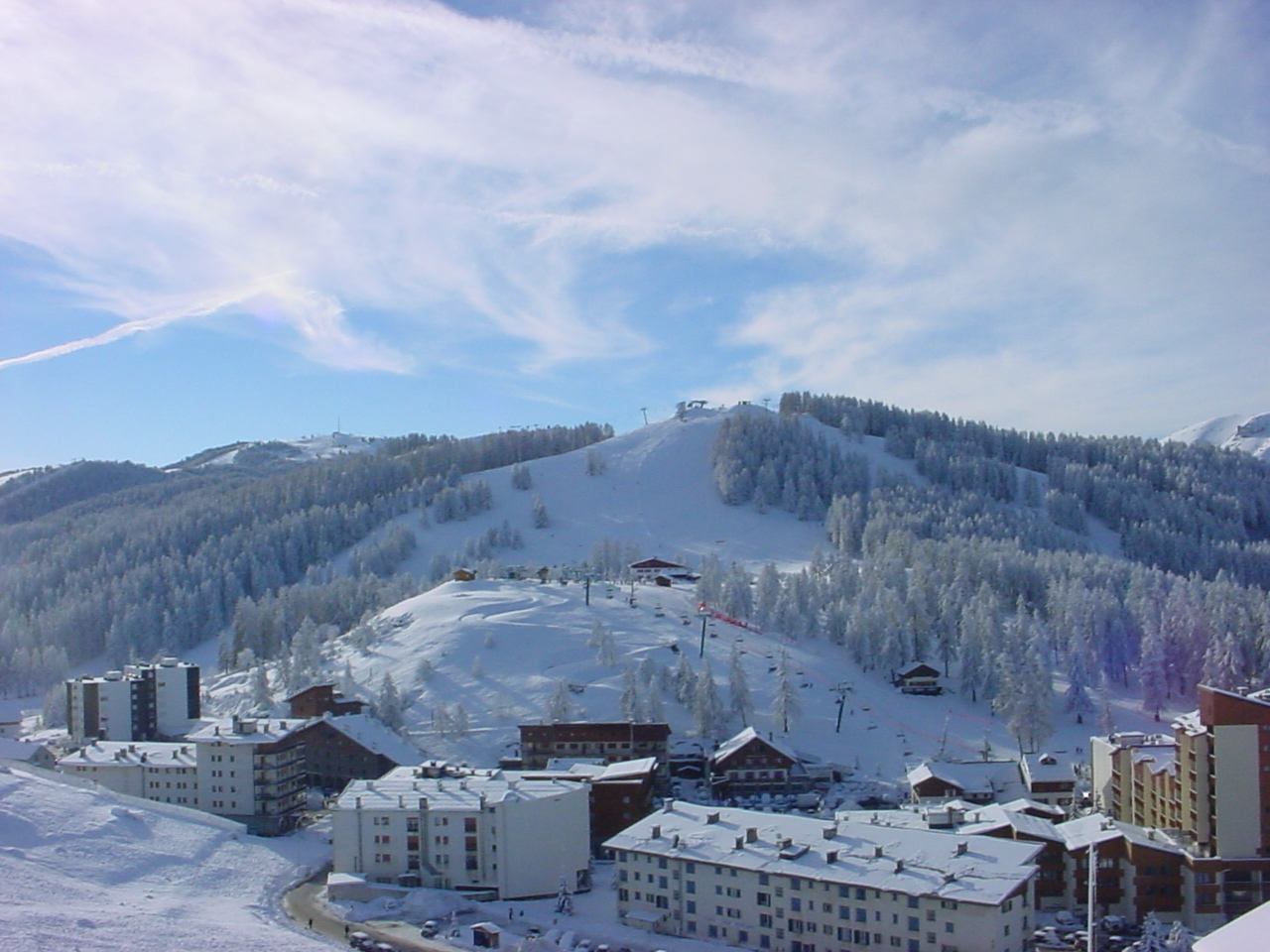
- General view

- Location within France Location within Provence-Alpes-Côte d'Azur Location within Alps
- Location: Provence-Alpes-Côte d'Azur, France
- Nearest city: Nice, France
- Coordinates: 44°05′43″N 06°55′44″E
- Top elevation: 2,675 metres (8,776 ft)
- Base elevation: 1,430 metres (4,690 ft)
- Trails: Black: 6 Red: 28; Blue: 11; Green: 11; 56 Total (90 kilometres (56 mi))
- Lift system: 7 Gondola lifts 16 Chair lifts 1 Rope lift 23 Total
- Terrain parks: Snowpark
- Snowmaking: Snow cannons
- Website: Valberg.com

Valberg (French pronunciation: [valbɛʁɡ]) is a ski resort in the French alps in the Alpes-Maritimes department. It is located on the towns of Guillaumes, Péone and Beuil.

Opened in 1936.
