= Rioulan =

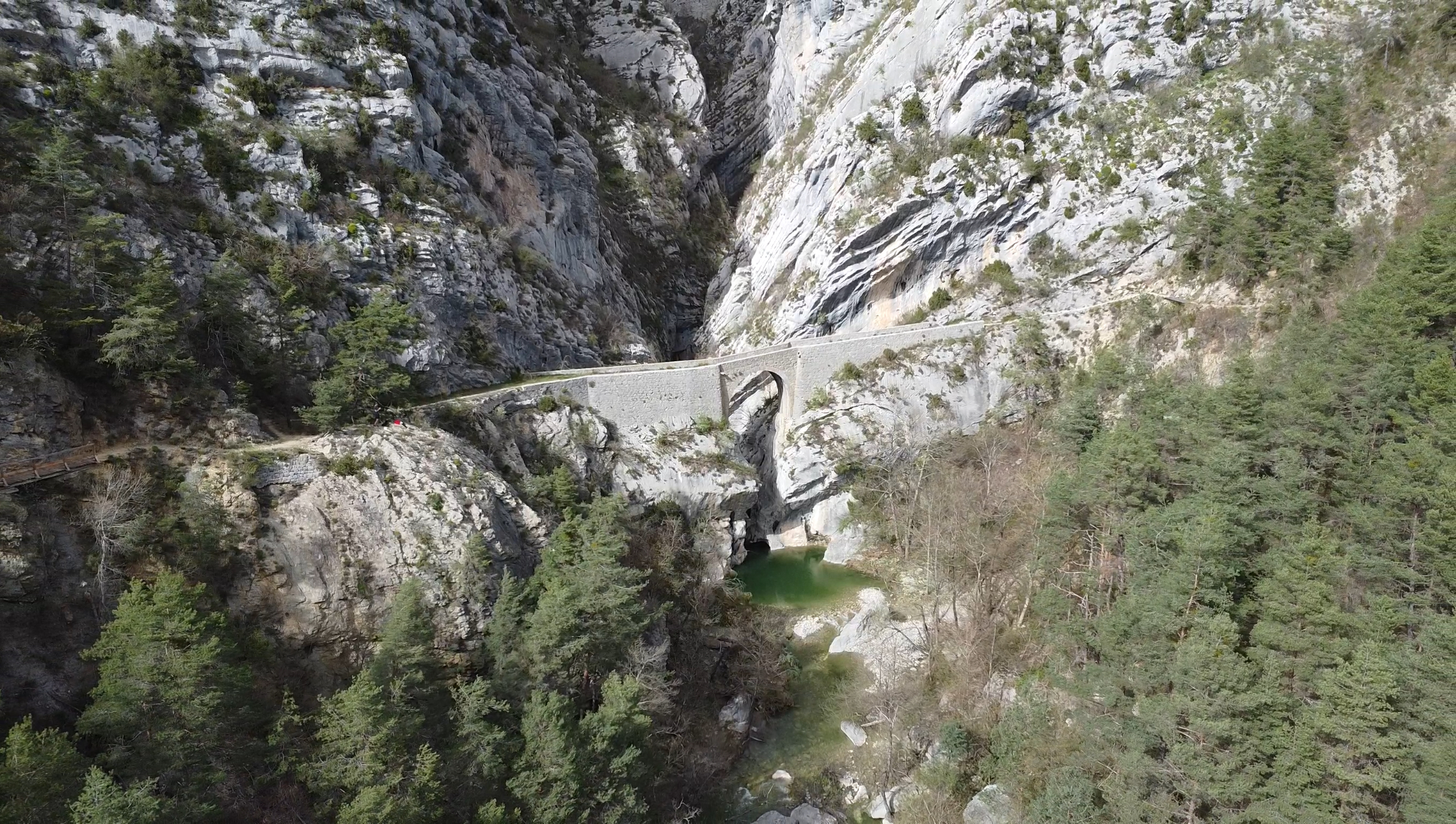

- Location within France Location within Provence-Alpes-Côte d'Azur

Location
- Country: France

Physical characteristics
- Mouth
  - location: Estéron
  - coordinates: 43°51′54″N 6°57′2″E
- Length: 12 km (7.5 mi)

Basin features
- Progression: Estéron→ Var→ Mediterranean Sea

The Rioulan (French pronunciation: [ʁjulɑ̃]) is a small river that flows through the Alpes-Maritimes department of southeastern France. It is 11.7 km (7.3 mi) long. It flows into the Estéron in Sigale.
