= Magnan (river) =

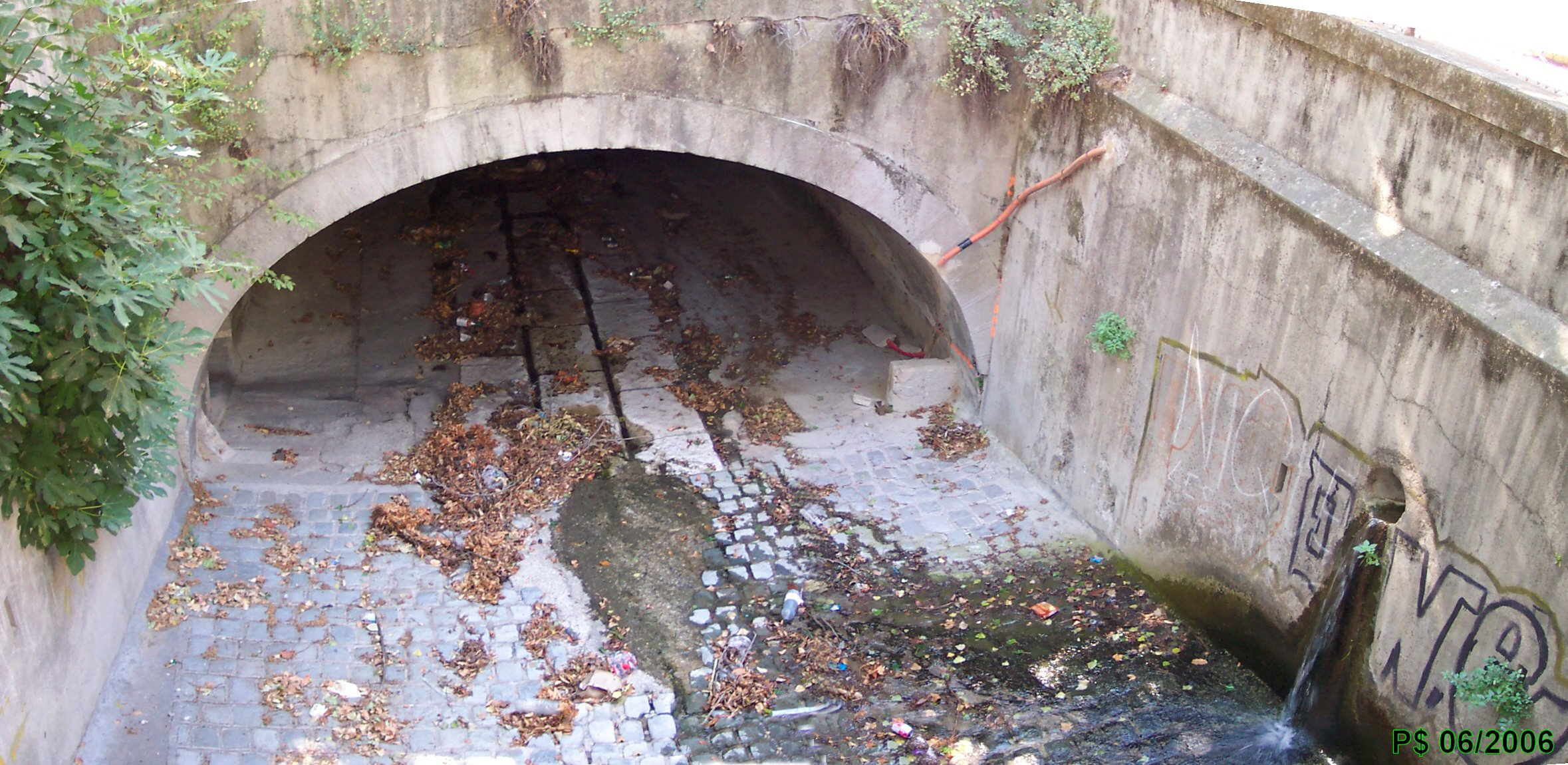

Location
- Country: France

Physical characteristics
- Mouth
  - location: Mediterranean Sea
  - coordinates: 43°41′25″N 7°14′45″E
- Length: 13 km (8 mi)

The Magnan is a small river that flows through the Alpes-Maritimes department of southeastern France. It is 12.7 km (7.9 mi) long. Its source is in Aspremont, and it flows into the Mediterranean Sea in Nice.
