= Mayola =

- Location within France Location within Provence-Alpes-Côte d'Azur

Location
- Country: France

Physical characteristics
- Mouth
  - location: Roudoule
  - coordinates: 43°58′6″N 6°53′5″E
- Length: 7 km (4 mi)

Basin features
- Progression: Roudoule→ Var→ Mediterranean Sea

The Mayola (also: Mairola) is a short mountain river that flows through the Alpes-Maritimes department of southeastern France. It is 7.0 km (4.3 mi) long. It passes through Puget-Rostang, and it flows into the Roudoule north of Puget-Théniers.
