= Fontanalba =

- Location within France Location within Provence-Alpes-Côte d'Azur

Location
- Country: France

Physical characteristics
- Mouth
  - location: Bieugne
  - coordinates: 44°5′49″N 7°30′26″E
- Length: 4.9 km (3.0 mi)

Basin features
- Progression: Bieugne→ Roya→ Ligurian Sea

The Fontanalba is a short mountain river that flows through the Alpes-Maritimes department of southeastern France. It is 4.9 km (3.0 mi) long. It flows in the mountains west of Tende. It is a tributary of the Bieugne, which is a tributary of the Roya. Together with the Vallée des merveilles on the west side of Mont Bégo, the Fontanalba valley forms a protected area, known for Bronze Age petroglyphs.
