= Malvan (river) =

- Location within France Location within Provence-Alpes-Côte d'Azur

Location
- Country: France

Physical characteristics
- Mouth: Cagne
  - coordinates: 43°39′25″N 7°9′12″E
- Length: 16.6 km (10 mi)

Basin features
- Progression: Cagne→ Mediterranean Sea

The Malvan (French pronunciation: [malvɑ̃]) is a small river that flows through the Alpes-Maritimes department of southeastern France. Its source is in Vence, and it flows into the Cagne in Cagnes-sur-Mer. It is 16.6 km (10.3 mi) long.
