= Valmasque =

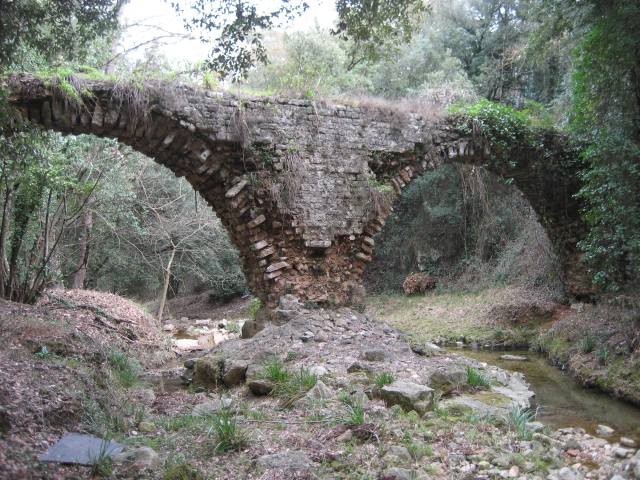

Location
- Country: France

Physical characteristics
- Mouth
  - location: Brague
  - coordinates: 43°37′4″N 7°6′14″E
- Length: 8.4 km (5 mi)

Basin features
- Progression: Brague→ Mediterranean Sea

The Valmasque is a small river that flows through the Alpes-Maritimes department of southeastern France. It is 8.4 km (5.2 mi) long. It flows into the Brague in Biot.
