= Roudoule =

Roudoule Ravin de l'Ados
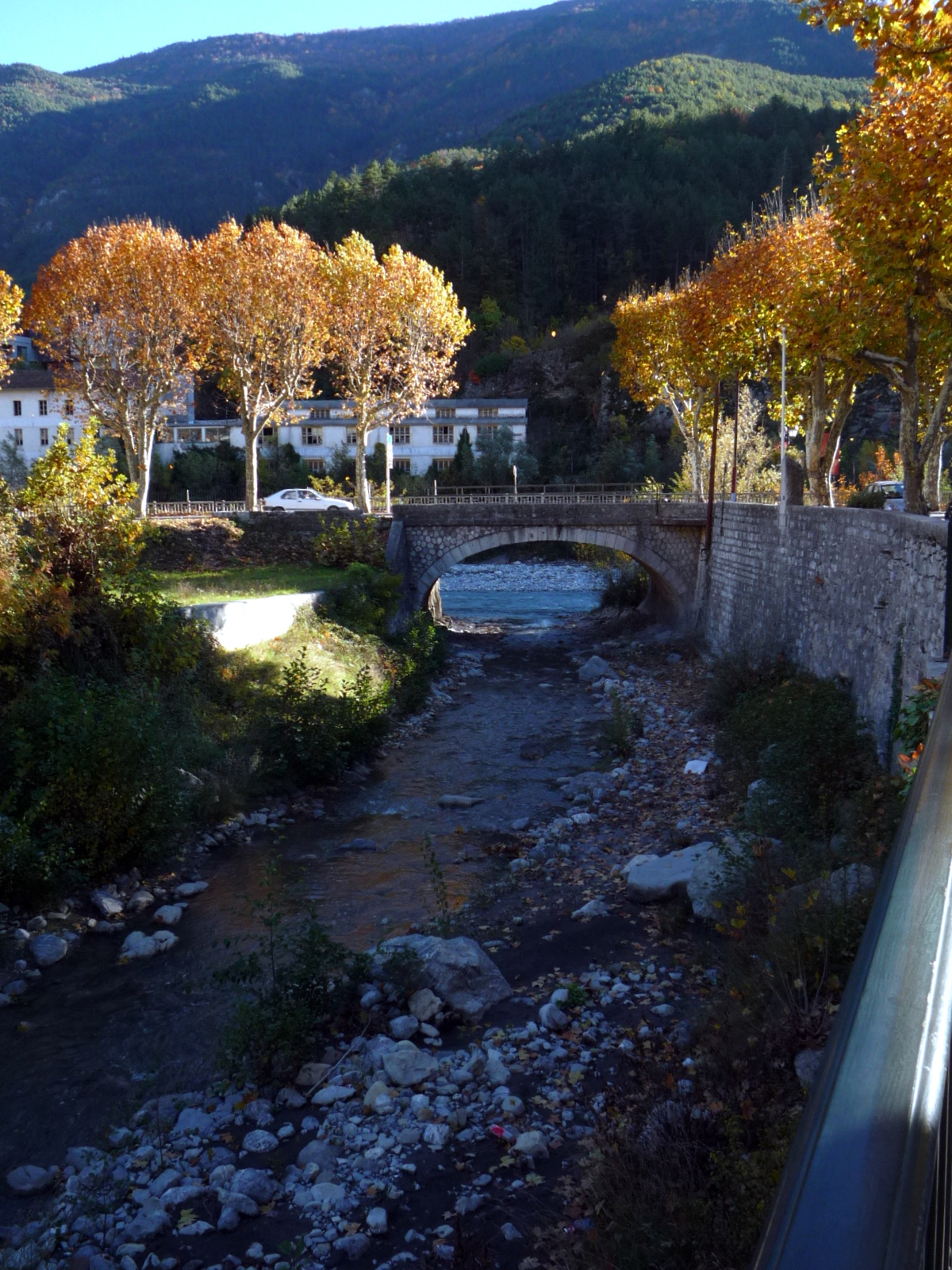

- Location within France Location within Provence-Alpes-Côte d'Azur

Location
- Country: France

Physical characteristics
- Source: du dôme du Barrot
  - coordinates: 44°2′7″N 6°55′0″E
  - elevation: 1,160 m (3,810 ft)
- Mouth
  - location: Var
  - coordinates: 43°57′17″N 6°53′39″E
- Length: 13.1 km (8.1 mi)

Basin features
- Progression: Var→ Mediterranean Sea

The Roudoule (French pronunciation: [ʁudul]; Occitan: Rodola) is a 13.1-kilometre (8.1 mi) long river that flows through the Alpes-Maritimes department of south-eastern France. It flows into the Var in Puget-Théniers. The Mayola is one of its tributaries.
