= Tinée =

River in Southern France

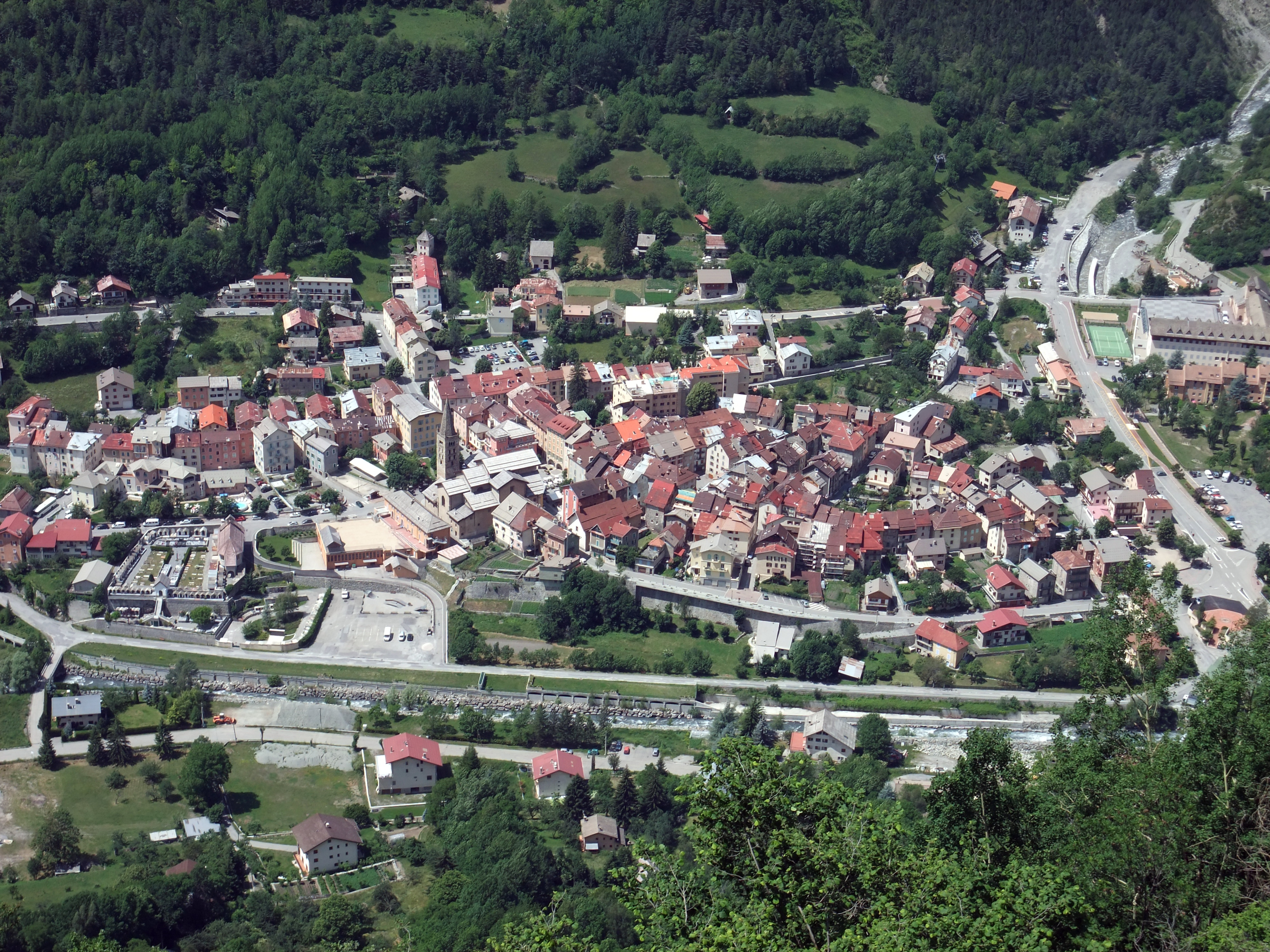

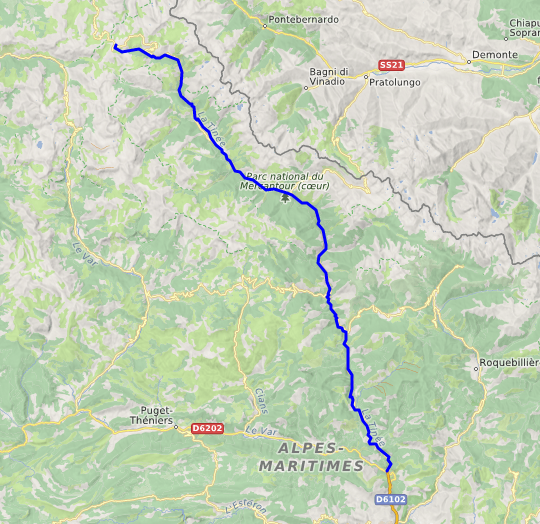

Location
- Country: France

Physical characteristics
- Source
  - location: Maritime Alps
  - elevation: 2,700 m (8,900 ft)
- Mouth
  - location: Var
  - coordinates: 43°54′42″N 7°11′7″E
- Length: 70 km (43 mi)
- Basin size: 743 km^{2} (287 sq mi)

Basin features
- Progression: Var→ Mediterranean Sea

The Tinée (French pronunciation: [tine]; Occitan: Tiniá) is a river that flows through the Alpes-Maritimes department of southeastern France. It is 69.9 km (43.4 mi) long. Its drainage basin is 743 km^{2} (287 sq mi). Its source is on the east side of the Col de la Bonette, in the Maritime Alps. It flows through Saint-Étienne-de-Tinée, Isola and Saint-Sauveur-sur-Tinée, and it flows into the Var near Utelle. The Guercha and the Vionène are its tributaries.
