= Minière =

- Location within France Location within Provence-Alpes-Côte d'Azur

Location
- Country: France

Physical characteristics
- Mouth
  - location: Bieugne
  - coordinates: 44°4′14″N 7°31′20″E
- Length: 9 km (6 mi)

Basin features
- Progression: Bieugne→ Roya→ Ligurian Sea

The Minière (French pronunciation: [minjɛʁ]) is a short mountain river that flows through the Alpes-Maritimes department of southeastern France. It is 8.7 km (5.4 mi) long. It flows into the Bieugne (a tributary of the Roya) west of Tende, where a dam forms the Lac des Mesches.
