= Brague =

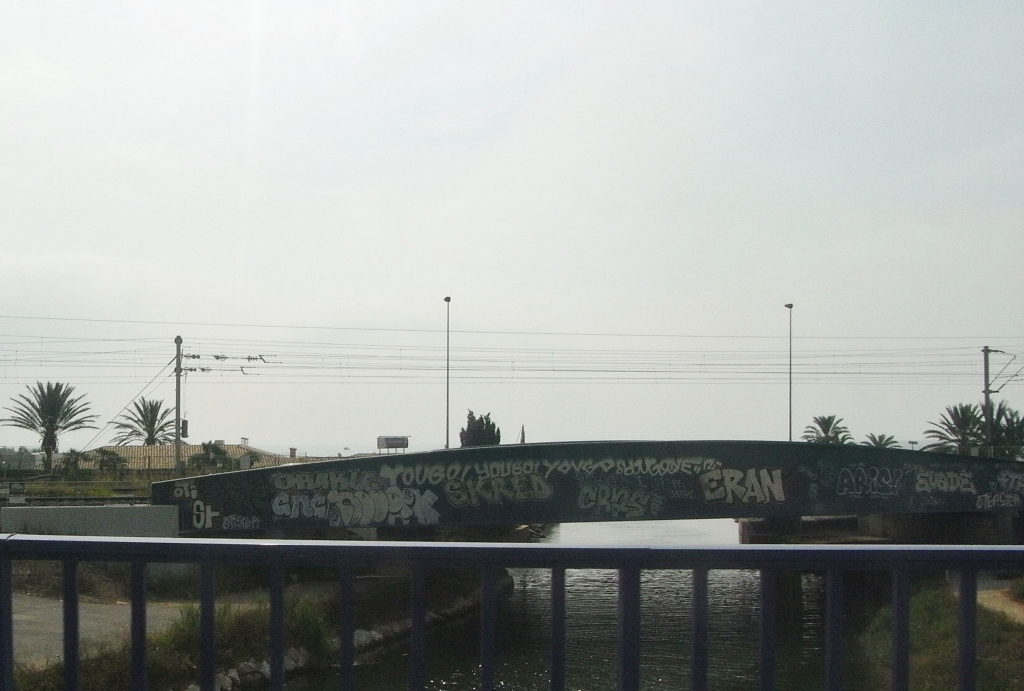

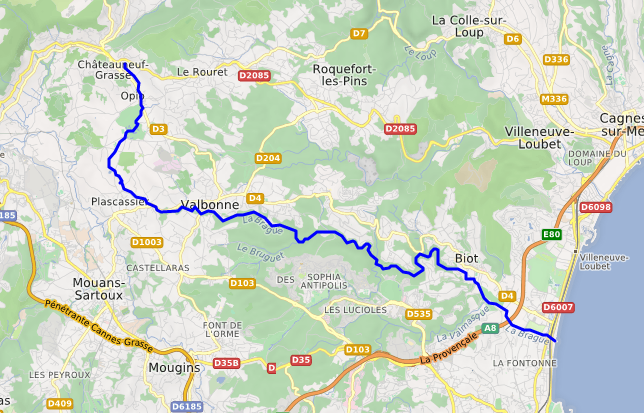
- Course of the Brague

Location
- Country: France
- Région: Provence-Alpes-Côte d'Azur
- Département: Alpes-Maritimes

Physical characteristics
- Mouth: Mediterranean Sea
  - location: near Antibes
  - coordinates: 43.6078°N 7.1271°E
- Length: 21.0 km (13.0 mi)

Basin features
- Tributaries
  - right: Valmasque

The Brague (French pronunciation: [bʁaɡ]) is a river in the département of Alpes-Maritimes and the région of Provence-Alpes-Côte d'Azur in France. The Brague takes its source near Châteauneuf-Grasse and ends in the Mediterranean Sea near Antibes.

Between Valbonne and Biot, a 9-kilometre (6 mi) long path follows the river. Part of the Brague Valley is covered by a park called the "Parc Départemental de la Brague".

The Brague is 21.0 kilometres (13.0 mi) long.
