= Borrigo =

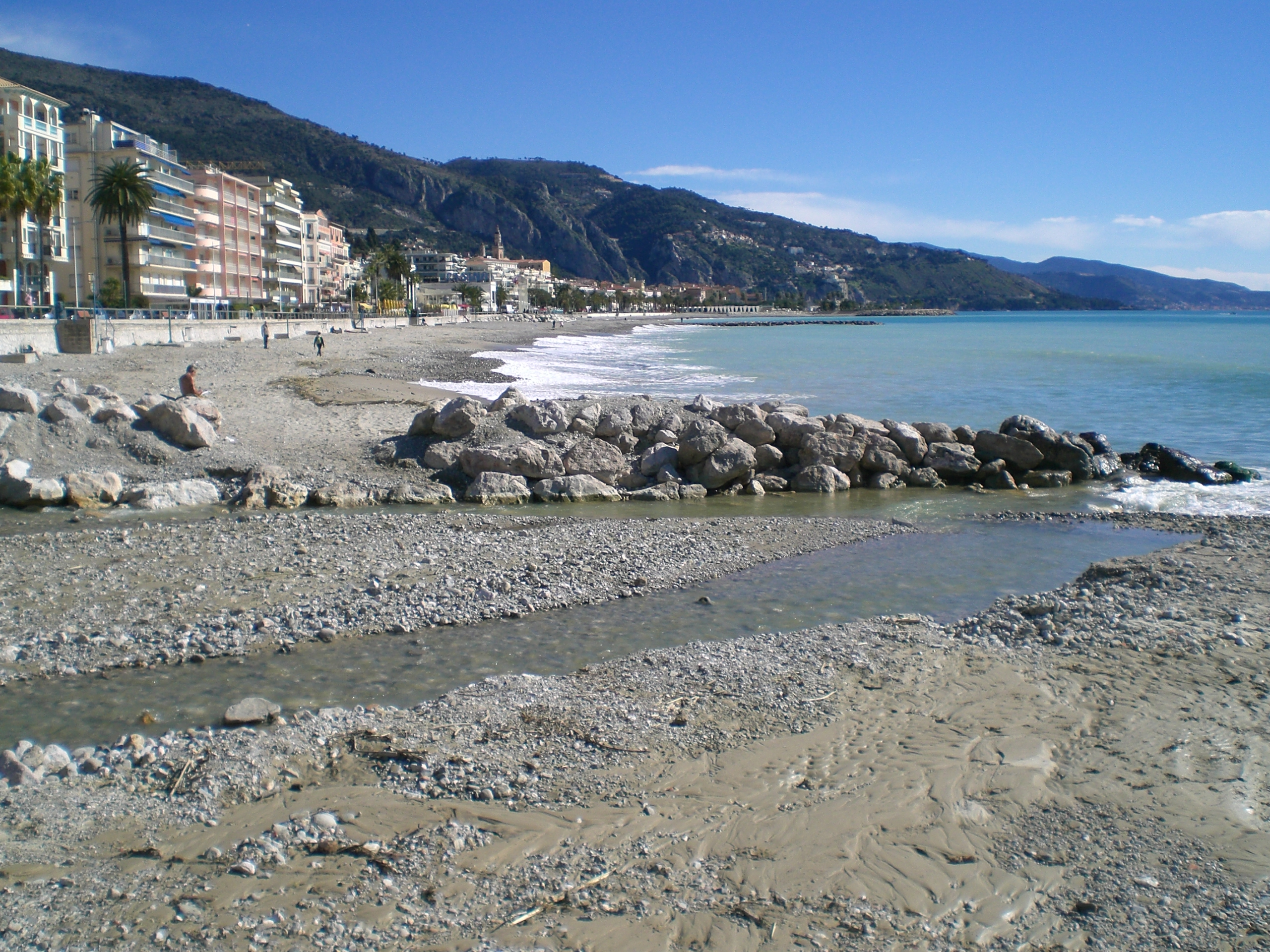

Location
- Country: France

Physical characteristics
- Mouth
  - location: Mediterranean Sea
  - coordinates: 43°46′13″N 7°29′41″E
- Length: 8.4 km (5.2 mi)

The Borrigo (French pronunciation: [bɔʁiɡo]) is a river that flows through the Alpes-Maritimes department of southeastern France. It is 8.4 km (5.2 mi) long. Its source is in Sainte-Agnès, and it flows into the Mediterranean Sea in Menton.
