= Saint-Étienne-de-Tinée =

Commune in Provence-Alpes-Côte d'Azur, France

- Commune
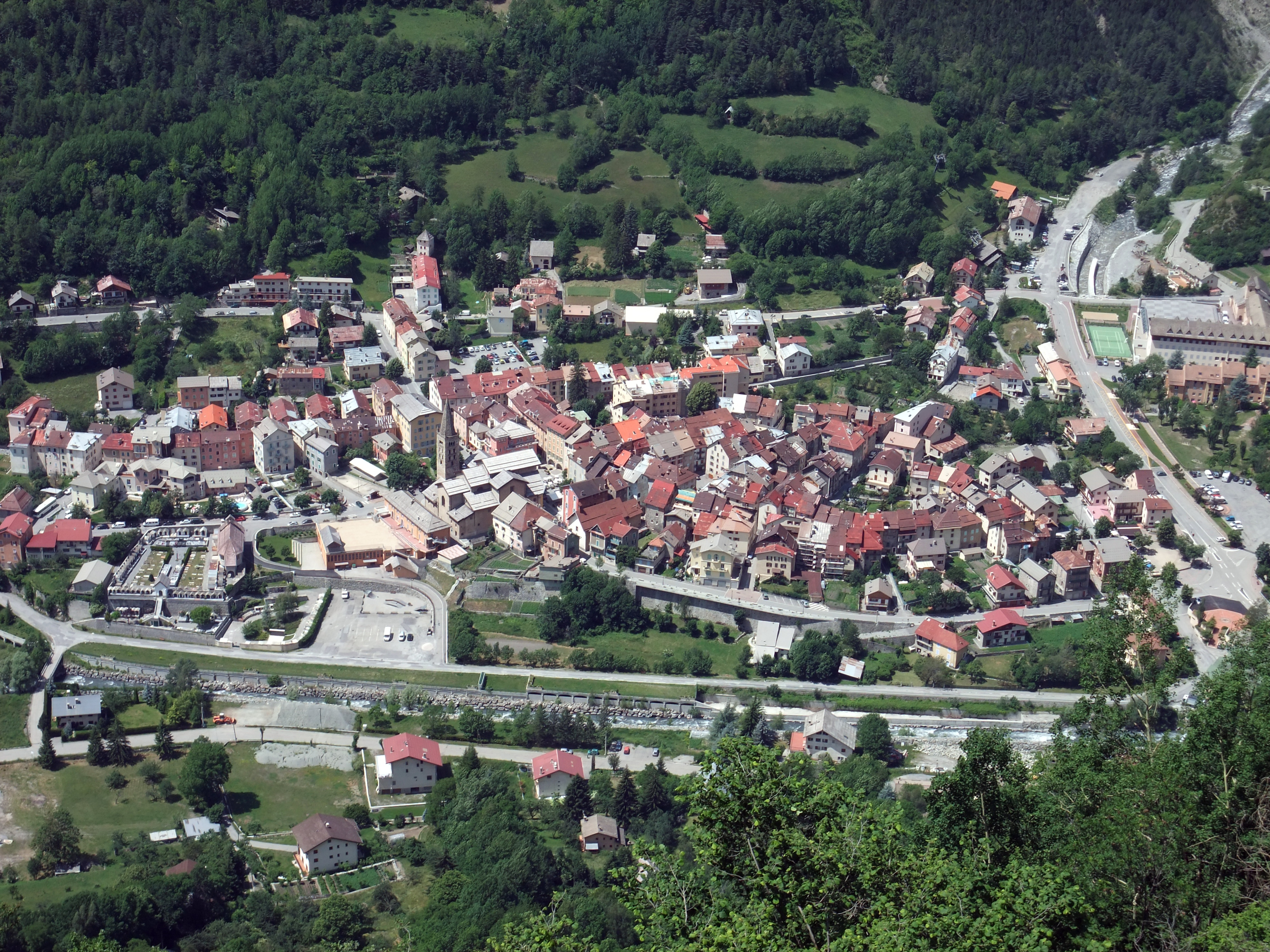
- A view of the village from the hillside to the east

- Coat of arms
- Location of Saint-Étienne-de-Tinée
- Location within France Location within Provence-Alpes-Côte d'Azur
- Coordinates: 44°15′28″N 6°55′31″E
- Country: France
- Region: Provence-Alpes-Côte d'Azur
- Department: Alpes-Maritimes
- Arrondissement: Nice
- Canton: Tourrette-Levens
- Intercommunality: Métropole Nice Côte d'Azur

Government
  - Mayor (2026–32): Colette Fabron
- Area^{1}: 173.81 km^{2} (67.11 sq mi)
- Elevation: 1,142 m (3,747 ft)
- Highest elevation: 3,027 m (9,931 ft)
- Lowest elevation: 949 m (3,114 ft)
- Population (2023): 1,289
  - Density: 7.416/km^{2} (19.21/sq mi)
- Time zone: UTC+01:00 (CET)
  - Summer (DST): UTC+02:00 (CEST)
- INSEE/Postal code: 06120 /06660
- ^{1} French Land Register data, which excludes lakes, ponds, glaciers > 1 km^{2} (0.386 sq mi or 247 acres) and river estuaries.

Saint-Étienne-de-Tinée (French pronunciation: [sɛ̃.t‿etjɛn də tine], literally Saint-Étienne of Tinée; Italian: Santo Stefano di Tinea; Vivaro-Alpine: Sant Estève d'en Tiniá) is a commune in the Alpes-Maritimes department in southeastern France.

It was part of the historic County of Nice until 1860.

== Auron ==
Auron
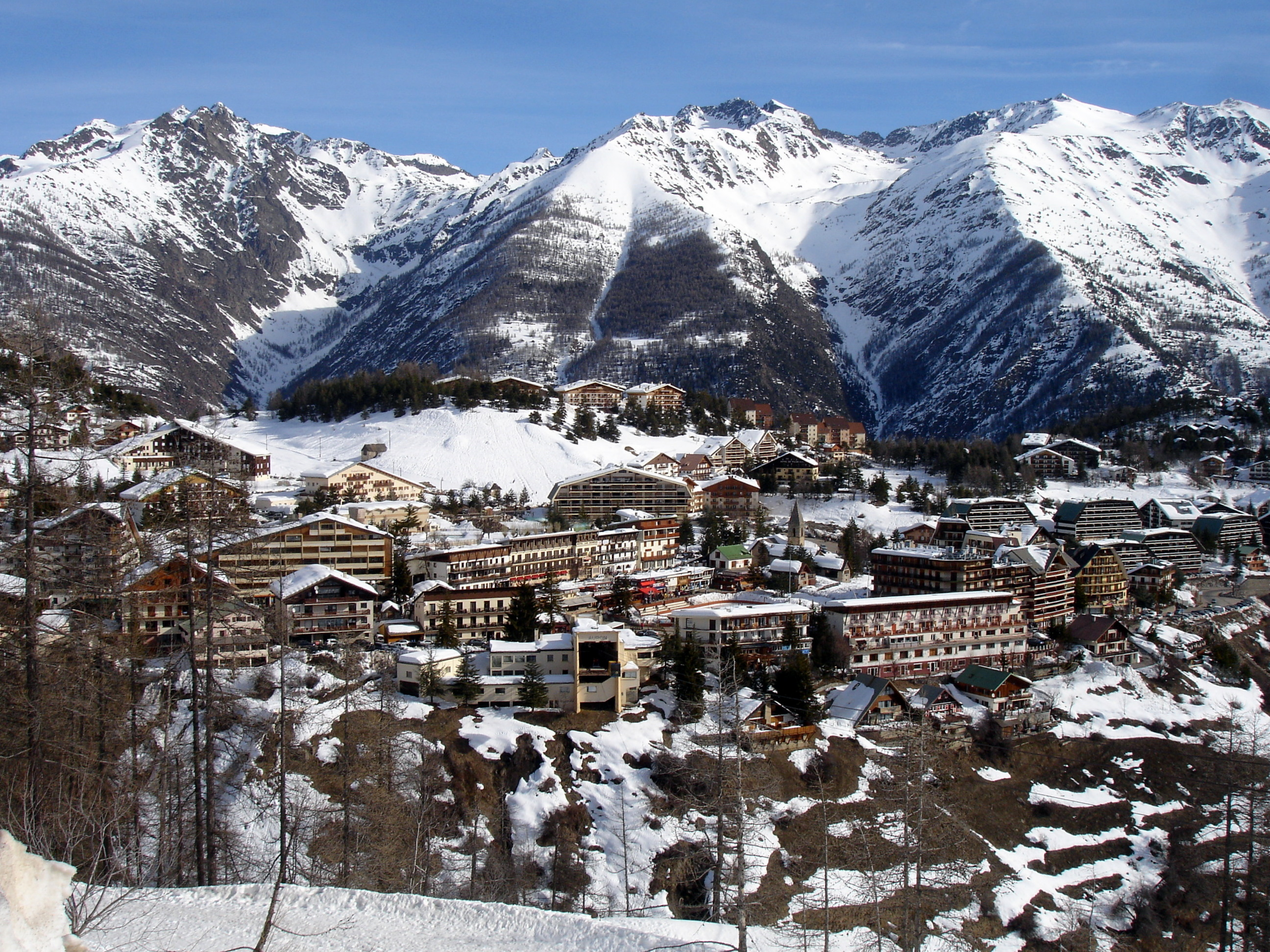
- General view of Auron village

- Location within France Location within Provence-Alpes-Côte d'Azur Location within Alps
- Location: Provence-Alpes-Côte d'Azur, France
- Nearest city: Nice, France
- Coordinates: 44°13′30″N 06°55′51″E
- Vertical: c. 850 metres (2,790 ft)
- Top elevation: 2,452 metres (8,045 ft)
- Base elevation: 1,600 metres (5,200 ft)
- Trails: Black: 9 Red: 15; Blue: 16; Green: 3; 43 Total (135 kilometres (84 mi))
- Longest run: 5 kilometres (3.1 mi)
- Lift system: 3 Gondola lifts 9 Chair lifts 3 Button lifts 1 Rope lift 18 Total
- Lift capacity: c. 21,000 pph
- Terrain parks: Snowpark
- Snowmaking: Snow cannons
- Night skiing: Occasionally on one slope
- Website: Auron.com

The ski resort of Auron is located on the territory of the commune, and linked to the village of Saint-Étienne-de-Tinée directly by a gondola lift.

== Population ==
Historical population
Year	Pop.	±% p.a.
1968	1,549	—
1975	1,700	+1.34%
1982	1,780	+0.66%
1990	1,783	+0.02%
1999	1,528	−1.70%
2007	1,320	−1.81%
2012	1,298	−0.34%
2017	1,531	+3.36%
2023	1,289	−2.83%
Source: INSEE

== See also ==
- Communes of the Alpes-Maritimes department
