= Guercha =

- Location within France Location within Provence-Alpes-Côte d'Azur

Location
- Country: France

Physical characteristics
- Mouth
  - location: Tinée
  - coordinates: 44°11′3″N 7°3′12″E
- Length: 6.5 km (4.0 mi)

Basin features
- Progression: Tinée→ Var→ Mediterranean Sea

The Guercha (French pronunciation: [ɡɛʁʃa]) is a short mountain river that flows through the Alpes-Maritimes department of southeastern France. It is 6.5 km (4.0 mi) long. Its source is in the Maritime Alps, close to the Italian border. It flows into the Tinée in Isola.
