= Lubiane =

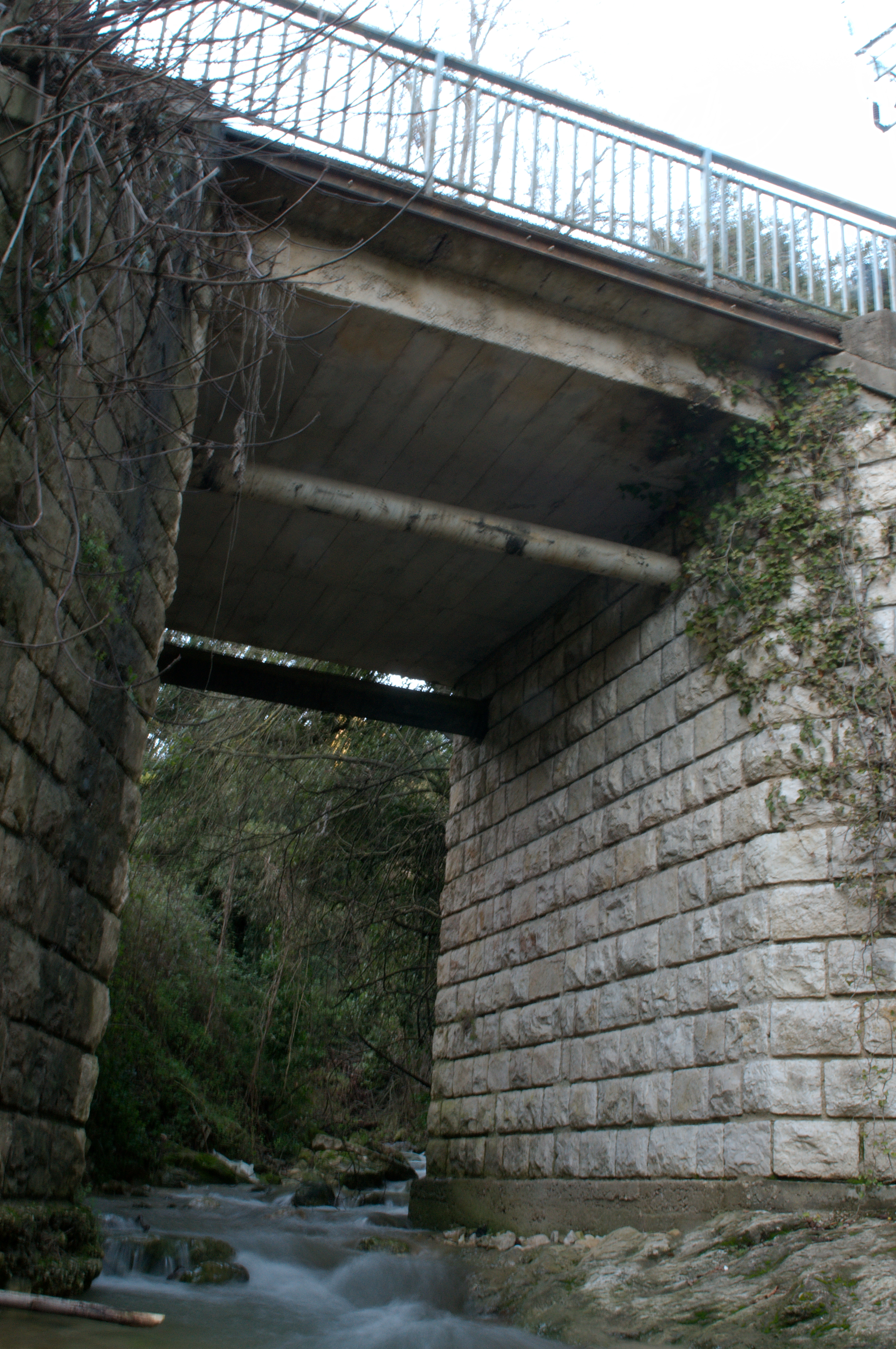

- Location within France Location within Provence-Alpes-Côte d'Azur

Location
- Country: France

Physical characteristics
- Mouth: Cagne
  - coordinates: 43°43′8″N 7°8′25″E
- Length: 7.3 km (5 mi)

Basin features
- Progression: Cagne→ Mediterranean Sea

The Lubiane (French pronunciation: [lybjan]) is a small river that flows through the Alpes-Maritimes department of southeastern France. It flows entirely within the town of Vence. It is a right tributary of the Cagne. It is 7.3 km (4.5 mi) long.
