= Roquestéron =

Commune in Provence-Alpes-Côte d'Azur, France

Roquestéron Roquesteron (Occitan)
- Commune
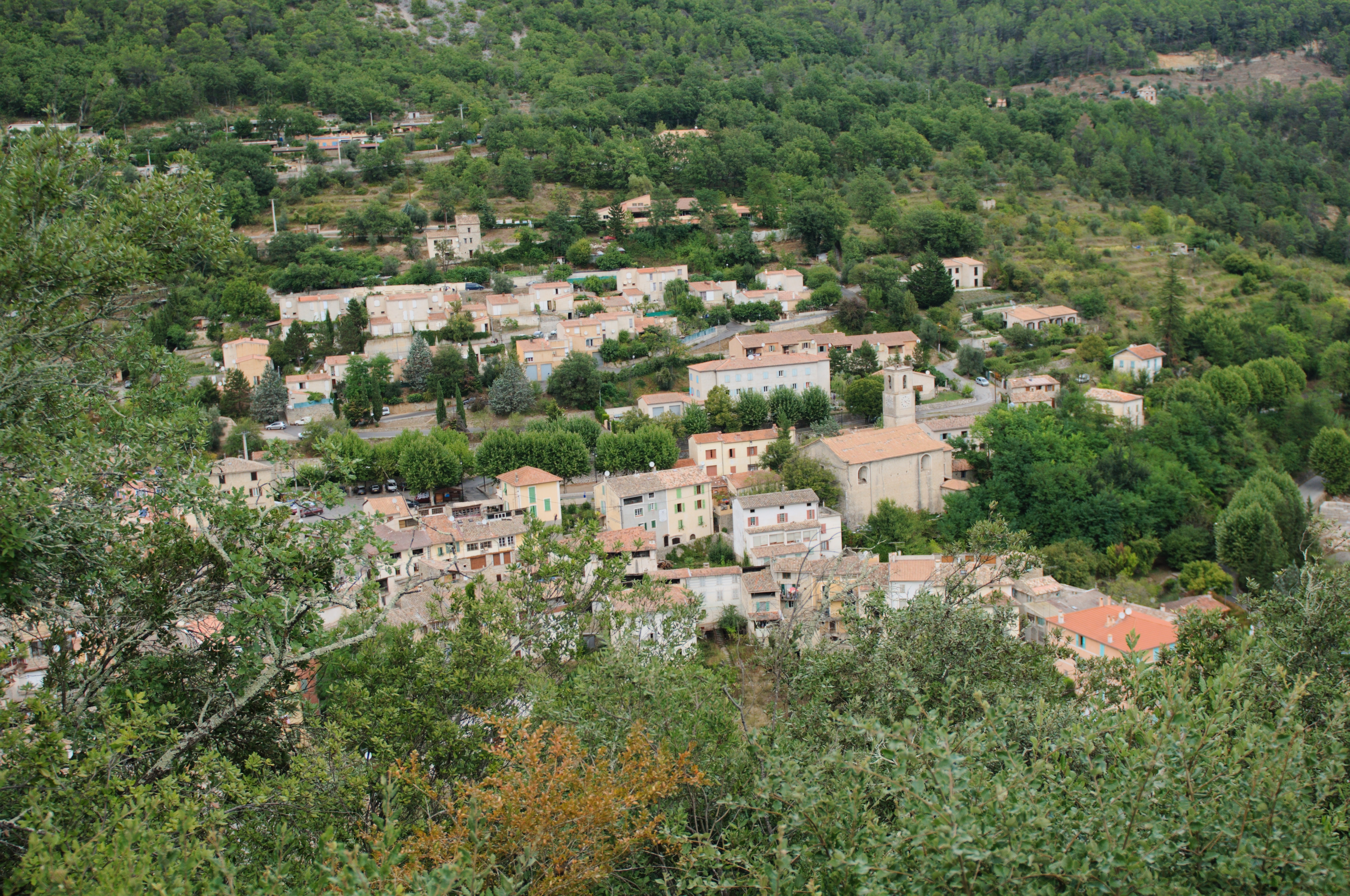
- A view of Roquestéron from the nearby hillside

- Coat of arms
- Location of Roquestéron
- Location within France Location within Provence-Alpes-Côte d'Azur
- Coordinates: 43°52′29″N 7°00′19″E
- Country: France
- Region: Provence-Alpes-Côte d'Azur
- Department: Alpes-Maritimes
- Arrondissement: Nice
- Canton: Vence
- Intercommunality: CC Alpes d'Azur

Government
  - Mayor (2026–32): Danièle Chabaud
- Area^{1}: 6.47 km^{2} (2.50 sq mi)
- Elevation: 340 m (1,120 ft)
- Highest elevation: 1,040 m (3,410 ft)
- Lowest elevation: 270 m (890 ft)
- Population (2023): 552
  - Density: 85.3/km^{2} (221/sq mi)
- Demonym: Roquérois
- Time zone: UTC+01:00 (CET)
  - Summer (DST): UTC+02:00 (CEST)
- INSEE/Postal code: 06106 /06910
- Website: roquesteron.fr
- ^{1} French Land Register data, which excludes lakes, ponds, glaciers > 1 km^{2} (0.386 sq mi or 247 acres) and river estuaries.

Roquestéron (French pronunciation: [ʁɔkɛsteʁɔ̃]; Occitan: Roquesteron; Italian, formerly: Roccasterone) is a rural commune on the Estéron river in the Alpes-Maritimes department in Southeastern France. It is part of Préalpes d'Azur Regional Natural Park.

== History ==
It was part of the historic County of Nice until 1860 as Roccasterone.

== Population ==
Historical population
| Year | Pop. | ±% p.a. |
|---|---|---|
| 1968 | 422 | — |
| 1975 | 404 | −0.62% |
| 1982 | 428 | +0.83% |
| 1990 | 509 | +2.19% |
| 1999 | 478 | −0.70% |
| 2007 | 520 | +1.06% |
| 2012 | 559 | +1.46% |
| 2017 | 581 | +0.78% |
| 2023 | 552 | −0.85% |
Source: INSEE

== Climate ==
Roquestéron had a weather station between 1987 and 2008. It has a humid subtropical climate (Köppen Cfa) characterized by volatile temperatures, heavy precipitation varied with dry spells, and high diurnal temperature variation.

Climate data for Roquestéron (1987–2008 normals & extremes)
| Month | Jan | Feb | Mar | Apr | May | Jun | Jul | Aug | Sep | Oct | Nov | Dec | Year |
|---|---|---|---|---|---|---|---|---|---|---|---|---|---|
| Record high °C (°F) | 27.1 (80.8) | 25.6 (78.1) | 26.8 (80.2) | 28.1 (82.6) | 32.6 (90.7) | 35.8 (96.4) | 36.7 (98.1) | 40.1 (104.2) | 34.7 (94.5) | 30.4 (86.7) | 24.6 (76.3) | 22.2 (72.0) | 40.1 (104.2) |
| Mean daily maximum °C (°F) | 11.6 (52.9) | 13.8 (56.8) | 17.0 (62.6) | 18.6 (65.5) | 23.4 (74.1) | 27.3 (81.1) | 30.7 (87.3) | 31.1 (88.0) | 26.2 (79.2) | 21.0 (69.8) | 15.0 (59.0) | 11.2 (52.2) | 20.6 (69.1) |
| Daily mean °C (°F) | 5.6 (42.1) | 6.9 (44.4) | 9.9 (49.8) | 11.7 (53.1) | 16.3 (61.3) | 19.9 (67.8) | 22.7 (72.9) | 23.0 (73.4) | 18.8 (65.8) | 14.8 (58.6) | 9.1 (48.4) | 5.7 (42.3) | 13.8 (56.8) |
| Mean daily minimum °C (°F) | −0.5 (31.1) | -0.0 (32.0) | 2.7 (36.9) | 4.9 (40.8) | 9.2 (48.6) | 12.4 (54.3) | 14.6 (58.3) | 14.8 (58.6) | 11.3 (52.3) | 8.4 (47.1) | 3.3 (37.9) | 0.1 (32.2) | 6.8 (44.2) |
| Record low °C (°F) | −8.5 (16.7) | −8.0 (17.6) | −9.3 (15.3) | −2.0 (28.4) | −0.6 (30.9) | 4.7 (40.5) | 8.0 (46.4) | 8.0 (46.4) | 3.0 (37.4) | −1.4 (29.5) | −7.1 (19.2) | −9.4 (15.1) | −9.4 (15.1) |
| Average precipitation mm (inches) | 87.9 (3.46) | 48.8 (1.92) | 45.4 (1.79) | 90.0 (3.54) | 78.1 (3.07) | 52.0 (2.05) | 35.1 (1.38) | 46.5 (1.83) | 100.1 (3.94) | 148.0 (5.83) | 135.2 (5.32) | 91.2 (3.59) | 964.5 (37.97) |
| Average precipitation days | 5.9 | 3.9 | 4.7 | 9.0 | 8.0 | 6.0 | 4.4 | 4.7 | 6.2 | 7.9 | 7.4 | 5.3 | 73.3 |
Source 1: Météo Climat
Source 2: Météo Climat

== See also ==
- Communes of the Alpes-Maritimes department
