= Cagne =

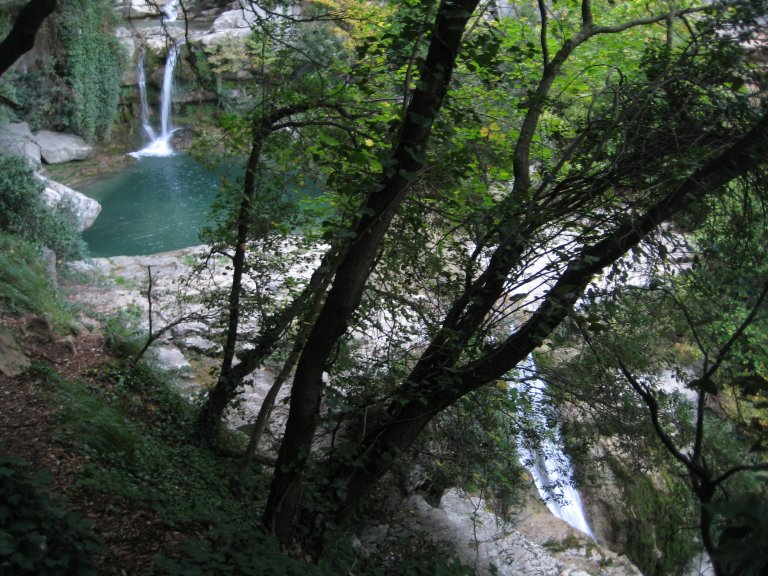

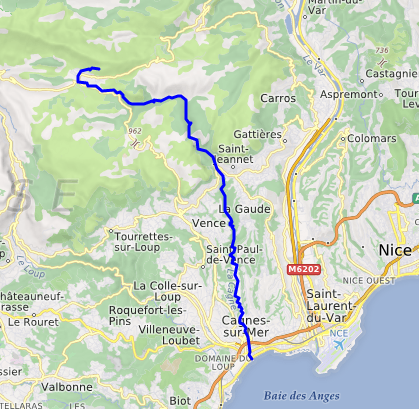

Location
- Country: France

Physical characteristics
- Mouth: Mediterranean Sea
  - coordinates: 43.6526°N 7.1554°E
- Length: 28 km (17 mi)

Basin features
- Tributaries
  - right: Lubiane, Malvan

The Cagne (French pronunciation: [kaɲ]) is a river that flows through the Alpes-Maritimes department of southeastern France. Its source is near Coursegoules, and it flows into the Mediterranean Sea in Cagnes-sur-Mer. It is 27.5 km (17.1 mi) long. The Malvan is one of its tributaries.
