= Arrondissements of the Alpes-Maritimes department =

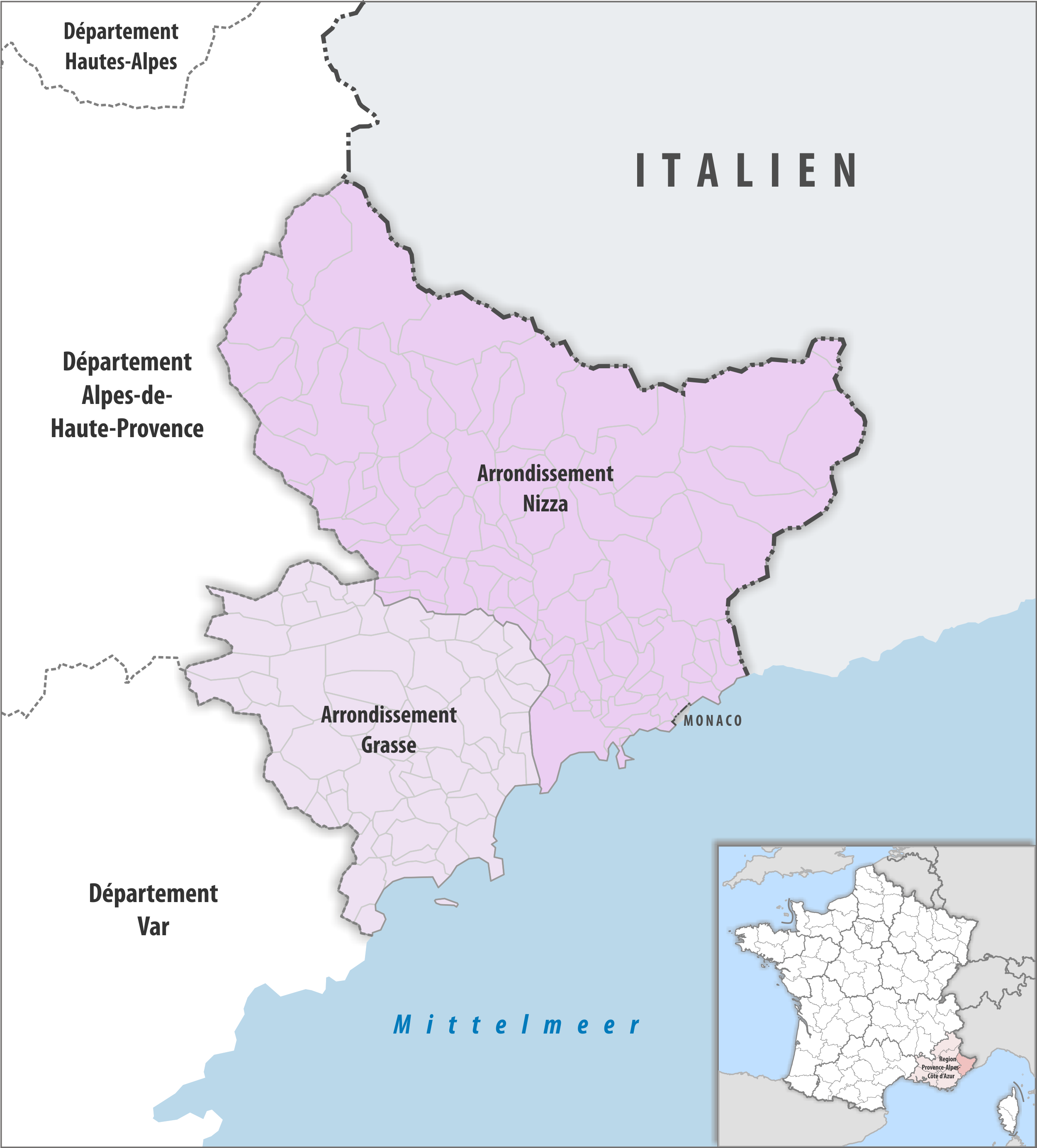
Map of arrondissements of the Alpes-Maritimes department.

The two arrondissements of the Alpes-Maritimes department are:

1. Arrondissement of Grasse, (subprefecture: Grasse) with 62 communes. The population of the arrondissement was 573,247 in 2021.
2. Arrondissement of Nice, (prefecture of the Alpes-Maritimes department: Nice) with 101 communes. The population of the arrondissement was 530,694 in 2021.

== History ==
After French occupation, in 1800 the arrondissements of Nice, Monaco and Puget-Théniers were established. In 1805 the arrondissement of Sanremo was created, and the arrondissement of Monaco was disbanded. The department was returned to the Kingdom of Sardinia. In 1860, after the County of Nice was annexed to France, the department of Alpes-Maritimes was restored, with the arrondissements Nice, Grasse (formerly part of Var) and Puget-Théniers. The arrondissement of Puget-Théniers was disbanded in 1926.
