= Estéron =

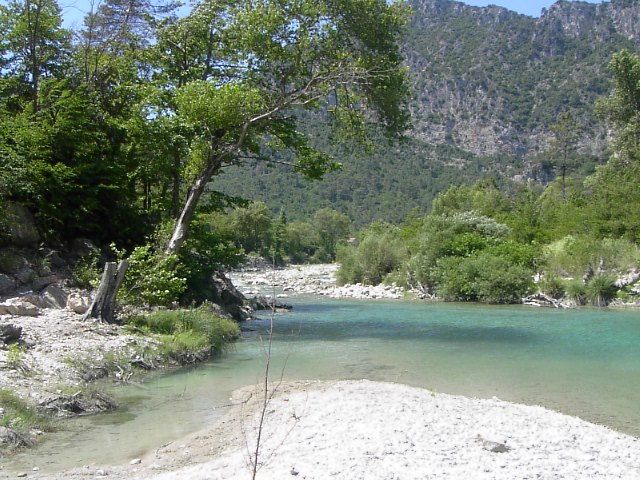

- Location within France Location within Provence-Alpes-Côte d'Azur

Location
- Country: France

Physical characteristics
- Mouth
  - location: Var
  - coordinates: 43°49′8″N 7°11′8″E
- Length: 66 km (41 mi)
- Basin size: 445 km^{2} (172 sq mi)

Basin features
- Progression: Var→ Mediterranean Sea

The Estéron a river that flows through the Alpes-de-Haute-Provence and Alpes-Maritimes departments of southeastern France. It is 66.2 km (41.1 mi) long. Its drainage basin is 445 km^{2} (172 sq mi). Its source is near Soleilhas. It flows generally east, through Roquestéron, and flows into the Var in Saint-Martin-du-Var. The Bouyon and the Rioulan are its tributaries.
