= Alpes-Maritimes =

Department in Provence-Alpes-Côte d'Azur, France

Alpes-Maritimes Aups Maritims (Occitan)
- Department
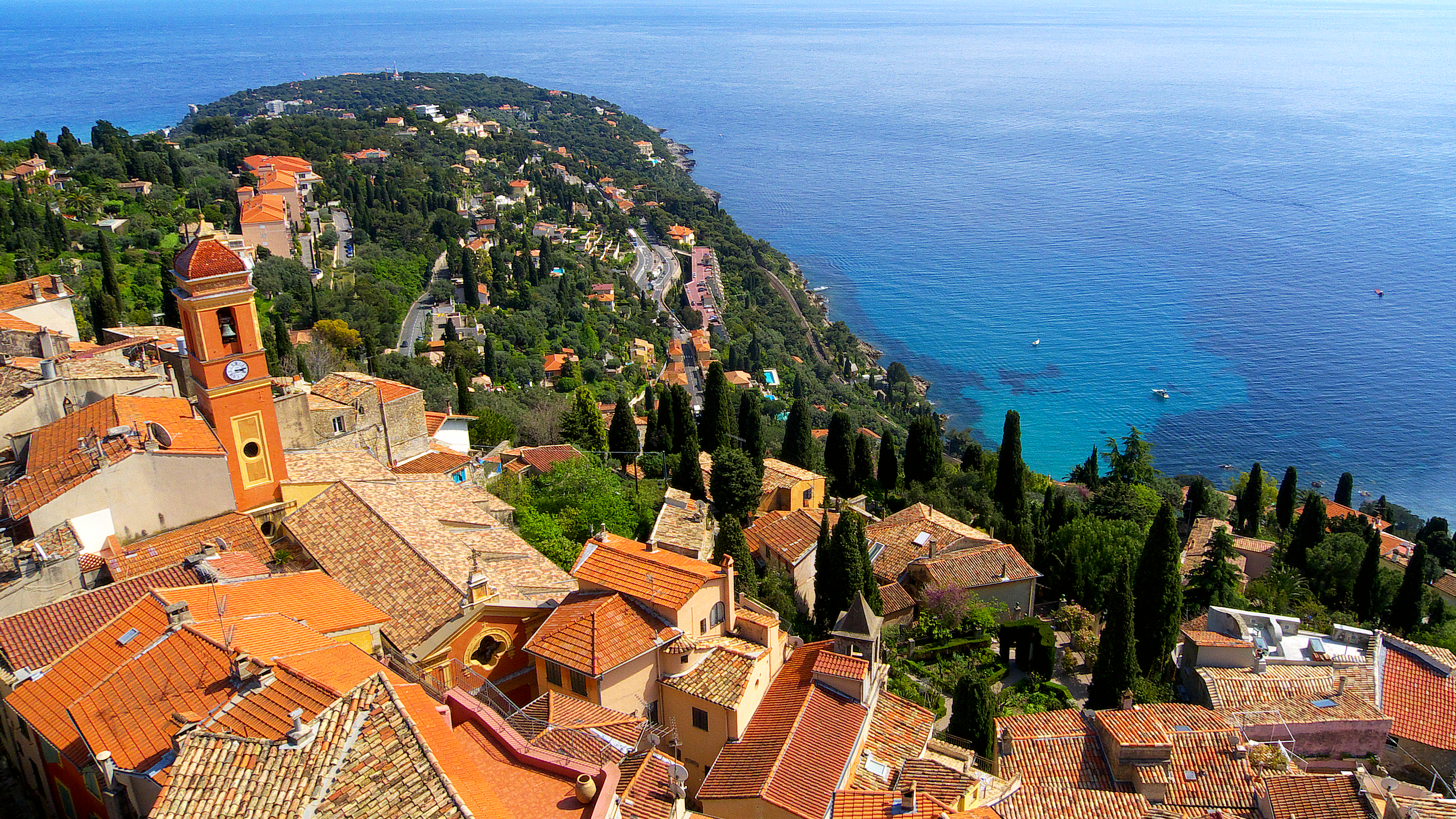
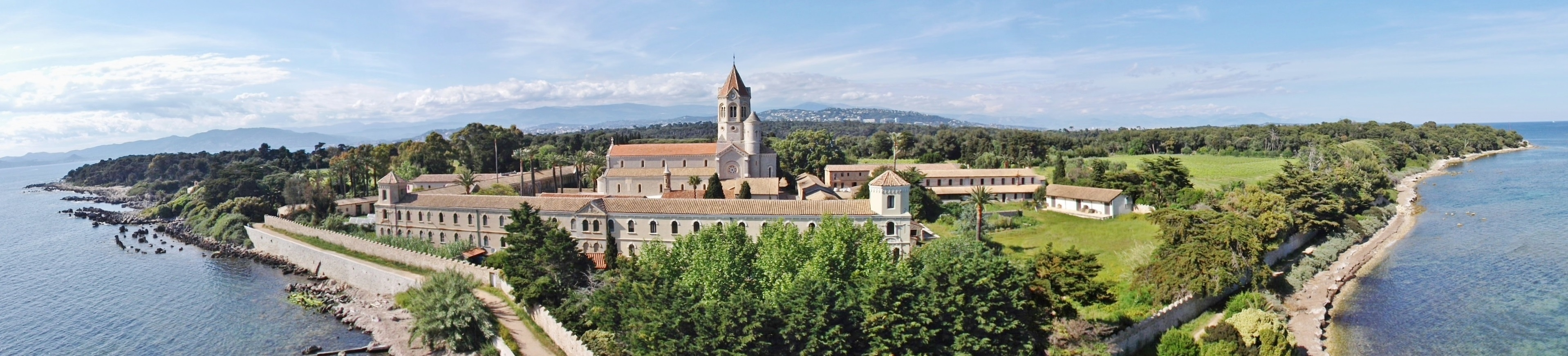
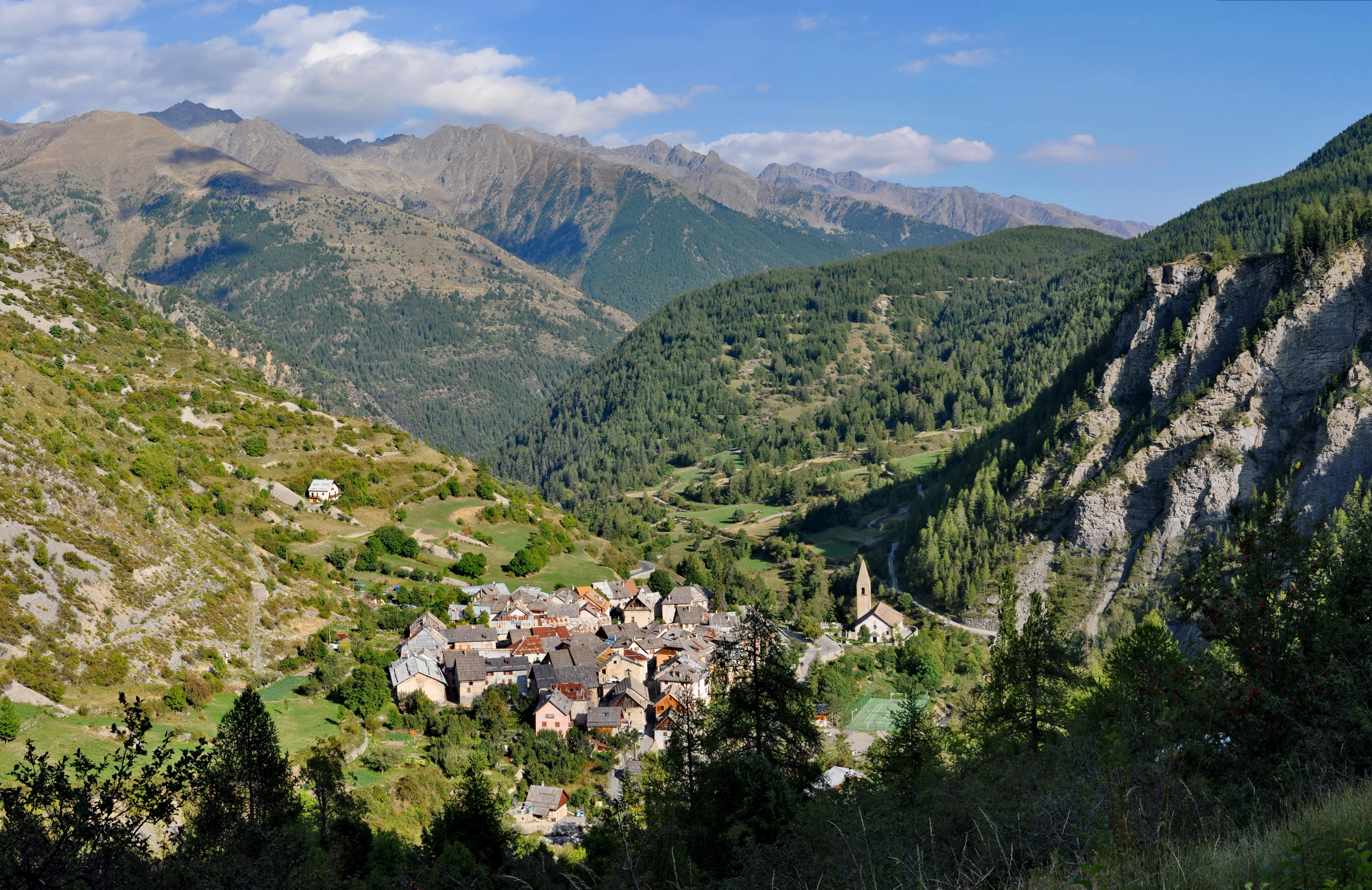
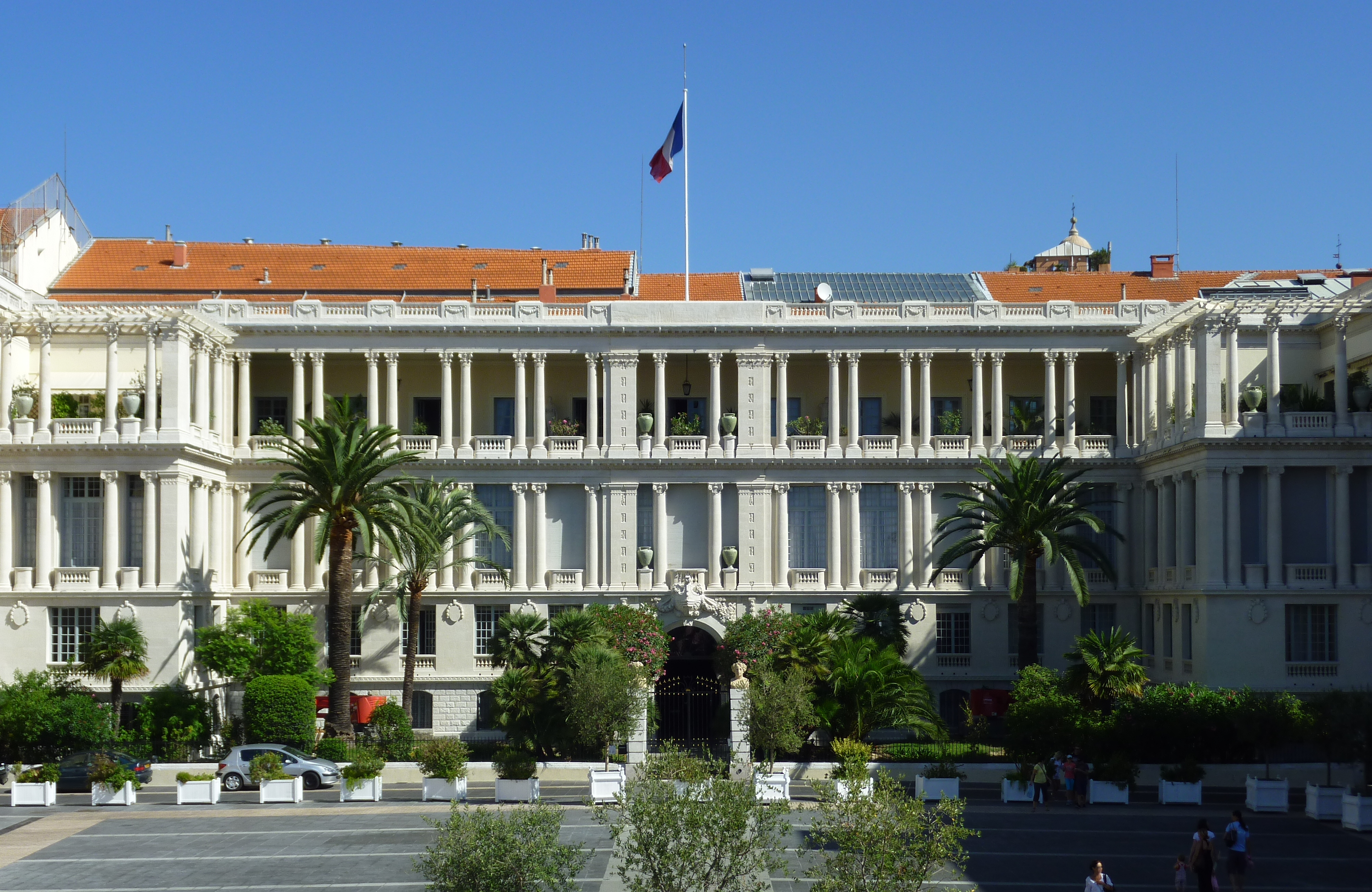
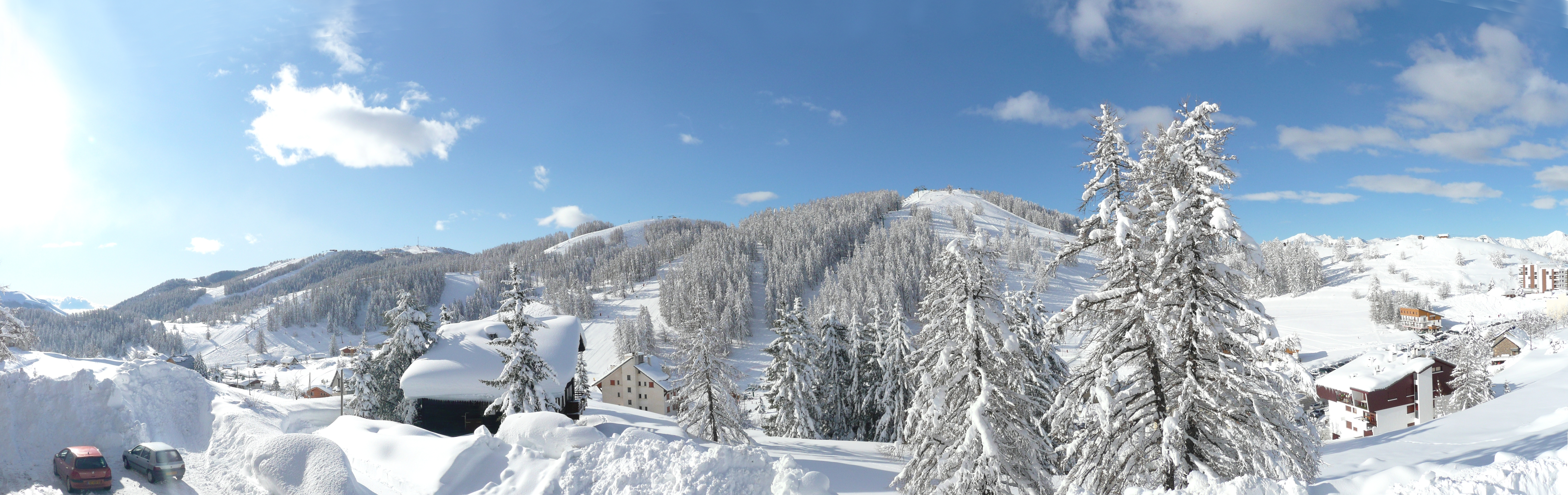
- Clockwise from top: a view on the Mediterranean from Roquebrune-Cap-Martin; Lérins Abbey on Île Saint-Honorat; Saint-Dalmas-le-Selvage; prefecture building in Nice; and Mercantour National Park

- Flag Coat of arms

- Location of Alpes-Maritimes in France
- Coordinates: 43°50′N 7°10′E
- Country: France
- Region: Provence-Alpes-Côte d'Azur
- Prefecture: Nice
- Subprefecture: Grasse

Government
  - President of the Departmental Council: Charles Ange Ginésy (LR)

Area^{1}
  - Total: 4,299 km^{2} (1,660 sq mi)

Population (2023)
  - Total: 1,128,418
  - Rank: 20th
  - Density: 262.5/km^{2} (679.8/sq mi)
- Time zone: UTC+1 (CET)
  - Summer (DST): UTC+2 (CEST)
- Department number: 06
- Arrondissements: 2
- Cantons: 27
- Communes: 163
- ^1 French Land Register data, which exclude estuaries and lakes, ponds and glaciers larger than 1 km^{2}

Logo of the department of Alpes-Maritimes

Alpes-Maritimes (French: [alp(ə)maʁitim]; Occitan: Aups Maritims; Monégasque: Alpes Marìtime; Italian: Alpi Marittime; lit. 'Maritime Alps') is a department of France located in the country's southeast corner, on the Italian border and Mediterranean coast. Part of the Provence-Alpes-Côte d'Azur region, it encompasses the French Riviera alongside neighbouring Var. Alpes-Maritimes had a population of 1,128,418 in 2023. Its prefecture (and largest city) is Nice, with Grasse as the sole subprefecture.

Alpes-Maritimes has become one of the world's most attractive tourist destinations in recent decades, featuring renowned cities and towns such as Nice, Grasse, Cannes, Antibes, Menton, Èze, Roquebrune-Cap-Martin and Sainte-Agnès, as well as numerous alpine ski resorts. It also entirely surrounds the Principality of Monaco. The department's inhabitants are called Maralpins (masculine) or Maralpines (feminine) but are more commonly referred to as "Azuréens"; its arms are those of the City of Nice. In terms of politics, Alpes-Maritimes is one of France's most right-wing departments, as the majority led by The Republicans in the departmental council holds all but two of the 54 seats following the 2021 election.

== Geography ==
=== Overview ===
The Alpes-Maritimes department is surrounded by the departments of Var in the southwest, Alpes-de-Haute-Provence in the northwest; Italy to the north and east; and the Mediterranean Sea to the south. It surrounds the Principality of Monaco on the west, north and east.

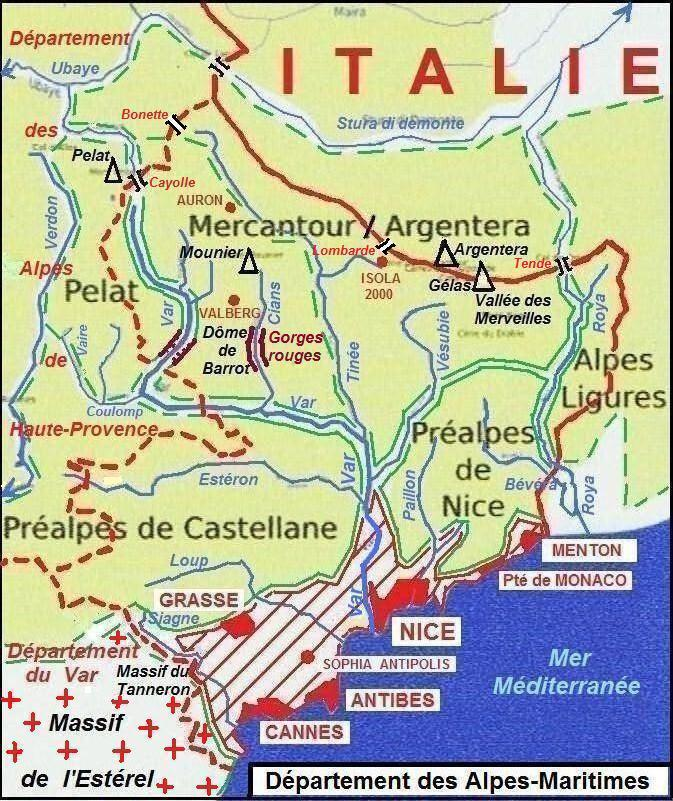
Geography of Alpes-Maritimes

Its topography is very mixed. As its name suggests, most of the department is a constituent part of the overall topographic Alps – including the Maritime Alps – but it also has the distinction of being a coastal district with its Mediterranean coast. The coastal area, urbanized and densely populated (shaded in red on the map), includes all the cities in an almost continuous conurbation from Cannes to Menton, while the larger but sparsely populated mountainous area (light green) is fully rural with the exception of the three large resorts of Valberg (created in 1936), Auron (created in 1937) and Isola 2000 (created in 1971).

==== Summits and passes ====
The highest point of the department is the Cime du Gélas (3,143 metres, 10,312 ft) on the Franco-Italian border which dominates the Vallée des Merveilles further east. The summit of Monte Argentera is higher at 3,297 metres (10,817 ft) above sea level, but it is located in Italy. There is also Mount Mounier (2,817 metres, 9,242 ft), which dominates the south of the vast Dôme de Barrot, formed of a mass more than 900 metres (3,000 ft) thick of red mudstones deeply indented by the gorges of Daluis and Cians. Except in winter, four passes allow passage to the north of the Mercantour-Argentera massif whose imposing 62-kilometre-long (39 mi) barrier is covered in winter snow which is visible from the coast. From the west, the Route des Grandes Alpes enters the Cayolle Pass (2,326 metres, 7,631 ft) first on the way to the Alps and the sources of the Var in the commune of Entraunes. Then the route follows the Col de la Bonette – the highest pass in Europe at 2,715 metres (8,907 ft) – to connect to the valley of the Tinée then the Ubaye. Further east, the Col de la Lombarde (2,350 metres, 7,710 ft) above Isola 2000 allows access to the shrine of Saint-Anne de Vinadio in Italy. Finally, at its eastern end, the Col de Tende (1,871 metres, 6,138 ft) links with Cuneo in Italy.

==== Landscape and forest vegetation ====
The only region of the Alps close to Nice has an afforestation rate of 60.9%, slightly higher than the average of the department and well above the average of 39.4% for the Provence-Alpes-Côte d'Azur region.

The rivers in alphabetical order are:

- Aigue Blanche
- Barlatte
- Bassera
- Bendola
- Bévéra
- Borrigo
- Bourdous
- Bouyon
- Brague
- Braisse
- Braus
- Cagne
- Caramagne
- Carei
- Castérine
- Chalvagne
- Cians
- Cianavelle
- Clans
- Coulomb
- Estéron
- Faye
- Fontanalba
- Gorbio
- Gordolasque
- Guercha
- Lévensa or Levenza
- Loup
- Lubiane
- Maglia
- Magnan
- Malvan
- Mayola
- Minière
- Nieya
- Oglione
- Paillon (les Paillons)
- Raton
- Réfréi
- Riou
- Rioulan
- Roudoule
- Roya
- Siagne
- Tinée
- Tuébi
- Valmasque
- Var
- Vésubie
- Vionène

=== Climate ===
It is the climate that made the Côte d'Azur famous. The current department of Alpes-Maritimes, however, does not have only one climate, the complex terrain and high mountains divide the department between those who are well exposed (the south-facing side) and those which are less (the north-facing side) and even with the mild Mediterranean climate there can be violent storms and prolonged droughts.

The coastal area has a Mediterranean climate (rainfall in autumn November and spring February especially, summer drought, mild winter and dry summer). The interior, especially in the north, has a mountain climate (winter quite bright, summer storms). Around Cannes is a particularly warm micro-climate due to the high hills warming the air which descends on the city.

One of the attractions of the department is its level of sunshine: over 300 days per year. Despite this the department is also the most stormy of France with an average of 70 to 90 thunderstorm days per year, arising from the differences in temperature due to a warm sea in autumn.

As soon as one moves away from the coast, towards the west of the department, the interior plains (in particular near Grasse) the climate is a little less temperate but just as sunny. In summer, the temperature very easily exceeds 30 °C (86 °F), while the average is only 27 °C (81 °F) along the Nice coast during July and August. Occasional frost is possible in the interior during winter, unlike in Nice and rest of the coast, where frost is very rare.

In the east of the department, unlike the west, there are no plains. In the Menton region, the altitude increases very rapidly inland, so the sea tempers the atmosphere much more: the maximum in summer is on average 25 °C (77 °F) and the winters are milder than in the interior and frost is very rare.

Snow is also rare along the coast, however, it happens that rare snowfall surprises the Côte d'Azur residents (on average every 5–7 years), as was the case in the winter of 2004–2005 when the city of Nice woke up with a few centimetres of snow, often creating traffic problems. More recently, in February 2010, more than 10 centimetres (3.9 in) of snow was measured in Cannes and nearly 30 centimetres (12 in) in the Grasse region.

In the north of the department the climate in the Alps is mountainous, and there is decent snow cover from end of November until late April.

Climate data for Nice
Month	Jan	Feb	Mar	Apr	May	Jun	Jul	Aug	Sep	Oct	Nov	Dec	Year
Mean daily maximum °C (°F)	13.1 (55.6)	13.4 (56.1)	15.2 (59.4)	17.0 (62.6)	20.7 (69.3)	24.3 (75.7)	27.3 (81.1)	27.7 (81.9)	24.6 (76.3)	21.0 (69.8)	16.6 (61.9)	13.8 (56.8)	19.6 (67.3)
Daily mean °C (°F)	9.2 (48.6)	9.7 (49.5)	11.6 (52.9)	13.6 (56.5)	17.4 (63.3)	20.9 (69.6)	23.8 (74.8)	24.2 (75.6)	21.0 (69.8)	17.4 (63.3)	12.9 (55.2)	10.1 (50.2)	16.0 (60.8)
Mean daily minimum °C (°F)	5.3 (41.5)	5.9 (42.6)	7.9 (46.2)	10.2 (50.4)	14.1 (57.4)	17.5 (63.5)	20.3 (68.5)	20.5 (68.9)	17.3 (63.1)	13.7 (56.7)	9.2 (48.6)	6.3 (43.3)	12.4 (54.3)
Average precipitation mm (inches)	69.0 (2.72)	44.7 (1.76)	38.7 (1.52)	69.3 (2.73)	44.6 (1.76)	34.3 (1.35)	12.1 (0.48)	17.8 (0.70)	73.1 (2.88)	132.8 (5.23)	103.9 (4.09)	92.7 (3.65)	733.0 (28.86)
Average precipitation days (≥ 1 mm)	5.8	4.7	4.6	7.1	5.2	3.8	1.8	2.4	4.9	7.2	7.2	6.4	61.1
Mean monthly sunshine hours	158	171	217	224	267	306	348	316	242	187	149	139	2,724
Source: Meteorological data for Nice – 2 m altitude, from 1981 to 2010 January 2015 (in French)

Comparison of local Meteorological data with other cities in France
Town	Sunshine (hours/yr)	Rain (mm/yr)	Snow (days/yr)	Storm (days/yr)	Fog (days/yr)
National average	1,973	770	14	22	40
Nice	2,724	733	1	29	1
Paris	1,661	637	12	18	10
Strasbourg	1,693	665	29	29	56
Brest	1,605	1,211	7	12	75

=== Subdivisions ===
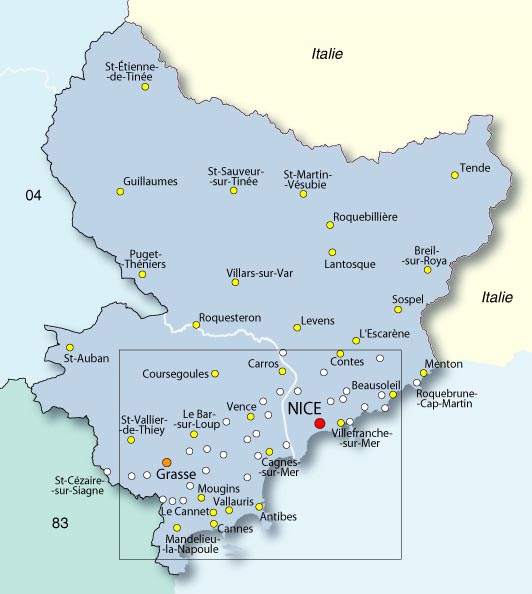
Department map showing its division into the two arrondissements and the location of some of its principal cities and towns

Alpes-Maritimes is divided into two arrondissements: Grasse and Nice, twenty-seven cantons and 163 communes.

As of March 2026, there were seven intercommunalities:

- One metropolis:
  - Métropole Nice Côte d'Azur.
- Four agglomeration communities:
  - Communauté d'agglomération de Sophia Antipolis
  - Communauté d'agglomération Cannes Pays de Lérins
  - Communauté d'agglomération du Pays de Grasse
  - Communauté d'agglomération de la Riviera Française
- Two communautés de communes:
  - Communauté de communes du Pays des Paillons
  - Communauté de communes Alpes d'Azur

=== Principal communes ===
The most populous commune is the prefecture Nice. As of 2023, there are 10 communes with more than 20,000 inhabitants:

Commune	Population (2023)
Nice	357,737
Antibes	77,637
Cannes	74,350
Cagnes-sur-Mer	53,354
Grasse	50,970
Le Cannet	41,938
Saint-Laurent-du-Var	32,172
Menton	30,604
Vallauris	29,259
Mandelieu-la-Napoule	21,640

== History ==
The Roman military district of Alpes Maritimae was created by Augustus in 14 BC. It became a full Roman province in the middle of the 1st century AD, with its capital first at Cemenelum (today Cimiez, a suburb north of Nice) and subsequently at Embrun. At its greatest extent in AD 297, the province reached north to Digne and Briançon.

Conquered by the French First Republic during the French Revolutionary Wars, a department of Alpes-Maritimes was first set up in 1793 with different boundaries from those of the modern department. In 1793, Alpes-Maritimes included Monaco (Port Hercules), but not Grasse, which was then part of the department of Var as a historical part of France. In 1805, San Remo (San Rème) was included after the disbandment of the Ligurian Republic. In 1812, the department had three arrondissements with the following cantons:

- Nice, cantons: Nice (2 cantons), Aspremont, La Brigue, Menton, Monaco, Roquebillière, Saint-Sauveur-sur-Tinée, Saorge, L'Escarène, Sospel, Utelle and Villefranche-sur-Mer.
- Sanremo, cantons: Sanremo, Bordighera, Dolceacqua, Pigna, Taggia, Triora and Ventimiglia.
- Puget-Théniers, cantons: Puget-Théniers, Beuil, Gilette, Guillaumes, Roquestéron, Saint-Étienne-de-Tinée and Villars-sur-Var.

The population of the department in 1812 was 131,266, and its area was 3,226.74 square kilometres (1,245.85 sq mi), covering both present-day Arrondissement of Nice, Principality of Monaco and Province of Imperia.

In 1814, at the close of the Napoleonic Wars, the territory was restored to the Crown of Savoy by the Congress of Vienna.

In 1860 Camillo Benso, Count of Cavour, one of the architects of Italian unity with the Kingdom of Piedmont-Sardinia, negotiated support for Napoleon III in exchange for Savoy and the County of Nice as set forth in the Treaty of Turin. The annexation was confirmed on 15 and 16 April 1860 by 30,712 male electors enrolled in the 89 communes of the County of Nice who, for the first time, had universal male suffrage by plebiscite. The "Yes" vote for reunification with France was 83.8% of registered voters and 99.2% of votes.

The new department of Alpes-Maritimes consisted of the former County of Nice, divided into an Arrondissement of Nice and an Arrondissement of Puget-Théniers (both arrondissements existed in the former Department (1793–1814)), and a portion of the Var department, which formed the Arrondissement of Grasse. However, the County of Nice did not include Tende and La Brigue, which were still part of Piedmont-Sardinia.

For economic reasons, the Arrondissement of Puget-Théniers was merged into the Arrondissement of Nice in 1926. Since that time, the department has had two arrondissements.

In 1947, in accordance with the Treaty of Paris and as a referendum result favourable to their attachment to France, the communes of Tende and La Brigue (also parts of communes in the high valleys of Vésubie and Tinée: part the commune of Isola) which had not been ceded to France in 1860, were attached to the department.

=== Heraldry ===
Arms of Alpes-Maritimes and Nice	Blazon: Argent, an eagle crowned of gules displayed with wings inverted, on a mountain of three hillocks sable issuant from the pointed waves of a sea azure waved in argent.

== Administration ==
=== Politics ===
Constituencies of Alpes-Maritimes for the National Assembly of France. Blue: The Republicans. Yellow: La République En Marche! (2017).

Since the end of World War II, Alpes-Maritimes has generally voted to the right. It has nine constituencies for the National Assembly. Following the 2017 legislative election, six constituencies are represented by members of The Republicans (LR) right-wing party and three by members of the La République En Marche! (REM) centrist party. Of the five members of the Senate who represent the department in the upper house of Parliament, four are right-wing (LR) and one is left-wing (Socialist Party, PS). Of the 54 departmental councillors, 52 are aligned with the right-wing coalition and two are in the left-wing opposition.

In the 2022 French presidential election, Marine Le Pen of the National Rally won a plurality in Alpes-Maritimes in the first round; incumbent Emmanuel Macron of La République En Marche! won a majority in the second round.

In the 1980s and 1990s, Alpes-Maritimes experienced corruption problems with its politicians, which led to several criminal convictions, including those of Nice Mayor Jacques Médecin and Cannes Mayor Michel Mouillot, as well as that of Antibes Mayor Pierre Merli, criminally indicted in 1995 for a real estate scam and convicted four years later.

==== Departmental Council of Alpes-Maritimes ====
The President of the Departmental Council has been Charles-Ange Ginésy since 2017, who took office upon succeeding Éric Ciotti. Ciotti remained a councillor and became majority leader. Ginésy, who has been a councillor for the canton of Vence since 2015, has held a seat in the council since 2003. He also was Mayor of Péone (2001–2017) and the MP for Alpes-Maritimes's 2nd constituency (2005–2007; 2007–2008; 2009–2010; 2012–2017). Both are members of The Republicans (LR).

The coalition majority in the departmental council is one of the largest majorities in any such institution in France. Out of the 54 seats, only two are held by left-wing councillors, both elected in the canton of Grasse-2. In neighbouring Var, the right-wing coalition also holds all but two seats in the departmental council, although it is made up of fewer seats and the two councillors in opposition are members of the far-right National Rally (RN). Following the 2021 departmental election, the seats were allocated as follows in Alpes-Maritimes:

Party		Seats
•	The Republicans	45
•	Miscellaneous right	5
•	Union of Democrats and Independents	1
•	La République En Marche!	1
	Europe Ecology – The Greens	1
	Socialist Party	1

==== Representation in Parliament ====
===== Members of the National Assembly =====
Alpes-Maritimes elected the following MPs to the National Assembly in the 2024 legislative election:

Constituency	Member	Affiliation
Alpes-Maritimes's 1st constituency	Éric Ciotti	UDR
Alpes-Maritimes's 2nd constituency	Lionel Tivoli	National Rally
Alpes-Maritimes's 3rd constituency	Bernard Chaix	UDR
Alpes-Maritimes's 4th constituency	Alexandra Masson	National Rally
Alpes-Maritimes's 5th constituency	Christelle d'Intorni	UDR
Alpes-Maritimes's 6th constituency	Bryan Masson	National Rally
Alpes-Maritimes's 7th constituency	Éric Pauget	The Republicans
Alpes-Maritimes's 8th constituency	Alexandra Martin	The Republicans
Alpes-Maritimes's 9th constituency	Michèle Tabarot	The Republicans

===== Senators =====
As of 2025, the department's five senators are Alexandra Borchio-Fontimp (LR, since 2020), Jean-Marc Delia (LR, since 2025), Patricia Demas (LR, since 2020), Dominique Estrosi Sassone (LR, since 2014) and Henri Leroy (LR, since 2017).

=== Budget ===
In 2011, the draft departmental budget amounted to €1.3 billion of which 498 million (38.3%) was devoted to social action and 346 million to operations (26.6%). Capital expenditures was just over 250 million euros (19.2%).

In 2010, the department was the third most indebted in France with €942 million of debt or 68.4% of the annual budget. This debt amounted to 2,460 euros per fiscal tax unit (household) and 859 euros per person. The trend of change in debt over the last decade has been a sharp increase: + 440% between 2001 and 2009 and 26% between 2009 and 2010. There was only €43 million in debt in 2003.

=== Projects ===
The Departmental Council of Alpes-Maritimes is currently sponsoring several large projects:

- construction of 10 residential facilities for the elderly
- building dykes in the Var plain
- creation of a STIC (science and information technology and communication) campus at Sophia Antipolis
- construction of 337 units of social housing
- establishment of facilities for the disabled
- road construction
- construction of schools and gyms (10)
- construction of a centre of sustainable development
- construction of the LGV Provence-Alpes-Côte d'Azur
- creation of the Eco Valley in the Plaine of the Var which will run from the Arenas Quarter (which will be converted) to the village of Baus-Roux

The Alpes-Maritimes Departmental Council has charged 1 euro per vehicle journey in the department, regardless of distance, since 1 January 2008.

== Demographics ==
Historical population

Year	Pop.	±% p.a.
1806	131,266	—
1821	161,886	+1.41%
1851	192,062	+0.57%
1861	194,578	+0.13%
1872	199,037	+0.21%
1881	226,621	+1.45%
1891	258,571	+1.33%
1901	293,213	+1.27%
1911	356,338	+1.97%
1921	357,759	+0.04%
1931	493,376	+3.27%
1936	513,714	+0.81%

Year	Pop.	±% p.a.
1946	453,073	−1.25%
1954	515,484	+1.63%
1962	618,265	+2.30%
1968	722,070	+2.62%
1975	816,681	+1.77%
1982	881,198	+1.09%
1990	971,829	+1.23%
1999	1,011,326	+0.44%
2007	1,082,465	+0.85%
2012	1,082,014	−0.01%
2017	1,083,310	+0.02%
2023	1,128,418	+0.68%

When Nice became part of France in 1860, it was still a small town; the department had fewer than 200,000 inhabitants. However, the population grew quickly from 300,000 at the beginning of the 20th century to over a million. The population is aging because of the number of retirees who move to the coast.

The population is now concentrated in the urban region that includes Antibes, Cannes, Grasse, Nice, and Menton, and which constitutes 90% of the total population.

The department had 1,128,418 inhabitants in 2023, making it the 20th most populated department in France. There are 163 communes including 107 under 2000 inhabitants (representing a total of 60,376 inhabitants), 36 from 2000 to 9999 inhabitants (total 159,291 inhabitants), 15 between 10,000 and 49,999 inhabitants (total 294,703 inhabitants), 4 between 50,000 and 199,999 inhabitants (Antibes, Cannes, Cagnes-sur-Mer and Grasse, total 256,311 inhabitants), and one with over 200,000 inhabitants (Nice, with 357,737 inhabitants). The population density was 263 inhabitants per square kilometre in 2023.

According to INSEE 39.5% of children born in 2011 in the department of Alpes-Maritimes have at least one parent born abroad (regardless of nationality), 15.4% have a father born in North Africa.

The area is also known for its extremely large population of people of Italian descent. About 40% of the population of the Alpes-Maritimes claim their ancestry as being solely Italian, and as many as 80% of the population can trace some degree of ancestry back to Italy before it was annexed by France in the 1860s.

== Economy ==
The economy of the Alpes-Maritimes is characterized by the importance of the tertiary sector. The department has, in addition to tourism and traditional services, a relatively high level of corporate research and higher level of services. Agriculture is of little importance and industry plays a relatively small role although it has diversified into activities with high technological value. The construction and public works sector is quite important. The economy is very sensitive to changes in the national and international situation. The rate of unemployment is 9.1%.

According to the INSEE, in 2005 the GDP per capita of the Alpes-Maritimes was 27,723 euros which ranked it as the thirteenth highest department in France. GDP was 29.6 billion euros. According to Eurostat, GDP per capita at market prices in 2008, the department had a GDP per capita of 30,700 euros, which is also ranked it thirteenth in France.

=== Distribution of employment ===
Distribution of Employment
	Services Sector	Industry	Construction & Public Works	Agriculture
Alpes-Maritimes	76.2%	12.5%	9.2%	2.1%
National Average	71.5%	18.3%	6.1%	4.1%

Tourism is an essential industry for the entire coastal region (Côte d'Azur) and is highly developed. On the coast, thanks to the mild climate, towns are resort destinations all year round. In the mountains, there are winter sports stations that have received abundant snow in recent years, particularly Isola 2000.

There are also well-developed industries such as the perfume industry in Grasse, new technologies from Sophia-Antipolis, and the aerospace industry in Cannes-Mandelieu, where there is the first European satellite builders and the first industrial plant dedicated to spacecraft manufacturing.

== Tourism ==
=== Seaside ===
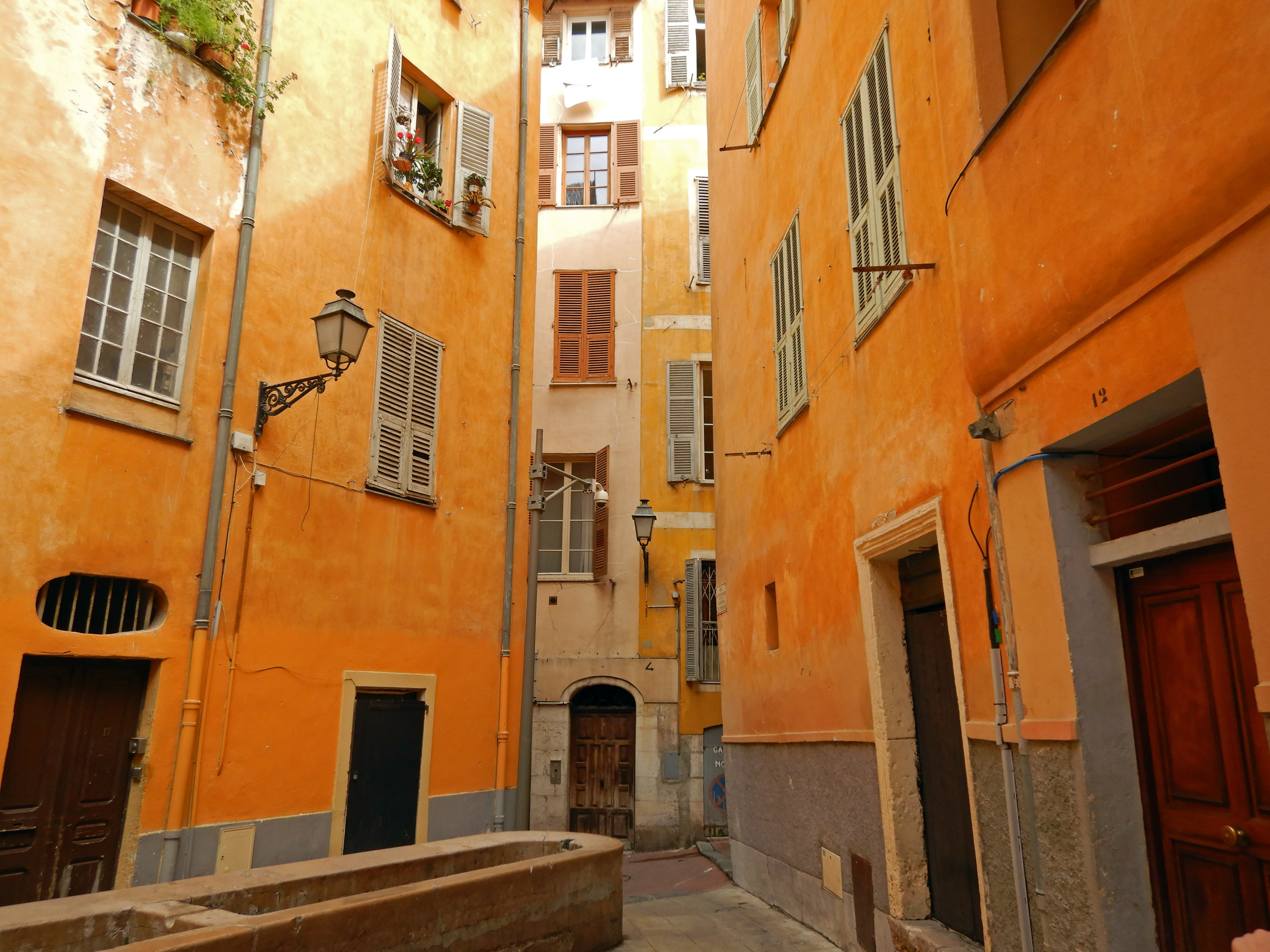
The French Riviera, centred on Nice, attracts millions of international tourists every year.

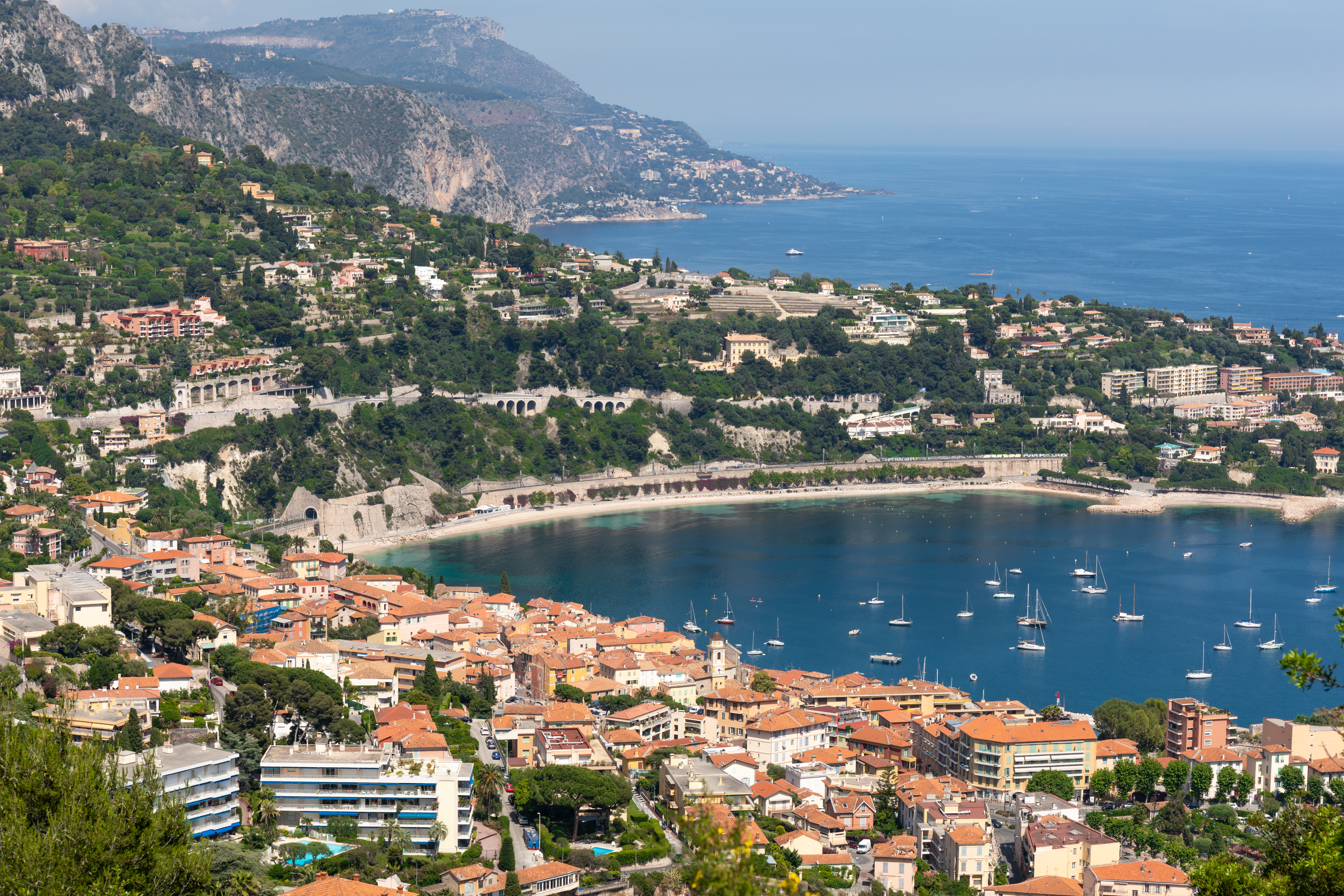
Villefranche-sur-Mer between Nice and Monaco

The presence of the Mediterranean Sea and the French Alps under a mild sky has favoured one dominant activity: tourism, which accounts for 64,000 jobs directly in the Alpes-Maritimes. For only the city of Nice the tourism turnover represents a 12 to 13% share of the whole tourism market in France. The capital of the Côte d'Azur is the fifth most populous city in France. The city of Nice also has the second largest airport in France (Nice Côte d'Azur Airport), after Paris and its three airports at Roissy, Orly and Le Bourget. There are nearly 13.5 million passengers per year passing through Nice Airport.

The seaside where the majority of the population resides is one of the most popular parts of the world with many attractions:

- Seaside resorts (Théoule-sur-Mer, Mandelieu-la-Napoule, Cannes, Golfe-Juan, Juan-les-Pins, Antibes, Cagnes-sur-Mer, Nice, Villefranche-sur-Mer, Beaulieu-sur-Mer, Èze-sur-Mer, Cap d'Ail, Roquebrune-Cap-Martin and Menton)
- Convention cities that spread their business throughout the year are Cannes, with its Palais des Festivals, and Nice, with its Acropolis.

The area inland from the busy French Riviera is a base for many outdoor sports: cycling, mountain biking, skiing, walking, rock climbing, canyoning, canoeing, rafting, fishing, horse riding, Adventure parks, caving and the area has the first ever underground via ferrata. The area has internationally renowned paragliding and hang gliding flying sites at Col-de-Bleyne, Gourdon, Gréolières and Lachens.

=== Mountainside ===
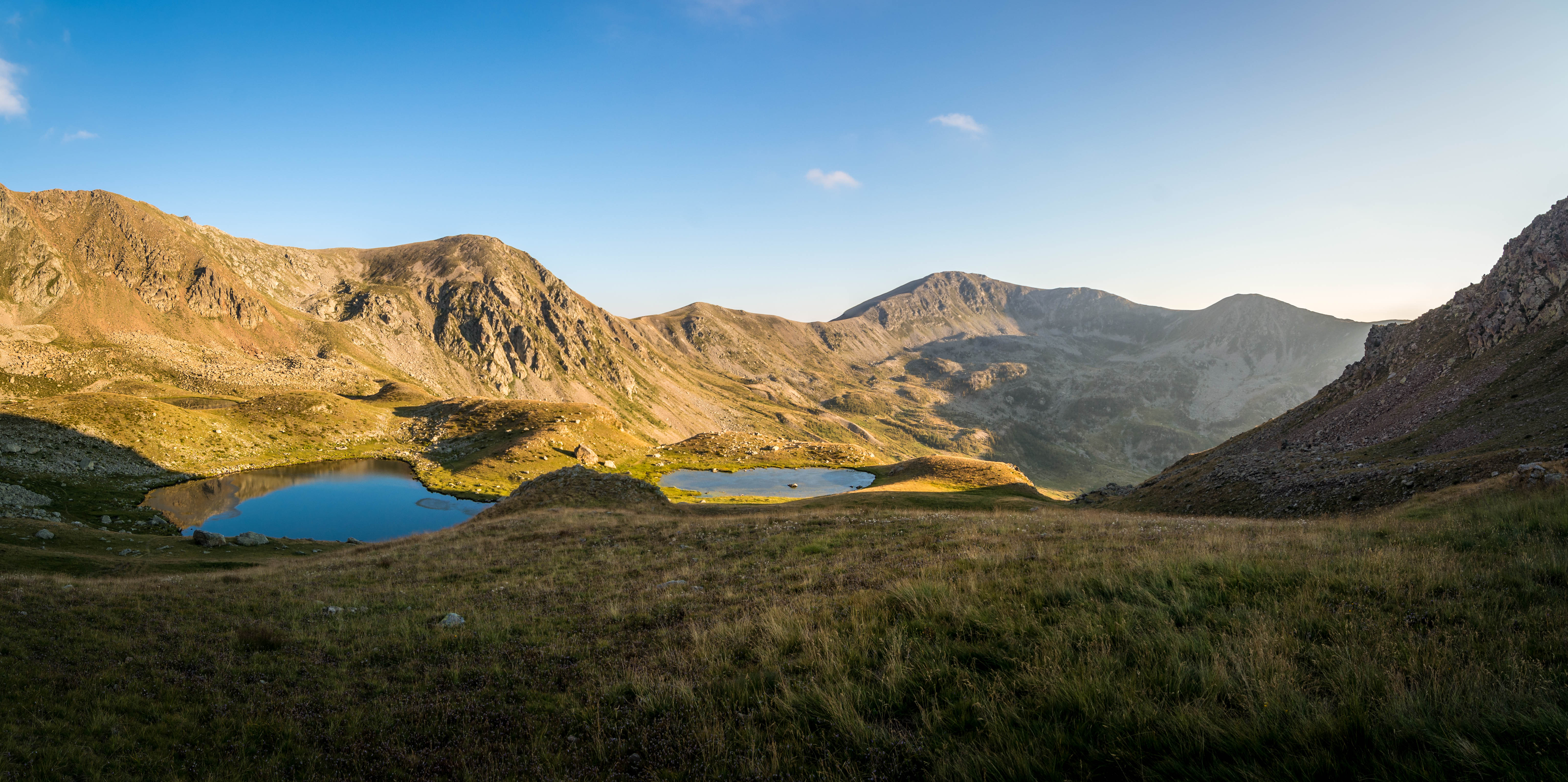
Mercantour National Park in the commune of Saint-Martin-Vésubie, which primarily covers a small town in the Alps and tourist destination

In the mountains, skiing and hiking bring life to Saint-Étienne-de-Tinée (Auron), Beuil, Péone (Valberg), Saint-Martin-Vésubie, Isola, Gréolières, Peïra-Cava, Col de Turini, and Turini-Camp d'argent in the Authion mountains.

=== Second homes ===
As of 2020, 25.3% of available housing in the department were second homes.

== Education ==
=== Primary and secondary education ===
The department has 222 nursery schools, 357 primary schools and one special school. It also hosts 72 colleges, 14 vocational schools and 22 high schools, to which must be added 65 private schools.

=== Higher education ===
The University of Nice Sophia Antipolis, in Nice and neighbouring areas, was founded in 1965. In 2019 it was merged into the new Université Côte d'Azur.

Higher education is relatively underdeveloped in the department. The urban area of Nice has 35,000 students, while Rennes and Bordeaux each have 60,000.

A campus of the Paris Institute of Political Studies (Sciences Po) was established in Menton in October 2005. The Menton campus is dedicated to the relationship between the northern and southern shores of the Mediterranean and the relationship of Europe with the Middle East.

Several engineering schools are also located in Sophia Antipolis:

- Eurecom (School of Engineering and Research Center in communication systems)
- Mines ParisTech
- Polytech Nice Sophia

In addition, two major business schools are located in the region:

- EDHEC in Nice
- Skema Business School in Sophia Antipolis

There are the French Institute for Research in Computer Science and Automation (INRIA) and the French National Centre for Scientific Research (CNRS) in Sophia Antipolis.

== See also ==
- Arrondissements of the Alpes-Maritimes department
- Cantons of the Alpes-Maritimes department
- Communes of the Alpes-Maritimes department

== Bibliography ==
- The Heritage of the Communes of Alpes-Maritimes in two volumes, Flohic Éditions, collective work, volume I, Cantons of Antibes to Levens, January 2000, Paris, 504 pages, ISBN 2-84234-071-X, Jean-Luc Flohic (in French).
- The Heritage of the Communes of Alpes-Maritimes in two volumes, Flohic Éditions, collective work, volume II, Cantons of Menton to Villefranche-sur-Mer, January 2000, Paris, 574 pages, ISBN 2-84234-071-X, Jean-Luc Flohic, p. 505 to 1079 (in French).
- Rural Architecture of Alpes-Maritimes, Édisud, Philippe de Beauchamp, 1992, Aix-en-Provence, 140 pages, ISBN 2-85744-612-8, Photographer Loîc-Jahan (in French).
- Religious Art in Alpes-Maritimes, Édisud, Philippe de Beauchamp, 4th Quarter 1993, Aix-en-Provence, 144 pages, ISBN 2-85744-485-0, Photographer Loîc-Jahan (in French).
