= Péone =

Commune in Provence-Alpes-Côte d'Azur, France

- Commune
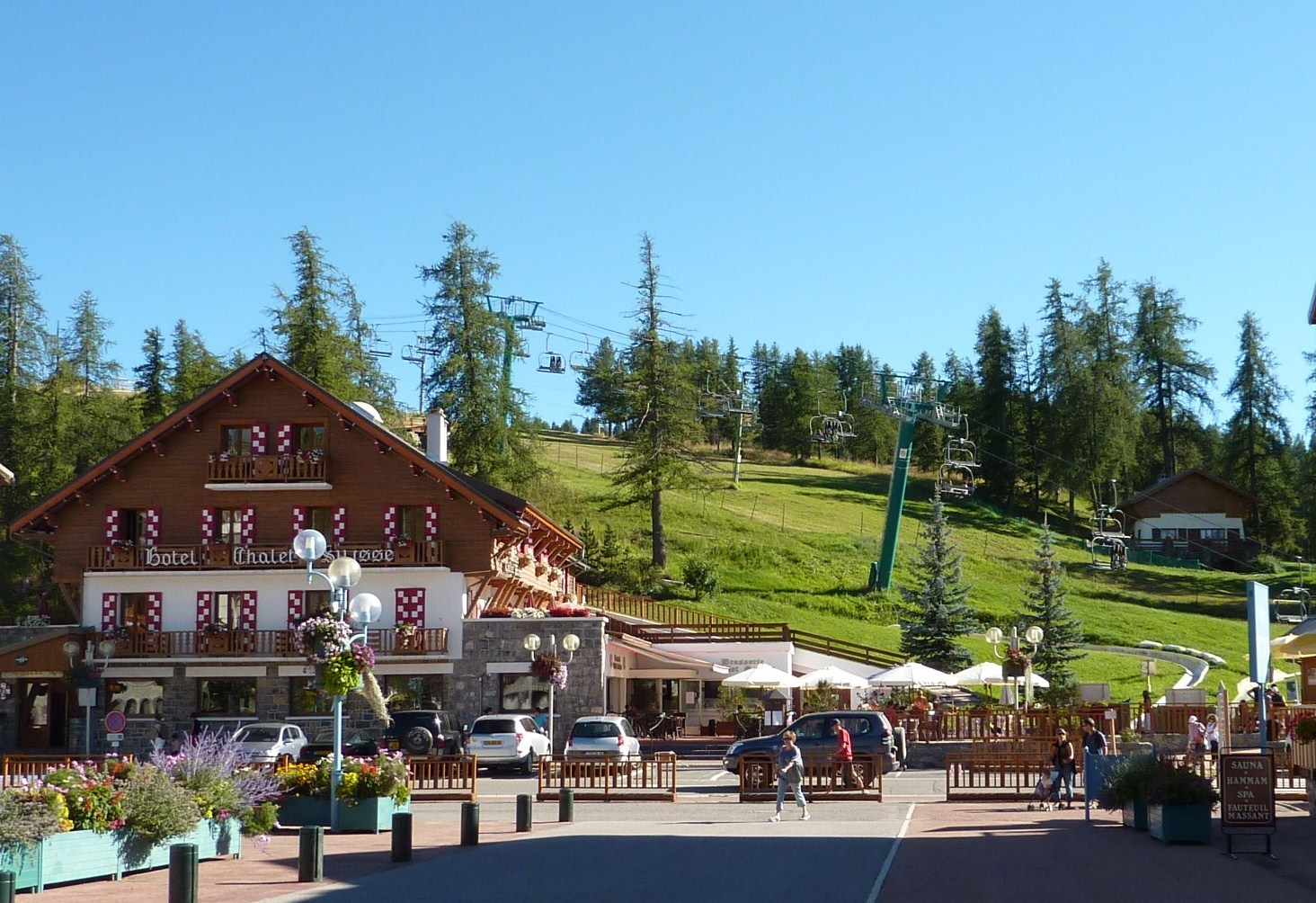
- Valberg ski resort

- Coat of arms
- Location of Péone
- Location within France Location within Provence-Alpes-Côte d'Azur
- Coordinates: 44°07′07″N 6°54′33″E
- Country: France
- Region: Provence-Alpes-Côte d'Azur
- Department: Alpes-Maritimes
- Arrondissement: Nice
- Canton: Vence
- Intercommunality: Alpes d'Azur

Government
  - Mayor (2026–32): Marie-Amélie Ginesy
- Area^{1}: 48.59 km^{2} (18.76 sq mi)
- Elevation: 1,176 m (3,858 ft)
- Highest elevation: 2,640 m (8,660 ft)
- Lowest elevation: 947 m (3,107 ft)
- Population (2023): 1,094
  - Density: 22.51/km^{2} (58.31/sq mi)
- Time zone: UTC+01:00 (CET)
  - Summer (DST): UTC+02:00 (CEST)
- INSEE/Postal code: 06094 /06470
- ^{1} French Land Register data, which excludes lakes, ponds, glaciers > 1 km^{2} (0.386 sq mi or 247 acres) and river estuaries.

Péone (French pronunciation: [pe.ɔn]；Occitan: Pèunas; Italian: Peona) is a commune in the Alpes-Maritimes department in southeastern France.

The Valberg ski resort is, in part, located in this town. Also in Péone is the 11th century historically-listed, Church of Saint-Arige-et-Saint-Vincent-de-Saragosse de Péone.

== Population ==
Historical population
| Year | Pop. | ±% p.a. |
|---|---|---|
| 1968 | 515 | — |
| 1975 | 521 | +0.17% |
| 1982 | 535 | +0.38% |
| 1990 | 528 | −0.16% |
| 1999 | 682 | +2.88% |
| 2007 | 803 | +2.06% |
| 2012 | 984 | +4.15% |
| 2017 | 787 | −4.37% |
| 2023 | 1,094 | +5.64% |
Source: INSEE

== Climate ==
On average, Péone experiences 114.8 days per year with a minimum temperature below 0 °C (32.0 °F), 4.3 days per year with a minimum temperature below −10 °C (14.0 °F), 20.3 days per year with a maximum temperature below 0 °C (32.0 °F), and 0.1 days per year with a maximum temperature above 30 °C (86.0 °F). The record high temperature was 31.0 °C (87.8 °F) on 28 June 2019 and 22 August 2023, while the record low temperature was −15.5 °C (4.1 °F) on 28 February 2018.

Climate data for Péone (1991–2020 normals, extremes 2002–present)
| Month | Jan | Feb | Mar | Apr | May | Jun | Jul | Aug | Sep | Oct | Nov | Dec | Year |
|---|---|---|---|---|---|---|---|---|---|---|---|---|---|
| Record high °C (°F) | 18.9 (66.0) | 20.8 (69.4) | 18.9 (66.0) | 21.7 (71.1) | 26.0 (78.8) | 31.0 (87.8) | 30.5 (86.9) | 31.0 (87.8) | 26.7 (80.1) | 24.5 (76.1) | 21.1 (70.0) | 16.5 (61.7) | 31.0 (87.8) |
| Mean daily maximum °C (°F) | 4.2 (39.6) | 4.0 (39.2) | 6.8 (44.2) | 10.2 (50.4) | 14.1 (57.4) | 18.7 (65.7) | 21.8 (71.2) | 21.9 (71.4) | 17.2 (63.0) | 12.8 (55.0) | 7.5 (45.5) | 4.9 (40.8) | 12.0 (53.6) |
| Daily mean °C (°F) | 0.6 (33.1) | 0.1 (32.2) | 2.8 (37.0) | 6.0 (42.8) | 9.6 (49.3) | 14.2 (57.6) | 16.9 (62.4) | 16.9 (62.4) | 12.8 (55.0) | 9.0 (48.2) | 4.2 (39.6) | 1.6 (34.9) | 7.9 (46.2) |
| Mean daily minimum °C (°F) | −3.1 (26.4) | −3.8 (25.2) | −1.3 (29.7) | 1.8 (35.2) | 5.2 (41.4) | 9.7 (49.5) | 11.9 (53.4) | 11.8 (53.2) | 8.3 (46.9) | 5.2 (41.4) | 0.9 (33.6) | −1.8 (28.8) | 3.7 (38.7) |
| Record low °C (°F) | −13.5 (7.7) | −15.5 (4.1) | −13.9 (7.0) | −9.4 (15.1) | −4.8 (23.4) | 0.0 (32.0) | 2.3 (36.1) | 4.5 (40.1) | −0.7 (30.7) | −5.8 (21.6) | −10.0 (14.0) | −14.3 (6.3) | −15.5 (4.1) |
| Average precipitation mm (inches) | 57.6 (2.27) | 57.0 (2.24) | 56.7 (2.23) | 89.3 (3.52) | 102.4 (4.03) | 93.6 (3.69) | 72.1 (2.84) | 52.5 (2.07) | 75.7 (2.98) | 124.4 (4.90) | 147.1 (5.79) | 84.7 (3.33) | 1,013.1 (39.89) |
| Average precipitation days (≥ 1.0 mm) | 5.2 | 6.1 | 6.6 | 8.9 | 11.1 | 9.8 | 7.7 | 6.1 | 7.6 | 7.2 | 8.1 | 5.9 | 90.3 |
| Mean monthly sunshine hours | 176.9 | 176.7 | 218.6 | 201.7 | 211.6 | 245.6 | 290.5 | 265.6 | 210.4 | 193.6 | 155.9 | 166.5 | 2,513.6 |
Source: Meteociel

== See also ==
- Communes of the Alpes-Maritimes department
