= Michel Mouillot =

French politician

Michel Mouillot is a former French politician. He used to be mayor of the town of Cannes until 1996 arrest and criminal conviction of corruption with subsequent imprisonment.

== Bibliography ==
- Un complot en Provence, Ed. Laurens, Paris, 1998
- Tous mouillés, Ed. Michel Lafon, Paris, 2004
