= Saint-Sauveur-sur-Tinée =

Commune in Provence-Alpes-Côte d'Azur, France

- Commune
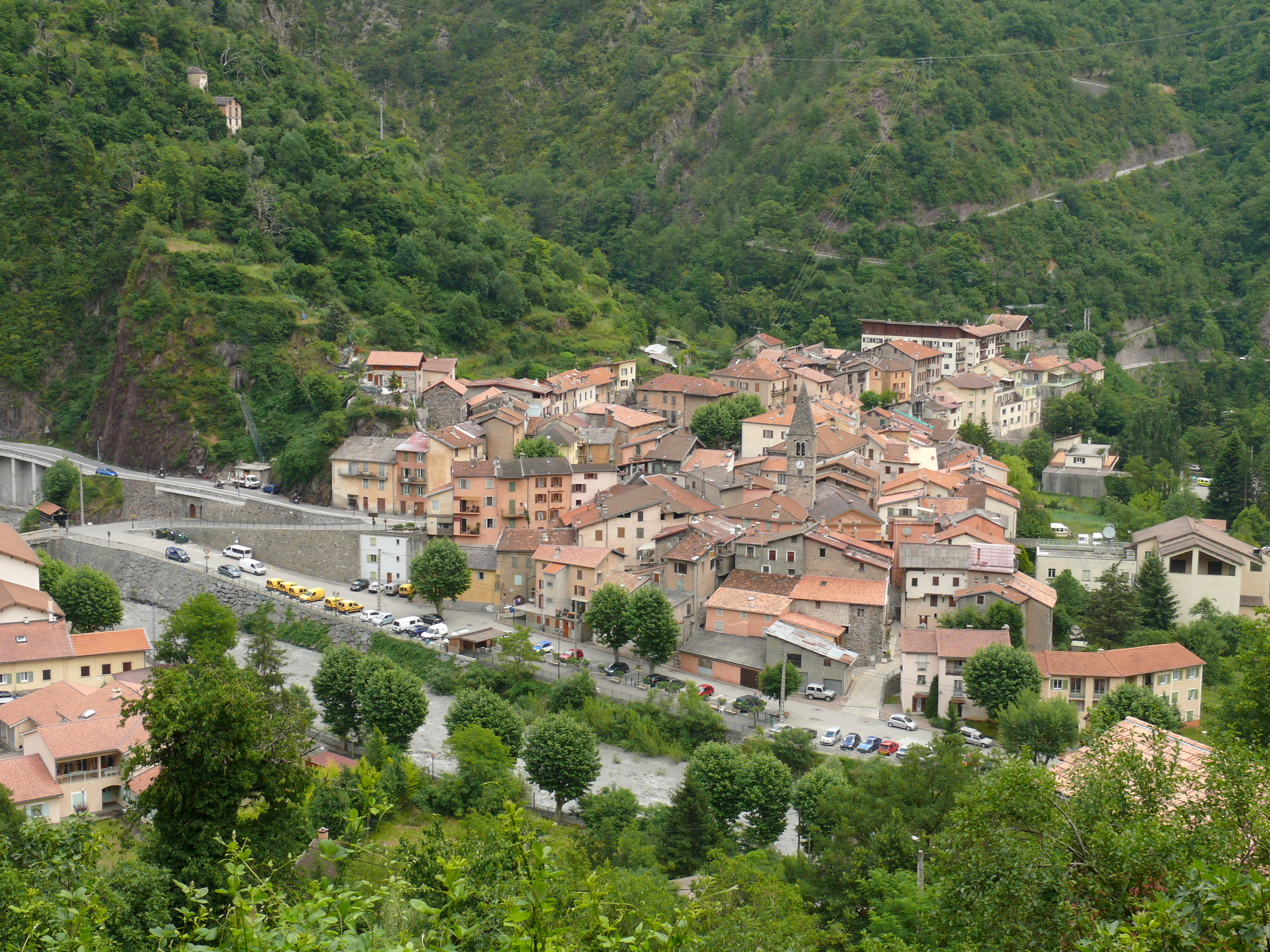
- A general view from the Roubion road

- Coat of arms
- Location of Saint-Sauveur-sur-Tinée
- Location within France Location within Provence-Alpes-Côte d'Azur
- Coordinates: 44°05′05″N 7°06′20″E
- Country: France
- Region: Provence-Alpes-Côte d'Azur
- Department: Alpes-Maritimes
- Arrondissement: Nice
- Canton: Tourrette-Levens
- Intercommunality: Métropole Nice Côte d'Azur

Government
  - Mayor (2026–32): Jean Merra
- Area^{1}: 32.28 km^{2} (12.46 sq mi)
- Elevation: 496 m (1,627 ft)
- Highest elevation: 2,708 m (8,885 ft)
- Lowest elevation: 432 m (1,417 ft)
- Population (2023): 290
  - Density: 9.0/km^{2} (23/sq mi)
- Demonym: Blavets
- Time zone: UTC+01:00 (CET)
  - Summer (DST): UTC+02:00 (CEST)
- INSEE/Postal code: 06129 /06420
- ^{1} French Land Register data, which excludes lakes, ponds, glaciers > 1 km^{2} (0.386 sq mi or 247 acres) and river estuaries.

Saint-Sauveur-sur-Tinée (French pronunciation: [sɛ̃ sovœʁ syʁ tine], literally Saint-Sauveur on Tinée; Vivaro-Alpine: Sant Sarvaor; Italian: San Salvatore di Tinea) is a commune in the Alpes-Maritimes department in the Provence-Alpes-Côte d'Azur region in southeastern France.

== Population ==
Its inhabitants are called Blavets or Sansavornins in French.

Historical population
Year	Pop.	±% p.a.
1968	436	—
1975	386	−1.73%
1982	368	−0.68%
1990	337	−1.09%
1999	337	+0.00%
2007	346	+0.33%
2012	347	+0.06%
2017	308	−2.36%
2023	290	−1.00%
Source: INSEE

== See also ==
- Communes of the Alpes-Maritimes department
