= 2016 Nice truck attack =

2016 Islamist terrorist attack in France

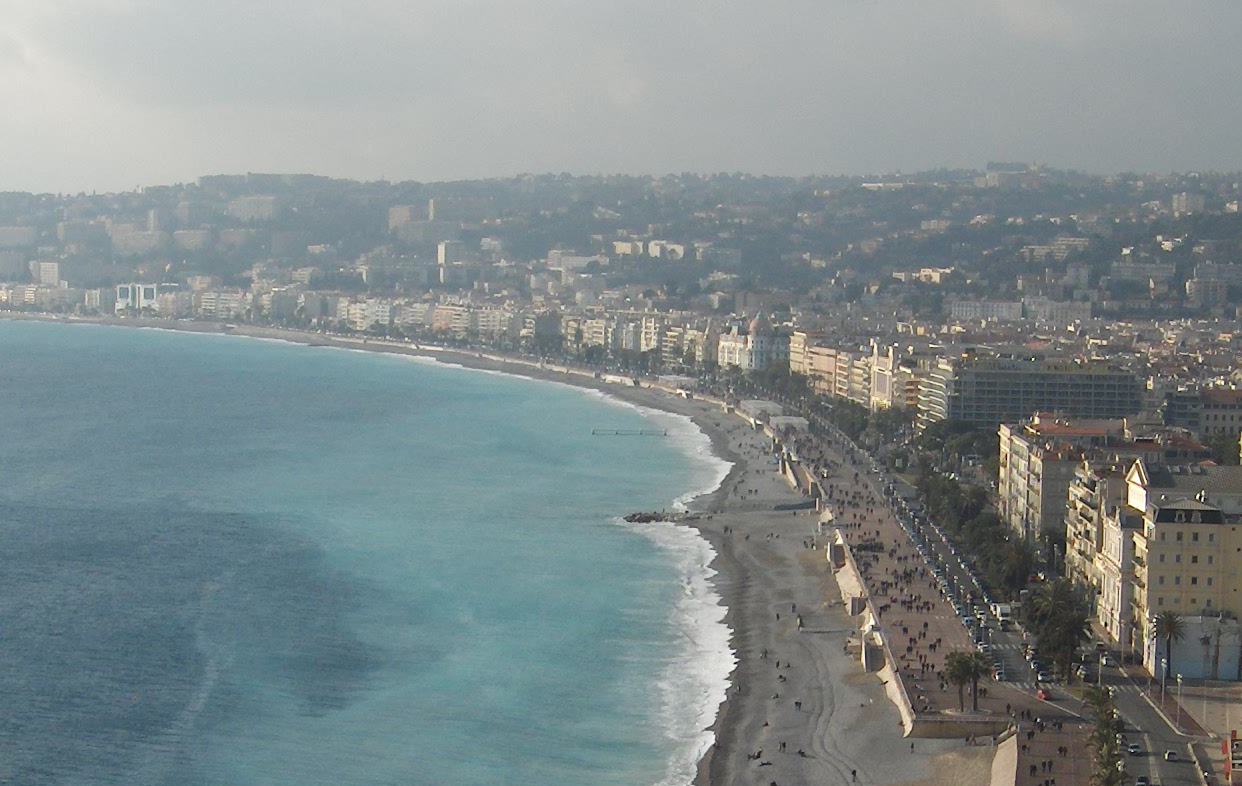
- The Promenade des Anglais, the site of the attack

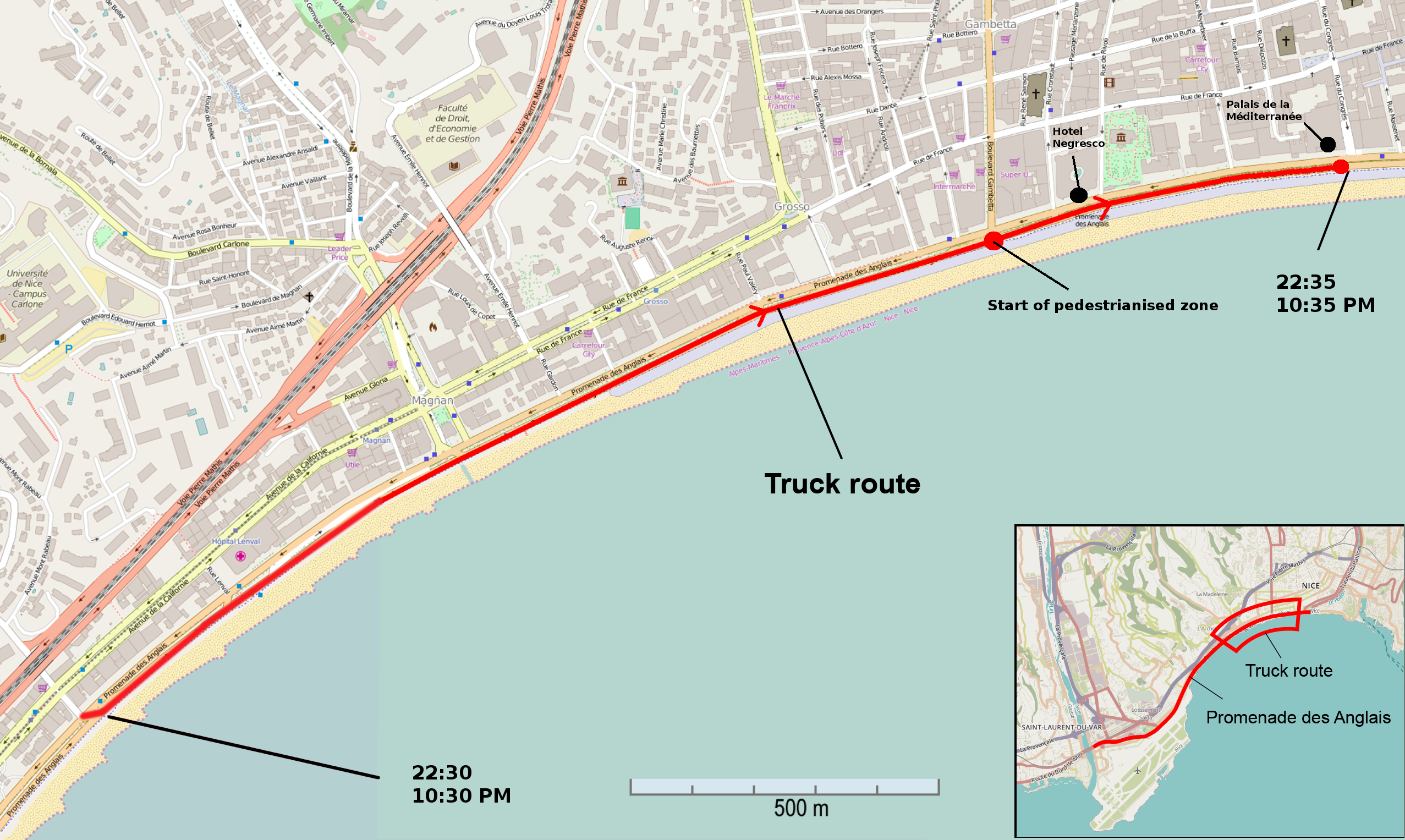
- Route of the attacker from west to east
- Location: 43.6936°N 7.2557°E; Promenade des Anglais, Nice, France
- Date: 14 July 2016; 10 years ago c. 22:30 – 22:35 CEST
- Target: People attending or participating in a Bastille Day parade
- Attack type: Vehicle-ramming attack
- Weapons: 19-tonne Renault Midlum 270 cargo truck; .32-caliber semi-automatic handgun
- Deaths: 87 (including the perpetrator)
- Injuries: 458
- Perpetrator: Mohamed Lahouaiej-Bouhlel
- Motive: Islamic extremism

On the evening of 14 July 2016, a 19-tonne cargo truck was deliberately driven into crowds of people celebrating Bastille Day on the Promenade des Anglais in Nice, France, resulting in the deaths of 86 people (Note: Eighty-four of the victims died on the day of the attack, the 85th victim died three weeks later and the 86th victim died a month after the attack.) and injuring 458 others. The driver was Mohamed Lahouaiej-Bouhlel, a Tunisian living in France. The attack ended following an exchange of gunfire, during which he was shot and killed by police.

The Islamic State claimed responsibility for the attack, saying Lahouaiej-Bouhlel answered its "calls to target citizens of coalition nations that fight the Islamic State". On 15 July, François Molins, the prosecutor for the Public Ministry, which oversaw the investigation, said the attack bore the hallmarks of jihadist terrorism.

On 15 July, French president François Hollande called the attack an act of Islamic terrorism, announced an extension of the state of emergency (which had been declared following the November 2015 Paris attacks) for a further three months, and announced an intensification of French airstrikes on ISIL in Syria and Iraq. France later extended the state of emergency until 26 January 2017. The French government declared three days of national mourning starting on 16 July. Thousands of extra police and soldiers were deployed while the government called on citizens to join the reserve forces.

On 21 July, prosecutor François Molins said that Lahouaiej-Bouhlel planned the attack for months and had help from accomplices. By 1 August, six suspects had been taken into custody on charges of "criminal terrorist conspiracy", three of whom were also charged for complicity in murder in relation to a terrorist enterprise. On 16 December three further suspects, allegedly involved in the supply of illegal weapons to Lahouaiej-Bouhlel, were charged.

On 13 December 2022, eight people accused of helping the attacker were found guilty and given sentences ranging from two to 18 years. The attack has been classified as jihadist terrorism by Europol.

== Background ==
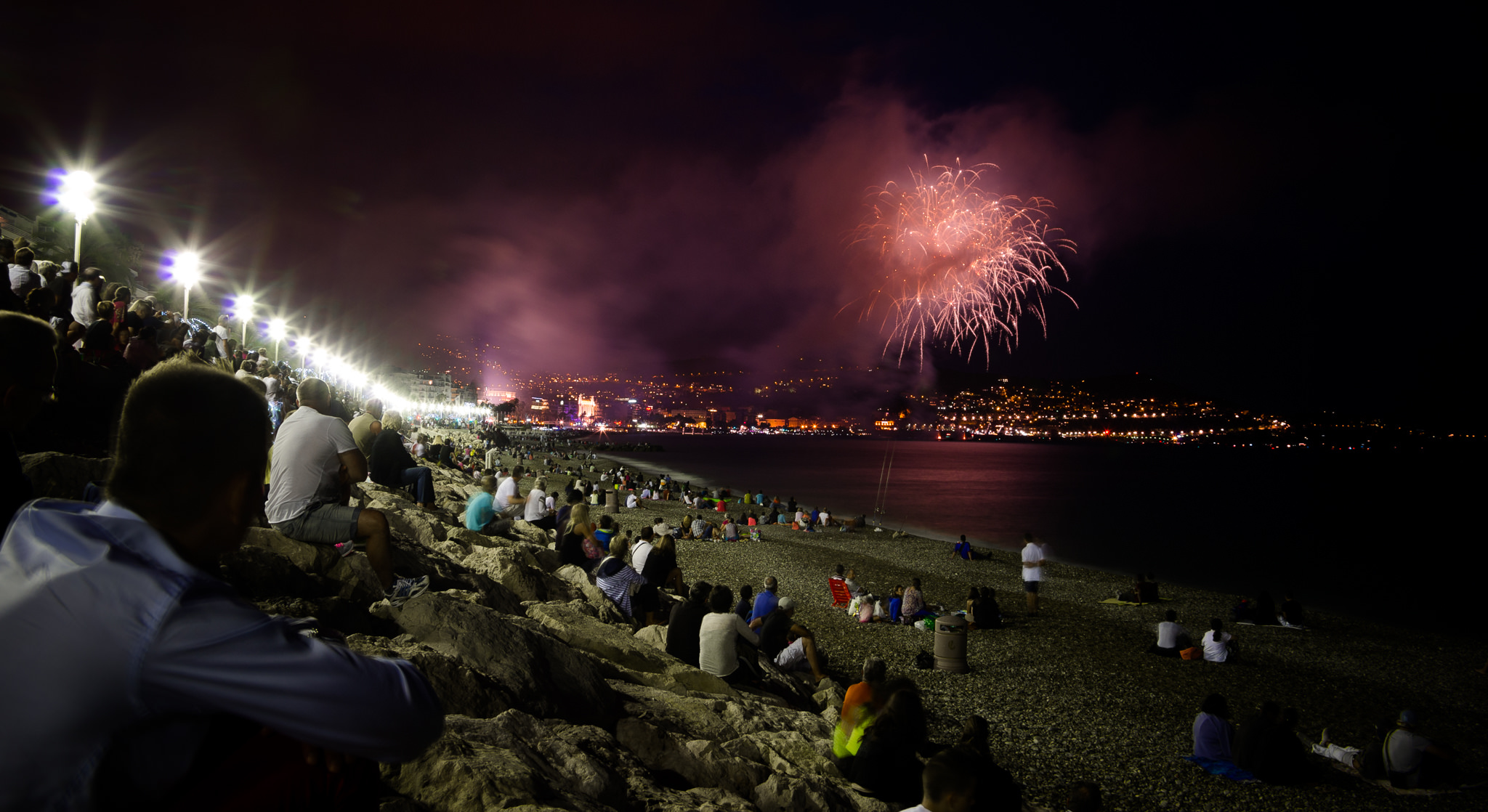
Bastille Day celebrations on beach below Promenade des Anglais, 2014

On the morning before the attack, French President François Hollande said the national state of emergency, put in place after the November 2015 Paris attacks, would end after the 2016 Tour de France finished on 26 July 2016. France had just finished hosting the Euro 2016 football tournament, during which the country had extensive security measures in place. Some matches were played in Nice, ending with the England–Iceland match on 27 June.

On the evening of 14 July in Nice, the Bastille Day celebrations on the waterfront Promenade des Anglais, dubbed "Prom'Party" by the city of Nice, drew crowds of 30,000 and included an aerial display by the French Air Force.

The Promenade des Anglais had been closed to traffic and, as in preceding years, a long section had been converted into a pedestrian zone. The customary Bastille Day fireworks display took place between 22:00 and 22:20.

== Attack ==
Timeline of attack

11 July:

- Mohamed Lahouaiej-Bouhlel rented a 19-tonne Renault Midlum 270 cargo truck in Saint-Laurent-du-Var.

14 July:

- 21:34 – Lahouaiej-Bouhlel is reported to have arrived on a bicycle in the Auriol quarter of Nice to collect the parked truck.
- c. 22:00 – Lahouaiej-Bouhlel is reported to have arrived in Magnan quarter of Nice.
- 22:27 – Lahouaiej-Bouhlel is reported to have sent an SMS message asking for more weapons.
- c. 22:30 – Lahouaiej-Bouhlel drove the truck eastward onto Promenade des Anglais near the Fondation Lenval Children's Hospital.
- 22:33 – The municipal police at Centre Universitaire Méditerranéen reported the truck.
- 22:35:47 – The truck came to a halt next to the Palais de la Méditerranée hotel.
- c. 22:35 – Lahouaiej-Bouhlel was shot dead by police.
All times are CEST (UTC+2).

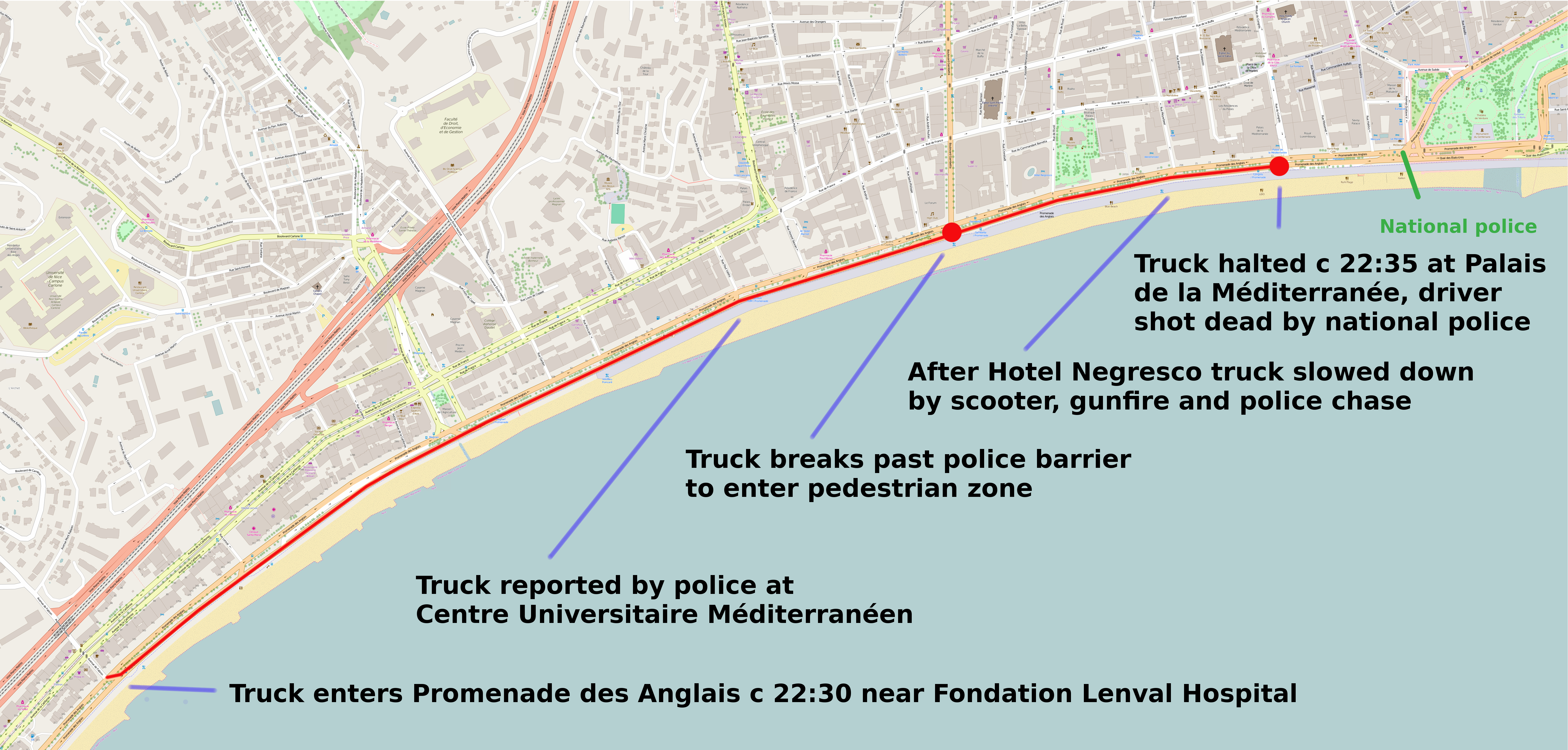
Annotated map showing course of attack along the Promenade des Anglais

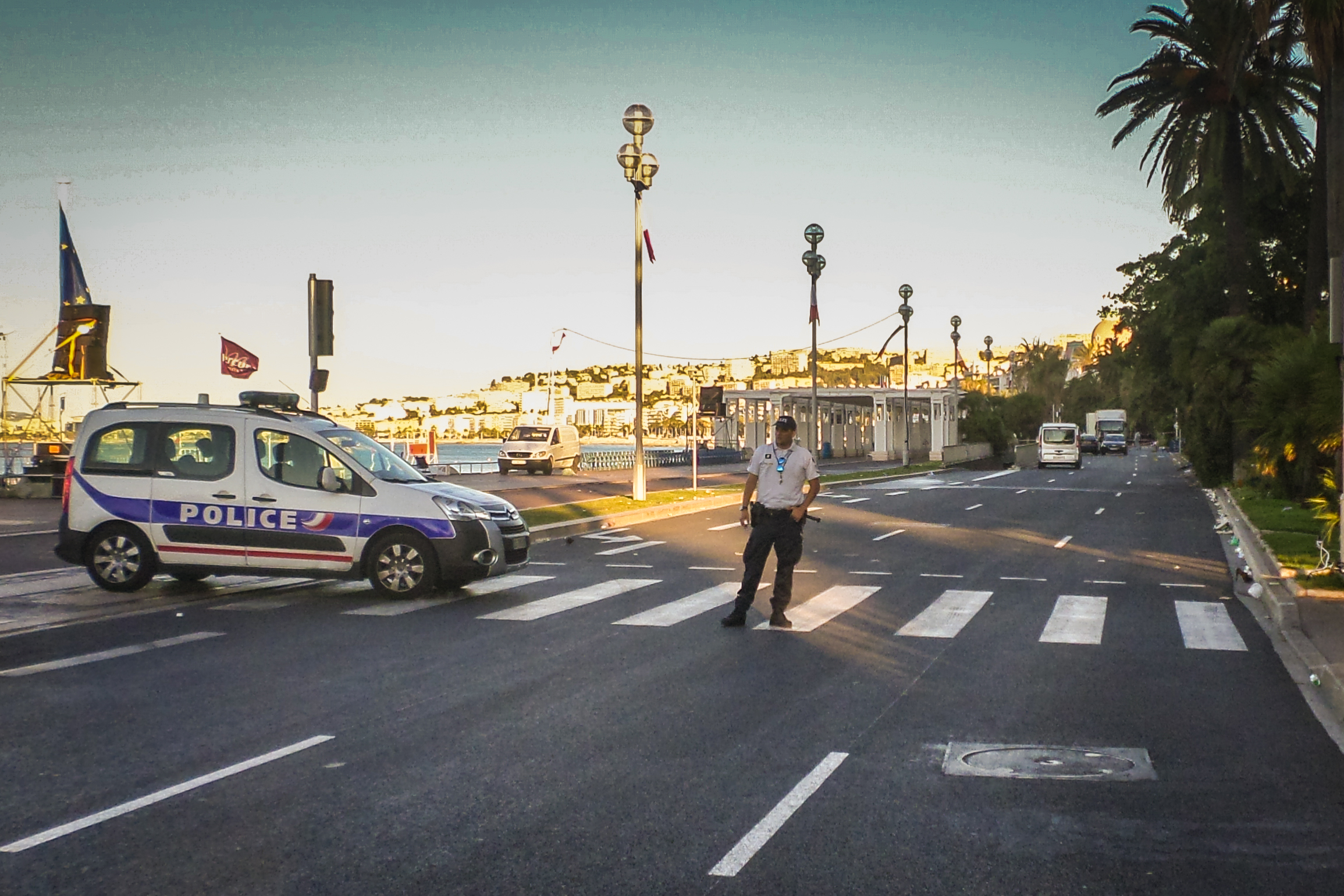
The white truck, a Renault Midlum, stopped in the distance (large white truck in distant middle lane) on the Promenade des Anglais on the morning after the attack

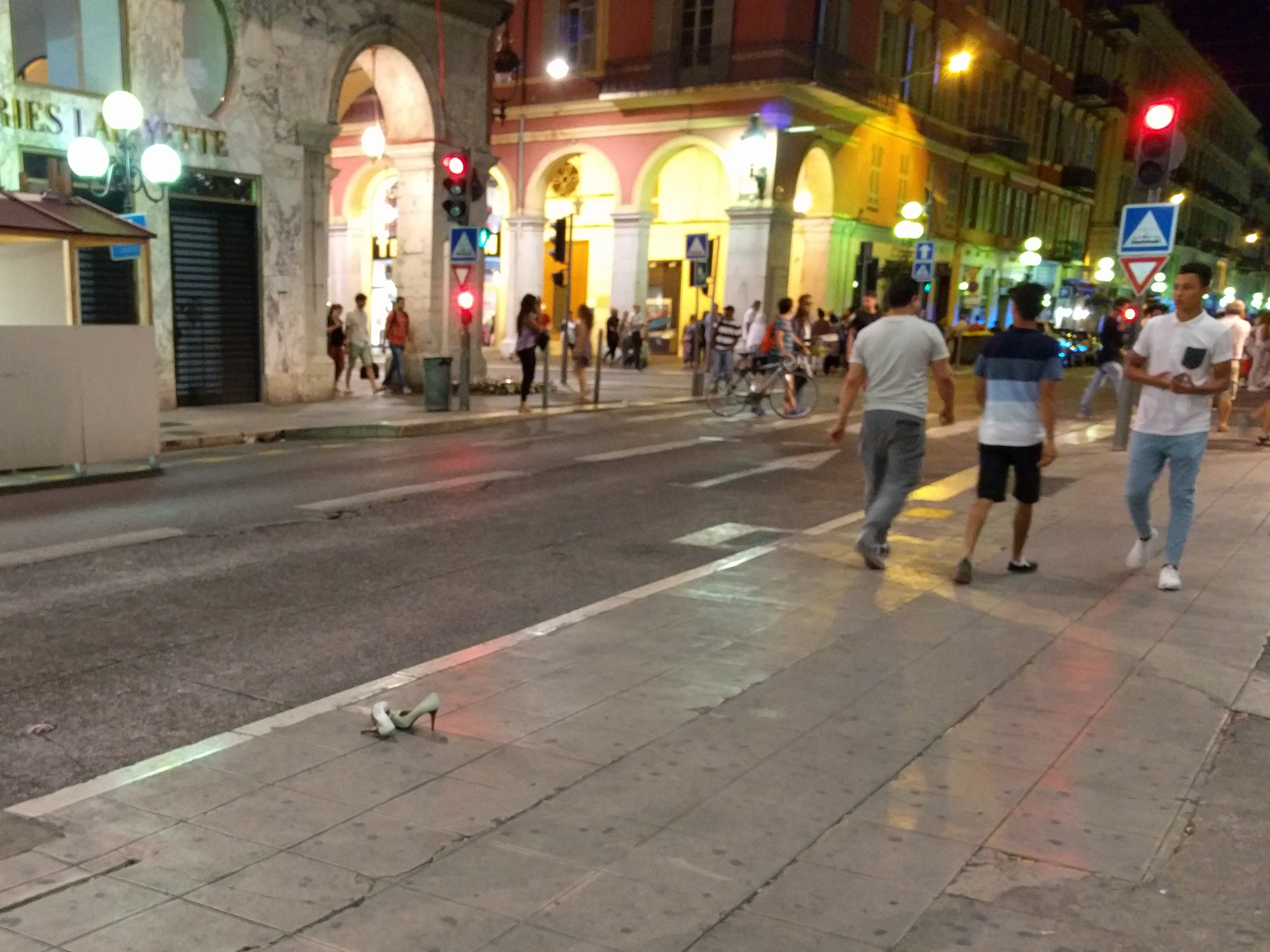
A pair of shoes lie on the ground shortly after the attack.

On 14 July in Nice, at approximately 22:30, just after the end of the Bastille Day fireworks display, a white 19-tonne Renault Midlum cargo truck emerged from the Magnan quarter of Nice turning eastward on to the Promenade des Anglais, then closed to traffic, near the Fondation Lenval Children's Hospital.

Travelling at close to 90 kilometres per hour (56 mph) and mounting the pavement as if out of control, it hit and killed numerous bystanders before passing the Centre Universitaire Méditerranéen, where it was first reported by municipal police. 400 metres (1,300 ft) from the children's hospital, at the intersection with Boulevard Gambetta, the truck accelerated and mounted the kerb to force its way through police barriers—a police car, a crowd control barrier and lane separators—marking the beginning of the pedestrianised zone.

Having broken through the barrier, the truck, moving in a zigzag fashion, knocked down random members of the crowd milling about on the pavement and in the three traffic lanes on the seaward side of the Promenade. The driver tried to keep the truck on the pavement—returning to the road only when blocked by a bus shelter or pavilion—thus increasing the number of deaths.

After reaching the Hotel Negresco, the truck, already travelling more slowly, was further slowed down by a passing cyclist, whose attempts to open the cabin door were abandoned after being threatened with a gun through the window. This was followed by a motorcyclist, who threw his scooter under the front wheels of the truck at the intersection with rue Meyerbeer, mounted the truck's running board and struck the driver before being hit with the butt of the driver's gun, suffering moderate injuries as he fell off the truck. The driver fired several shots at police from his 7.65 mm firearm, close to the Hotel Negresco, as police arrived; they returned fire with their 9mm Sig Sauer handguns, gave chase, and attempted to disable the vehicle.

The truck travelled a further 200 metres (660 ft) until, in a badly damaged state, it came to halt at 22:35 next to the Palais de la Méditerranée approximately five minutes after the start of the attack. There, two national police officers shot and killed the driver.

=== Immediate aftermath ===
Multiple bullet holes were seen in the windscreen and cab of the truck. The entire attack took place over a distance of 1.7 kilometres (1.1 mi), between numbers 11 and 147 of the Promenade des Anglais, resulting in the deaths of 86 people and creating high levels of panic in the crowds. Some were injured as a result of jumping onto the pebbled beach several metres below the Promenade.

In addition to the firearm used during the attack, an ammunition magazine, a fake Beretta pistol, a dummy grenade, a replica Kalashnikov rifle, and a replica M16 rifle were found in the cabin of the truck. Also recovered were a mobile phone and personal documents, including an identity card, a driver's licence, and credit cards. There were several pallets and a bicycle in the rear of the truck.

== Perpetrator ==
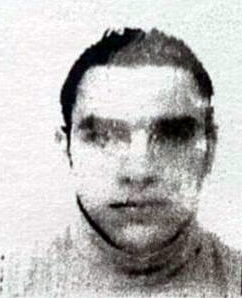
Lahouaiej-Bouhlel, on his residency permit

=== Personal life ===
French police identified the perpetrator as Mohamed Lahouaiej-Bouhlel, a 31-year-old man of Tunisian nationality, born in Tunisia, with a French residency permit and living in Nice. His parents live in Tunisia and had rarely heard from him since he moved to France in 2005. His father said Lahouaiej-Bouhlel underwent psychiatric treatment before he moved to France. He married a French-Tunisian cousin, living in Nice, with whom he had three children. According to his wife's lawyer, he was repeatedly reported for domestic violence and the couple separated.

After this separation, Lahouaiej-Bouhlel had a wild sex life according to the prosecutor, and had engaged in sexual relations with both men and women, according to an unnamed source. He was known to French police for five prior criminal offences, notably for threatening behaviour, violence, and petty theft. Neighbours reported that Lahouaiej-Bouhlel rarely spoke to them.

François Molins, the prosecutor leading the inquiry into the possible involvement of organised Islamist terrorism, announced on 18 July that information gathered since the attack suggested that, except for a short period leading up to the attack, Lahouaiej-Bouhlel was "a young man completely uninvolved in religious issues and not a practising Muslim, who ate pork, drank alcohol, took drugs and had an unbridled sex life."

Lahouaiej-Bouhlel sent small sums of money regularly to his family in Tunisia, according to his brother. Days before the attack, in a surprising move, Lahouaiej-Bouhlel persuaded some friends to smuggle bundles of cash worth 100,000 euros illegally to his family.

=== Motives ===
The investigation suggested that Lahouaiej-Bouhlel became radicalised shortly before the attack. Prosecutor Molins said that Lahouaiej-Bouhlel had a "clear, recent interest in the radical jihadist movement". Newspapers reported, on the authority of investigators, that evidence found on Lahouaiej-Bouhlel's cellphone showed he may have been in contact with individuals in his neighborhood who were known to the French intelligence agencies as Islamic radicals. An intelligence source cautioned that this "could just be a coincidence, given the neighbourhood where he lived. Everyone knows everyone there. He seems to have known people who knew Omar Diaby", a known local Islamist believed to be linked with Al-Nusra Front.

Lahouaiej-Bouhlel's computer showed he had carried out Internet searches on the topics "terrible fatal accidents", "horrible fatal accidents", and "shocking video, not for sensitive people" and consulted news articles on fatal accidents, including on 1 January 2016 an article or a photo from a local newspaper about a car crash with the caption: "He deliberately crashes onto the terrace of a restaurant".

According to French authorities, friends of Lahouaiej-Bouhlel said he began attending a mosque in April 2016. Prosecutor Molins said Lahouaiej-Bouhlel had expressed admiration for ISIL to one of the now-interrogated suspects. A few months before the attack, Lahouaiej-Bouhlel had shown friends an ISIL beheading video on his phone, and had said to one of the now-arrested suspects, "I'm used to seeing that". Lahouaiej-Bouhlel's computer contained photos of ISIL fighters and ISIL beheadings, of dead bodies, of Osama bin Laden, Algerian jihadist Mokhtar Belmokhtar, the Islamic State flag, a cover of Charlie Hebdo, and images linked to radical Islamism.

In the weeks before the attack, Lahouaiej-Bouhlel consulted many websites with treatises on Quranic surahs, sites with Islamic religious chants, and sites of ISIL propaganda. He also expressed extremist views, friends told the police. An uncle of Lahouaiej-Bouhlel in Tunisia said that his nephew had been indoctrinated about ten days before the attack by an Algerian ISIL member in Nice. Lahouaiej-Bouhlel grew a beard only eight days before the attack, which he told friends was for religious reasons. An eyewitness interviewed by the newspaper Nice-Matin recounted hearing, from his balcony, "Allahu Akbar" being shouted three times during the attack; similar claims were circulated on social media and in the press. Officials have not confirmed the shouting of "Allahu Akbar", while the BBC reported that the rumours about it on social media were "fake".

=== Preparations ===
Lahouaiej-Bouhlel's mobile phone, found in the truck after he was shot by police, gave police information about his preparations. On 12 and 13 July 2016, Bouhlel returned several times to the Promenade des Anglais, the site of the attack, surveying the area in the rented truck. On 12 July, he took some selfies on the Promenade, as Molins confirmed on 18 July. Lahouaiej-Bouhlel's brother said he received images of Lahouaiej-Bouhlel laughing among the holiday crowds in Nice hours before the attack.

== Victims ==
On the day, 84 people were killed and 450 injured, 52 critically; 25 remained on life support the next day; two further people died from their injuries three weeks and just over a month after the attack. On 17 July, 65 injured were still in hospital, 18 in critical condition. Fourteen of the dead were children. 434 people were admitted into hospital with injuries due to the attack; some of whom were not admitted immediately. Of the 86 dead, 43 were French nationals and the remaining 43 were foreign nationals of eighteen countries. A regional Islamic association claimed "more than one third" of the victims were Muslims, as did survivors.

By 19 July, French authorities had formally identified the initial 84 victims, with detailed lists published by Agence France-Presse. Two days later, the Hôtel de Ville in Nice was draped with two long black banners recording the names of those victims.

Nationalities of victims
| Nationality | Dead | Injured | Ref. |
|---|---|---|---|
| France | 46 | 391 | |
| Italy | 8 | 4 | |
| Germany | 5 | 2 | |
| Kazakhstan | 4 | | |
| United States | 3 | | |
| Algeria | 2 | | |
| Tunisia | 2 | | |
| Estonia | 2 | 2 | |
| Russia | 2 | 3 (Note: Including: 2 dual Estonian-Russian citizens) | |
| Switzerland | 2 | | |
| Poland | 2 | | |
| Romania | 1 | 4 | |
| Madagascar | 1 | 4 | |
| Morocco | 1 | 1 | |
| Brazil | 1 | 3 | |
| Ukraine | 1 | 2 | |
| Belgium | 1 | | |
| Armenia | 1 | | |
| Georgia | 1 | | |
| Australia | | 3 | |
| Portugal | | 4 | |
| Netherlands | | 2 | |
| China | | 3 | |
| Czech Republic | | 1 | |
| Hungary | | 1 | |
| Ireland | | 1 | |
| Malaysia | | 1 | |
| Singapore | | 1 | |
| United Kingdom | | 1 | |
| Total | 86 | 434 | |

== Investigation ==
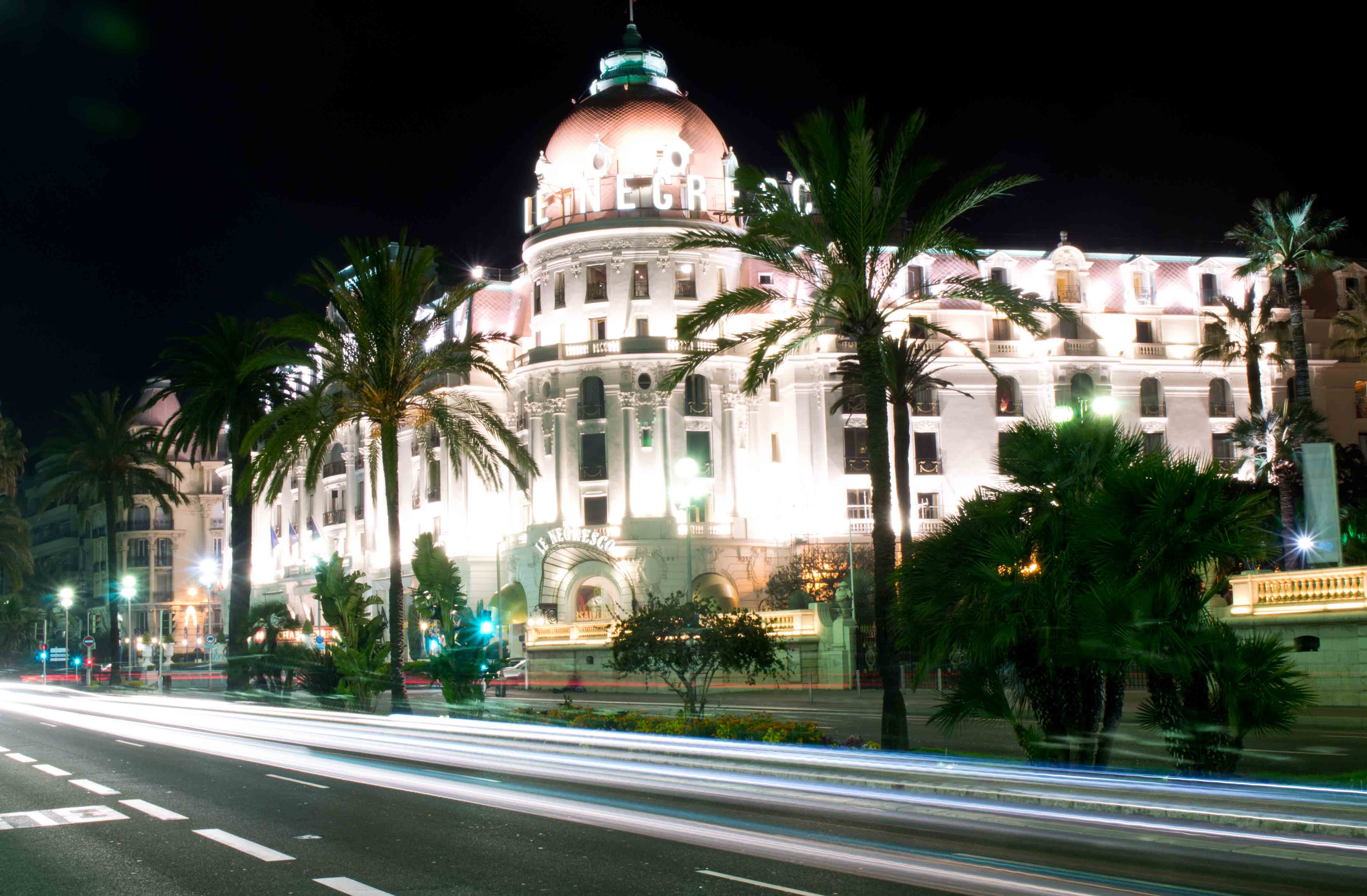
Hotel Negresco on the Promenade des Anglais was used for triage of the victims.

Late on 14 July, the ministère public of Paris, which has national responsibility for combating terrorism, opened an inquiry into "murder and attempted murder by an organised gang connected to a terrorist organisation" and "criminal terrorist conspiracy". The investigations for the inquiry were assigned to the Central Directorate of the Judicial Police (DCPJ) and the General Directorate for Internal Security (DGSI).

- On 15 July, prosecutor François Molins of the ministère public in Paris said that Lahouaiej-Bouhlel appeared to have not been known to French or Tunisian intelligence agencies to have ties to terror groups, nor was he registered as a national security risk (fiche "S") with French authorities.
- On 17 July, Minister of the Interior Cazeneuve said he believed Lahouaiej-Bouhlel had been radicalised quickly, and Molins said Lahouaiej-Bouhlel had a "clear, recent interest in the radical jihadist movement".
- On 18 July, Molins said the attack could be described as "terrorism" as defined by French law.
- On 21 July, Molins announced that Lahouaiej-Bouhlel seemed to have planned the attack for several months and to have received assistance.

=== Arrests ===
Lahouaiej-Bouhlel's estranged wife was arrested on 15 July, but was released two days later. Also, a man was arrested on 15 July. On 16 July, three other men were arrested. On 17 July, a man and his wife, both Albanians, were arrested in Nice following a police raid the previous day.

On 25 July, two more men were arrested after photographs of them were found on Lahouaiej-Bouhlel's mobile phone. One was released after five days, while the other was charged with conspiracy in relation to a terrorist enterprise.

By 21 July 2016, three men of Tunisian origin and an Albanian couple, all previously unknown to the French intelligence agencies, had been charged by the ministère public with "criminal conspiracy in relation to a terrorist enterprise". Three other men were later charged with complicity in the attack.

== Trial of accomplices ==
In September 2022, the trial of eight people charged with complicity began in Paris. and in December 2022, all were found guilty.

- Mohamed Walid Ghraieb, a French-Tunisian born in Tunisia, aged 40 or 41 at the time of the attack. In January 2015, shortly after the attack on Charlie Hebdo, Ghraieb had sent a text message to Lahouaiej-Bouhlel saying, "I am not Charlie ... I am happy, they have brought soldiers of Allah to finish the job." (Note: Je ne suis pas Charlie ... Je suis content. Ils ont ramené les soldats d'Allah pour finir le travail, a reference to the phrase Je suis Charlie) Between July 2015 and July 2016, Ghraieb and Bouhlel phoned one another 1,278 times. Photos on Lahouaiej-Bouhlel's mobile phone, dated 11 and 13 July, showed him with Ghraieb in the truck used for the attack. The prosecutor, said that the suspect filmed the scene of the attack during the night of 14–15 July, when it was filled with emergency services and journalists, before taking a selfie.
- Chokri Chafroud, a Tunisian aged 37 at the time of the attack. Chafroud sent Lahouaiej-Bouhlel a Facebook message in April 2016, which read, "Load the truck with 2,000 tons of iron ... release the brakes my friend, and I will watch." (Note: Charge le camion, met dedans 2.000 tonnes de fer, et nique, coupe lui les freins mon ami, et moi je regarde.) Chafroud's fingerprints were found on the passenger door of the truck used in the attack, and CCTV footage showed him seated next to Lahouaiej-Bouhlel as he drove the truck along the Promenade des Anglais two days before the attack.

Ghraieb and Chafroud were each sentenced to 18 years in prison for "terrorist association". Their sentences were upheld on appeal on 13 June 2024.

- Ramzi Arefa, a French-Tunisian born in Nice, aged 21 at the time of the attack, was charged with having supplied the automatic pistol carried by the killer. On the night of the attack, at 22:27, he received a text message from Lahouaiej-Bouhlel: "I wanted to tell you that the pistol you brought me yesterday was very good, so bring five more from your friend's place. They're for Chokri and his friends". Ramzi A. had previous convictions for petty crime and drugs.

Arefa was sentenced to 12 years for having supplied the pistol. The prosecution acknowledged that Arefa did not know about the planned attack and that the pistol was not used.

The other five were convicted of weapons trafficking or criminal association and each was sentenced to two years in prison.

At the trial, testimony was heard from more than 260 victims and victims' relatives. Some travelled to the central Paris courtroom for the trial, while others followed it in Nice, via a live broadcast from the court.

In an article in The Guardian documenting his own reaction to reporting the trial, Robert McLiam Wilson recorded that “the average attendance is around six. One afternoon there were only two of us." But said of the witnesses “They were an unforgettable lesson in what it is to be human … all were heartbreakingly unanimous in how deeply corroded they were by guilt. The guilt of surviving, of not saving loved ones, of not sufficiently helping the injured or dying. All alike burned in its fire. The saddest of them were like broken toys, halting, bereft, devastating.”

== Reactions ==
=== French government ===
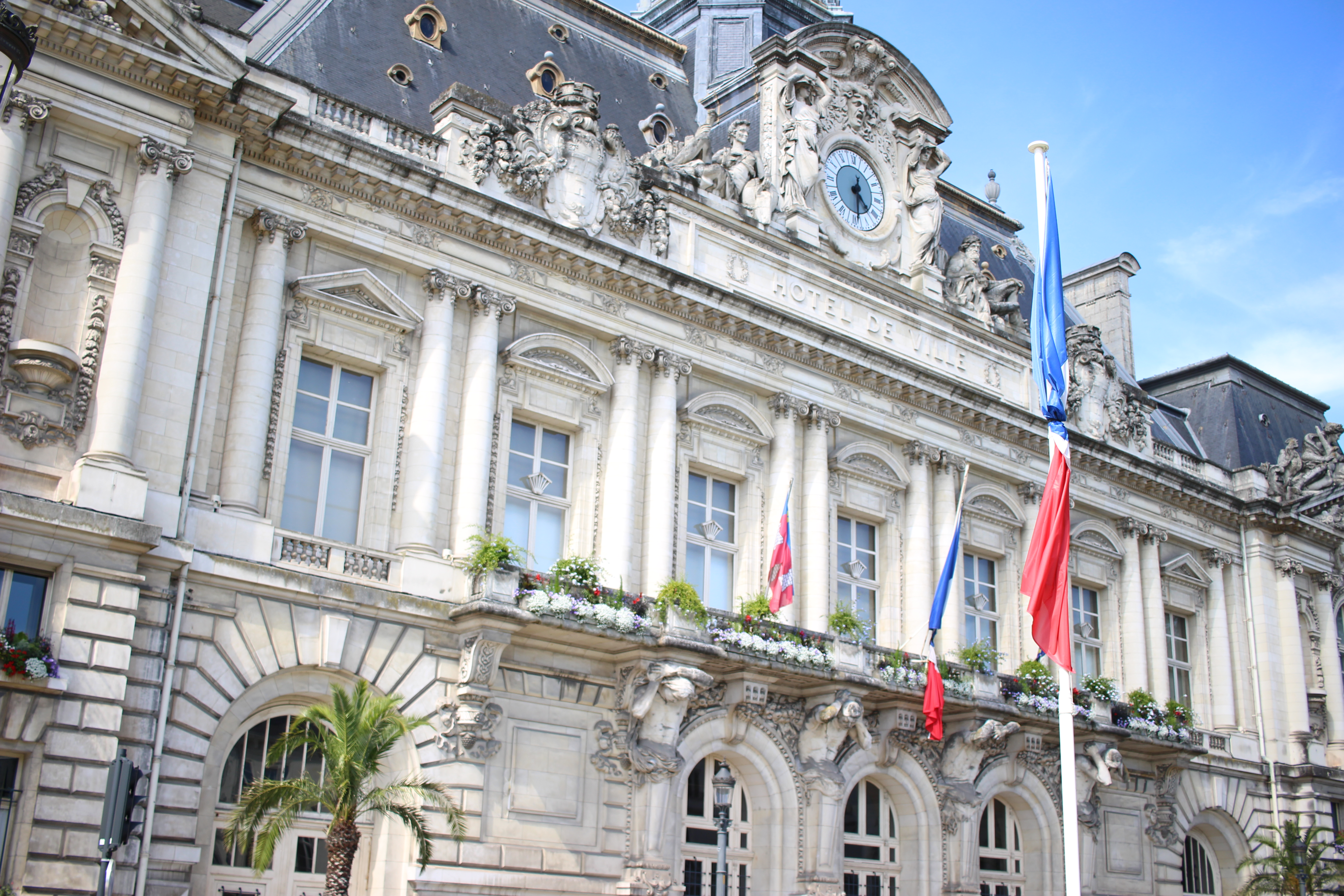
The French flag at half-mast in Tours on the day after the attack, which was followed by three days of national mourning

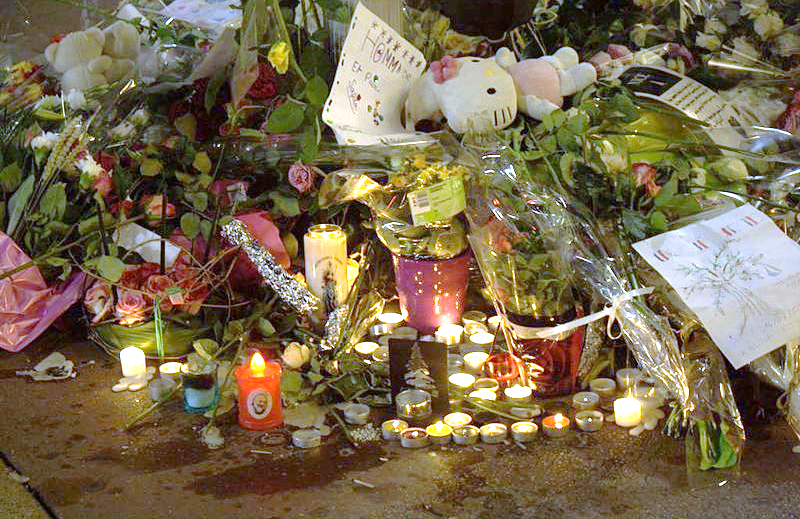
A memorial at the site of the attack

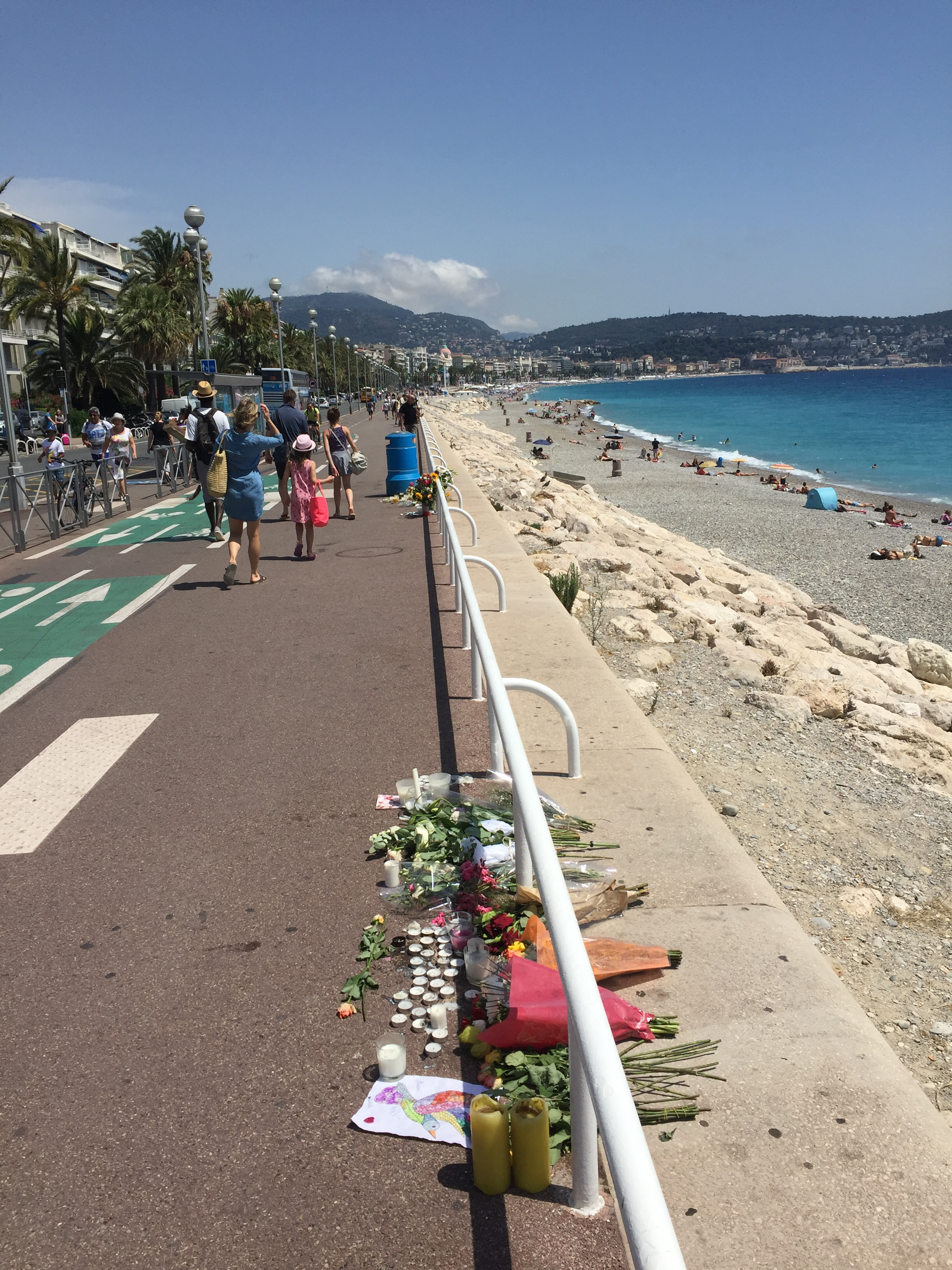
Tributes on the Promenade des Anglais

==== 15 July ====
French President François Hollande said that he had consulted Prime Minister Manuel Valls and Minister of the Interior Bernard Cazeneuve and was returning to Paris from Avignon, expecting to arrive in the French capital at 1:15 a.m. for an emergency Interior Ministry meeting regarding the attacks.

At 12:59 a.m., Cazeneuve initiated the ORSEC plan, the French emergency plan for disasters.

At 3:47 a.m., Hollande addressed the French nation in a televised broadcast from Paris. He stated that "the terrorist nature of this attack can't be denied" and linked the attack to Islamic terrorism, saying that "all of France is being menaced by fundamentalist Islamic terrorism". He announced a three-month extension of the state of emergency, previously due to end on 26 July, announced an intensification of French military efforts against ISIL in Syria and Iraq, and announced that more security personnel would be deployed.

Later that day, Prime Minister Manuel Valls announced three days of national mourning from 16 to 18 July.

On France 2's 15 July edition of its 8 p.m news programme, Valls said that Lahouaiej-Bouhlel was "probably linked to radical Islam one way or another". On TF1's news programme, airing at the same time as France 2's, Interior Minister Bernard Cazeneuve said, "We have an individual who was not known to intelligence services for activities linked to radical Islam"; when asked whether he could confirm that the attacker's motives were linked to jihadism, Cazeneuve replied, "No".

==== 16–17 July ====
On 16 July French Defence Minister Jean-Yves Le Drian said: "I remind you that Daesh's ideologue, Abu Muhammad al-Adnani, has for several weeks repeated calls to attack directly, even individually, Frenchmen, in particular, or Americans, wherever they are, by any means necessary ... It is murder, and Daesh's claim of responsibility comes later, as has happened in other recent events".

Bernard Cazeneuve on 16 July, after ISIL had claimed the attacker as one of its soldiers, said: if Lahouaiej-Bouhlel was radicalised, "It seems that he was radicalised very quickly — in any case these are the elements that have come up from the testimony of the people around him."

Cazeneuve on 16 or 17 July announced plans to increase security in response to the attack by calling 12,000 police reservists to add to the 120,000 person force. He urged "all patriotic citizens" to join the reserve forces to boost security following the attacks.

==== 18 July and later ====
On 18 July, France observed a one-minute silence in remembrance of those killed in the attack. In Nice, as the Prime Minister arrived to observe the silence, the crowd booed him and some shouted for his resignation, with some calling him a murderer. President Hollande was similarly booed by crowds when visiting Nice the day after the attack. The booing was described by BBC as "unprecedented", who commented that it was "a stark warning of how the mood in the country has changed" in comparison to public responses after other recent major terrorist attacks in France.

On 21 July, the state of emergency was formally extended until 31 January 2017.

A week after the attack, the anti-terror directorate of the National Police (SDAT) requested that the local authorities in Nice destroy CCTV footage of the attack, arguing that leaked images would compromise the dignity of victims and could be used as propaganda by terrorist organizations. The request has been refused by local authorities who have argued that the CCTV footage might provide evidence that the National Police had placed inadequate security measures on the Promenade des Anglais on 14 July.

On 26 July 2016, three Nice residents who had chased the truck during the attack were presented with medals for bravery by the local authorities in Nice.

On 14 July 2017, president Macron said during a remembrance ceremony in Nice "This rage, I know, many of you still carry it in the pit of your stomach, ... Everything will be done in order for the republic, the state and public authorities to regain your trust.”

=== French public ministry ===
François Molins, prosecutor of the ministère public (le parquet) in Paris – the authority ('public ministry') responsible for defending French society with regard to terrorism – stated on 15 July that the Nice attack bore the hallmarks of jihadist terrorism. On 18 July, Molins said the attack could be described as "terrorism" as defined by French law.

=== The Republicans ===
On 15 July, Alain Juppé, former prime minister of France and one of the final two candidates to become the Republican candidate for the April–May 2017 presidential election; and Christian Estrosi, former Nice mayor, raised the question of whether more could have been done to prevent the attack.

In September 2016, François Fillon, the other Republican candidate in the French presidential election, published a book titled "Defeating Islamic Totalitarianism" (Vaincre le totalitarisme islamique), in which he advocated a stricter state surveillance on the Muslim community and more attention to the French identity. He also wrote that France was "at war" with radical Islam.

=== National Front ===
Marine Le Pen, president of the National Front party and candidate for the April–May 2017 presidential election, said in a Le Figaro interview, "I'm furious, because I hear the same words, notice the same reflexes in the political class, but see no action that contributes one ounce of supplemental security". (Note: "Je suis très en colère, parce que j'entends les mêmes mots, constate les mêmes réflexes dans la classe politique, mais ne vois aucun acte apportant une once de sécurité supplémentaire.") She judged it "urgent to attack the ideology that is the basis of this terrorism" and regretted that "nothing" was decided for the closing down of the salafist mosques.

=== International ===
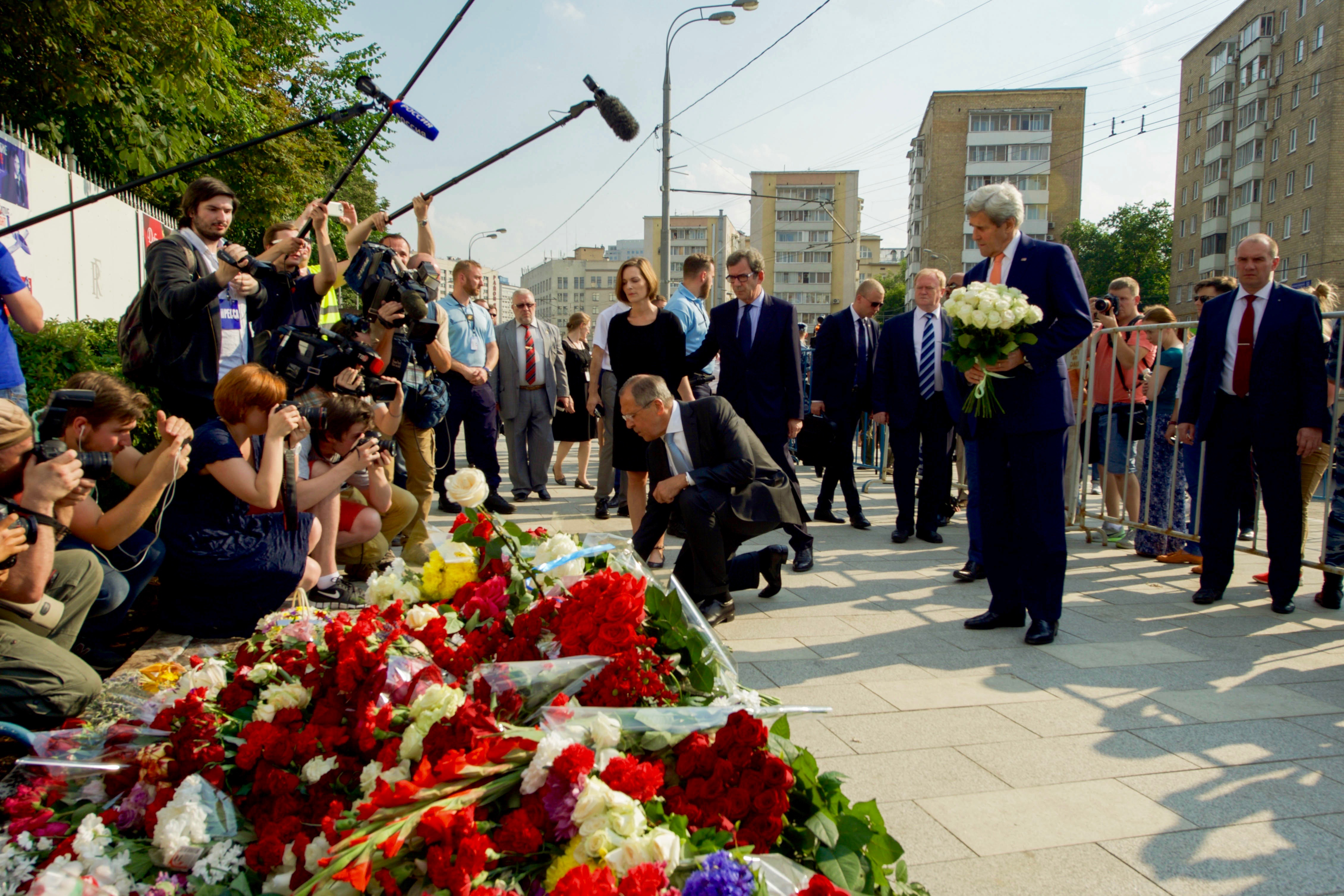
U.S. Secretary of State John Kerry and Russian Foreign Minister Sergey Lavrov lay flowers near French embassy in Moscow, 15 July 2016.

Leaderships of 49 countries and five supranational bodies expressed abhorrence of the attack and condolences for families and for France. US President Barack Obama labelled the attack as possible terrorism, as did German Chancellor Angela Merkel.

=== Claim of ISIL responsibility ===
On 16 July, the Amaq News Agency, called Lahouaiej-Bouhlel "a soldier of the Islamic State." It cited an "insider source" which said Lahouaiej-Bouhlel "executed the operation in response to calls to target citizens of coalition nations, which fight the Islamic State".

Later that same day, ISIL's official al-Bayan radio station said the attacker executed a "new, special operation using a truck" and "the crusader countries know that no matter how much they enforce their security measures and procedures, it will not stop the mujahideen from striking."

=== Islamic and Christian responses ===
The first Islamic funeral ceremony of victims of the attack took place on 19 July in the Ar-Rahma (The Mercifulness) mosque, the oldest in Nice and the largest in Alpes-Maritimes. Last honours of the Islamic community were rendered to a 23-year-old Tunisian woman, her 4-year-old child, and a young man. Rector and imam Otmane Aïssaoui said in his sermon, "The sole frontier for which one should halt is this: the respect for a man, for a woman, irrespective of their colour of skin, their origin. A truth one can find in the Gospel, in the Torah, even in Buddhism!" Citing a Quranic verse, he said, "At the Last Judgment, [Lahouaiej-Bouhlel] will be asked: 'why did you kill that little child of four years old?'"

Also invited to speak was the priest of the nearby Catholic church Saint-Pierre d'Ariane. Father Patrick Bruzzone said, "My brothers ... I say 'my brothers' because, today more than ever, when one man is hurt, the whole of humanity is hurt."

On 21 July, a commemoration was held for "people of all religions and even beyond that" in Catholic church Saint-Pierre d'Arène, located near the area where the attack had taken place. The priest and the vicar called for "the calming down, necessary for taking at hand our common future in this torn city and in the whole country. To contemplate together, in order to solidly reconstruct the social ties that now are increasingly crumbled and largely ruined".

On 24 September, Pope Francis met 800 family members of the victims of the attack in Rome.

=== Social media ===
Immediately after the attack, while it still remained unclear whether the threat had ended, people used social media, particularly Twitter, to help others find shelter, using the hashtag #PortesOuvertesNice (Open Doors Nice), a variation of a hashtag used in other recent attacks in France.

On 14 and 15 July, the French government urged social media users to share only reliable information from official sources, false rumours circulated that hostages had been taken, that the area around the Eiffel Tower had been set on fire, and that Cannes had also been attacked.

== Impact ==
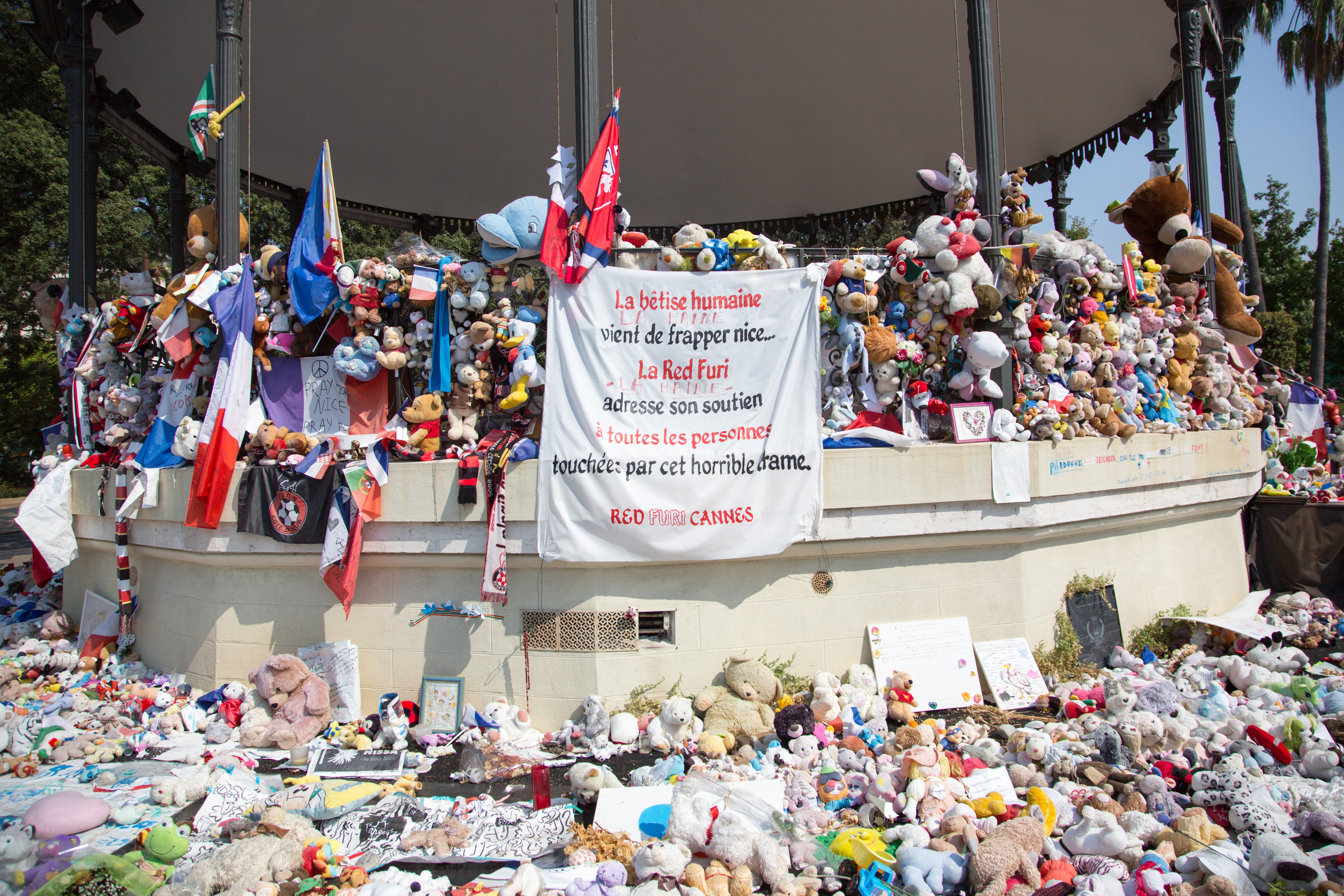
A memorial in Nice in September 2016

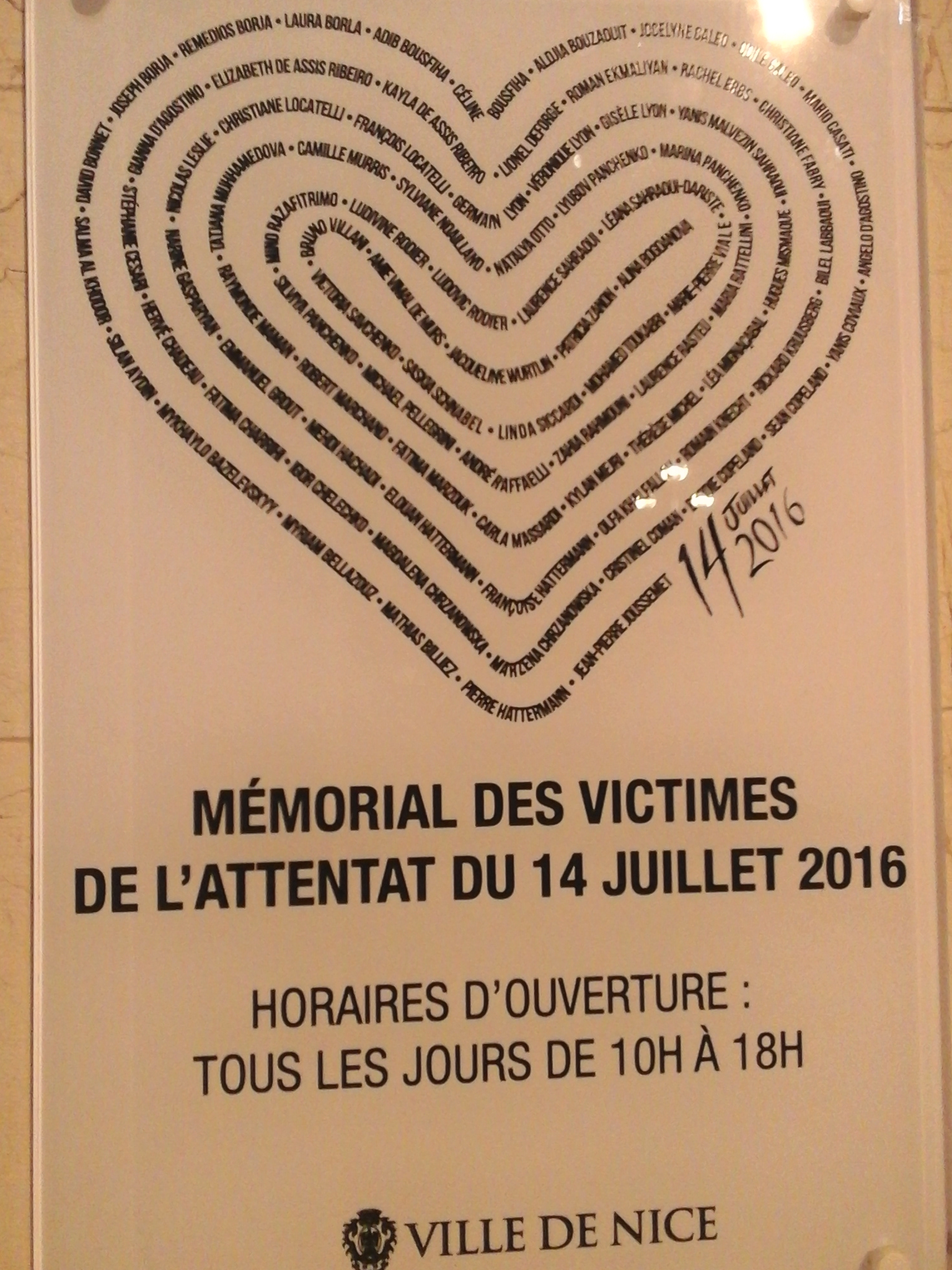
A memorial sign outside Musée Masséna, Nice

=== Cultural ===
Organisers of the 20th Nice Jazz Festival, scheduled to begin on 16 July, cancelled the event in the wake of the attack. Rihanna cancelled a concert scheduled as a part of her Anti World Tour for 15 July at Nice's Allianz Riviera. At London's Royal Albert Hall on 15 July, the opening night of the 2016 Proms Festival paid tribute to the people of Nice, with the BBC Symphony Orchestra performing a rendition of "La Marseillaise". In December 2016, an American musician faSade, who witnessed the attack, published a music video of a song that paid tribute to the victims, featuring images of the attack's aftermath.

In August, the European Cycling Union decided to move the 2016 European Road Championships, which were to be hosted on 14–18 September in Nice, to Plumelec in the northwest of France, due to security concerns in Nice after the 14 July attack.

Before the 2026 FIFA World Cup semi-final between France and Spain, held on the 10th anniversary of the attack, a minute of silence was observed to commemmorate the victims.

=== Financial markets ===
European stocks opened lower and then closed mixed on Friday 15 July (the day after the attacks) as investor sentiment was dampened by the attack in France. The pan-European STOXX 600 was down by 0.38%, the French CAC 40 by 0.4%, and German DAX by 0.4%. The British FTSE 100 fell by 0.2% before closing up by 0.22%, down at 0.32% in STOXX 600, 0.6% in CAC 40, and 0.01% in DAX. Airlines, along with other travel share, were some of the hardest hit companies, with Flybe and EasyJet down by around 3.7 per cent and three per cent respectively.

=== Tourism ===
Cancellations and last-minute changes to European holidays rose in the summer, with travellers increasingly concerned about the threat of terrorism. Other terrorist attacks in Belgium and Turkey prompted holidaymakers to cancel their bookings or seek out other destinations perceived to be safe. The Nice attack, along with the recent failed coup in Turkey, were expected to add to the pressure. "This is not going to be a good year," European Tour Operators Association chief executive Tom Jenkins said. "There is a real suppression of demand for destinations like Belgium and France."

=== Tensions between Muslims and non-Muslims ===
On the week after 14 July, some Nice inhabitants noticed and deplored increasing anti-Muslim and racist rhetoric in their quarters. Some non-Muslims said that their view on Muslims had changed. "We're in Europe and I think some of the oriental rites are somehow incompatible", a local man said.

Before the attack, on 8 June, the carcass of a pig had been found in front of a mosque in Nice. Two suspected men were charged and the court's judgement was expected to be filed on 12 October. On the morning of 11 October, the imam of that same mosque found the head and pelt of a pig mounted before the mosque's entrance.

=== Raids and house arrests under state of emergency ===
As of August 2016, under the state of emergency put in force since November 2015 and extended after the Nice attack, around 3,600 houses had been raided. The raids resulted in six terrorism-related inquiries, only one of which led to prosecution. Most raids were reportedly connected with narcotics, not with terrorism, implying misuse of the new powers of emergency. Previously, as of May 2016, under the emergency law, house arrest had been imposed on 404 people, mostly Muslims of North African descent. Many French citizens that were placed under house arrest allegedly lost jobs or employment opportunities as a result. By mid-November 2016, some people had been under house arrest for nearly a year during which no judicial inquiry against them had been started.

On 15 November, President Hollande announced his intention to prolong the state of emergency until the French presidential elections on 23 April and 7 May 2017.

== See also ==
- List of Islamist terrorist attacks
- List of massacres in France
- List of rampage killers (religious, political, or ethnic crimes)
