= Mohamed Lahouaiej-Bouhlel =

Tunisian terrorist (1985–2016)

- محمد لحويج بوهلال
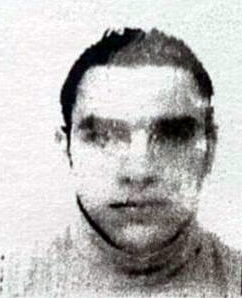
- ID photograph of Lahouaiej-Bouhlel
- Born: 3 January 1985; M'saken, Sousse Governorate, Tunisia
- Died: 14 July 2016 (aged 31); Nice, France
- Cause of death: Gunshot wound
- Known for: Perpetrator of the 2016 Nice truck attack

Details
- Country: France
- Locations: Promenade des Anglais, Nice
- Target: Bastille Day crowds
- Killed: 86
- Injured: 458
- Weapons: Renault Midlum cargo truck; .32-caliber semi-automatic handgun

Mohamed Salmene Lahouaiej-Bouhlel (French pronunciation: [mɔamɛd lauɛʒ bulɛl]; Arabic: محمد لحويج بوهلال, romanized: Muḥammad Laḥwiyyij-Būhlāl; 3 January 1985 – 14 July 2016) was a Tunisian terrorist and a mass murderer who perpetrated the 2016 Nice truck attack, in which he drove a truck into a crowd celebrating Bastille Day on the Promenade des Anglais in Nice, France, killing 86 and injuring another 458. Immediately after the attack, Lahouaiej-Bouhlel was shot dead by responding French police officers.

== Life ==
Lahouaiej-Bouhlel was born in M'saken, Tunisia, a small town about 10 kilometres (6 mi) outside the coastal city of Sousse. According to police reports, he had a French residency permit and moved to Nice in 2005, where he worked as a delivery-truck driver. He trained in martial arts, frequented salsa night clubs, and had an "unbridled sex life". Lahouaiej-Bouhlel was married, and had three children, but was in the process of divorcing. He was reported to have had financial difficulties and to have worked as a driver, acquiring a truck permit less than a year before the attack. In January 2016, he fell asleep at the wheel of a van, and was subsequently fired.

Lahouaiej-Bouhlel's parents are divorced. His father, who lives in the family's native town, told an international news agency that his son suffered from depression, drank alcohol and was a drug user: "From 2002 to 2004, he had problems that caused a nervous breakdown. He would become angry and he shouted ... he would break anything he saw in front of him." Lahouaiej-Bouhlel's sister Rabeb said that his family handed over documents to the police showing that he had been seeing psychologists for several years. His father and his younger brother insisted that the attack "had nothing to do with religion", stating that Lahouaiej-Bouhlel did not pray and never observed the holy month of Ramadan. His brother claimed that Lahouaiej-Bouhlel did not know people, never sent his family presents, and never said hello. He married a French-Tunisian cousin, living in Nice, with whom he had three children. According to his wife's lawyer, he was repeatedly reported for domestic violence and the couple separated.

The Times of India described Lahouaiej-Bouhlel as "mentally unstable", with a tumultuous personal life, which included drug use and consumption of violent online content. Police examination of his phone revealed what Sky News described as a "string" of relationships with both men and women, including an affair with a 73-year-old man.

In the days before the attack, Lahouaiej-Bouhlel let his beard grow and told people "the meaning of this beard is religious." French authorities stated that Lahouaiej-Bouhlel showed a passion for religion only recently; "Mohamed only started visiting a mosque in April," a witness stated. French investigator François Molins stated "Bouhlel had expressed support for the Islamic State."

Molins also found that from 1 July, Lahouaiej-Bouhlel made more or less daily Internet searches for verses of the Quran and "nasheeds". He also researched the Islamic holiday of Eid al-Fitr. Investigators found photos of dead bodies and images linked to radical Islamism on his computer, including the flag of the Islamic State; the cover of an issue of the French satirical magazine Charlie Hebdo, which had been attacked by gunmen in January 2015; and photos of Osama bin Laden and Algerian jihadist Mokhtar Belmokhtar. He also told friends he did not understand why IS could not hold territory and showed them a video of a beheading on his mobile phone. In response to their shock, he said he was "used to it". In addition, he had searched the Internet for the terms "terrible mortal accidents", "horrible mortal accidents" and "shocking video, not for sensitive souls" and consulted news articles on fatal accidents, including on 1 January 2016 an article or a photo from a local newspaper about a car incident with the caption: "He deliberately crashes onto the terrace of a restaurant".

According to media reports, Lahouaiej-Bouhlel was known to police for five prior criminal offenses, notably regarding armed violence. On 27 January 2016 he was put on probation for attacking a motorist with a wooden pallet after a traffic accident. He was convicted on 24 March 2016 and given a six-month suspended sentence on charges of violence with a weapon. Lahouaiej-Bouhlel was last arrested less than a month before the attack after a traffic accident in which he had been asleep at the wheel, and he remained subject to judicial supervision. He was, however, not registered as a national security risk (fiche "S") by French authorities.

Reports indicate Lahouaiej-Bouhlel often visited Tunisia, the last time being, as far as is known, some eight months prior to the attack.

=== Money transfer ===
Just days before the attack, Lahouaiej-Bouhlel sent €97,000 – €100,000 to relatives in Tunisia.

== Suspected affiliations ==
The newspaper Nice-Matin published an interview with an eyewitness who recounted hearing "Allahu Akbar" ("God is greatest") during the attack from his balcony, with similar reports being circulated by other news organizations and on social media. Officials have not confirmed these reports, while the BBC has characterised the claim that this can be heard on a video as a false social media rumour.

A French prosecutor claimed that the attack "bore the hallmarks of jihadist terrorism." However, a preliminary investigation by French officials has not connected Lahouaiej-Bouhlel to any international terror groups. Amaq News Agency, an online presence said to be affiliated with the Islamic State of Iraq and the Levant (ISIL), called Lahouaiej-Bouhlel "one of the soldiers of Islamic State." It cited a "security source" which said Lahouaiej-Bouhlel "carried out the operation in response to calls to target nationals of states that are part of the coalition fighting Islamic State".

Lahouaiej-Bouhlel was not known by Tunisian authorities to have been involved in any terrorism activities on Tunisian soil. His name was not in the French database of suspected Islamic militants. According to a cousin of Lahouaiej-Bouhlel's wife, Lahouaiej-Bouhlel was not a religious person and did not attend a mosque. The Guardian noted that his lack of religious piety is typical for the French and Belgian subjects involved in terrorist rampages earlier in 2016.

French Prime Minister Manuel Valls proclaimed that Lahouaiej-Bouhlel was "probably linked to radical Islam in one way or another", and put the attack in the context of a "war" against terrorism and "extremist" Islam both outside and within France. This allegation was initially cautioned by the French Interior Minister Bernard Cazeneuve, who said "We have an individual who was not known to intelligence services for activities linked to radical Islam" and who could not confirm Lahouaiej-Bouhlel's motives were linked to radical jihadism. The next day, Cazeneuve said "It seems that he [Lahouaiej-Bouhlel] radicalized himself very quickly," early investigations had found.

Bouhlel's uncle, Sadok Bouhlel, stated his nephew was indoctrinated about two weeks prior to the attack by an Algerian member of the Islamic State group in Nice. According to authorities, Bouhlel watched many ISIS beheading videos and did in-depth research on Omar Mateen, perpetrator of the Orlando nightclub shooting.

After the attack, newspapers reported — on the authority of unspecified investigators — that evidence found on Lahouaiej-Bouhlel's cellphone showed he may have been in contact with individuals in his neighborhood, who were known to the French intelligence agencies as Islamic radicals. However, an intelligence source cautioned this "could just be a coincidence, given the neighbourhood where he lived. Everyone knows everyone there. He seems to have known people who knew Omar Diaby", a known local Islamist believed to be linked with Al-Nusra Front.

== 2016 attack in Nice and death ==
Lahouaiej-Bouhlel's mobile phone, discovered in the truck after he was shot by police, provided information to the police about his preparations. On 12 and 13 July 2016, he returned several times to the Promenade des Anglais, the site of the attack, surveying the area in the rented truck. On 12 July, he took some selfies on the Promenade, as Molins confirmed on 18 July. Lahouaiej-Bouhlel's brother said he received images of Lahouaiej-Bouhlel laughing among the holiday crowds in Nice hours before the attack.

Lahouaiej-Bouhlel was shot dead by French police officers who were attempting to force him to stop the truck. The French prosecutor said the attack "bore the hallmarks of jihadist terrorism" but that no group had claimed responsibility for the attack, and a preliminary investigation by French officials has not connected Lahouaiej-Bouhlel to any international terror groups.

However, on 16 July 2016, the Amaq News Agency called Lahouaiej-Bouhlel "a soldier of the Islamic State." It cited an "insider source", which said Lahouaiej-Bouhlel "executed the operation in response to calls to target citizens of coalition nations, which fight the Islamic State". Later that same day, ISIL's official al-Bayan radio station said Lahouaiej-Bouhlel had executed a "new, special operation using a truck" and "the crusader countries know that no matter how much they enforce their security measures and procedures, it will not stop the mujahideen from striking."

== See also ==
- List of Islamist terrorist attacks
- List of rampage killers (religious, political, or ethnic crimes)
