= Promenade des Anglais =

Beach boulevard in Nice, France

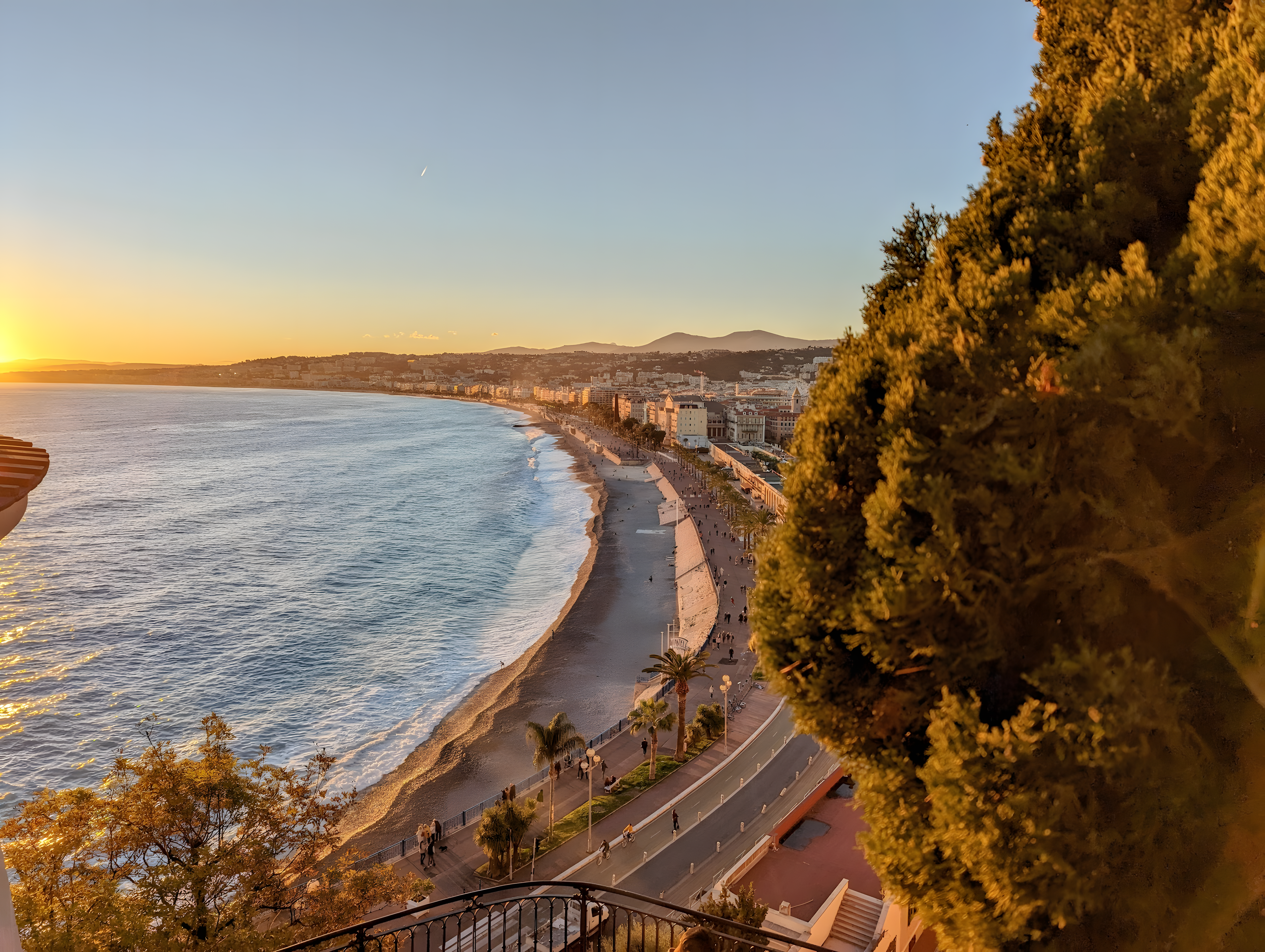
Promenade des Anglais at sunset, from the Colline du Château

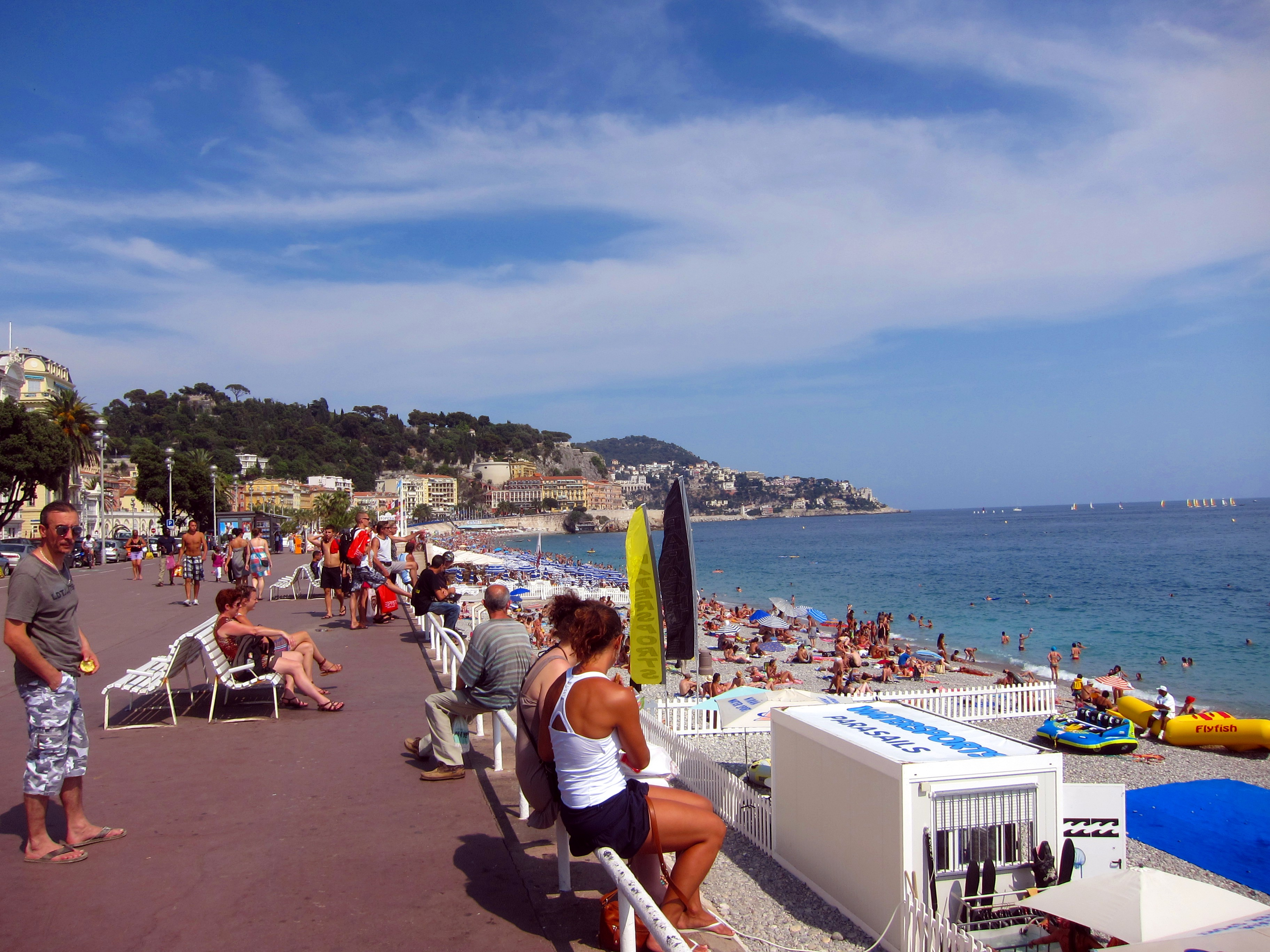
Promenade des Anglais, next to the beach

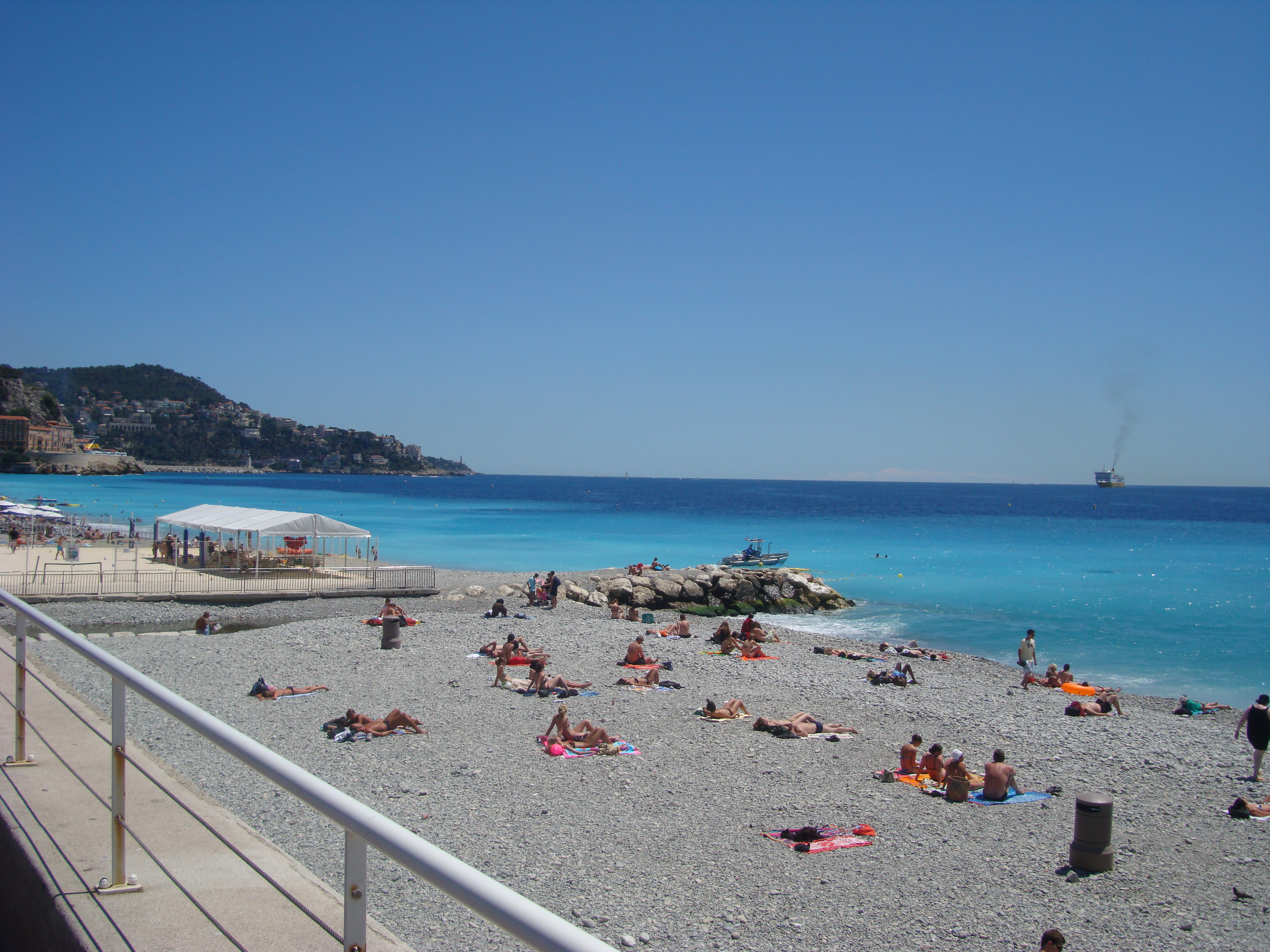
Beachfront

Promenade des Anglais (French pronunciation: [pʁɔmnad dez‿ɑ̃ɡlɛ], [- dez‿ɑ̃ɡle]; lit. "Walkway of the English"; Niçard: Passejada deis Anglés, Standard Occitan: Passejada dels Anglés) is a promenade along the Mediterranean coast of Nice, France. It extends from Nice Côte d'Azur Airport on the west to the Quai des États-Unis ("United States Quay") on the east, for a distance of approximately 7 kilometres (4.3 mi). It forms part of Route nationale 98, which runs between Toulon and Menton.

== History ==
Starting in the second half of the 18th century, the English aristocracy took to spending the winter in Nice, enjoying the panorama along the coast. In 1820, when a particularly harsh winter further north brought an influx of beggars to Nice, some of the English proposed that the beggars could work on the construction of a walkway (chemin de promenade) along the sea. It was funded by the Reverend Lewis Way and members of Holy Trinity, the Anglican church in Nice.

The city of Nice, intrigued by the prospect of a pleasant promenade, greatly increased the scope of the work. The Promenade was first called the Camin deis Anglés (the English Way) by the Niçois in their native dialect. After the annexation of Nice by France in 1860 it was rechristened La Promenade des Anglais.

The Promenade was the site of the team time trial in the 2013 Tour de France, held on 2 July 2013. It was also featured as a start and finish location of the first two stages of the 2020 Tour de France. Due to the Paris Olympics, the 2024 Tour de France concluded on the Promenade, instead of its usual location of the Champs-Élysées.

Stages 8 and 9 of the 2026 Tour de France Femmes concluded on the Promenade.

== Modern day ==
For local inhabitants, Promenade des Anglais has simply become the Promenade or, for short, La Prom. It is popular with bicyclists, baby strollers, and families, especially on Sundays. It has also become a favorite place for skateboarders and in-line skaters.

== 2016 Bastille Day attack ==
On 14 July 2016, a truck was deliberately driven at revellers celebrating Bastille Day on the Promenade. The driver, 31-year-old Mohamed Lahouaiej-Bouhlel, also shot at others before crossing the road in the vehicle to continue the assault. The vehicle was surrounded by police near the Palais de la Méditerranée, and the terrorist was shot dead. Eighty-six people were killed, and 458 were wounded.
