= Renault Midlum =

Range of trucks

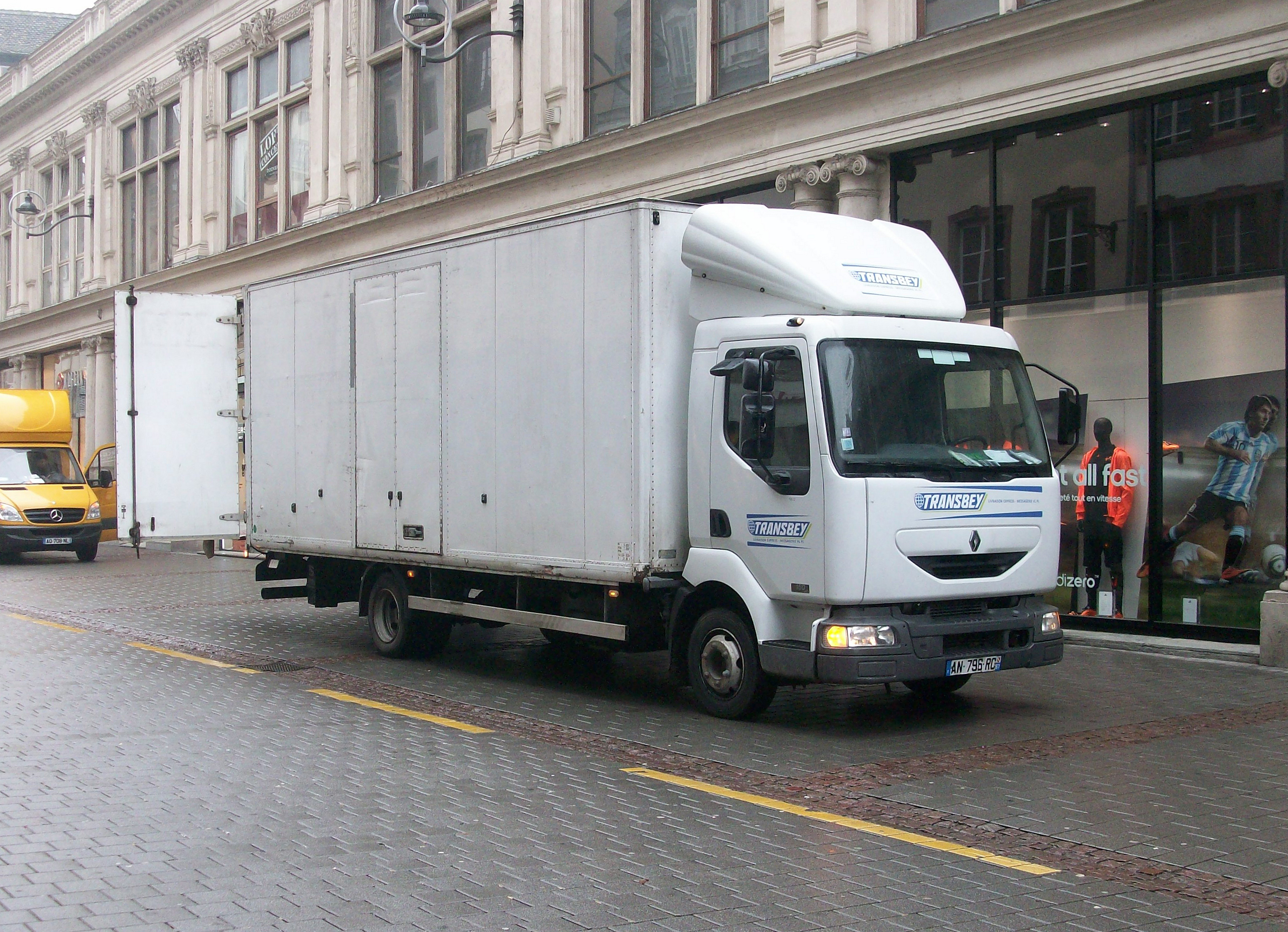
- Renault Midlum truck

Overview
- Manufacturer: Renault Trucks
- Also called: Mack Midlum (Australia); Mack Freedom (North America)
- Production: 2000–2013

Body and chassis
- Class: Truck
- Layout: Cab over

Powertrain
- Engine: 5- and 7-litre engines (2006 revision)

Dimensions
- Kerb weight: 16,535–41,888 lb (7,500–19,000 kg)

Chronology
- Predecessor: Renault Midliner
- Successor: Renault Trucks D

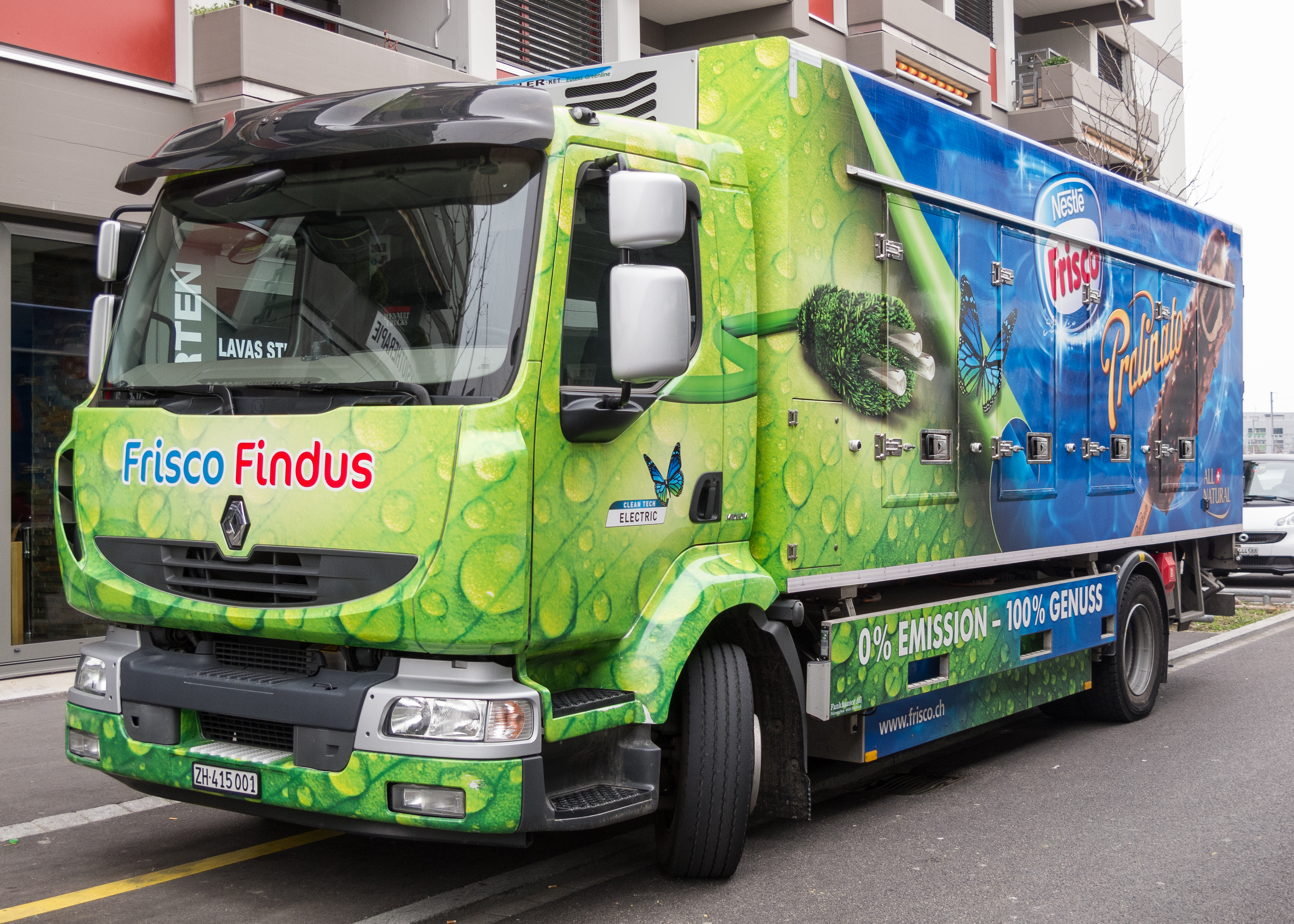
Renault Midlum Electric in Zurich

The Renault Midlum is a range of trucks with a weight between 7.5 and 19 tonnes made by Renault Trucks for urban distribution and local services.

The model was launched in 2000, and the range was revised in 2006 with new 5- and 7-litre engines. The 100,000th unit was manufactured by 2010.

In South America, the Midlum 300 DXI for Argentina, Chile and Uruguay is manufactured by the Uruguayan car and motor vehicle manufacturer Nordex S.A.

The Midlum was replaced by the Renault Trucks D in 2013.

The truck was the model of truck used in the 2016 Nice truck attack.
