= Maglia =

Maglia may refer to:

- Maglia (surname)
- Maglia (river)
