= Roya (river) =

Roya Roia, Roja
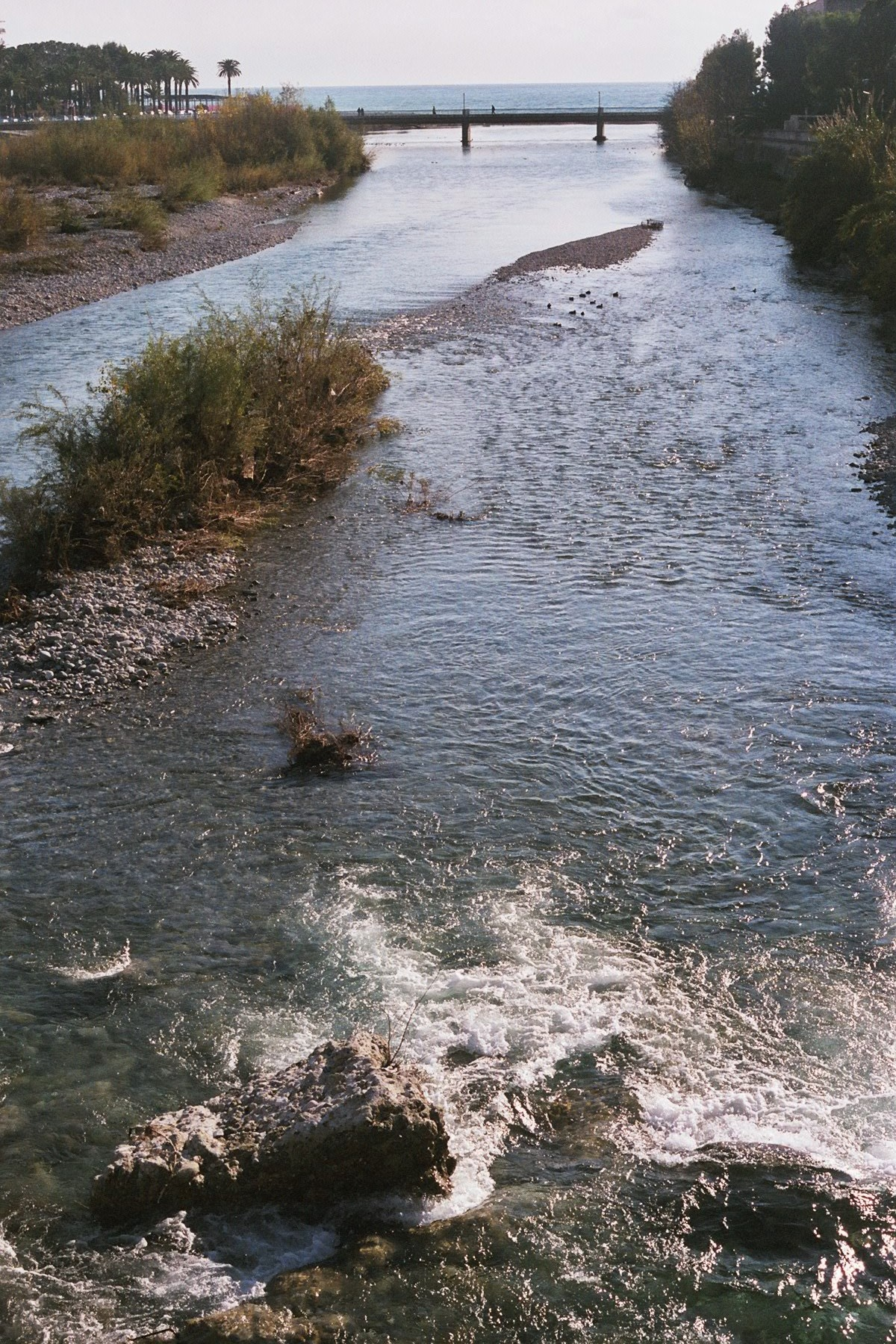
- The river at Ventimiglia

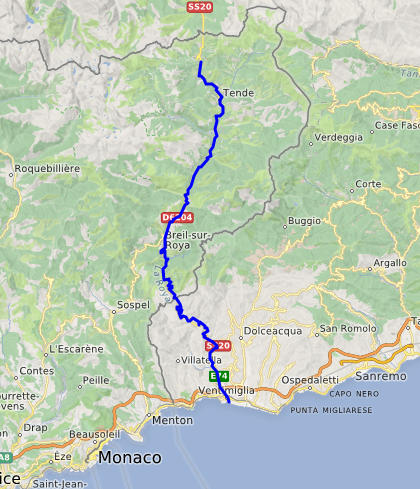

Location
- Countries: France and Italy

Physical characteristics
- Source
  - location: Colle di Tenda near Tende, France.
  - elevation: 1,908 m (6,260 ft)
- Mouth
  - location: Ligurian Sea at Ventimiglia, Italy
  - coordinates: 43°47′17″N 7°36′22″E
  - elevation: 0 m (0 ft)
- Length: 59 km (37 mi)
- Basin size: 660 km^{2} (250 mi^{2})
- Discharge
  - average: 15 m^{3}/s (530 cu ft/s)

The Roya (French, [ʁwaja]), Roia (Italian), or Ròia (Brigasc, Occitan) is a river of France and Italy, discharging into the Ligurian Sea. It is 59 km (37 mi) long, of which 40.1 km (24.9 mi) in France. Its drainage basin is about 660 km^{2} (250 sq mi), of which 601 km^{2} (232 sq mi) in France.

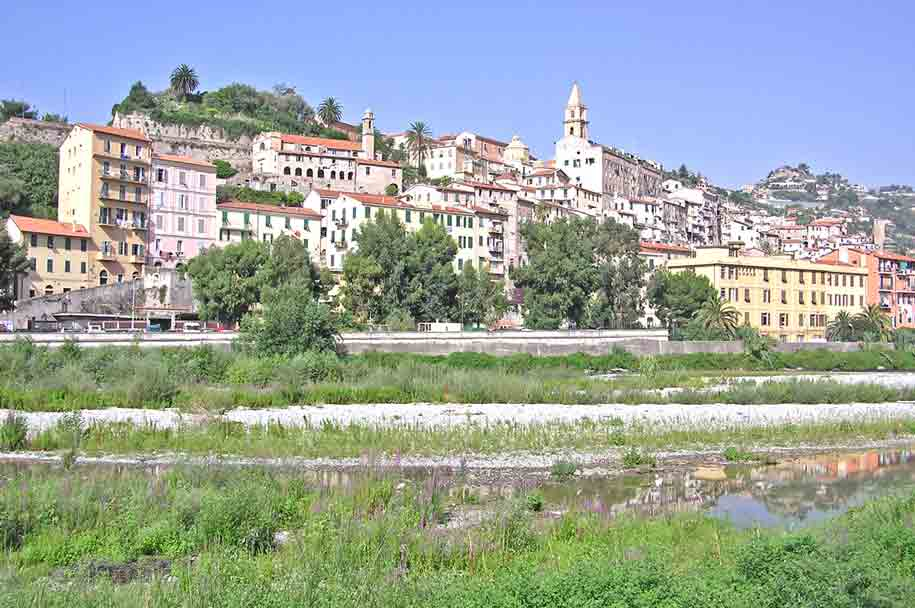
The Italian city of Ventimiglia on the French border and its river, the Roya

== River course ==
The river rises in French territory near the Col de Tende and flows through the Mercantour National Park. The river passes through the communes of Tende, Saorge, Breil-sur-Roya, La Brigue, before entering Italy in the commune of Olivetta San Michele. The remainder of its course remains within the province of Imperia and, after crossing Airole the river enters the sea at Ventimiglia.

Its main tributaries are the Lévensa, the Bévéra, the Bendola, the Réfréi and the Maglia.
