= Viareggio Diga Foranea Lighthouse =

Viareggio Diga Foranea
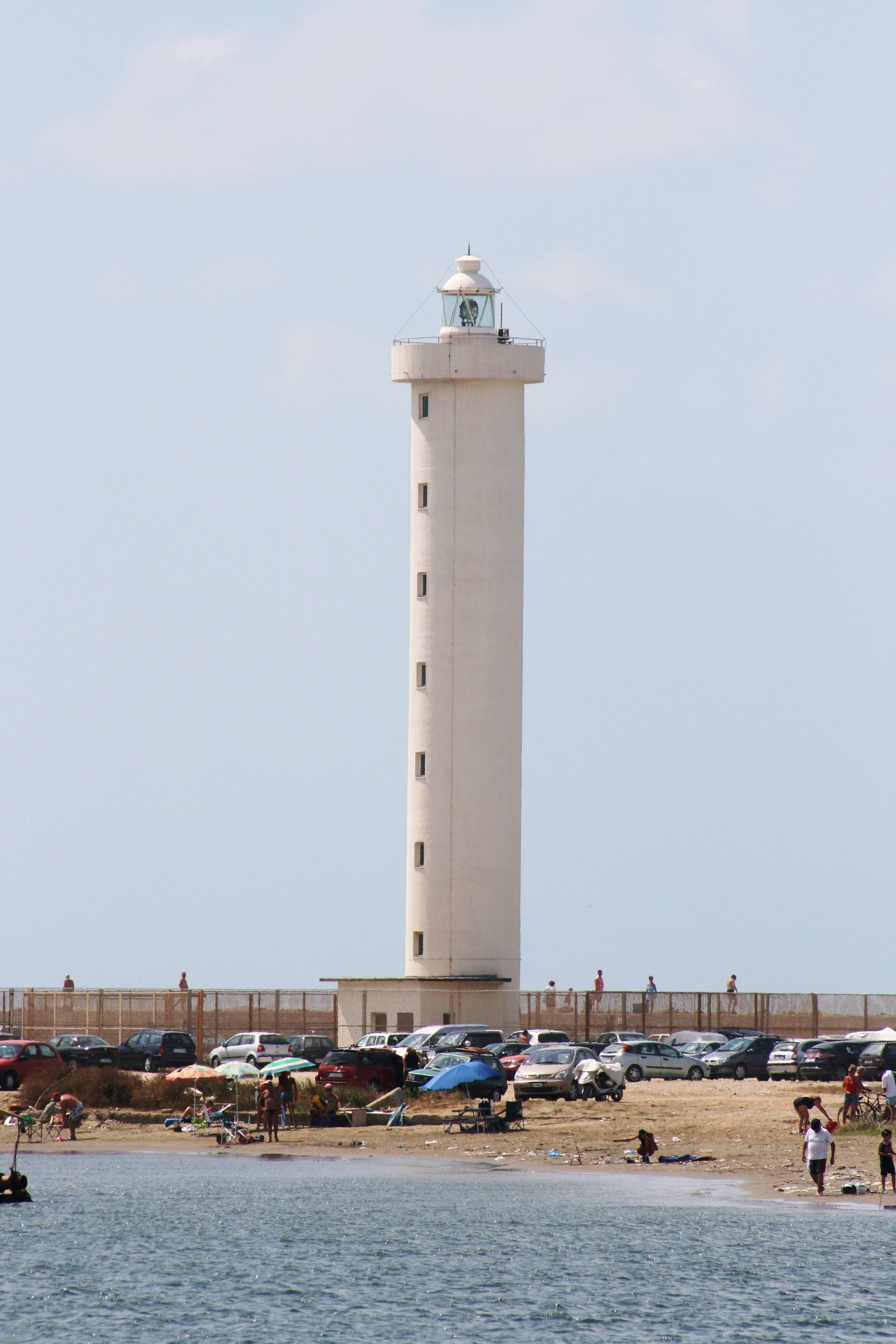
- Viareggio Lighthouse
- Location: Viareggio; Tuscany; Italy
- Coordinates: 43°51′29″N 10°14′14″E

Tower
- Constructed: 1993
- Foundation: concrete base
- Construction: concrete tower
- Height: 32 metres (105 ft)
- Shape: cylindrical tower with lantern and balcony
- Markings: white tower, balcony and lantern dome
- Power source: mains electricity
- Operator: Marina Militare

Light
- Focal height: 30 metres (98 ft)
- Lens: Type OR 250; Focal length: 125mm
- Intensity: main: AL 1000 w reserve. LABI 100 W
- Range: main: 24 nautical miles (44 km; 28 mi) reserve: 18 nautical miles (33 km; 21 mi)
- Characteristic: Fl W 5s.
- Italy no.: 1868 E.F

Viareggio Diga Foranea Lighthouse (Italian: Faro di Viareggio diga foranea) is an active lighthouse, located at halfway the breakwater of the dock of Viareggio on the Ligurian Sea.

== Description ==
The lighthouse, built in 1993, consists of a concrete cylindrical tower, 32 metres (105 ft) high, painted white as the balcony and the lantern dome. On the south side of the tower are seven windows lined up in order to light the internal stairs, another window is that of the clock room.

The light is positioned at 30 metres (98 ft) above sea level and emits one white flash in a 5 seconds period, visible up to a distance of 24 nautical miles (44 km; 28 mi). The lighthouse is completely automated and managed by the Marina Militare with the identification code number 1868 E.F.

== See also ==
- List of lighthouses in Italy
