= Maglia (river) =

- Location within France Location within Provence-Alpes-Côte d'Azur

Location
- Country: France

Physical characteristics
- Mouth
  - location: Roya
  - coordinates: 43°57′10″N 7°31′13″E
- Length: 9 km (6 mi)

Basin features
- Progression: Roya→ Ligurian Sea

The Maglia is a river that flows through the Alpes-Maritimes department of southeastern France. It is 9.0 km (5.6 mi) long. It flows into the Roya near Breil-sur-Roya. Its canyon is known to be one of the most beautiful in France, and it is a popular place for canyoning.
