= Bendola =

River in France

- Location within France Location within Provence-Alpes-Côte d'Azur

Location
- Country: France

Physical characteristics
- Source
  - location: Ligurian Alps
- Mouth
  - location: Roya
  - coordinates: 43°58′54″N 7°32′46″E
- Length: 16 km (10 mi)

Basin features
- Progression: Roya→ Ligurian Sea

The Bendola is a river that flows through the Alpes-Maritimes department of southeastern France. It is 15.9 km (9.9 mi) long. It is a left tributary of the Roya. Its source is in the Ligurian Alps, east of Saorge, near the border with Italy. It discharges into the river Roya near Saorge.
