= Réfréi =

- Location within France Location within Provence-Alpes-Côte d'Azur

Location
- Country: France

Physical characteristics
- Mouth
  - location: Roya
  - coordinates: 44°5′22″N 7°35′48″E
- Length: 13 kilometres (8 mi)

Basin features
- Progression: Roya→ Ligurian Sea

The Réfréi is a river that flows through the Alpes-Maritimes department of southeastern France. It is 12.9 km (8.0 mi) long. It flows into the Roya in Tende.
