= Lévensa =

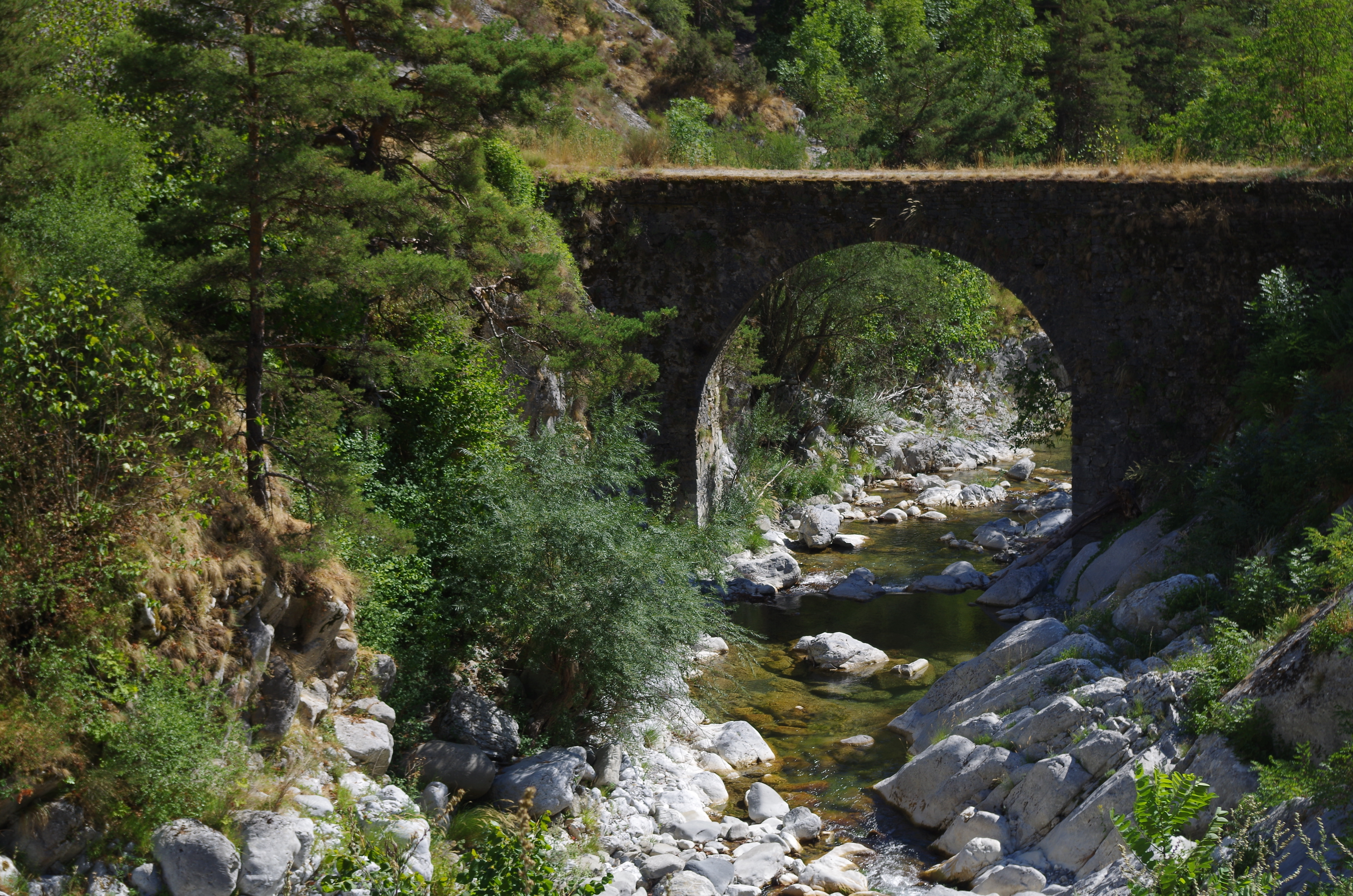

- Location within France Location within Provence-Alpes-Côte d'Azur

Location
- Country: France

Physical characteristics
- Mouth
  - location: Roya
  - coordinates: 44°3′24″N 7°35′17″E
- Length: 12 km (7.5 mi)

Basin features
- Progression: Roya→ Ligurian Sea

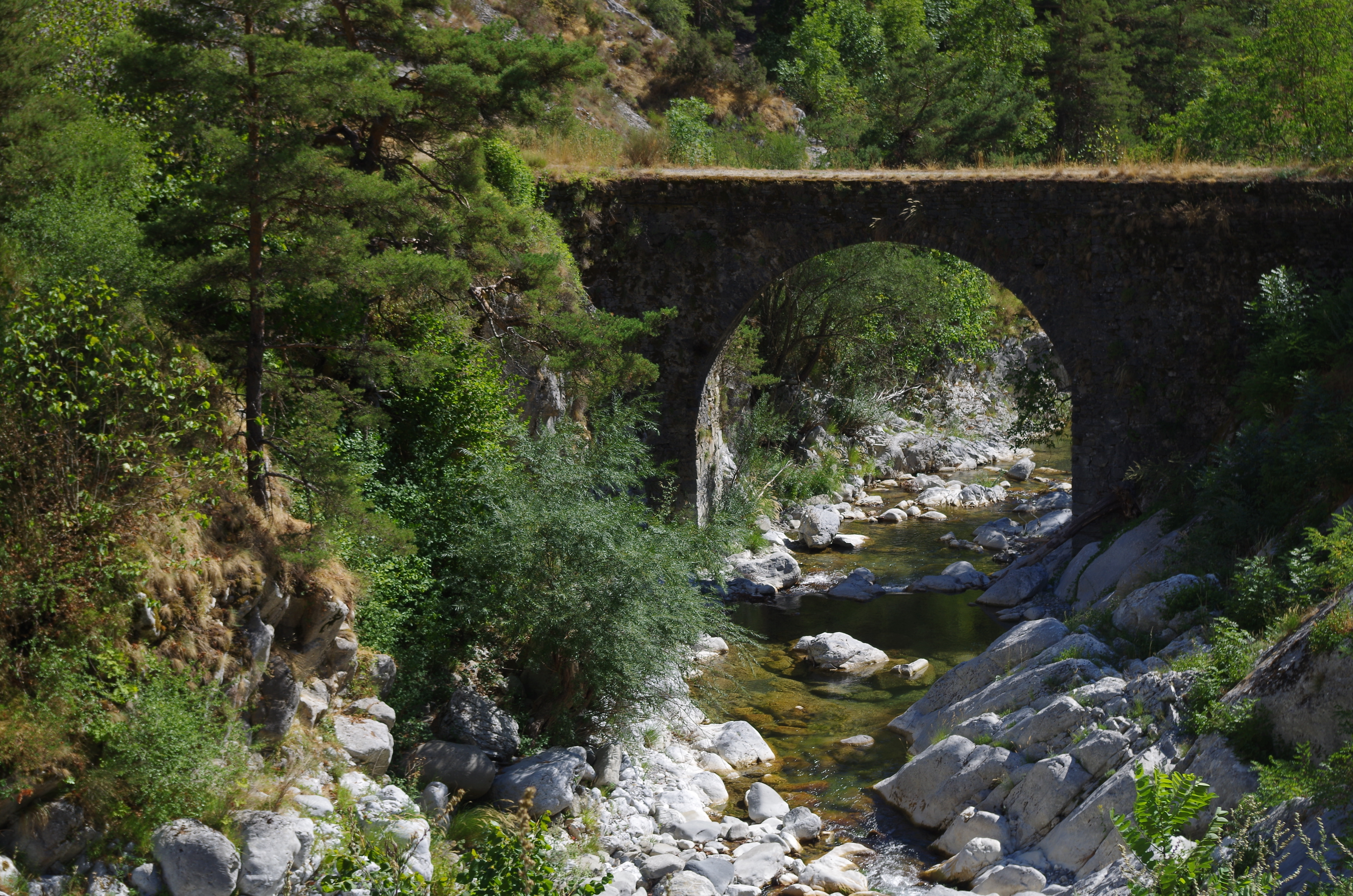
Lévensa under the bridge of the old lime kiln

The Lévensa is a mountain river that flows through the Alpes-Maritimes department of Provence-Alpes-Côte d'Azur in southeastern France. It is 12.0 km (7.5 mi) long. It is a left tributary of the Roya, which it joins near Tende.
