= Maglia (surname) =

Maglia is a surname. Notable people with the surname include:

- Gianluca Maglia (born 1988), Italian swimmer
- Veronica Maglia (born 1989), Swiss footballer
- Enrico Maglia (born 1940), Italian politician
