= Breil-sur-Roya =

Commune in Provence-Alpes-Côte d'Azur, France

- Commune
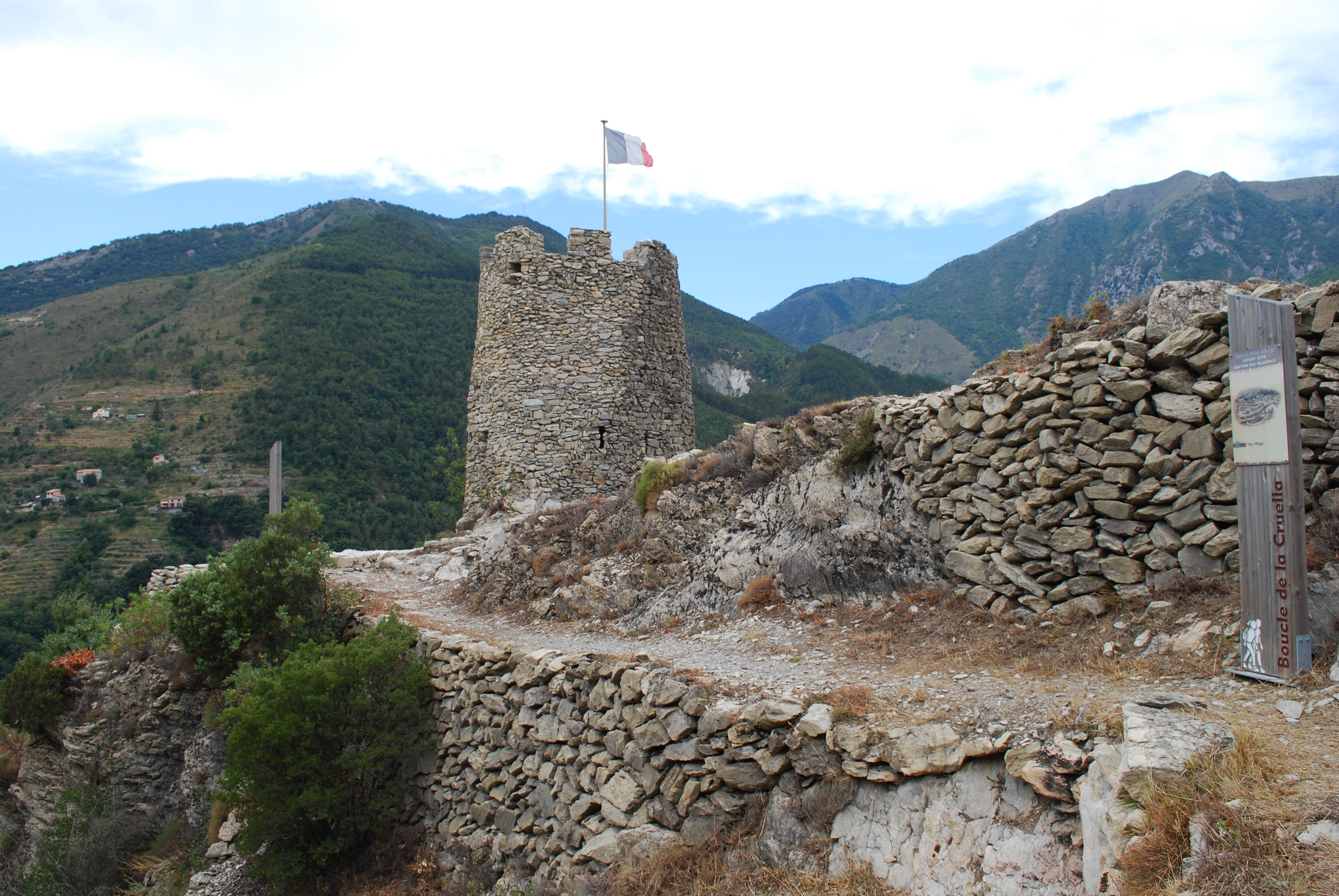
- The tower of Cruella, in Breil-sur-Roya

- Coat of arms
- Location of Breil-sur-Roya
- Location within France Location within Provence-Alpes-Côte d'Azur
- Coordinates: 43°56′17″N 7°30′54″E
- Country: France
- Region: Provence-Alpes-Côte d'Azur
- Department: Alpes-Maritimes
- Arrondissement: Nice
- Canton: Contes
- Intercommunality: CA Riviera Française

Government
  - Mayor (2026–32): Sébastien Olharan
- Area^{1}: 81.31 km^{2} (31.39 sq mi)
- Elevation: 310 m (1,020 ft)
- Highest elevation: 2,080 m (6,820 ft)
- Lowest elevation: 151 m (495 ft)
- Population (2023): 2,377
  - Density: 29.23/km^{2} (75.72/sq mi)
- Demonym: Breillois
- Time zone: UTC+01:00 (CET)
  - Summer (DST): UTC+02:00 (CEST)
- INSEE/Postal code: 06023 /06540
- ^{1} French Land Register data, which excludes lakes, ponds, glaciers > 1 km^{2} (0.386 sq mi or 247 acres) and river estuaries.

Breil-sur-Roya (French pronunciation: [bʁɛj syʁ ʁwaja], literally Breil on Roya; Italian: Breglio sul Roia or simply Breglio; Ligurian: Breggio; Occitan: Brelh de Ròia) is a commune in the Alpes-Maritimes department in southeastern France.

== Population ==
Historical population

Year	Pop.	±% p.a.
1793	932	—
1800	1,419	+6.19%
1806	1,511	+1.05%
1822	1,969	+1.67%
1838	2,392	+1.22%
1848	2,637	+0.98%
1858	2,458	−0.70%
1861	2,706	+3.26%
1866	2,709	+0.02%
1872	2,595	−0.71%
1876	2,576	−0.18%
1881	2,538	−0.30%
1886	2,565	+0.21%
1891	2,696	+1.00%
1896	2,668	−0.21%
1901	2,728	+0.45%
1906	2,645	−0.62%

Year	Pop.	±% p.a.
1911	2,804	+1.17%
1921	5,136	+6.24%
1926	2,899	−10.81%
1931	2,666	−1.66%
1936	2,562	−0.79%
1946	1,321	−6.41%
1954	2,029	+5.51%
1962	1,994	−0.22%
1968	2,148	+1.25%
1975	2,089	−0.40%
1982	2,095	+0.04%
1990	2,058	−0.22%
1999	2,028	−0.16%
2007	2,115	+0.53%
2012	2,444	+2.93%
2017	2,158	−2.46%
2023	2,377	+1.62%

Source: EHESS and INSEE (1968-2023)

== Geography ==
Breil-sur-Roya as its name says is located on the scenic and fast moving river Roya within the river's gorge and along the adjacent escarpments. The area features river rafting, swimming, and hiking.

Breil-sur-Roya is one of the towns on the route of the SNCF Train des Merveilles which runs between Nice and Cuneo in Italy. Trains operate seven times each direction as of 2020 and can be taken from Nice (1 + 1/2 hour) for area touring. The line operated by Italy (FS, the Italian State Railroad) from Ventimiglia joints the SNCF line from Nice at Breil-sur-Roya.

== Tourism ==
The GR52, part of the French Grande Randonnée walking trail network links the town to Gorges de Saorge and Vallon de Zouayne.

Breil-sur-Roya is particularly known for trout fishing. The Roya river runs through town and is open to trout anglers from March to September. Part of the trout run is reserved for fly-fishing. Trout anglers share the river with rafters, another popular local sport.

== Flood of 2020 ==
The river Roya violently flooded in October 2020. Major damage occurred to both commercial buildings, to residential homes, and to roads all the way downstream to Ventimiglia, Italy, on the seacoast.

== Twin towns — sister cities ==
Breil-sur-Roya is twinned with:

- Borgo San Dalmazzo, Italy (2000)
- Aléria, France (2013)

== See also ==
- Communes of the Alpes-Maritimes department
