= Ligurian Sea =

Arm of the Mediterranean Sea north of Corsica

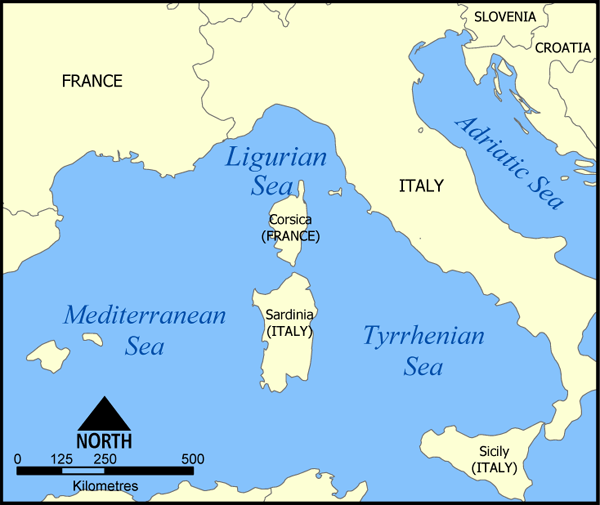
The Ligurian Sea

The Ligurian Sea: in red the border according to International Hydrographic Organization, in blue the border according to Istituto Idrografico della Marina

The Ligurian Sea (Note: Italian: Mar Ligure; French: Mer Ligurienne; Ligurian: Mâ Ligure; Corsican: Mari Liguru; Occitan: Mar Ligure) is an arm of the Mediterranean Sea. The sea is thought to have been named after the ancient Ligures people.

== Geography ==
The sea borders the Italian Riviera in Liguria and the island of Corsica. In the east, the sea borders the Tyrrhenian Sea, while in the west it borders the Mediterranean Sea proper. Genoa is the most prominent city in the area. The northwest coast is noted for its scenery and climate.

The Gulf of Genoa is its northernmost part. The port of Genoa is on its rocky coast. It reaches a maximum depth of more than 2,800 m (9,300 ft) northwest of Corsica.

According to a 1983 study, since 1977 a series of experimental analyses on sea-level variations at Genoa and Imperia highlighted "the existence of a seiche wave with a mean period of 5.8 hours", whose reasons weren't yet explained at that time. The Ligurian Sea was modeled as a rectangular semi-closed basin with a longitudinal length of 40 km (25 mi) and a transversal one of 10 km (6.2 mi), in an average constant depth of 2,000 m (6,600 ft; 1,100 fathoms).

=== Extent ===
The International Hydrographic Organization defines the limits of the Ligurian Sea as follows:

On the Southwest. A line joining Cape Corse (Cape Grosso, 9°23′E) the Northern point of Corsica to the frontier between France and Italy (7°31′E).

On the Southeast. A line joining Cape Corse with Tinetto Island (44°01′N 9°51′E) and thence through Tino and Palmaria Islands to San Pietro Point (44°03′N 9°50′E) on the Coast of Italy.

On the North The Ligurian Coast of Italy.

== Flowings ==
The Ligurian Sea is traversed by the Modified Atlantic Water (MAW) on its surface and by the Levantine Intermediate Water in depth. It is also brushed by the two main currents which surround the Corsica island: the Western Corsica Current and the Tyrrenian current that reaches the Corsica Channel.

== Conservation ==
In order to provide protection for the numerous cetacean (whales and dolphins; porpoises are not found in this part of the Mediterranean Sea) species in the Ligurian Sea the bordering countries established the sea as a SPAMI in 1999. The International Ligurian Sea Cetacean Sanctuary now covers 84,000 km^{2} (32,000 sq mi) covering territorial waters as well as high sea.

== Image gallery ==
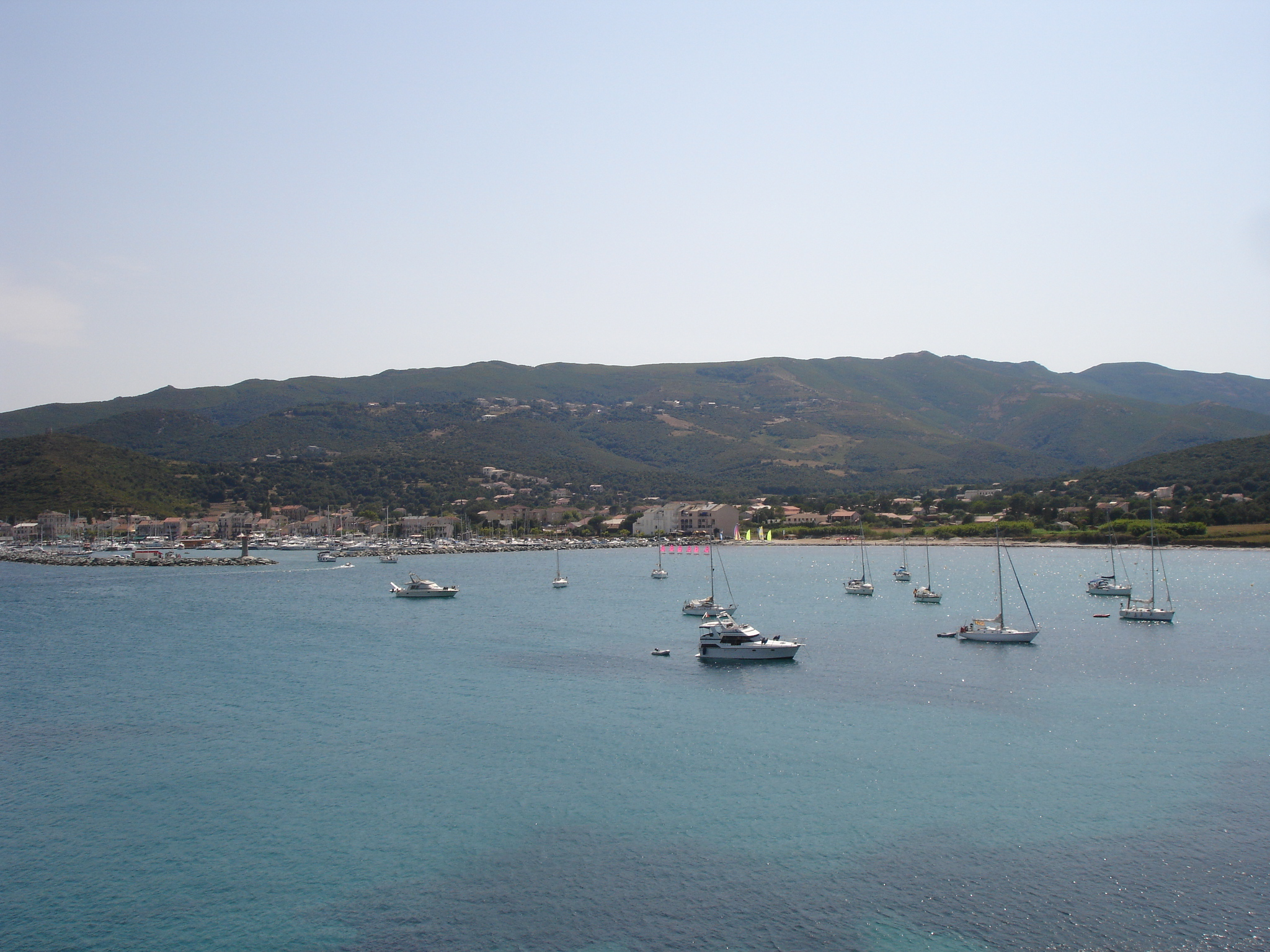
Rogliano

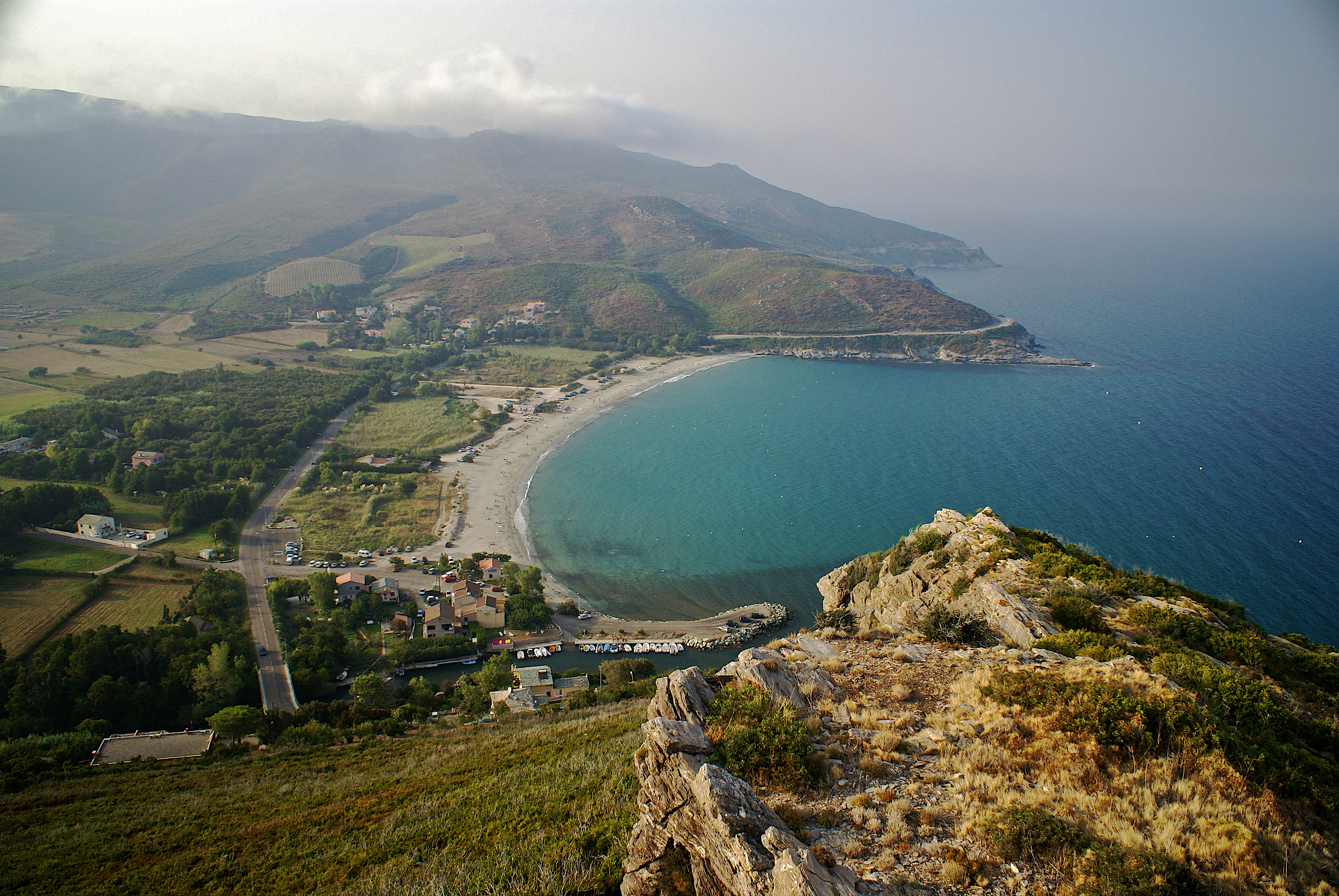
Pietracorbara

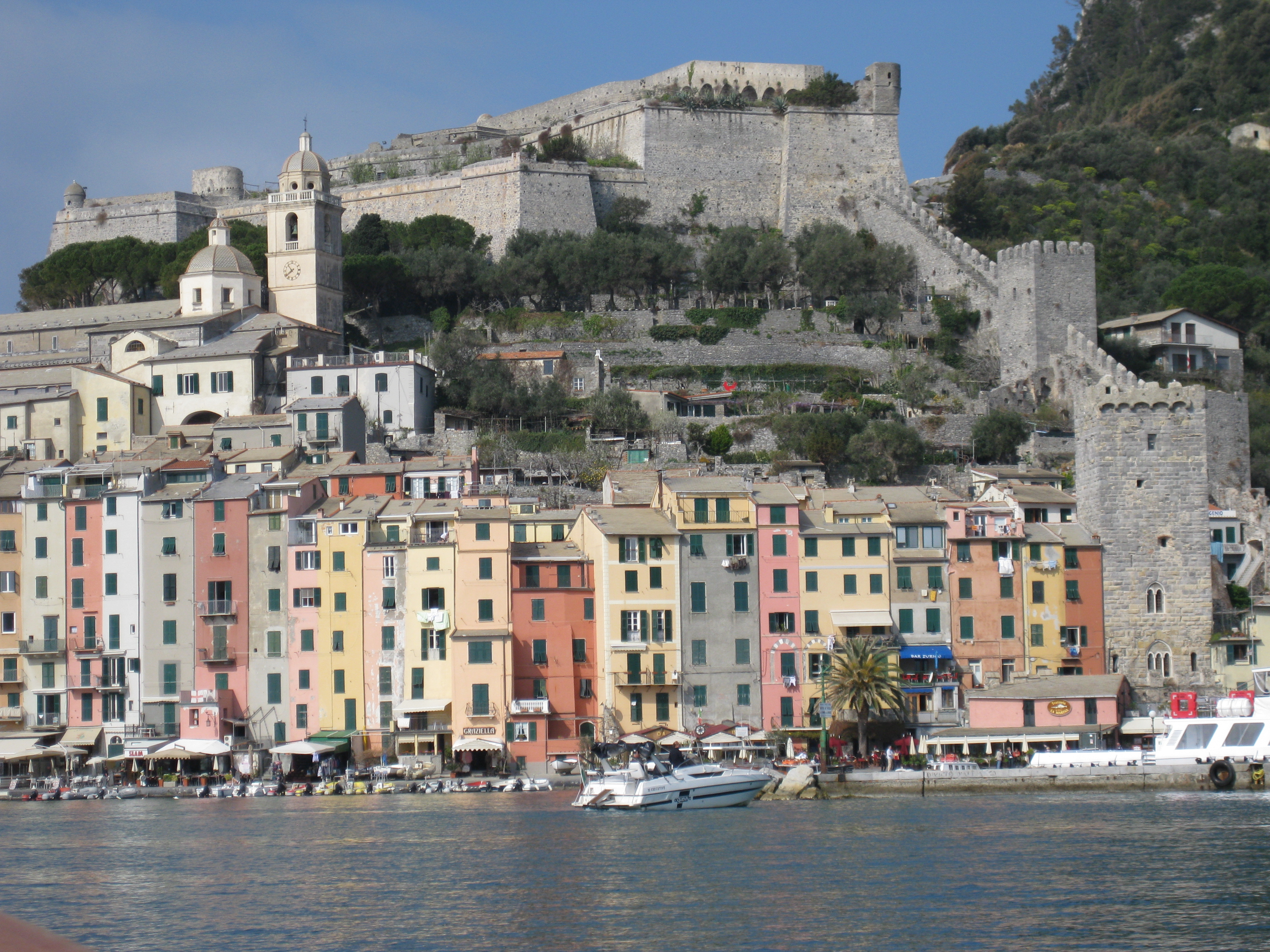
Portovenere

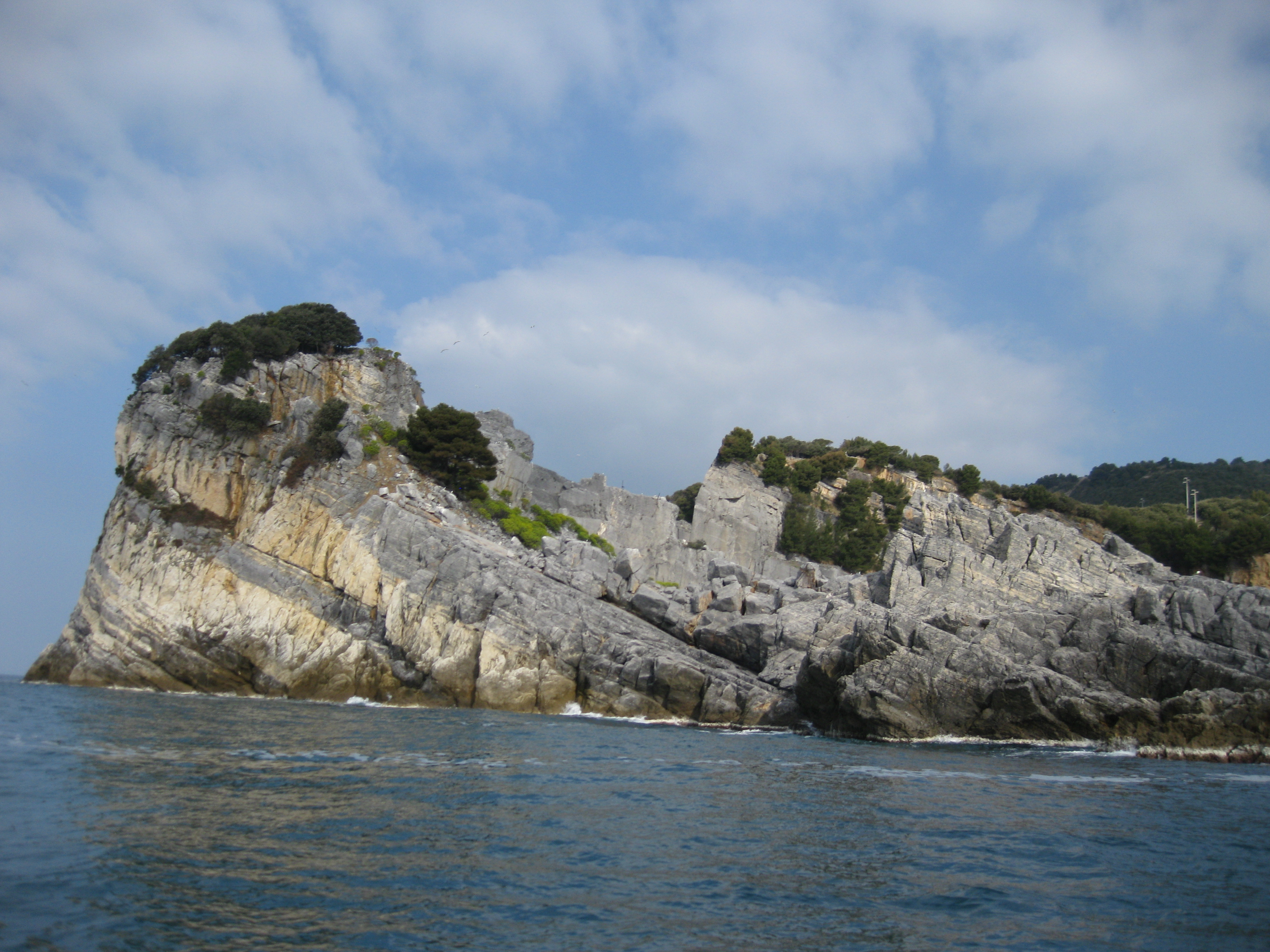
Palmaria

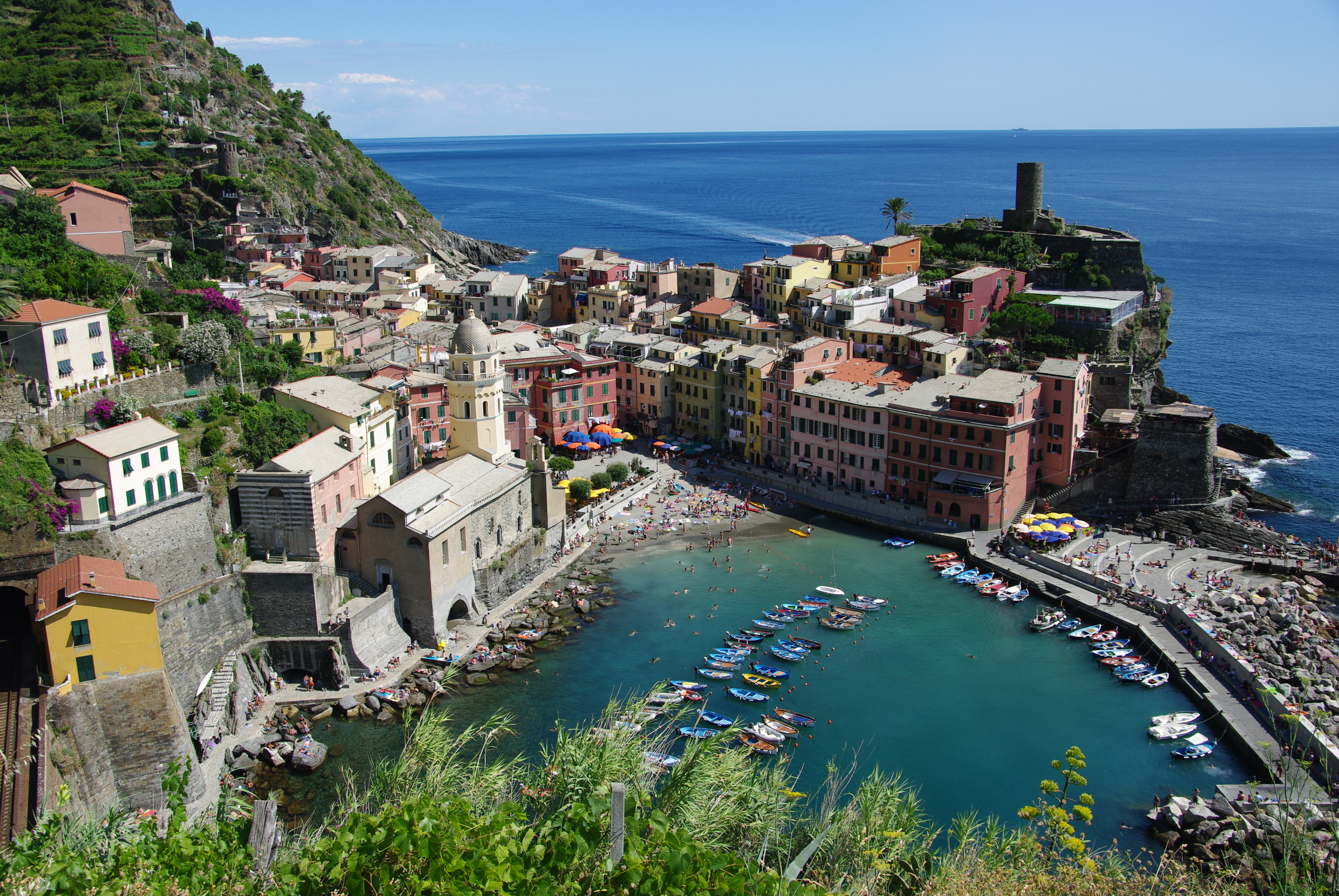
Vernazza

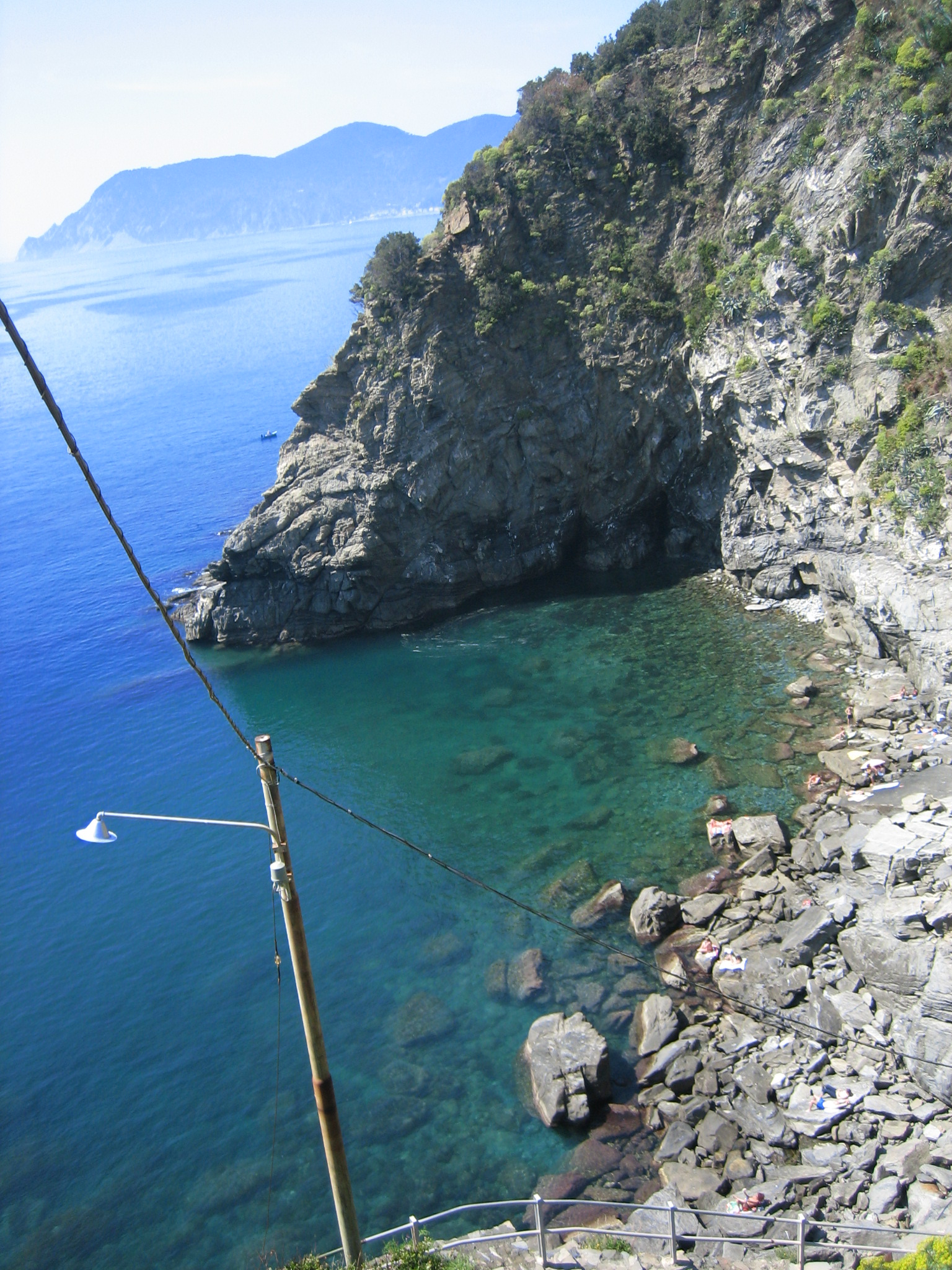
Corniglia

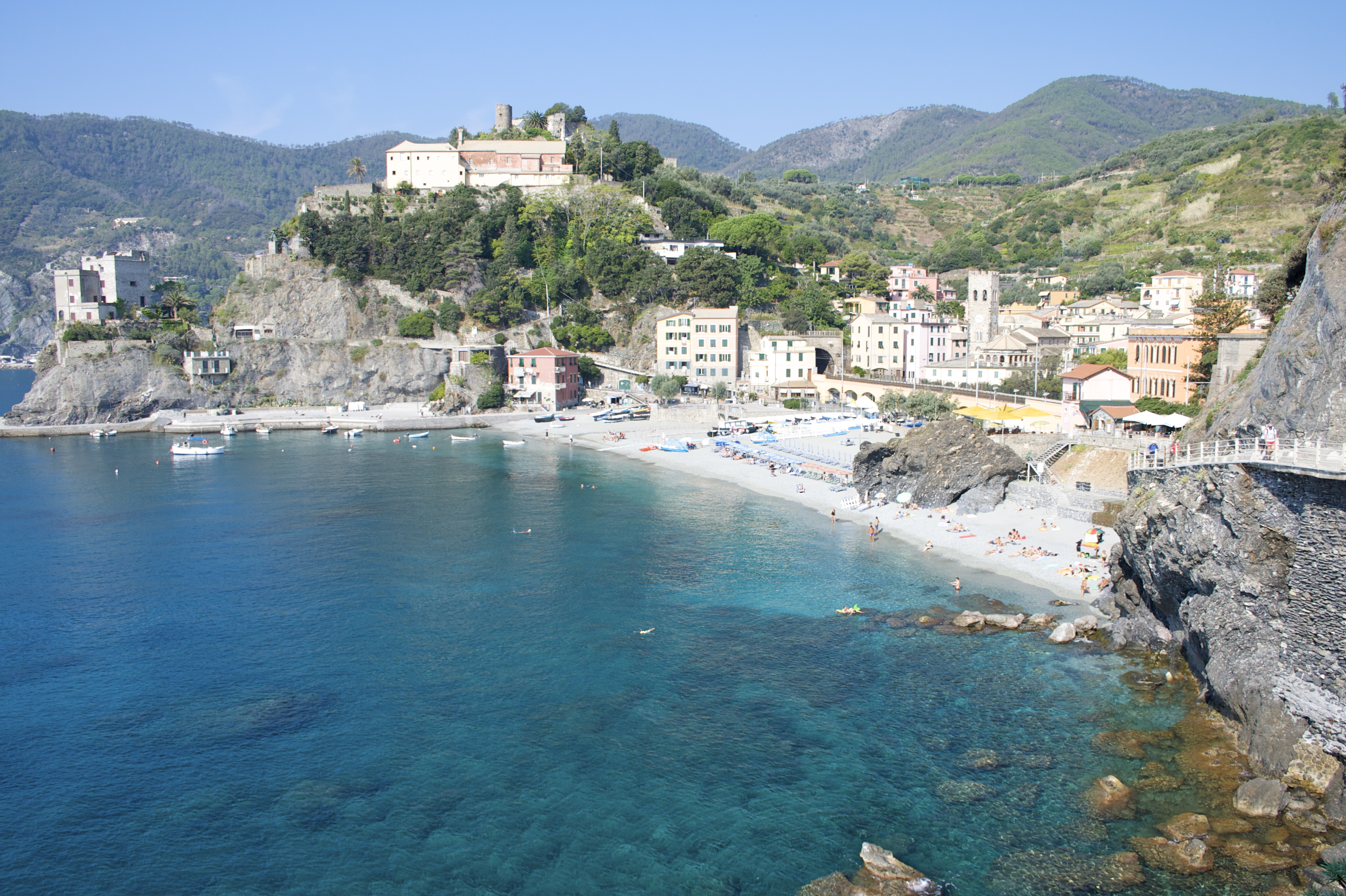
Monterosso al Mare

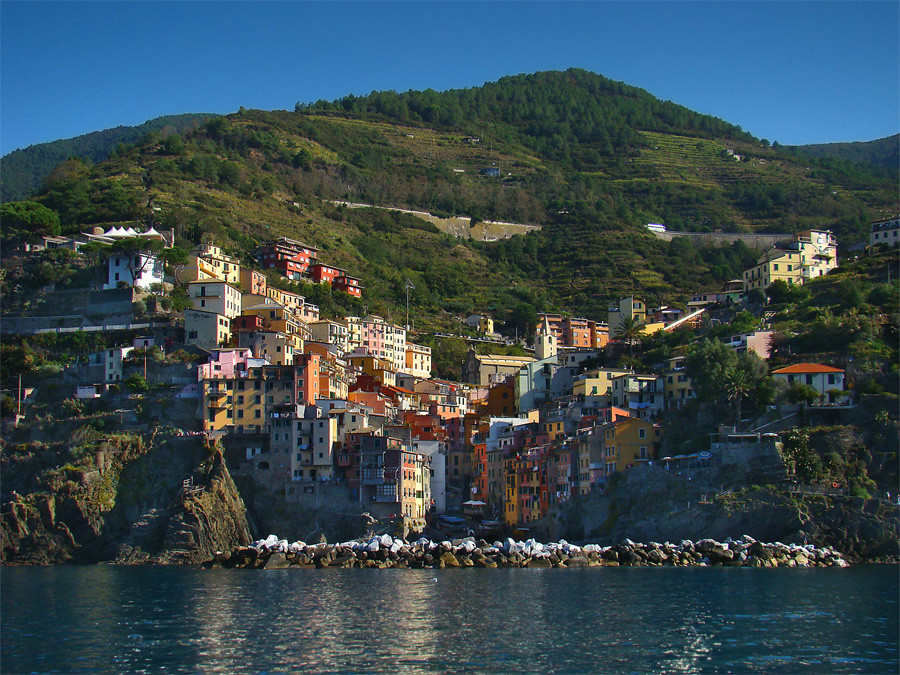
Riomaggiore

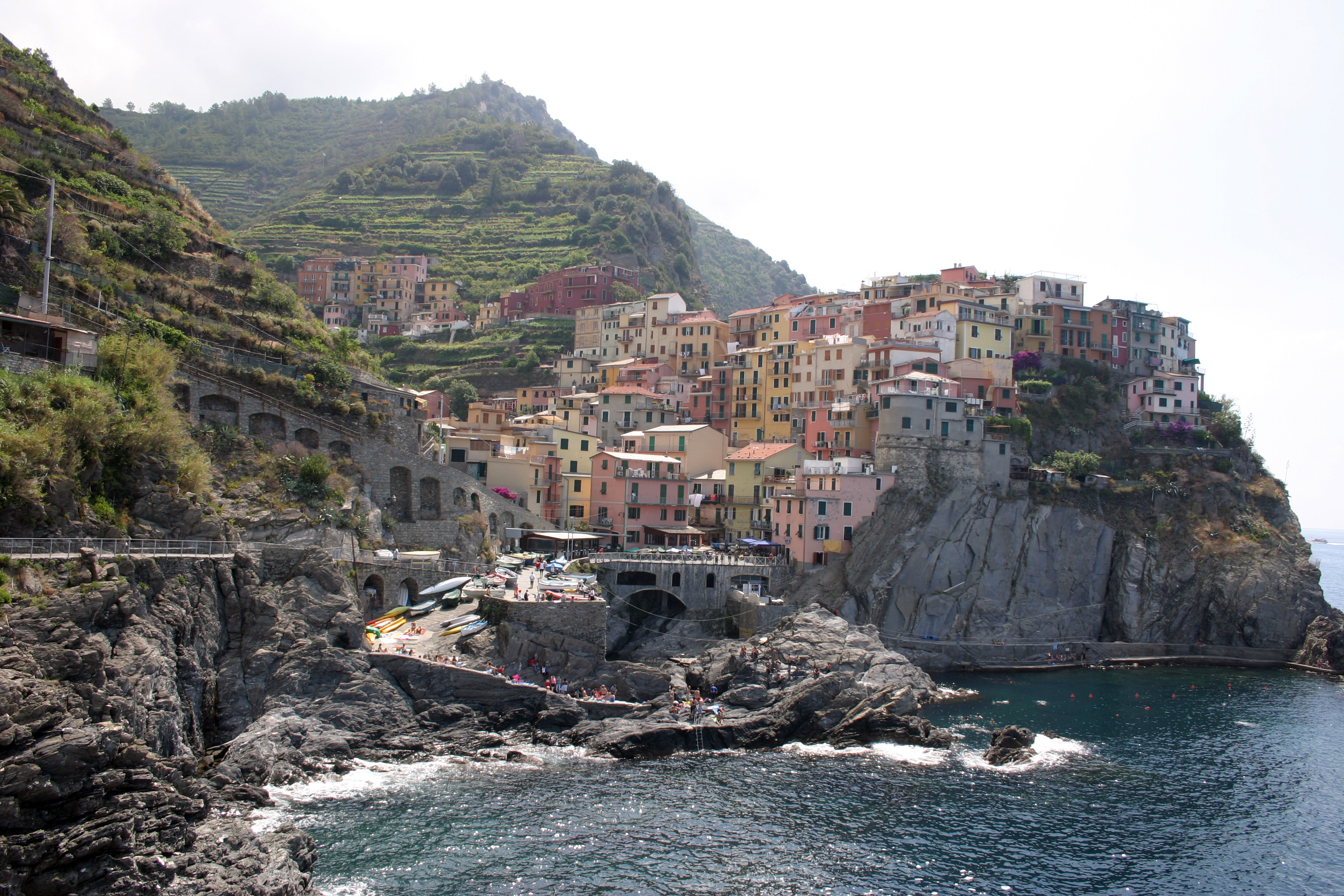
Manarola

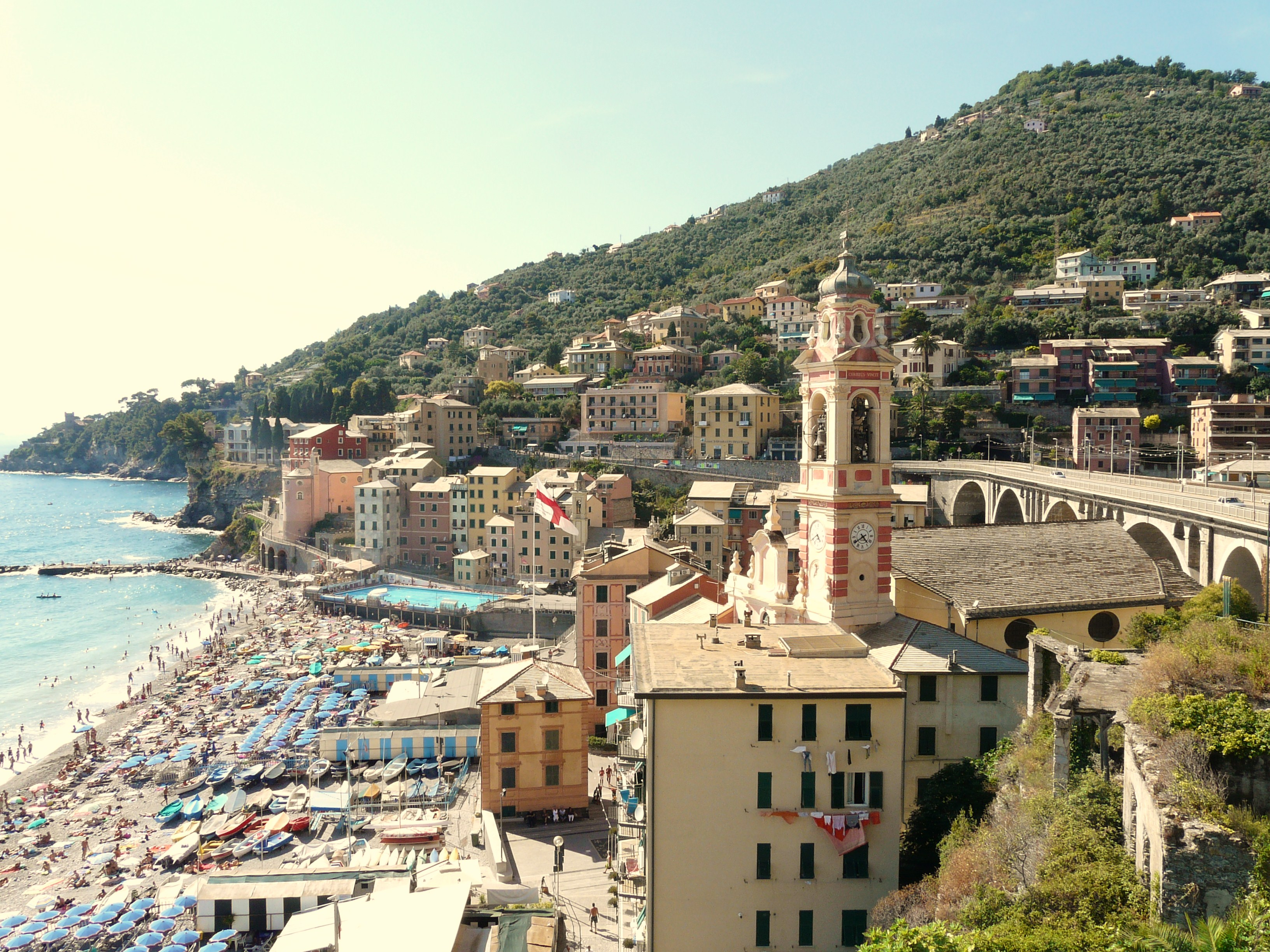
Sori

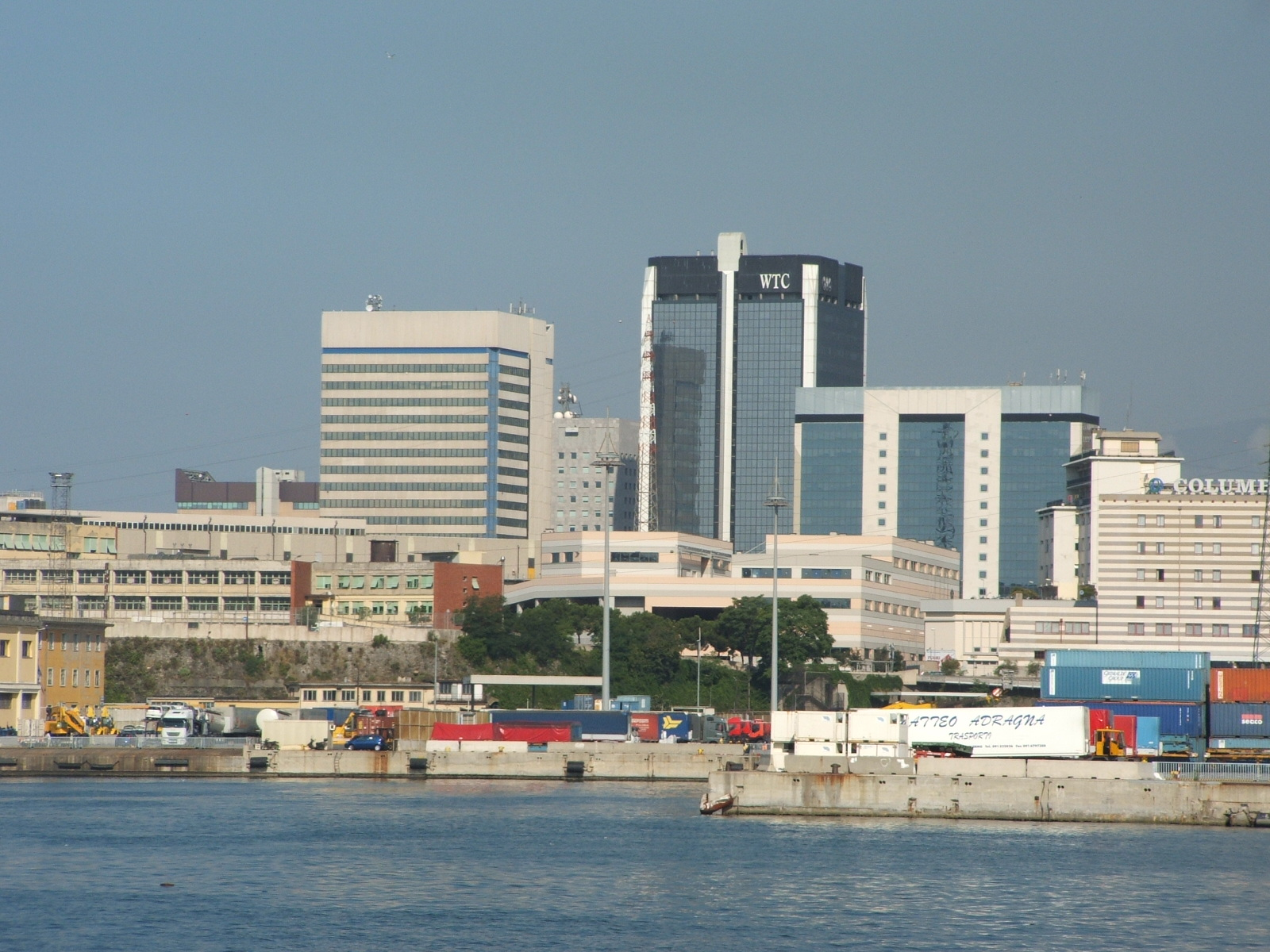
Genoa

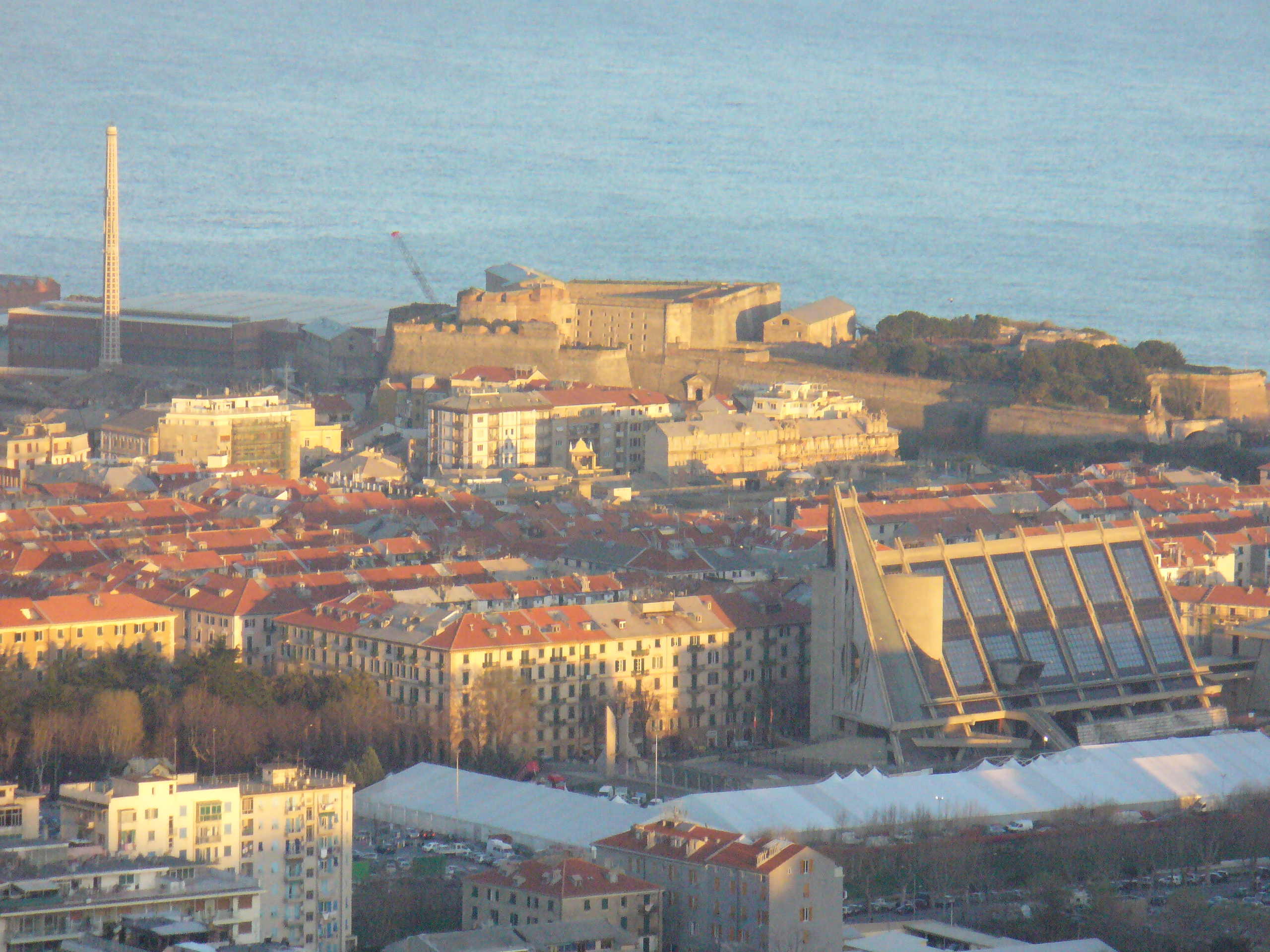
Savona

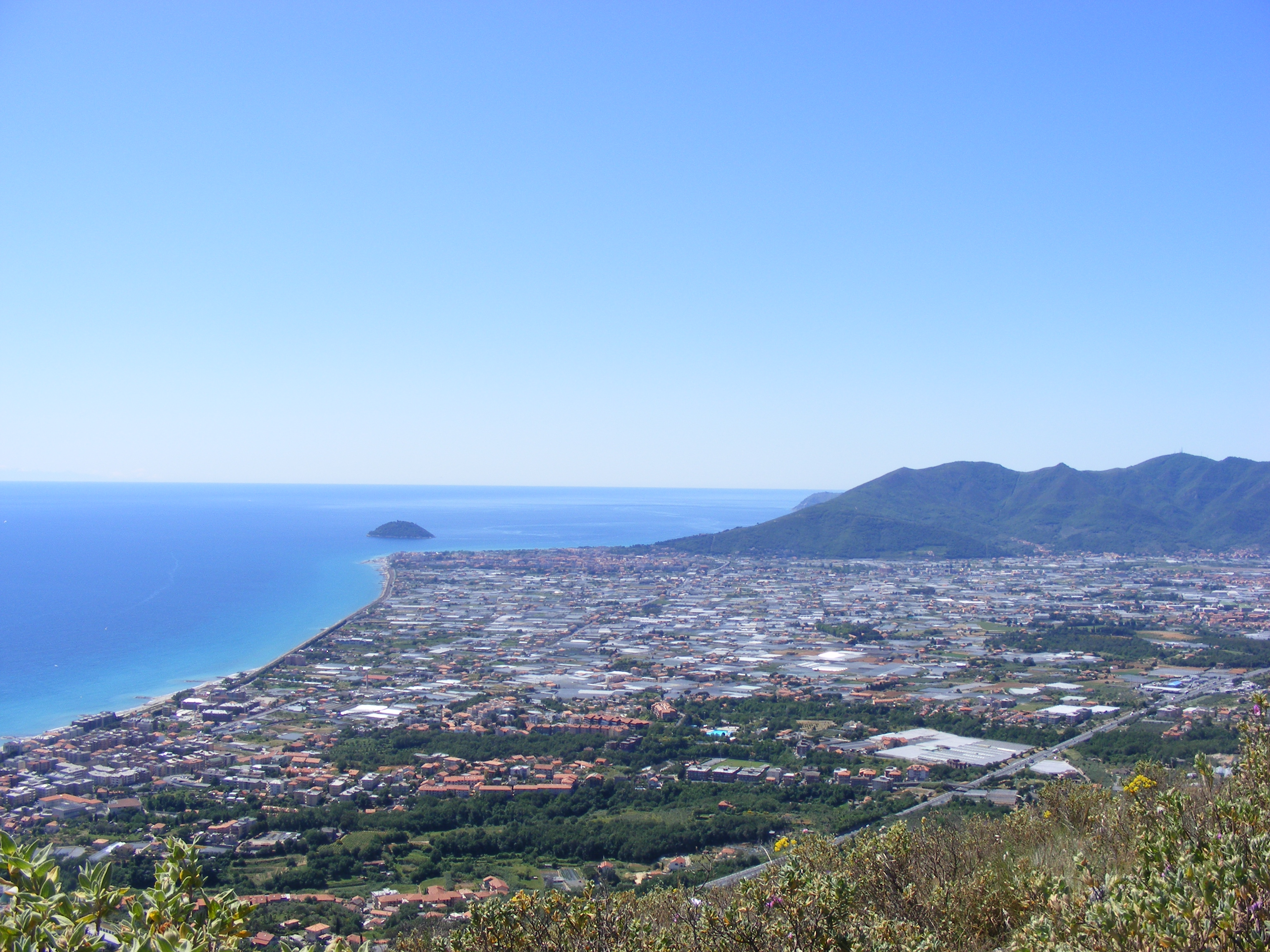
Ceriale

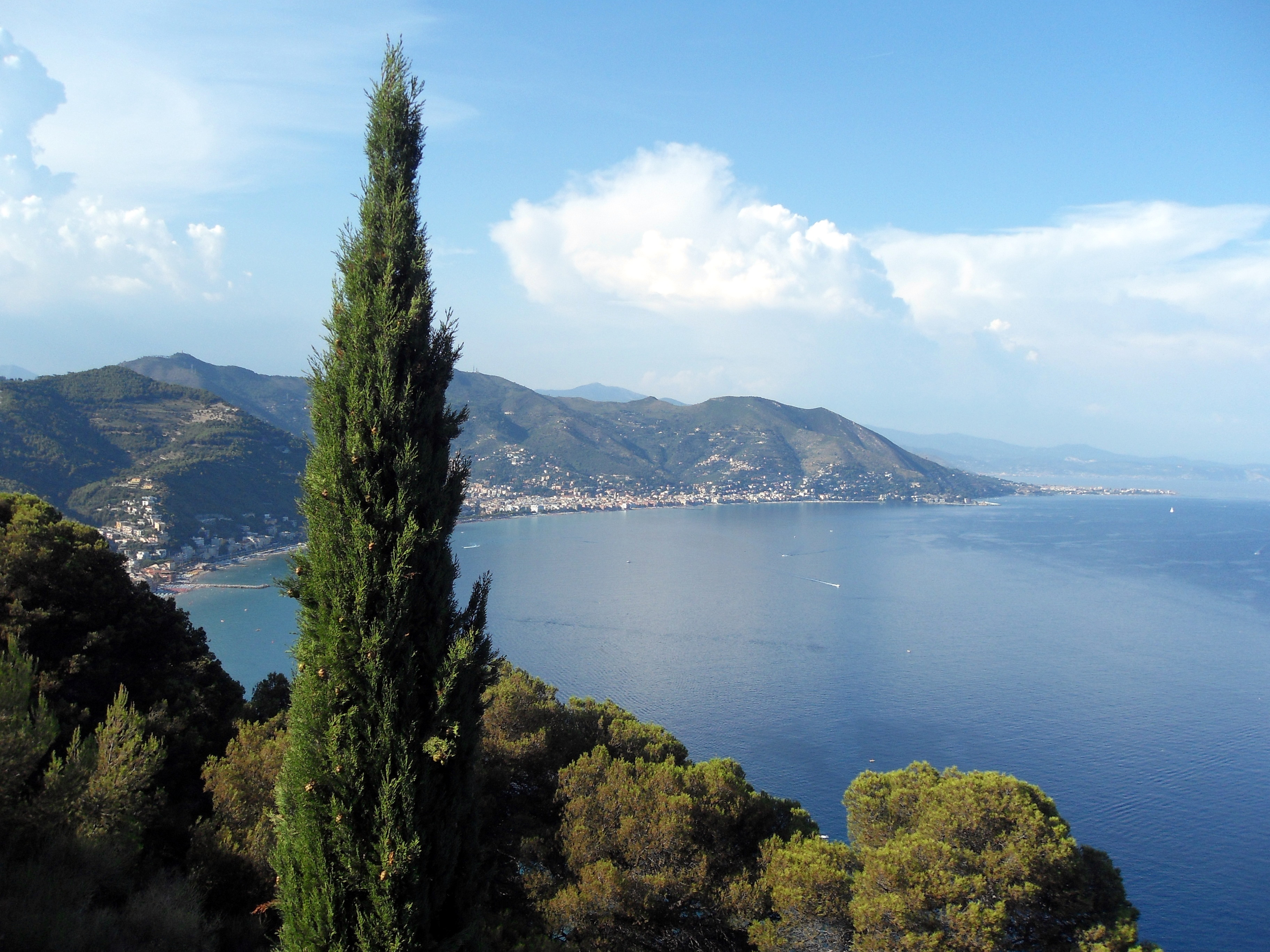
Alassio

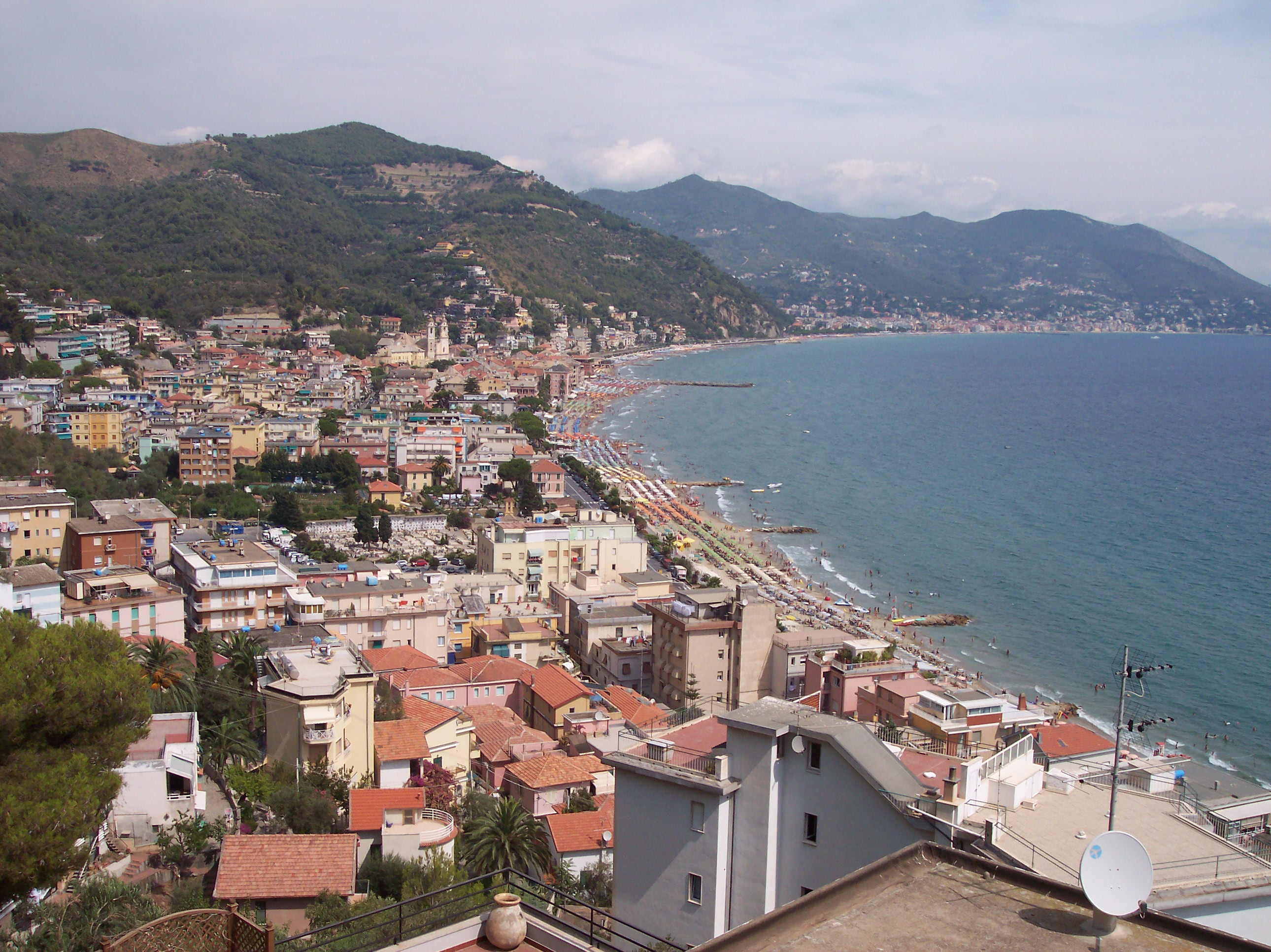
Laigueglia

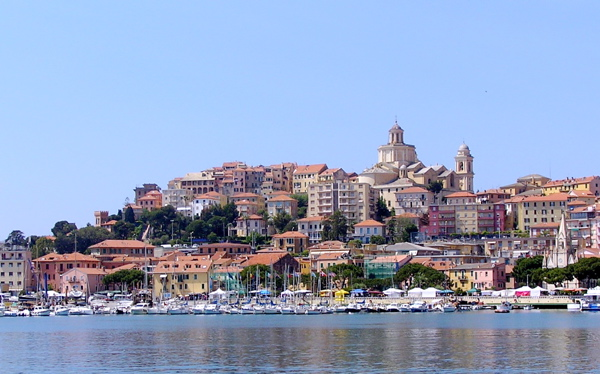
Imperia

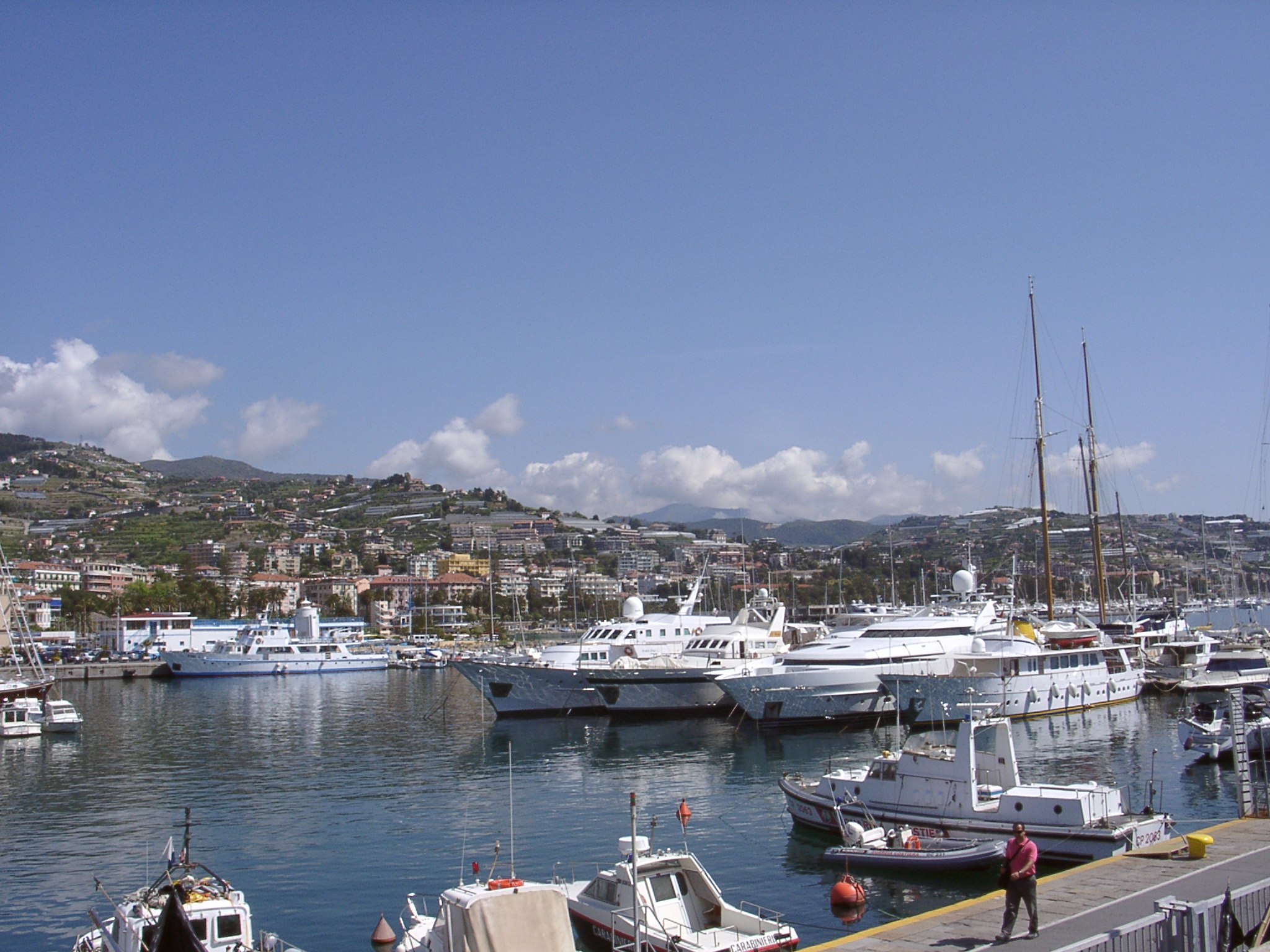
Sanremo

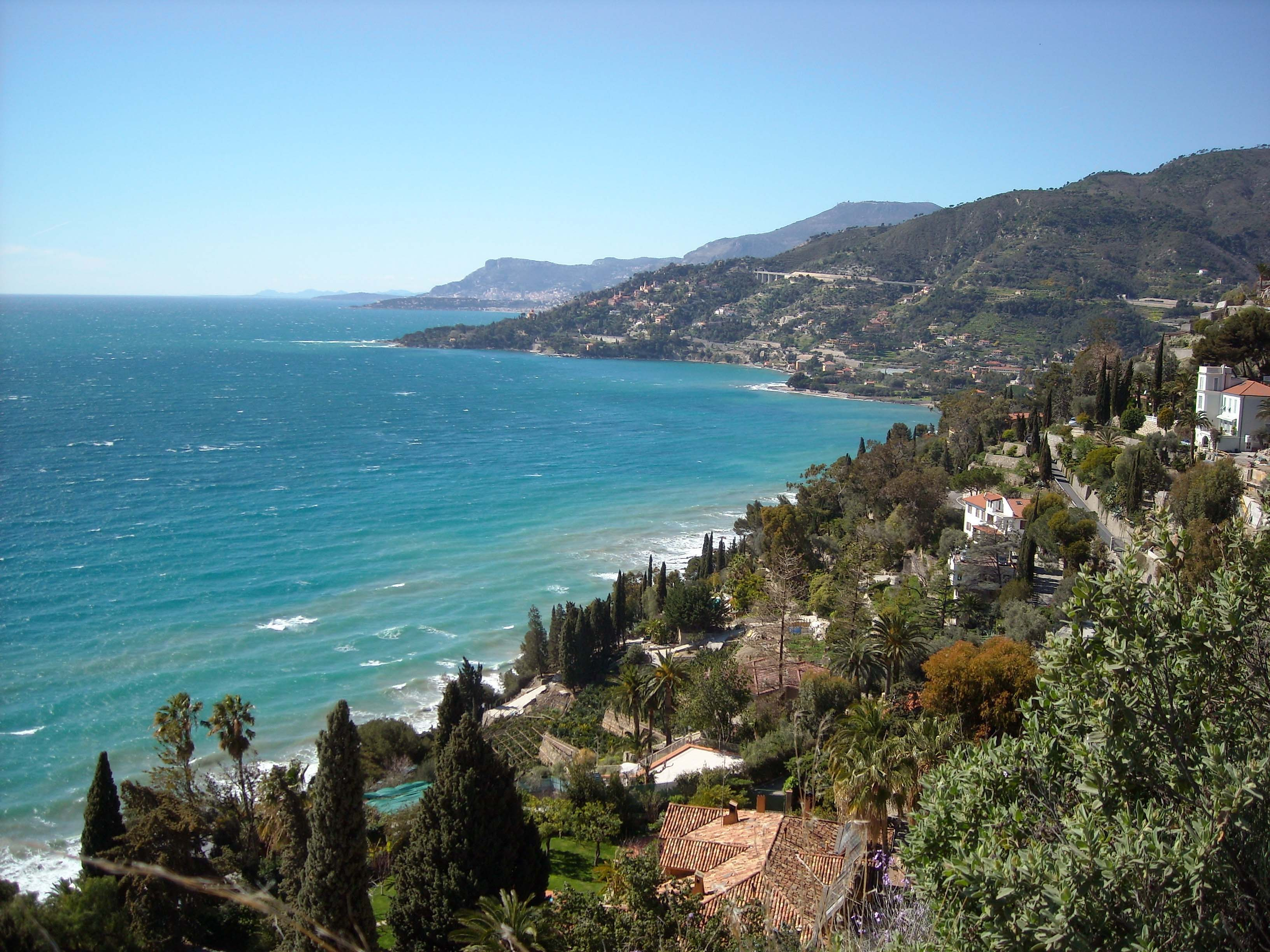
Ventimiglia
