= Statue of René Goscinny (Drap) =

Monument in Drap, France

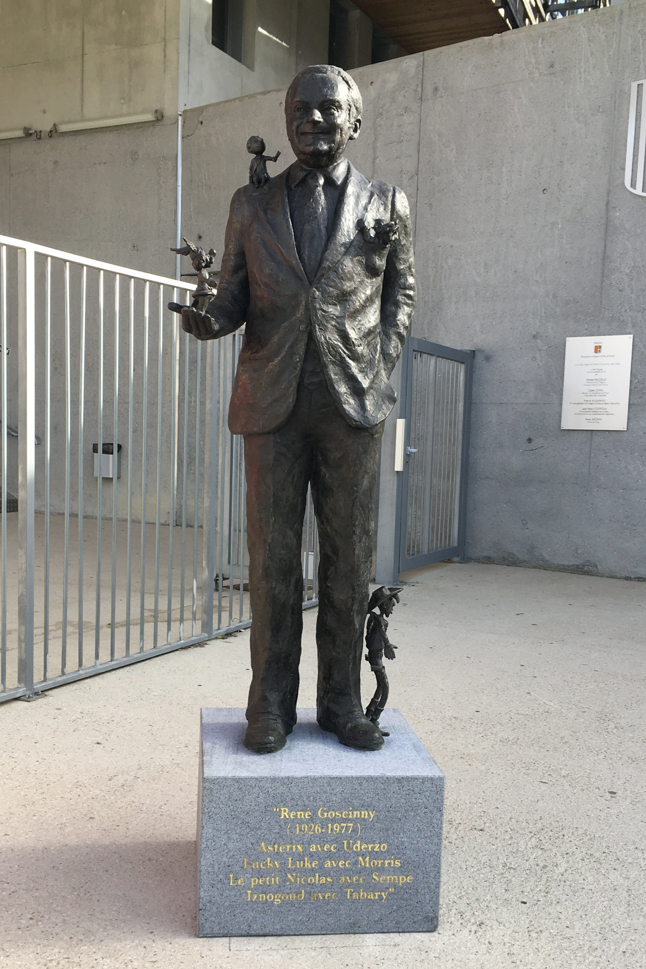
- The monument in 2017.
- Interactive map of Statue of René Goscinny
- Location: 500 Route des Croves, Drap, Provence-Alps-Azure Coast, France
- Coordinates: 43°45′53.11″N 07°20′22.87″E
- Designer: Sébastien Langloÿs
- Type: Statue
- Material: Bronze
- Opening date: 2017
- Dedicated to: René Goscinny

The statue of René Goscinny (French pronunciation: [ʁəne ɡɔsini], Polish pronunciation: [ɡɔɕˈt͡ɕin.nɘ̟]; French: Statue de René Goscinny) is a monument in the commune of Drap within the region of Provence-Alps-Azure Coast in France. It is placed in front of the René Goscinny High School on 500 Route des Croves. The monument has a form of a bronze statue of René Goscinny (1926–1977), a 20th-century cartoonist and comic writer. It was designed by Sébastien Langloÿs, and unveiled in 2017.

== History ==
The monument was dedicated to René Goscinny (1926–1977), a 20th-century cartoonist and comic writer. It was designed by Sébastien Langloÿs, and unveiled in 2017, in front of the René Goscinny High School in Drap. The school was constructed on a parcel donated by René Goscinny's daughter, Anne Goscinny, and opened in 2012.

On 23 January 2020, a replica of the statue, placed on a larger stone pedestal, was unveiled in the 16th arrondissement of Paris, next to the former residence of René Goscinny at 54 Boulainvilliers Street.

== Characteristics ==
The monument is placed in front of the René Goscinny High School on 500 Route des Croves. The monument consists of the life-sized bronze statue of René Goscinny (1926–1977), a 20th-century cartoonist and comic writer, wearing a suit. It also includes small statues of characters from Goscinny's famous works. This includes Little Nicolas, a primary school student, sitting on Goscinny's right shoulder; Asterix, a Gaul warrior, standing on Goscinny's hand; Iznogoud, a nobleman, pocking out from the front pocket of his suit; and Lucky Luke, a cowboy standing next to Goscinny's left leg.

The statue is placed on a pedestal which features the inscription noting four of his works depicted in the sculpture, Asterix, Lucky Luke, Little Nicolas, and Iznogoud, together with the credits to their respective illustrators, Albert Uderzo, Morris, Jean-Jacques Sempé, and Jean Tabary, respectably. The inscription reads:

French inscription

René Goscinny
(1926–1977)
Astérix avec Uderzo
Lucky Luke avec Morris
Le petit Nicolas avec Sempé
Iznogoud avec Tabary

Translation:
English translation

René Goscinny
(1926–1977)
Asterix with Uderzo
Lucky Luke with Morris
Little Nicolas with Sempé
Iznogoud with Tabary

== See also ==
- Bust of René Goscinny, another monument dedicated to Goscinny, located in Warsaw, Poland
- Statue of René Goscinny (Paris), another monument dedicated to Goscinny, located in Paris, France
