= Châteauneuf-Villevieille =

Commune in Provence-Alpes-Côte d'Azur, France

- Commune
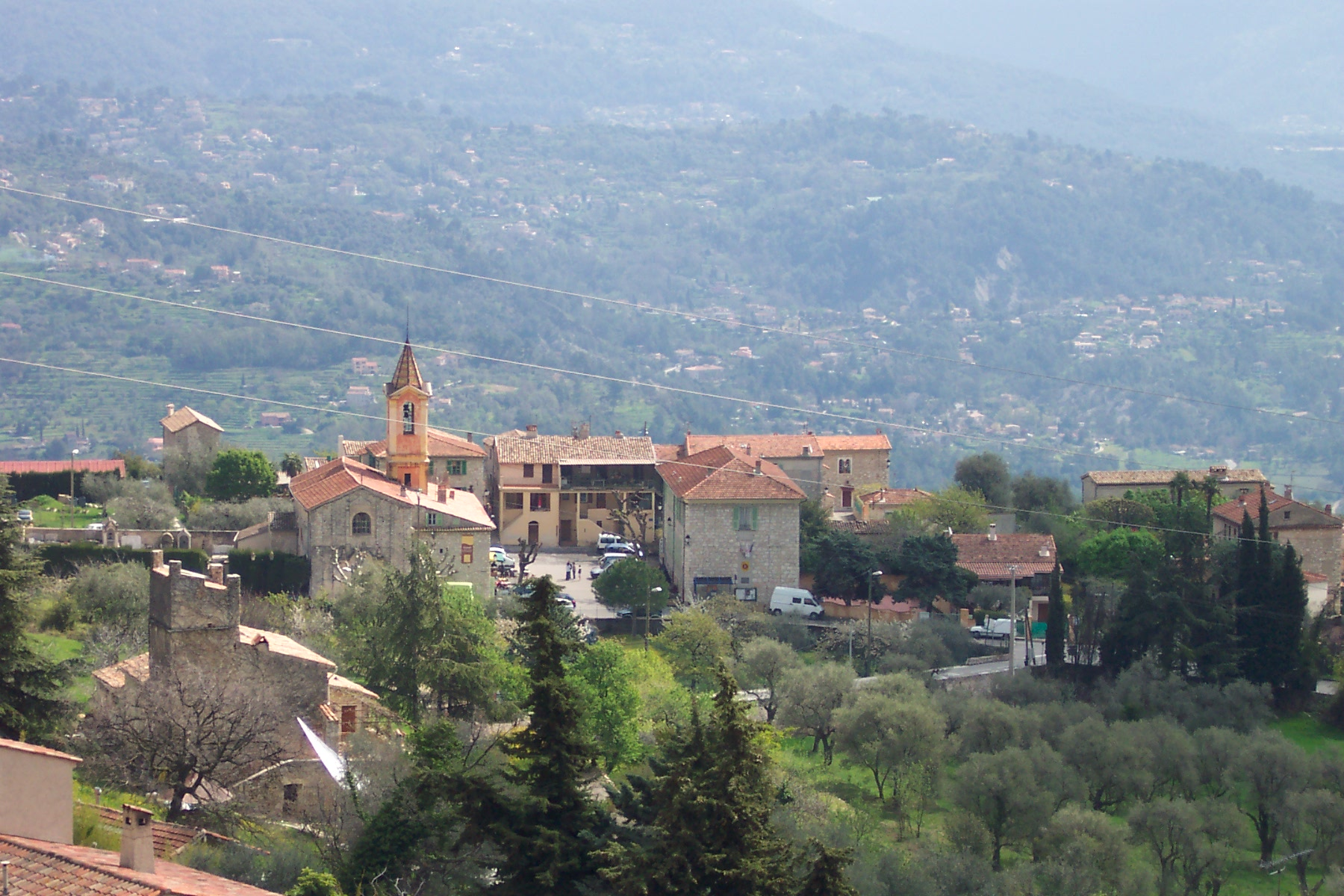
- A general view of Châteauneuf-Villevieille

- Coat of arms
- Location of Châteauneuf-Villevieille
- Location within France Location within Provence-Alpes-Côte d'Azur
- Coordinates: 43°48′00″N 7°17′00″E
- Country: France
- Region: Provence-Alpes-Côte d'Azur
- Department: Alpes-Maritimes
- Arrondissement: Nice
- Canton: Contes
- Intercommunality: Pays des Paillons

Government
  - Mayor (2026–32): Nicolas Bailet
- Area^{1}: 8.38 km^{2} (3.24 sq mi)
- Elevation: 650 m (2,130 ft)
- Highest elevation: 901 m (2,956 ft)
- Lowest elevation: 234 m (768 ft)
- Population (2023): 997
  - Density: 119/km^{2} (308/sq mi)
- Demonym: Madounencs
- Time zone: UTC+01:00 (CET)
  - Summer (DST): UTC+02:00 (CEST)
- INSEE/Postal code: 06039 /06390
- ^{1} French Land Register data, which excludes lakes, ponds, glaciers > 1 km^{2} (0.386 sq mi or 247 acres) and river estuaries.

Châteauneuf-Villevieille (Occitan: Castèunòu e Vilavièlha; Italian: Castelnuovo Villavecchia) is a commune in the Alpes-Maritimes department in southeastern France.

== History ==
The village was founded in the Middle Ages by inhabitants of nearby Contes. They were seeking a site sheltered from the instability in the valley at the time.

Jean de Revest (?-1347) was the coseigneur (lord) of Châteauneuf. He was a knight, a judge in Avignon (1314), grand judge of Piedmont (1322), judge of appeal of the Kingdom of Sicily (1331), and lieutenant to the seneschal (1340). Born to a family that had been in Nice since the late 13th century, he later moved to Aix. In 1309 or 1310 he married Sybille Chabaud, lady of Châteauneuf and daughter of the noble Boniface Chabaud.

The territory of Bendejun and Cantaron belonged formerly to the commune. They were separated in 1911 to form separate communes.

Formerly called Châteauneuf, the commune was renamed Châteauneuf-de-Contes in 1961. In 1992, the name was changed again to Châteauneuf-Villevieille.

== Geography ==
It is located 22 km (14 mi) north of Nice, its administrative center , in the Férion mountain range.

== Population ==
Historical population
Year	Pop.	±% p.a.
1968	225	—
1975	260	+2.09%
1982	402	+6.42%
1990	571	+4.48%
1999	684	+2.03%
2007	830	+2.45%
2012	896	+1.54%
2017	922	+0.57%
2023	997	+1.31%
Source: INSEE

== Sights ==
At its center is a 12th-century church.

== See also ==
- Communes of the Alpes-Maritimes department
