= Paillon =

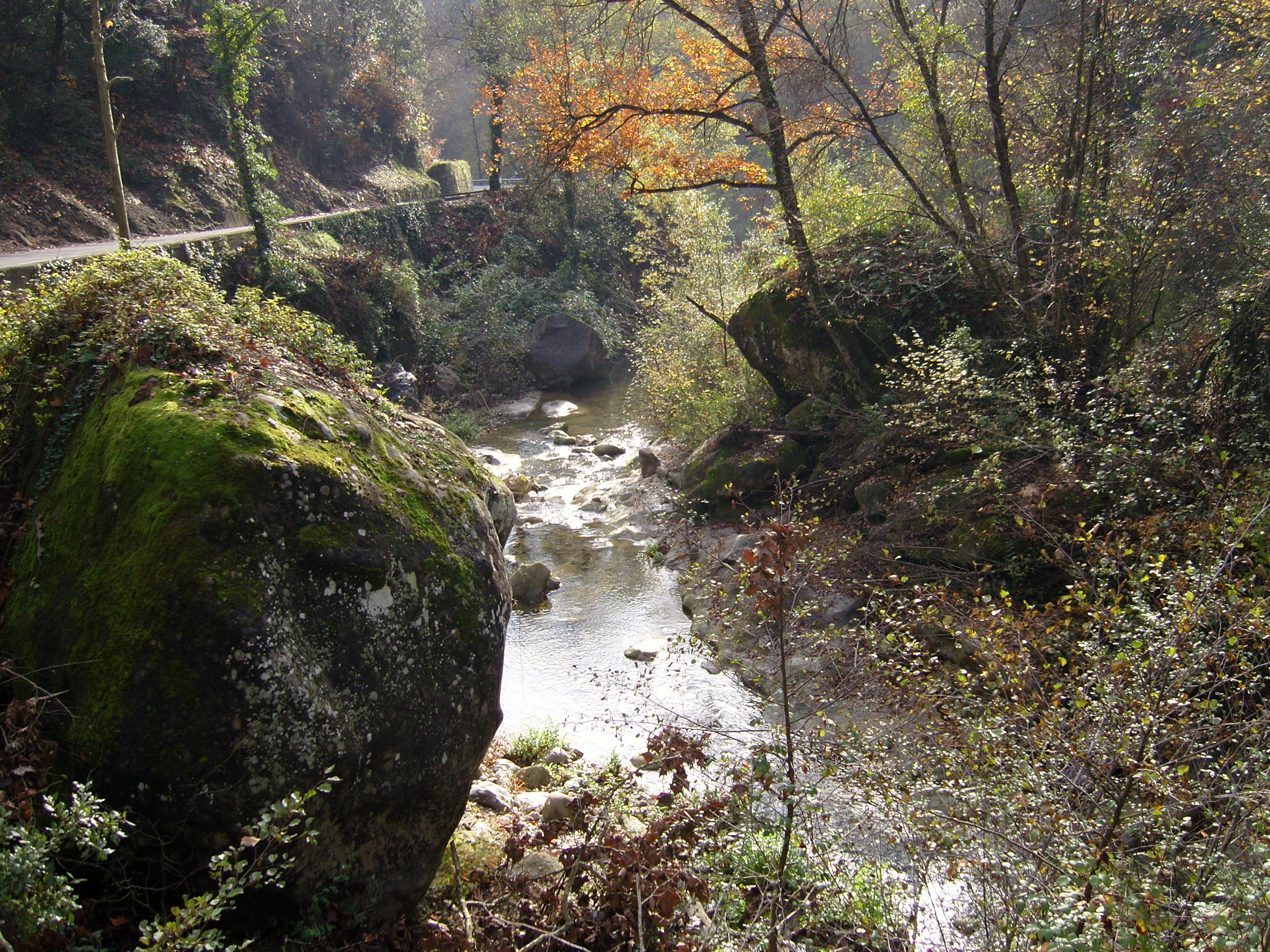
- The Paillon in Contes

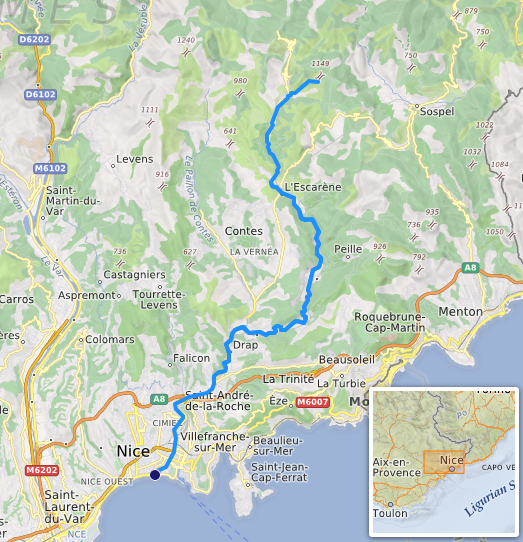

Location
- Country: France

Physical characteristics
- Mouth: Mediterranean Sea
  - coordinates: 43.6945°N 7.2679°E
- Length: 36 km (22 mi)
- Basin size: 258 km^{2} (100 sq mi)

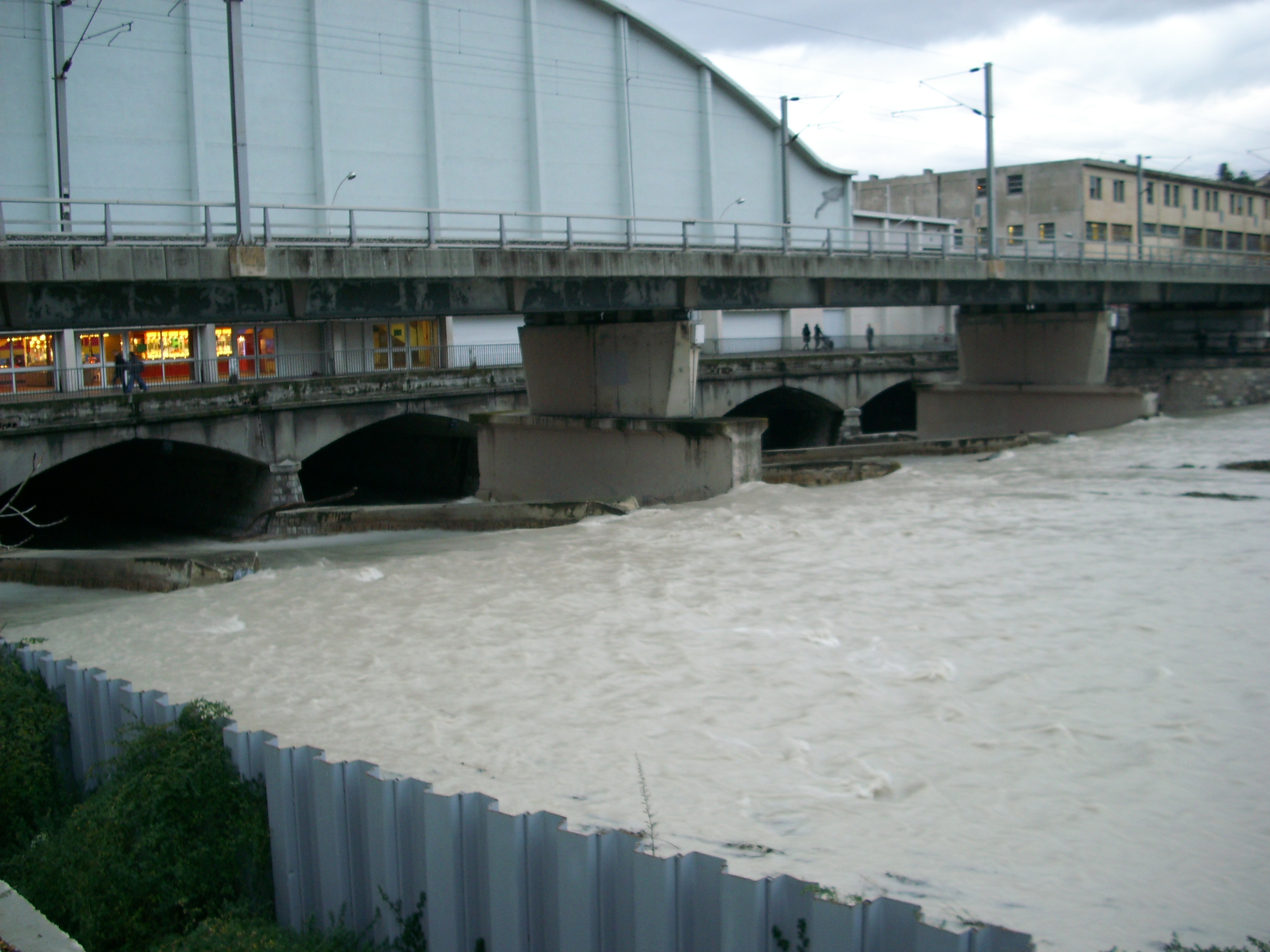
The Paillon near the Palais des Congrès Acropolis, during a flood

The Paillon (French pronunciation: [pajɔ̃]; Italian: Paglione Nissard Occitan: Palhon) is a coastal river of the Alpes-Maritimes that flows into the Mediterranean Sea in Nice, near the old district. It is 35.8 km (22.2 mi) long. Its drainage basin is 258 km^{2} (100 sq mi). Its source is north of Lucéram. It flows generally south, through L'Escarène, Peillon, Drap (where it meets its main tributary Paillon de Contes), La Trinité, and finally Nice.

Being a typical Mediterranean river with low water level throughout the year but with the autumn and winter rains can turn violent with damaging floods.

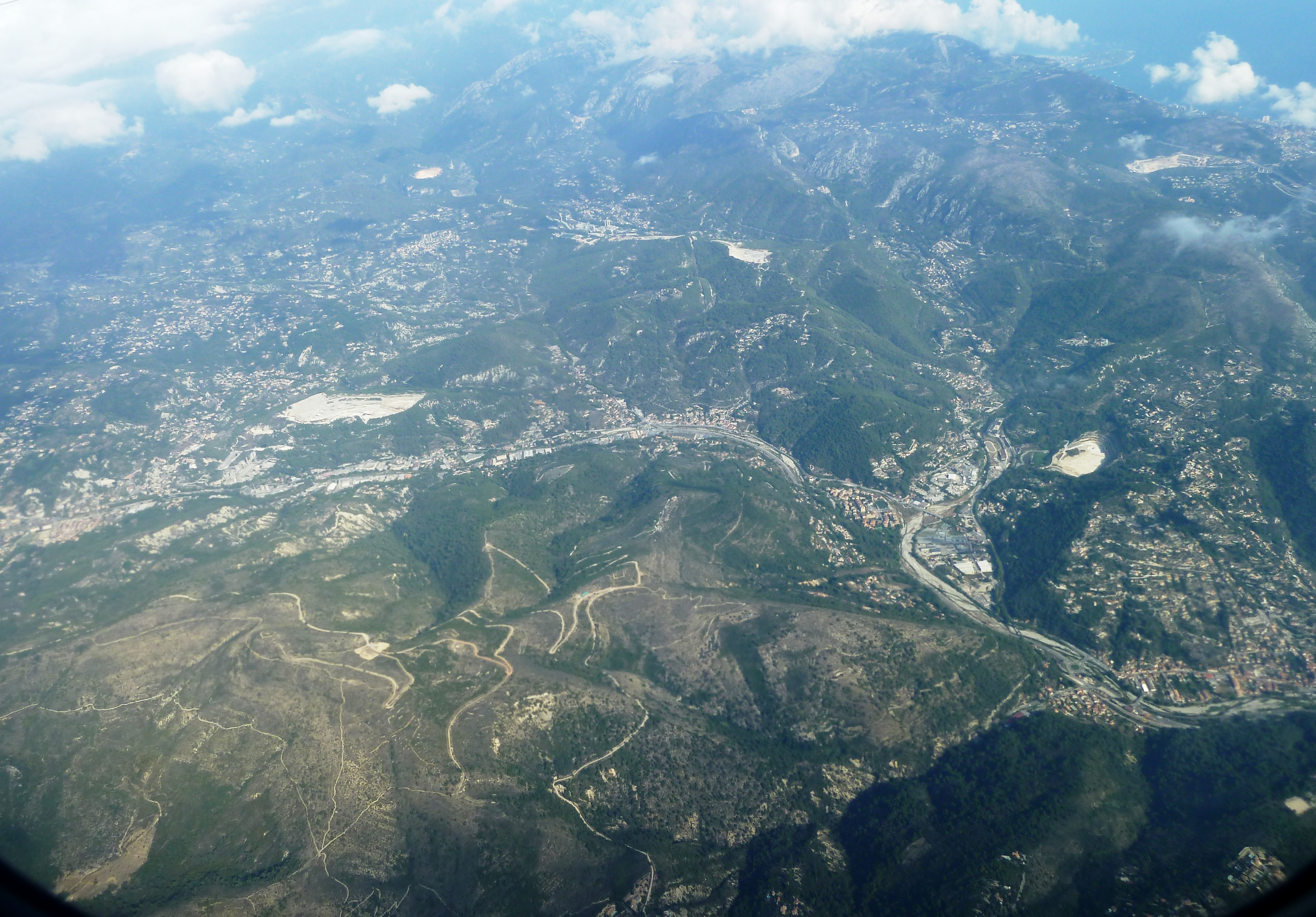
An overview of the Paillon in a valley

The region of the Paillon and the Paillon de Contes is called the pays des Paillons. The river course was covered and converted into a subterranean stream for its last few kilometers in the city of Nice starting at Rue Georges Chapel to its mouth at Plage de Carras. Two major buildings built over the stream are the LGT Lyceé Guillaume Apollinaire Nice High School the Palais des Congrès Acropolis.
