= L'Escarène =

Commune in Provence-Alpes-Côte d'Azur, France

L'Escarène L'Escarèa (Occitan)
- Commune
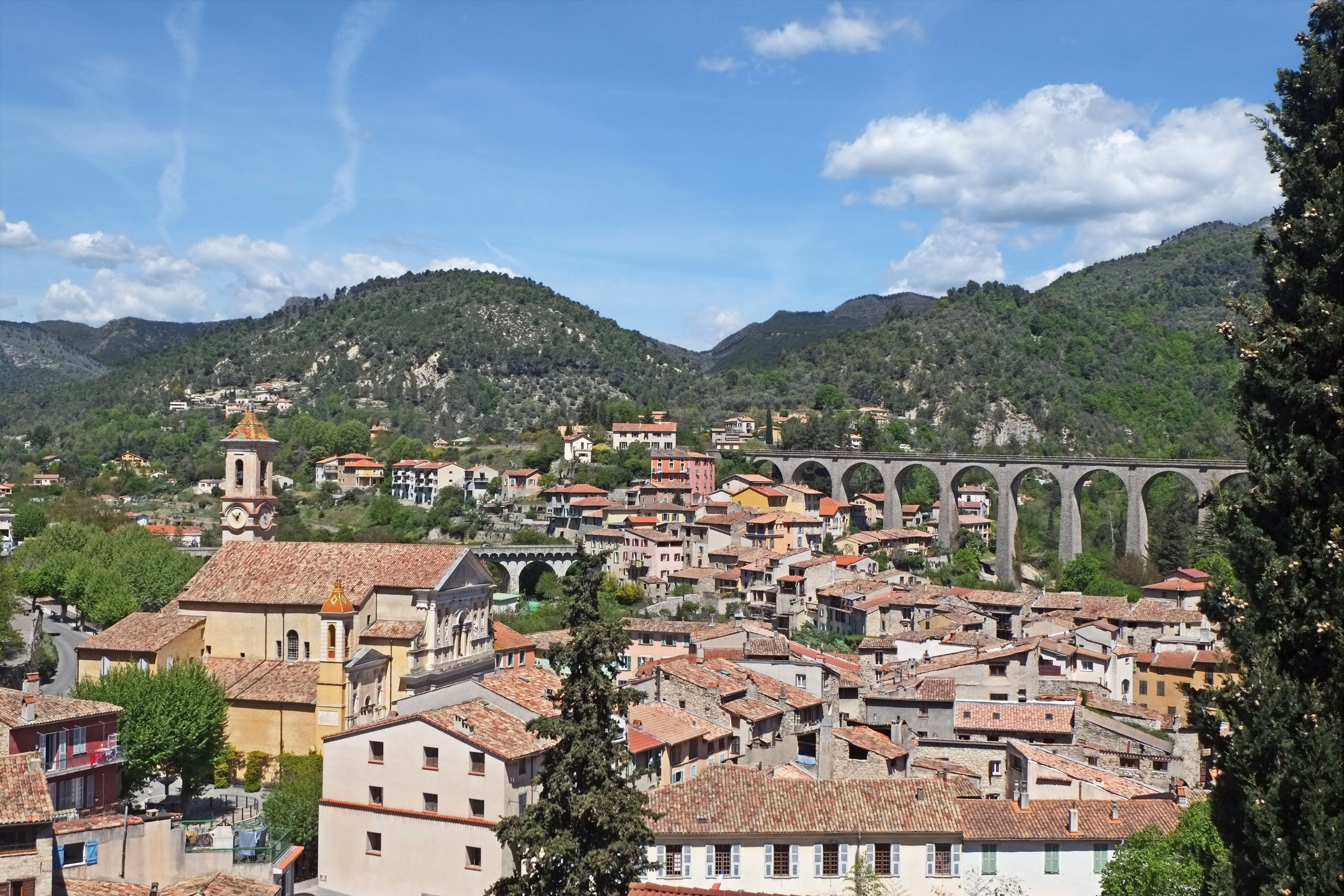
- L'Escarène and its surroundings, with the Viaduc de l'Escarène in the back, on the Nice–Breil-sur-Roya railway

- Coat of arms
- Location of L'Escarène
- Location within France Location within Provence-Alpes-Côte d'Azur
- Coordinates: 43°50′07″N 7°21′26″E
- Country: France
- Region: Provence-Alpes-Côte d'Azur
- Department: Alpes-Maritimes
- Arrondissement: Nice
- Canton: Contes
- Intercommunality: Pays des Paillons

Government
  - Mayor (2026–32): Celine Duquesne
- Area^{1}: 10.67 km^{2} (4.12 sq mi)
- Elevation: 345 m (1,132 ft)
- Highest elevation: 1,054 m (3,458 ft)
- Lowest elevation: 220 m (720 ft)
- Population (2023): 2,585
  - Density: 242.3/km^{2} (627.5/sq mi)
- Demonym: Escarénois
- Time zone: UTC+01:00 (CET)
  - Summer (DST): UTC+02:00 (CEST)
- INSEE/Postal code: 06057 /06440
- ^{1} French Land Register data, which excludes lakes, ponds, glaciers > 1 km^{2} (0.386 sq mi or 247 acres) and river estuaries.

L'Escarène (French pronunciation: [lɛskaʁɛn]; Occitan: L'Escarèa; Italian: Scarena, formerly) is a commune in the Alpes-Maritimes department in the southeastern Provence-Alpes-Côte d'Azur region in France.

It was part of the historic County of Nice until 1860, named Scarena. In modern Italian, it is known as L'Escarena. The town was a main stop along the Route de Sel during the 14th, 15th and 16th centuries, between the French Provence and Italian Piedmont, on the Nice to Turin road. It was built in the bottom of the valley of Spangle of Escarène at the confluence of the streams of Redebraus and Paillon. More than half of its territory is made up of pine and oak, with marked trails for easy walks and hikes.

In 2022, the commune was the scene of a group lynching, after which a 39-year-old man accused of stealing died.

== Transport ==
- Train: the town is served by the line from Nice to Breil-sur-Roya.
- Road The Departmental road 2204 passes through the town.

== Borders ==
- Northwest = Lucéram
- North = Touët-de-l'Escarène
- Northeast = Peille
- East = Peille
- Southeast = Peille
- South = Blausasc
- Southwest = Berre-les-Alpes
- West = Berre-les-Alpes

== Climate ==
Climate data for L'Escarène (1981-2010), altitude: 380 m
Month	Jan	Feb	Mar	Apr	May	Jun	Jul	Aug	Sep	Oct	Nov	Dec	Year
Mean daily maximum °C (°F)	9.8 (49.6)	11.1 (52.0)	14.8 (58.6)	17.9 (64.2)	22.8 (73.0)	27.0 (80.6)	30.8 (87.4)	30.4 (86.7)	25.0 (77.0)	19.1 (66.4)	13.2 (55.8)	10.0 (50.0)	19.3 (66.8)
Daily mean °C (°F)	5.1 (41.2)	6.0 (42.8)	8.8 (47.8)	11.7 (53.1)	16.2 (61.2)	20.0 (68.0)	23.1 (73.6)	23.0 (73.4)	18.6 (65.5)	14.0 (57.2)	8.8 (47.8)	5.7 (42.3)	13.4 (56.2)
Mean daily minimum °C (°F)	0.3 (32.5)	0.8 (33.4)	2.9 (37.2)	5.5 (41.9)	9.6 (49.3)	13.0 (55.4)	15.5 (59.9)	15.6 (60.1)	12.2 (54.0)	8.9 (48.0)	4.4 (39.9)	1.5 (34.7)	7.5 (45.5)
Average precipitation mm (inches)	70.1 (2.76)	52.0 (2.05)	53.3 (2.10)	83.4 (3.28)	59.5 (2.34)	45.1 (1.78)	20.6 (0.81)	30.0 (1.18)	84.0 (3.31)	131.7 (5.19)	120.1 (4.73)	98.4 (3.87)	848.2 (33.4)
Average precipitation days (≥ 1 mm)	5.8	4.9	5.3	8.2	7.1	5.3	3.3	3.6	6	7.8	7.5	6.6	71.4
Source: Infoclimat

== Toponymy ==
The name of the town comes from the ancient Occitan and Franco-Provençal 'scarenna', a common name in the Alps and the wider Southeast (l'Escarène, Echarenne, Echerenne, Eycherennes, Eysserennes, Echirène, Echarasson, Chérennes, etc.). The word derives from the Latin 'scala', "scale", with classic passage of the intervocalic in 'r'. In place names, it refers to the edge, the steepest part of the mountain which can be reached by degrees as of a ladder.

In Occitan Nice, the name of the town is L'Escarène according to classical norm and standard Mistralian. The inhabitants are called Escarénois. Scarena was the official Italian name of the municipality in 1814 and 1860.

== History ==
The village is cited in history since the eleventh century. In 1037 there was a St. Peter's Church in L'Escarène. The stronghold of 'Lescarena' 'or' 'Scarena' 'belonged to the Saint-Pons Abbey, Nice.

A castle was built there in the first half of the thirteenth century, but was destroyed in 1252. The first houses were built in the late thirteenth century. The oldest known house is' 'the Maioun de Pie' at Safranier. It has no doors or windows; entry is gained thru the roof via ladder.

In 1520 the village was detached from the municipality of Peille. The lordship of the town belonged to a Nice consul family, Tonduti, who bore the title of Count of L'Escarène. Until 1570, the village developed on the slopes of Mount Pifourchier.

The development of the Salt Road between Nice and Piedmont by L'Escarène, Lucéram, Lantosque and Vésubie Valley connected the town to the outside world. The construction of the Royal Road (Nice-Turin) by the Col di Tenda will increase the importance of the city as a stopping point.

An earthquake damaged the region on 23 February 1887. On 30 October 1928, the railway line from Nice to Breil-sur-Roya was inaugurated.

== List of mayors ==
- 1861–1865 Octave Deleuse
- 1865–1870 Louis Arnulf
- 1870–1871 Henri Rostagni
- 1871–1874 Jean-Baptiste Cauvin
- 1874–1876 Augustin Faraut
- 1876–1884 Louis Arnulf
- 1884–1885 Pierre Pasquier
- 1885–1886 Romulus Arnulf
- 1886–1890 Louis Arnulf
- 1890–1894 François Alardi
- 1894–1896 Henri Fulconis
- 1896–1906 Thérésius Bianchi
- 1906–1908 Henri Fulconis
- 1908–1912 Jules Sioly
- 1912–1919 André Bianchi
- 1919–1940 Paul Roux
- 1944–1947 Xavier Faraut
- 1947–1957 Louis Blancart
- 1957–1962 Paul Roux
- 1962–1976 Godéart Pachiaudi
- 1976–1980 José Martel
- 1980–2001 Gilbert Cardon
- 2001–
- 2008–2026 Pierre Donadey
- 2026-inc. Celine Duquesne

== Cultural events ==
In 1991 the Ancient Music Festival l'Escarène and Paillon was initiated. This event has gained national renown..

Since 2000, the "Appointment of the Organ Alive" is organized every summer to showcase the organ-making history of the Grinda brothers. Several organ recitals are programmed in the months of August and September with prestigious organists.

== Places and monuments ==
- The church Saint-Pierre-ès-Liens and its listed historical organ, built by the Grinda brothers in 1791
- The White Penitents chapel
- The Chapel of the Black Penitents
- The oil mill and its museum
- The Old Bridge
- The area of Serre
- The war memorial
- The mausoleum
- The lavoirs
- The chapel Saint-Roch
- The chapel Saint -Pancrace
- The nature trail ScarénaBerra
- The Aiga park

== Demographics ==
Historical population

Year	Pop.	±% p.a.
1793	998	—
1822	1,685	+1.82%
1848	2,048	+0.75%
1872	1,627	−0.95%
1901	1,281	−0.82%
1926	1,467	+0.54%
1946	902	−2.40%
1962	1,223	+1.92%
1968	1,619	+4.79%

Year	Pop.	±% p.a.
1975	1,553	−0.59%
1982	1,424	−1.23%
1990	1,751	+2.62%
1999	2,128	+2.19%
2007	2,301	+0.98%
2012	2,449	+1.25%
2017	2,520	+0.57%
2023	2,585	+0.43%

Source: EHESS and INSEE (1968–2023)

== See also ==
- Communes of the Alpes-Maritimes department
