= Bust of René Goscinny =

Monument in Warsaw, Poland

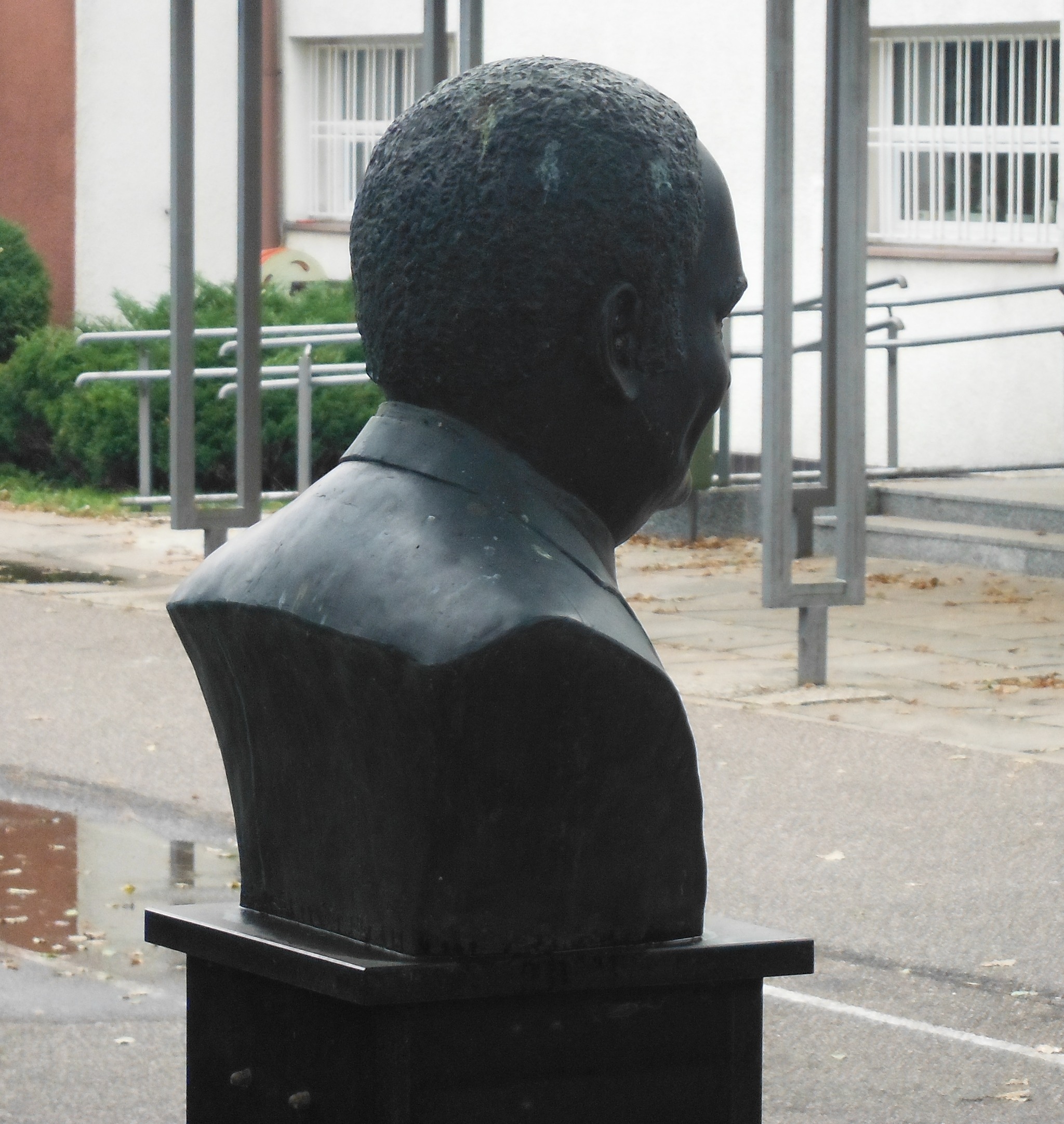
- The back of the bust in 2016.
- Interactive map of Bust of René Goscinny
- Location: 4 and 6 Walecznych Street, Praga-South, Warsaw, Poland
- Coordinates: 52°14′04.70″N 21°02′54″E
- Designer: Jacek Kowalski
- Type: Bust
- Material: Bronze
- Completion date: 25 September 2013
- Dedicated to: René Goscinny

The bust of René Goscinny (French pronunciation: [ʁəne ɡɔsini], Polish pronunciation: [ɡɔɕˈt͡ɕin.nɘ̟]; Polish: Popiersie René Goscinnego; French: Buste de René Goscinny) is a monument in the city of Warsaw, Poland, placed in front of the René Goscinny French High School at 4 and 6 Walecznych Street. It is located in the neighbourhood of Saska Kępa within the Praga-South. The monument is dedicated to René Goscinny, a 20th-century cartoonist and book author, known for works such as Little Nicolas and Asterix. It has the form of a bronze bust sculpture. The monument was designed by Jacek Kowalski, and unveiled on 25 September 2013.

== History ==
The monument commemorates René Goscinny, a 20th-century cartoonist and book author, known for works such as Little Nicolas and Asterix. It was designed by Jacek Kowalski, and unveiled on 25 September 2013. The ceremony was attended by his daughter, Anne Goscinny. It was the first monument in the world dedicated to him.

== Characteristics ==
The monument is placed in front of the René Goscinny French High School at 4 and 6 Walecznych Street. It has the form of a bronze bust sculpture of René Goscinny, 20th-century cartoonist and comic writer. The statue is placed on a pedestal, which features a plaque with the Polish inscription, which reads:

Polish inscription

René Goscinny
(1926–1977)
Twórca Mikołajka i Asteriksa

Translation:
English translation

René Goscinny
(1926–1977)
The creator of Little Nicolas and Asterix

== See also ==
- Statue of René Goscinny (Drap), another monument dedicated to Goscinny, located in Drap, France
- Statue of René Goscinny (Paris), another monument dedicated to Goscinny, located in Paris, France
