= Statue of René Goscinny (Paris) =

Monument in Paris, France

- Interactive map of Statue of René Goscinny
- Location: 54 Boulainvilliers Street, 16th arrondissement, Paris, France
- Coordinates: 48.856930°N 2.274911°E
- Designer: Sébastien Langloÿs
- Type: Statue
- Material: Bronze
- Opening date: 23 January 2020
- Dedicated to: René Goscinny

The statue of René Goscinny (French pronunciation: [ʁəne ɡɔsini], Polish pronunciation: [ɡɔɕˈt͡ɕin.nɘ̟]; French: Statue de René Goscinny) is a monument in Paris, France, located in the 16th arrondissement, at the corner of Boulainvilliers and Singer Streets. It has a form of a bronze statue of René Goscinny (1926–1977), a 20th-century cartoonist and comic writer. The monument was designed by Sébastien Langloÿs, and unveiled on 23 January 2020. It is a replica of the statue of René Goscinny in Drap, France, which was unveiled in 2017.

== History ==
The monument was dedicated to René Goscinny (1926–1977), a 20th-century cartoonist and comic writer. It was designed by Sébastien Langloÿs, and unveiled on 23 January 2020. It was based on an identical statue made by Langloÿs, which was unveiled in 2017 in front of the René Goscinny High School in Drap, within the region of Provence-Alps-Azure Coast in France. The pedestal on which it was placed was designed by the architectural and engineering firm C&E Architecture.

== Characteristics ==
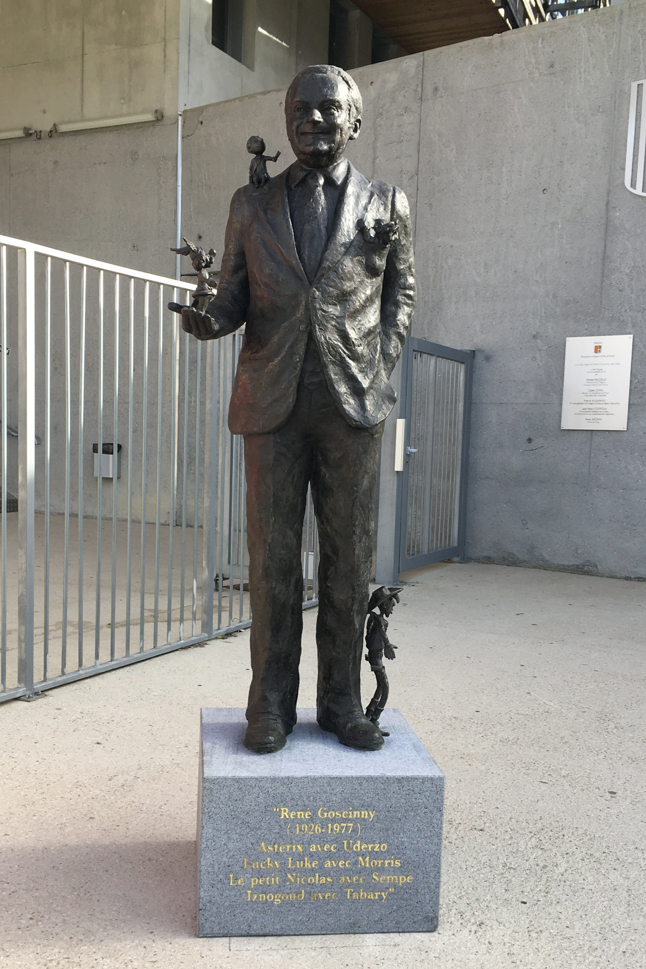
The identical statue in Drap, France, placed on a different pedestal.

The monument is placed at the corner of Boulainvilliers and Singer Streets, in the 16th arrondissement of Paris, next to the former residence of Goscinny at 54 Boulainvilliers Street.

The monument consists of the life-sized bronze statue of René Goscinny (1926–1977), a 20th-century cartoonist and comic writer, wearing a suit. It also includes small statues of characters from Goscinny's famous works. This includes Little Nicolas, a primary school student, sitting on Goscinny's right shoulder; Asterix, a Gaul warrior, standing on Goscinny's hand; Iznogoud, a nobleman, pocking out from the front pocket of his suit; and Lucky Luke, a cowboy standing next to Goscinny's left leg.

The statue is placed on a pedestal made from white stone, stylised to resemble a bookshelf. It has a form of a hollowed-out cube, with a sculpture of three books, inscribed with titles of Goscinny's works.

The right side of the pedestal features a plaque with the following inscription:

French inscription

En hommage à
René Goscinny (1926 – 1977)

Et á tous ceux qui ont érigé
la bande dessinée au rang de 9ème art

Ce monument est situé
sous les fenêtres de l'appartement
où vécut René Goscinny de 1967 à 1977

Translation:
English translation

In honour of
René Goscinny (1926–1977)

And to all of those
who have elevated comics [bande dessinée] to the rank of the 9th form of art

This monument is placed
below the windows of the apartment
in which René Goscinny lived from 1967 to 1977

== Gallery ==
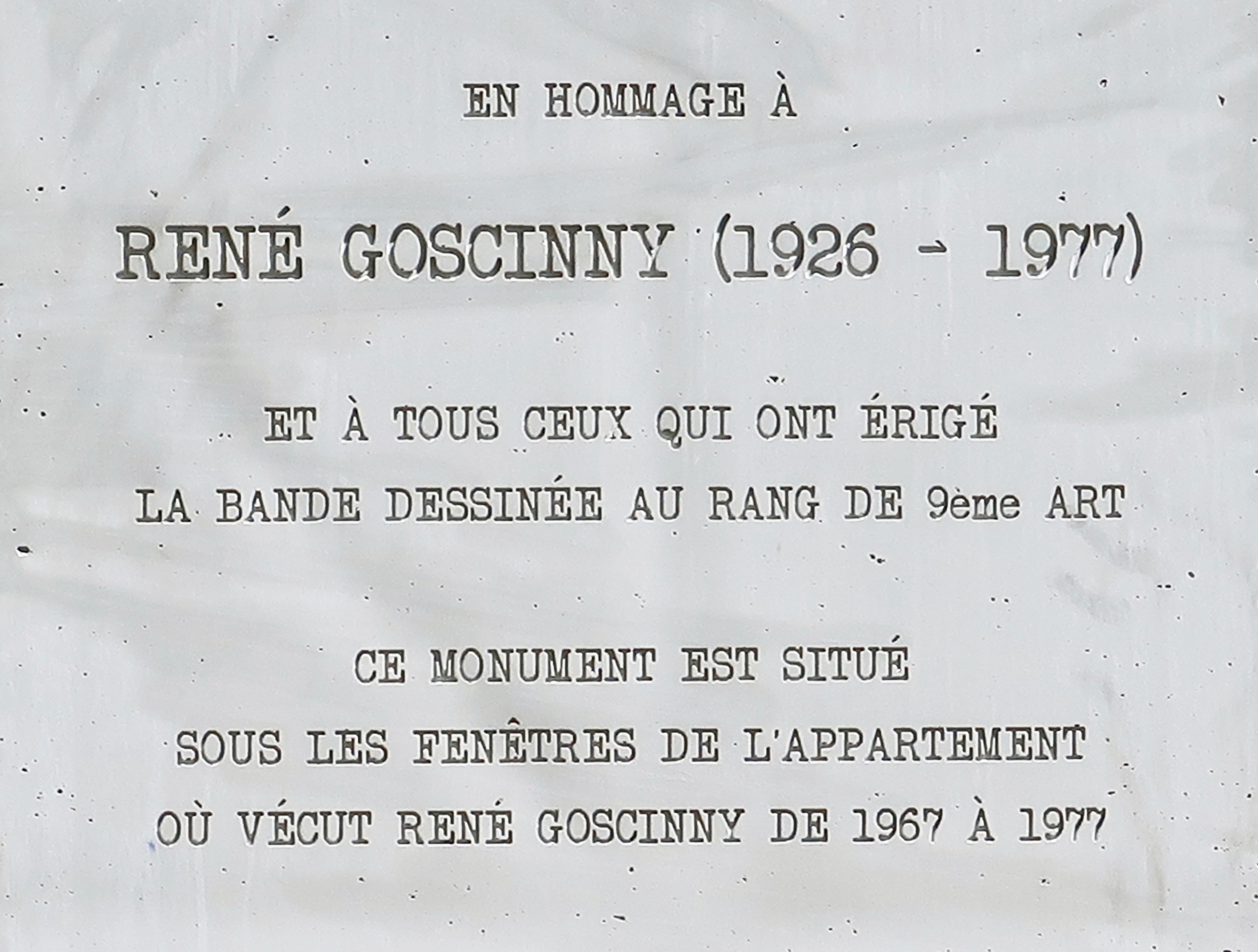
The inscription on the side of the monument's pedestal.

== See also ==
- Bust of René Goscinny, another monument dedicated to Goscinny, located in Warsaw, Poland
- Statue of René Goscinny (Drap), another monument dedicated to Goscinny, located in Drap, France
