= Haroun El Poussah =

Character in the Iznogoud comics series

Haroun El Poussah, also known in English as Haroun El Plassid, is the Abbasid caliph in the Iznogoud comics series, created by René Goscinny and Jean Tabary.

== Character ==
Haroun El Poussah is a middle-aged, corpulent man whose main characteristic is his extremely docile nature. He can be seen as the embodiment of a benevolent and benign ruler. He has never been shown to have any conflict with any of his subjects. Because of this, he is extremely popular and loved among his people.

Haroun El Poussah's name is a pun on the historical caliph Harun al-Rashid. Poussah is a word of Sanskrit origin (bodhisattva) derived via Chinese (púsà) and historically used in French to describe a fat man, in connection with the image of Budai. His English name of Haroun El Plassid is a pun on Rashid and the character's placid nature.

All Haroun El Poussah cares about is eating, sleeping and having lazy fun. He spends most of his time asleep, waking only when it's time to eat, when some servant shows him a fancy western object or when his grand vizier Iznogoud (the protagonist) appears to invite him to some sort of new activity, which invariably turns out to be a trap of the plot to get rid of him and get Iznogoud elected as the new caliph.

The plots never work, and Haroun El Poussah remains completely oblivious of them, confident that Iznogoud loves him and wants only the best for him, often calling him "my good Iznogoud". It is shown that everyone in Baghdad, except the caliph, knows that Iznogoud is up to no good toward him.

Haroun El Poussah's caliphate is actually an electoral monarchy, with elections for the new caliph held every ten years. However, because only the incumbent caliph has the right to vote, every election always has the same result.

Haroun El Poussah has three brothers: Deuroun El Poussah, Troiroun El Poussah and Quatroun El Poussah (each of the syllables before the -roun is a French number going from two to four), whom Iznogoud confronted in the album Enfin Calife! ("Caliph at last!").

== Publication history ==
The character first appeared in the Franco-Belgian comics magazine Record on January 15, 1962. After four years, the strip shifted to Goscinny's Pilote magazine in 1968. Initially, the Iznogoud series was named Les Aventures du calife Haroun El Poussah, but it was eventually decided that Haroun El Poussah was too weak a character to be the focal character of the comic strip. The title was then passed on to Iznogoud, despite that he is the villain.

== Sources ==
- "Le calife Haroun el Poussah dans Record". BD oubliées (in French). Archived from the original on 14 June 2007.
- "Le calife Haroun el Poussah et le grand vizir Iznogoud dans Pilote". BD oubliées (in French). Archived from the original on 27 December 2018.
