= René Raphy =

French footballer (1920–2008)

Personal information
- Full name: René Raphy Adolphe
- Date of birth: 27 December 1920
- Place of birth: Saint-Mandé, Val-de-Marne, France
- Date of death: 11 May 2008 (aged 87)
- Place of death: Peille, Alpes-Maritimes, France
- Position: Striker

Senior career*
Years	Team	Apps	(Gls)
1943–1944	EF Paris-Ile-de-France		
1944–1945	Stade Français		
1945–1946	Rennes		
1946–1947	Angers SCO		
1947–1948	OGC Nice		
1948–1949	U.S. Sanremese Calcio		
1949–1950	A.C. Pistoiese		
1950–1953	Real Murcia	57	(21)
- * Club domestic league appearances and goals

René Raphy (27 December 1920 – 11 May 2008) is a former French footballer.
