= Canton of Contes =

Canton of France

Coordinates: 43.81°N 7.32°E

- Canton
- Situation of the canton of Contes in the department of Alpes-Maritimes
- Country: France
- Region: Provence-Alpes-Côte d'Azur
- Department: Alpes-Maritimes
- No. of communes: {{{nbcomm}}}
- Population (2023): 37,789
- INSEE code: 0610

The canton of Contes is an administrative division of the Alpes-Maritimes department, southeastern France. Its borders were modified at the French canton reorganisation which came into effect in March 2015. Its seat is in Contes.

It consists of the following communes:

1. Bendejun
2. Berre-les-Alpes
3. Blausasc
4. Breil-sur-Roya
5. La Brigue
6. Cantaron
7. Châteauneuf-Villevieille
8. Coaraze
9. Contes
10. Drap
11. L'Escarène
12. Fontan
13. Lucéram
14. Moulinet
15. Peille
16. Peillon
17. Saorge
18. Sospel
19. Tende
20. Touët-de-l'Escarène
