= Paillon de Contes =

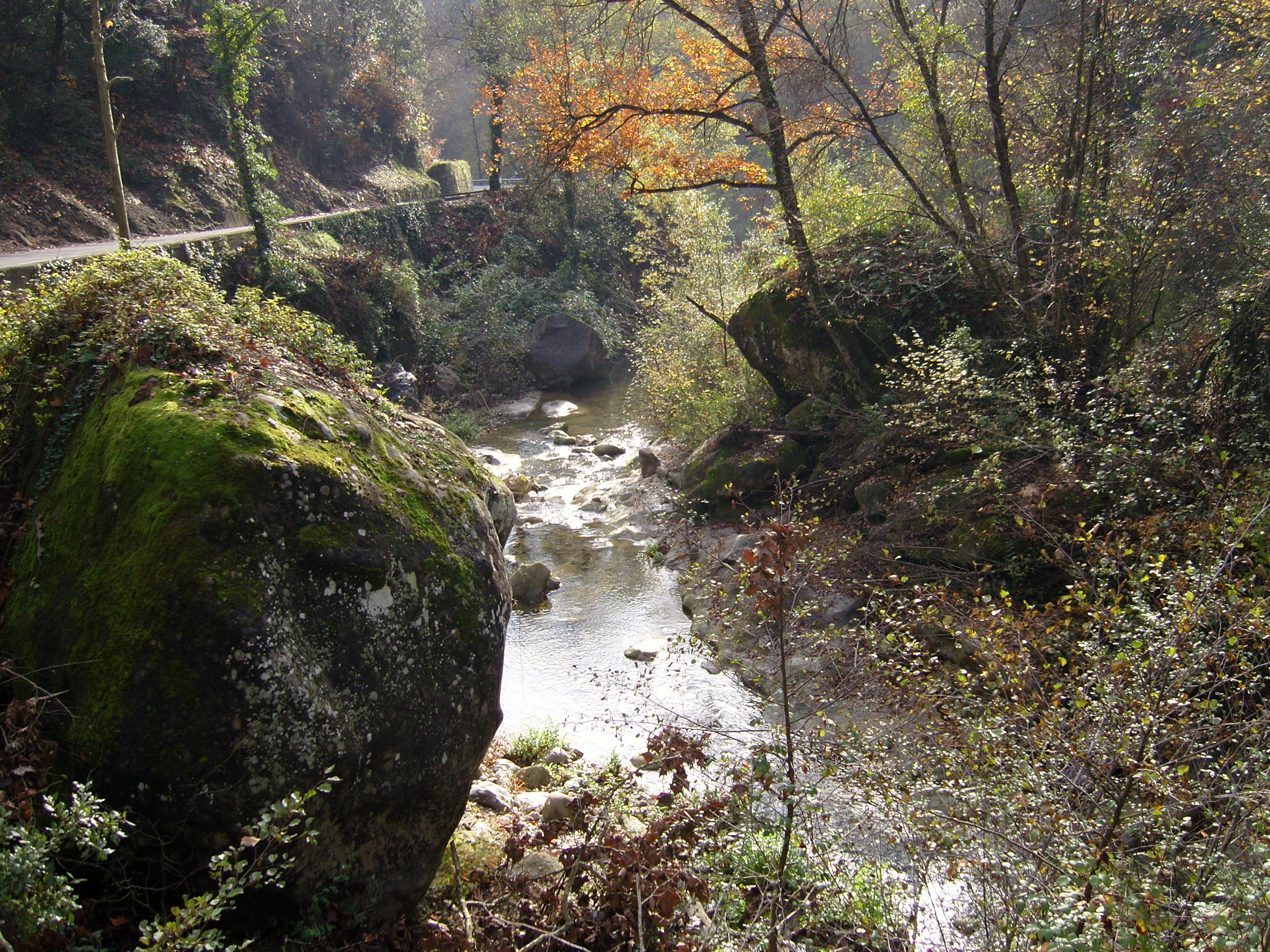

Location
- Country: France
- Region: Provence-Alpes-Côte d'Azur
- Department: Alpes-Maritimes

Physical characteristics
- Mouth: Paillon
  - coordinates: 43.768056°N 7.328611°E
- Length: 21.54 km (13.38 mi)

The Paillon de Contes (French pronunciation: [pajɔ̃ də kɔ̃t]) is a river in the Alpes-Maritimes Department of France. It flows south into the Paillon River. Its sources are the Garde Stream, The Riou, The Ray, and the Nugo Stream.
