= Touët-de-l'Escarène =

Commune in Provence-Alpes-Côte d'Azur, France

- Commune
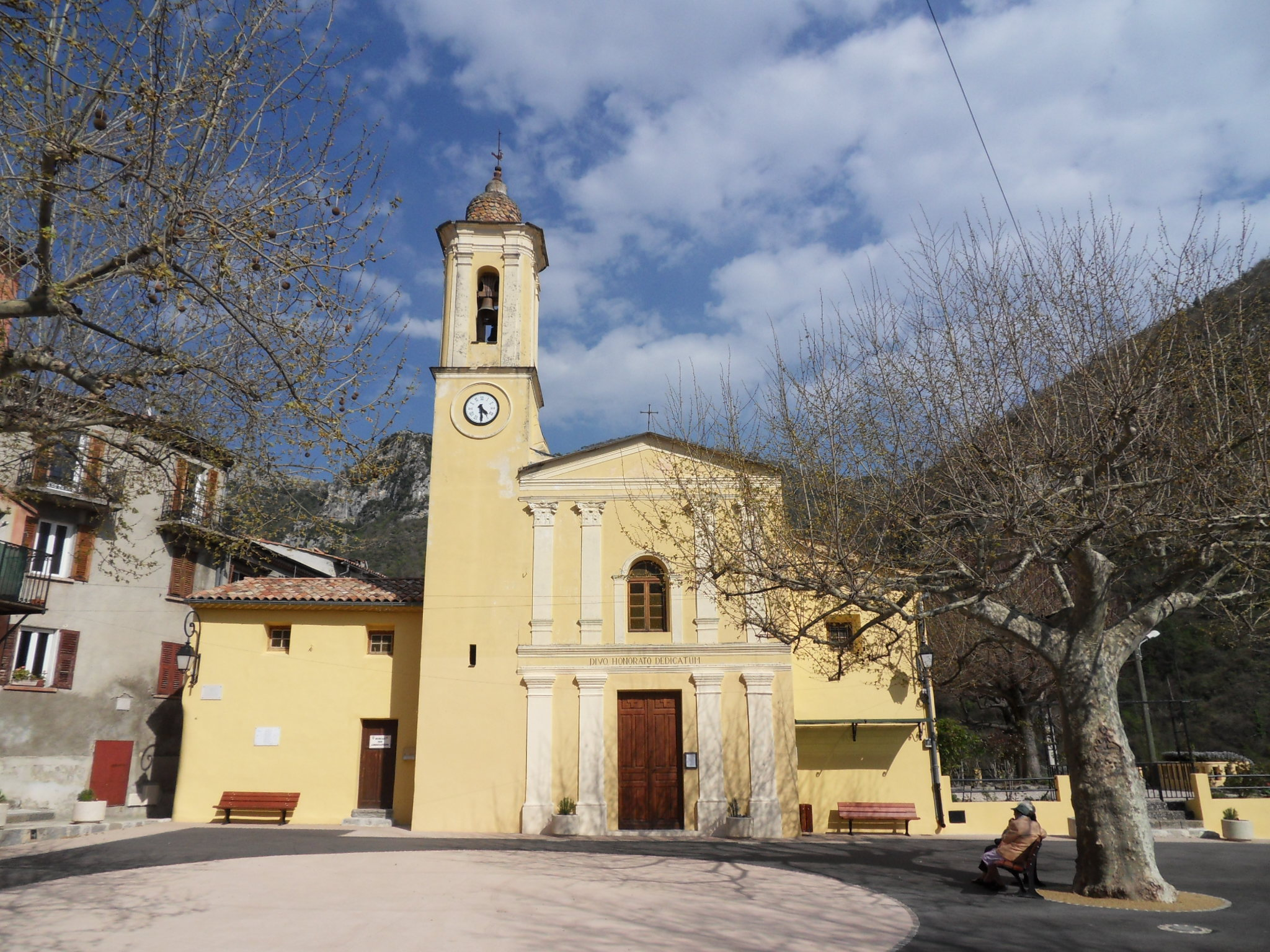
- The church of Saint-Martin

- Coat of arms
- Location of Touët-de-l'Escarène
- Location within France Location within Provence-Alpes-Côte d'Azur
- Coordinates: 43°50′54″N 7°21′57″E
- Country: France
- Region: Provence-Alpes-Côte d'Azur
- Department: Alpes-Maritimes
- Arrondissement: Nice
- Canton: Contes
- Intercommunality: Pays des Paillons

Government
  - Mayor (2026–32): Audrey Legeret
- Area^{1}: 4.57 km^{2} (1.76 sq mi)
- Elevation: 415 m (1,362 ft)
- Highest elevation: 1,080 m (3,540 ft)
- Lowest elevation: 374 m (1,227 ft)
- Population (2023): 300
  - Density: 66/km^{2} (170/sq mi)
- Demonym: Touétois
- Time zone: UTC+01:00 (CET)
  - Summer (DST): UTC+02:00 (CEST)
- INSEE/Postal code: 06142 /06440
- ^{1} French Land Register data, which excludes lakes, ponds, glaciers > 1 km^{2} (0.386 sq mi or 247 acres) and river estuaries.

Touët-de-l'Escarène (French pronunciation: [twɛ də lɛskaʁɛn], literally Touët of L'Escarène; Occitan: Toet; Italian: Toetto di Scarena) is a commune in the Alpes-Maritimes department in southeastern France.

== Population ==
Historical population
Year	Pop.	±% p.a.
1968	173	—
1975	137	−3.28%
1982	173	+3.39%
1990	212	+2.57%
1999	242	+1.48%
2007	287	+2.15%
2012	313	+1.75%
2017	282	−2.06%
2023	300	+1.04%
Source: INSEE

== See also ==
- Communes of the Alpes-Maritimes department
