= Peille =

Commune in Provence-Alpes-Côte d'Azur, France

Peille Pelha (Occitan)
- Commune
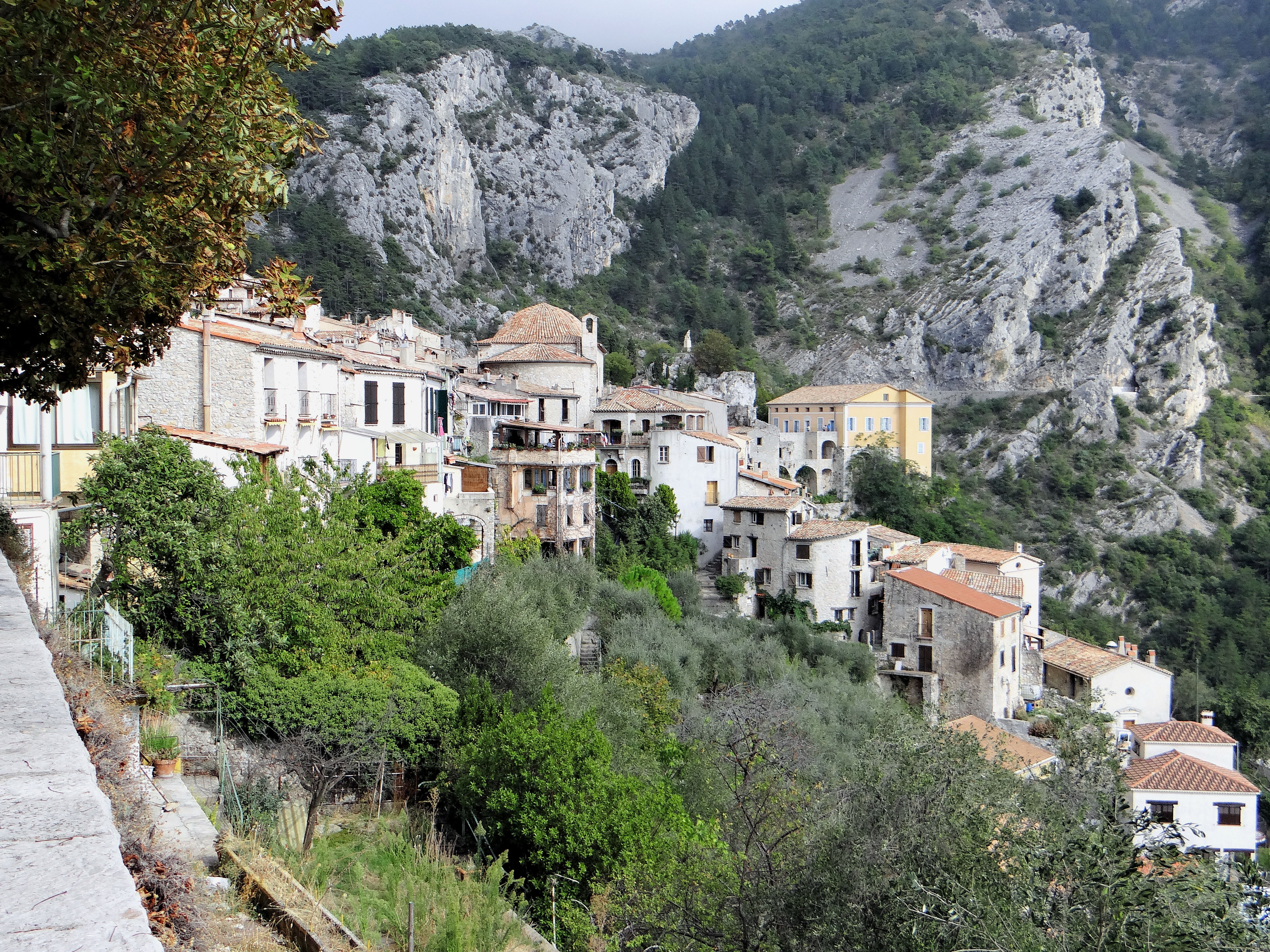
- The village seen from the chapel of Saint-Roch

- Coat of arms
- Location of Peille
- Location within France Location within Provence-Alpes-Côte d'Azur
- Coordinates: 43°48′11″N 7°24′09″E
- Country: France
- Region: Provence-Alpes-Côte d'Azur
- Department: Alpes-Maritimes
- Arrondissement: Nice
- Canton: Contes

Government
  - Mayor (2026–32): Cyril Piazza
- Area^{1}: 43.16 km^{2} (16.66 sq mi)
- Highest elevation: 1,268 m (4,160 ft)
- Lowest elevation: 190 m (620 ft)
- Population (2023): 2,123
  - Density: 49.19/km^{2} (127.4/sq mi)
- Time zone: UTC+01:00 (CET)
  - Summer (DST): UTC+02:00 (CEST)
- INSEE/Postal code: 06091 /06440
- ^{1} French Land Register data, which excludes lakes, ponds, glaciers > 1 km^{2} (0.386 sq mi or 247 acres) and river estuaries.

Peille (French pronunciation: [pɛj]; Occitan: Pelha; Italian: Peglio Marittimo) is a commune perched on a rock between Monaco and Menton in the Alpes Maritimes department in southeastern France.

It overlooks the River Peillon. Higher still than the village are the ruins of a château dating from the thirteenth century.

Peille includes the quartiers of La Grave de Peille, where the cement works of VICAT is located, Paravieille, Gaudissart, St. Martin de Peille, La Paran, Les Lacs, Colletta Soubrana de la Grava, Colletta Soutrana de la Grava.

Peille borders Blausasc, Peillon, and La Turbie.

It is thought the area was once home to a little-known Ligurian tribe the Oratelli of Peille Today the village is notable for its narrow streets, small squares, and architecture dating to the Medieval period. Examples of this architecture include the remnants of the village fortifications, the 14th century courthouse known as the "Palais des Consuls". On the very edge of the cliff face is a large building known as the "Palais des Lascaris" this too dates from the fourteenth century. The village has a twelfth-century church in the Romanesque style with ancient frescos decorating its interior.

== Population ==
The inhabitants are called either Peillois or Peillasques in French.

Historical population
Year	Pop.	±% p.a.
1968	1,253	—
1975	1,291	+0.43%
1982	1,622	+3.31%
1990	1,836	+1.56%
1999	2,045	+1.21%
2007	2,271	+1.32%
2012	2,317	+0.40%
2017	2,376	+0.50%
2023	2,123	−1.86%
Source: INSEE

== Climate ==
Climate data for Peille (1981-2010), altitude: 1106 m
Month	Jan	Feb	Mar	Apr	May	Jun	Jul	Aug	Sep	Oct	Nov	Dec	Year
Mean daily maximum °C (°F)	6.8 (44.2)	7.2 (45.0)	9.9 (49.8)	11.5 (52.7)	16.5 (61.7)	20.2 (68.4)	23.2 (73.8)	23.2 (73.8)	18.3 (64.9)	14.5 (58.1)	9.8 (49.6)	7.1 (44.8)	14.0 (57.2)
Daily mean °C (°F)	3.8 (38.8)	3.9 (39.0)	6.4 (43.5)	8.2 (46.8)	12.9 (55.2)	16.5 (61.7)	19.4 (66.9)	19.4 (66.9)	14.9 (58.8)	11.4 (52.5)	6.9 (44.4)	4.3 (39.7)	10.7 (51.2)
Mean daily minimum °C (°F)	0.7 (33.3)	0.7 (33.3)	2.9 (37.2)	4.7 (40.5)	9.4 (48.9)	12.8 (55.0)	15.5 (59.9)	15.7 (60.3)	11.5 (52.7)	8.3 (46.9)	4.0 (39.2)	1.5 (34.7)	7.3 (45.2)
Average precipitation mm (inches)	83.2 (3.28)	46.1 (1.81)	40.1 (1.58)	89.6 (3.53)	52.9 (2.08)	36.4 (1.43)	16.3 (0.64)	28.2 (1.11)	106.3 (4.19)	133.8 (5.27)	130.0 (5.12)	102.9 (4.05)	865.8 (34.09)
Average precipitation days (≥ 1 mm)	5.7	4.1	4.5	8.1	6.2	4.7	2.7	3.3	6.8	8.2	7.5	6.7	68.5
Source: Infoclimat

== See also ==
- Communes of the Alpes-Maritimes department
