= René Goscinny French High School =

Lycée Français de Varsovie
- Liceum Francuskie w Warszawie

Location
- Secondary school and HQ: ul. Walecznych 4/6 03-916 Warszawa; Preschool and elementary school: ul. Konstancińska 13 02-942 Warszawa; Warsaw; Poland

Information
- Type: French international school
- Website: lfv.pl

Lycée Français René Goscinny de Varsovie (Polish: Liceum Francuskie w Warszawie) is a French international school in Warsaw, Poland. It has two campuses: one houses the school administration, collège (junior high school), and lycée (senior high school). The other houses maternelle (preschool) and primaire (primary school).

It is directly operated by the Agency for French Education Abroad (AEFE), an agency of the French government.

Campuses in Warsaw
