= Contes, Alpes-Maritimes =

Commune in Provence-Alpes-Côte d'Azur, France

Contes
- Commune
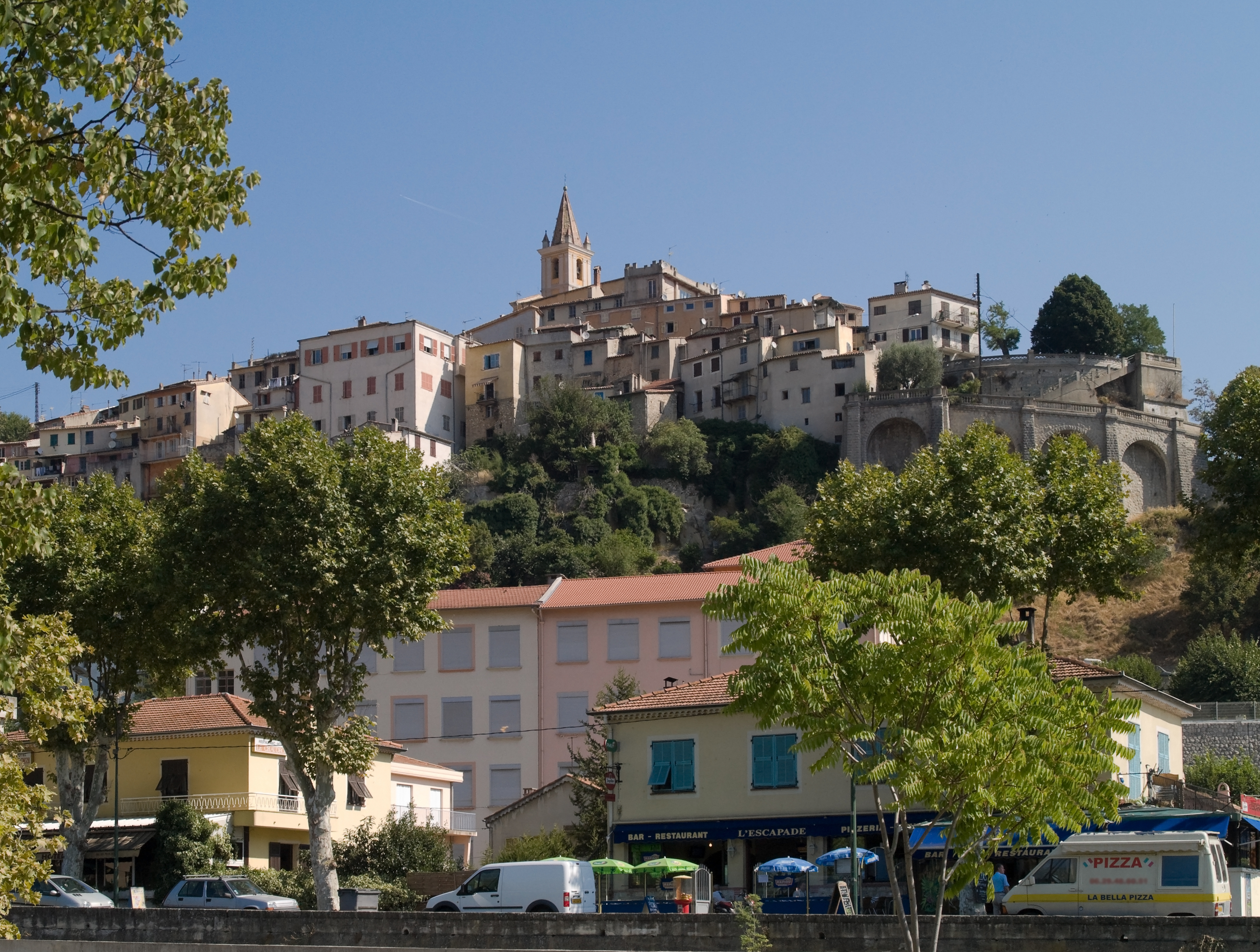
- A view of Contes, looking up to the tower of the church of Sainte-Marie-Madeleine

- Coat of arms
- Location of Contes
- Location within France Location within Provence-Alpes-Côte d'Azur
- Coordinates: 43°48′46″N 7°18′52″E
- Country: France
- Region: Provence-Alpes-Côte d'Azur
- Department: Alpes-Maritimes
- Arrondissement: Nice
- Canton: Contes
- Intercommunality: Pays des Paillons

Government
  - Mayor (2026–32): Francis Tujague
- Area^{1}: 19.47 km^{2} (7.52 sq mi)
- Elevation: 290 m (950 ft)
- Highest elevation: 642 m (2,106 ft)
- Lowest elevation: 123 m (404 ft)
- Population (2023): 7,897
  - Density: 405.6/km^{2} (1,050/sq mi)
- Demonym: Contois
- Time zone: UTC+01:00 (CET)
  - Summer (DST): UTC+02:00 (CEST)
- INSEE/Postal code: 06048 /06390
- ^{1} French Land Register data, which excludes lakes, ponds, glaciers > 1 km^{2} (0.386 sq mi or 247 acres) and river estuaries.

Contes (French pronunciation: [kɔ̃t]; Occitan: Còntes; Italian: Conti) is a commune in the Alpes-Maritimes department in the region of Provence-Alpes-Côte d'Azur in south-eastern France.

Its inhabitants are Contois. Because the village sounds like the French word comte, the aristocratic title count, it called itself Pointe-Libre during the revolutionary period.

Famous sons of Contes are Henri Charpentier, a chef who studied under Escoffier, Camous and Ritz. He worked for some of the most famous restaurants in Paris and then emigrated to the United States where he would open restaurants in New York and Los Angeles. The other, Humbert Ricolfi was actually a classmate of Charpentier and went on to become Minister of Finance for the Republique. He financed the Maginot Line and is remembered as an upholder of the great ideals of the French Republique.

It was probably mentioned in an ancient inscription DEO EGOMONI CVNTINO VIC CVN P.

== Geography ==
Contes is a 7.52-square-mile (19.5 km^{2}) commune in the Southeast of France. It is located on Paillon valley, between 130 and 480 metres AMSL (430–1580 ft). The inhabitants live mainly in the village, but also in hamlets like Sclos, La Vernéa, La Pointe.

== Population ==
Historical population

Year	Pop.	±% p.a.
1793	1,442	—
1800	1,474	+0.31%
1806	1,426	−0.55%
1822	1,838	+1.60%
1838	1,861	+0.08%
1848	1,904	+0.23%
1858	1,930	+0.14%
1861	1,707	−4.01%
1866	1,748	+0.48%
1872	1,560	−1.88%
1876	1,588	+0.45%
1881	1,681	+1.14%
1886	1,655	−0.31%
1891	1,634	−0.26%
1896	1,688	+0.65%
1901	1,653	−0.42%
1906	1,716	+0.75%

Year	Pop.	±% p.a.
1911	1,911	+2.18%
1921	2,013	+0.52%
1926	2,524	+4.63%
1931	2,752	+1.74%
1936	2,717	−0.26%
1946	2,003	−3.00%
1954	2,366	+2.10%
1962	2,876	+2.47%
1968	3,458	+3.12%
1975	4,123	+2.54%
1982	4,941	+2.62%
1990	5,867	+2.17%
1999	6,551	+1.23%
2007	6,868	+0.59%
2012	7,187	+0.91%
2017	7,424	+0.65%
2023	7,897	+1.03%

Source: EHESS and INSEE (1968-2023)

== Economy ==
Formerly a rural community, with olive, vineyard and cattle-based economy, it has converted in a secondary town with services activities and residential areas for people working in the 15 km (9.3 mi) far city of Nice. The town has an important Lafarge plaster factory.

== See also ==
- Communes of the Alpes-Maritimes department
