= Bendejun =

Commune in Provence-Alpes-Côte d'Azur, France

- Commune
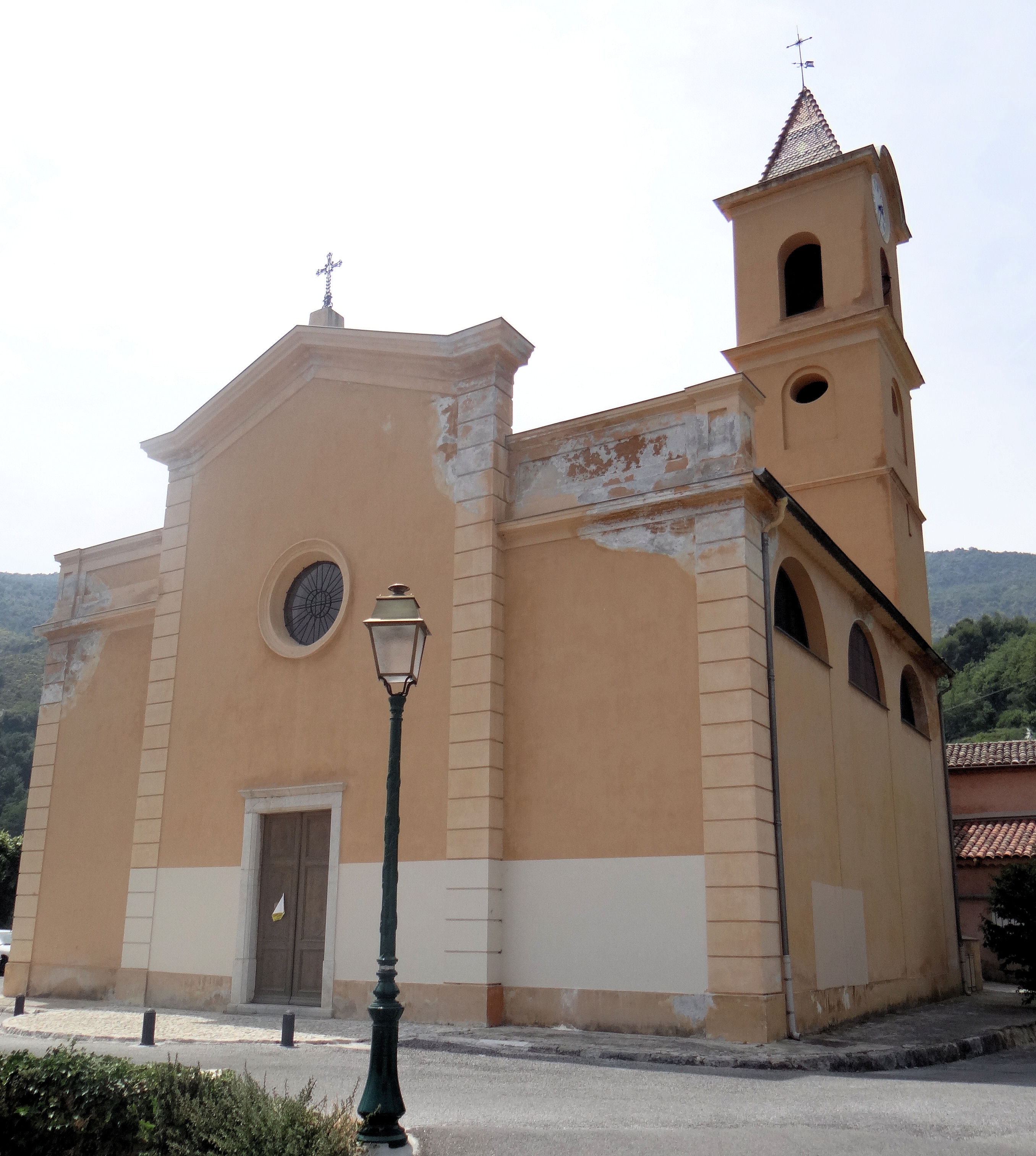
- The front of the church of Notre-Dame-du-Rosaire, in Bendejun

- Coat of arms
- Location of Bendejun
- Location within France Location within Provence-Alpes-Côte d'Azur
- Coordinates: 43°50′17″N 7°17′27″E
- Country: France
- Region: Provence-Alpes-Côte d'Azur
- Department: Alpes-Maritimes
- Arrondissement: Nice
- Canton: Contes
- Intercommunality: Pays des Paillons

Government
  - Mayor (2026–32): Christine Beille
- Area^{1}: 6.35 km^{2} (2.45 sq mi)
- Elevation: 400 m (1,300 ft)
- Highest elevation: 1,100 m (3,600 ft)
- Lowest elevation: 240 m (790 ft)
- Population (2023): 971
  - Density: 153/km^{2} (396/sq mi)
- Time zone: UTC+01:00 (CET)
  - Summer (DST): UTC+02:00 (CEST)
- INSEE/Postal code: 06014 /06390
- ^{1} French Land Register data, which excludes lakes, ponds, glaciers > 1 km^{2} (0.386 sq mi or 247 acres) and river estuaries.

Bendejun (French pronunciation: [bɛ̃deʒœ̃]; Italian: Bendigiuno) is a commune in the Alpes-Maritimes department in southeastern France.

== Population ==
Historical population
Year	Pop.	±% p.a.
1968	360	—
1975	396	+1.37%
1982	600	+6.12%
1990	763	+3.05%
1999	843	+1.11%
2007	899	+0.81%
2012	949	+1.09%
2017	952	+0.06%
2023	971	+0.33%
Source: INSEE

== See also ==
- Communes of the Alpes-Maritimes department
