= Cantaron =

- Commune
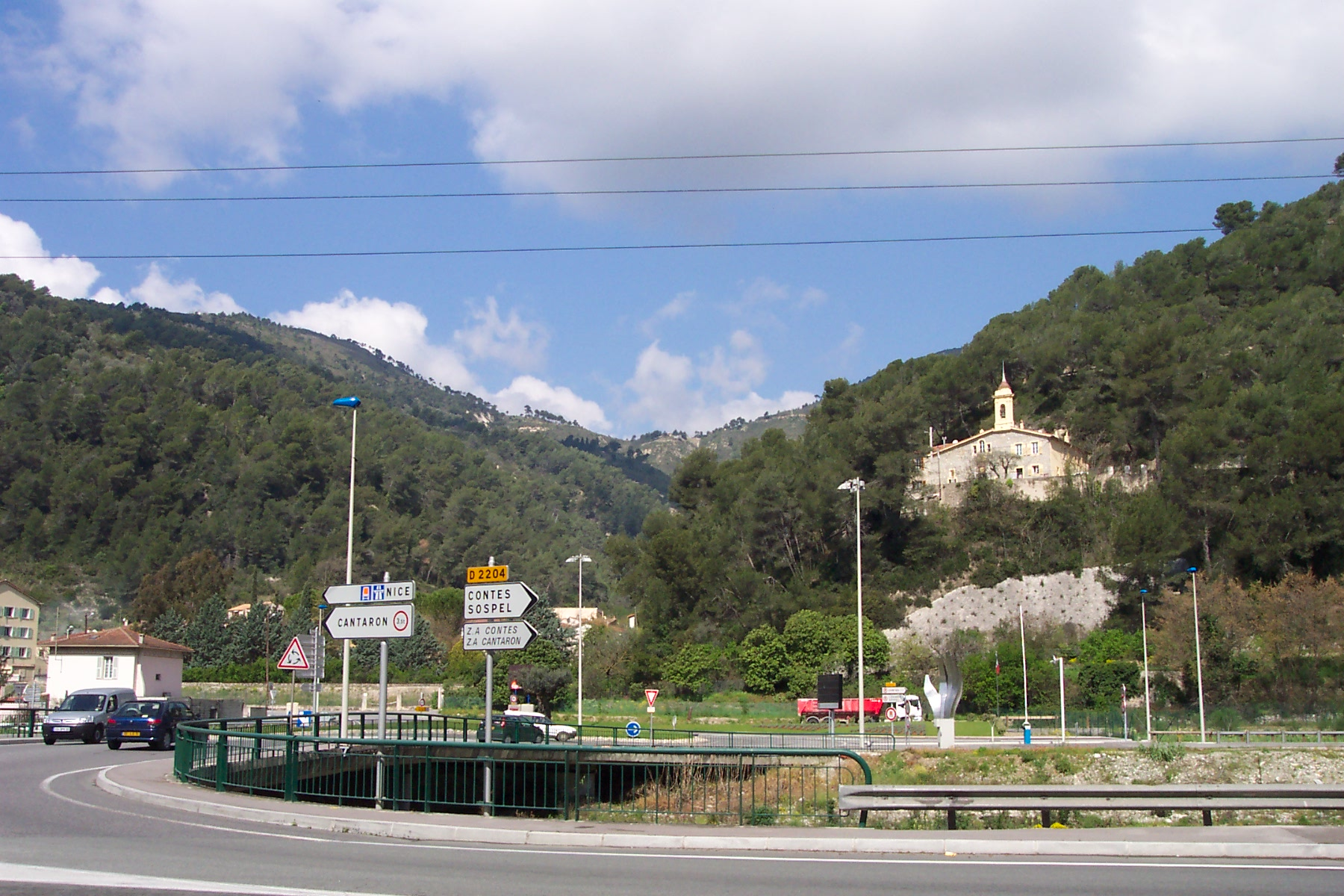
- The church and the cemetery on the right, the village is on the left

- Coat of arms
- Location of Cantaron
- Location within France Location within Provence-Alpes-Côte d'Azur
- Coordinates: 43°45′46″N 7°19′09″E
- Country: France
- Region: Provence-Alpes-Côte d'Azur
- Department: Alpes-Maritimes
- Arrondissement: Nice
- Canton: Contes
- Intercommunality: Pays des Paillons

Government
  - Mayor (2026–32): Gérard Branda
- Area^{1}: 7.38 km^{2} (2.85 sq mi)
- Elevation: 100 m (330 ft)
- Highest elevation: 780 m (2,560 ft)
- Lowest elevation: 90 m (300 ft)
- Population (2023): 1,268
  - Density: 172/km^{2} (445/sq mi)
- Demonym: Cantaronnais
- Time zone: UTC+01:00 (CET)
  - Summer (DST): UTC+02:00 (CEST)
- INSEE/Postal code: 06031 /06340
- ^{1} French Land Register data, which excludes lakes, ponds, glaciers > 1 km^{2} (0.386 sq mi or 247 acres) and river estuaries.

Cantaron (French pronunciation: [kɑ̃taʁɔ̃]; Occitan: Cantèron; Italian: Cantarone) is a commune in the Alpes-Maritimes department in southeastern France.

== Population ==
Historical population
Year	Pop.	±% p.a.
1968	539	—
1975	774	+5.31%
1982	956	+3.06%
1990	1,233	+3.23%
1999	1,258	+0.22%
2007	1,175	−0.85%
2012	1,337	+2.62%
2017	1,306	−0.47%
2023	1,268	−0.49%
Source: INSEE

== See also ==
- Communes of the Alpes-Maritimes department
