= Iznogoud =

French comic book series

- Main character with the series logo

Publication information
- Publisher: Dargaud, BD'Star, Éditions Tabary
- Format: Ongoing series
- Genre: Adventure comics
- Publication date: 1962
- No. of issues: 32

Creative team
- Created by: René Goscinny
- Written by: René Goscinny, Jean Tabary
- Artist(s): Jean Tabary, Nicolas Tabary, Elric

Iznogoud (French pronunciation: [iznoɡud]; from "he's no good" pronounced with a French accent) is a French comics series featuring an eponymous character, created by the comics writer René Goscinny and comics artist Jean Tabary. The comic series chronicles the life and times of Iznogoud, the Grand Vizier of the Caliphate of Baghdad at an undefined period. His greatest desire is to dethrone the Caliph and replace him, leading him to repeatedly utter the phrase "I want to be Caliph instead of the Caliph" –– a phrase that has been adopted in French and some other European languages to characterize overly ambitious people. Iznogoud is supported by his dimwitted yet faithful servant, Dilat Laraht (from French "dilate la rate", literally "dilates the spleen", an old idiom meaning "causes one to burst out laughing"), rendered in English as Wa'at Alahf (from "what a laugh").

After the death of Goscinny in 1977 Tabary continued with writing the character. The stories have been translated into several languages, including English, and the title has been adapted to animated and live-action film.

So far 30 graphic novels featuring Iznogoud have been published in French, with at least 26 of those published in English and a number of other languages. In 1974-1979, and again since 2021, Iznogoud also ran as a political-satirical newspaper comic, L'Ignoble Iznogoud Commente L'Actualité, with jokes referring directly to French politics and current events. Iznogoud was also adapted into a cartoon series produced by Saban Entertainment, with 52 episodes to its name, again with most of them having been translated to other languages as well.

== Publication history ==
The series made its debut in the Franco-Belgian comics magazine Record on 15 January 1962 under the title, Les aventures du Calife Haroun el Poussah. It was eventually recognised that the wicked supporting character ought to be the focus of the strip, and it was renamed Iznogoud. In 1968, it resumed serial publication in Goscinny's Pilote magazine.

Goscinny's taste for sharp satirical writing keeps the repetitive format of the stories constantly fresh, making Iznogoud one of the most popular villains in the French comic strip world. Goscinny's skill with puns, made famous in Astérix, is also evident in Iznogoud. Most of the puns in the original French make little sense if translated directly into English, requiring of translators (Anthea Bell and Derek Hockridge in the case of the English translations) to find creative solutions for equivalent puns while still keeping within the spirit of the original text.

When Goscinny died in 1977, Tabary eventually decided to carry on the work himself, just as Albert Uderzo did with Asterix. While the Goscinny period was characterized by "albums" comprising several short-length tales each, Tabary turned the series in a new direction, by dedicating every new album entirely to a single story, larger and much more detailed, usually revolving around a new unique concept.

In 1987 a game was produced by Infogrames entitled Iznogoud. The series was adapted to animated film in 1995 with a cartoon TV series, where the caliph is referred to as a sultan. A live-action Iznogoud film starring Michaël Youn and Jacques Villeret, Iznogoud: Calife à la place du calife, was released in France in February 2005.

The publisher Cinebook Ltd is currently publishing English language translations of the books in the Iznogoud series. The first book in the series, "The Wicked Wiles of Iznogoud", was published in March 2008. Further volumes continue to appear at approximately six month intervals. In India, Euro Books published the English versions of 12 Iznogoud titles in 2009.

== Synopsis ==
Iznogoud is Grand Vizier to the Caliph of Baghdad, Haroun El Poussah (Haroun al Plassid in English, a pun on the historical Caliph, Harun al-Rashid; poussah is roughly translated as "oaf", while Plassid is a phonetic version of placid, meaning calm or peaceful). His sole aim in life is to overthrow the Caliph and take his place. This is frequently expressed in his famous catchphrase, "I want to be Caliph instead of the Caliph" (je veux être calife à la place du calife), which has passed into everyday French for qualifying over-ambitious people who want to become chief. Iznogoud is always assisted in his plans by his faithful but dimwitted henchman, Dilat Larath (Wa'at Alahf in English; se dilater la rate meaning "to have a good laugh").

=== Supporting characters ===
Goscinny and Tabary occasionally make appearances themselves. In one episode, Tabary uses a magical time-travelling closet to help Iznogoud seize the Caliph title. In another episode, Iznogoud gets a magical calendar that lets him travel in time when he rips off its pages. He rips too many and he is transported to the 20th century, inside the studio of Tabary. In another episode, Iznogoud gets a magical drawing paper set that makes anybody or anything drawn on it disappear once the paper is torn apart. Unfortunately, the drawing needs to be realistic, and Iznogoud is a poor artist. In search of an art teacher, he meets Tabary, renamed Tabary El-Retard (retard meaning "delay").

There are occasionally "behind-the-scenes" moments, as when Iznogoud travels in a country in a mirror, and all is reversed, including text in balloons. Tabary is shown complaining to Goscinny about going through this frustrating "reversal" work, and even threatens him with a gun, to convince him into making a non-reversed "translated" version. They also appear debating after a contemporary crowd demands that they make Iznogoud caliph.

Other recurring characters include Sultan Pullmankar (Sultan Streetcar in English), the Caliph's neighbour who is described as a touchy man with a powerful army. Iznogoud often tries to provoke Pullmankar to become angry at the Caliph, in order to instigate a war. However, Pullmankar never gets angry with the caliph, only with Iznogoud.

The crew of Redbeard, another comics series published in Pilote, appears in A Carrot for Iznogoud, as it did in many stories of René Goscinny's most famous creation Asterix.

== Bibliography ==
1. Le Grand Vizir Iznogoud (1966, Dargaud) - Translated into English as The Grand Vizier Iznogoud (2012, Cinebook UK)
2. Les Complots du Grand Vizir Iznogoud (1967, Dargaud) - Translated into English as The Wicked Wiles of Iznogoud (2008, Cinebook UK)
3. Les Vacances du Calife (1968, Dargaud) - Translated into English as The Caliph’s Vacation (2008, Cinebook UK)
4. Iznogoud l'infâme (1969, Dargaud) - Translated into English as Iznogoud the Infamous (2011, Cinebook UK)
5. Des Astres pour Iznogoud (1969, Dargaud) - Translated into English as Iznogoud Rockets to Stardom (2011, Cinebook UK)
6. Iznogoud et l'ordinateur Magique (1970, Dargaud) - Translated into English as Iznogoud and the Magic Computer (2009, Cinebook UK)
7. Une Carotte pour Iznogoud (1971, Dargaud) - Translated into English as A Carrot for Iznogoud (2010, Cinebook UK)
8. Le Jour des Fous (1972, Dargaud) - Translated into English as Iznogoud and the Day of Misrule (2009, Cinebook UK)
9. Le Tapis Magique (1973, Dargaud) - Translated into English as Iznogoud and the Magic Carpet (2010, Cinebook UK)
10. Iznogoud l'acharné (1974, Dargaud) - Translated into English as Iznogoud the Relentless (2013, Cinebook UK)
11. La Tête de Turc d'Iznogoud (1975, Dargaud) - Translated into English as Iznogoud and the Jigsaw Turk (2014, Cinebook UK)
12. Le Conte de Fées d'Iznogoud (1976, Dargaud) - Translated into English as Iznogoud’s Fairy Tale (2015, Cinebook UK)
13. Je veux être Calife à la place du Calife (1978, BD Star) - Translated into English as I Want to be Caliph Instead of the Caliph (2016, Cinebook UK)
14. Les Cauchemars d'Iznogoud, Tome 1 (1979, Editions de la Séguinière) - Translated into English as Iznogoud’s Nightmares (2017, Cinebook UK)
15. L'enfance d'Iznogoud (1981, Glénat)
16. Iznogoud et les Femmes (1983, Editions de la Séguinière) - Translated into English as Iznogoud and the Women (2009, Euro Books India)
17. Les Cauchemars d'Iznogoud, Tome 4 (1984, Editions de la Séguinière) - Translated into English as Some More Nightmares of Iznogoud (2009, Euro Books India)
18. Le Complice d'Iznogoud (1985, Editions de la Séguinière) - Translated into English as The Accomplice of Iznogoud (2009, Euro Books India)
19. L'anniversaire d'Iznogoud (1987, Editions de la Séguinière) - Translated into English as The Nightmarish Birthday of Iznogoud (2009, Euro Books India)
20. Enfin Calife! (1989, Éditions Tabary) - Translated into English as Caliph at Last! (2009, Euro Books India)
21. Le Piège de la Sirène (1992, Éditions Tabary) - Translated into English as The Trap of the Siren (2009, Euro Books India)
22. Les Cauchemars d'Iznogoud, Tome 2 (1994, Éditions Tabary) - Translated into English as The Nightmares of Iznogoud (2009, Euro Books India)
23. Les Cauchemars d'Iznogoud, Tome 3 (1994, Éditions Tabary) - Translated into English as More Nightmares of Iznogoud (2009, Euro Books India)
24. Les Retours d'Iznogoud (1994, Éditions Tabary) - Translated into English as The Returns of Iznogoud (2009, Euro Books India)
25. Qui a tué le Calife? (1998, Éditions Tabary) - Translated into English as Who Killed the Caliph? (2009, Euro Books India)
26. Un Monstre Sympathique (2000, Éditions Tabary) - Translated into English as A Likeable Monster (2009, Euro Books India)
27. La Faute de l'ancêtre (2004, Éditions Tabary) - Translated into English as The Ancestor's Mistake (2009, Euro Books India)
28. Les Mille et Une Nuits du Calife (2008, Éditions Tabary)
29. Iznogoud Président (2012, IMAV Éditions)
30. De Père en Fils (2015, IMAV Éditions)
31. Moi, Calife... (2021, IMAV Éditions)
32. Des Βougies pour Iznogoud (2022, IMAV Éditions)

=== English translations ===
Title	Original Publication Date	English Publications
Iznogoud on Holiday / The Caliph's Vacation	1968	Egmont/Methuen - 1977
Iznogoud on Holiday / The Caliph's Vacation	1968	Dargaud International - 1982 - (US version)
Iznogoud on Holiday / The Caliph's Vacation	1968	Cinebook - (Book # 2) August 2008 ISBN 978-1-905460-61-8
Iznogoud the Infamous	1969	Egmont/Methuen - 1977
Iznogoud the Infamous	1969	Cinebook - (Book # 7) March 2011 ISBN 978-1-84918-074-0
The Wicked Wiles of Iznogoud	1967	Egmont/Methuen - 1978
The Wicked Wiles of Iznogoud	1967	Iznogoud Monthly Comic 1, Phoenix Press Ltd. - March 1996 (includes Kismet, Mesmer-eyesed, The Occidental Philtre, and The Time Machine. Excludes The Picnic and Chop and Change)
The Wicked Wiles of Iznogoud	1967	Iznogoud Monthly Comic 3, Phoenix Press Ltd. - May 1996 (includes The Picnic and Chop and Change)
The Wicked Wiles of Iznogoud	1967	Cinebook - (Book # 1) March 2008 ISBN 978-1-905460-46-5
Iznogoud and the Magic Computer	1970	Egmont/Methuen - 1978
Iznogoud and the Magic Computer	1970	Cinebook - (Book # 4) August 2009 ISBN 978-1-84918-000-9
Iznogoud and the Day of Misrule	1972	Egmont - 1979
Iznogoud and the Day of Misrule	1972	Cinebook - (Book # 3) March 2009 ISBN 978-1-905460-79-3
A Carrot for Iznogoud	1971	Egmont - 1979
A Carrot for Iznogoud	1971	Cinebook - (Book # 5) March 2010 ISBN 978-1-84918-021-4
Iznogoud Rockets to Stardom	1969	Egmont - 1980
Iznogoud Rockets to Stardom	1969	Cinebook - (Book # 8) August 2011 ISBN 978-1-84918-092-4
Iznogoud and the Magic Carpet	1973	Egmont - 1980
Iznogoud and the Magic Carpet	1973	Iznogoud Monthly Comic 2, Phoenix Press Ltd. - Apr 1996 (Includes The Magic Carpet, The Tiger Hunt, and The Box of Souvenirs. Excludes Incogneto)
Iznogoud and the Magic Carpet	1973	Iznogoud Monthly Comic 3, Phoenix Press Ltd. - May 1996 (includes Incogneto)
Iznogoud and the Magic Carpet	1973	Cinebook - (Book # 6) August 2010 ISBN 978-1-84918-044-3
The Grand Vizier Iznogoud	1966	Cinebook - (Book # 9) August 2012 ISBN 978-1-84918-131-0
Iznogoud the Relentless	1974	Cinebook - (Book # 10) July 2013 ISBN 978-1-84918-181-5
Iznogoud and the Jigsaw Turk	1975	Cinebook - (Book # 11) August 2014
Iznogoud's Fairy Tale	1976	Cinebook - (Book # 12) August 2015
I want to be Caliph instead of the Caliph	1978	Cinebook - (Book # 13) August 2016
Iznogoud's Nightmares	1979	Cinebook - (Book # 14) August 2017

== Animated series ==
Iznogoud
- Also known as: Saban's Iznogoud
- Genre: Animated comedy
- Created by: René Goscinny; Jean Tabary
- Voices of: Gérard Hernandez; Henri Guybet; Luq Hamet; Bernard Tiphaine; Steve Kramer; Reed Waxman
- Music by: Haim Saban; Shuki Levy; (as Michel Dax)
- Opening theme: "Iznogoud" by Alain Garcia and Michel Dax
- Country of origin: France
- Original languages: French; English
- No. of seasons: 1
- No. of episodes: 52

Production
- Running time: 11 minutes
- Production companies: Saban Entertainment; Saban International Paris; P.I.A. S.A.

Original release
- Network: France 2
- Release: 13 October – 16 November 1995

An animated series based on the comics was produced by Saban International Paris. The series began airing on Canal+ on October 11, 1996, and ran until March 16, 1997, with reruns airing on France 2 around that time. Ownership of the series passed to Disney in 2001 when Disney acquired Fox Kids Worldwide, which also includes Saban Entertainment; however, it never aired in the United States and the series is not available on Disney+.

=== Episodes ===
#	Title	Summary
1	The Hideaway Bed	Iznogoud purchases a Chippendale styled magic Hideaway Bed hoping to make the Sultan vanish, but the plan is interrupted by a visit from a foreign ambassador and a drink of Turkish coffee. In the end, it is Iznogoud who lies down on the bed and vanishes.
2	Hat's Off!	Iznogoud seeks an opportunity at a party in the Sultan's honour to make the Sultan look like a lunatic with a loony hat, but his plan is waylaid by the party show. Inevitably, Iznogoud ends up wearing the hat himself and going insane.
3	The Magic Catalogue	The Wizard Avaz repays Iznogoud with a magic catalogue capable of getting three objects from the future. Iznogoud misses out on the dangerous weapons and instead orders three useless items.
4	Hopping Back to the Future	Iznogoud hires the Wizard De Jacqual to scrawl a hop scotch which would age regress the Sultan, but so many people go on the hop scotch turning into squabbling children, including Iznogoud himself.
5	Iznogoud's Unlucky Star	Iznogoud gets his hands on a rocket ship and tries to launch the Sultan into space, but the moody rocket ship does not blast off. Iznogoud, devastated, puts the rocket away into storage. But one day it blasts off, tears through the royal palace, and takes Iznogoud with it.
6	Iznogoud's Student	Sultan Streetcar sends his son, Prince Sidecar, to Iznogoud's in order to give him an education. Iznogoud decides to make his pupil's life miserable so that he will complain to his father, who in turn will wage a war that will depose the Sultan. Sidecar foils this plan with a genie who answers all of Iznogoud's questions correctly, but when Iznogoud mentions wanting to be Sultan instead of the Sultan, Sidecar is intrigued, and Iznogoud teaches him all about overthrowing a ruler. After Prince Sidecar leaves, the furious Sultan Streetcar shows up a few days later after Iznogoud's head - his son has overthrown him!
7	Big Eyes	Iznogoud hires hypnotist De Giallo to persuade the Sultan that he is a donkey, but the spell is repeatedly broken by people clapping. De Giallo, tired of waiting for his payment, convinces Iznogoud he's a deaf rattlesnake, so that clapping can't snap him out of it.
8	The Time Machine	Adulahf finds a scientist lost in time and Iznogoud gets him to build a time machine to put the Sultan in the past. Iznogoud and Adulahf tangle with a cave man and get trapped in the past after the scientist suddenly returns to his own time.
9	Croaking the Night Away	Iznogoud meets a prince who has been transformed into a frog; if a human kisses the frog, the frog is restored to human form while the kisser becomes a frog, while if the frog kisses a human, the human becomes a frog and the frog doesn't change. Iznogoud gets the Sultan to kiss the transformed prince, who then tries to take over the throne himself, but Iznogoud thwarts his plan by getting himself and the prince turned into frogs.
10	One for the Road	Iznogoud gets a disgusting green liquid to turn the Sultan into a woodlouse. He manages to trick the Sultan into repeatedly drinking the stuff, but when he faints, the Sultan gives him the last drop, and he turns into a woodlouse instead.
11	State Visit	Iznogoud accompanies the Sultan on a visit to Sultan Streetcar trying to start a scandal. When his attempts fail, he tries again when Sultan Streetcar makes a reciprocal state visit, but gets into trouble of his own.
12	The Mysterious Poster Hanger	Iznogoud tries to dispose of the Sultan in a poster that traps those who step inside. Iznogoud gets trapped along with Adulahf with no way out, while the Sultan is able to escape through a second poster unnoticed by Iznogoud.
13	The Pic-Nic	Iznogoud convinces the Sultan to join him in a picnic in hopes the Sultan will dehydrate. Whenever Iznogoud volunteers to get back to the palace to pick up some water he "forgot", someone appears selling some. The plan ultimately fails when it rains.
14	The Sultan's Double	Iznogoud is introduced to a merchant who looks like the Sultan (apart from a black eye Adulahf gave him). Fortunately, whenever Iznogoud tries to replace the Sultan with the look-alike, the Sultan has changed something about his looks, and when they finally do look identical, they meet and bond over their shared love of pétanque. Then the merchant's partner comes looking for him - and he looks exactly like Iznogoud!
15	The Western Potion	Iznogoud buys a potion that makes its drinkers so light they float away, but it must be drunk while hot; when cold, it has no effect, and when tepid, it merely causes hiccups. The Sultan lets his first cup go cold and blows on his second cup to cool it, so that when he and Iznogoud are set upon by bandits, it only remains hot for long enough for the Sultan to float away back to the palace, while the hiccuping vizier is captured.
16	The Genie	Iznogoud buys a magic pair of slippers that contains a genie, but keeps losing track of the slippers among dozens of identical pairs, so that he is the one who ends up transformed by the genie's magic when the Sultan mentions wanting him to be a star (at that night's party).
17	Goldfingers	Iznogoud requests Karat of the Black Mountains to come with him and turn the Sultan into a gold plated statue, but the plan backfires and gets Iznogoud turned into a statue.
18	Incognito	Iznogoud makes the sultan look like a tyrant in the city and lures him outside dressed as a beggar to overthrow him. Instead the Sultan changes the laws to suit the people and Iznogoud is arrested.
19	It's a Dog's Tune	A Chinese wizard sells Iznogoud a magic flute; one tune changes the listener into a dog, another changes them back. Iznogoud first uses the flute to turn the wizard and half of Baghdad into dogs, but when he is in front of the sultan, he forgets the tune. Ultimately, he is the one who is turned into a dog.
20	A Wonderful Machine	A magic salesman sells Iznogoud a magical device known as a "computer" that can answer any question. The vizier asks it how to become Sultan instead of the Sultan, while trying to delay the signing of a marriage contract between the Sultan's 37th son and Sultan Streetcar's 42nd daughter until he can get an answer. But the computer has no answer for him, and the signing goes ahead as planned.
21	The Curse of the Diamond	Iznogoud obtains a cursed diamond from a beggar to give to the Sultan as a birthday present, but the diamond's curse falls hard upon Iznogoud the moment he touches it.
22	Close Encounters of an Odd Kind	Iznogoud is met by an alien exploration team whom he hopes will dispose of the sultan with their zapper pistol, only to get zapped himself.
23	The Challenge	Iznogoud proposes a strong dimwitted porter to challenge the Sultan to a duel which would make Iznogoud the sultan if the Sultan is the loser (while the winner will be executed for attacking the Sultan). But as the fight begins, the Sultan unwittingly breaks a transformation spell on the porter, revealing "him" to be the long lost daughter of Sultan Streetcar, who is furious to discover that Iznogoud nearly got his daughter executed.
24	Slip Sliding in the Sultanate	Iznogoud seeks the help of the Magic Weatherman to produce snow to freeze the Sultan. Before Iznogoud can cause an avalanche on the Sultan the Magic Weatherman melts all the snow.
25	The Crazy Cruise	Iznogoud gets the Sultan to board the ship of an unlucky sailor, but he and Adulahf also come on the voyage. The trip from one island to another is ridiculous till Iznogoud turns into a seashell.
26	Watch Out! There's a Fly About	A group of Indians arrive to bring a gift to the Sultan. They give to Iznogoud a fly that stings its victim to a long sleep. The fly escapes and ends up as the Sultan's pet.
27	Giant's Island	A sailor named Cimbal tells Iznogoud of an island with giants, where Iznogoud hopes to dispose of the Sultan. The two giants send the Sultan back home and use Iznogoud and Adulahf as chess pieces.
28	Tall Tales	A strange man called Telltale, who can literally sniff out scandal wherever he goes, offers his services to Iznogoud. When he cannot sniff any scandal involving the Sultan, Iznogoud persuades him to plant a fake story about the Sultan having a forsaken child. Hundreds of people show up claiming to be the Sultan's child, and the Sultan adopts them all and ruins Iznogoud's plan.
29	Elections in the Sultanate	Today is election day and Iznogoud intends to become sultan with the help of Smart Alec the magician and a support team, but a rival group led by the yogi Iron-Nail are opposing. A revolt ruins Iznogoud's plans altogether.
30	The Wax Museum	Iznogoud visits a wax museum and persuades the owner to make some wax assassins alive to get the Sultan, but he has until 7 o'clock to do so. The assassins are uncooperative and Iznogoud fails to meet the deadline.
31	The Genie of the Mirror	A mirror genie called Inside-Out takes Iznogoud to a world where everything is the opposite. Iznogoud enjoys his stay until he realises the opposites are more against him than with him.
32	The Memory Potion	Iznogoud gets from a charm merchant a memory potion which requires the victim to smell it. Iznogoud's attempt to erase the Sultan's memory makes other people amnesiac and eventually himself.
33	Sweet Dreams	Iznogoud buys a magic amulet that makes the wearer's dreams come true, but none of the surreal dreams he has involve becoming Sultan instead of the Sultan. His henchman Adulahf has better luck when he puts on the amulet and finds himself Sultan.
34	A Fairy Tale	Iznogoud encounters an apprentice fairy and asks her to use her magic to turn him into the Sultan. Unfortunately, she turns the Sultan into a clone of Iznogoud instead, and then turns both Iznogouds back into Sultans. Her attempts to fix things just make them worse, until finally Iznogoud is cloned and turned into a pair of clothes irons.
35	Musical Chairs	A magician shows Iznogoud a magic bowl; when two people drink from it, they switch bodies. Iznogoud uses the bowl to switch bodies with the Sultan, whom he promptly imprisons, but his tyrannical rule leads him to be overthrown and replaced by the grand vizier (the Sultan in Iznogoud's body).
36	The Magic Puzzle	A joke shop owner sells Iznogoud a magic jigsaw puzzle which, when the last piece is put in, causes the object of the puzzler's thoughts to disintegrate into 10,000 pieces. However, a piece is missing, forcing Iznogoud to get a new one from the factory. Then the joke shop owner finds the original missing piece and delivers it to the Sultan, who says he's always thinking of Iznogoud as he puts the piece in and causes the vizier to disintegrate.
37	In the Summertime	Iznogoud drags the Sultan on a vacation to a seaside resort, where he tries various ways to get rid of him: swimming in shark-infested waters, burying him in the sand, sending him out in a boat in a storm. His attempts all fail, leaving him a nervous wreck whom the Sultan's doctor declares in need of a vacation.
38	The Sultan's Sceptre	The Sultan gets his power from a magic sceptre that he must retrieve and present to the people once a year; if he fails, he is executed. Iznogoud fetches a thief from the local jail to steal the sceptre. The thief reads through a dictionary to find the password to open the sceptre's chamber, but after stealing the sceptre, they accidentally leave the dictionary behind and, as they go back to retrieve the evidence of their crime, the ever unaware Sultan takes the sceptre. The thief leaves Iznogoud and Adulahf trapped in the chamber, unable to remember the password to get out.
39	The Sheikh's Potion	Iznogoud buys from Traveller Sheikh a potion to shrink the Sultan. His attempts get other things and people shrunk and finally himself.
40	Nuts' Day	On Nuts' Day, authorities and servants switch places, meaning Iznogoud is Sultan for a day, but his attempts to make the change permanent by enlisting help from a genie, Sultan Streetcar, and the local people all fail, and when the day ends, he is arrested as a runaway slave.
41	The Sultan's Portrait	Iznogoud buys a magic pencil and paper that will make anyone drawn on it disappear when the paper is torn in half. Unfortunately, his art skills are not good enough to trigger the spell until he takes art classes, and when he finally does produce a realistic portrait of the Sultan and tears it in half, he is unaware that his teacher has sketched him on the other side of the page.
42	The Mysterious Ointment	The sailor Iznotsobad brings Iznogoud a tube of toothpaste, an invention as yet unknown in the sultanate, that he (falsely) claims contains an undetectable poison. The grand vizier's attempts to get the Sultan to brush his teeth with it end with Iznogoud himself covered in the contents of the tube.
43	Iznogoud's Nest Eggs	A poor fisherman discovers an ostrich that lays golden eggs when sung a song, and Iznogoud plans to use the eggs to fund a mercenary campaign to overthrow the Sultan. However, his singing is so bad that it produces fool's gold eggs instead, and he is imprisoned for trying to scam the mercenary leader.
44	The Road to Nowhere	Iznogoud and Adulahf are riding out by camel when they meet a workman at a crossroads who claims he is responsible for maintaining a road to nowhere. The vizier, his henchman, and their camel head back to Baghdad to fetch the Sultan and send him on the road to get rid of him, only to discover they have taken the road to nowhere after a strange journey that leads them back to the crossroads.
45	The Invisible Threat	Iznogoud learns a magic spell that will turn its target invisible and tests it on Adulahf, but the target must hold still for the spell to work, repeatedly foiling Iznogoud's attempts to use it on the Sultan. When he tries to teach the spell to the invisible Adulahf to use against the Sultan, Adulahf turns Iznogoud invisible instead.
46	The Magic Carpet	An Indian fakir teaches Iznogoud a magic spell to send any carpet on a one-way journey to China, but Iznogoud keeps getting the spell wrong. Inevitably, he is the one who ends up going on a one-way carpet trip to China.
47	Magic Memories	A Japanese tourist sells Iznogoud a magic camera that traps people and things in its photographs. When Iznogoud tries to use it on the Sultan, he keeps trapping other people and things instead, culminating in trapping himself after accidentally taking a picture of his own reflection.
48	Souvenir's Island	While shopping for a gift for the Sultan's birthday, Iznogoud offends a vendor with his miserly haggling, so the vendor tricks him into listening to a seashell that sends him to an island of kitschy tourist souvenirs. The vizier and Adulahf end up trapped in a snow globe which the vendor presents to the Sultan.
49	The Maze	Iznogoud tries to trap the Sultan in a carnival maze in which all who enter get hopelessly lost, but the Sultan finds his way out after stepping in some paint and following his footprints back out. Iznogoud cleans up the footprints for another attempt and gets lost in the maze himself.
50	Mean Genie	Iznogoud enlists the services of a genie who can dissolve anyone who touches the water in which he lives, and he and Adulahf transport him by bucket back to Baghdad. However, a series of incidents reduces the amount of water available to a thimbleful, which Iznogoud touches when he prepares to mend a tear in his clothes.
51	The Tiger Hunter	Iznogoud takes the Sultan on a tiger hunt and tricks him into acting as bait in various traps. However, the traps fail to work as planned, and eventually Iznogoud and Adulahf end up stuck in a pit with a tiger while the Sultan returns home.
52	A Hairy Statuette	During the visit of an African king, Iznogoud buys a voodoo doll from the king's sorcerer that requires a hair of the intended victim to work. Inevitably, Iznogoud's attempts to get one of the Sultan's hairs all fail, and it is his own hair that ends up in the doll when it is thrown high into the air and falls to the ground.

== References in society ==
Notably, the character has also made his mark on French popular culture and public life. Wanting to become "Caliph in the Caliph's place" has become a popular expression in French, describing people perceived as over-ambitious. The Prix Iznogoud (Iznogoud Award) was created in 1992 and is given each year to "a personality who failed to take the Caliph's place", chosen among prominent French figures who have recently known spectacular failures. The award has been given to various personalities, amongst them Édouard Balladur (1995), Nicolas Sarkozy (1999) and Jean-Marie Messier (2002). The jury is headed by politician André Santini, who gave the award to himself after failing to become president of the Île-de-France in the 2004 regional elections.

== See also ==
- Franco-Belgian comics
- Marcinelle school

== Sources ==
- Le calife Haroun el Poussah / Iznogoud publications in Record Archived 14 June 2007 at the Wayback Machine and Pilote BDoubliées (in French)
- Iznogoud albums Bedetheque (in French)
