= Jean Tabary =

French comics artist

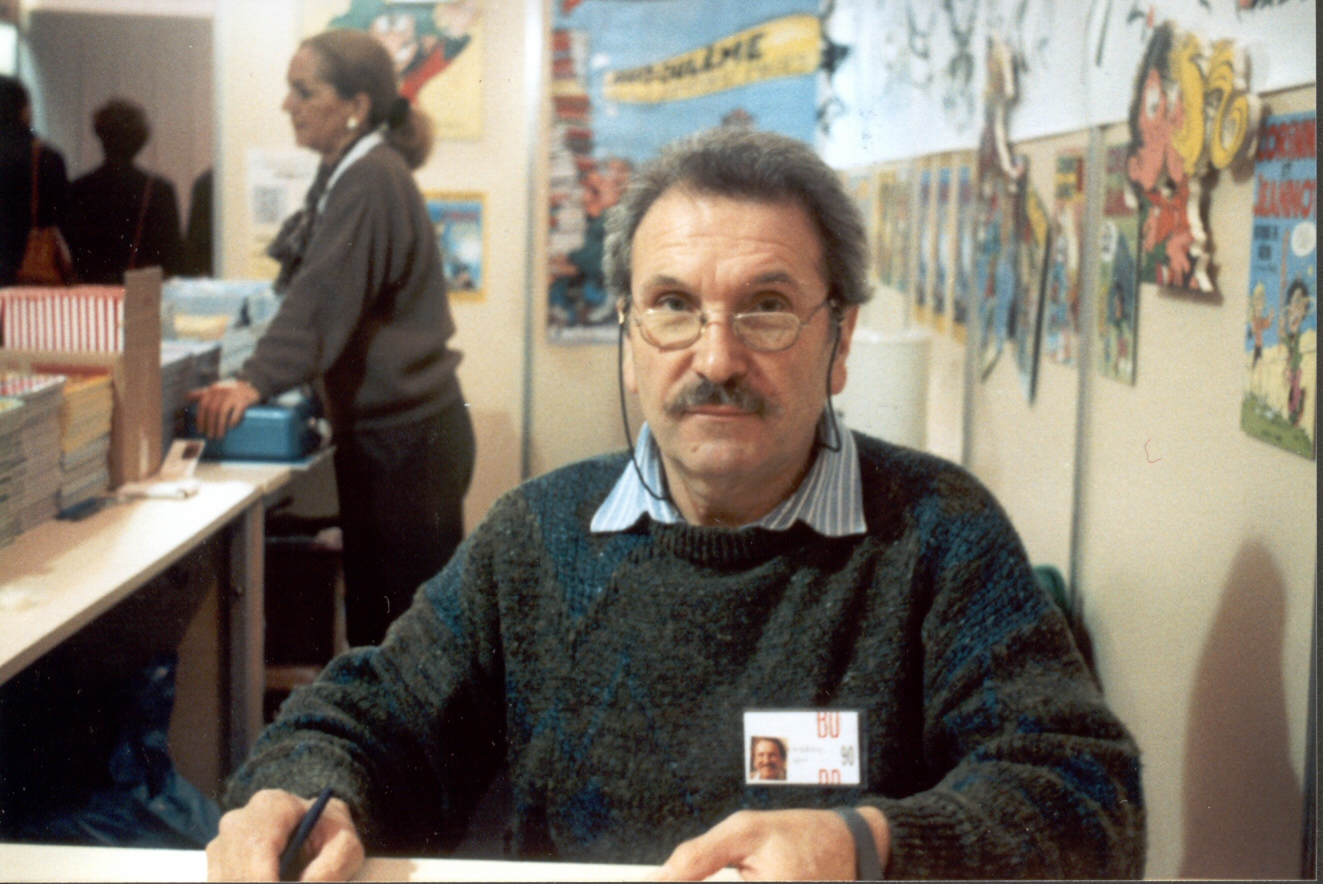
- Born: 5 March 1930 Stockholm, Sweden
- Died: 18 August 2011 (aged 81) Pont-l'Abbé-d'Arnoult, France
- Areas: artist, writer
- Notable works: Iznogoud; Totoche; Valentin le vagabond Corinne et Jeannot

Jean Tabary (5 March 1930 – 18 August 2011) was a French comics artist.

== Biography ==
Tabary was born in Stockholm and made his comics debut with Richard et Charlie published in the Franco-Belgian comics magazine Vaillant on 5 November 1956. For Vaillant (in 1965 renamed Pif) Tabary also drew Grabadu et Gabaliouchtou, and eventually the hit series Totoche in 1959, which produced another series with two of its characters, Corinne et Jeannot, and its own short-lived periodical Totoche Poche. Tabary continued to draw this series until 1976.

In 1962 Tabary began a long-lasting collaboration with René Goscinny, creating the series Les aventures du Calife Haroun el Poussah, first published in Record on 15 January 1962. Shifting its focus and title name to the evil protagonist/anti-hero of the series, Iznogoud became a considerable success, and was eventually adapted into a cartoon TV series. In 1968 the series changed serial publication magazine to Goscinny's Pilote magazine. Valentin le vagabond, another series Tabary initially created with Goscinny, also appeared in Pilote since 1962.

After Goscinny's death in 1977, Tabary continued to create Iznogoud albums. Tabary's own publishing label, at first named Editions de la Séguinière, then Éditions Tabary, continues to publish Tabary work, ultimately albums in the Corinne et Jeannot series, and the most recent Iznogoud volume, La faute de l'ancêtre in 2004.

== Bibliography ==
Series	Years	Magazine	Albums	Editor	Remarks
Richard et Charlie	1955–1962	Vaillant	1	Glénat	
Totoche	1959–2002	Vaillant and Pif	14	Vaillant and Dargaud	
Iznogoud	1962–2004	Record and Pilote magazine	27	Dargaud	Scenarios by René Goscinny until 1977
Valentin le vagabond	1962–1977	Pilote	7	Dargaud	Created with Goscinny
Corinne et Jeannot	1966–1999	Pif	7	Vaillant, Dargaud, Tabary	Spinoff to Totoche

== Sources ==
- Tabary publications in Vaillant and Pif, Pilote and Record BDoubliées (in French)
- Tabary albums Bedetheque (in French)

Footnotes
