= Blausasc =

Commune in Provence-Alpes-Côte d'Azur, France

- Commune
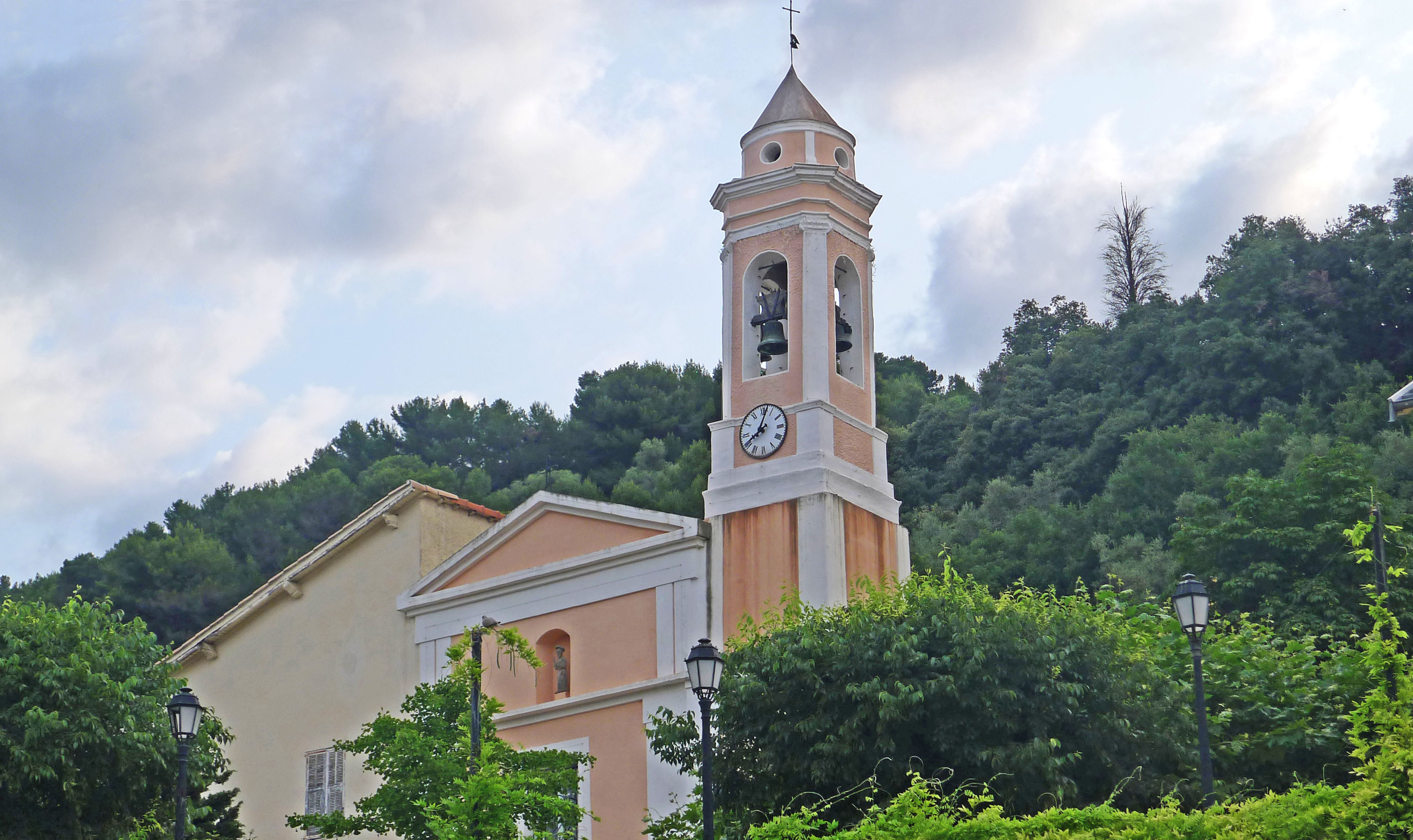
- The church of Blausasc

- Coat of arms
- Location of Blausasc
- Location within France Location within Provence-Alpes-Côte d'Azur
- Coordinates: 43°48′19″N 7°21′57″E
- Country: France
- Region: Provence-Alpes-Côte d'Azur
- Department: Alpes-Maritimes
- Arrondissement: Nice
- Canton: Contes
- Intercommunality: Pays des Paillons

Government
  - Mayor (2026–32): Michel Lottier
- Area^{1}: 10.21 km^{2} (3.94 sq mi)
- Elevation: 310 m (1,020 ft)
- Highest elevation: 661 m (2,169 ft)
- Lowest elevation: 108 m (354 ft)
- Population (2023): 1,668
  - Density: 163.4/km^{2} (423.1/sq mi)
- Demonym: Blausascois
- Time zone: UTC+01:00 (CET)
  - Summer (DST): UTC+02:00 (CEST)
- INSEE/Postal code: 06019 /06440
- ^{1} French Land Register data, which excludes lakes, ponds, glaciers > 1 km^{2} (0.386 sq mi or 247 acres) and river estuaries.

Blausasc (French pronunciation: [blozask]; Italian: Blausasco) is a commune in the Alpes-Maritimes department in southeastern France.

== Population ==
Historical population
Year	Pop.	±% p.a.
1968	509	—
1975	510	+0.03%
1982	725	+5.15%
1990	1,057	+4.83%
1999	1,254	+1.92%
2007	1,391	+1.30%
2012	1,468	+1.08%
2017	1,583	+1.52%
2023	1,668	+0.88%
Source: INSEE

== See also ==
- Communes of the Alpes-Maritimes department
