= Lucéram =

Commune in Provence-Alpes-Côte d'Azur, France

Lucéram Luceram (Occitan)
- Commune
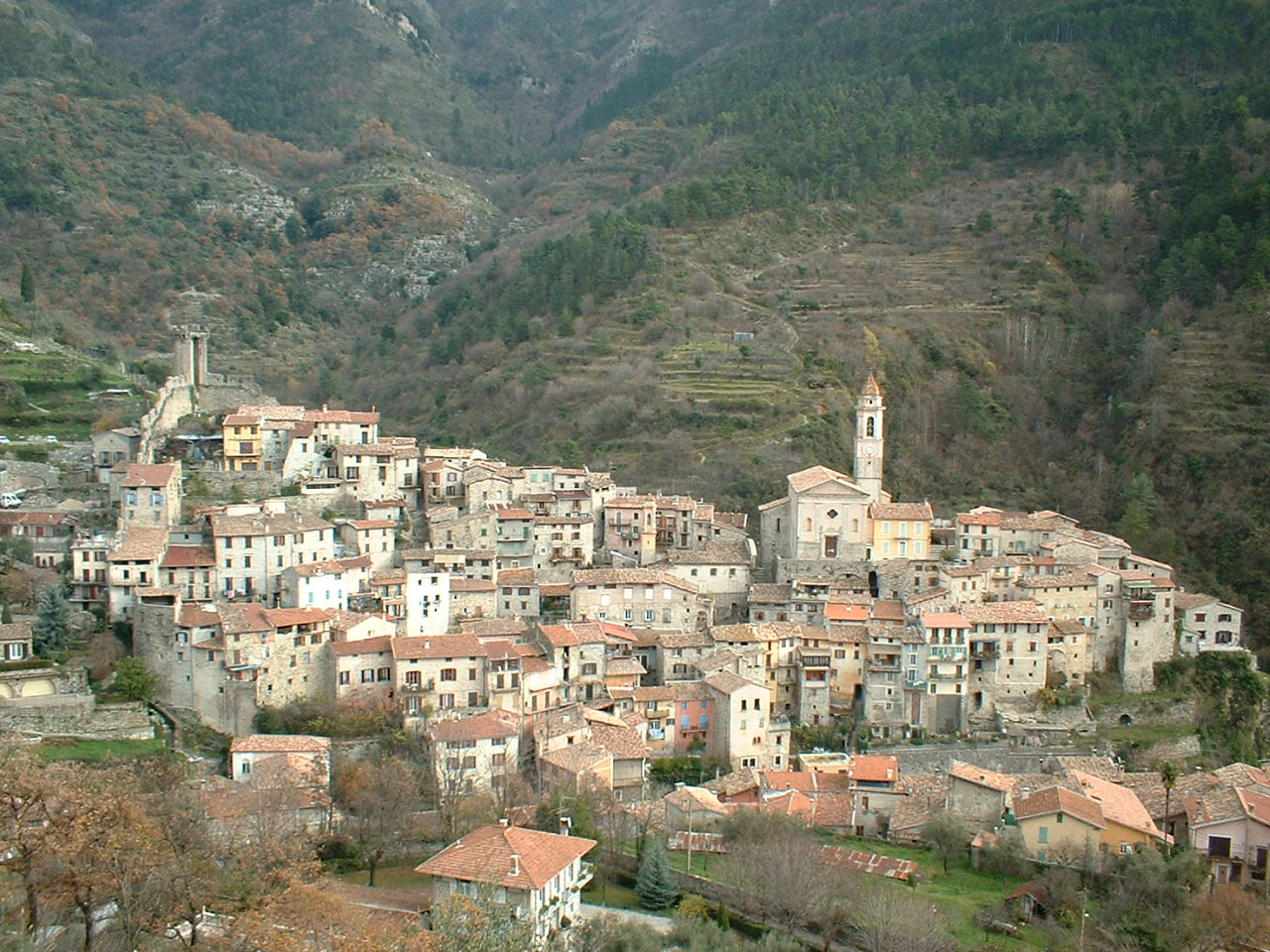
- View of Lucéram

- Coat of arms
- Location of Lucéram
- Location within France Location within Provence-Alpes-Côte d'Azur
- Coordinates: 43°53′00″N 7°21′41″E
- Country: France
- Region: Provence-Alpes-Côte d'Azur
- Department: Alpes-Maritimes
- Arrondissement: Nice
- Canton: Contes
- Intercommunality: Pays des Paillons

Government
  - Mayor (2026–32): Michel Calmet
- Area^{1}: 65.52 km^{2} (25.30 sq mi)
- Elevation: 660 m (2,170 ft)
- Highest elevation: 1,567 m (5,141 ft)
- Lowest elevation: 400 m (1,300 ft)
- Population (2023): 1,234
  - Density: 18.83/km^{2} (48.78/sq mi)
- Demonym: Lucéramois
- Time zone: UTC+01:00 (CET)
  - Summer (DST): UTC+02:00 (CEST)
- INSEE/Postal code: 06077 /06440
- ^{1} French Land Register data, which excludes lakes, ponds, glaciers > 1 km^{2} (0.386 sq mi or 247 acres) and river estuaries.

Lucéram (French pronunciation: [lyseʁam]; Italian: Lucerame, formerly; Occitan: Luceram) is a rural commune in the Alpes-Maritimes department in the southeastern Provence-Alpes-Côte d'Azur region in France.

The commune includes the mountain village and resort of Peïra-Cava, located north of Lucéram village. Established in 1909, it was the first winter sports resort in the department. Lucéram is also known for its medieval streets, religious heritage, and several altarpieces by the Renaissance painter Ludovico Brea.

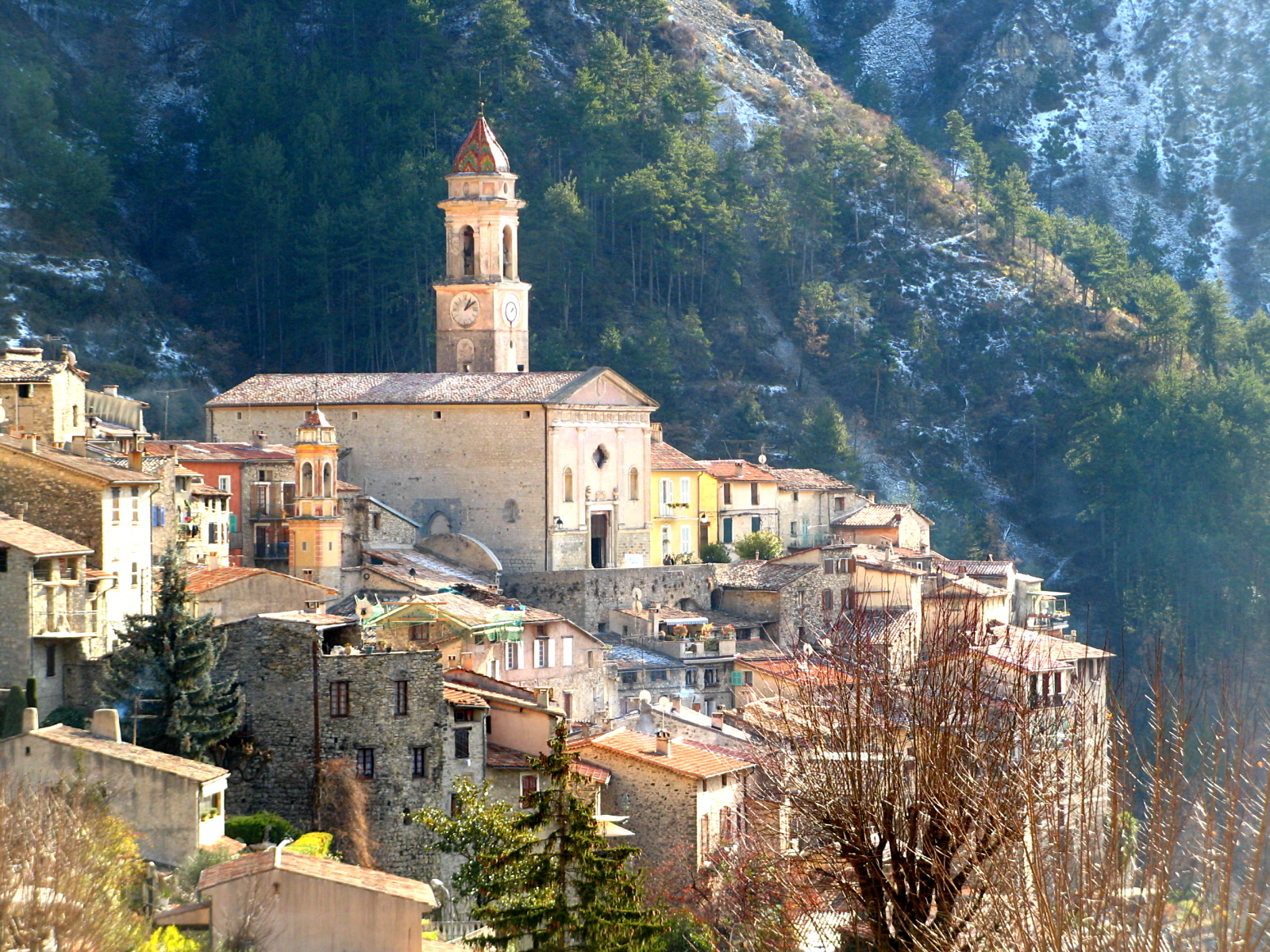
Lucéram in winter

== Geography ==
Lucéram is situated on a rocky outcrop overlooking the valley of the Paillon river, approximately 27 km northeast of Nice. The commune lies along the historic salt road linking Nice with the Vésubie Valley and inland Alpine regions.

The village stands at an altitude of around 650 m and is accessible via the D 2566 road. The commune ranges in elevation from 400 m to 1,567 m.

== Toponymy ==
The origin of the name Lucéram is uncertain.

One theory derives the name from Lucerius or Lucerus, possibly the name of a Benedictine monk. A form resembling Luceranus appears in texts dating from 1057.

Other proposed origins include the Latin phrases Lux eram ("I was light") and Lucus eram ("I was a sacred grove"), the latter possibly referring to the forests surrounding the village. Historical forms of the name include Lucis-ramus and Luciramus.

== History ==
Lucéram developed during the Middle Ages as a fortified hill settlement overlooking important trade routes between the coast and the Alps. The village preserves much of its medieval character, including narrow passageways, vaulted streets, and defensive architecture.

== Sights ==
Notable sites in Lucéram include:

- The Church of Saint Margaret (late 15th century), containing an altarpiece by Ludovico Brea
- A 13th-century Pietà
- Medieval gateways, vaulted alleys, and historic stone houses
- The nearby mountain resort village of Peïra-Cava

== Culture ==
Lucéram is known for its annual Christmas nativity display. During the festive season, hundreds of crèches (nativity scenes) are displayed throughout the village, including in windows, passageways, cellars, fountains, and other public spaces. The village is decorated with pine branches and red and gold ribbons.

== Demographics ==
Historical population
| Year | Pop. | ±% p.a. |
|---|---|---|
| 1968 | 630 | — |
| 1975 | 694 | +1.39% |
| 1982 | 889 | +3.60% |
| 1990 | 1,026 | +1.81% |
| 1999 | 1,035 | +0.10% |
| 2007 | 1,251 | +2.40% |
| 2012 | 1,215 | −0.58% |
| 2017 | 1,284 | +1.11% |
| 2023 | 1,234 | −0.66% |
Source: INSEE

Its inhabitants are known as Lucéramois (masculine) and Lucéramoises (feminine) in French.

== See also ==
- Communes of the Alpes-Maritimes department
