= Drap =

Commune in Provence-Alpes-Côte d'Azur, France

- Commune
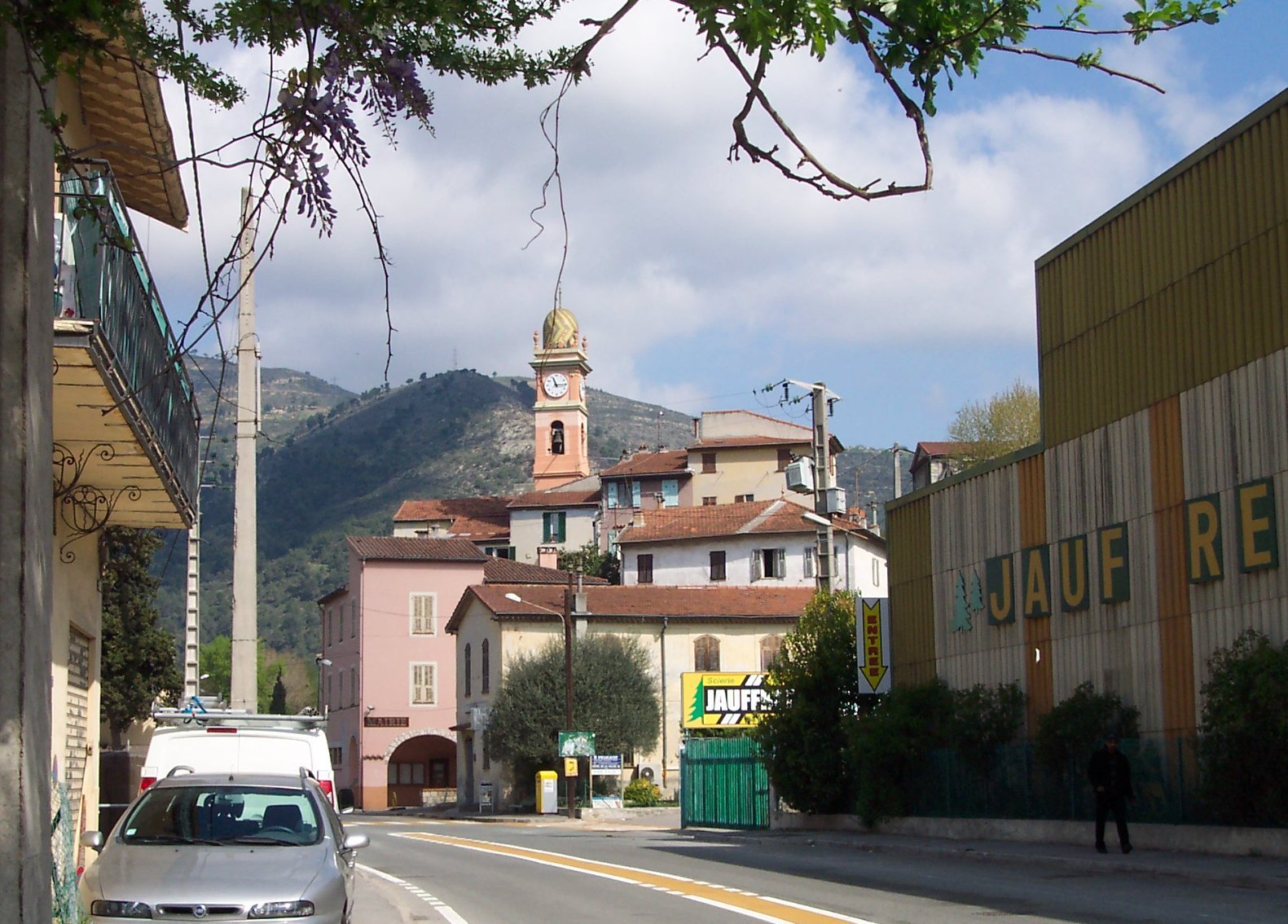
- The church and the village, seen from the road

- Coat of arms
- Location of Drap
- Location within France Location within Provence-Alpes-Côte d'Azur
- Coordinates: 43°45′21″N 7°19′19″E
- Country: France
- Region: Provence-Alpes-Côte d'Azur
- Department: Alpes-Maritimes
- Arrondissement: Nice
- Canton: Contes
- Intercommunality: Pays des Paillons

Government
  - Mayor (2026–32): Robert Nardelli
- Area^{1}: 5.54 km^{2} (2.14 sq mi)
- Elevation: 105 m (344 ft)
- Highest elevation: 520 m (1,710 ft)
- Lowest elevation: 75 m (246 ft)
- Population (2023): 5,484
  - Density: 990/km^{2} (2,560/sq mi)
- Time zone: UTC+01:00 (CET)
  - Summer (DST): UTC+02:00 (CEST)
- INSEE/Postal code: 06054 /06340
- ^{1} French Land Register data, which excludes lakes, ponds, glaciers > 1 km^{2} (0.386 sq mi or 247 acres) and river estuaries.

Drap (French pronunciation: [dʁap]; Italian: Drappo; Occitan: Fòlha) is a commune in the Alpes-Maritimes department in the Provence-Alpes-Côte d'Azur region of Southeastern France.

== Population ==
The inhabitants are called Drapois and Drapoises.

Historical population
Year	Pop.	±% p.a.
1968	1,551	—
1975	1,561	+0.09%
1982	3,042	+10.00%
1990	4,267	+4.32%
1999	4,332	+0.17%
2007	4,475	+0.41%
2012	4,341	−0.61%
2017	4,546	+0.93%
2023	5,484	+3.18%
Source: INSEE

== See also ==
- Communes of the Alpes-Maritimes department
