= Canavesio =

Canavesio is a surname. Notable people with the surname include:

- Giancarlo Canavesio (born 1968), Italian film producer, investment banker, and entrepreneur
- Giovanni Canavesio (before 1450–1500), Italian artist
- Robertino Canavesio (born 1993), Argentine footballer
