= Giovanni Carron =

First Duke of Buttigliera Alta

Giovanni Carron (ca. 1570 – 1649) was the First Duke of Buttigliera Alta. He was conferred the title as well as the fiefdom of the area, on April 25, 1619. His family, the Carrons, originated from Savoy, and established themselves in Turin in 1600, at the Lascaris Palace.

Giovanni had four children:

- Alessandro (whose only son died without leaving an heir);
- Nepumoceno;
- Costanza (married the marquese Massimo di Ceva and died childless);
- Celso, who was the father of Clementina Carron and Gerardo Carron. Clementina was the last of the Carron line.
