= Sant'Antonio di Ranverso Abbey =

Church in Turin, Italy

Coordinates: 45°4′52″N 7°26′58″E

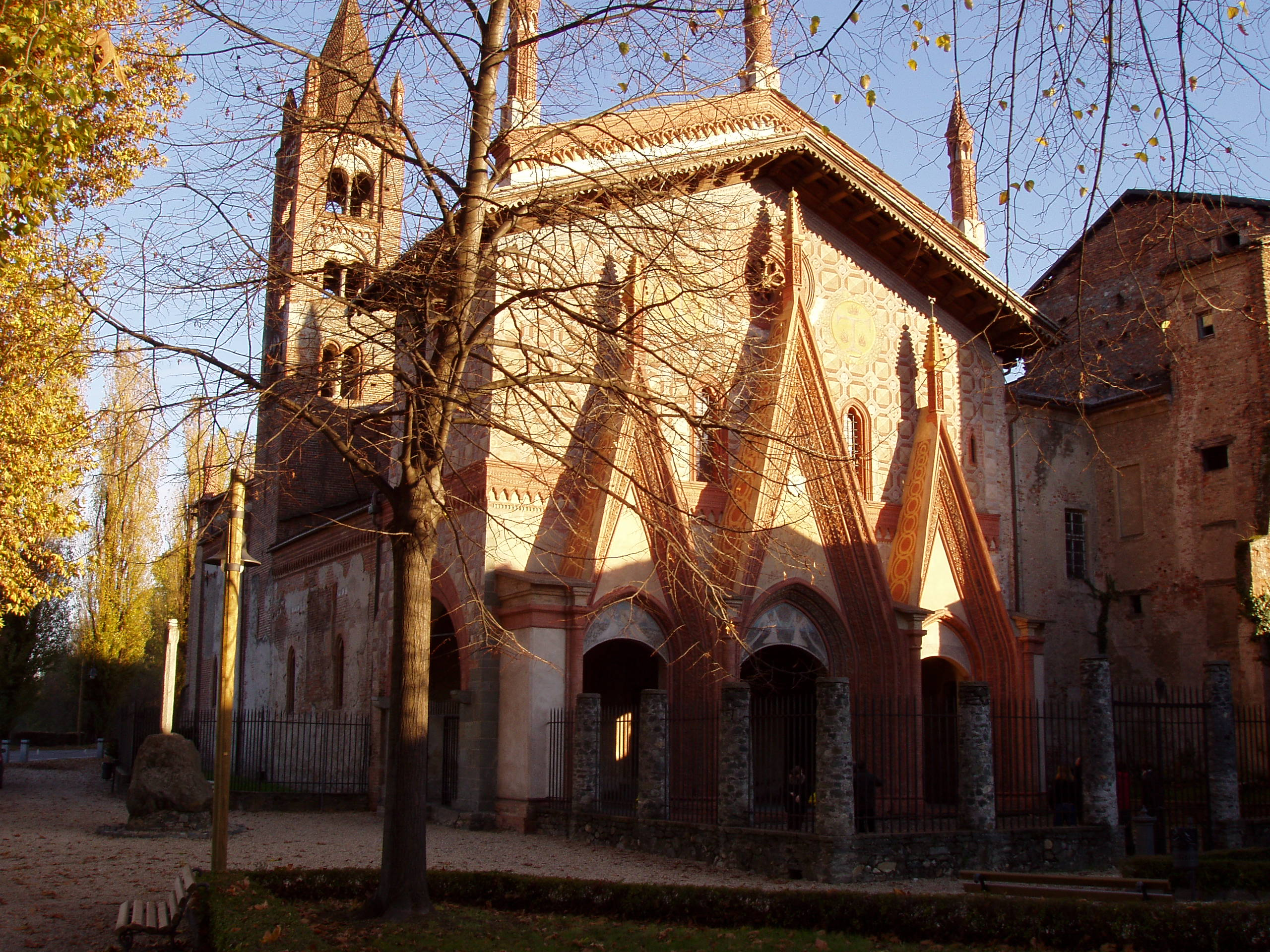
Façade.

The Abbey of Sant'Antonio di Ranverso is a religious complex at Buttigliera Alta, in the Metropolitan City of Turin, northern Italy.

== History ==
The monastery (also known as preceptory) complex was founded in 1188 by Humbert III of Savoy, who give it to the Regular Canons of St. Anthony of Vienne, as a restoration point for pilgrims and a treatment center for people infected by ergot. With the outbreak of the Black Death in the 15th century, the abbey also took care of the new contagium. St. Anthony was chosen due to its widespread depiction in company of a small pig, an animal whose fat was used for the treatment of the plague.

The complex was modified and rebuilt several times. It initially included a hospital, of which only the façade remain, the preceptory itself and the church. The latter appears today in Lombard-Gothic style, after its renovation in the 14th-15th centuries. Annexed to it is the bell tower, also in Gothic style (14th century).

The interior was decorated with numerous frescoes starting from the 13th century, some of which painted by Giacomo Jaquerio in the early 15th century. Also by him is the Ascension to the Calvary, in the sacristy. In the presbytery is a polyptych by Defendente Ferrari (1531).
