= Our Lady of the Fountains (La Brigue) =

Shrine in La Brigue, France

Coordinates: 44°03′44″N 7°39′15″E

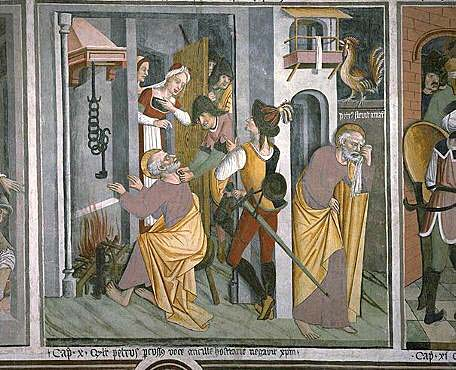
Denial of Peter from the cycle of Passion at Our Lady of the Fountains.

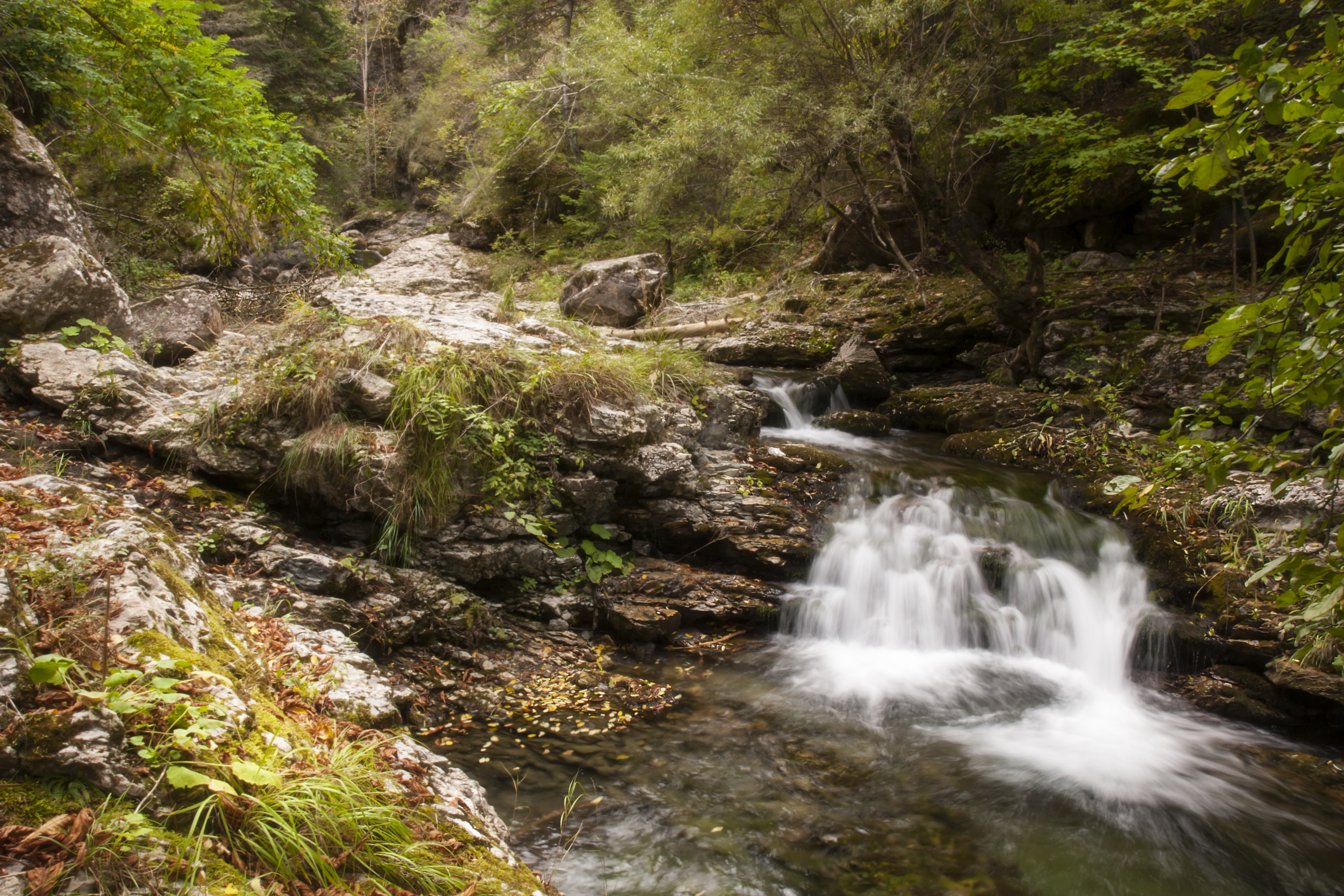
Several small springs come together as one stream just below the shrine to Our Lady of the Fountains.

Our Lady of the Fountain (French: Notre-Dame des Fontaines) is a Roman Catholic shrine located four kilometers (2.5 miles) from La Brigue, France, very close to the Italian border. The name derives from seven local springs that emerge from the rocks. It is one of the main tourist destinations in La Brigue, receiving up to 12,000 tourists per year.

The shrine is noted for a huge 15th-century fresco painting, depicting the cycle of Passion of Christ by Giovanni Canavesio. Some of the outstanding frescoes of the chapel have been reproduced in the Musée national des Monuments Français in Paris.

The church itself dates back to the 12th Century, being enlarged in the 1490s (the local legend states it was resanctified on the same day Christopher Columbus landed in the Americas). As is the case with other river sources in Liguria, this was a sacred site long before Christianity established itself in the region; Roman coins and other votive offerings have been found in the vicinity.
