= Peillon =

Commune in Provence-Alpes-Côte d'Azur, France

Peillon Pelhon (Occitan)
- Commune
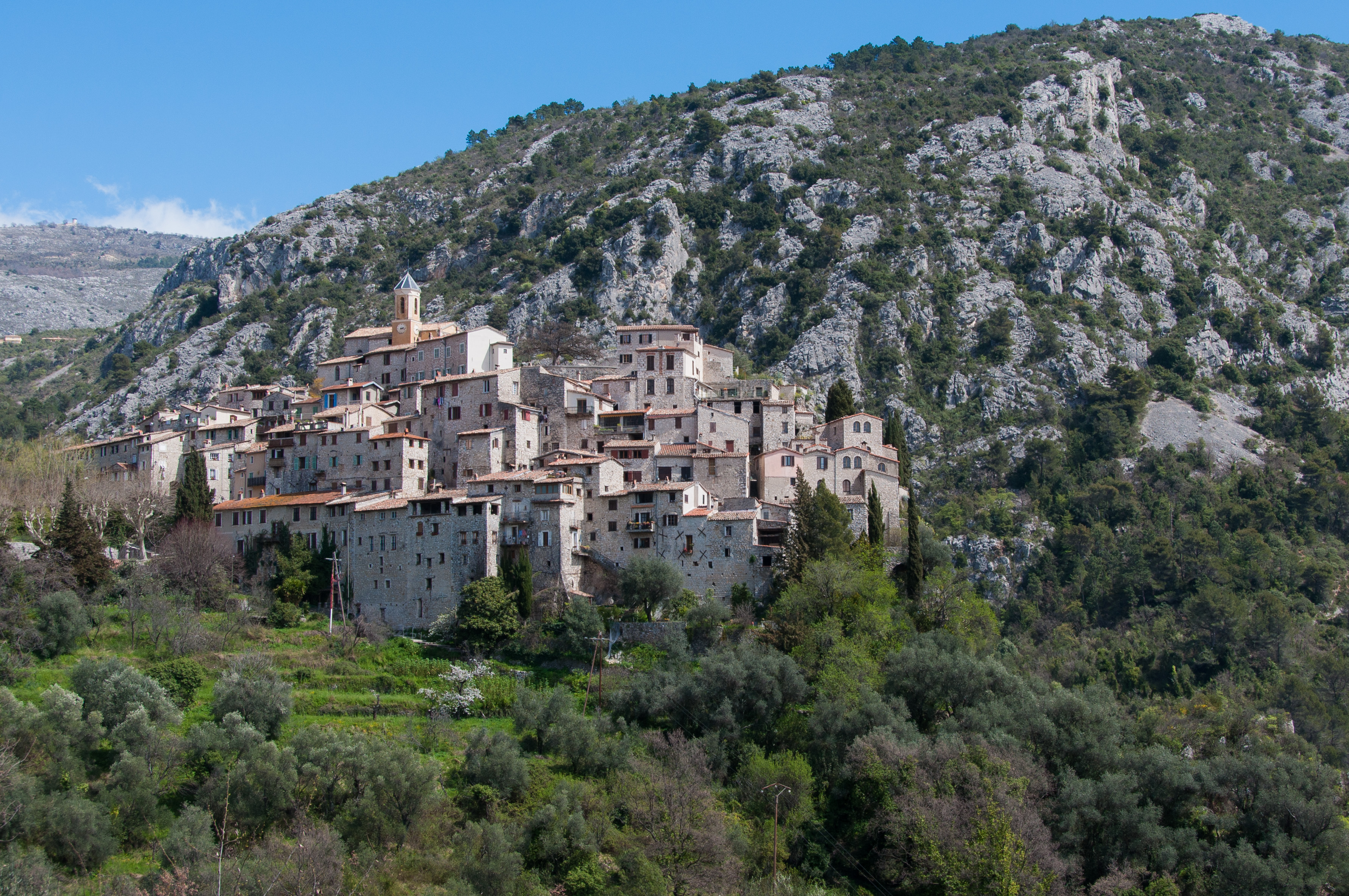
- A view across the Paillon Valley

- Coat of arms
- Location of Peillon
- Location within France Location within Provence-Alpes-Côte d'Azur
- Coordinates: 43°46′43″N 7°22′58″E
- Country: France
- Region: Provence-Alpes-Côte d'Azur
- Department: Alpes-Maritimes
- Arrondissement: Nice
- Canton: Contes
- Intercommunality: CC du Pays des Paillons

Government
  - Mayor (2026–32): Jean-Marc Rancurel
- Area^{1}: 8.7 km^{2} (3.4 sq mi)
- Elevation: 372 m (1,220 ft)
- Highest elevation: 720 m (2,360 ft)
- Lowest elevation: 115 m (377 ft)
- Population (2023): 1,408
  - Density: 160/km^{2} (420/sq mi)
- Demonym: Peillonnais
- Time zone: UTC+01:00 (CET)
  - Summer (DST): UTC+02:00 (CEST)
- INSEE/Postal code: 06092 /06440
- ^{1} French Land Register data, which excludes lakes, ponds, glaciers > 1 km^{2} (0.386 sq mi or 247 acres) and river estuaries.

Peillon (French pronunciation: [pɛjɔ̃]; Occitan: Pelhon; Italian: Peglione, formerly) is a rural commune in the Alpes-Maritimes department in the southeastern Provence-Alpes-Côte d'Azur region in France.

== Village perché ==
The village of Peillon, perched on a hilltop in the Paillon Valley, is known to have stairs instead of roads; it is dominated by its Église Saint-Sauveur (Saint Sauveur church), which was last restored in 1980. It is also home to the Chapelle Notre-Dame des Sept Douleurs (Notre Dame des Sept Douleurs chapel), which features 15th-century fresco paintings by Giovanni Canavesio.

== Transport ==
The commune is served by Peillon-Sainte-Thècle station in the valley, on the Nice to Breil-sur-Roya SNCF railway.

== Demographics ==
Historical population
Year	Pop.	±% p.a.
1968	937	—
1975	898	−0.61%
1982	1,038	+2.09%
1990	1,139	+1.17%
1999	1,227	+0.83%
2007	1,336	+1.07%
2012	1,439	+1.50%
2017	1,457	+0.25%
2023	1,408	−0.57%
Source: INSEE

In French, the inhabitants are called Peillonnais (masculine) and Peillonnaises (feminine).

== See also ==
- Communes of the Alpes-Maritimes department
