= Prayerbook of Albert of Brandenburg =

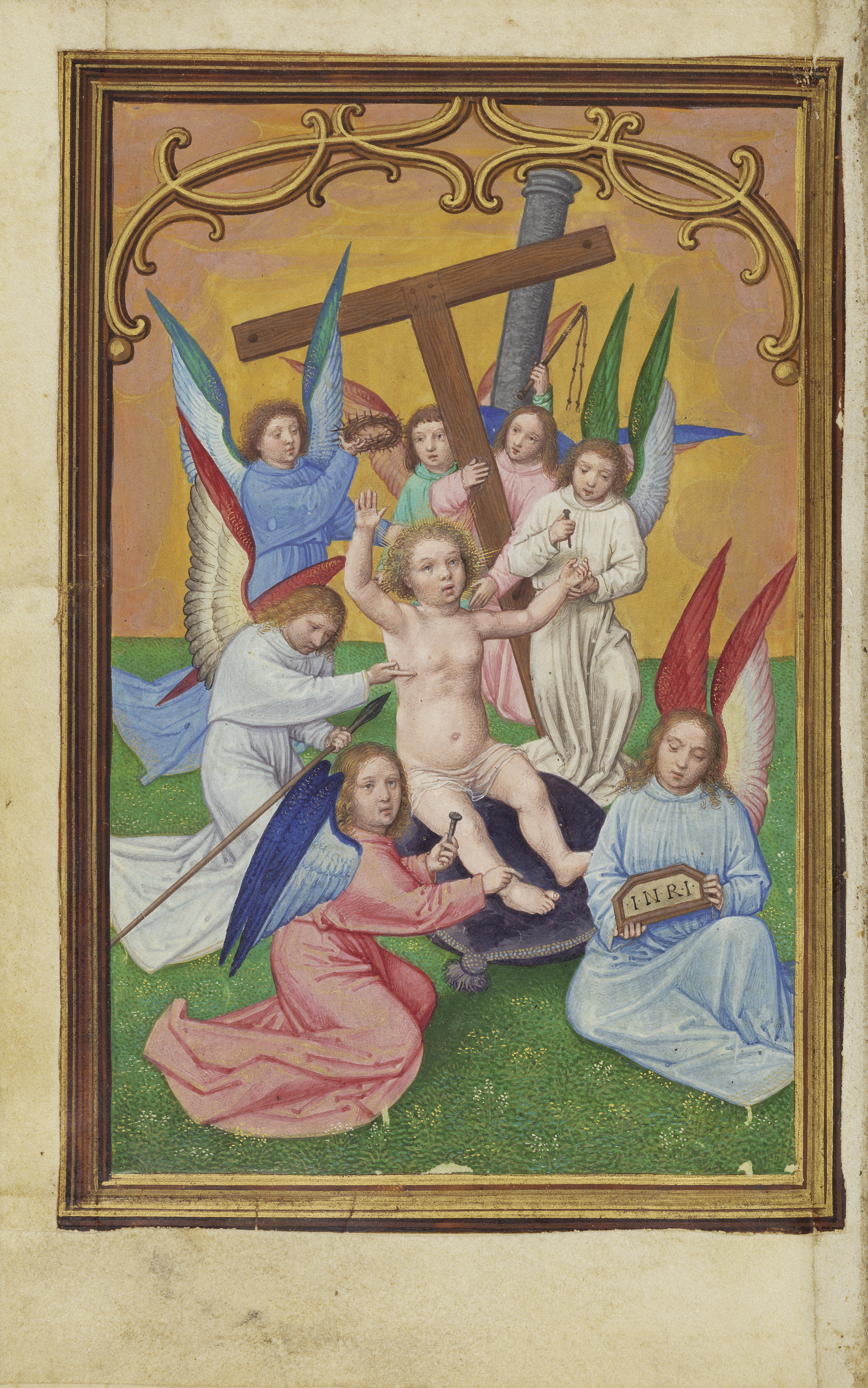
The Christ Child Surrounded by the Instruments of the Passion, f.31v.

The Prayerbook of Albert of Brandenburg is a c.1525-1530 illuminated manuscript produced in Flanders by Simon Bening for Cardinal Albert of Brandenburg. It contains 42 full page miniatures and 35 pages decorated with marginal scenes. It is now in the J. Paul Getty Museum, with the catalogue number MS. Ludwig IX 19.
