= Giacomo Jaquerio =

Piedmontese medieval painter

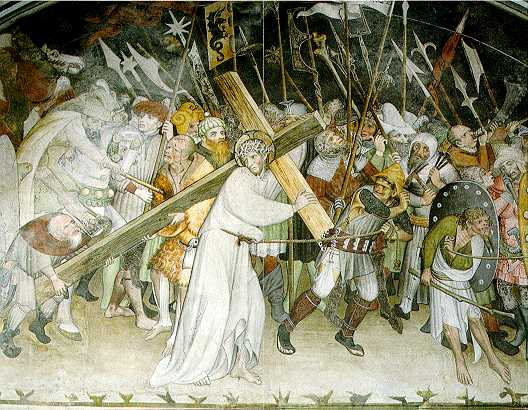
The Calvary, at the Abbey of Sant'Antonio di Ranverso.

Giacomo Jaquerio (c. 1375 – 1453) was a Piedmontese medieval painter, one of the main exponents of Gothic painting in Piedmont. He was active in his native Turin, in Geneva and in other localities of Savoy.

== Biography ==
He was born into a family of painters, and in his early life he moved frequently from Turin to Geneva, Thonon-les-Bains and other French localities, mostly working for Duke Amadeus VIII of Savoy, noble families and religious institutions. Starting from 1429, he lived in Turin. For the princes of Acaja, he frescoed the castle of Turin (the current Palazzo Madama), but his work there has been lost.

His other works include fragments of frescoes with Musician Angels (c. 1410 – 1415) in the Maccabi Chapel of the Cathedral of Geneva, now in that city's Musée d'Art et d'Histoire, and a series of frescoes in the Preceptory of Sant'Antonio in Ranverso (from c. 1410). Also attributed to Jaquerio are two tables with the Stories of St. Peter in the Museo Civico d'Arte Antica in Turin (c. 1410) and a miniature of the Crucifixion (c. 1420) in the Aosta Cathedral Museum.

== Miniature ==
As usual in the pictorial workshops of that era, miniature works must have also been part of Jaquerio's production. He unanimously attributed a full-page Crucifixion (about 1420) in the missal of Bishop Oger Moriset conserved in the Treasure Museum of the Cathedral of Aosta.
