= Buttigliera Alta =

- Comune
- Comune di Buttigliera Alta
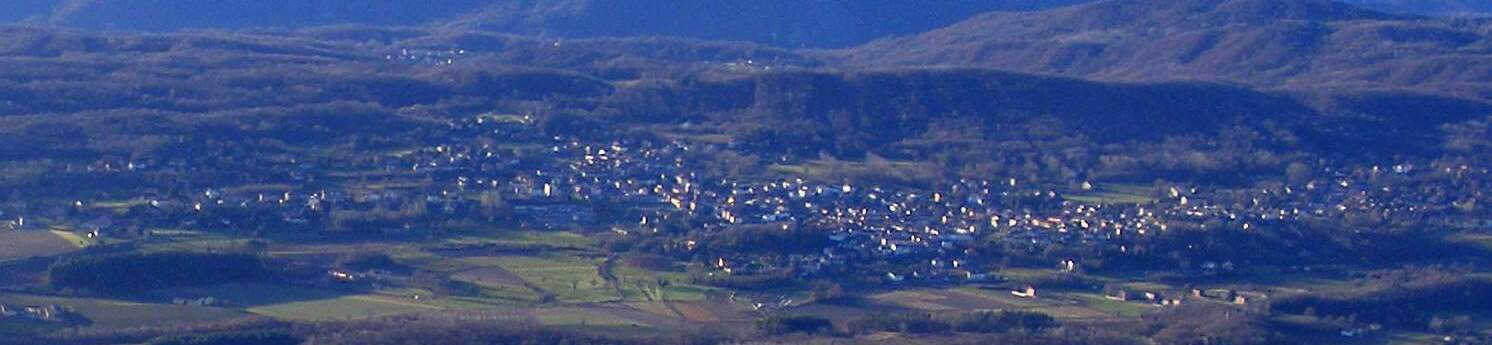
- Panorama from Mount Musinè

- Coat of arms

- Location within Italy Location within Piedmont
- Coordinates: 45°4′N 7°25′E
- Country: Italy
- Region: Piedmont
- Metropolitan city: Turin (TO)
- Frazioni: Ferriera

Government
  - Mayor: Paolo Ruzzola

Area
  - Total: 8.1 km^{2} (3.1 sq mi)
- Elevation: 414 m (1,358 ft)

Population (30 November 2017 2017)
  - Total: 6,409
  - Density: 790/km^{2} (2,000/sq mi)
- Demonym: Buttiglieresi
- Time zone: UTC+1 (CET)
  - Summer (DST): UTC+2 (CEST)
- Postal code: 10090
- Dialing code: 011
- Patron saint: St. Mark
- Saint day: 25 April
- Website: Official website

Buttigliera Alta is a town and comune in the Metropolitan City of Turin about 25 kilometres (16 mi) from Turin in the Susa valley in Piedmont, northern Italy. It is not far to Avigliana, of which it once was a part.

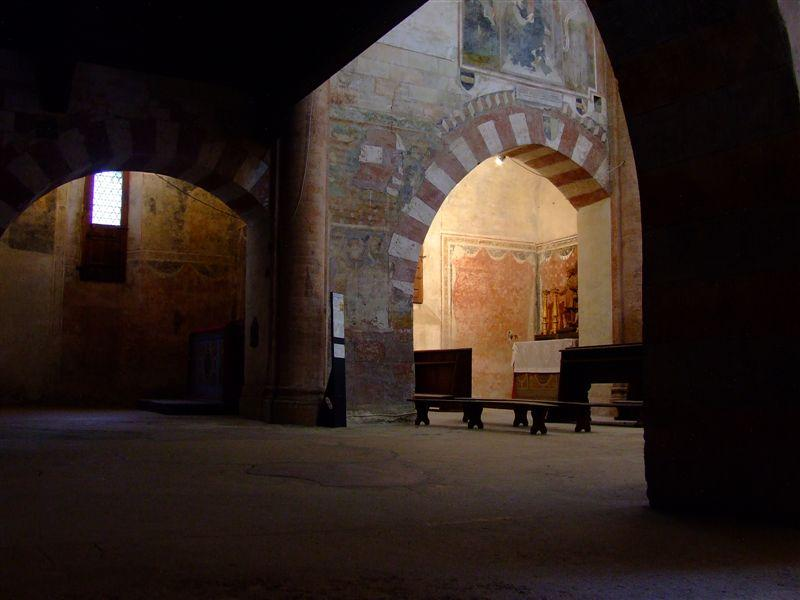
Interior of Sant'Antonio di Ranverso.

== History ==
It first became an autonomous fief in 1619 when Giovanni Carron received the fiefs of Buttigliera, Uriola, and Case Nicola - as well as the title of Count - from Duke Charles Emmanuel I of Savoy.

From that point in time the history of Buttigliera was intimately tied with the history of the Carron family. The last member of the family, Clementina Carron, died in April 1912.

In the 20th century, the FIAT group established one of its metallurgical factories in Ferriera, a frazione of Buttigliera Alta.

== Main sights ==
- The nearby Sacra di San Michele. It is located at the entrance to the Susa Valley.
- The preceptory of Sant'Antonio di Ranverso.

== Twin towns ==
- Jougne, France
