= La Brigue =

Commune in Provence-Alpes-Côte d'Azur, France

- Commune
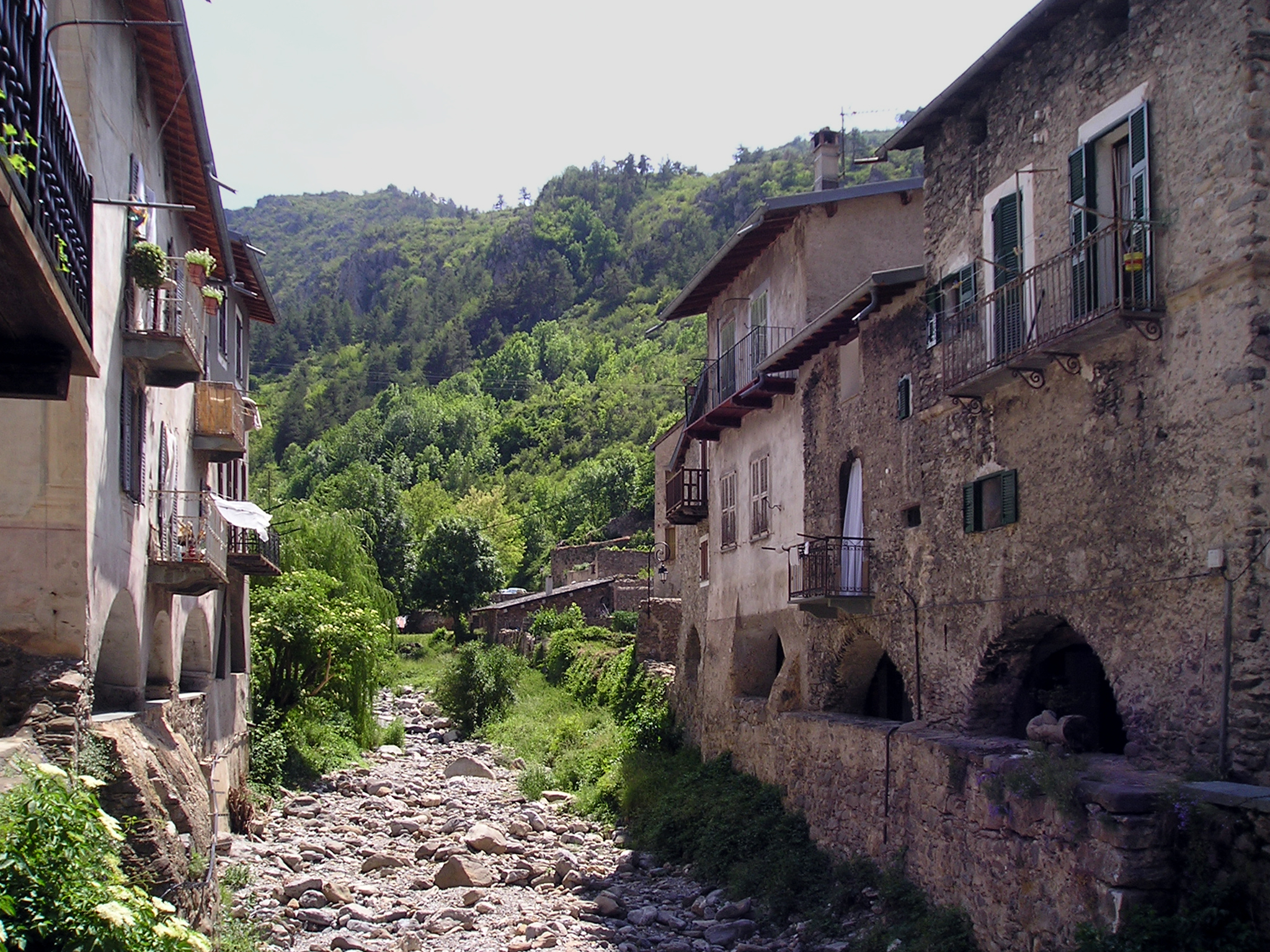
- A view of the dry riverbed of the Rio Sec in La Brigue

- Coat of arms
- Location of La Brigue
- Location within France Location within Provence-Alpes-Côte d'Azur
- Coordinates: 44°03′47″N 7°37′01″E
- Country: France
- Region: Provence-Alpes-Côte d'Azur
- Department: Alpes-Maritimes
- Arrondissement: Nice
- Canton: Contes
- Intercommunality: CA Riviera Française

Government
  - Mayor (2026–32): José Pastorelli
- Area^{1}: 91.77 km^{2} (35.43 sq mi)
- Elevation: 812 m (2,664 ft)
- Highest elevation: 2,650 m (8,690 ft)
- Lowest elevation: 559 m (1,834 ft)
- Population (2023): 763
  - Density: 8.31/km^{2} (21.5/sq mi)
- Demonym: Brigasques
- Time zone: UTC+01:00 (CET)
  - Summer (DST): UTC+02:00 (CEST)
- INSEE/Postal code: 06162 /06430
- ^{1} French Land Register data, which excludes lakes, ponds, glaciers > 1 km^{2} (0.386 sq mi or 247 acres) and river estuaries.

La Brigue (French pronunciation: [la bʁiɡ]; Ligurian: Briga; Vivaro-Alpine: La Briga; Italian: Briga Marittima) is a commune in the Alpes-Maritimes department in southeastern France.

La Brigue became part of France after World War II, when Italy was forced to hand it over in September 1947 under the terms of the Peace of Paris. Before the hand over, it was part of the Province of Cuneo and was officially known as Briga Marittima. The transfer, which was not unopposed in the village, was retrospectively endorsed by a local plebiscite which took place on 12 October 1947 and was subject to international supervision.

== History ==
After World War II, France asked for the annexation of the territories of Tende and La Brigue, and obtained them according to the provisions of the Treaty of Paris signed on 10 February 1947, which entered into force on the following 15 September.

However, due to the fact that the Constitution of the French Fourth Republic required that there be no territorial acquisitions without the consent of the populations concerned, the French authorities held a referendum with the population on 12 October, so that they could choose between France and Italy, even though La Brigue was already under the military and administrative control of France since the entry into force of the peace treaty in September.

The prospect of a change of nationality divided the socialist family, in any case a minority in La Brigue. On the one hand, the Italian Socialist Party was in favor of annexation, while on the other, paradoxically, the charismatic leader of the French socialists Léon Blum was the most critical of this expansionist project. Either way, in the 1947 plebiscite on the issue, the Brigasks chose in favor of the transfer of sovereignty. Only citizens who resided in the area at the time of the referendum, with at least one parent born in the countries concerned or who could prove that they were domiciled there before the seizure of power by the fascists in Italy in 1922 were admitted for the vote. Part of the inhabitants who had taken refuge in Italy were thus excluded from the vote, since they had not changed their nationality to acquire French nationality. The result gave an almost unanimous support (96.07%) for France: out of 790 voters, 759 chose France and 26 Italy. There were five blank or unvalid ballots. When the data from the 1946 Constituent vote was compared with those from 1947 for the Treaty, it was concluded that the exiles would not have been able to reverse the outcome of the second vote. The outcome of this plebiscite was consistent with that of 1860 at the end of which the County of Nice had become French.

== Sights ==
Looking across the village to the northwest, high rocky cliffs tower over La Brigue.Many of the buildings are of natural stone and many are nicely renovated with pastel facades and green lauze doorways and steps. The Shrine of Our Lady of the Fountains is the home to a huge 15th-century painting (cycle of passion) by the painter Giovanni Piemontese Canavesio, and is a major tourist destination.

== Tourism ==
The village is situated along the long-distance hiking trail GR52A. Another attraction for mountain sports enthusiasts is a nearby via ferrata of medium difficulty (C/D) which ascends about 250 metres above the village.

== Demographics ==
Historical population
Year	Pop.	±% p.a.
1968	582	—
1975	493	−2.34%
1982	495	+0.06%
1990	618	+2.81%
1999	595	−0.42%
2007	633	+0.78%
2012	726	+2.78%
2017	700	−0.73%
2023	763	+1.45%
Source: INSEE

== Twin towns — sister cities ==
La Brigue is twinned with:

- Triora, Italy (2006)

== See also ==
- Communes of the Alpes-Maritimes department
