= Simon Bening =

Flemish miniaturist (c. 1483 – 1561)

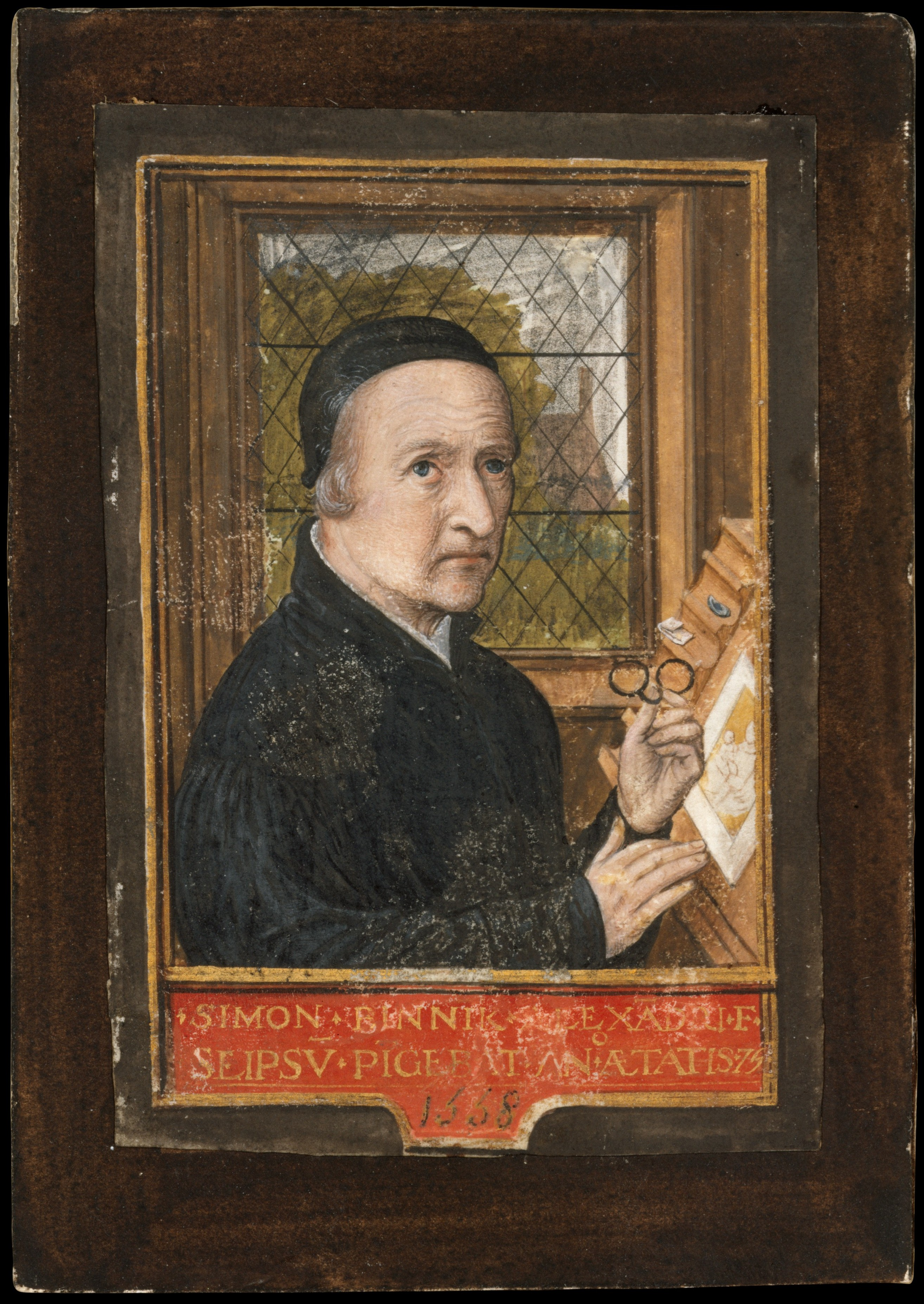
Self-portrait, tempera on parchment (8.5 cm × 5.7 cm), Metropolitan Museum of Art, New York. The inscription in Latin reads "Simon Bennik. Alexandri. [F]ilius Se Ipsu. Pi[n]gebat. Ano. Aetatis. 75. 1558." ("Simon Bennik, the son of Alexander, painted this himself at the age of 75 in 1558").

Simon Bening (c. 1483 – 1561) was a Flemish miniaturist, generally regarded as the last major artist of the Netherlandish tradition.

Bening, born either in Ghent or Antwerp, was probably trained by his father, illuminator Alexander Bening, in the family workshop in Ghent. He travelled between Ghent and Bruges and became a member of the guild of San John and Saint Luke in Bruges as an illuminator in 1508. He made his own name after moving to Bruges in about 1510, where he had lived since. From 1517 to 1555 he is listed regularly in the guild's annual accounts. Bening served as a dean of the calligraphers, booksellers, illuminators and bookbinders in the Guild of Saint John and Saint Luke three separate times (1524, 1536, 1546).

He was married twice and had six daughters. Two of them continued the family artistic tradition: Levina Teerlinc became a miniature painter, mostly of portrait miniatures, and emigrated to England, and Alexandrine Claeiszuene became a successful art dealer.

== Works ==
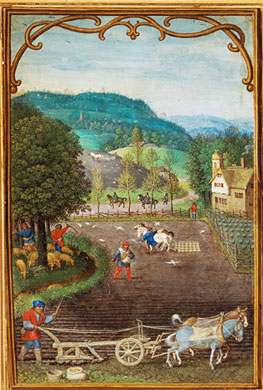
Calendar page for September or October, watercolour on vellum (14 cm × 95 cm), 1540, Victoria and Albert Museum, London

Bening specialised in Books of Hours, but by his time these were produced only for royal or very rich patrons. He also created genealogical tables and portable altarpieces on parchment as well as oil paintings on wooden panels. He was known to extend miniature painting into the borders. His usage of illusionistic picture frames serve to function as small devotional panels. Many of his finest works are Labours of the Months for Books of Hours which are largely small-scale landscapes, at that time a nascent genre of painting. In other respects his style is relatively little developed beyond that of the years before his birth, but his landscapes serve as a link between the 15th-century illuminators and Pieter Brueghel the Elder. His self-portrait and other portraits equally are early examples of the portrait miniature.

He produced books for German rulers, like Cardinal Albrecht of Brandenburg, and royalty like Emperor Charles V and Don Fernando, the Infante of Portugal. Robert de Clercq, abbot of the Cistercian monastery of Ter Duinen ("Les Dunes") at Koksijde, near Bruges, commissioned a Benedictional from him sometime between 1519 and 1529. Bening portrayed the abbot in a colourful Crucifixion scene.

Bening's usage of illusionism, pictorial narrative and creative adaptation demonstrates his influence from the leading illuminators, printmakers and painters of his near contemporaries such as Jan van Eyck, Mary of Burgundy, Martin Schongauer, Gerard David, and Albrecht Dürer.

== Selected works ==
- Labours of the Months
- Munich-Montserrat Book of Hours
- Prayerbook of Albert of Brandenburg, J. Paul Getty Museum
- Codex of the Order of the Golden Fleece, Patrimonio Nacional, Spain.

== Gallery ==
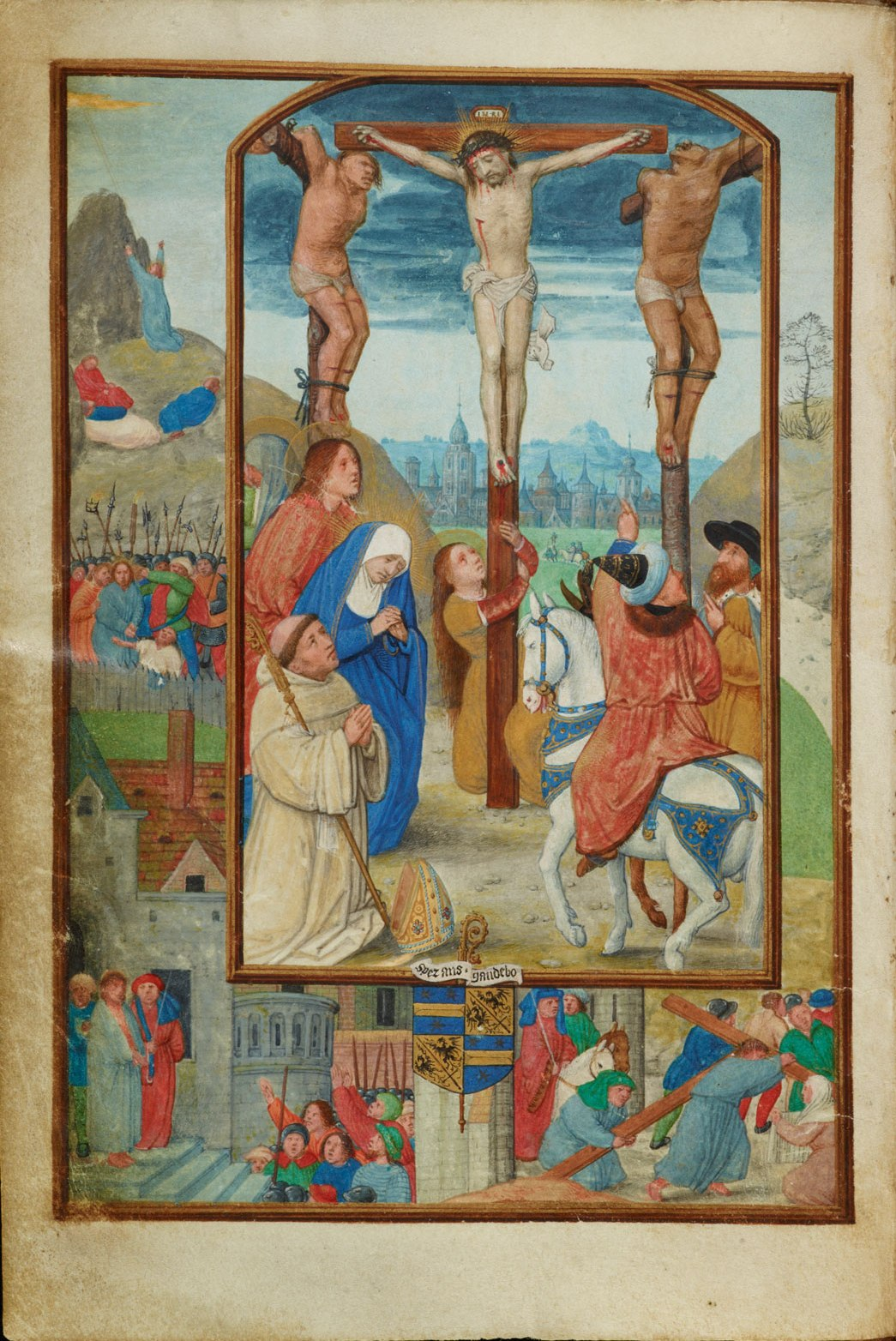
Benedictional of Robert de Clercq: Crucifixion, f. 4v, Cambridge University Library, Cambridge

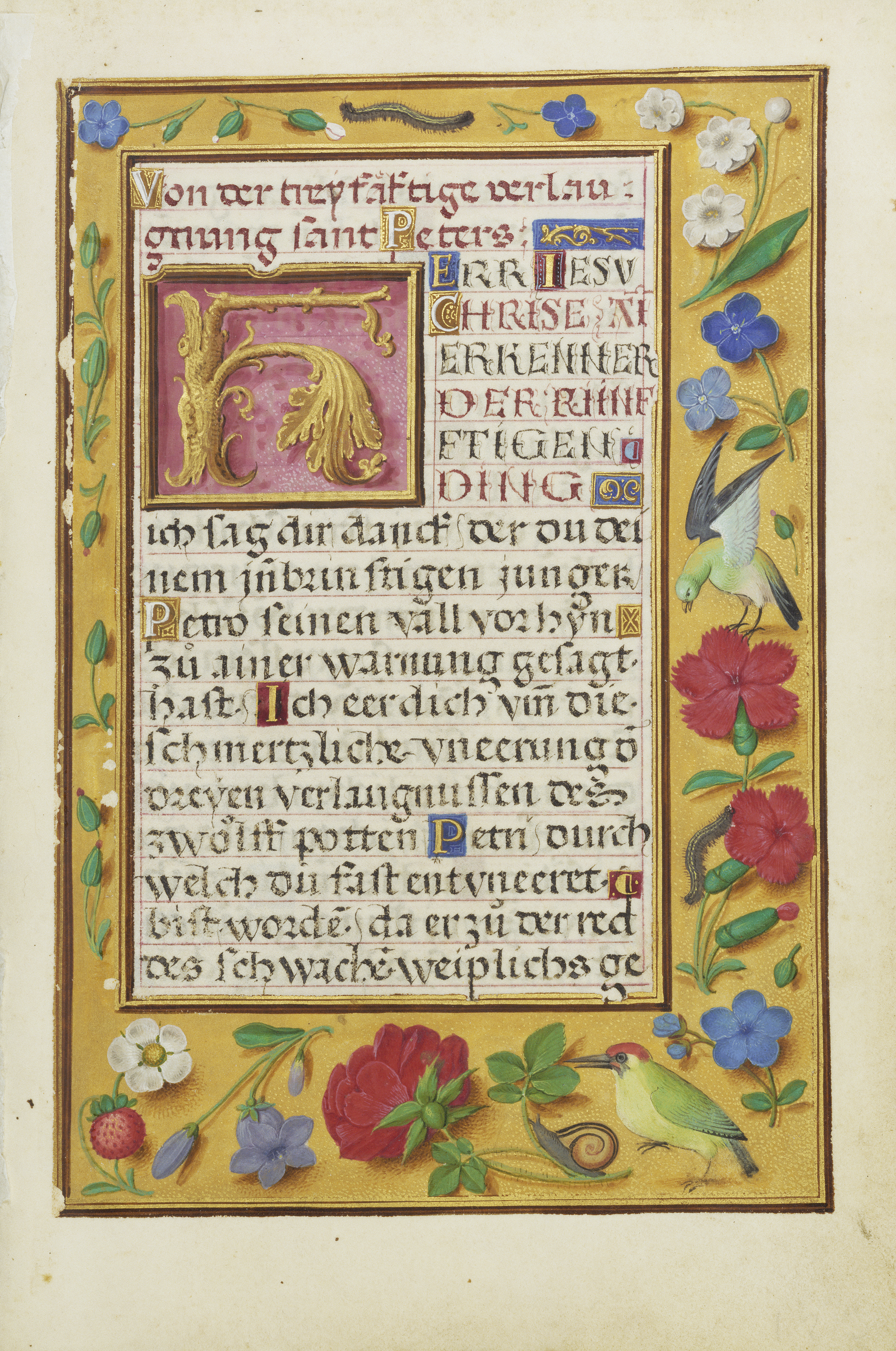
Prayer Book of Cardinal Albrecht of Brandenburg: text page with decorated borders, f 124, J. Paul Getty Museum, Los Angeles

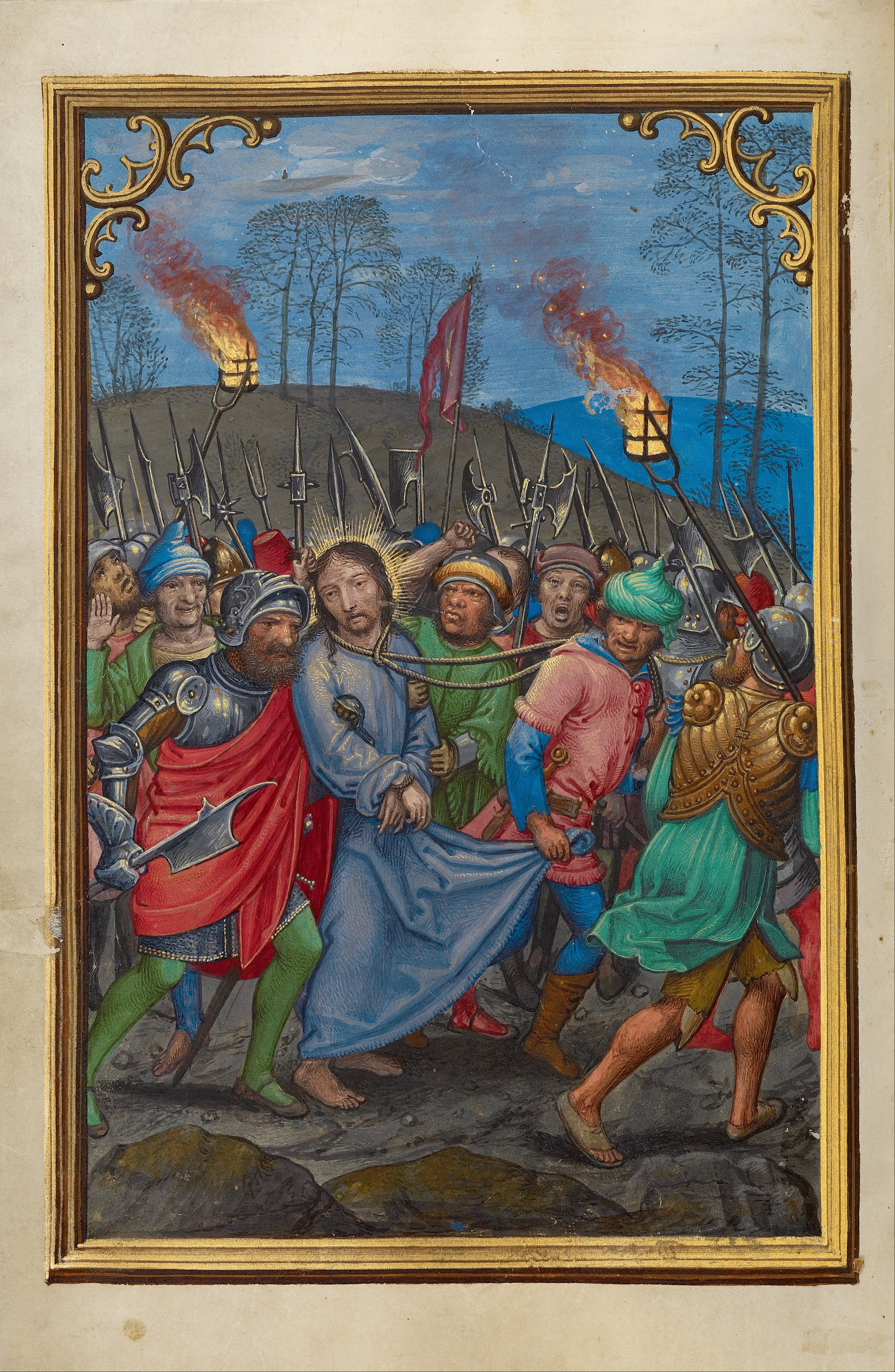
Prayer Book of Cardinal Albrecht of Brandenburg: The Arrest of Christ, f 107v, J. Paul Getty Museum, Los Angeles

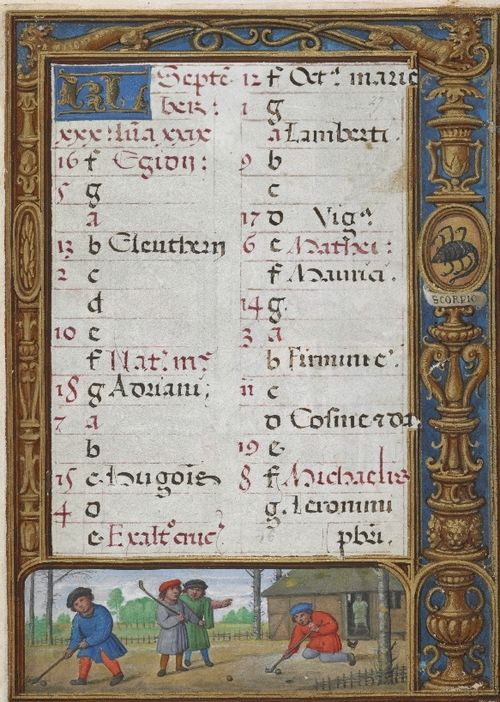
Four men playing a game that resembles golf. The Golf book, British Library

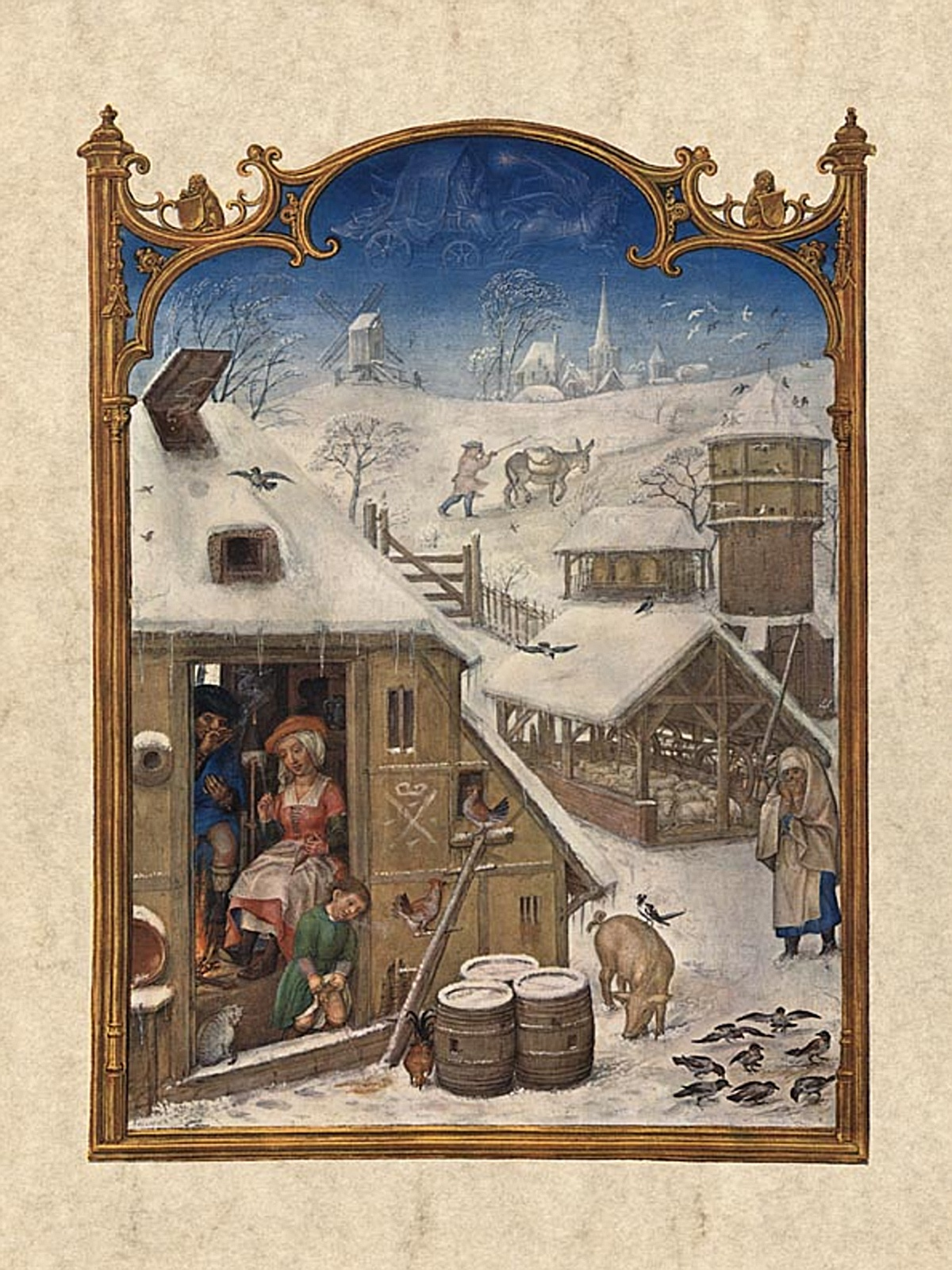
February, Breviarium Grimaldi (1515–1520), Biblioteca Nazionale Marciana, Venice (Italy)

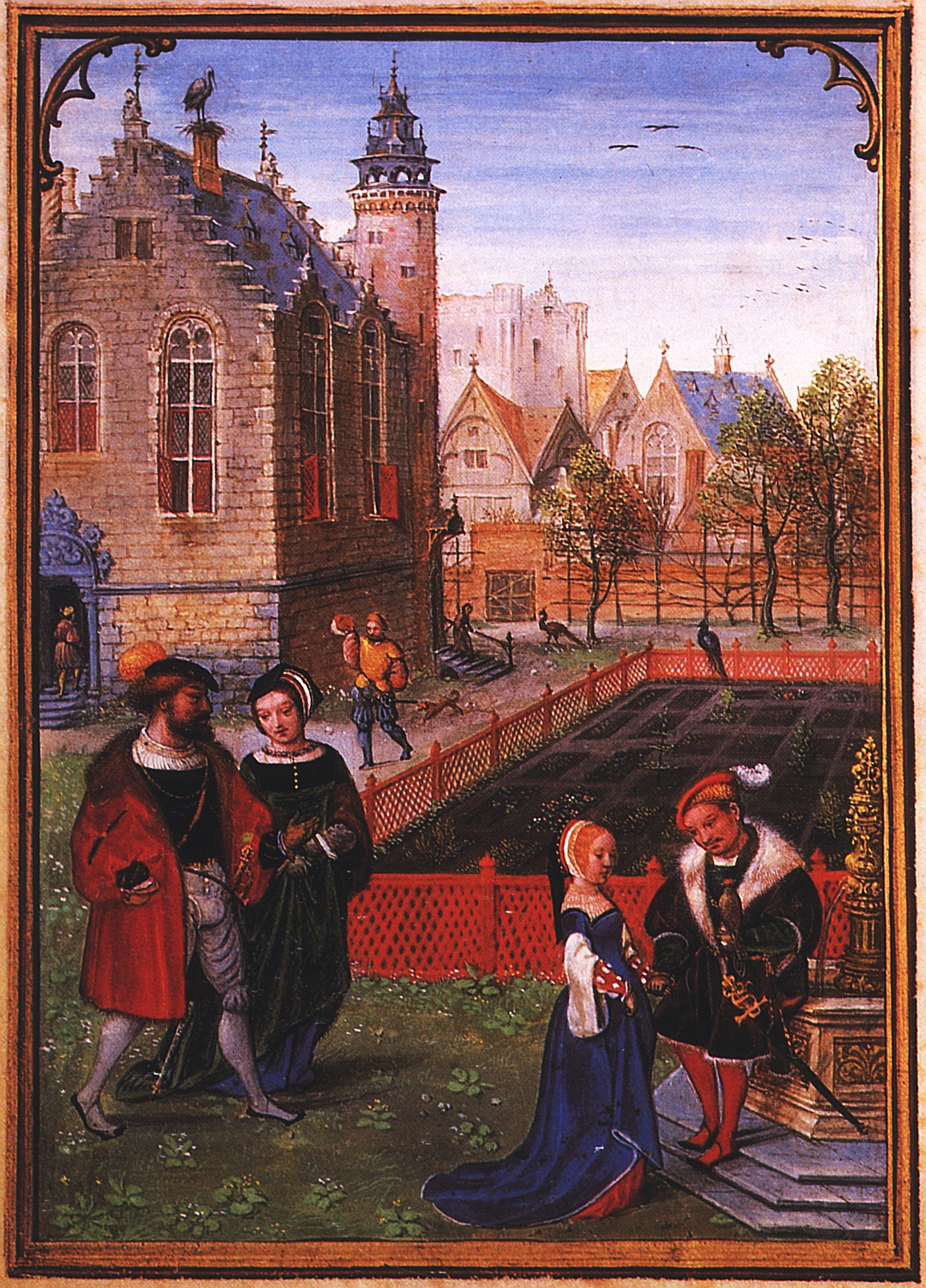
Labors of the Months: April, from a book of hours

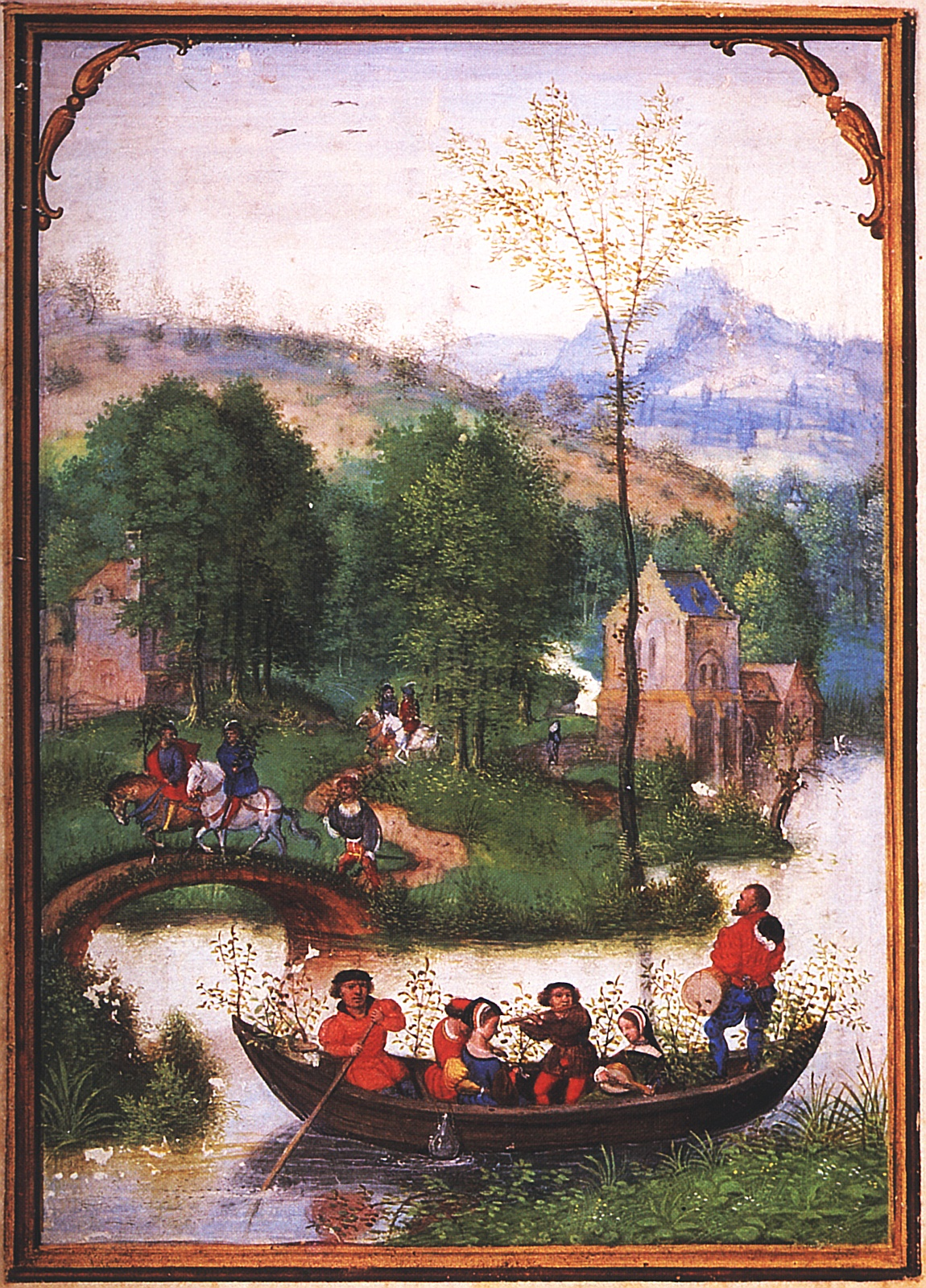
Labors of the Months: May

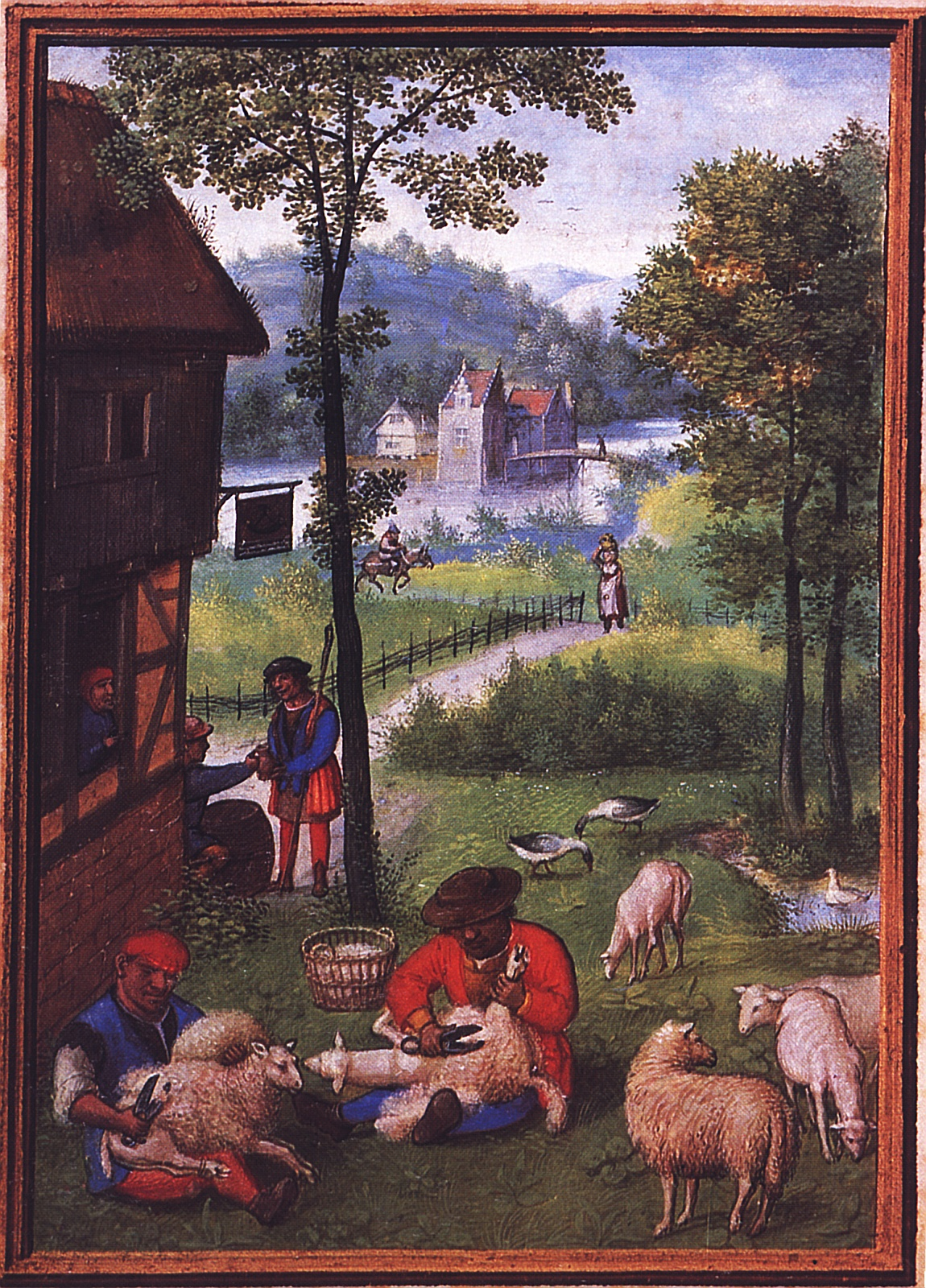
Labors of the Months: June

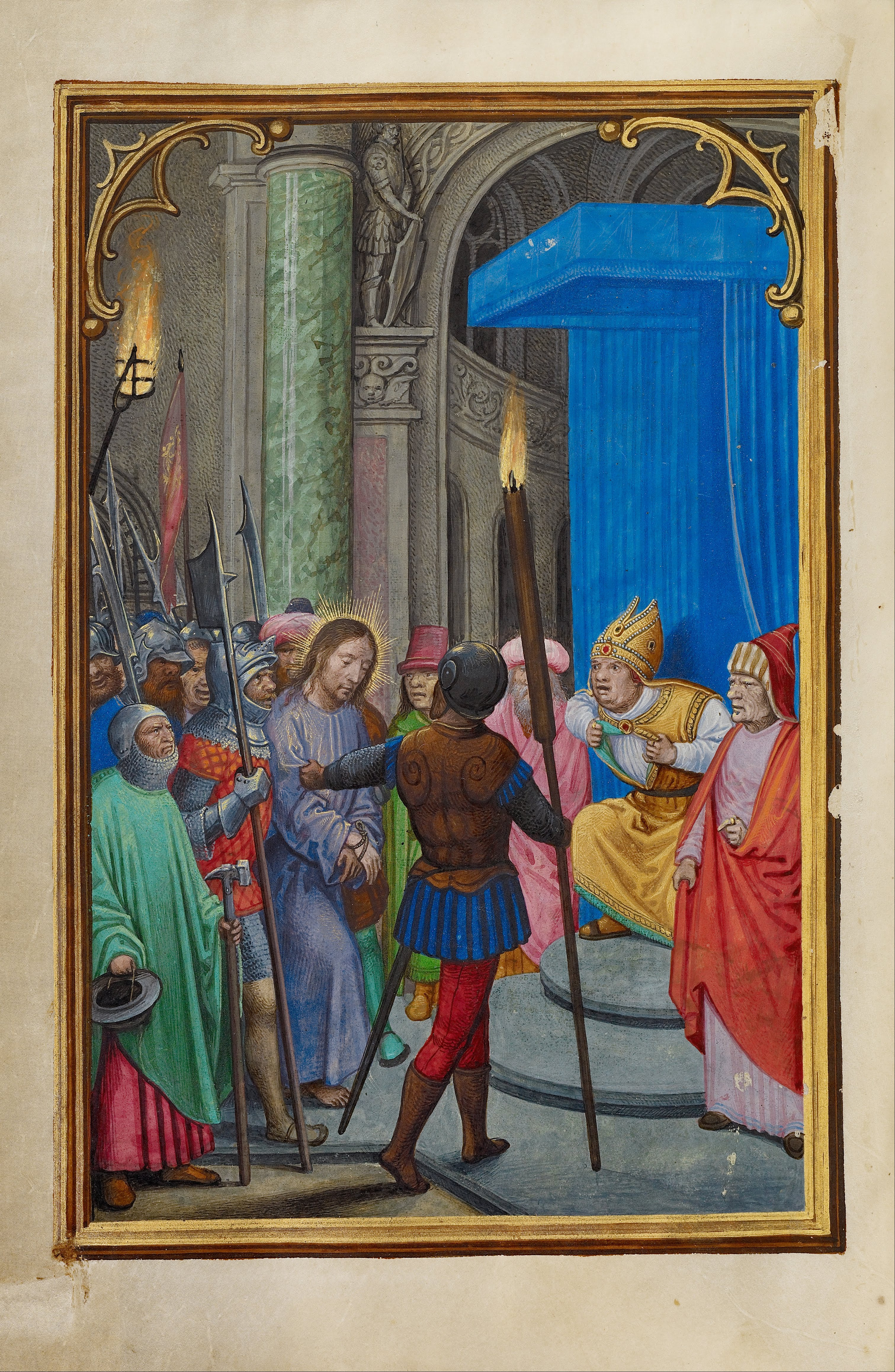
Christ before Caiaphas

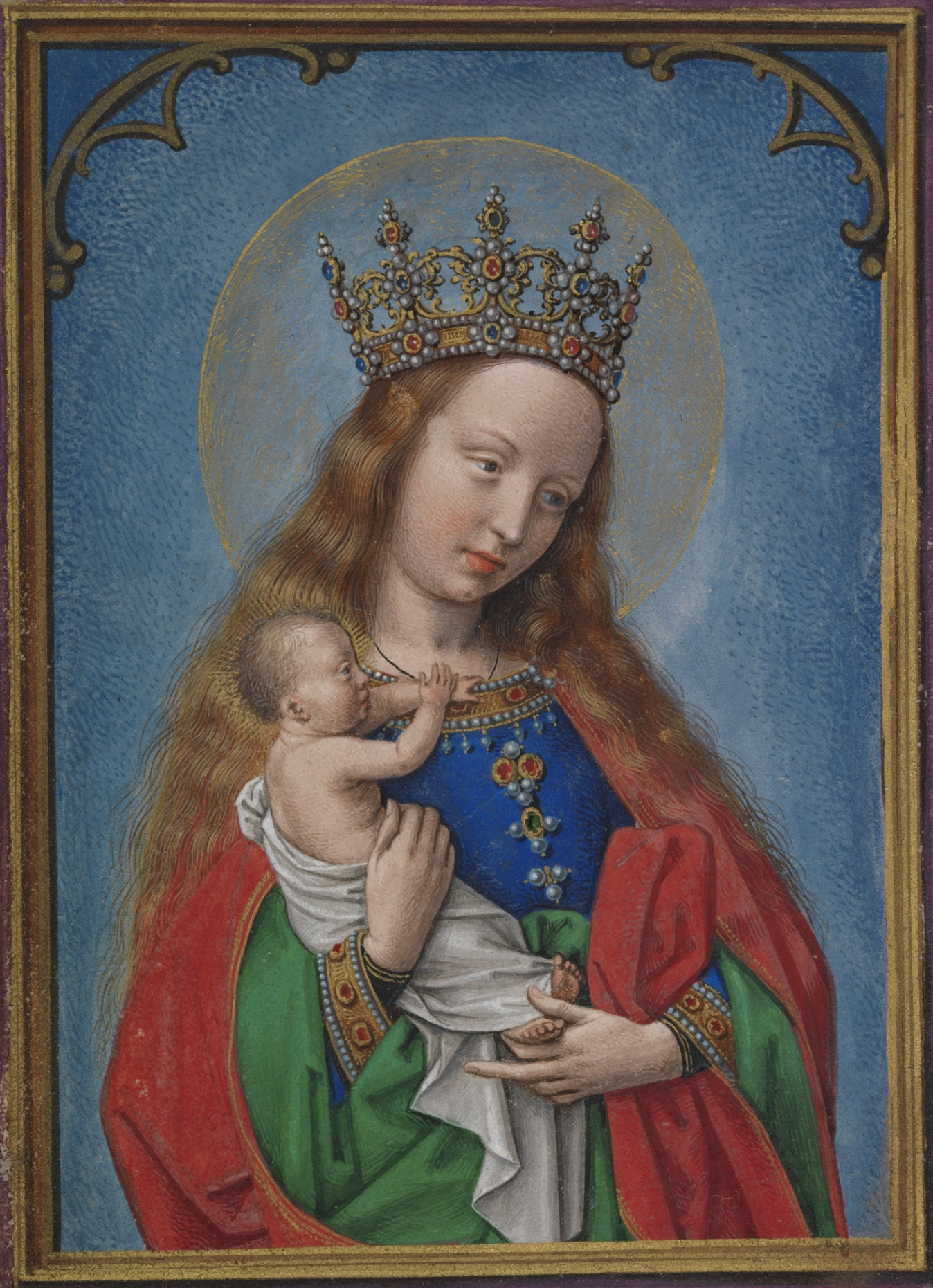
Virgin and Child

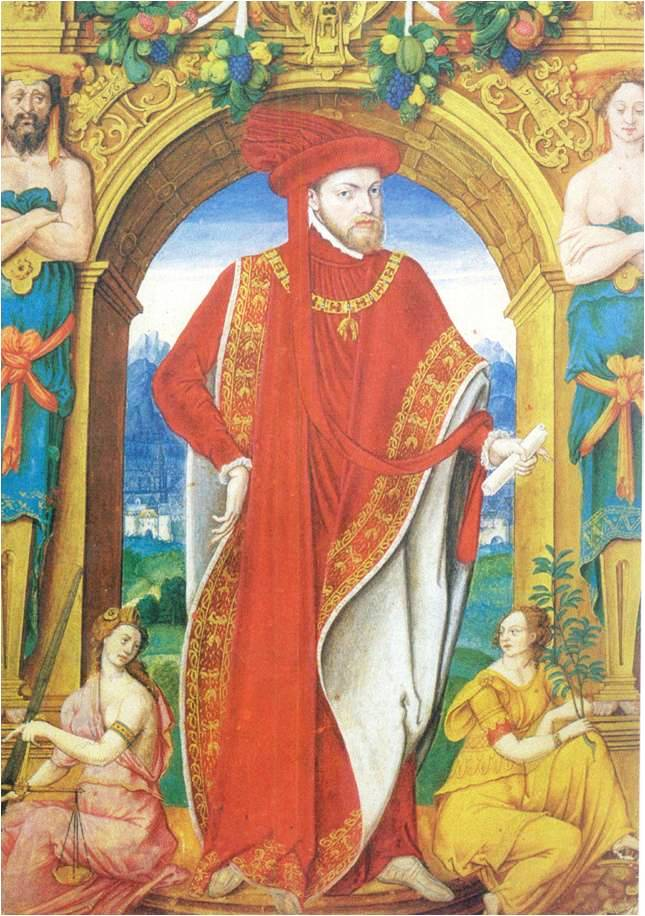
Phillip II as The grand master of the order. Codex of the Golden Fleece Order 1536. Patrimonio Nacional, Madrid, Spain.

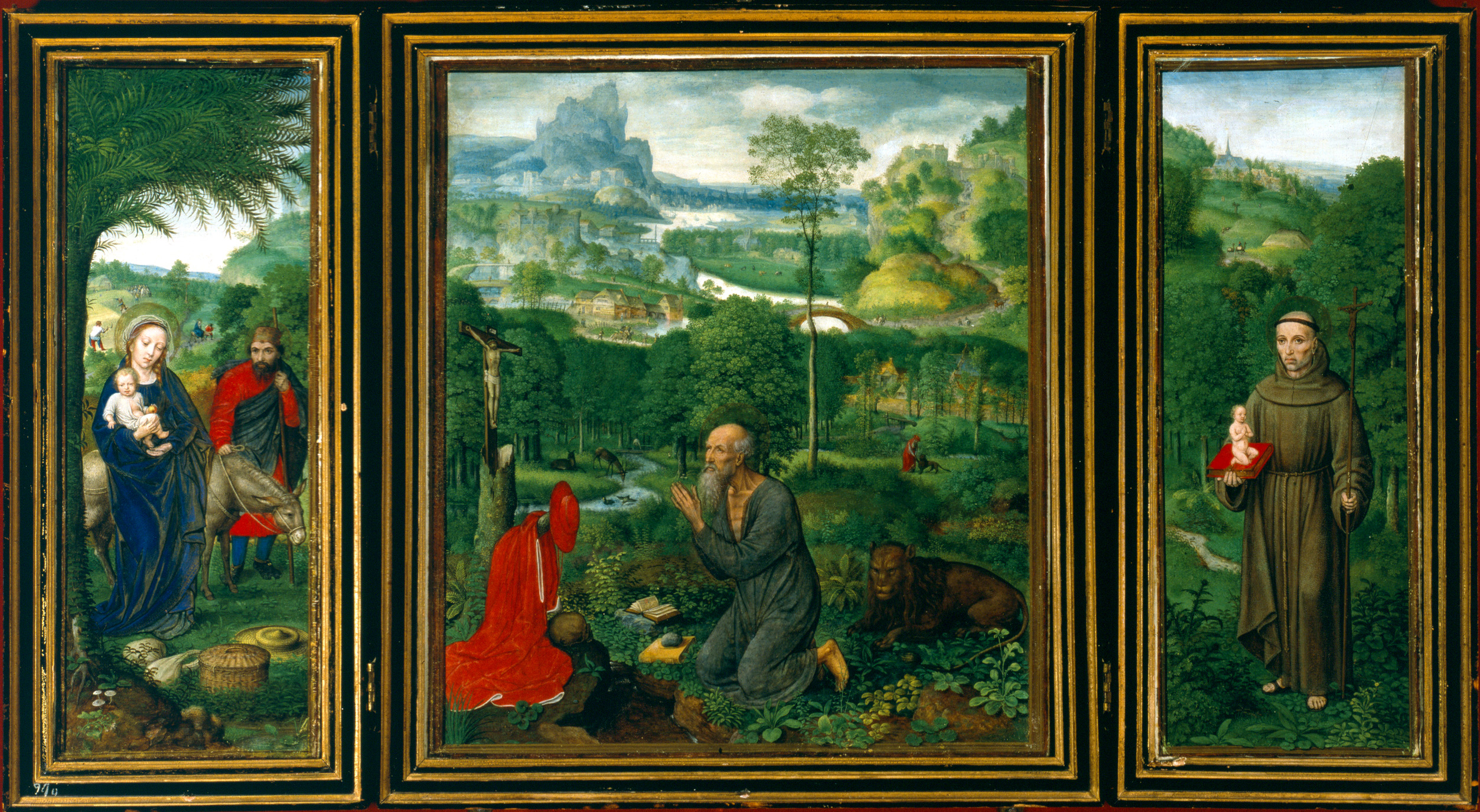
Tripthyc of St. Jerome, tempera on parchment adhered to panel. Monastery of El Escorial, Madrid.

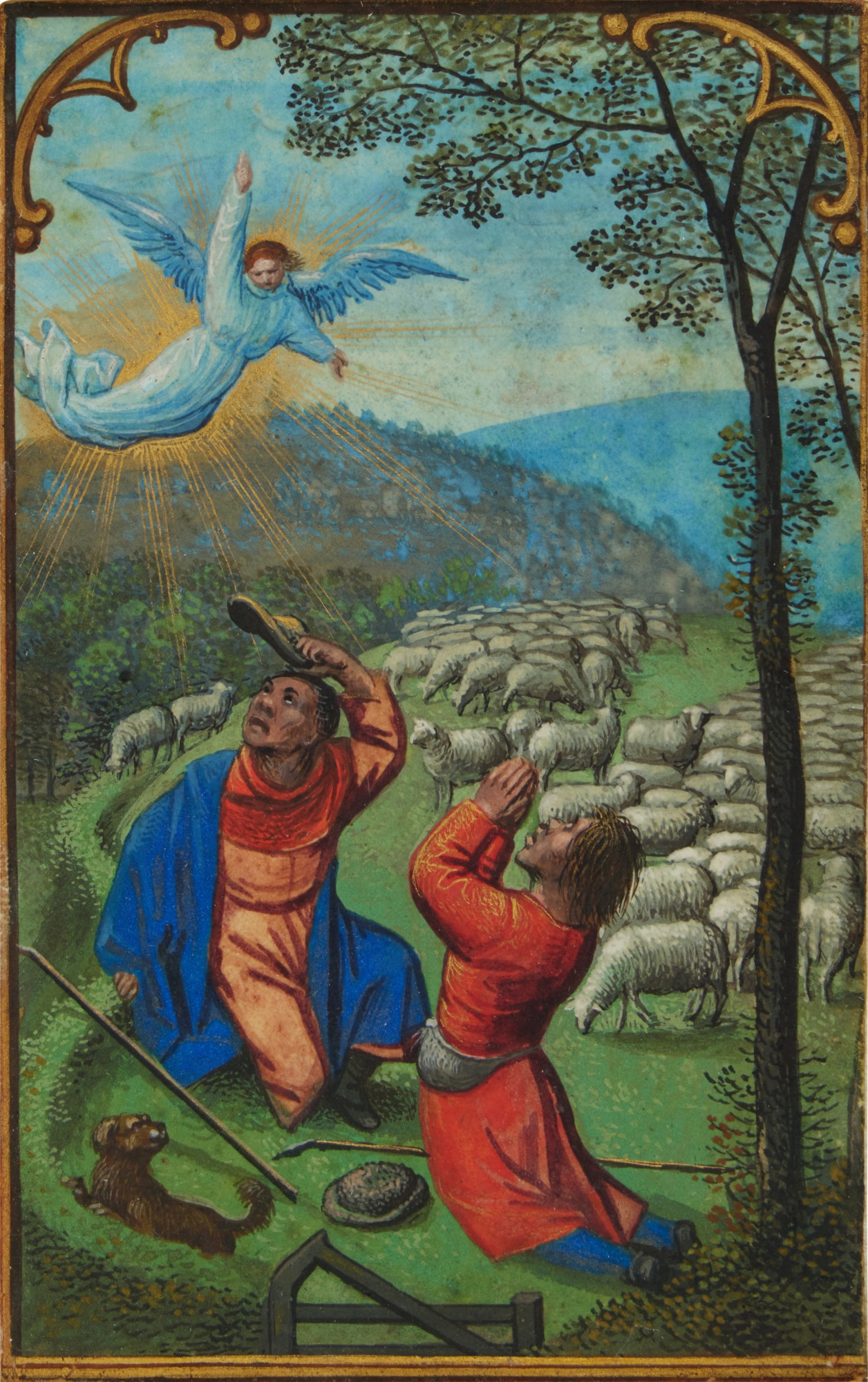
The Annunciation to the Shepherds

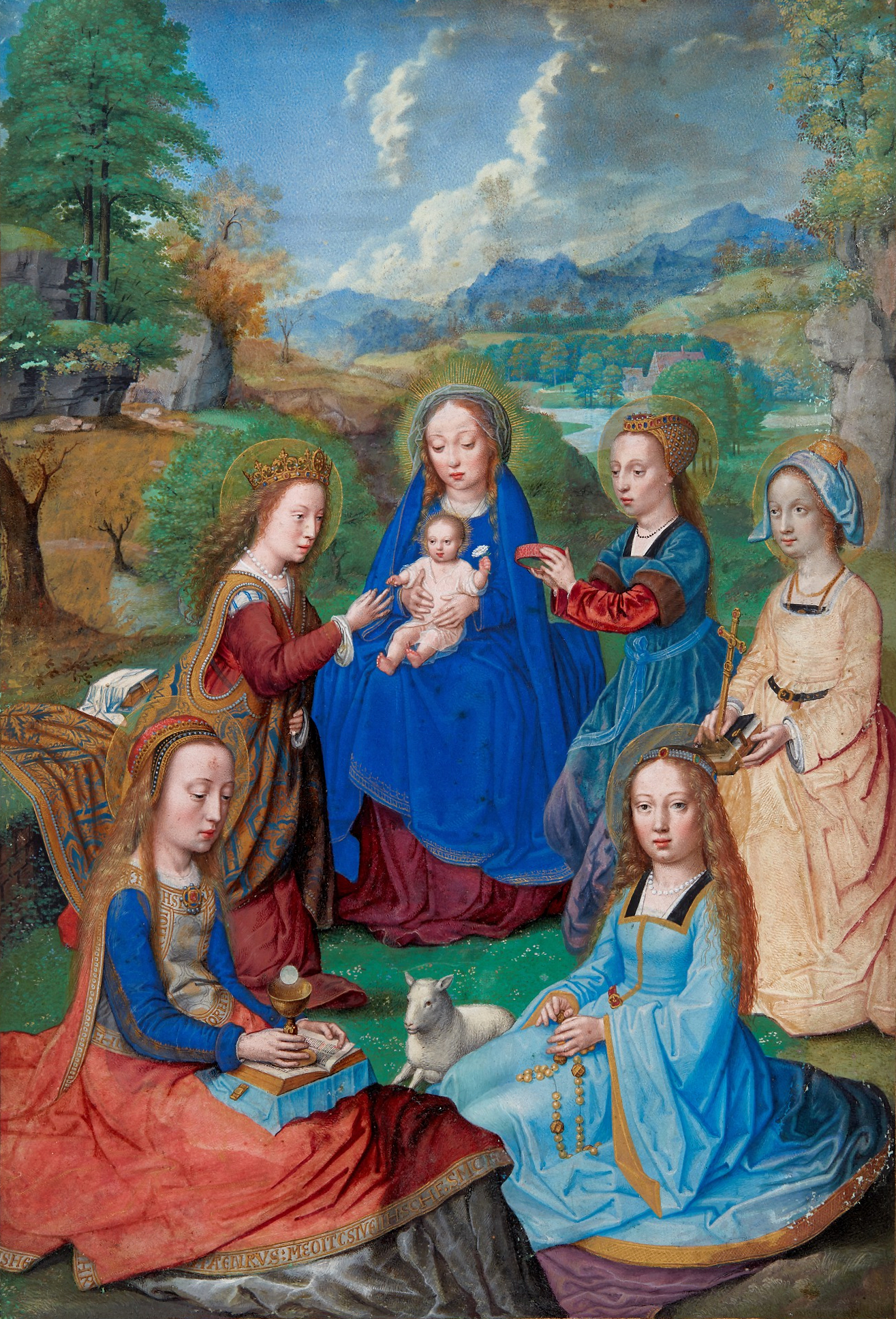
Virgin amongst virgins (Virgo inter virgines)

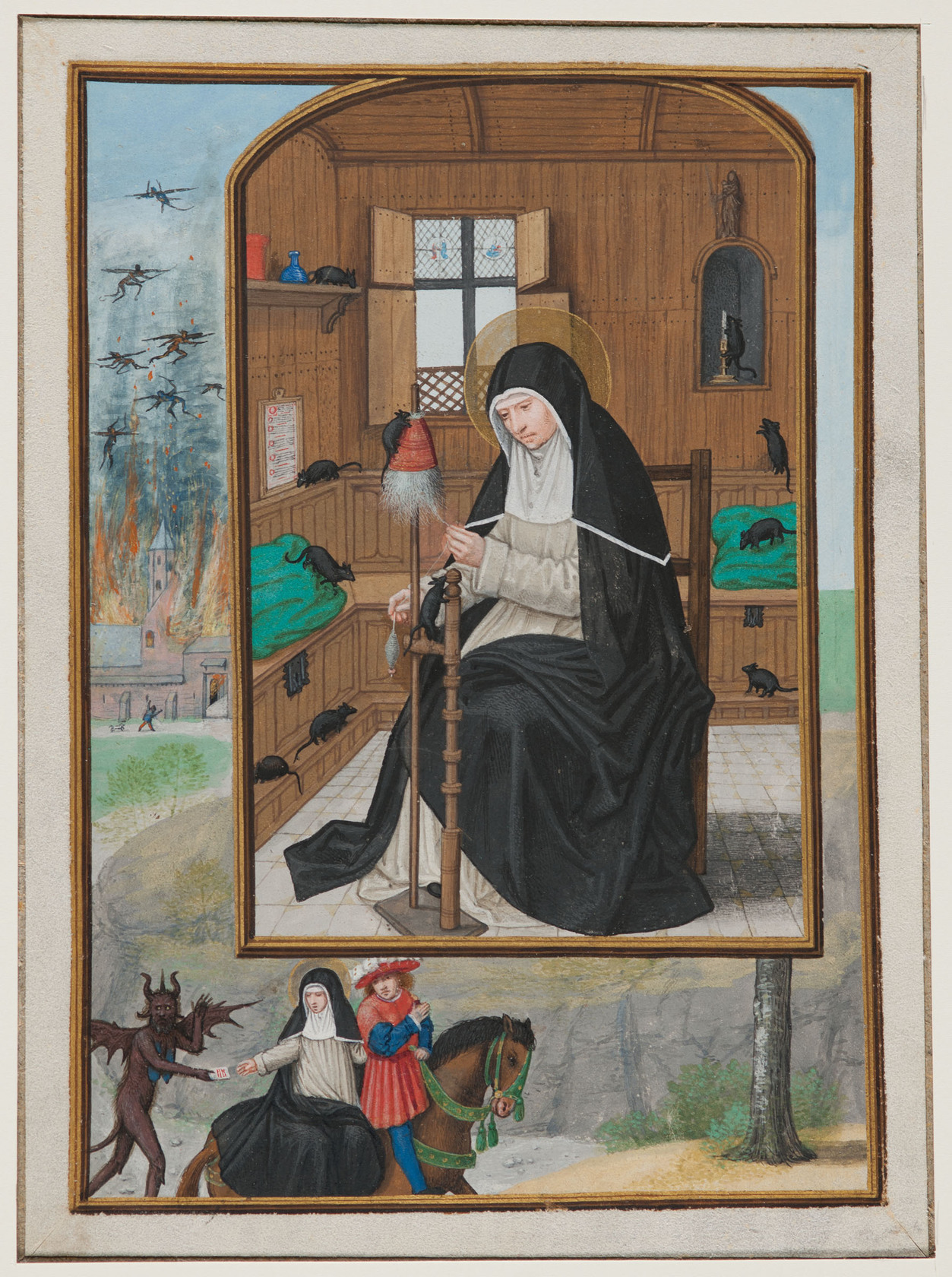
Saint Gertrude of Nivelles

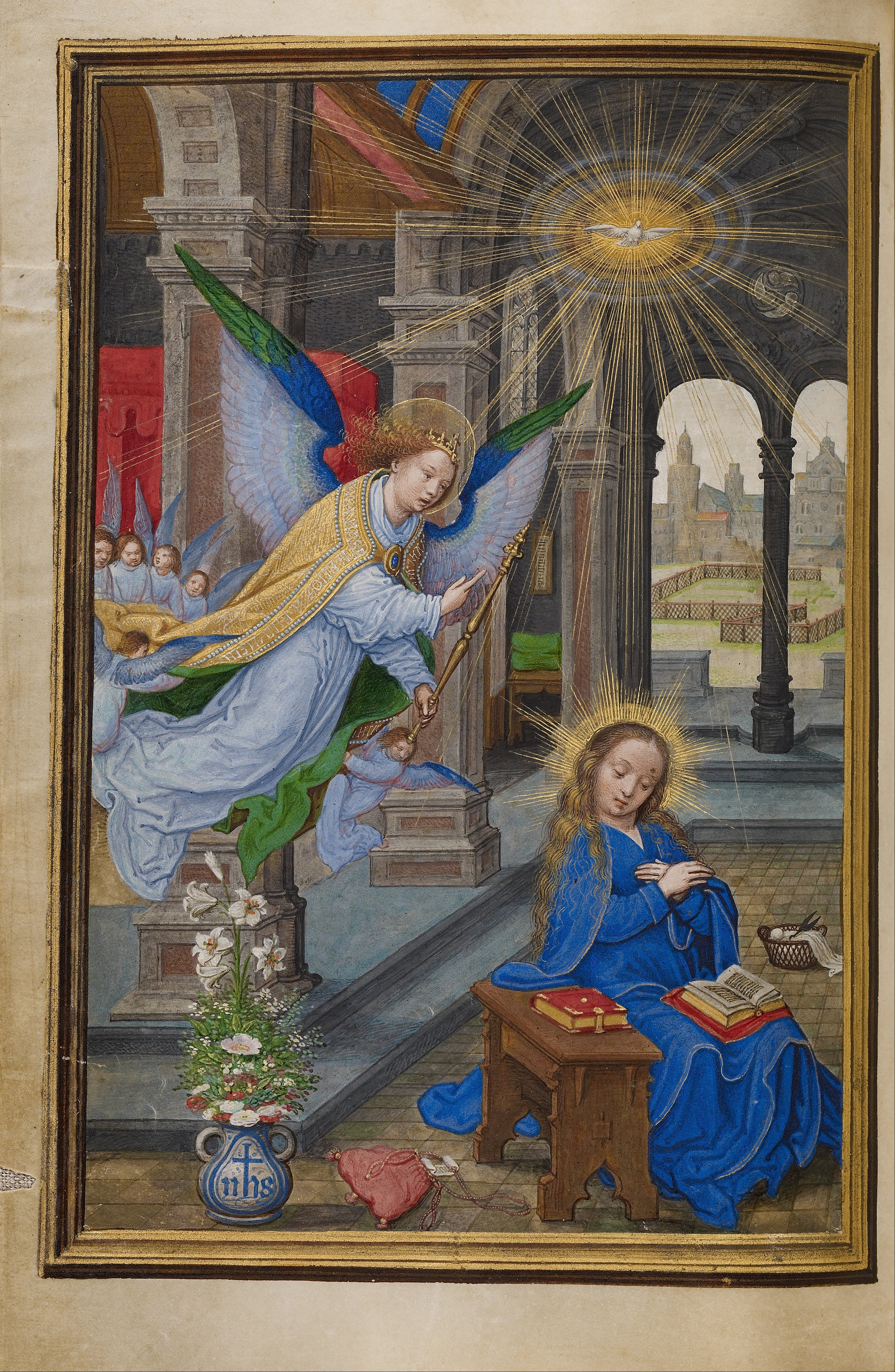
The Annunciation

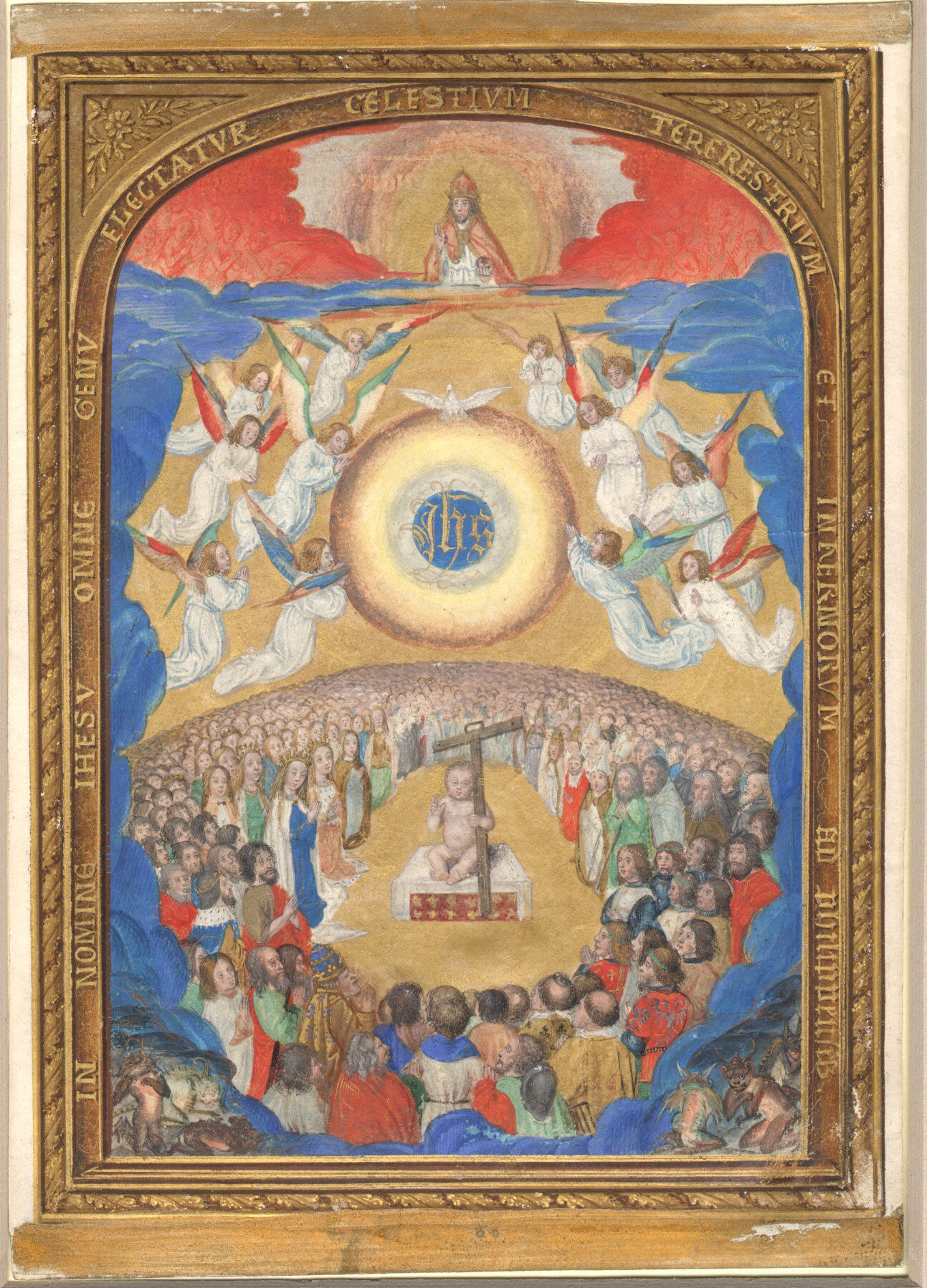
Manuscript Leaf with Adoration of the Holy Name, from a Book of Hours

== Sources ==
- Hindman, Sandra et al. Illuminations in the Robert Lehman Collection. New York: The Metropolitan Museum of Art, 1997.
- Morrison, Elizabeth and Kren, Thomas (eds). Flemish Manuscript Painting in Context. Los Angeles: J. Paul Getty Trust, 2006. ISBN 978-0-89236-852-5
