= Avenue Jean Médecin =

Street in the center of Nice, France

Coordinates: 43°42′02″N 7°16′05″E

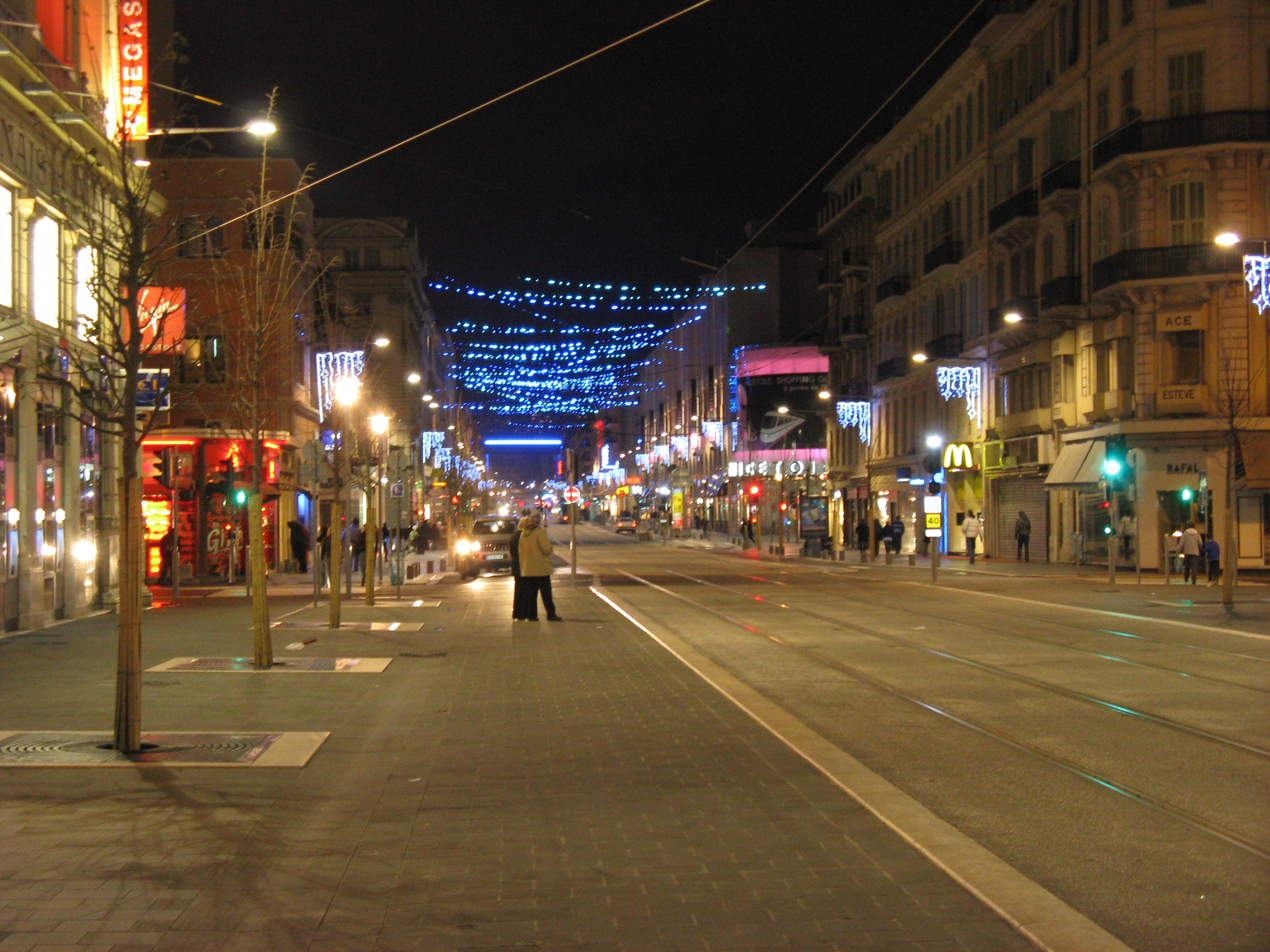
Avenue Jean Médecin and Yann Kersalé's L'amorse du bleu

The Avenue Jean Médecin is a street located in the center of Nice, one of the city's main north-south traffic arteries. In Niçard, it is officially named the "avenguda Jouan-Medecin, consòu de Nissa". It constitutes the city's main shopping street and is called "The Avenue" by residents.

== History ==
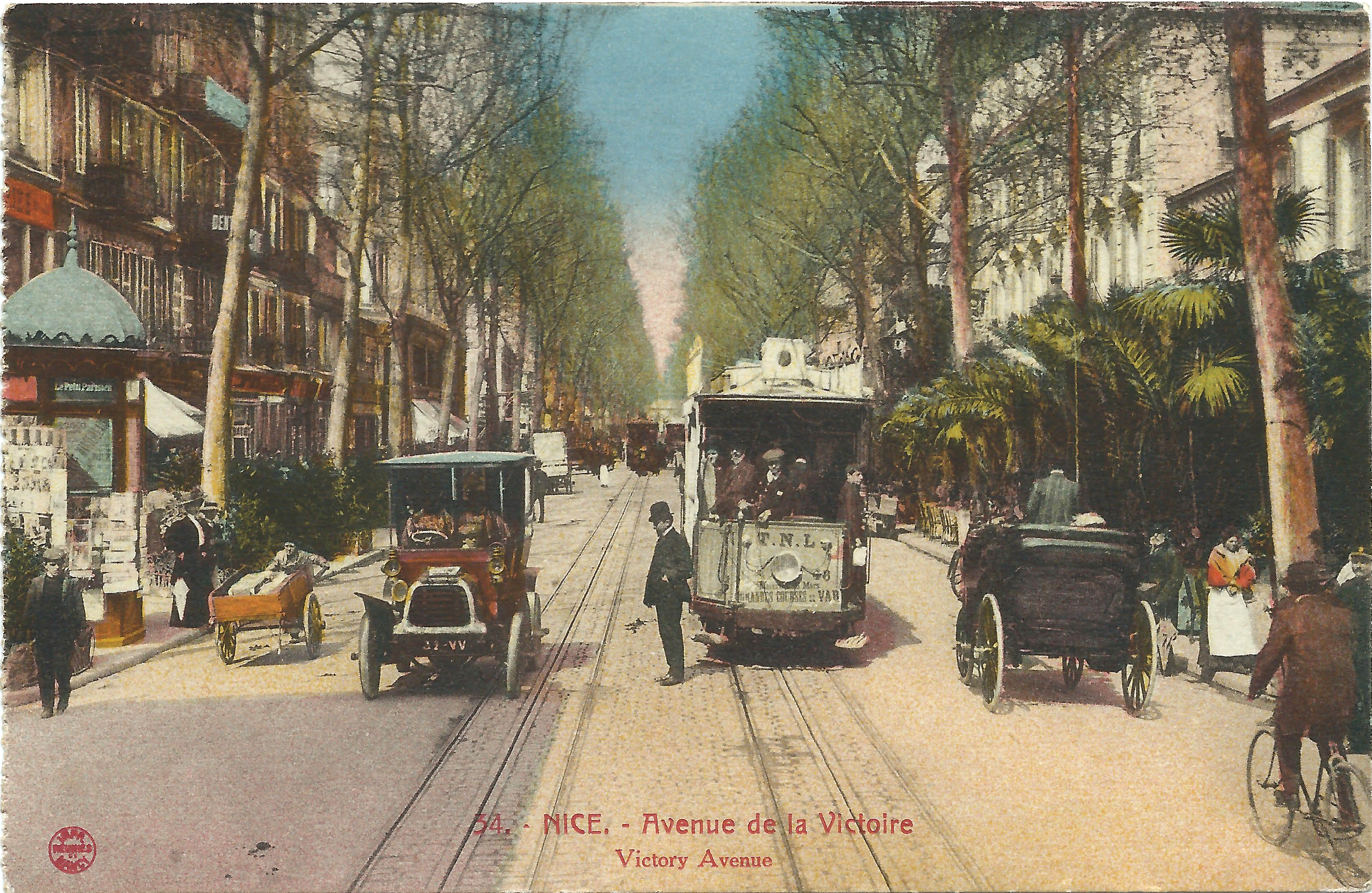
Postcard of the Avenue Jean Médecin, then Avenue de la Victoire (posted 1922)

Laid out in 1864 under the general plan of the Consiglio d'Ornato dating to the period when Nice was ruled by the Counts of Savoy, the street was constructed in a natural valley, the Saint-Michel Valley beginning at Place Masséna and lining up with the Pont-Neuf. It reflects the will of the authorities of this time to control development of the modern city on the right bank of the Paillon.

It is walking on this road in July 1947 that the first nine notes of the international song C'est si bon come to mind of the composer Henri Betti.

The street has had the following names:

- Saint-Michel Valley, prior to its construction
- Avenue du Prince-Impérial during the Second Empire, in honor of Louis Napoleon, the Prince Imperial; the government of Napoleon III had in fact participated in its construction
- Avenue de la Gare from 1870, since it was the main axis leading to the Nice-Ville station, which had opened in 1867
- Avenue de la Victoire from 1918, just after the First World War; the decision was made at a special city council meeting on Armistice Day
- Avenue Jean Médecin from 1966, in honor of Jean Médecin, who was mayor of Nice for thirty-three years during the twentieth century

== Description ==
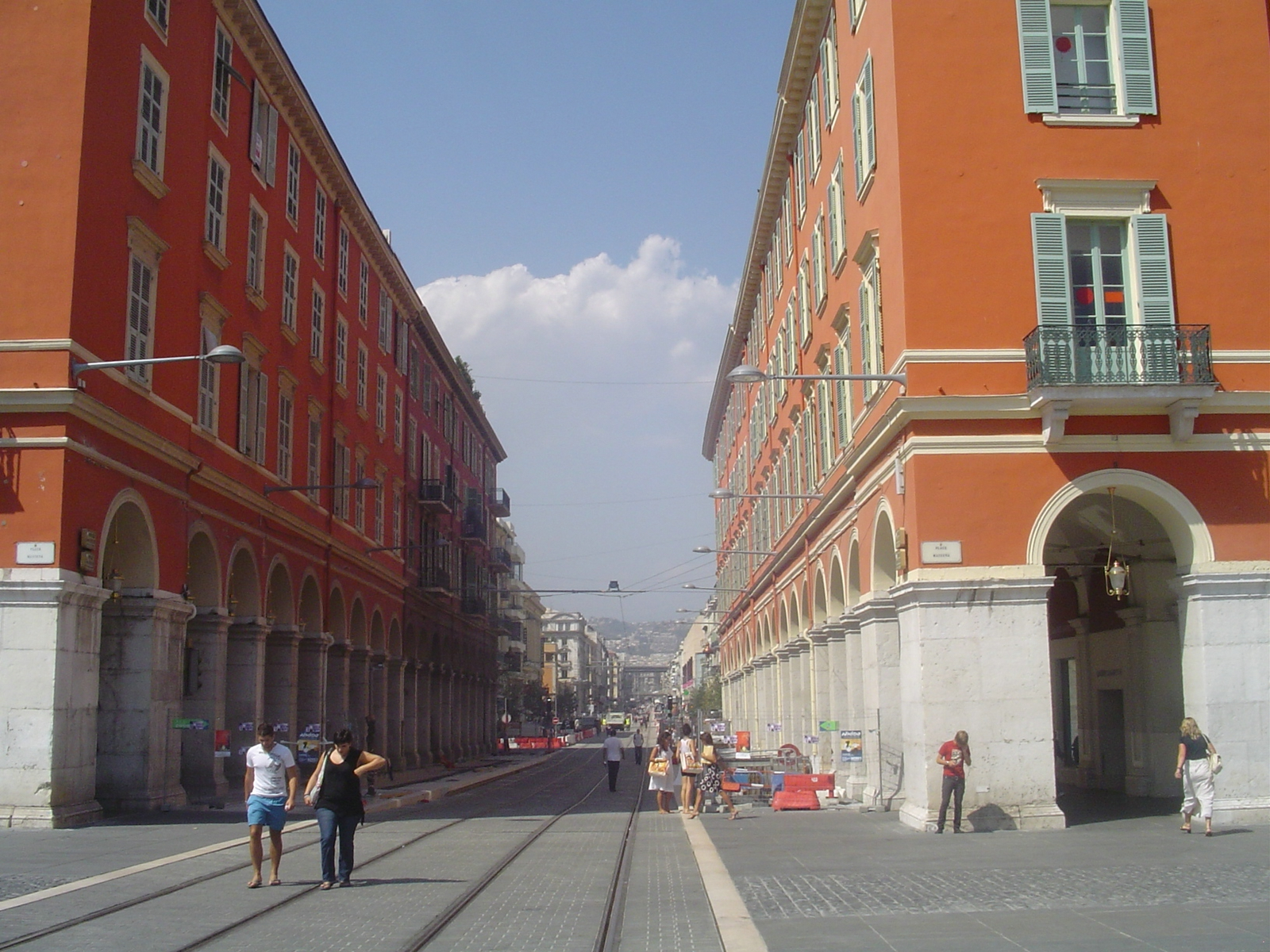
View north along the avenue from Place Masséna

The avenue runs north from Place Masséna to the Marseille–Ventimiglia railway, where it is continued by the Passage Max-Vérola passage, which runs under the viaduct carrying the rail line and Voie Mathis and merges into Avenue Malausséna, named after another former mayor of Nice. The streets leading north continue to follow the course of the natural valley, though the river now runs in an underground culvert beneath them. Avenue Jean Médecin intersects with several major east-west thoroughfares: Rue de la Liberté and Rue de l'Hôtel des Postes, Rue du Maréchal Joffre and Rue Pastorelli, Boulevard Victor-Hugo and Boulevard Dubouchage, Avenue Thiers and Boulevard Raimbaldi.

While the southern section of Avenue Jean Médecin is a tourist area, the northern section is more of a neighborhood artery. The same is true of the surrounding streets. On it are the main shops of the city, both for local residents and for tourists, and the Nice headquarters of the larger French banks: the Credit Lyonnais building, built in 1890 and designed by Sebastien-Marcel Biasini, the BNP Paribas building built in 1921 and designed by Charles Dalmas, and the famous branch of the Société Générale that was robbed by Albert Spaggiari in 1976.

The remainder of the avenue has a cinema, the Basilica of Notre-Dame, opened in 1868 and the site of a killing of three people in 2020, and the Nicetoile shopping center. Other buildings of architectural interest include the Belle Époque Riviera Building, built in 1913, six stories high and covering ten thousand square meters, which is currently occupied by Fnac and, somewhat south of that, a building in Art Deco style housing a branch of the Monoprix chain. At the southern end of the avenue is Galeries Lafayette, located here since 1916, in a building with a red ocher facade and arcades reminiscent of Turin.

From 2003 to 2007, Avenue Jean Médecin was subjected to lengthy construction work both under and above ground to install the Nice tramway. Since December 2008 it has been almost entirely a pedestrian street, the exception being the tramway. At night, the center of the avenue is decked with thousands of blue diodes. They are a work of public art called L'amorse du bleu, by light artist Yann Kersalé, which was inaugurated on the occasion of the completion of the tramway. The avenue is served by three tram stops for the T1 line, from north to south: Gare Thiers, Jean-Médecin, and Masséna, and one stop for the T2 line: Jean-Médecin.

The avenue for many years hosted the flower parades of the Nice Carnival; the floats paraded down the centre of the avenue to Place Masséna. This is no longer possible because of the tramway and its overhead electric wires.

== Gallery ==
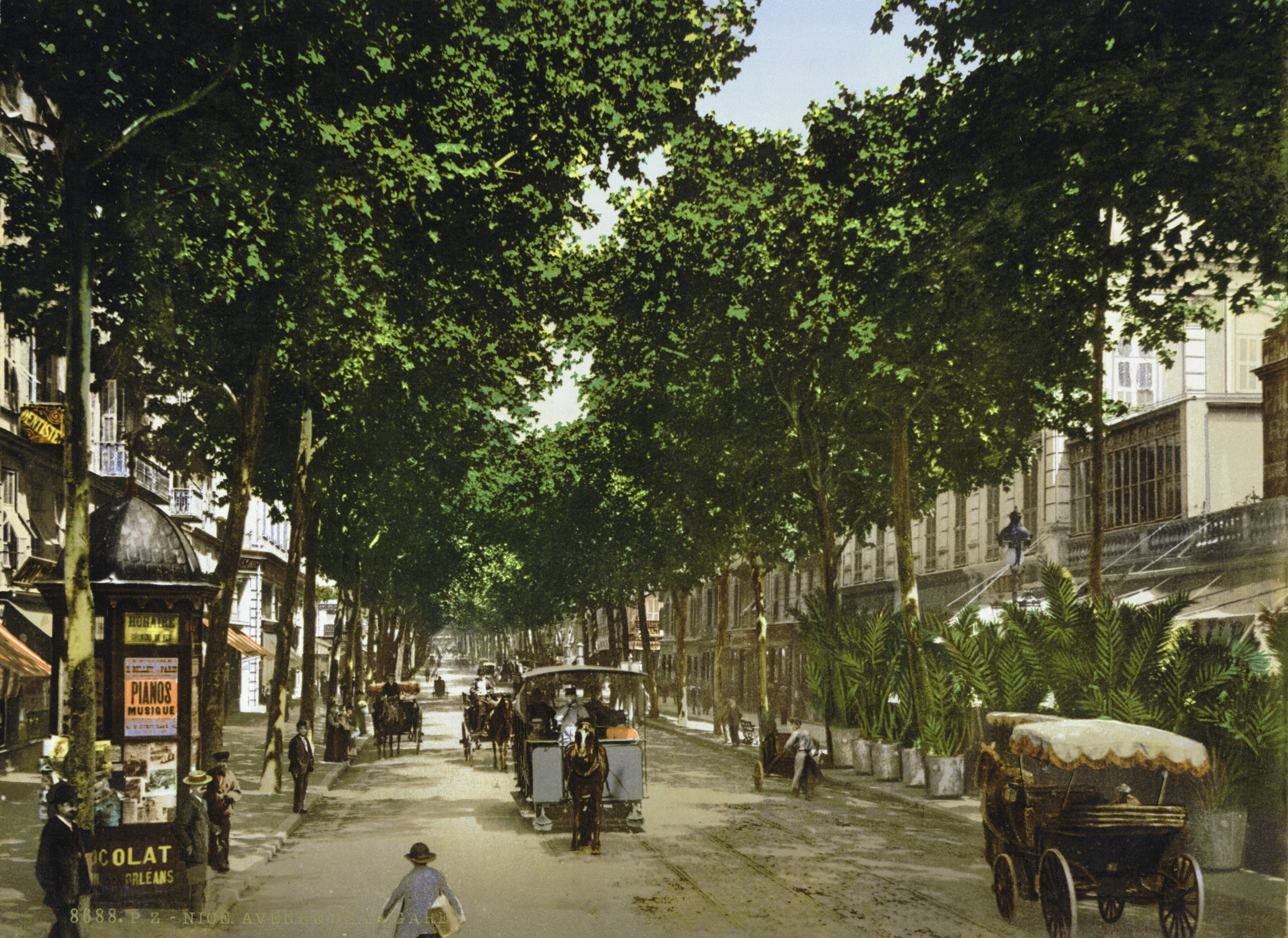
Avenue de la Gare at the turn of the 19th-20th centuries

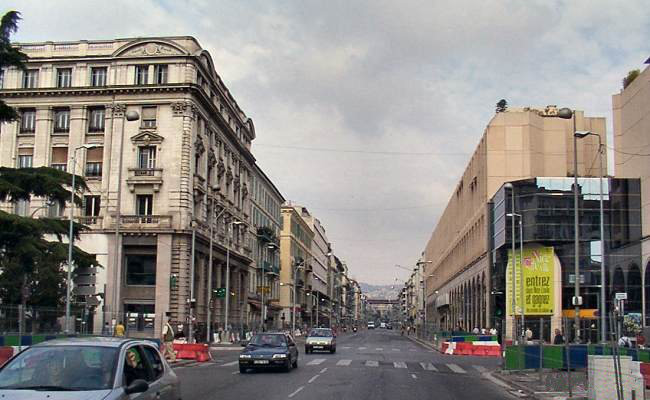
Early 21st century, before the tramway

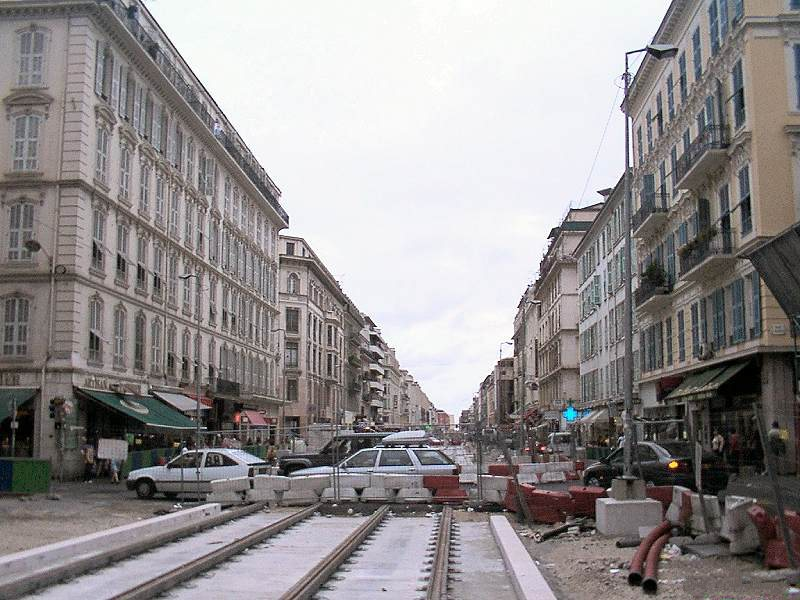
View to the south during construction of tramway

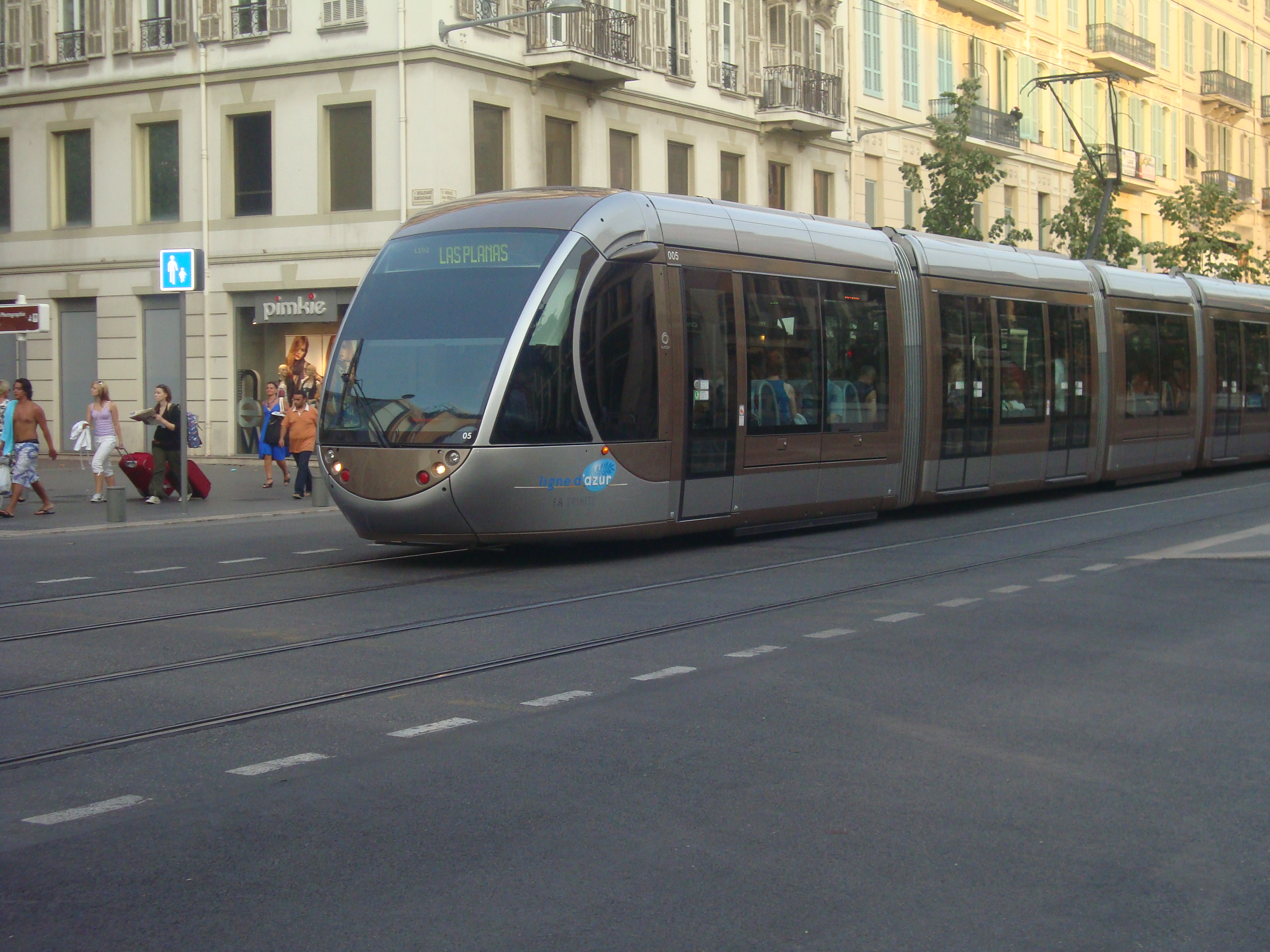
Tram on the avenue

== Sources ==
- Charles Paccino, preface by Jacques Médecin. L'Avenue. Nice: Serre, 1983. ISBN 2-86410-044-4 (in French)
