= SEA Signalisation =

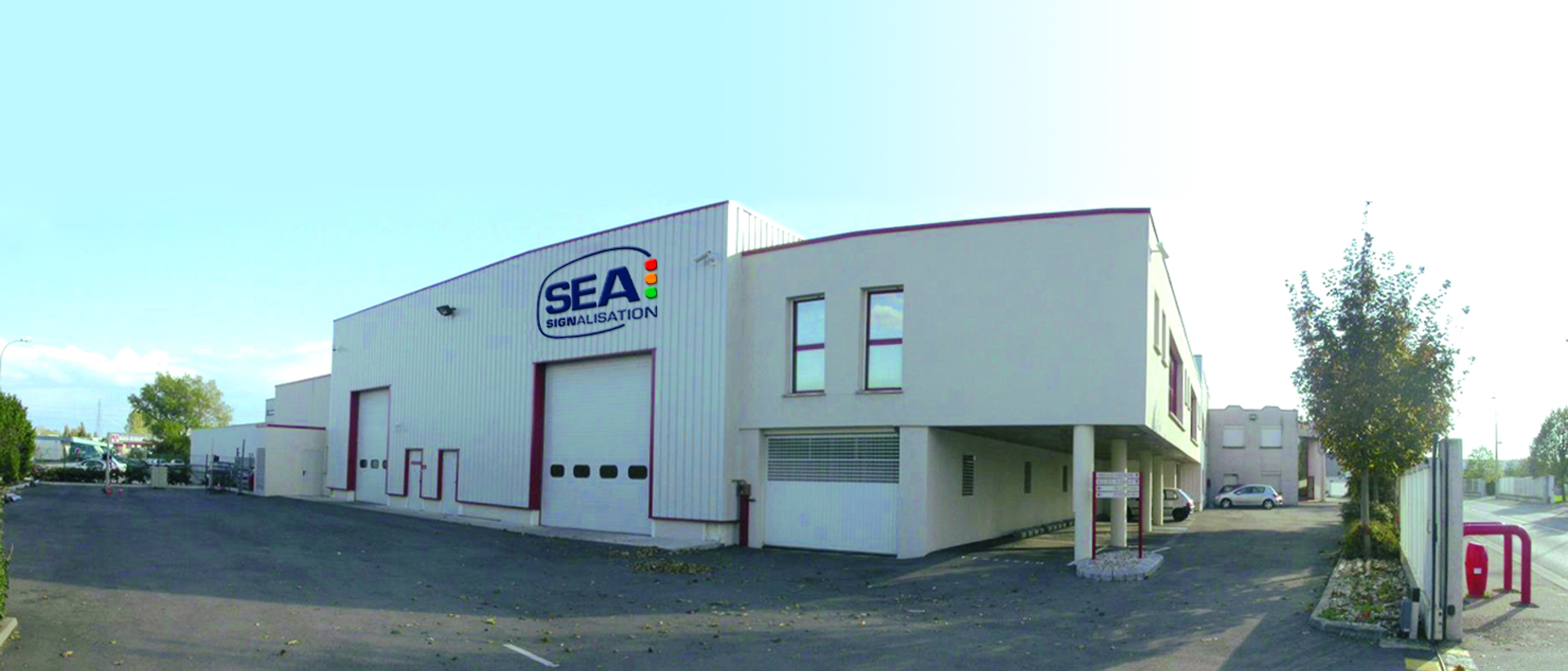
- Industry: Manufacturing
- Founded: 1947
- Headquarters: Vaulx-en-Velin
- Website: sea-signalisation.com

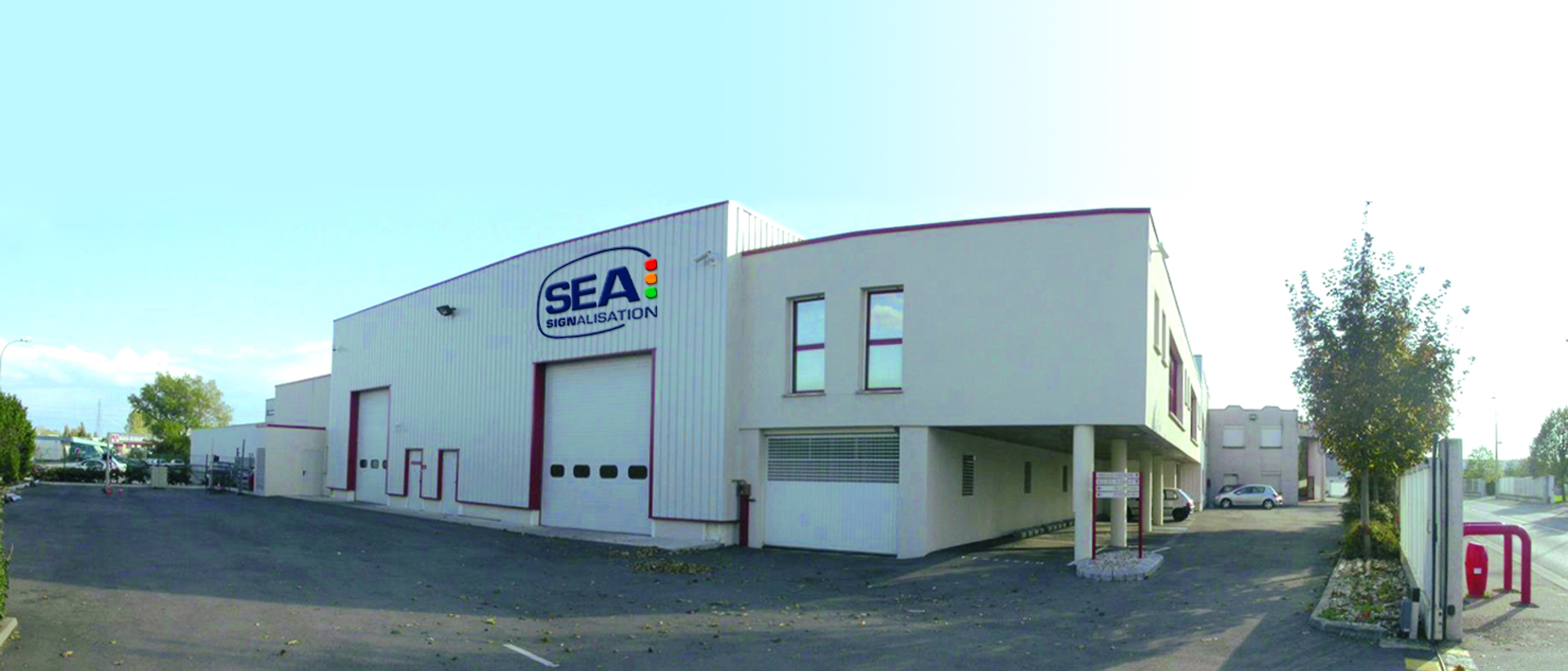
SEA Signalisation, Vaulx-en-Velin

SEA Signalisation is a French company that manufactures traffic lights.

== History ==
Leon Deloge steered the company toward the production of traffic lights and supplement products. He continued the business of his father, who founded the company Deloge and Dufresne in 1919, whose business was winding transformers and electric motors. The new company was named SEA Deloge and was officially registered in 1947.

The following year SEA Deloge develops a new range of equipment. A controller on a technological base "Dasphot" marked the starting point for SEA in the business of traffic regulation.

Specializing in traffic signaling, the company launched in 1960 electromechanical controllers under the trade name of BC "Block Chalier" that were sold in multiple copies throughout France.

In the 1970s, electronics enters the safety equipment. SEA Deloge creates and produces a family of controllers based on CMOS technology, an innovation for its time.

Horizon signals that were created in 1976 from a ball of dough, are long remained the best known brand of SEA.

The AR 2000, a programmable logic controller is placed on the market. Made in SEA Deloge, this controller has responded to the new traffic requirements (green wave two-way operation acyclic ...)

In 1986, AES became Deloge SEA signaling [ref. required]. In that year, the controller became AR 2000 LP 2200. The following year, LEDs emerged on the market. SEA signaling produced signals 100 and R12 with the new technology.

SEA signaling is the first manufacturer to offer a coherent solution with very low voltage sources TBT. Certainly, this technology has not sold in its infancy because of a strong lobbying imposing the optical source fluorescent (1988–1989).

In 1993, SEA Launches Signaling Controller CLP 700 - the first controller in France based on an industrial PC card based on Intel 286, with a user-friendly programming software for multi-window. This programming mode allowed to apply a new methodology for the operation controllers of traffic lights.

Two years later, the company built a new plant in Vaulx-en-Velin and brings to market a new product line antivandalismes to address the problem of damage to the furniture.

Between 1997 and 1999, 'SEA Signaling' develops the controller CLP 7700 by adding a CPU, built around an Intel 386 EX associated with flash memory. The operating system TOPS has been updated without changing components.

In the period 1998–2004, SEA signaling continues to develop optical TBT. During this period the company is working on T1 and T2 tramway in Lyon. In 2000–2001, SEA brings to market two new product lines: AXEL and AGATHE. In 2007, the start of a line of prestige: NIXEA a new concept. The prestigious line NIXEA appears in 2007, it was specially developed to provide luxury and design of light-signaling.

== Scope of application ==
Light signals have an important role in managing the movement in urban space. 'SEA Signalisation' produces light signals intersection, programmable controllers, and provide expertise in areas such as:

1. Traffic control:

- in urban areas;
- in rural areas.

2. Transit (Ex. TCSP - transit in dedicated lanes):

- Tram;
- Bus (e.g. BRT - Bus Rapid service);

3. Accessibility for people with visual impairments.

4. Other areas:

- Ski (ski lifts to the regulation);

== Controllers and regulations ==
Controllers signalized intersections, certified SETRA (Service engineering roads and motorway), serve to ensure the perfect traffic control as needed, ensuring the safety of motorists and pedestrians.

Specialized software, such as TOPS software (Optimized Processing Parameters Signalling) to optimize the flow of junctions controlled by traffic lights, whether simple or complex. DIASER

Some examples of specific regulations:

- Green wave;
- Green rewarded;
- Red sanction.

== Standards and regulations ==
In France and in Europe there are strict standards and regulations on road safety. Interministerial Instruction on road signs. Sixth Part: Traffic lights permanent (version November 2008).

Order of 10 April 2009 amending the Decree of 24 November 1967 on Signs of roads and highways.

Order of 24 November 1967 on the signing roads and highways.

== Specific achievements ==
- Nice tramway,
- Grenoble tramway,
- Saint-Etienne Tramway,
- Nancy tramway,
- Tram Clermont-Ferrand,
- Tramway in Rabat-Sale,
- Mulhouse tramway,
- Lyon tramway (T1, T2, T3 and T4) and its extensions to Saint-Priest and Montrochet - Focus on bus line C1, C2, C3 Lyon

Also Bus priority Belfort, etc.

== Sources ==
www.sea-signalisation.fr
