= 1979 Nice tsunami =

Tsunami in Nice, France

Coordinates: 43.6464°N 7.2157°E

The Nice tsunami of 1979 came on October 16. Two tsunamis struck the coast near Nice, accompanied by a landslide at the Nice Airport, and an aseismic submarine landslide. The two waves struck the coast between the Italian border and the town of Antibes (60 miles; 96 km). They reached 3 m high near Nice and 3.5 m at La Salis (Antibes) and decreased in amplitude from there.

== Causes ==
The origin of these events has been a subject of academic and judicial debate. One hypothesis said that it was the landslide at the Nice airport; while the other stated that it was an underwater landslide.

A 0.15 km^{3} slide took place off Nice airport while constructing the fill of the new airport, perhaps as a consequence of this work. This landslide would have caused the first tsunami. The material from this slide could have caused a submarine slide that would have caused the second tsunami.

In the second hypothesis, the major natural submarine landslide (~8.7 km^{2}) that occurred offshore Nice caused a tsunami which would have caused a landslide of the fill of the new airport. This landslide caused another tsunami.

== Consequences ==
Casualty estimates range between 8 and 23. At the construction site, the collapsing fill killed seven people.

The tsunamis inundated a 20-mile section of the coast. The water travelled up to 150 m inland. Eleven people were swept away in Nice and one in Antibes. The airport works were finished, but this event forestalled the construction of a new port for Nice.
