= Yann Kersalé =

French conceptual artist (born 1955)

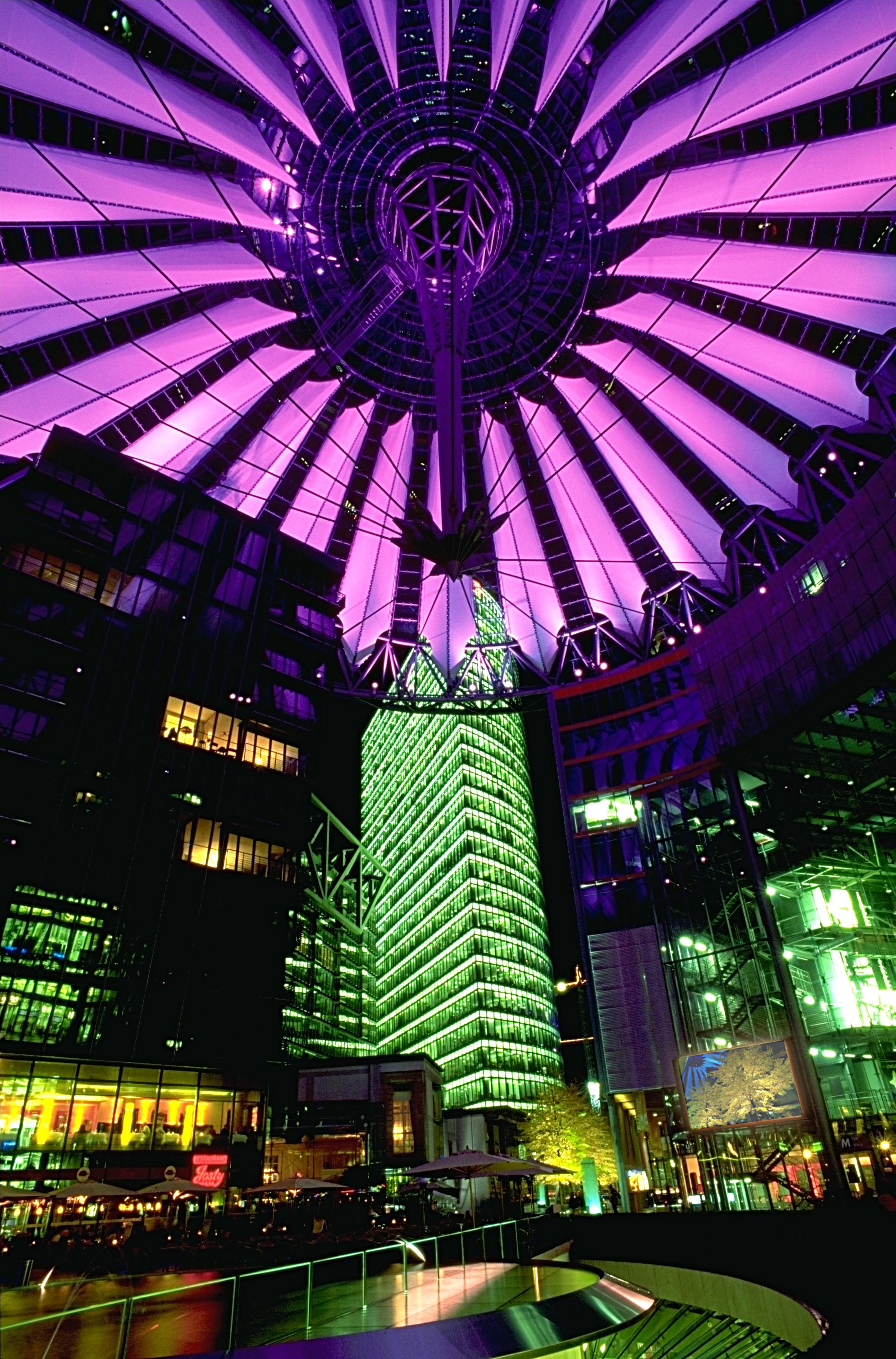
Sony Center, Berlin, atrium during sunset sequence; lighting design by Yann Kersalé

Yann Kersalé (born 17 February 1955) is a French conceptual artist who works with light. His studio is in Vincennes.

== Life and career ==
Kersalé was born in Boulogne-Billancourt, (Note: Some sources, for example the biography in L'Art dans la ville: avec le tramway Nice – Côte d'Azur, Communauté Nice-Côte d'Azur, cached 27 April 2008 (pdf) (in French) p. 24, state his birthplace as Paris.) a suburb of Paris, and spent part of his childhood in the Breton port town of Douarnenez. He graduated from the École des Beaux-Arts in Quimper in 1978. Beginning in 1984 at the Société métallurgique in Caen, he has produced architectural illuminations of both natural environments and buildings that have given rise to a school of modern French light art. He has worked with Helmut Jahn on the Sony Center in Berlin and the Bangkok and Chicago O'Hare airports and with Jean Nouvel on the Lyon Opera House, the Torre Agbar in Barcelona, the Musée du quai Branly, the Philharmonie concert hall in Paris, and the Abu Dhabi branch of the Louvre Museum. He has also been commissioned to design projects for numerous cities, including Nantes, Rennes, Saint-Nazaire, Le Havre, Cherbourg, Bordeaux, and Montpellier in France and Bangkok, Quebec City, Frankfurt, Berlin, Las Vegas, Washington, DC, Lisbon, Brussels, and St Petersburg in other countries. In 2007 alone, he worked in Luxembourg, Paris, and Korea.

He has also produced an interior lighting scheme for the Francilien commuter trains, and in 2010 the Jallum lighting units for Baccarat, rechargeable and dimmable LED lights in cut crystal cylinders on anodised aluminium bases for indoor or outdoor use.

== Artistic philosophy ==
Kersalé rejects the label of either architect or light artist, preferring that of "project artist". He has chosen the night, "the locus of choice of what is perceived", to create "luminous fictions, a narrative work on the spirit and memory of cities." However, he "fights ceaselessly against artificial lighting that kills authentic nocturnality and masks the sky", which has led him to create innovative new forms of illumination. In 2011, a reviewer in Le Figaro called him "a passionate fan of chiaroscuro" who loves to plunge viewers into an "abyss" of total darkness to maximise their perception of the surprising narrative fantasies he constructs with light.

He regards his work for cities as a form of urban renewal, reclaiming areas where people can stroll safely at night, and saving industrial artifacts that might otherwise be destroyed. For example, his lighting of the boat lifts at Thieu, Belgium, led to their preservation and the creation of a tourist promenade, and his project at the submarine base in Saint-Nazaire transformed a liability that was to have been demolished into a civic asset. The base is now a cultural centre with shops and a museum, and Barcelona architect Manuel de Solà-Morales redesigned the surrounding area.

== Selected works ==
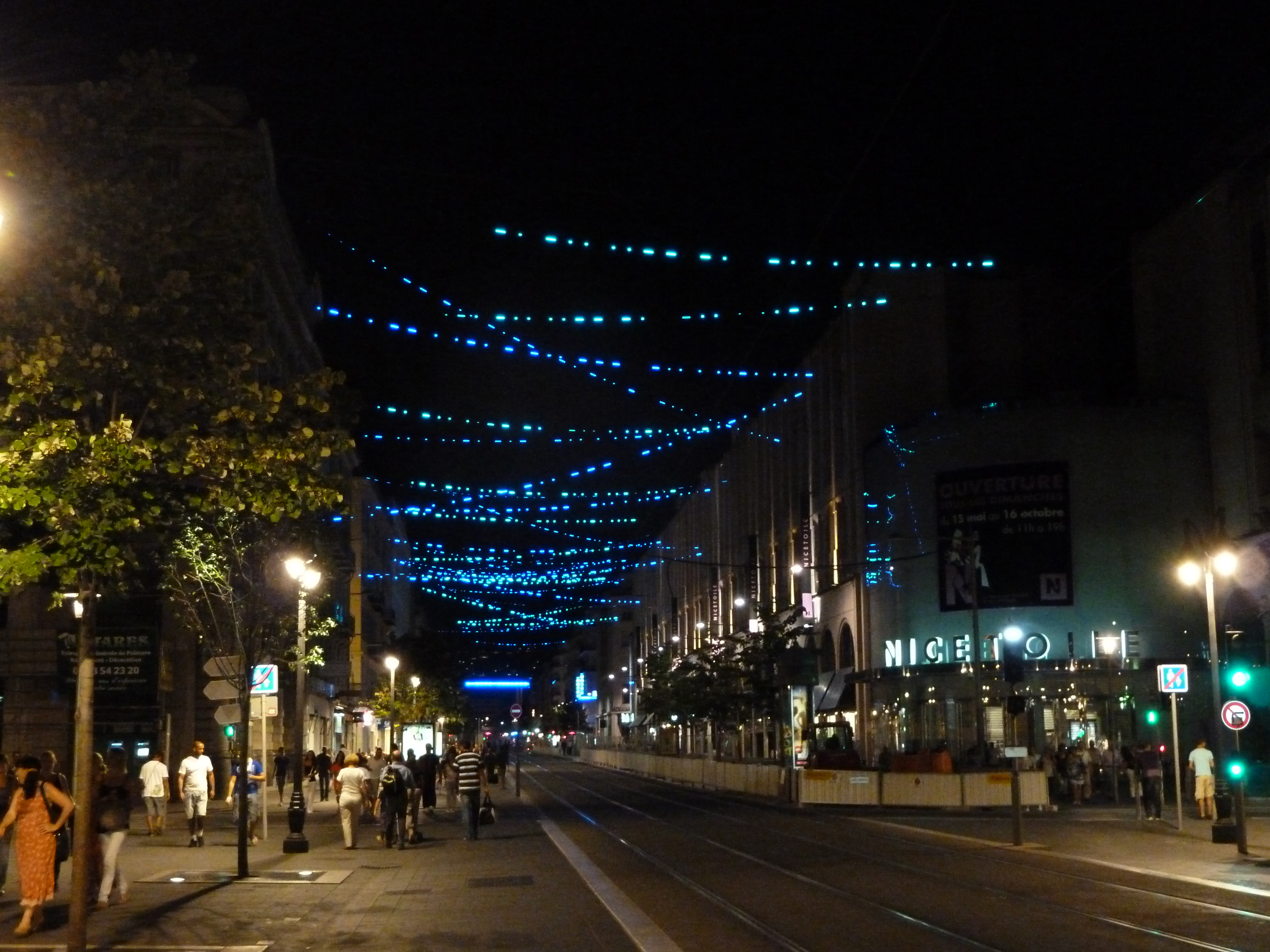
L'amorse du bleu, installation on Avenue Jean Médecin in Nice

=== Temporary installations ===
- Le songe est de rigueur, Pointe de la Torche, Finistère, 1986. Computerised projection of light patterns on the ocean in response to "the movements of the tides, the currents, the wind and so forth" against "a set of stranded, wide-eyed, steel megaliths". Kersalé describes it in an interview as intended as "a kind of encephalogram of the sea". It was filmed by Henri Alekan under the subtitle Structures de lumière.
- Irréversibles lumières, Grand Palais, Paris, 1987. Blue fluorescent lighting inside the glass dome waxing and waning forty times a minute to produce the effect of a beating heart or a respiring lung, while the metal framing the glass was picked out in white.
- Convergence, Grand Place, Brussels, 2008. Illumination as part of the European Cultural Season, organised by invitation by the French government, using 2,209 LED modules (106,032 LEDs) to produce an inverted dome of lights over the square, to transform it into "an immense open-roofed ballroom".

=== Permanent installations ===
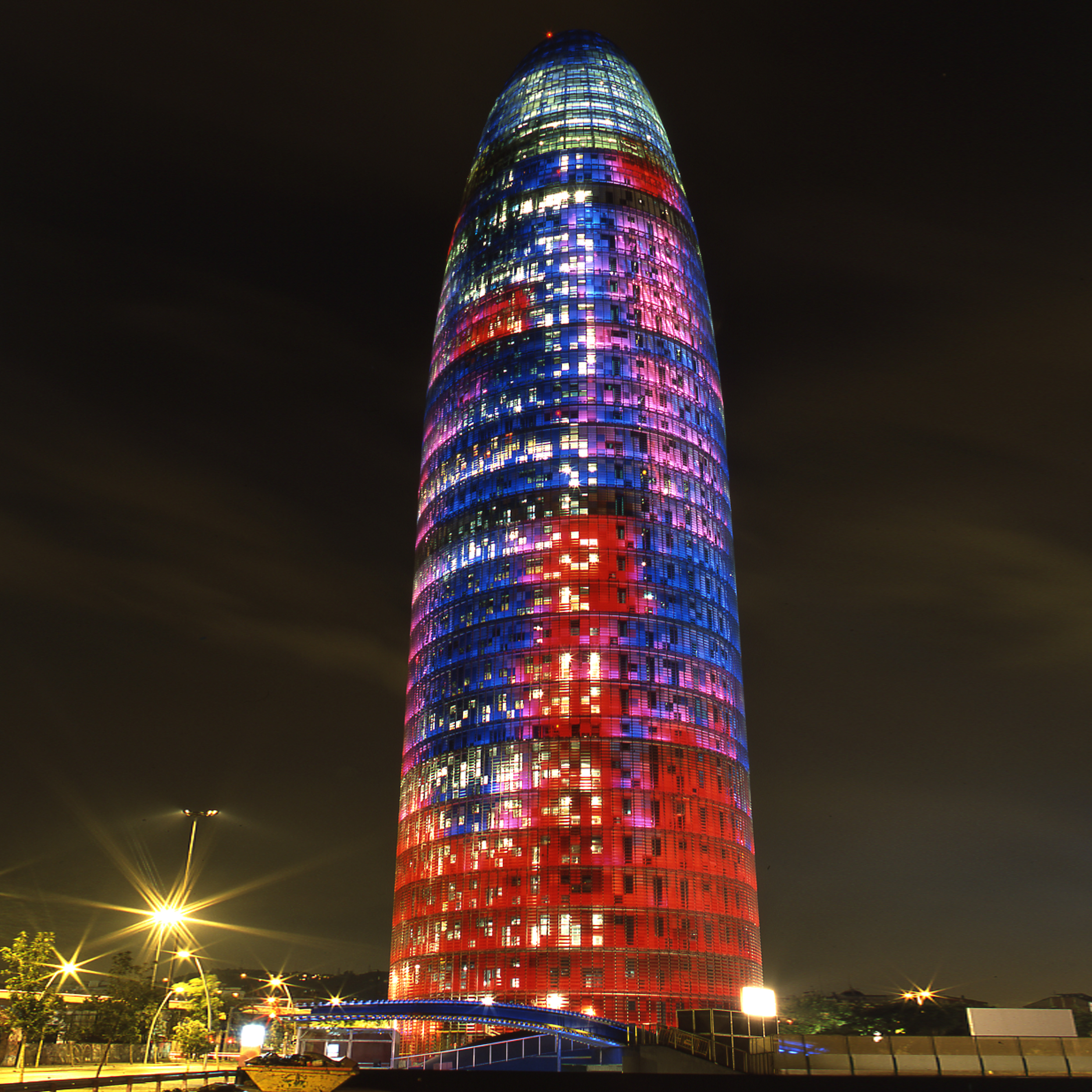
Torre Agbar, Barcelona, in September 2005.

- Nuit des docks, Saint-Nazaire, 1991. Night-time illumination of the docks, including a submarine base, in bright colours determined by analysis of the activity during the day. The project, commissioned by the mayor, transformed the ugly military installation and site of unpleasant memories, which had been slated for demolition, into a civic asset. Kersalé cited a grandmother saying, "I would never have been able to imagine such a beautiful thing from such a horror."
- In Out, Sony Center, Berlin, 2000. Illumination of the atrium roof in a series of simulated sunsets approximately 21 seconds in duration from sunset to midnight; during the rest of the night the lighting is dark blue, except for bright white light preceding sunrise and also preceding sunset.
- Diffraction, Torre Agbar, Barcelona, 2005. Exterior illumination of the office tower built by Jean Nouvel causes it to "glow at night as a colorful monolith". Lighting patterns are created by 4,500 panels each containing 18 LEDs, which can create 255 degrees of intensity and over 16 million hues, each panel independently controlled by a computer responding to 20,000 inputs including weather conditions and building systems. The tower "vibrates in a play of primary and complementary colours." Kersalé has described the lighting as "a vaporous cloud of colour that seeks moiré". The lighting is installed between the building's façade and its glass skin; the lighted windows of people still at work contribute to the effect.
- L'Ô, Musée du quai Branly, Paris, 2006: with Jean Nouvel and landscape architect Gilles Clément. A 'lake' of 1,600 translucent rods that change colour between white and deep turquoise in response to the temperature recorded at a weather station are planted among the grasses and reeds in the museum gardens. The project title is a pun on l'eau, water, in reference to the primordial currents that lie beneath all human cultures; the museum houses indigenous art from all over the world.
- L'amorse du bleu, Avenue Jean Médecin, Nice, 2008. Blue diodes in the form of Morse code strung over the avenue; one of the 15 public art commissions, L'Art dans la ville, awarded by competition in 2004 in association with the construction of the Nice tramway. Kersalé's intent was "to create a vault of calm blue suspended in the air, in opposition to the density of the activity on the ground".

== Sources ==
=== Works by Yann Kersalé ===
- Yann Kersalé. Paris: Gallimard, 2008. ISBN 978-2-07-012280-6 (in French)
- Manière Noire: Géopoétique du paysage. Paris: Une & l'autre, 2008. ISBN 978-2-35729-014-3 (in French)
- Lumière matière. DVD, 80 mins. Ecole centrale des arts et manufactures (Châtenay-Malabry, Hauts-de-Seine) Atelier audiovisuel, 2009. OCLC 690390144

=== Works by others ===
- Jean-Louis Pradel. Yann Kersalé: Lumière matière. Collection Archipels. Paris: BaS, 1990. ISBN 978-2-908474-01-5 (in French)
- Philippe Curval. Yann Kersalé. In association with the exhibit "Expédition Lumière", 27 April – 10 July 1994 at Espace Electra. Monotypes. [Paris]: Hazan, 1994. ISBN 978-2-85025-382-9
- Philippe Curval with Yann Kersalé. Yann Kersalé: Expéditions lumière / Light Expeditions. Catalogue. Paris: Enrico Navarra Gallery, 1995. OCLC 52349752
- Jean-Paul Curnier, Henri-Pierre Jeudy, Monique Sicard and Eric Germain, with translations by Jean-Hugues de Vandière. Yann Kersalé: Light for Landmarks / Structures lumière. Paris: Norma, 2003. ISBN 978-2-909283-82-1
- Vincent Laganier. Lumières architecturales en France. Scéno +. Paris: AS, 2004. ISBN 978-2-912017-25-3 (in French)
- John Rockwell. "Paris After Sundown: With Gallic Subtlety, Even More Light". New York Times. 5 September 1994.
