= Cagnes-sur-Mer station =

Railway station in Cagnes-sur-Mer, France

Cagnes-sur-Mer
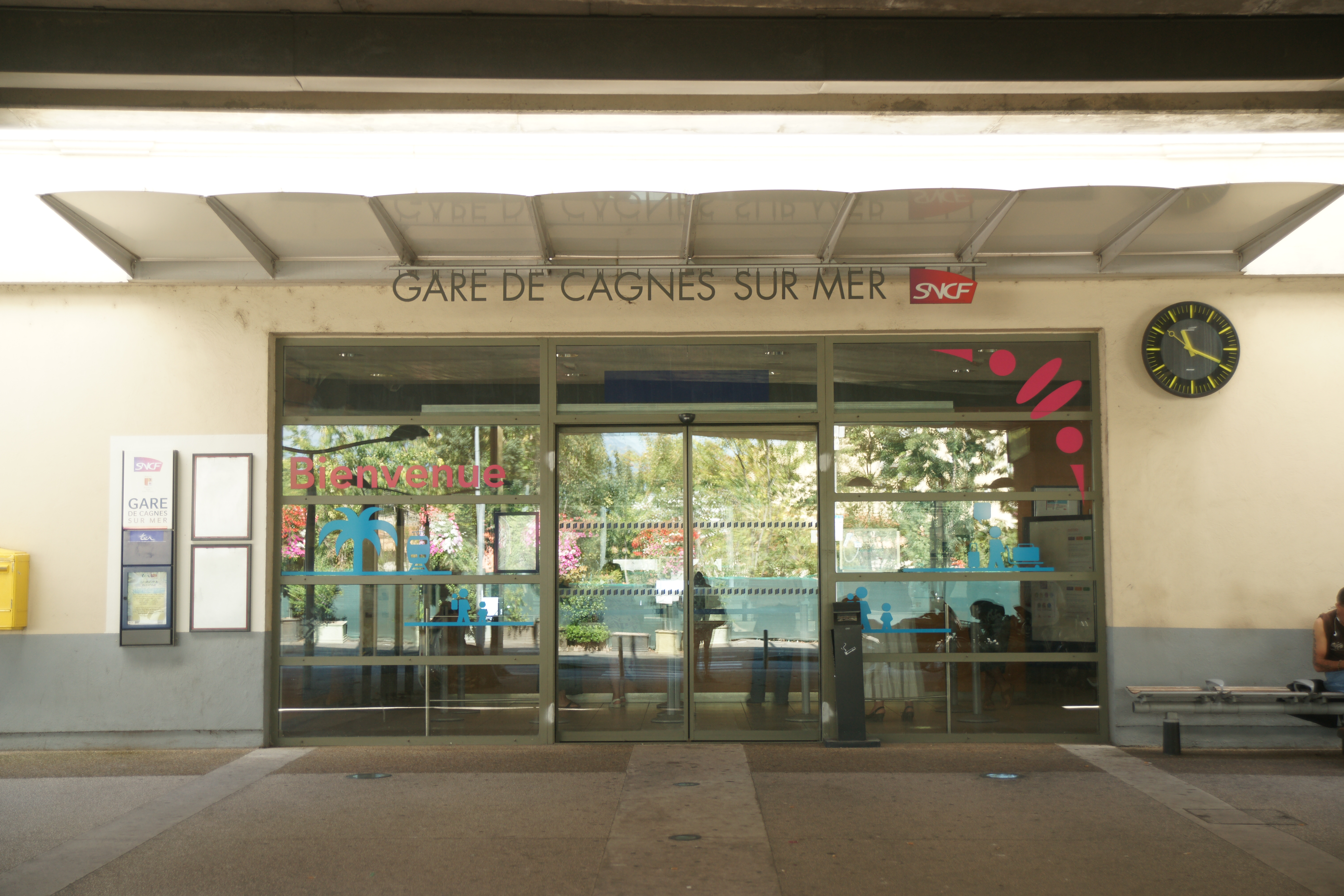
- Gare de Cagnes-sur-Mer

General information
- Location: Cagnes-sur-Mer
- Coordinates: 43°39′28″N 7°8′53″E
- Owner: RFF
- Operator: SNCF
- Lines: TER, Corail
- Platforms: 2
- Tracks: 3

Other information
- Station code: 87756320

Passengers
- 2024: 1,609,844

Services
Preceding station	TER PACA	Following station
Antibes towards Les Arcs–Draguignan	3	Saint-Laurent-du-Var towards Nice
Villeneuve-Loubet-Plage towards Mandelieu-la-Napoule or Grasse	4	Cros-de-Cagnes towards Ventimiglia
Location

Gare de Cagnes-sur-Mer is a railway station serving Cagnes-sur-Mer, Alpes-Maritimes department, southeastern France. It is located on the Marseille–Ventimiglia railway, between Cannes and Nice. The station is served by regional trains (TER Provence-Alpes-Côte d'Azur) to Cannes, Grasse, Antibes and Nice.
