= Nice-Saint-Augustin station =

Railway station in Nice, France

Nice Saint-Augustin
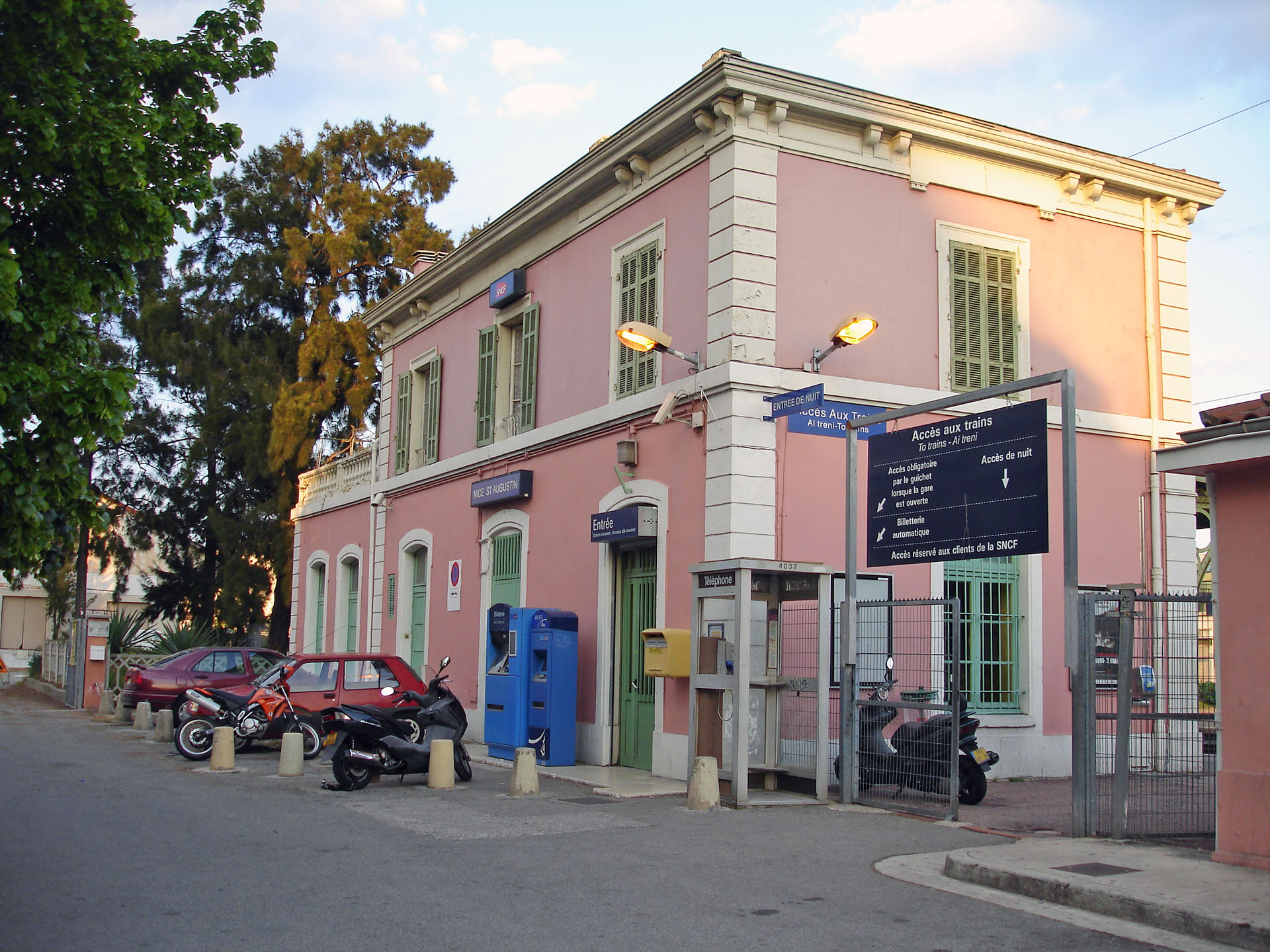

General information
- Location: Nice; France
- Coordinates: 43.6708°N 7.2164°E
- Line: Marseille-Ventimiglia
- Platforms: 2
- Tracks: 2
- Train operators: TER PACA
- Connections: Nice Tramway (from 2019)

Construction
- Parking: No
- Cycle facilities: Yes
- Accessible: No

Other information
- Station code: 87756254

Key dates
- 1864: Station Opened
- 2019: Tramway Interchange opened

Passengers
- 2024: 2,414,208

Services
Preceding station	TER PACA	Following station
Saint-Laurent-du-Var towards Les Arcs–Draguignan	3	Nice-Ville Terminus
Saint-Laurent-du-Var towards Mandelieu-la-Napoule or Grasse	4	Nice-Ville towards Ventimiglia
Antibes towards Marseille	6	Nice-Ville Terminus
Location

Nice St-Augustin station (French: Gare de Nice St-Agustin) is a train station on the line from Marseille to Ventimiglia, situated in Nice, in the department of Alpes-Maritimes in the region of Provence-Alpes-Côte d'Azur, France. The station is located close to Nice Côte d'Azur Airport (10 minutes on foot); it is a 5 minute journey from Nice Ville by TER.

== History ==
The station was moved 400 meters west of its original location on 1 September 2022, to allow connection with lines 2 and 3 of the Nice Tramway, thus providing a direct link to Nice Airport, as well as with bus lines. The new 125 m^{2} passenger building is made of wood, with a pergola, and can be completely dismantled. The total cost of the railway station was 19 million euros.

== Services ==
As of 2022, the station is only served by TER with services eastbound towards Nice, Menton and Ventimiglia, and westbound services towards Cannes, Grasse, Draguignan and Marseille.

== Multimodal ==
The station is located besides the Nice Tramway Lines 2&3, the latter of which, opening as of late 2019. The Tramway provides direct connections to Nice Airport and into Nice City Centre through tunnelled Tram Operations

== See also ==
- List of SNCF stations in Provence-Alpes-Côte d'Azur
