= Nice Côte d'Azur Airport =

Airport serving Nice, France

Nice Côte d'Azur Airport Aéroport Nice Côte d'Azur

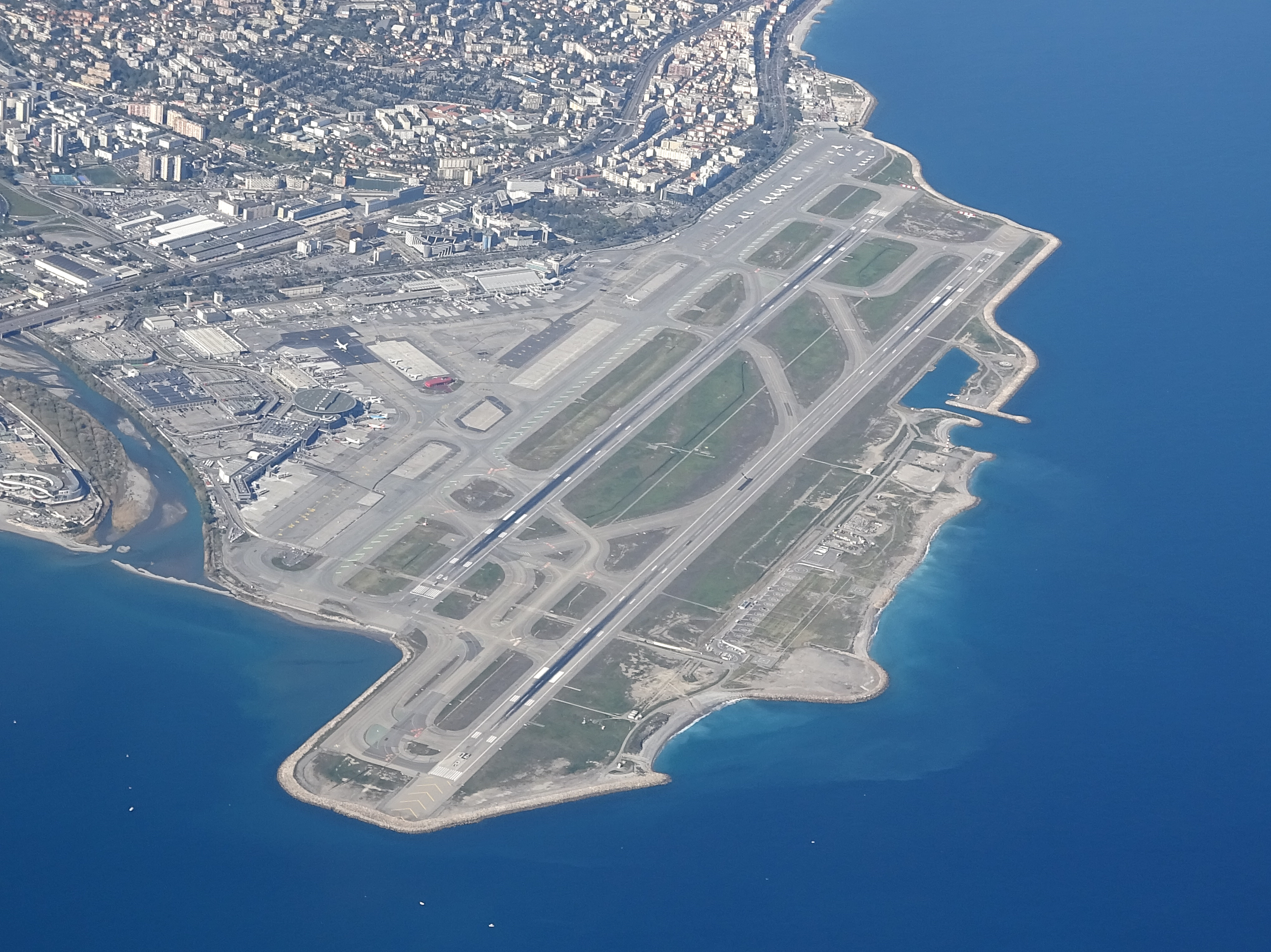
- IATA: NCE; ICAO: LFMN

Summary
- Airport type: Public
- Owner: Mundys
- Operator: Aéroports de la Côte d'Azur (ACA)
- Serves: Nice and Côte d'Azur (France and Monaco)
- Focus city for: Air France; easyJet
- Elevation AMSL: 4 m (13 ft)
- Coordinates: 43°39′55″N 007°12′54″E
- Website: en.nice.aeroport.fr

Map
- Airport in Provence-Alpes-Côte d'Azur region NCE/LFMN (France)

Runways
| Direction | Length | | Surface |
| Direction | m | ft | Surface |
|---|---|---|---|
| 04L/22R | 2,570 | 8,432 | Asphalt concrete |
| 04R/22L | 2,960 | 9,711 | Asphalt concrete |

Helipads
| Number | Length | | Surface |
| Number | m | ft | Surface |
|---|---|---|---|
| H1 | 29.25 | 96 | Asphaltic concrete |
| H2 | 29.25 | 96 | Asphaltic concrete |

Statistics (2025)
- Passengers: 15,229,664
- Passenger traffic change: ▲3.2%
- Aircraft movements: 172,949
- Aircraft movements change: ▲2.1%
- Airport data from French AIP. French AIP at EUROCONTROL; Statistics

Nice Côte d'Azur Airport (IATA: NCE, ICAO: LFMN) is an international airport located 3.2 NM (5.9 km; 3.7 mi) southwest of Nice, in the Alpes-Maritimes department of France. It is the third busiest airport in France and serves as a focus city for Air France and an operating base for easyJet. In 2025, it handled 15.23 million passengers. The airport is positioned 7 km (4 mi) west of the city centre, and is the principal port of arrival for passengers to the Côte d'Azur.

Due to its proximity to Monaco, which is located 20 km (12 mi) away to the northeast, it also serves as that city-state's airport, with helicopter service linking the principality and airport. Some airlines market Monaco as a destination via Nice Airport.

== History ==
=== Early aviation at the site ===
In the early 1900s the land where the airport now stands was a grassy strip by the sea. The army officer and aviation pioneer Ferdinand Ferber tested his gliders there for several years. Nice held its first aviation meeting on the site in April 1910, and around 100,000 people came to watch. In the 1920s local people called the ground the champ d'aviation de la Californie (Californie airfield). Some airlines, among them the Compagnie Aérienne Française, flew to Nice, but not on a regular basis, and an airport was discussed through the 1930s without being built. Before the Second World War, flights between Paris and the Côte d'Azur landed at Cannes.

=== Post-war development ===
In 1944, American forces built the first concrete runway and the first control tower at the airfield. Air France flew its first Paris–Nice service in June 1945, and the runway was then lengthened to 1,700 m (5,600 ft). The first flight used a Junkers Ju 52 with 18 passengers on board and took more than five hours. By April 1946 there were two flights a day, and the route carried 34,000 passengers in its first year.

Until 1955 the airport was known as Nice-le-Var. It was renamed Nice Côte d'Azur that year, and the runway was extended to 2,200 m (7,200 ft) long and 60 m (200 ft) wide. In 1961, about 5 hectares (12 acres) were reclaimed from the sea to the east, taking the runway to 2,685 m (8,809 ft), and the airport received its first Boeing 707 the same year. Passenger numbers passed one million in 1964.

=== Land reclamation and the 1979 collapse ===
A larger expansion started in 1975. About 200 hectares (490 acres) were reclaimed from the sea using millions of cubic metres of rubble from the Crémat hill. This increased the airport's area to about 380 hectares (940 acres) and made room for a second runway to the south.

On 16 October 1979, part of the new fill at the edge of the airport, where a new harbour was being built, slid into the sea during landfilling work. The slide, of about 10 million cubic metres, was followed by a small tsunami along the coast. Several people were killed in the collapse.

=== Management and ownership ===
The Nice Côte d'Azur Chamber of Commerce and Industry (CCI) ran the airport under a state concession granted in 1956. In July 2008 the concession was transferred to Aéroports de la Côte d'Azur (ACA), a company set up for this purpose in December 2006, and in the same year it was extended to 31 December 2044. The concession also covers Cannes – Mandelieu Airport.

In July 2016 the French government agreed to sell its 60% stake in ACA for about €1.2 billion to Azzurra Aeroporti, a consortium of the Italian group Atlantia, Aeroporti di Roma and EDF Invest. The sale was completed in November 2016, leaving the consortium with 64% of ACA. In 2017 the Principality of Monaco agreed to buy 12.5% of Azzurra Aeroporti. Atlantia changed its name to Mundys in March 2023.

=== Terminal developments ===
Terminal 2 opened in 1987. Terminal 1 was remodelled between 1990 and 1992, and a new Terminal 2 building was opened in 2002. Work on a further renovation of Terminal 1 began in late 2014, and the refurbished terminal was inaugurated on 10 June 2016.

During the COVID-19 pandemic, all flights were moved to Terminal 2 from 16 March 2020 and Terminal 1 was closed. It reopened on 27 March 2022.

Environmental groups challenged a plan to extend Terminal 2 in court, arguing that its impact study looked at the new buildings but not at the likely growth in air traffic. The administrative court of Marseille rejected the challenge on 3 October 2022. On appeal, the Marseille administrative court of appeal found in December 2023 that the impact study did not properly deal with the expected rise in traffic, but allowed the defect to be corrected. After a further study, a new public inquiry and an amended building permit, it dismissed the appeal on 18 September 2025. The extension was inaugurated on 13 April 2026 by the transport minister, Philippe Tabarot, and Prince Albert II of Monaco. It raised the airport's theoretical capacity from 14 million to 18 million passengers a year. At that time the case was still before the Conseil d'État.

== Facilities ==
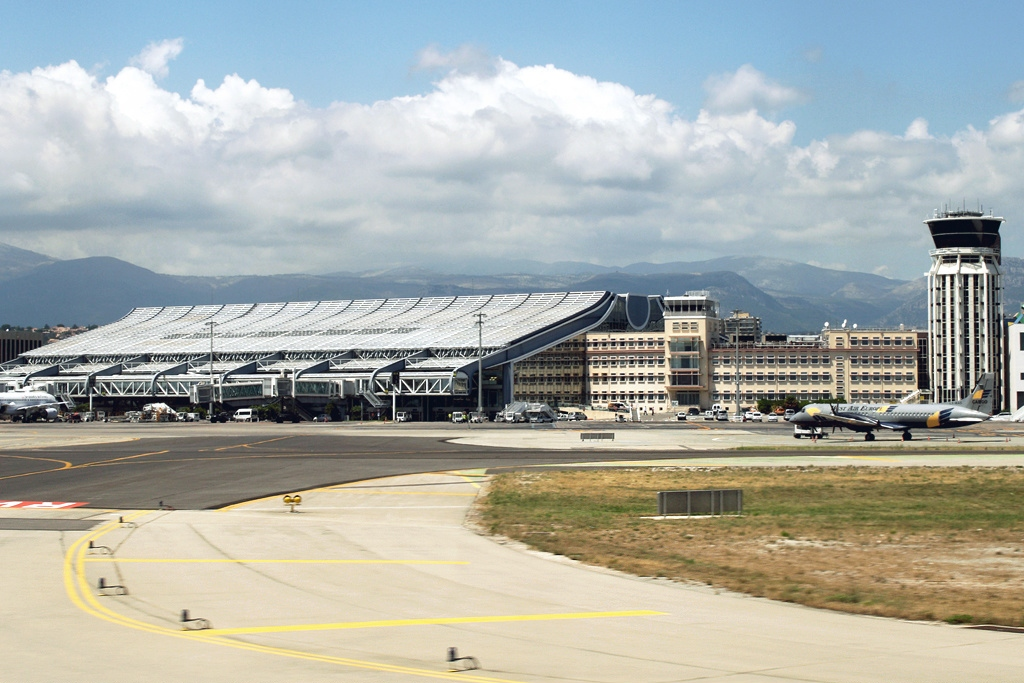
Terminal 1

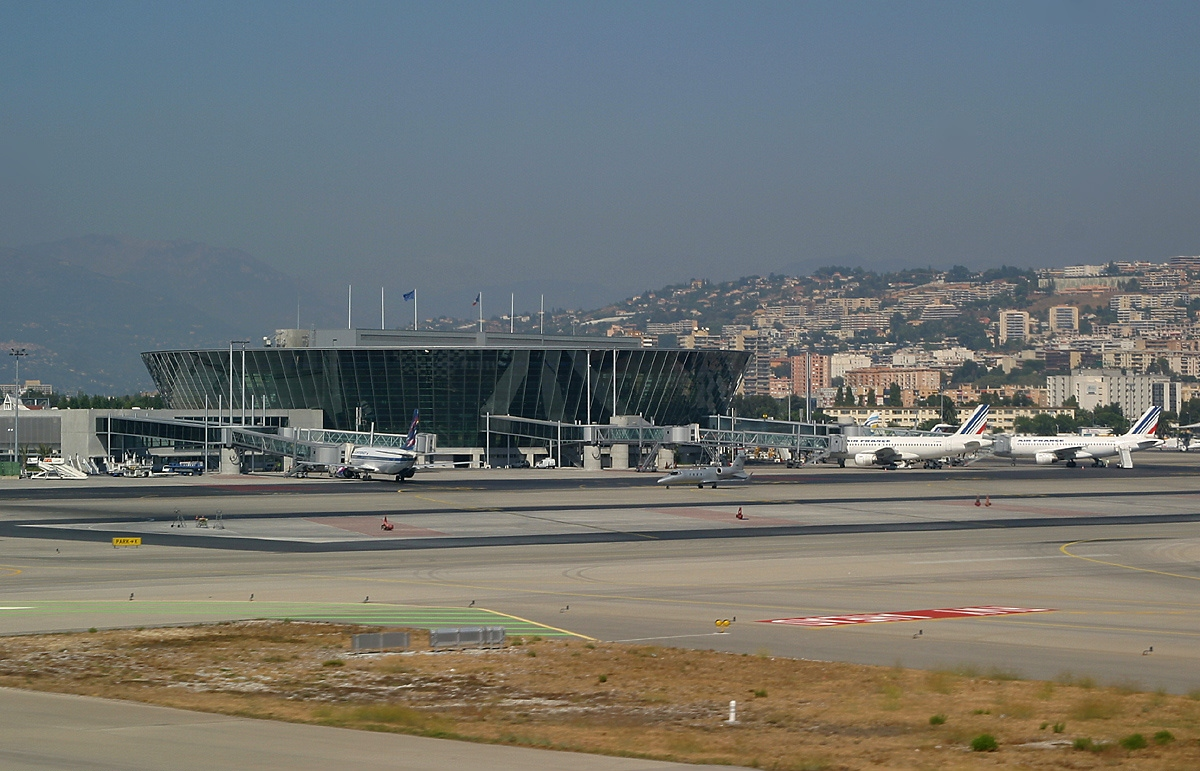
Terminal 2

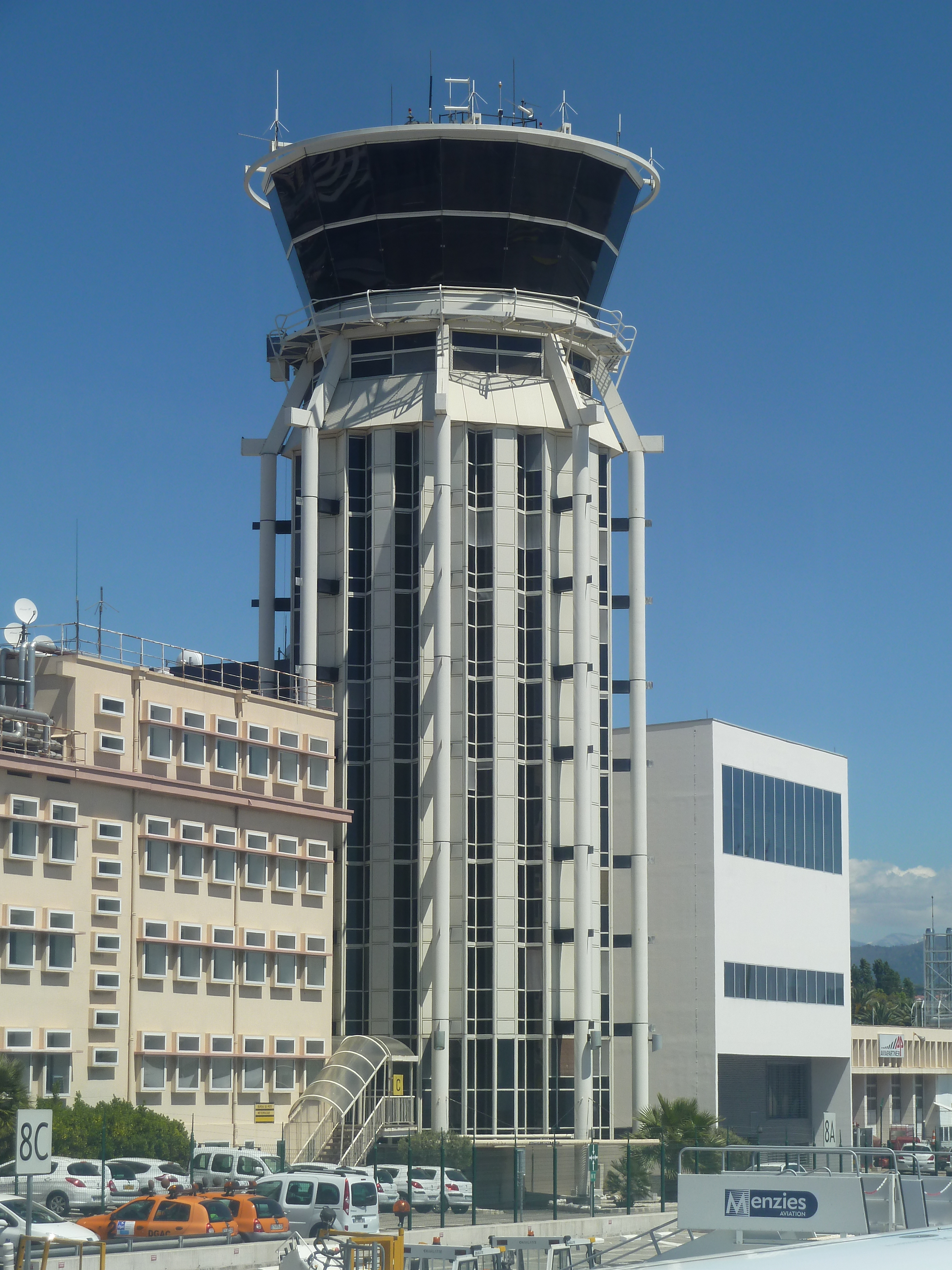
Control tower

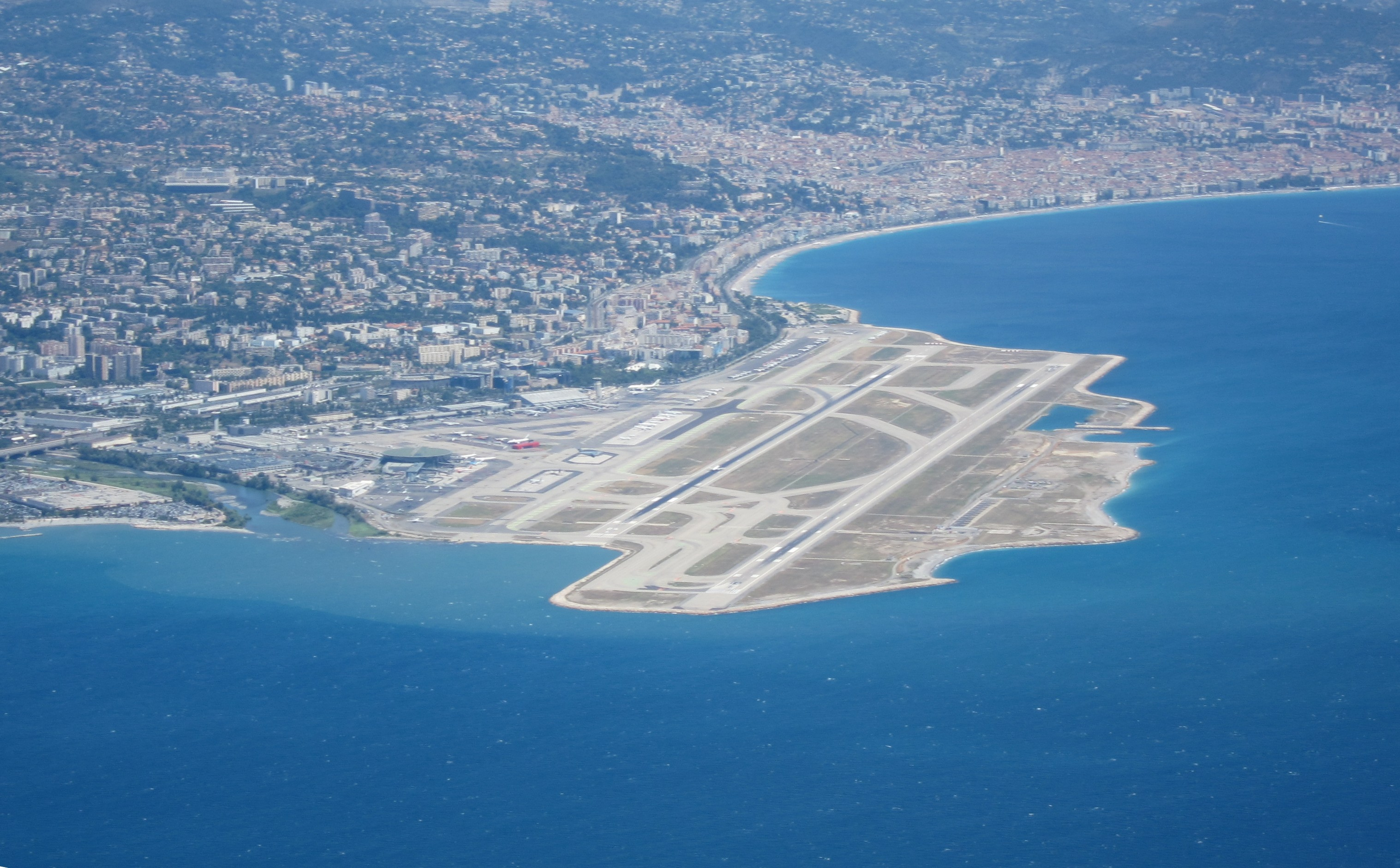
The airport with Nice seen in the background

The airport has two passenger terminals, Terminal 1 and Terminal 2. Nice tramway lines 2 and B stop at both terminals, and the tram ride between them is free.

=== Runways ===
The airport has two parallel runways, both surfaced with asphalt concrete. Runway 04L/22R is 2,570 m (8,430 ft) long and runway 04R/22L is 2,960 m (9,710 ft) long. Part of the airfield, including the southern runway, is built on land reclaimed from the sea.

=== Terminal 1 ===
Terminal 1 is the older of the two terminals and was already in use when Terminal 2 opened in 1987. A renovation carried out between late 2014 and 2016 enlarged the airside area and its waiting space, and the floor area for restaurants and bars grew to 1,340 square metres (14,400 sq ft).

=== Terminal 2 ===
An extension to Terminal 2 added six boarding lounges, 36 check-in desks, a new border police post, more baggage reclaim space and a lounge for international passengers. Parts of it were in use from spring 2025, and it was inaugurated in April 2026. The work cost more than €130 million.

=== Business Aviation Terminal ===
The Business Aviation Terminal, located next to Terminal 2, covers an area of 1,500 m^{2} (16,000 sq ft). Opened in 2010, this terminal contains the operations rooms, VIP lounges, crew lounges and offices of several business aviation companies.

== Airlines and destinations ==
=== Passenger ===
The following airlines operate regular scheduled and charter flights to and from Nice:

| Airlines | Destinations |
|---|---|
| Aegean Airlines | Athens |
| Aer Lingus | Dublin; Seasonal: Cork |
| airBaltic | Riga, Tallinn; Seasonal: Vilnius |
| Air Algérie | Algiers, Constantine |
| Air Canada | Seasonal: Montréal–Trudeau, Toronto–Pearson (begins 16 June 2027) |
| Air Corsica | Ajaccio, Bastia, Calvi, Figari, Florence |
| Air France | Lyon, Paris–Charles de Gaulle |
| Air Serbia | Belgrade |
| Air Transat | Seasonal: Montréal–Trudeau |
| American Airlines | Seasonal: New York–JFK (begins 7 May 2027), Philadelphia |
| Animawings | Seasonal: Bucharest–Otopeni |
| Austrian Airlines | Vienna |
| British Airways | London–Heathrow; Seasonal: Glasgow (begins 16 May 2027), London–City, London–Gatwick, London–Stansted |
| Brussels Airlines | Brussels |
| Chalair Aviation | Seasonal: Brive |
| Delta Air Lines | Seasonal: Atlanta, Boston, New York–JFK |
| easyJet | Agadir, Amsterdam, Athens, Basel/Mulhouse, Berlin, Bordeaux, Bristol, Brussels, Edinburgh, Geneva, Lille, Lisbon, London–Gatwick, London–Luton, Lyon (begins 26 October 2026), Madrid, Manchester, Marrakesh, Nantes, Naples, Paris–Charles de Gaulle, Paris–Orly, Porto, Prague, Rabat, Rennes, Rome–Fiumicino, Strasbourg, Tenerife–South, Toulouse, Venice; Seasonal: Alicante, Bari, Belfast–International, Biarritz, Birmingham, Cagliari, Chania, Funchal, Giza (begins 27 October 2026), Ibiza, Lamezia Terme, Liverpool, Málaga, Malta, Mykonos, Newcastle upon Tyne, Olbia, Palermo, Palma de Mallorca, Rovaniemi, Santorini |
| El Al | Seasonal: Tel Aviv |
| Emirates | Dubai–International |
| Etihad Airways | Seasonal: Abu Dhabi |
| Eurowings | Berlin, Cologne/Bonn, Düsseldorf, Hamburg; Seasonal: Prague, Stuttgart |
| Finnair | Helsinki |
| FlyOne | Chișinău, Yerevan |
| Georgian Airways | Tbilisi |
| Gulf Air | Seasonal: Bahrain, Milan–Malpensa |
| Iberia | Madrid; Seasonal: Ibiza, Málaga, Palma de Mallorca |
| Icelandair | Seasonal: Reykjavík–Keflavík |
| ITA Airways | Rome–Fiumicino |
| Jet2.com | Seasonal: Birmingham, Leeds/Bradford, Manchester |
| KLM | Amsterdam |
| Kuwait Airways | Seasonal: Kuwait City |
| La Compagnie | Newark |
| LOT Polish Airlines | Warsaw–Chopin |
| Lufthansa | Frankfurt, Munich |
| Luxair | Luxembourg |
| Middle East Airlines | Seasonal: Beirut |
| Monacair | Monaco (Note: by helicopter) |
| Norwegian Air Shuttle | Copenhagen, Oslo, Stockholm–Arlanda; Seasonal: Aalborg, Bergen, Billund, Gothenburg, Helsinki, Stavanger, Trondheim |
| Nouvelair | Monastir, Tunis; Seasonal: Djerba |
| Pegasus Airlines | Istanbul–Sabiha Gökçen |
| Qatar Airways | Doha |
| Royal Air Maroc | Casablanca |
| Ryanair | Dublin; Seasonal: London–Stansted |
| Saudia | Seasonal: Riyadh |
| Scandinavian Airlines | Copenhagen, Oslo, Stockholm–Arlanda; Seasonal: Gothenburg, Stavanger |
| SkyUp Airlines | Seasonal: Chișinău |
| SmallFly | Seasonal: Saint-Tropez |
| Smartwings | Prague |
| Swiss International Air Lines | Geneva, Zürich |
| TAP Air Portugal | Lisbon |
| TAROM | Seasonal: Bucharest–Otopeni |
| Transavia | Paris–Orly, Tunis; Seasonal: Dakar–Diass, Eindhoven, Monastir, Tel Aviv (begins 23 December 2026) |
| Tunisair | Djerba, Monastir, Tunis |
| Turkish Airlines | Istanbul |
| Twin Jet | Toulouse; Seasonal: Venice |
| United Airlines | Seasonal: Newark, Washington–Dulles |
| Volotea | Bordeaux, Brest, Caen, Lille, Luxembourg, Nantes, Strasbourg; Seasonal: Charleroi, Venice |
| Vueling | Barcelona; Seasonal: Seville |
| Widerøe | Seasonal: Sandefjord |
| Wizz Air | Belgrade, Bucharest–Otopeni, Budapest, Chișinău, Gdańsk, Kraków, Naples (begins 2 March 2027), Rome–Fiumicino, Sofia, Vilnius, Warsaw–Chopin, Wrocław; Seasonal: Bratislava, Tirana |

=== Cargo ===
| Airlines | Destinations |
|---|---|
| ASL Airlines France | Marseille |

== Statistics ==
Passengers per year
| Year | Passengers | Change | Cargo (tons) | Change |
|---|---|---|---|---|
| 2024 | 14,763,753 | ▲4.0% | 16 035 | ▲46.0% |
| 2023 | 14,189,965 | ▲17.1% | 10 982 | ▲31.9% |
| 2022 | 12,119,043 | ▲85.3% | 8 326 | ▲62.8% |
| 2021 | 6,540,424 | ▲42.8% | 5 114 | ▲108.0% |
| 2020 | 4,580,459 | ▼68.4% | 2 459 | ▼80.7% |
| 2019 | 14,485,423 | ▲4.6% | 12 737 | ▼19.1% |
| 2018 | 13,850,561 | ▲4.1% | 15 748 | ▼1.6% |
| 2017 | 13,304,782 | ▲7.1% | 16 001 | ▲6.3% |
| 2016 | 12,427,511 | ▲3.4% | 15 050 | ▼2.3% |
| 2015 | 12,016,730 | ▲3.1% | 15 403 | ▼7.7% |
| 2014 | 11,660,208 | ▲0.9% | 16 695 | ▼6.2% |
| 2013 | 11,554,251 | ▲3.3% | | |
| 2012 | 11,189,896 | ▲7.4% | | |
| 2011 | 10,422,073 | ▲8.5% | | |
| 2010 | 9,603,014 | ▼2.3% | | |
| 2009 | 9,830,987 | ▼5.3% | | |

=== Busiest domestic routes ===
Top 10 busiest domestic routes from/to Nice (2023)
| Rank | Airport | Passengers | Airline(s) |
|---|---|---|---|
| 1 | Paris–Orly | 1,659,498 | Air France, easyJet |
| 2 | Paris–Charles de Gaulle | 1,177,460 | Air France, easyJet |
| 3 | Lille | 336,970 | easyJet, Volotea |
| 4 | Nantes | 307,844 | easyJet, Volotea |
| 5 | Bordeaux | 294,283 | easyJet, Volotea |
| 6 | Bastia, Corsica | 134,422 | Air Corsica |
| 7 | Toulouse | 131,944 | easyJet, Twin Jet |
| 8 | Ajaccio, Corsica | 126,302 | Air Corsica |
| 9 | Lyon | 114,572 | Air France |
| 10 | Strasbourg | 112,465 | easyJet, Volotea |

=== Busiest international routes ===
Top 20 busiest international routes from/to Nice (2023)
| Rank (2023) | Change from 2022 | Airport | Passengers | Airline(s) |
|---|---|---|---|---|
| 1 | Steady | London–Heathrow | 628,087 | Air France, British Airways |
| 2 | Steady | London–Gatwick | 580,221 | Air France, British Airways, easyJet |
| 3 | ▲1 | Geneva | 421,724 | easyJet, Swiss International Air Lines |
| 4 | ▲1 | Amsterdam | 410,738 | easyJet, KLM, Transavia |
| 5 | ▲1 | Rome–Fiumicino | 388,459 | easyJet, ITA Airways, Wizz Air |
| 6 | ▼3 | Barcelona | 291,247 | easyJet, Vueling |
| 7 | ▲1 | Copenhagen | 289,988 | Norwegian Air Shuttle, Scandinavian Airlines |
| 8 | ▼1 | Frankfurt | 280,787 | Lufthansa |
| 9 | Steady | Brussels | 275,713 | Brussels Airlines, easyJet |
| 10 | Steady | Munich | 251,096 | Lufthansa |
| 11 | Steady | Zürich | 242,244 | Swiss International Air Lines |
| 12 | ▲1 | Lisbon | 234,325 | easyJet, TAP Air Portugal |
| 13 | ▼1 | Vienna | 229,140 | Austrian Airlines, Wizz Air |
| 14 | ▲1 | Dubai–International | 228,132 | Emirates |
| 15 | ▲1 | Stockholm–Arlanda | 207,504 | Eurowings, Norwegian Air Shuttle, Scandinavian Airlines |
| 16 | ▼2 | Madrid | 204,471 | easyJet, Iberia |
| 17 | Steady | Basel/Mulhouse | 194,910 | easyJet |
| 18 | Steady | Oslo | 188,449 | Norwegian Air Shuttle, Scandinavian Airlines |
| 19 | Steady | Istanbul | 188,408 | Turkish Airlines |
| 20 | Steady | Tunis | 183,429 | Nouvelair, Transavia, Tunisair |

== Ground transportation ==
The airport is at the western end of the Promenade des Anglais. Since December 2018, Nice tramway line 2 connects the airport to the Port of Nice (Lympia Port) via the Grand Arénas interchange. Also located at this interchange, some 400 meters from the airport, is the train station Nice Saint Augustin. Trams run every 8 minutes during the day; a separate tramline runs from the airport to the western suburbs. Additionally, bus route 12 connects the airport with Promenade des Artes via the old town.

== Société Naviplane Ferry ==
In 1969 an experimental and short-lived ferry service utilized two N.300 Naviplane hovercraft. The airport was connected to Cannes, Saint-Tropez, Monaco and San-Remo.

== Accidents and incidents ==
- On 9 April 1949, SNCASE Languedoc P/7 F-BATU of Air France overran the runway and was damaged beyond economic repair.
- On 3 March 1952, SNCASE Languedoc P/7 F-BCUM of Air France crashed shortly after take-off; all 38 people on board died. The cause of the accident was that the aileron controls had jammed. The aircraft was operating a domestic scheduled passenger flight from Nice to Orly Airport, Paris.
- On 11 September 1968, Air France Flight 1611 en route from Ajaccio, in the island of Corsica, to Nice, France crashed into the Mediterranean Sea off Nice; all 95 on board died. A memorial is located near the airport.
- On 3 September 1979, Sterling Airways Flight 4133 an Aérospatiale Corvette (Registration: OY-SBS) crashed into the sea 1 km (0.62 mi) south of the airport on a flight from Coventry Airport to Nice. All 10 passengers and crew died in the crash.

== See also ==
- List of the busiest airports in France
