= Saint-Laurent-du-Var station =

Railway station in Saint-Laurent-du-Var, France

Sᵗ-Laurent-du-Var
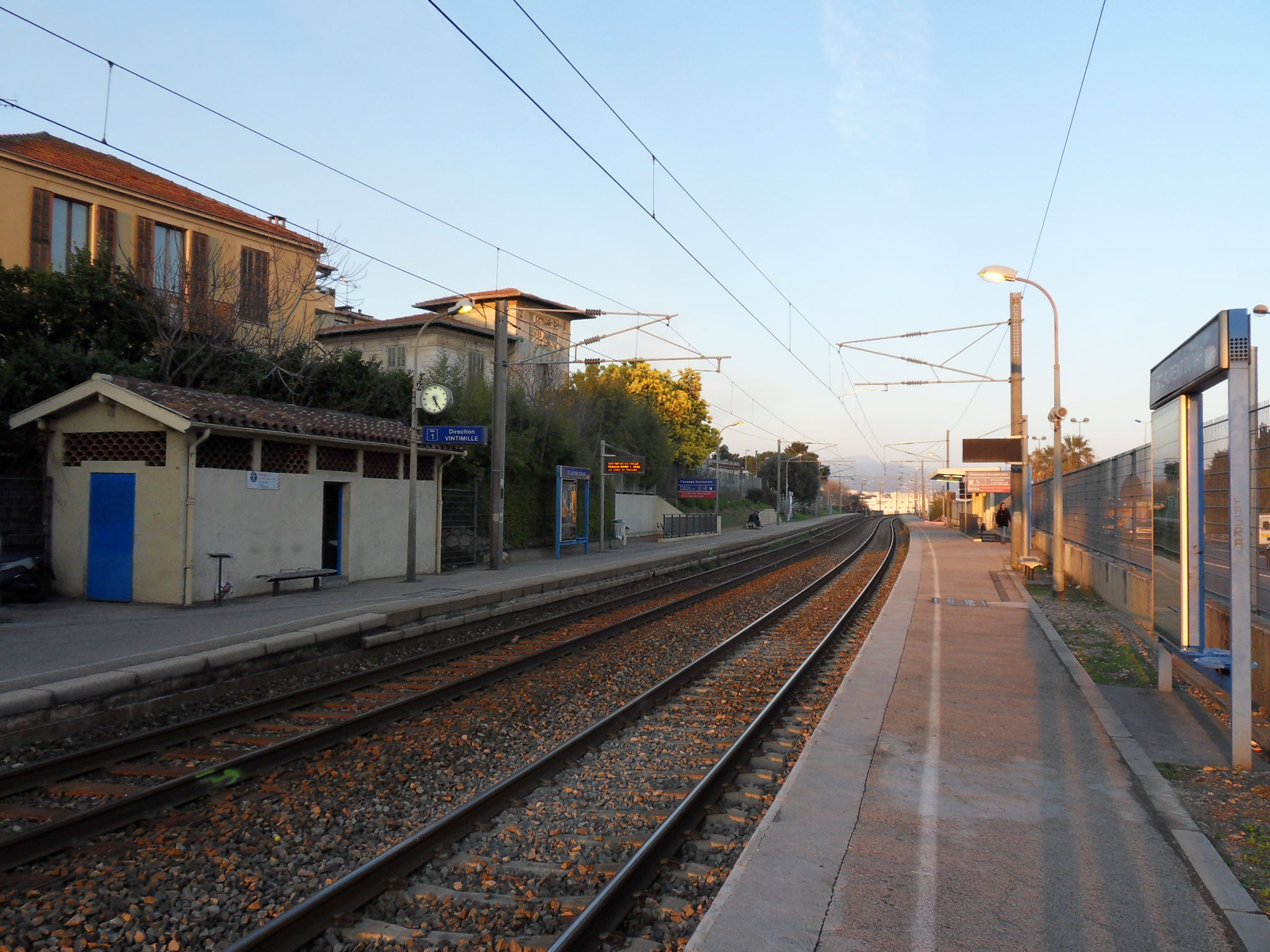

General information
- Location: Nice, France
- Coordinates: 43°39′45″N 7°11′40″E
- Line: Marseille–Ventimiglia railway
- Platforms: 2

Other information
- Station code: 87756346

Key dates
- 1864: Opened

Passengers
- 2024: 1,068,051

Services
Preceding station	TER PACA	Following station
Cagnes-sur-Mer towards Les Arcs–Draguignan	3	Nice-Saint-Augustin towards Nice
Cros-de Cagnes towards Mandelieu-la-Napoule or Grasse	4	Nice-Saint-Augustin towards Ventimiglia
Location

Saint-Laurent-du-Var is a train station on the line from Marseille to Ventimiglia, situated in Saint-Laurent-du-Var, west of Nice, in the department of Alpes-Maritimes in the region of Provence-Alpes-Côte d'Azur, France.

The station is located in the vicinity of the CAP 3000, the largest shopping centre in Nice. Numerous bus serves link the station to the Shopping Centre.

== Services ==
The station is only served by TER with services eastbound towards Nice, Menton and Ventimiglia and westbound services towards Cannes, Grasse and Draguignan. The station is served by regional trains (TER Provence-Alpes-Côte d'Azur) to Cannes, Grasse, Antibes and Nice.
