= Nice tramway =

Tramway system serving Nice

Coordinates: 43°41′49.36″N 7°16′13.35″E

Nice tram
- Tramway de Nice

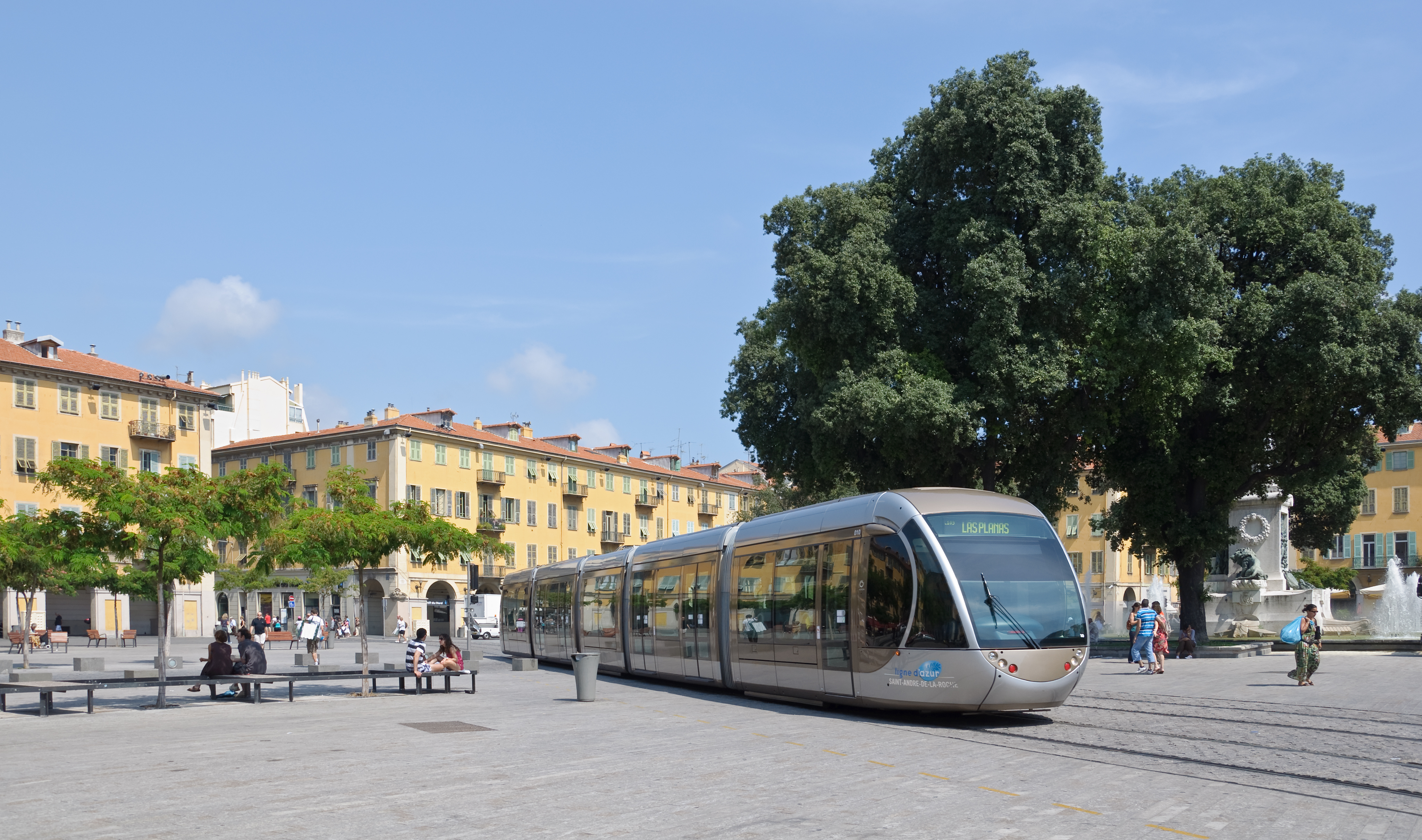
- Tram crossing Place Garibaldi, where it lowers its pantograph and is powered by batteries

Operation
- Locale: Nice, Provence-Alpes-Côte d'Azur, France
- Lines: 4 (+2 in project)
- Operator: Transdev

Infrastructure
- Type: Light rail tram
- Track gauge: 1,435 mm (4 ft 8 1/2 in) standard gauge
- Electrification: 750 V DC Overhead line

Statistics
- Stops: 46
- 2022: 300,000
Overview

The Nice tram (French: Tramway de Nice) is a 27.5-kilometre (17.1 mi), four-line tram system in the city of Nice in Provence-Alpes-Côte d'Azur, France. It is operated by the Société nouvelle des transports de l'agglomération niçoise, a division of Transdev, under the name Lignes d'azur.

Opened on 24 November 2007, it replaced bus lines 1, 2, 5 and 18. From the start, the system had 20 Alstom Citadis trams in service, providing a tram every seven minutes. Since its inception, the number of passengers has increased from 70,000 per day in 2008 to 90,000 per day in 2011. The frequency has gradually increased to a tram every four minutes in 2011.

Given the success of the T1 Line, Mayor Christian Estrosi decided to create additional lines. The West-East T2 Line serves the Nice Côte d'Azur Airport to the west through the construction of a multimodal centre and the Port of Nice to the east. This line runs through a tunnel in the centre of Nice. A future extension of the west–east line, north along the Var valley, is proposed. Another extension, running further west from the airport, across Var, is also proposed. In addition, the Nice Côte d'Azur urban region decided to extend Line 1 to the Pasteur neighbourhood.

== History ==
=== 1900–1953 ===
The first tram in Nice opened in 1879, was electrified in 1900, and was followed by a departmental network in 1906. The entire network was electrified in 1910. In the 1920s, the network had 11 lines, some of which were partially used for goods transport. However, the tram was criticised and was replaced by buses on some lines beginning in 1927. The last tramway in Nice ceased service on 10 January 1953.

=== Renaissance ===
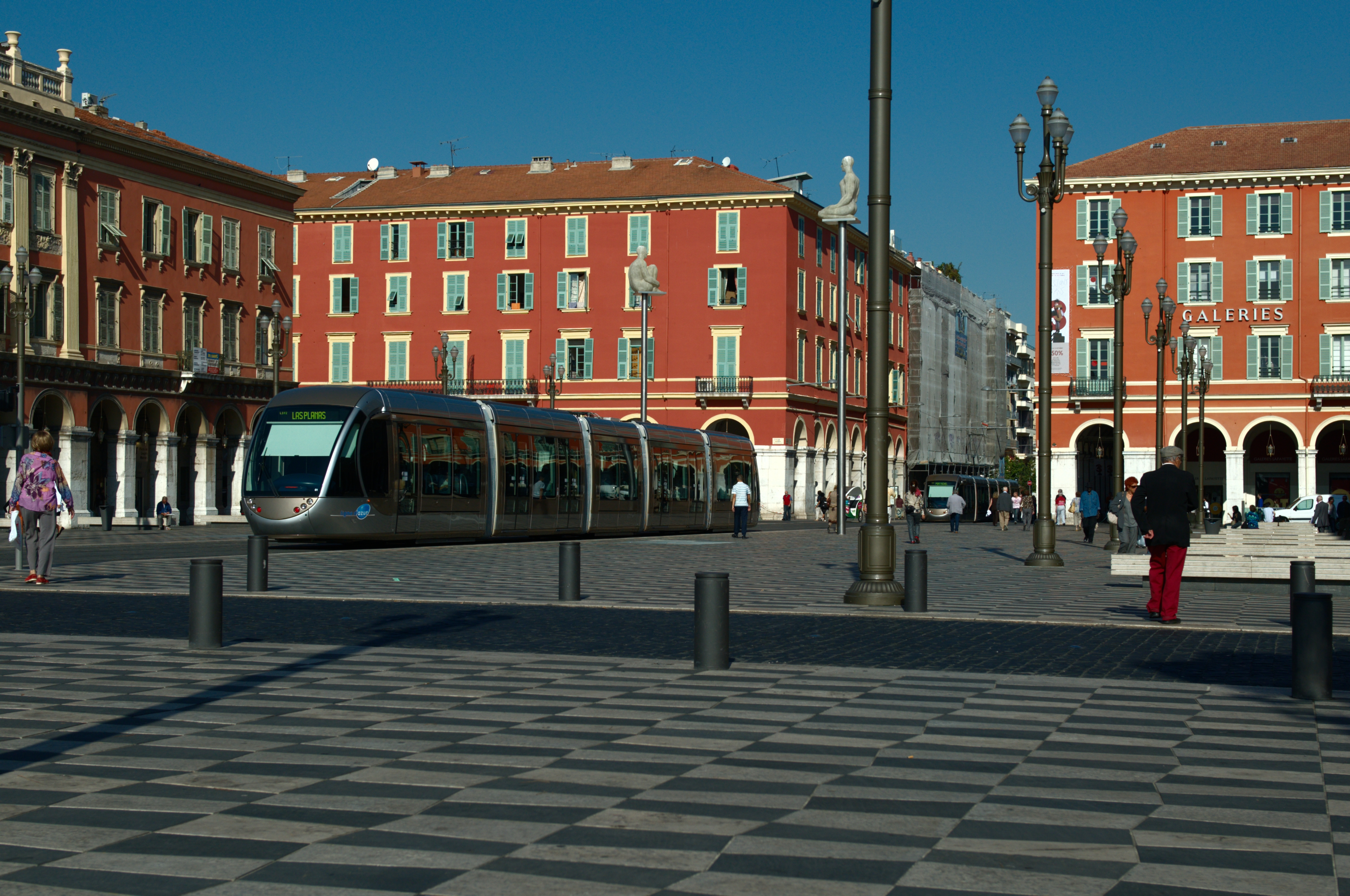
A Nice tramway car at Place Massena

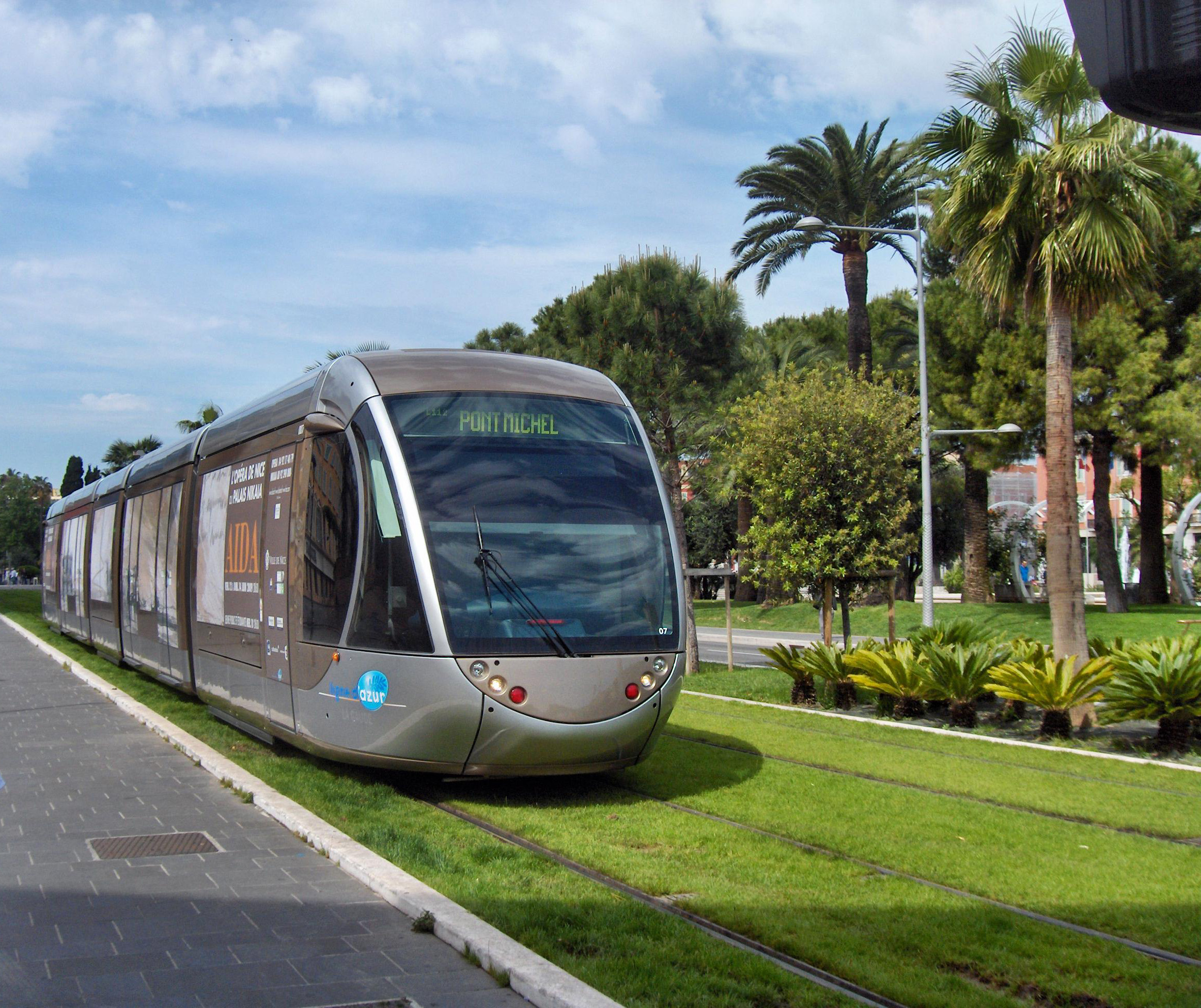
Part of the Nice tramway track is lined by grass.

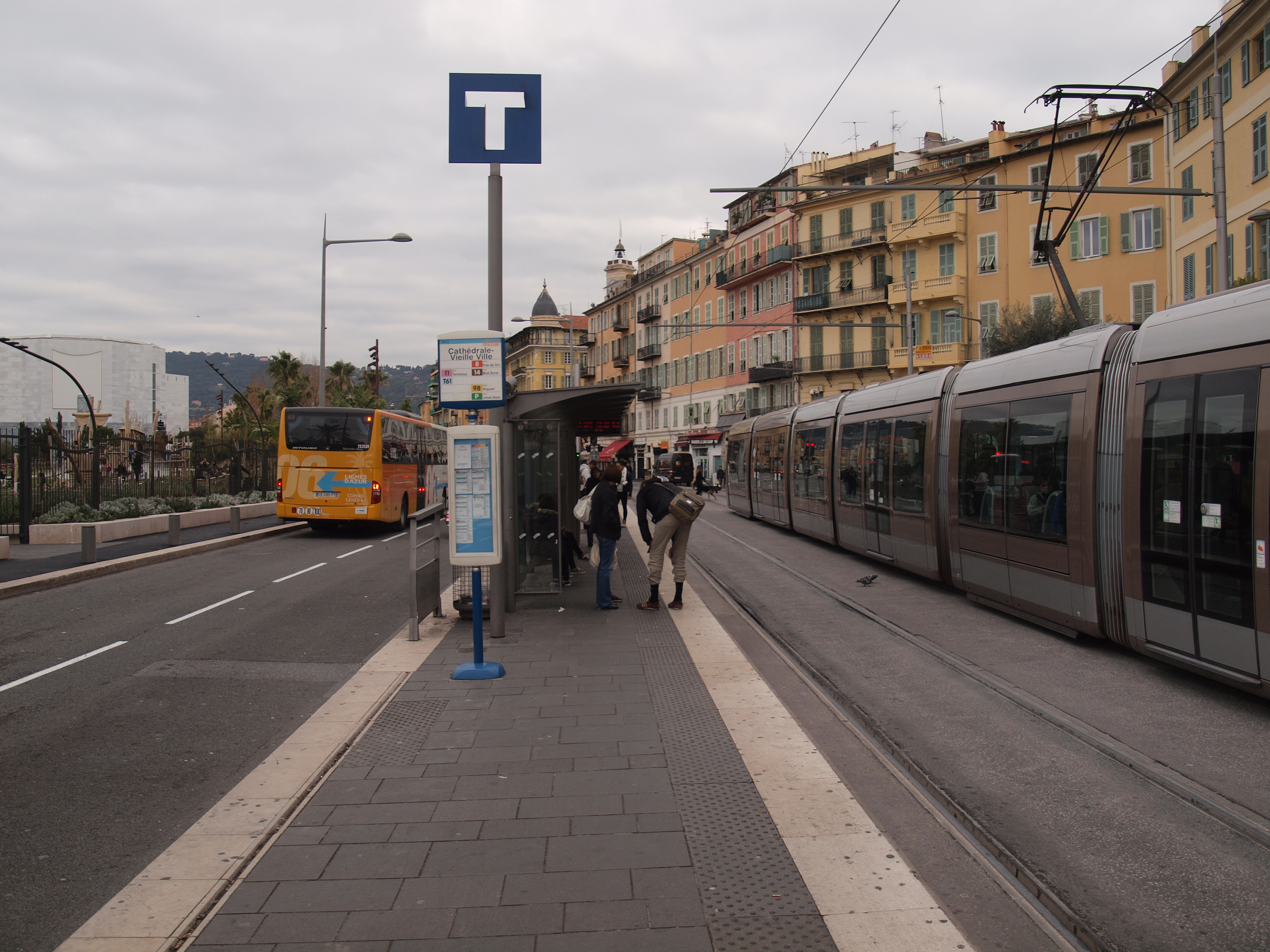
Tram stop Cathédrale-Vieille Ville in the centre of Nice

Like many other French cities, Nice has major traffic problems, including the fact that most economic activities are concentrated in the centre. To overcome these problems, studies on the implementation of transit in dedicated lanes were conducted in 1987. The city of Nice began to implement dedicated bus lanes in 1997, and launched a study on the implementation of a tram line in 1998.

Trams were chosen because they appeared to be more reliable than buses, since they are not subject to the vagaries of traffic, but they are less expensive than a subway line. The tram was declared a public utility in 2003 and work began the same year; the line was placed in service on 24 November 2007 after several weeks of technical trials, even though construction was not fully completed.

In the months following the launch of the tram, there were between 65,000 and 70,000 passengers daily; the number rose to 90,000 by January 2011.

== Network ==
The Nice tramway was designed to serve most of the population of Nice. As the city is situated on hilly ground by the sea, the first tram line was drawn as a U shape, passing through the city centre.

Line	Opened	Length	Stations
T1	2008	9.15 km (5.7 mi)	22
T2	2018 (+2019)	11.3 km (7.0 mi)	20
T3	2019	7.0 km (4.3 mi)	11
Total		27.5 km (17.1 mi)	53

=== Henri Sappia terminus ===
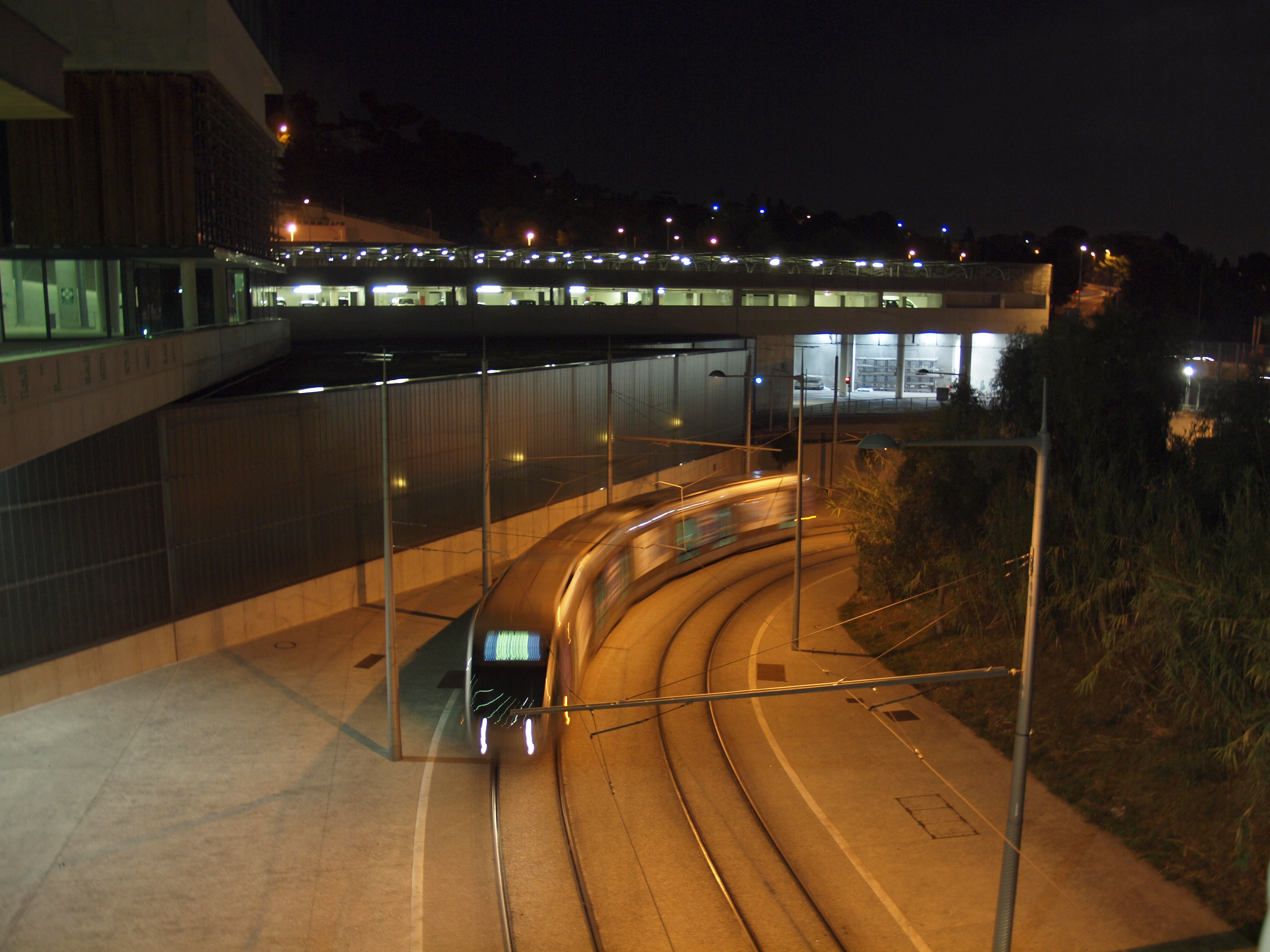
A Nice tramway car pulling into the depot.

Formerly called "Las Planas", the north-western terminus of the tramway was renamed "Henri Sappia" in July, 2013. The Henri Sappia depot is situated at the northwestern terminus of the line in the neighbourhood of Le Rouret, where the Count of Falicon and the Marquis of Rouret once owned large villas and many farms dotted the land.

Above the tram terminus sport and cultural centres have been built. The plaza in front of the station has been raised and planted, with a fountain of water jets installed.

=== Fontaine du Temple ===
The Fontaine du Temple neighbourhood where the Comte de Falicon tram stop is built has been remodelled for the arrival of the tramway. The plaza has been repaved and will host an outdoor market.

== Latest expansions ==
=== Line 2 Ouest-Est (T2) ===
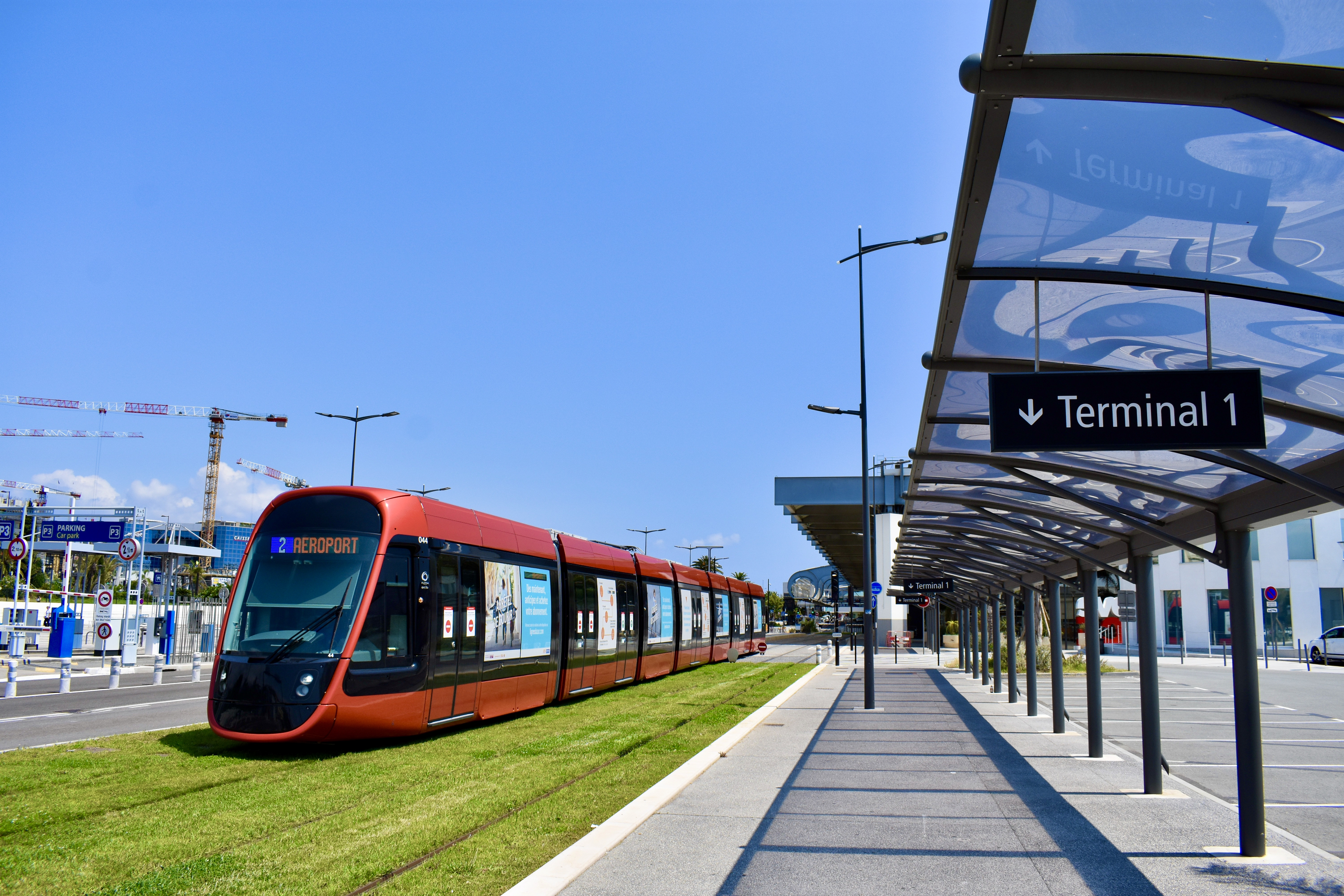
Citadis 405 at the Airport

Line 2 runs for 11.3 km (7.0 mi) of which 3.2 km (2.0 mi) near the centre is underground. Starting at Port Lympia in the east and ending at Nice Côte d'Azur Airport and Nikaïa in the west, serving 20 stations in total. Ridership expectations are 140,000 passengers per day. Work began in the second half of 2014. A €270m contract for building the underground section was awarded in December 2013. Service from CADAM to Magnan opened on June 30, 2018, service to the airport and Jean Médecin station opened as scheduled on 28 June 2019, and service on the complete line was opened in December 2019, the journey is about 26 minutes from Nice Airport to Port Lympia. The total cost of the line is projected to be €770m of which the central government is contributing €52.8m.

=== Line 3 (T3) ===
Line 3 branches off Line 2 at the Interchange located at Gare de Nice-Saint-Augustin which adds an additional 6 stations onto the network with its terminus being located at Saint-Isidore. Line 3 also serves the Allianz Riviera with journey times from the Stadium to the Port projected at being 36 minutes.

== Proposed expansions ==
=== Line 4 (T4) ===
An extension from the current Line 2 (T2) to Saint Laurent du Var and Cagnes-Sur-Mer has been proposed.

=== Line 1 (T1) from Hôpital Pasteur to L'Ariane ===
In addition, an extension of the original Line 1 (T1) from its current terminus at Hôpital Pasteur to the northern neighbourhood of L'Ariane is being considered.

== Tram and art ==
Art works are used throughout the line, including sculptures of figures by Jaume Plensa, on the top of pylons on the Place Massena. Michel Redolfi designed the sound system. Artists Benjamin Vautier, known as "Ben" (who designed the station name signs), the Mado la Niçoise, Michael Lonsdale and others make voice announcements inside the tram. Sounds and voices are different depending on the hours, seasons, etc. The thirteen artists selected to decorate the tramway are:

- Ben (Benjamin Vautier)
- Michael Craig-Martin
- Gunda Förster
- Yann Kersalé
- Ange Leccia
- Stéphane Magnin
- Maurizio Nannucci
- Jean-Michel Othoniel
- Pascal Pinaud
- Jaume Plensa
- Emmanuel Saulnier
- Pierre di Sciullo
- Sarkis Zabunyan
- Jacques Vieille

== Rolling stock ==
=== Line 1 (T1) ===
The cars of the Nice tramway are unique and have been designed to blend in with the Niçois architecture. They are based on the Alstom Citadis family of tramcars and were built near La Rochelle, Poitou-Charentes. A standard 5-car tram measures 35 m (114 ft 10 in) but two extra carriages were added, bringing the length to 45 m (147 ft 7 5/8 in). The tram is 2.65 m (8 ft 8 3/8 in) wide and can carry 200 passengers at an average speed of 18 km/h (11 mph) compared to an average speed of 11 km/h (6.8 mph) for the bus. It uses the 1,435 mm (4 ft 8 1/2 in) standard gauge.

=== Lines 2 and 3 (T2, T3) ===
For T2 and T3 lines new Citadis 405 were built. They consist of seven cars and are equipped with a Ground-level power supply and batteries.

== Power supply ==
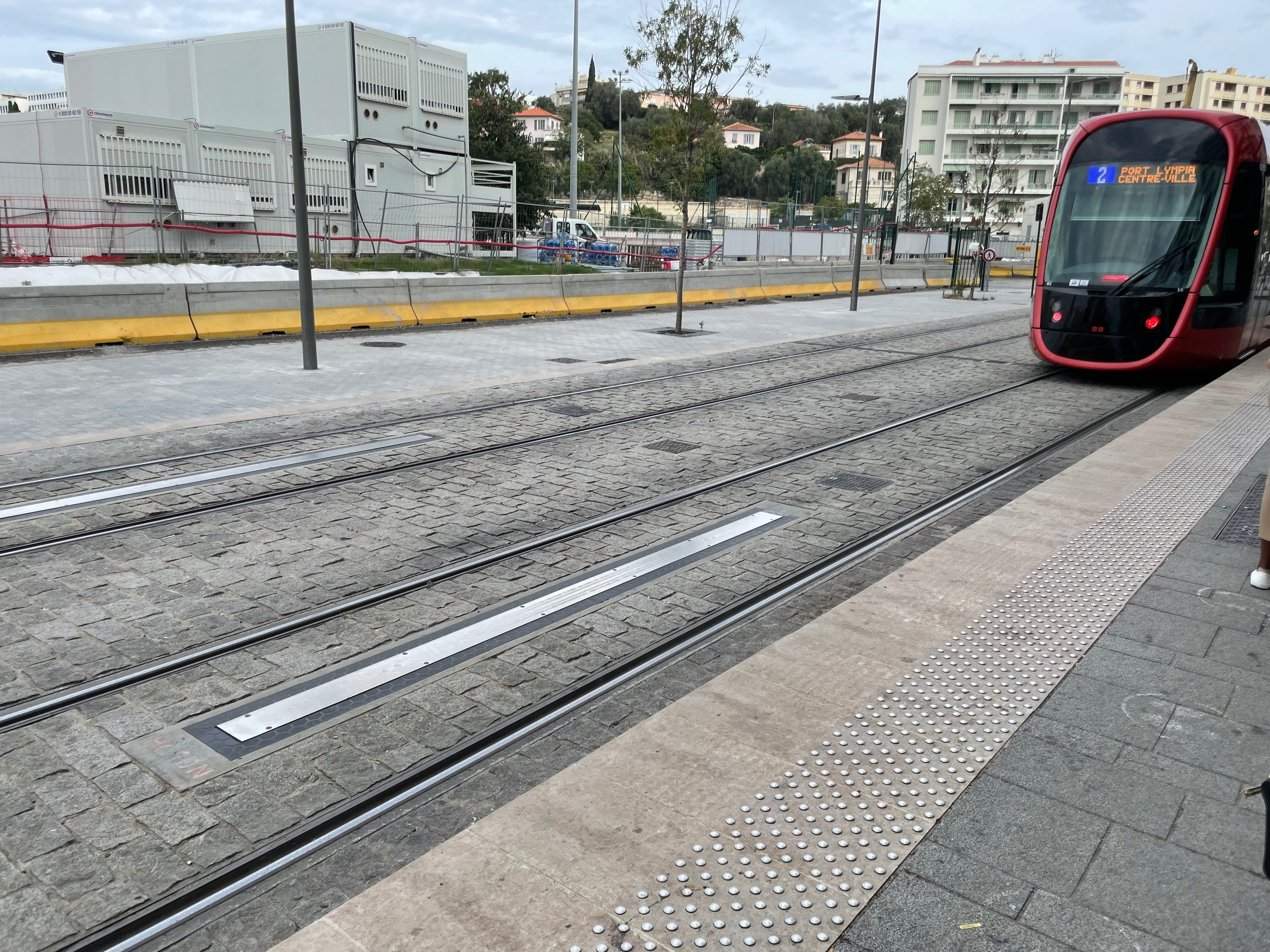
Nice tramway power charging location (metal strip) at station

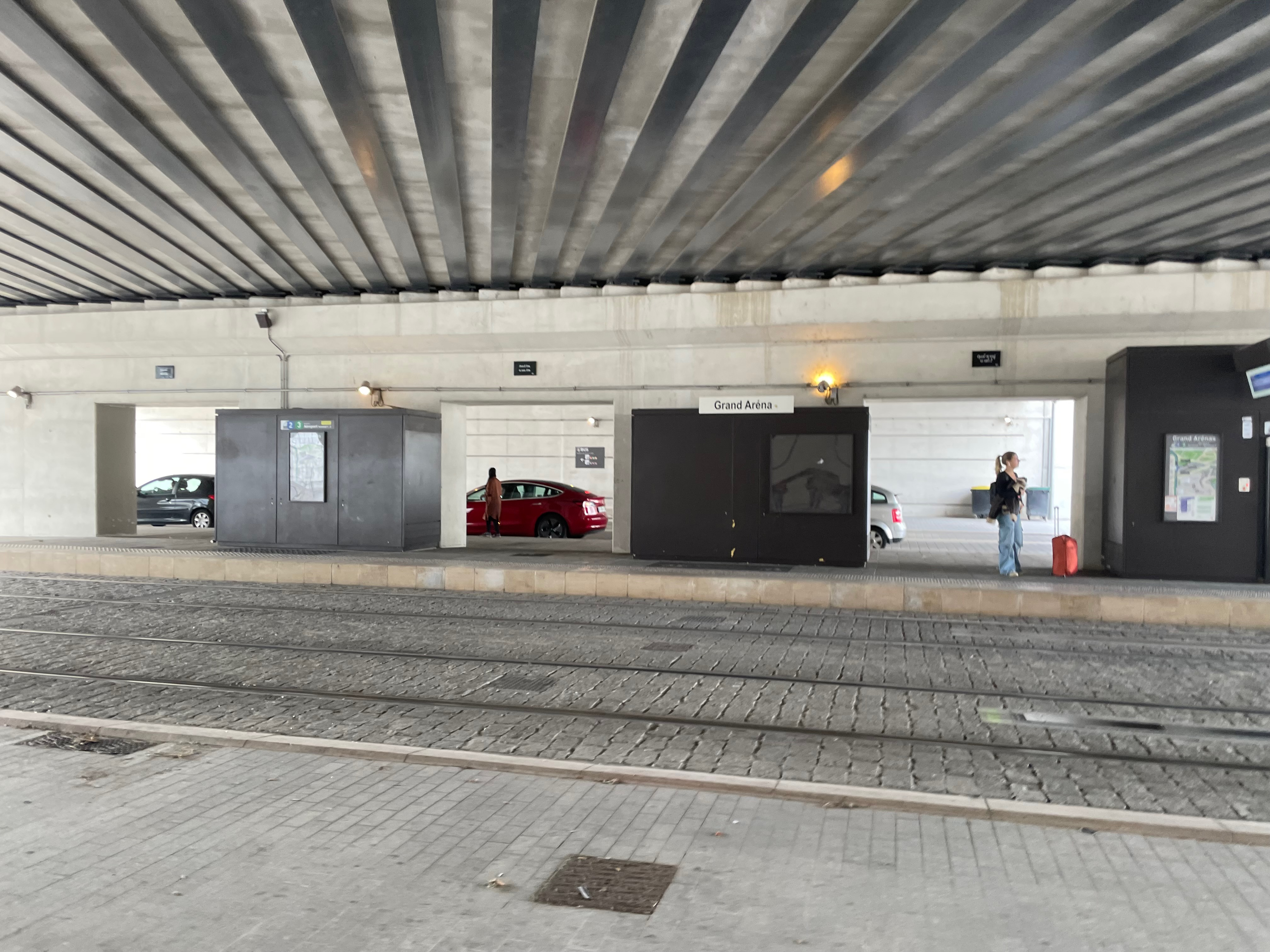
Nice tram battery power charging equipment on station platforms

Nice tramway was originally to use the ground-level power supply third rail system as used by Bordeaux tramway. However, this plan was modified in favor of a hybrid system where the tram is able to operate on both conventional overhead power supply 750 VDC catenary wires using a pantograph (in much of the underground and central city areas of Nice) as well as using on-board nickel metal hydride batteries without pantograph (for most distances of the outer suburbs, and for example where the tram crosses the Place Masséna and Place Garibaldi). Tram stations are equipped with power charging contact strips located beneath the tram stopping position (see photo), with accompanying battery/supercapacitor banks seen on the station platform (built/supplied by Alstom).

== See also ==
- Trams in France
- List of town tramway systems in France
