= Place Masséna =

Historic square in Nice, Alpes-Maritimes, France

Coordinates: 43.6973°N 7.2701°E

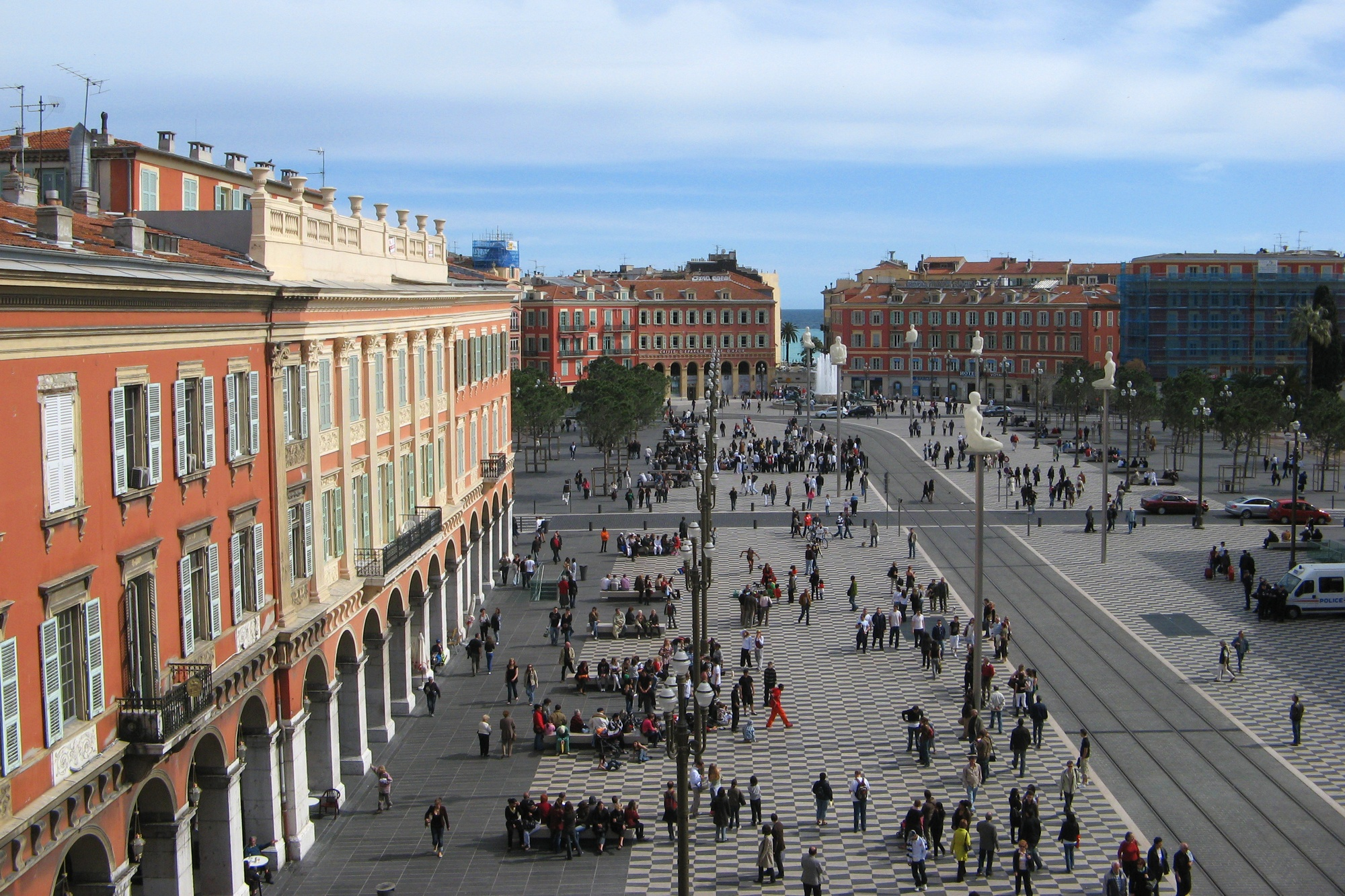
The Place Masséna in 2008.

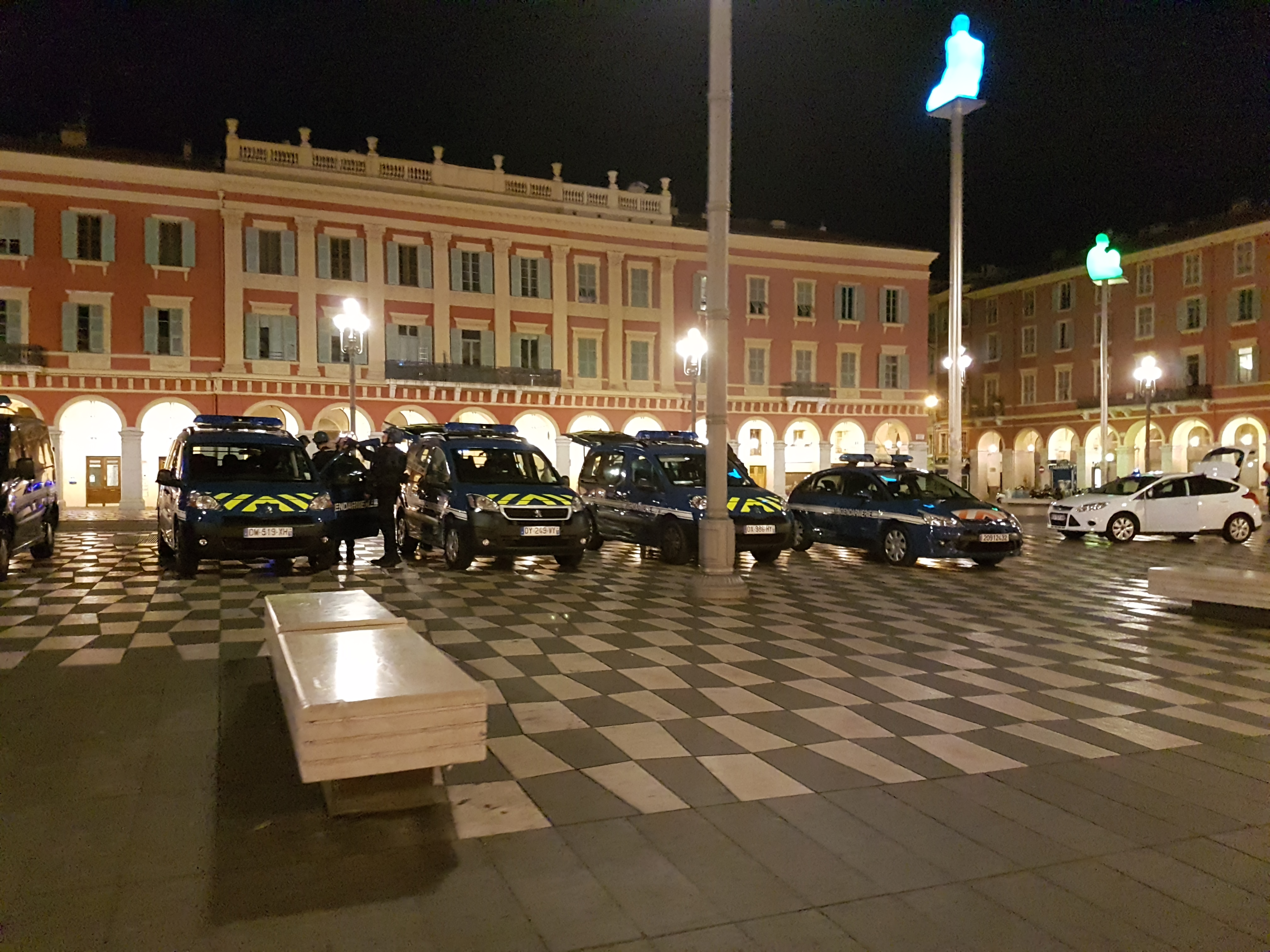
Massive Police presence in Place Masséna just an hour and a half after the Nice Attacks on July 14, 2016

The Place Masséna (French pronunciation: [plas masena]) is a historic square in Nice, Alpes-Maritimes, France. It was named for André Masséna. Its layout was designed by Joseph Vernier in 1843-1844.

The Place Masséna is the main square of the city. Before the Paillon River was covered over, the Pont-Neuf was the only practicable way between the old town and the modern one. The square was thus divided into two parts (North and South) in 1824. With the demolition of the Masséna Casino in 1979, the Place Masséna became more spacious and less dense and is now bordered by red ochre buildings of Italian architecture.

The recent rebuilding of the tramline gave the square back to the pedestrians, restoring its status as a real Mediterranean square. It is lined with palm trees and stone pines, instead of being the rectangular roundabout of sorts it had become over the years. Since its construction, the Place Masséna has always been the spot for great public events. It is used for concerts, and particularly during the summer festivals, the Corso carnavalesque (carnival parade) in February, the military procession of 14 July (Bastille Day) or other traditional celebrations and banquets.

The Place Masséna is a two-minute walk from the Promenade des Anglais, old town, town centre, and Albert I Garden (Jardin Albert Ier). It is also a large crossroads between several of the main streets of the city: avenue Jean Médecin, avenue Félix Faure, boulevard Jean Jaurès, avenue de Verdun and rue Gioffredo.

There are seven statues on high poles along the tram lines. In 2007, Catalan artist Jaume Plensa created the contemporary art installation, comprising statues of kneeling men representing the seven continents known as Conversation in Nice.
