= 2021 Paris–Nice =

Cycling race

2021 UCI World Tour, race 4 of 29

Race details
- Dates: 7–14 March 2021
- Stages: 8
- Distance: 1,173.8 km (729.4 mi)
- Winning time: 28h 49' 51"

Results
Jersey awarded to the overall winner	Winner	Maximilian Schachmann (GER)	(Bora–Hansgrohe)
	Second	Aleksandr Vlasov (RUS)	(Astana–Premier Tech)
	Third	Ion Izagirre (ESP)	(Astana–Premier Tech)
Jersey awarded to the points classification winner	Points	Primož Roglič (SLO)	(Team Jumbo–Visma)
Jersey awarded to the mountains classification winner	Mountains	Anthony Perez (FRA)	(Cofidis)
Jersey awarded to the young rider classification winner	Young rider	Aleksandr Vlasov (RUS)	(Astana–Premier Tech)
	Team	Astana–Premier Tech	

The 2021 Paris–Nice was a road cycling stage race held between 7 and 14 March 2021 in France. It was the 79th edition of Paris–Nice and the fourth race of the 2021 UCI World Tour.

== Teams ==
Twenty-three teams participated in the race, including all nineteen UCI WorldTeams and four UCI ProTeams. Each team entered seven riders, for a total of 161 riders, of which 127 finished the race.

UCI WorldTeams

- AG2R Citroën Team
- Astana–Premier Tech
- Bora–Hansgrohe
- Cofidis
- Deceuninck–Quick-Step
- EF Education–Nippo
- Groupama–FDJ
- INEOS Grenadiers
- Intermarché–Wanty–Gobert Matériaux
- Israel Start-Up Nation
- Lotto–Soudal
- Movistar Team
- Team Bahrain Victorious
- Team BikeExchange
- Team DSM
- Team Jumbo–Visma
- Team Qhubeka Assos
- Trek–Segafredo
- UAE Team Emirates

UCI ProTeams

- Alpecin–Fenix
- Arkéa–Samsic
- B&B Hotels p/b KTM
- Total Direct Énergie

== Route ==
Stage characteristics and winners
Stage	Date	Course	Distance	Type	Winner
1	7 March	Saint-Cyr-l'École to Saint-Cyr-l'École	166 km (103 mi)	Hilly stage	Sam Bennett (IRL)
2	8 March	Oinville-sur-Montcient to Amilly	188 km (117 mi)	Flat stage	Cees Bol (NED)
3	9 March	Gien to Gien	14.4 km (8.9 mi)	Individual time trial	Stefan Bissegger (SUI)
4	10 March	Chalon-sur-Saône to Chiroubles	188 km (117 mi)	Hilly stage	Primož Roglič (SLO)
5	11 March	Vienne to Bollène	203 km (126 mi)	Flat stage	Sam Bennett (IRL)
6	12 March	Brignoles to Biot	202.5 km (125.8 mi)	Hilly stage	Primož Roglič (SLO)
7	13 March	~~Nice~~ Le Broc (Note: Race organisers were forced to reroute the final two stages after facing pressure from local authorities and the mayor of Nice, who wanted to keep the Promenade des Anglais seafront open to the public as they looked to ease a local COVID-19 lockdown. As a result, the starts of stages 7 and 8, as well as the finish of stage 8, were relocated.) to Valdeblore La Colmiane	~~166.5 km (103.5 mi)~~ 119.2 km (74.1 mi)	Mountain stage	Primož Roglič (SLO)
8	14 March	~~Nice~~ Le Plan du Var to ~~Nice~~ Levens	~~110.5 km (68.7 mi)~~ 92.7 km (57.6 mi)	Hilly stage	Magnus Cort (DEN)
Total		~~1,238.9 km (769.8 mi)~~ 1,173.8 km (729.4 mi)			

== Stages ==
=== Stage 1 ===
7 March 2021 — Saint-Cyr-l'École to Saint-Cyr-l'École, 166 km (103 mi)

Stage 1 Result
Rank	Rider	Team	Time
1	Sam Bennett (IRL)	Deceuninck–Quick-Step	3h 51' 38"
2	Arnaud Démare (FRA)	Groupama–FDJ	+ 0"
3	Mads Pedersen (DEN)	Trek–Segafredo	+ 0"
4	Jasper Philipsen (BEL)	Alpecin–Fenix	+ 0"
5	Bryan Coquard (FRA)	B&B Hotels p/b KTM	+ 0"
6	Pascal Ackermann (GER)	Bora–Hansgrohe	+ 0"
7	Phil Bauhaus (GER)	Team Bahrain Victorious	+ 0"
8	Christophe Laporte (FRA)	Cofidis	+ 0"
9	André Greipel (GER)	Israel Start-Up Nation	+ 0"
10	Rudy Barbier (FRA)	Israel Start-Up Nation	+ 0"

General classification after Stage 1
Rank	Rider	Team	Time
1	Sam Bennett (IRL)	Deceuninck–Quick-Step	3h 51' 28"
2	Arnaud Démare (FRA)	Groupama–FDJ	+ 4"
3	Michael Matthews (AUS)	Team BikeExchange	+ 5"
4	Mads Pedersen (DEN)	Trek–Segafredo	+ 6"
5	Tiesj Benoot (BEL)	Team DSM	+ 8"
6	Ben Swift (GBR)	INEOS Grenadiers	+ 9"
7	Jasper Stuyven (BEL)	Trek–Segafredo	+ 9"
8	Jasper Philipsen (BEL)	Alpecin–Fenix	+ 10"
9	Bryan Coquard (FRA)	B&B Hotels p/b KTM	+ 10"
10	Pascal Ackermann (GER)	Bora–Hansgrohe	+ 10"

=== Stage 2 ===
8 March 2021 — Oinville-sur-Montcient to Amilly, 188 km (117 mi)

Stage 2 Result
Rank	Rider	Team	Time
1	Cees Bol (NED)	Team DSM	4h 27' 59"
2	Mads Pedersen (DEN)	Trek–Segafredo	+ 0"
3	Michael Matthews (AUS)	Team BikeExchange	+ 0"
4	Bryan Coquard (FRA)	B&B Hotels p/b KTM	+ 0"
5	Sam Bennett (IRL)	Deceuninck–Quick-Step	+ 0"
6	John Degenkolb (GER)	Lotto–Soudal	+ 0"
7	Pascal Ackermann (GER)	Bora–Hansgrohe	+ 0"
8	Phil Bauhaus (GER)	Team Bahrain Victorious	+ 0"
9	Jasper Philipsen (BEL)	Alpecin–Fenix	+ 0"
10	Rudy Barbier (FRA)	Israel Start-Up Nation	+ 0"

General classification after Stage 2
Rank	Rider	Team	Time
1	Michael Matthews (AUS)	Team BikeExchange	8h 19' 23"
2	Mads Pedersen (DEN)	Trek–Segafredo	+ 4"
3	Sam Bennett (IRL)	Deceuninck–Quick-Step	+ 4"
4	Cees Bol (NED)	Team DSM	+ 4"
5	Arnaud Démare (FRA)	Groupama–FDJ	+ 8"
6	André Greipel (GER)	Israel Start-Up Nation	+ 11"
7	Tiesj Benoot (BEL)	Team DSM	+ 12"
8	Florian Vermeersch (BEL)	Lotto–Soudal	+ 12"
9	Jasper Stuyven (BEL)	Trek–Segafredo	+ 13"
10	Ben Swift (GBR)	INEOS Grenadiers	+ 13"

=== Stage 3 ===
9 March 2021 — Gien to Gien, 14.4 km (8.9 mi) (ITT)

Stage 3 Result
Rank	Rider	Team	Time
1	Stefan Bissegger (SUI)	EF Education–Nippo	17' 34"
2	Rémi Cavagna (FRA)	Deceuninck–Quick-Step	+ 0"
3	Primož Roglič (SLO)	Team Jumbo–Visma	+ 6"
4	Brandon McNulty (USA)	UAE Team Emirates	+ 9"
5	Søren Kragh Andersen (DEN)	Team DSM	+ 10"
6	Rohan Dennis (AUS)	INEOS Grenadiers	+ 13"
7	Christophe Laporte (FRA)	Cofidis	+ 13"
8	Dylan van Baarle (NED)	INEOS Grenadiers	+ 14"
9	Yves Lampaert (BEL)	Deceuninck–Quick-Step	+ 16"
10	Patrick Bevin (NZL)	Israel Start-Up Nation	+ 16"

General classification after Stage 3
Rank	Rider	Team	Time
1	Stefan Bissegger (SUI)	EF Education–Nippo	8h 37' 11"
2	Rémi Cavagna (FRA)	Deceuninck–Quick-Step	+ 0"
3	Primož Roglič (SLO)	Team Jumbo–Visma	+ 6"
4	Brandon McNulty (USA)	UAE Team Emirates	+ 9"
5	Michael Matthews (AUS)	Team BikeExchange	+ 9"
6	Søren Kragh Andersen (DEN)	Team DSM	+ 10"
7	Mads Pedersen (DEN)	Trek–Segafredo	+ 12"
8	Christophe Laporte (FRA)	Cofidis	+ 13"
9	Dylan van Baarle (NED)	INEOS Grenadiers	+ 14"
10	Yves Lampaert (BEL)	Deceuninck–Quick-Step	+ 15"

=== Stage 4 ===
10 March 2021 — Chalon-sur-Saône to Chiroubles, 188 km (117 mi)

Stage 4 Result
Rank	Rider	Team	Time
1	Primož Roglič (SLO)	Team Jumbo–Visma	4h 49' 36"
2	Maximilian Schachmann (GER)	Bora–Hansgrohe	+ 12"
3	Guillaume Martin (FRA)	Cofidis	+ 12"
4	Tiesj Benoot (BEL)	Team DSM	+ 12"
5	Aleksandr Vlasov (RUS)	Astana–Premier Tech	+ 12"
6	Lucas Hamilton (AUS)	Team BikeExchange	+ 12"
7	David Gaudu (FRA)	Groupama–FDJ	+ 16"
8	Quentin Pacher (FRA)	B&B Hotels p/b KTM	+ 16"
9	Pierre Latour (FRA)	Total Direct Énergie	+ 16"
10	Ion Izagirre (ESP)	Astana–Premier Tech	+ 16"

General classification after Stage 4
Rank	Rider	Team	Time
1	Primož Roglič (SLO)	Team Jumbo–Visma	13h 26' 40"
2	Maximilian Schachmann (GER)	Bora–Hansgrohe	+ 35"
3	Brandon McNulty (USA)	UAE Team Emirates	+ 37"
4	Aleksandr Vlasov (RUS)	Astana–Premier Tech	+ 41"
5	Ion Izagirre (ESP)	Astana–Premier Tech	+ 43"
6	Matteo Jorgenson (USA)	Movistar Team	+ 58"
7	Tiesj Benoot (BEL)	Team DSM	+ 1' 05"
8	Lucas Hamilton (AUS)	Team BikeExchange	+ 1' 09"
9	Luis León Sánchez (ESP)	Astana–Premier Tech	+ 1' 11"
10	Pierre Latour (FRA)	Total Direct Énergie	+ 1' 12"

=== Stage 5 ===
11 March 2021 — Vienne to Bollène, 203 km (126 mi)

Stage 5 Result
Rank	Rider	Team	Time
1	Sam Bennett (IRL)	Deceuninck–Quick-Step	5h 16' 01"
2	Nacer Bouhanni (FRA)	Arkéa–Samsic	+ 0"
3	Pascal Ackermann (GER)	Bora–Hansgrohe	+ 0"
4	Phil Bauhaus (GER)	Team Bahrain Victorious	+ 0"
5	Giacomo Nizzolo (ITA)	Team Qhubeka Assos	+ 0"
6	Alexander Kristoff (NOR)	UAE Team Emirates	+ 0"
7	Bryan Coquard (FRA)	B&B Hotels p/b KTM	+ 0"
8	Christophe Laporte (FRA)	Cofidis	+ 0"
9	Rudy Barbier (FRA)	Israel Start-Up Nation	+ 0"
10	Danny van Poppel (NED)	Intermarché–Wanty–Gobert Matériaux	+ 0"

General classification after Stage 5
Rank	Rider	Team	Time
1	Primož Roglič (SLO)	Team Jumbo–Visma	18h 42' 46"
2	Maximilian Schachmann (GER)	Bora–Hansgrohe	+ 31"
3	Brandon McNulty (USA)	UAE Team Emirates	+ 37"
4	Ion Izagirre (ESP)	Astana–Premier Tech	+ 40"
5	Aleksandr Vlasov (RUS)	Astana–Premier Tech	+ 41"
6	Matteo Jorgenson (USA)	Movistar Team	+ 56"
7	Tiesj Benoot (BEL)	Team DSM	+ 1' 04"
8	Lucas Hamilton (AUS)	Team BikeExchange	+ 1' 08"
9	Luis León Sánchez (ESP)	Astana–Premier Tech	+ 1' 11"
10	Pierre Latour (FRA)	Total Direct Énergie	+ 1' 12"

=== Stage 6 ===
12 March 2021 — Brignoles to Biot, 202.5 km (125.8 mi)

Stage 6 Result
Rank	Rider	Team	Time
1	Primož Roglič (SLO)	Team Jumbo–Visma	4h 40' 22"
2	Christophe Laporte (FRA)	Cofidis	+ 0"
3	Michael Matthews (AUS)	Team BikeExchange	+ 0"
4	Dylan Teuns (BEL)	Team Bahrain Victorious	+ 0"
5	Aurélien Paret-Peintre (FRA)	AG2R Citroën Team	+ 0"
6	Lucas Hamilton (AUS)	Team BikeExchange	+ 0"
7	Bryan Coquard (FRA)	B&B Hotels p/b KTM	+ 0"
8	Quentin Pacher (FRA)	B&B Hotels p/b KTM	+ 0"
9	Sergio Henao (COL)	Team Qhubeka Assos	+ 0"
10	Krists Neilands (LAT)	Israel Start-Up Nation	+ 0"

General classification after Stage 6
Rank	Rider	Team	Time
1	Primož Roglič (SLO)	Team Jumbo–Visma	23h 22' 53"
2	Maximilian Schachmann (GER)	Bora–Hansgrohe	+ 41"
3	Ion Izagirre (ESP)	Astana–Premier Tech	+ 50"
4	Aleksandr Vlasov (RUS)	Astana–Premier Tech	+ 51"
5	Matteo Jorgenson (USA)	Movistar Team	+ 1' 08"
6	Tiesj Benoot (BEL)	Team DSM	+ 1' 14"
7	Lucas Hamilton (AUS)	Team BikeExchange	+ 1' 16"
8	Luis León Sánchez (ESP)	Astana–Premier Tech	+ 1' 21"
9	Pierre Latour (FRA)	Total Direct Énergie	+ 1' 21"
10	Aurélien Paret-Peintre (FRA)	AG2R Citroën Team	+ 1' 23"

=== Stage 7 ===
13 March 2021 — ~~Nice~~ Le Broc to Valdeblore La Colmiane, ~~166.5 km (103.5 mi)~~ 119.2 km (74.1 mi)

Stage 7 Result
Rank	Rider	Team	Time
1	Primož Roglič (SLO)	Team Jumbo–Visma	3h 09' 18"
2	Gino Mäder (SUI)	Team Bahrain Victorious	+ 2"
3	Maximilian Schachmann (GER)	Bora–Hansgrohe	+ 5"
4	Lucas Hamilton (AUS)	Team BikeExchange	+ 8"
5	Aleksandr Vlasov (RUS)	Astana–Premier Tech	+ 10"
6	Tiesj Benoot (BEL)	Team DSM	+ 10"
7	Guillaume Martin (FRA)	Cofidis	+ 15"
8	Ion Izagirre (ESP)	Astana–Premier Tech	+ 15"
9	Harm Vanhoucke (BEL)	Lotto–Soudal	+ 22"
10	Jai Hindley (AUS)	Team DSM	+ 27"

General classification after Stage 7
Rank	Rider	Team	Time
1	Primož Roglič (SLO)	Team Jumbo–Visma	26h 32' 01"
2	Maximilian Schachmann (GER)	Bora–Hansgrohe	+ 52"
3	Aleksandr Vlasov (RUS)	Astana–Premier Tech	+ 1' 11"
4	Ion Izagirre (ESP)	Astana–Premier Tech	+ 1' 15"
5	Tiesj Benoot (BEL)	Team DSM	+ 1' 34"
6	Lucas Hamilton (AUS)	Team BikeExchange	+ 1' 34"
7	Guillaume Martin (FRA)	Cofidis	+ 2' 06"
8	Steven Kruijswijk (NED)	Team Jumbo–Visma	+ 2' 07"
9	Jack Haig (AUS)	Team Bahrain Victorious	+ 2' 10"
10	Matteo Jorgenson (USA)	Movistar Team	+ 2' 21"

=== Stage 8 ===
14 March 2021 — ~~Nice~~ Le Plan du Var to ~~Nice~~ Levens, ~~110.5 km (68.7 mi)~~ 92.7 km (57.6 mi)

Stage 8 Result
Rank	Rider	Team	Time
1	Magnus Cort (DEN)	EF Education–Nippo	2h 16' 58"
2	Christophe Laporte (FRA)	Cofidis	+ 0"
3	Pierre Latour (FRA)	Total Direct Énergie	+ 0"
4	Dylan Teuns (BEL)	Team Bahrain Victorious	+ 0"
5	Warren Barguil (FRA)	Arkéa–Samsic	+ 0"
6	Dylan van Baarle (NED)	INEOS Grenadiers	+ 0"
7	Ion Izagirre (ESP)	Astana–Premier Tech	+ 0"
8	Matteo Jorgenson (USA)	Movistar Team	+ 0"
9	Yves Lampaert (BEL)	Deceuninck–Quick-Step	+ 0"
10	Maximilian Schachmann (GER)	Bora–Hansgrohe	+ 0"

General classification after Stage 8
Rank	Rider	Team	Time
1	Maximilian Schachmann (GER)	Bora–Hansgrohe	28h 49' 51"
2	Aleksandr Vlasov (RUS)	Astana–Premier Tech	+ 19"
3	Ion Izagirre (ESP)	Astana–Premier Tech	+ 23"
4	Lucas Hamilton (AUS)	Team BikeExchange	+ 41"
5	Tiesj Benoot (BEL)	Team DSM	+ 42"
6	Guillaume Martin (FRA)	Cofidis	+ 1' 14"
7	Jack Haig (AUS)	Team Bahrain Victorious	+ 1' 18"
8	Matteo Jorgenson (USA)	Movistar Team	+ 1' 29"
9	Aurélien Paret-Peintre (FRA)	AG2R Citroën Team	+ 1' 31"
10	Gino Mäder (SUI)	Team Bahrain Victorious	+ 1' 32"

== Classification leadership table ==
Classification leadership by stage
Stage	Winner	General classification	Points classification	Mountains classification	Young rider classification	Team classification	Combativity award
1	Sam Bennett	Sam Bennett	Sam Bennett	Fabien Doubey	Jasper Philipsen	Israel Start-Up Nation	Fabien Doubey
2	Cees Bol	Michael Matthews	Sam Bennett	Fabien Doubey	Florian Vermeersch	Israel Start-Up Nation	Michael Matthews
3	Stefan Bissegger	Stefan Bissegger	Sam Bennett	Fabien Doubey	Stefan Bissegger	Deceuninck–Quick-Step	not awarded
4	Primož Roglič	Primož Roglič	Primož Roglič	Anthony Perez	Brandon McNulty	Astana–Premier Tech	Julien Bernard
5	Sam Bennett	Primož Roglič	Sam Bennett	Anthony Perez	Brandon McNulty	Astana–Premier Tech	Oliver Naesen
6	Primož Roglič	Primož Roglič	Primož Roglič	Anthony Perez	Aleksandr Vlasov	Astana–Premier Tech	Kenny Elissonde
7	Primož Roglič	Primož Roglič	Primož Roglič	Anthony Perez	Aleksandr Vlasov	Astana–Premier Tech	Gino Mäder
8	Magnus Cort	Maximilian Schachmann	Primož Roglič	Anthony Perez	Aleksandr Vlasov	Astana–Premier Tech	Warren Barguil
Final		Maximilian Schachmann	Primož Roglič	Anthony Perez	Aleksandr Vlasov	Astana–Premier Tech	Not awarded

- On stage 2, Mads Pedersen, who was third in the points classification, wore the green jersey, because first-placed Sam Bennett wore the yellow jersey as the leader of the general classification and second-placed Arnaud Démare wore the jersey of the French national road race champion.
- On stage 4, Brandon McNulty, who was second in the young rider classification, wore the white jersey, because first-placed Stefan Bissegger wore the yellow jersey as the leader of the general classification.
- On stages 5, 7, and 8, Sam Bennett, who was second in the points classification, wore the green jersey, because first-placed Primož Roglič wore the yellow jersey as the leader of the general classification.

== Final classification standings ==
Legend
Denotes the winner of the general classification	Denotes the winner of the young rider classification
Denotes the winner of the points classification	Denotes the winner of the team classification
Denotes the winner of the mountains classification	Denotes the winner of the combativity award

=== General classification ===
Final general classification (1–10)
Rank	Rider	Team	Time
1	Maximilian Schachmann (GER)	Bora–Hansgrohe	28h 49' 51"
2	Aleksandr Vlasov (RUS)	Astana–Premier Tech	+ 19"
3	Ion Izagirre (ESP)	Astana–Premier Tech	+ 23"
4	Lucas Hamilton (AUS)	Team BikeExchange	+ 41"
5	Tiesj Benoot (BEL)	Team DSM	+ 42"
6	Guillaume Martin (FRA)	Cofidis	+ 1' 14"
7	Jack Haig (AUS)	Team Bahrain Victorious	+ 1' 18"
8	Matteo Jorgenson (USA)	Movistar Team	+ 1' 29"
9	Aurélien Paret-Peintre (FRA)	AG2R Citroën Team	+ 1' 31"
10	Gino Mäder (SUI)	Team Bahrain Victorious	+ 1' 32"

=== Points classification ===
Final points classification (1–10)
Rank	Rider	Team	Points
1	Primož Roglič (SLO)	Team Jumbo–Visma	57
2	Sam Bennett (IRL)	Deceuninck–Quick-Step	39
3	Christophe Laporte (FRA)	Cofidis	34
4	Michael Matthews (AUS)	Team BikeExchange	28
5	Maximilian Schachmann (GER)	Bora–Hansgrohe	26
6	Lucas Hamilton (AUS)	Team BikeExchange	21
7	Bryan Coquard (FRA)	B&B Hotels p/b KTM	21
8	Mads Pedersen (DEN)	Trek–Segafredo	21
9	Magnus Cort (DEN)	EF Education–Nippo	15
10	Stefan Bissegger (SUI)	EF Education–Nippo	15

=== Mountains classification ===
Final mountains classification (1–10)
Rank	Rider	Team	Points
1	Anthony Perez (FRA)	Cofidis	67
2	Julien Bernard (FRA)	Trek–Segafredo	26
3	Primož Roglič (SLO)	Team Jumbo–Visma	20
4	Fabien Doubey (FRA)	Total Direct Énergie	20
5	Kenny Elissonde (FRA)	Trek–Segafredo	15
6	Maximilian Schachmann (GER)	Bora–Hansgrohe	14
7	Oliver Naesen (BEL)	AG2R Citroën Team	7
8	Victor Campenaerts (BEL)	Team Qhubeka Assos	6
9	Dylan van Baarle (NED)	INEOS Grenadiers	5
10	Warren Barguil (FRA)	Arkéa–Samsic	5

=== Young rider classification ===
Final young rider classification (1–10)
Rank	Rider	Team	Time
1	Aleksandr Vlasov (RUS)	Astana–Premier Tech	28h 50' 10"
2	Lucas Hamilton (AUS)	Team BikeExchange	+ 22"
3	Matteo Jorgenson (USA)	Movistar Team	+ 1' 10"
4	Aurélien Paret-Peintre (FRA)	AG2R Citroën Team	+ 1' 12"
5	Gino Mäder (SUI)	Team Bahrain Victorious	+ 1' 13"
6	Harm Vanhoucke (BEL)	Lotto–Soudal	+ 1' 22"
7	Jai Hindley (AUS)	Team DSM	+ 2' 17"
8	Neilson Powless (USA)	EF Education–Nippo	+ 5' 18"
9	Dorian Godon (FRA)	AG2R Citroën Team	+ 20' 38"
10	Matteo Sobrero (ITA)	Astana–Premier Tech	+ 23' 56"

=== Team classification ===
Final team classification (1–10)
Rank	Team	Time
1	Astana–Premier Tech	86h 32' 39"
2	Team Bahrain Victorious	+ 3' 02"
3	AG2R Citroën Team	+ 7' 12"
4	Cofidis	+ 21' 37"
5	Team Jumbo–Visma	+ 23' 54"
6	Movistar Team	+ 26' 12"
7	Team Qhubeka Assos	+ 29' 53"
8	Trek–Segafredo	+ 41' 37"
9	Team DSM	+ 42' 15"
10	INEOS Grenadiers	+ 42' 38"
