= Max Schachmann =

German cyclist (born 1994)

Maximilian Schachmann
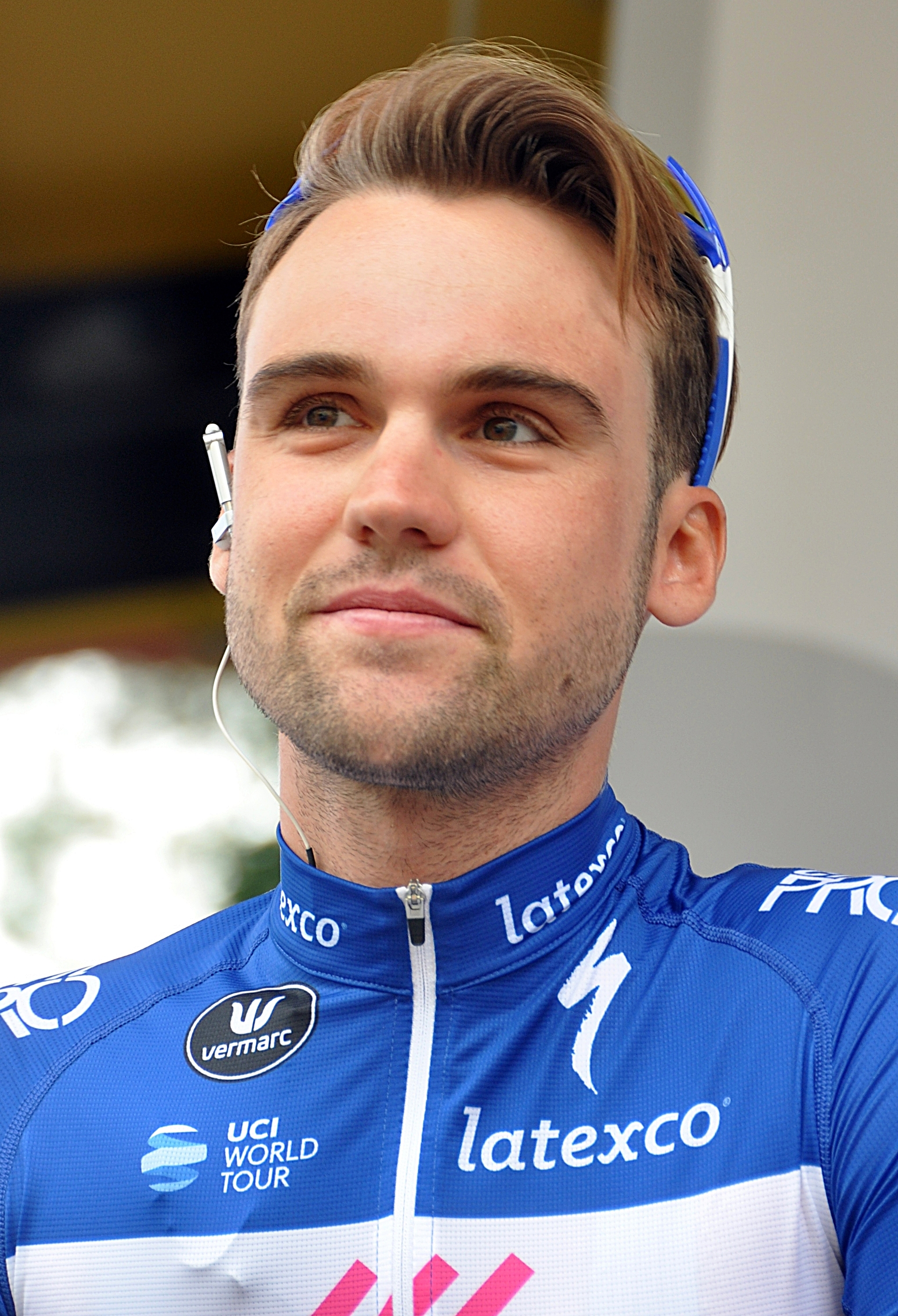
- Schachmann at 2018 Deutschland Tour

Personal information
- Full name: Maximilian Schachmann
- Born: 9 January 1994 (age 32) Berlin, Germany
- Height: 1.83 m (6 ft 0 in)
- Weight: 70 kg (154 lb)

Cycling career
- Sport: Cycling
- Current team: Soudal–Quick-Step
- Discipline: Road
- Role: Rider
- Rider type: All-rounder

Professional teams
- 2013: Thüringer Energie Team
- 2014: Development Team Giant–Shimano
- 2015–2016: AWT–GreenWay
- 2017–2018: Quick-Step Floors
- 2019–2024: Bora–Hansgrohe
- 2025–: Soudal–Quick-Step

Major wins
- Grand Tours Giro d'Italia 1 individual stage (2018) Stage races Paris–Nice (2020, 2021) One-day races and Classics National Road Race Championships (2019, 2021) National Time Trial Championships (2025) GP Industria & Artigianato (2019)
Medal record
Men's road bicycle racing
World Championships
Representing Germany
Silver medal – second place	2015 Richmond	Under-23 time trial
Silver medal – second place	2016 Doha	Under-23 time trial
Silver medal – second place	2024 Zurich	Mixed team relay
Bronze medal – third place	2012 Limburg	Under-23 time trial
Representing Quick-Step Floors
Gold medal – first place	2018 Innsbruck	Team time trial
European Championships
Representing Germany
Bronze medal – third place	2018 Brno	Time trial
Silver medal – second place	2015 Tartu	Under-23 time trial

Maximilian Schachmann (born 9 January 1994) is a German cyclist, who currently rides for UCI WorldTeam Soudal–Quick-Step. In 2012, he was nominated Germany's 'Cyclist of the Year'. He rode in the 2018 Giro d'Italia, where he won stage 18.

== Early life ==
Schachmann was born in Berlin and grew up on the outskirts of the city. His school was 6 kilometres (3.7 miles) away from his home and since buses only ran once an hour, he took the bicycle to school, igniting his interest in pursuing cycling as a career.

== Career ==
=== 2017–2018: Quick-Step Floors ===
Schachmann turned professional in 2017 with Quick-Step Floors. He had to end his season early after a crash on stage 5 of the Tour de Pologne.

In 2018, Schachmann had a break-out season. After an eighth-place finish at the Flèche Wallonne, he went to his first Grand Tour, starting the 2018 Giro d'Italia. Here, he won the stage to Prato Nevoso. He added a bronze medal in the time trial at the UEC European Road Championships to his record as well as a stage win and third overall at the Deutschland Tour.

=== 2019–present: Bora–Hansgrohe ===
==== 2019 ====
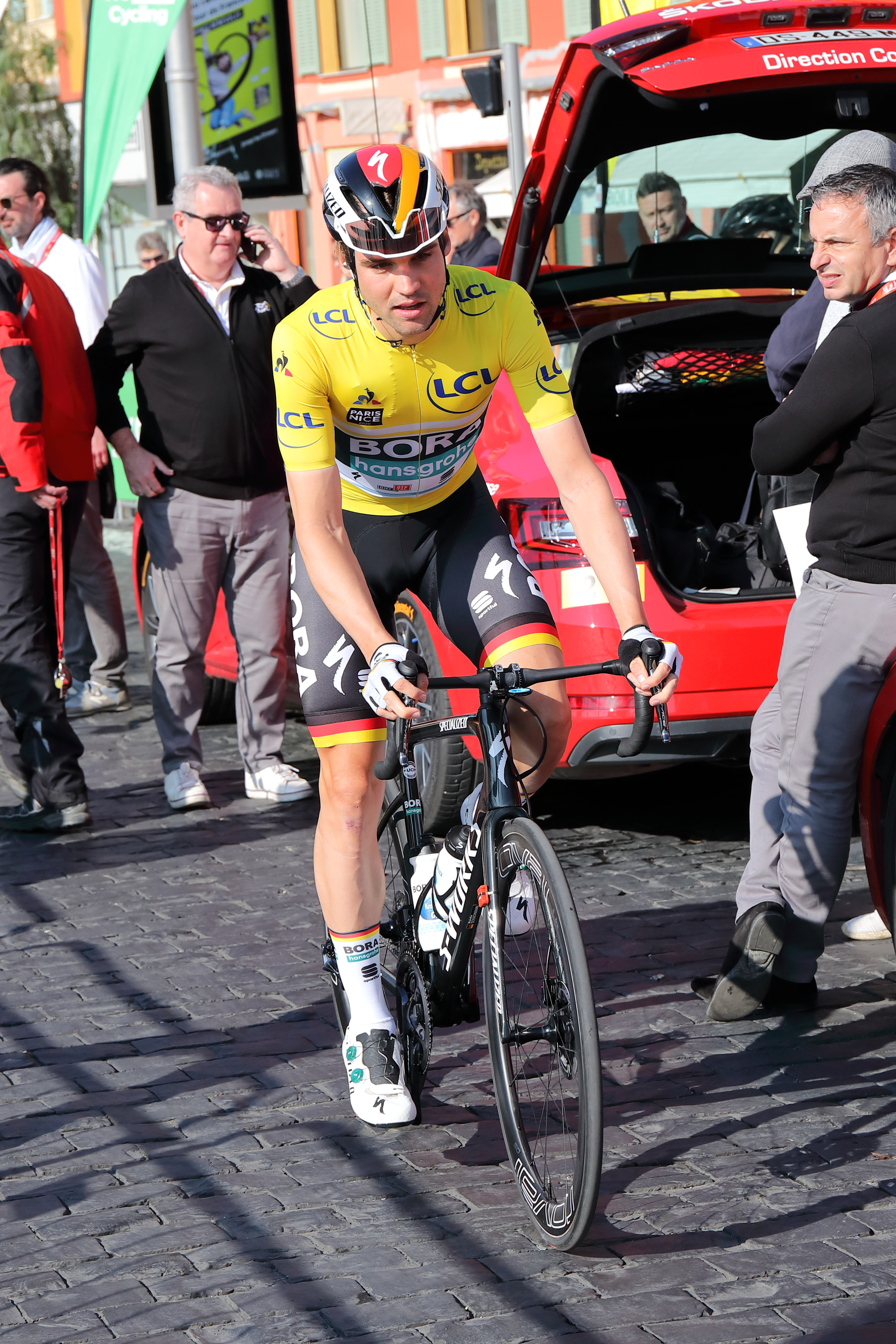
Schachmann at the 2020 Paris–Nice, a race that he eventually won

For 2019, Schachmann moved to German squad Bora–Hansgrohe. In March, he won a stage of the Volta a Catalunya. At the Tour of the Basque Country, Schachmann won the stage-one time trial to take the overall lead, before securing two more stage wins on stages 3 and 4. He then competed in the Ardennes classics, placing fifth at both the Amstel Gold Race and the Flèche Wallonne and then claimed third place at Liège–Bastogne–Liège.

On 30 June, Schachmann won the German National Road Race Championships, coming in first in a Bora–Hansgrohe 1–2–3 finish during a demanding race in extreme heat of up to 40 °C (104 °F), where only 15 of 190 starters reached the finish line. In July 2019, he was named in the startlist for the 2019 Tour de France. During the stage-13 time trial, he was on his way to post a good time, when he crashed near the end of the course. While he finished the stage, he was later diagnosed with multiple fractures to his hand and had to abandon the Tour.

==== 2020 ====
At the beginning of the 2020 season, Schachmann placed second to Remco Evenepoel at the Volta ao Algarve. In March 2020, Schachmann won Paris–Nice in an edition shortened by one stage due to the COVID-19 pandemic. He won the first stage and then held on to an eventual lead of 18 seconds over Tiesj Benoot to become the fifth German winner of the event, and the first since Tony Martin in 2011.

Schachmann continued in good form following the return to racing in August, taking third place at Strade Bianche. At Il Lombardia, he suffered an accident when a car entered the race course 3 kilometres (1.9 miles) from the finish. He continued to the finish, where he placed seventh, but fractured his collarbone in the incident. Despite the incident, Schachmann was announced as part of Bora–Hansgrohe's Tour de France octet.

==== 2021 ====
In March, he successfully defended his title at Paris–Nice, taking the race lead over Primož Roglič after a crash. He had a strong remainder of the spring season as well, placing third in the Amstel Gold Race and fourth in the Tour de Suisse. In June, he won the German National Road Race Championships. The following month, he placed 10th in the Road race at the Summer Olympics.

== Major results ==
2011
2nd Road race, National Junior Road Championships
2012
3rd Time trial, UCI Junior Road World Championships
9th Time trial, UEC European Junior Road Championships
2013
9th Time trial, UEC European Under-23 Road Championships
2014
2nd Time trial, National Under-23 Road Championships
5th Time trial, UCI Under-23 Road World Championships
5th Time trial, UEC European Under-23 Road Championships
2015
2nd Time trial, UCI Under-23 Road World Championships
3rd Time trial, UEC European Under-23 Road Championships
8th Overall Tour de Berlin
2016
1st Time trial, National Under-23 Road Championships
1st Overall Tour Alsace

1st Young rider classification
1st Stage 3

2nd Time trial, UCI Under-23 Road World Championships
2nd Overall Tour de Berlin
3rd Overall Le Triptyque des Monts et Châteaux
7th Overall Giro della Valle d'Aosta

1st Stage 3

2017
National Road Championships

4th Time trial
5th Road race

4th Overall Ster ZLM Toer
10th Le Samyn
2018 (3 pro wins)
1st Team time trial, UCI Road World Championships
Giro d'Italia

1st Stage 18
Held after Stages 1–5

1st Stage 6 Volta a Catalunya
2nd Classic de l'Ardèche
3rd Time trial, UEC European Road Championships
3rd Overall Deutschland Tour

1st Stage 2

4th Time trial, National Road Championships
4th Overall BinckBank Tour
7th Overall Volta ao Algarve
8th La Flèche Wallonne
2019 (6)
1st Road race, National Road Championships
1st GP Industria & Artigianato di Larciano
1st Stage 5 Volta a Catalunya
3rd Liège–Bastogne–Liège
5th Amstel Gold Race
5th La Flèche Wallonne
10th Overall Tour of the Basque Country

1st Points classification
1st Stages 1 (ITT), 3 & 4

10th Overall Tour of California
2020 (2)
1st Overall Paris–Nice

1st Stage 1

2nd Overall Volta ao Algarve
3rd Strade Bianche
7th Giro di Lombardia
9th Road race, UCI Road World Championships
Combativity award Stage 13 Tour de France
2021 (2)
1st Road race, National Road Championships
1st Overall Paris–Nice
3rd Amstel Gold Race
4th Overall Tour de Suisse
9th Liège–Bastogne–Liège
10th Road race, Olympic Games
10th La Flèche Wallonne
2022
2nd Grosser Preis des Kantons Aargau
10th Overall Tour de Suisse
2023 (1)
1st Stage 3 Sibiu Cycling Tour
National Road Championships

3rd Road race
3rd Time trial

2024
2nd Team relay, UCI Road World Championships
2nd Time trial, National Road Championships
9th Overall Renewi Tour
9th Time trial, Olympic Games
9th GP Miguel Induráin
2025 (2)
1st Time trial, National Road Championships
3rd Overall Tour of the Basque Country

1st Stage 1 (ITT)

5th Overall Volta ao Algarve
2026
4th Time trial, National Road Championships
9th Overall Deutschland Tour
10th Grand Prix Cycliste de Québec

=== General classification results timeline ===
Grand Tour general classification results
Grand Tour	2017	2018	2019	2020	2021	2022	2023	2024	2025	2026
Giro d'Italia	—	31	—	—	—	—	—	45	—	—
Tour de France	—	—	DNF	57	—	46	—	—	68	—
Vuelta a España	—	—	—	—	DNF	—	—	—	74	—
Major stage race general classification results
Major stage race	2017	2018	2019	2020	2021	2022	2023	2024	2025	2026
Paris–Nice	—	—	—	1	1	DNF	DNF	—	17	—
Tirreno–Adriatico	—	—	—	—	—	—	—	—	—	—
Volta a Catalunya	99	68	12	NH	—	—	—	—	—	—
Tour of the Basque Country	—	—	10	NH	27	—	—	13	3	—
Tour de Romandie	19	—	—	NH	—	—	—	—	—	61
Critérium du Dauphiné	—	—	—	—	—	—	—	—	63	—
Tour de Suisse	—	—	—	NH	4	10	14	—	—	49

=== Classics results timeline ===
Monument	2017	2018	2019	2020	2021	2022	2023	2024	2025	2026
Milan–San Remo	—	—	—	—	14	—	—	—	33	26
Tour of Flanders	—	—	—	98	—	—	—	—	—	—
Paris–Roubaix	—	—	—	—	77	—	—	—	—	—
Liège–Bastogne–Liège	—	35	3	DNF	9	—	—	—	92	30
Giro di Lombardia	—	—	73	7	—	—	—	—	—	
Classic	2017	2018	2019	2020	2021	2022	2023	2024	2025	2026
Strade Bianche	—	DNF	29	3	—	—	—	—	—	—
Amstel Gold Race	105	—	5	NH	3	—	—	106	53	—
La Flèche Wallonne	115	8	5	—	10	—	—	—	—	—
Grand Prix Cycliste de Québec	—	—	—	Not held		—	—	27	—	10
Grand Prix Cycliste de Montréal	—	—	—	Not held		—	—	39	—	

Legend
—	Did not compete
DNF	Did not finish
NH	Not held
