= Gattières =

Commune in Provence-Alpes-Côte d'Azur, France

- Commune
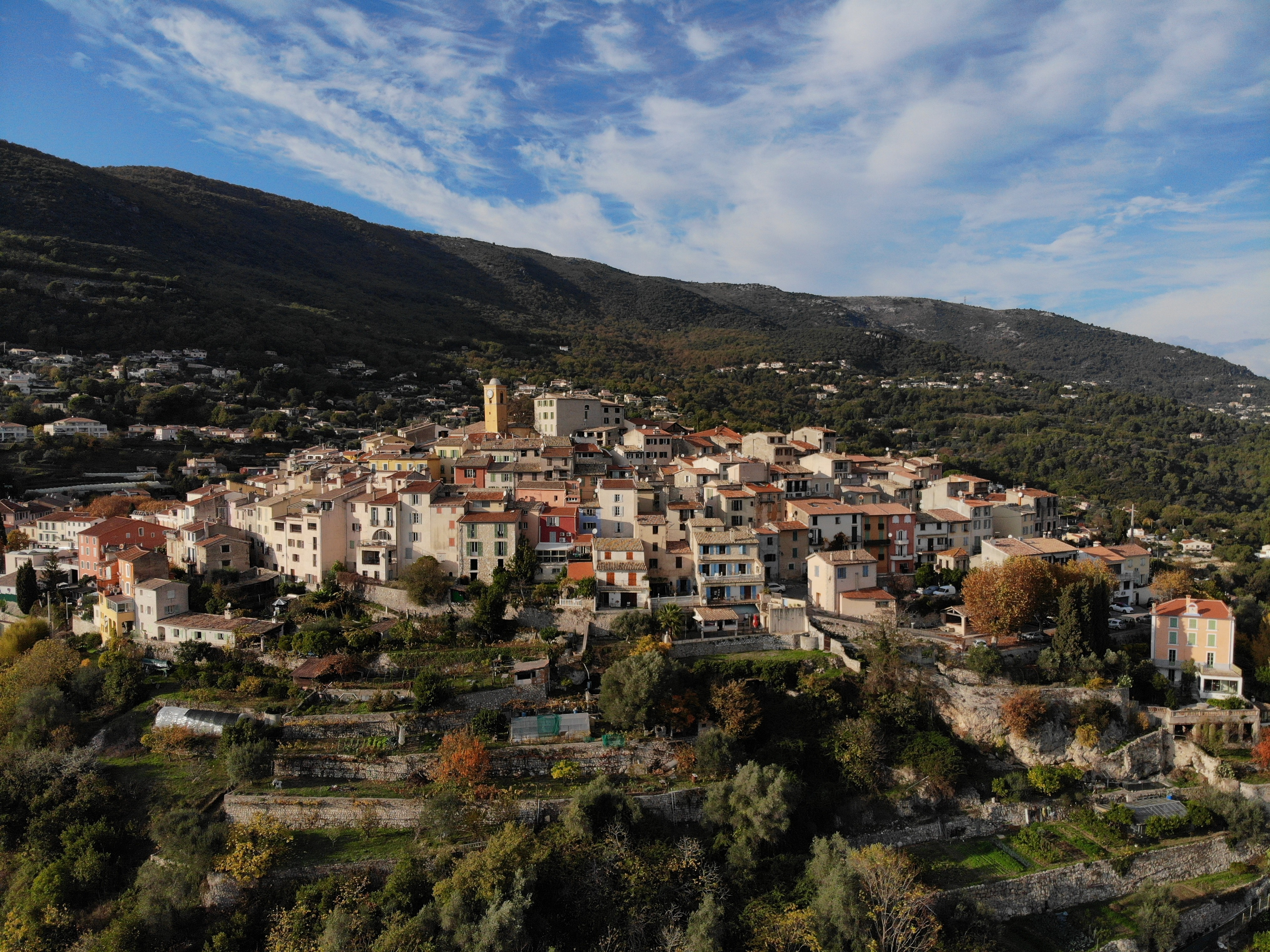

- Coat of arms
- Location of Gattières
- Location within France Location within Provence-Alpes-Côte d'Azur
- Coordinates: 43°45′37″N 7°10′36″E
- Country: France
- Region: Provence-Alpes-Côte d'Azur
- Department: Alpes-Maritimes
- Arrondissement: Grasse
- Canton: Nice-3
- Intercommunality: Métropole Nice Côte d'Azur

Government
  - Mayor (2026–32): Pascale Guit-Nicol
- Area^{1}: 10.03 km^{2} (3.87 sq mi)
- Highest elevation: 950 m (3,120 ft)
- Lowest elevation: 48 m (157 ft)
- Population (2023): 4,358
  - Density: 434.5/km^{2} (1,125/sq mi)
- Time zone: UTC+01:00 (CET)
  - Summer (DST): UTC+02:00 (CEST)
- INSEE/Postal code: 06064 /06510
- ^{1} French Land Register data, which excludes lakes, ponds, glaciers > 1 km^{2} (0.386 sq mi or 247 acres) and river estuaries.

Gattières (French pronunciation: [ɡatjɛʁ]; Occitan: Gatièras) is a commune in the Alpes-Maritimes department in southeastern France.

== Population ==
Historical population
Year	Pop.	±% p.a.
1968	1,005	—
1975	1,380	+4.63%
1982	2,051	+5.82%
1990	2,997	+4.86%
1999	3,583	+2.00%
2007	4,094	+1.68%
2012	4,103	+0.04%
2017	4,117	+0.07%
2023	4,358	+0.95%
Source: INSEE

== See also ==
- Communes of the Alpes-Maritimes department
