= Marco Mathis =

German cyclist (born 1994)

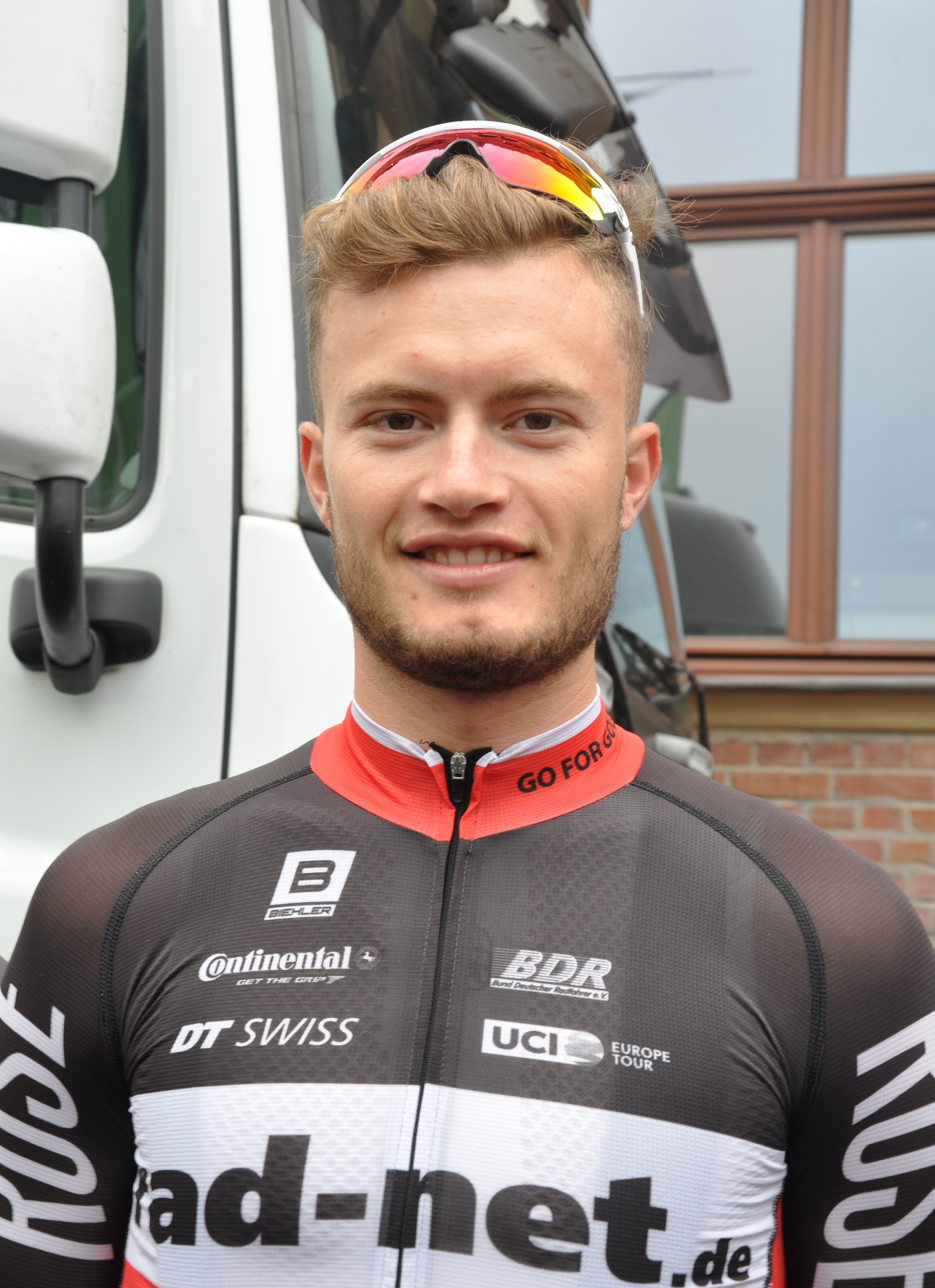
- Mathis in 2016.

Personal information
- Full name: Marco Mathis
- Born: 7 April 1994 (age 32) Tettnang, Germany

Cycling career
- Sport: Cycling
- Discipline: Road
- Role: Rider
- Rider type: Time trialist

Amateur team
- 2007–2012: TV Kressbronn

Professional teams
- 2013–2016: Rad-Net Rose Team
- 2017–2018: Team Katusha–Alpecin
- 2019–2020: Cofidis
Medal record
Men's road bicycle racing
Representing Germany
World Championships
Gold medal – first place	2016 Doha	Men's under-23 time trial
European Championships
Silver medal – second place	2019 Alkmaar	Mixed Team Relay

Marco Mathis (born 7 April 1994) is a German cyclist, who most recently rode for UCI WorldTeam Cofidis. In October 2020, he was named in the startlist for the 2020 Giro d'Italia.

== Major results ==
2012
1st Stage 1 Tour de la région de Łódź
2015
1st Team time trial, National Road Championships
2016
1st Time trial, UCI Road World Under-23 Championships
1st Team time trial, National Road Championships
National Track Championships

1st Team pursuit
1st Individual pursuit

3rd Overall Dookoła Mazowsza
2017
8th Time trial, UEC European Road Championships
2019
2nd Team relay, UEC European Road Championships

=== Grand Tour general classification results timeline ===
Grand Tour	2020
Giro d'Italia	130
Tour de France	—
Vuelta a España	—

Legend
—	Did not compete
DNF	Did not finish
