= 2019 GP Industria & Artigianato di Larciano =

- 2019 UCI Europe Tour

Race details
- Dates: 10 March 2019
- Stages: 1
- Distance: 199.2 km (123.8 mi)
- Winning time: 4h 40' 01"

Results
	Winner	Maximilian Schachmann (GER)	(Bora–Hansgrohe)
	Second	Mattia Cattaneo (ITA)	(Androni Giocattoli–Sidermec)
	Third	Andrea Vendrame (ITA)	(Androni Giocattoli–Sidermec)

The 2019 GP Industria & Artigianato di Larciano (transl. GP Industry & Handicraft of Larciano) was the 51st edition of the GP Industria & Artigianato di Larciano road cycling one-day race, which was held on 10 March 2019. The 1.HC-category race was a part of the 2019 UCI Europe Tour.

== Teams ==
Seven UCI WorldTeams, eleven UCI Professional Continental teams, six UCI Continental teams, and one national team make up the twenty-five teams that participated in the race. Only two of the twenty-five teams did not enter the maximum squad of seven riders; these two teams (Delko–Marseille Provence and Riwal Readynez) each entered six riders. Of the 173 riders, there was one non-starter, while 90 riders finished.

UCI WorldTeams

- Bora–Hansgrohe
- EF Education First
- Groupama–FDJ
- Mitchelton–Scott
- Movistar Team
- Team Katusha–Alpecin
- UAE Team Emirates

UCI Professional Continental Teams

- Androni Giocattoli–Sidermec
- Arkéa–Samsic
- Bardiani–CSF
- Caja Rural–Seguros RGA
- Delko–Marseille Provence
- Gazprom–RusVelo
- Israel Cycling Academy
- Neri Sottoli–Selle Italia–KTM
- Nippo–Vini Fantini–Faizanè
- Riwal Readynez
- Team Novo Nordisk

UCI Continental Teams

- Biesse–Carrera
- Dimension Data for Qhubeka
- Giotti Victoria–Palomar
- Sangemini–Trevigiani–MG.K Vis
- Team Beltrami TSA–Hopplà–Petroli Firenze
- Team Colpack

National Teams

- Italy

== Result ==
Result
Rank	Rider	Team	Time
1	Maximilian Schachmann (GER)	Bora–Hansgrohe	4h 40' 01"
2	Mattia Cattaneo (ITA)	Androni Giocattoli–Sidermec	+ 0"
3	Andrea Vendrame (ITA)	Androni Giocattoli–Sidermec	+ 14"
4	Paolo Totò (ITA)	Sangemini–Trevigiani–MG.K Vis	+ 14"
5	Davide Villella (ITA)	Italy	+ 14"
6	Giovanni Visconti (ITA)	Neri Sottoli–Selle Italia–KTM	+ 14"
7	Evgeny Shalunov (RUS)	Gazprom–RusVelo	+ 14"
8	Matteo Montaguti (ITA)	Androni Giocattoli–Sidermec	+ 14"
9	Eduard Prades (ESP)	Movistar Team	+ 14"
10	Lucas Eriksson (SWE)	Riwal Readynez	+ 14"
