= 2016 UCI Road World Championships – Men's under-23 time trial =

Men's under-23 time trial
2016 UCI Road World Championships
- Time trial Rainbow jersey

Race details
- Dates: 10 October 2016
- Stages: 1
- Distance: 28.9 km (18.0 mi)
- Winning time: 34' 08.09"

Medalists
	Gold	Marco Mathis (Germany)
	Silver	Maximilian Schachmann (Germany)
	Bronze	Miles Scotson (Australia)

The Men's under-23 time trial of the 2016 UCI Road World Championships took place in and around in Doha, Qatar on 10 October 2016. The course of the race was 28.9 km (18.0 mi).

German riders took the first two placings, as Marco Mathis took the gold medal and rainbow jersey by 18.63 seconds ahead of fellow countryman Maximilian Schachmann, despite nearly being hit by an ambulance during his run. The bronze medal went to Australia's Miles Scotson, 19.35 seconds behind Schachmann and 37.98 seconds in arrears of the gold medal winner Mathis.

== Qualification ==
=== Qualification for the event ===
All National Federations were allowed to enter four riders for the race, with a maximum of two riders to start. In addition to this number, the outgoing World Champion and the current continental champions were also able to take part.

== Schedule ==
All times are in Arabia Standard Time (UTC+3).

Date	Time	Event
10 October 2016	11:30–15:50	Men's under-23 time trial

== Final classification ==
Rank	Rider	Time
1	(Germany) Marco Mathis (DEU)	34' 08.09"
2	(Germany) Maximilian Schachmann (DEU)	+ 18.63"
3	(Australia) Miles Scotson (AUS)	+ 37.98"
4	(Germany) Lennard Kämna (DEU)	+ 42.30"
5	(Denmark) Kasper Asgreen (DNK)	+ 50.58"
6	(United States) Neilson Powless (USA)	+ 54.17"
7	(United States) Geoffrey Curran (USA)	+ 1' 05.45"
8	(Switzerland) Tom Bohli (SUI)	+ 1' 16.24"
9	(Republic of Ireland) Eddie Dunbar (IRL)	+ 1' 21.59"
10	(Australia) Callum Scotson (AUS)	+ 1' 22.30"
11	(South Africa) Stefan de Bod (RSA)	+ 1' 22.63"
12	(Canada) Alec Cowan (CAN)	+ 1' 26.26"
13	(France) Rémi Cavagna (FRA)	+ 1' 28.04"
14	(Italy) Filippo Ganna (ITA)	+ 1' 37.13"
15	(United Kingdom) Jonathan Dibben (GBR)	+ 1' 38.31"
16	(Canada) Sean MacKinnon (CAN)	+ 1' 43.86"
17	(Denmark) Mads Pedersen (DNK)	+ 1' 50.79"
18	(Switzerland) Martin Schäppi (SUI)	+ 1' 53.53"
19	(France) Corentin Ermenault (FRA)	+ 1' 58.40"
20	(Italy) Edoardo Affini (ITA)	+ 1' 59.53"
21	(Denmark) Mads Würtz Schmidt (DNK)	+ 2' 02.71"
22	(Slovenia) Izidor Penko (SLO)	+ 2' 10.67"
23	(Austria) Patrick Gamper (AUT)	+ 2' 11.13"
24	(Hungary) János Pelikán (HUN)	+ 2' 18.46"
25	(Luxembourg) Tom Wirtgen (LUX)	+ 2' 21.21"
26	(United Kingdom) Tao Geoghegan Hart (GBR)	+ 2' 22.83"
27	(Belgium) Nathan Van Hooydonck (BEL)	+ 2' 25.35"
28	(Netherlands) Pascal Eenkhoorn (NED)	+ 2' 26.77"
29	(Russia) Artem Nych (RUS)	+ 2' 33.44"
30	(Colombia) Daniel Martínez (COL)	+ 2' 33.46"
31	(Spain) Gonzalo Serrano (ESP)	+ 2' 41.42"
32	(Poland) Szymon Rekita (POL)	+ 2' 53.23"
33	(Eritrea) Amanuel Gebrezgabihier (ERI)	+ 2' 58.80"
34	(Ukraine) Nazar Lahodych (UKR)	+ 3' 04.32"
35	(Poland) Przemysław Kasperkiewicz (POL)	+ 3' 17.64"
36	(Portugal) Ivo Oliveira (POR)	+ 3' 17.67"
37	(Estonia) Silver Mäoma (EST)	+ 3' 21.06"
38	(Luxembourg) Ivan Centrone (LUX)	+ 3' 27.01"
39	(New Zealand) Sam Dobbs (NZL)	+ 3' 29.02"
40	(Russia) Pavel Sivakov (RUS)	+ 3' 33.21"
41	(Netherlands) Jan-Willem van Schip (NED)	+ 3' 34.72"
42	(Iran) Mahdi Rajabikaboodcheshmeh (IRI)	+ 3' 38.28"
43	(Ukraine) Timur Maleev (UKR)	+ 3' 40.75"
44	(Eritrea) Merhawi Kudus (ERI)	+ 3' 42.88"
45	(Republic of Ireland) Michael O'Loughlin (IRL)	+ 3' 44.14"
46	(Latvia) Krists Neilands (LAT)	+ 3' 45.14"
47	(Belgium) Senne Leysen (BEL)	+ 3' 55.14"
48	(Algeria) Abderrahmane Mansouri (ALG)	+ 3' 59.87"
49	(Iran) Mohammad Ganjkhanlou (IRI)	+ 4' 18.85"
50	(Kazakhstan) Yuriy Natarov (KAZ)	+ 4' 22.30"
51	(Slovenia) Jon Božič (SLO)	+ 4' 24.93"
52	(Latvia) Eriks-Toms Gavars (LAT)	+ 4' 25.41"
53	(Monaco) Victor Langellotti (MON)	+ 4' 26.14"
54	(Egypt) Islam Shawky (EGY)	+ 4' 28.24"
55	(Algeria) Nassim Saidi (ALG)	+ 4' 38.81"
56	(Hong Kong) Fung Ka Hoo (HKG)	+ 4' 54.10"
57	(Rwanda) Joseph Areruya (RWA)	+ 4' 59.40"
58	(Kazakhstan) Stepan Astafyev (KAZ)	+ 5' 13.85"
59	(Lithuania) Raimondas Rumšas (LTU)	+ 5' 29.06"
60	(Mongolia) Maral-Erdene Batmunkh (MGL)	+ 5' 50.79"
61	(Mongolia) Enkhtaivan Bolor-Erdene (MGL)	+ 6' 06.51"
62	(North Macedonia) Andrej Petrovski (MKD)	+ 6' 13.38"
63	(Mongolia) Bilguunjargal Erdenebat (MGL)	+ 6' 45.56"
64	(Saudi Arabia) Nazar Alabuabdulla (KSA)	+ 7' 19.86"
65	(Kuwait) Khaled Alkhalaifah (KUW)	+ 7' 47.22"
66	(Kuwait) Abdulhadi Alajmi (KUW)	+ 8' 14.28"
67	(Saudi Arabia) Hassan Aljumah (KSA)	+ 8' 15.28"
68	(Uzbekistan) Akramjon Sunnatov (UZB)	+ 8' 41.81"
69	(Bahrain) Yahiaaldeen Khalefa (BHR)	+ 9' 11.62"
70	(Kosovo) Egzon Misini (KOS)	+ 10' 56.40"
71	(Kosovo) Luan Haliti (KOS)	+ 18' 50.09"
DNF	(Sudan) Yosif Yousif Ibrahim (SUD)	—
DNF	(New Zealand) Hayden McCormick (NZL)	—
DNS	(Ethiopia) Getachow Atsbha (ETH)	—
