= 2018 Deutschland Tour =

2018 UCI Europe Tour

Race details
- Dates: August 23–26, 2018
- Stages: 4
- Distance: 737.5 km (458.3 mi)
- Winning time: 17h 27' 10"

Results
Jersey awarded to the overall winner	Winner	Matej Mohorič (SLO)	(Bahrain–Merida)
	Second	Nils Politt (GER)	(Team Katusha–Alpecin)
	Third	Maximilian Schachmann (GER)	(Quick-Step Floors)
Jersey awarded to the points classification winner	Points	Matej Mohorič (SLO)	(Bahrain–Merida)
Jersey awarded to the mountains classification winner	Mountains	Robin Carpenter (USA)	(Rally Cycling)
Jersey awarded to the young rider classification winner	Young rider	Matej Mohorič (SLO)	(Bahrain–Merida)
	Team	AG2R La Mondiale	

The 2018 Deutschland Tour was a road cycling stage race that took place between 23 and 26 August 2018. After a 10-year break, the Deutschland Tour held its 33rd edition and was rated as a 2.1 event as part of the 2018 UCI Europe Tour.

== Teams ==
The 22 teams invited to the race were:

UCI World Tour teams

- AG2R La Mondiale
- Bahrain–Merida
- BMC Racing Team
- Bora–Hansgrohe
- Lotto–Soudal
- Movistar Team
- Quick-Step Floors
- Team Dimension Data
- Team Katusha–Alpecin
- Team Sky
- Team Sunweb

UCI Professional Continental teams

- Gazprom–RusVelo
- Israel Cycling Academy
- Rally Cycling
- Roompot–Nederlandse Loterij
- Fortuneo–Samsic
- Wanty–Groupe Gobert

UCI Continental teams

- Heizomat–rad-net.de
- Leopard Pro Cycling
- Dauner D&DQ–Akkon
- Team Lotto–Kern Haus
- Team Sauerland NRW p/b SKS Germany

== Route ==
The route of the 2018 Deutschland Tour ran through southwestern Germany, crossing the states of Rhineland-Palatinate, North Rhine-Westphalia, Baden-Württemberg, Saarland and Hesse, and covered more than 737 kilometers. Due to the hilly terrain, the course was mainly suited for sprinters and aggressive classics riders.

Stage characteristics and winners
Stage	Date	Course	Distance	Type	Winner
1	23 August	Koblenz to Bonn	157 km (98 mi)	Flat stage	Álvaro José Hodeg (COL)
2	24 August	Bonn to Trier	196 km (122 mi)	Hilly stage	Maximilian Schachmann (GER)
3	25 August	Trier to Merzig	177 km (110 mi)	Hilly stage	Matej Mohorič (SLO)
4	26 August	Lorsch to Stuttgart	207.5 km (129 mi)	Flat stage	Nils Politt (GER)
	Total		737.5 km (458 mi)		

== Stages ==
=== Stage 1 ===
23 August 2018 — Koblenz to Bonn, 157 km (98 mi)

Result of Stage 1
Rank	Rider	Team	Time
1	Álvaro José Hodeg (COL)	Quick-Step Floors	3h 35' 08"
2	Pascal Ackermann (GER)	Bora–Hansgrohe	+ 0"
3	Niccolò Bonifazio (ITA)	Bahrain–Merida	+ 0"
4	Reinardt Janse van Rensburg (RSA)	Team Dimension Data	+ 0"
5	Alexander Krieger (GER)	Leopard Pro Cycling	+ 0"
6	André Greipel (GER)	Lotto–Soudal	+ 0"
7	Aaron Grosser (GER)	Team Sauerland NRW p/b SKS Germany	+ 0"
8	Colin Joyce (USA)	Rally Cycling	+ 0"
9	Rick Zabel (GER)	Team Katusha–Alpecin	+ 0"
10	Kristian Sbaragli (ITA)	Israel Cycling Academy	+ 0"

General classification after Stage 1
Rank	Rider	Team	Time
1	Álvaro José Hodeg (COL)	Quick-Step Floors	3h 35' 08"
2	Pascal Ackermann (GER)	Bora–Hansgrohe	+ 4"
3	Niccolò Bonifazio (ITA)	Bahrain–Merida	+ 6"
4	Jens Reynders (BEL)	Leopard Pro Cycling	+ 7"
5	Jorge Arcas (ESP)	Movistar Team	+ 8"
6	Kevin Van Melsen (BEL)	Wanty–Groupe Gobert	+ 9"
7	Reinardt Janse van Rensburg (RSA)	Team Dimension Data	+ 10"
8	Alexander Krieger (GER)	Leopard Pro Cycling	+ 10"
9	André Greipel (GER)	Lotto–Soudal	+ 10"
10	Aaron Grosser (GER)	Team Sauerland NRW p/b SKS Germany	+ 10"

=== Stage 2 ===
24 August 2018 — Bonn to Trier, 196 km (122 mi)

Result of Stage 2
Rank	Rider	Team	Time
1	Maximilian Schachmann (GER)	Quick-Step Floors	4h 50' 36"
2	Matej Mohorič (SLO)	Bahrain–Merida	+ 0"
3	Tom Dumoulin (NED)	Team Sunweb	+ 0"
4	Nils Politt (GER)	Team Katusha–Alpecin	+ 0"
5	Reinardt Janse van Rensburg (RSA)	Team Dimension Data	+ 0"
6	Pieter Vanspeybrouck (BEL)	Wanty–Groupe Gobert	+ 0"
7	Frederik Backaert (BEL)	Wanty–Groupe Gobert	+ 0"
8	Damiano Caruso (ITA)	BMC Racing Team	+ 0"
9	Odd Christian Eiking (NOR)	Wanty–Groupe Gobert	+ 0"
10	Patrick Konrad (AUT)	Bora–Hansgrohe	+ 0"

General classification after Stage 2
Rank	Rider	Team	Time
1	Maximilian Schachmann (GER)	Quick-Step Floors	8h 25' 34"
2	Matej Mohorič (SLO)	Bahrain–Merida	+ 4"
3	Tom Dumoulin (NED)	Team Sunweb	+ 4"
4	Nils Politt (GER)	Team Katusha–Alpecin	+ 10"
5	Reinardt Janse van Rensburg (RSA)	Team Dimension Data	+ 18"
6	Pieter Vanspeybrouck (BEL)	Wanty–Groupe Gobert	+ 18"
7	Damiano Caruso (ITA)	BMC Racing Team	+ 19"
8	Frederik Backaert (BEL)	Wanty–Groupe Gobert	+ 20"
9	Romain Bardet (FRA)	AG2R La Mondiale	+ 21"
10	Nick van der Lijke (NED)	Roompot–Nederlandse Loterij	+ 22"

=== Stage 3 ===
25 August 2018 — Trier to Merzig, 177 km (110 mi)

Result of Stage 3
Rank	Rider	Team	Time
1	Matej Mohorič (SLO)	Bahrain–Merida	4h 12' 28"
2	Nils Politt (GER)	Team Katusha–Alpecin	+ 0"
3	Pieter Vanspeybrouck (BEL)	Wanty–Groupe Gobert	+ 0"
4	Jasha Sütterlin (GER)	Movistar Team	+ 0"
5	Nick van der Lijke (NED)	Roompot–Nederlandse Loterij	+ 0"
6	Vasil Kiryienka (BLR)	Team Sky	+ 0"
7	Maximilian Schachmann (GER)	Quick-Step Floors	+ 0"
8	Guillaume Martin (FRA)	Wanty–Groupe Gobert	+ 0"
9	Reinardt Janse van Rensburg (RSA)	Team Dimension Data	+ 0"
10	Jürgen Roelandts (BEL)	BMC Racing Team	+ 0"

General classification after Stage 3
Rank	Rider	Team	Time
1	Matej Mohorič (SLO)	Bahrain–Merida	12h 37' 56"
2	Maximilian Schachmann (GER)	Quick-Step Floors	+ 6"
3	Nils Politt (GER)	Team Katusha–Alpecin	+ 10"
4	Tom Dumoulin (NED)	Team Sunweb	+ 10"
5	Pieter Vanspeybrouck (BEL)	Wanty–Groupe Gobert	+ 20"
6	Reinardt Janse van Rensburg (RSA)	Team Dimension Data	+ 24"
7	Damiano Caruso (ITA)	BMC Racing Team	+ 25"
8	Warren Barguil (FRA)	Fortuneo–Samsic	+ 25"
9	Frederik Backaert (BEL)	Wanty–Groupe Gobert	+ 26"
10	Pieter Weening (NED)	Roompot–Nederlandse Loterij	+ 26"

=== Stage 4 ===
26 August 2018 — Lorsch to Stuttgart, 207.5 km (129 mi)

Result of Stage 4
Rank	Rider	Team	Time
1	Nils Politt (GER)	Team Katusha–Alpecin	4h 49' 20"
2	Matej Mohorič (SLO)	Bahrain–Merida	+ 0"
3	Damiano Caruso (ITA)	BMC Racing Team	+ 0"
4	Nick van der Lijke (NED)	Roompot–Nederlandse Loterij	+ 0"
5	Reinardt Janse van Rensburg (RSA)	Team Dimension Data	+ 0"
6	Romain Bardet (FRA)	AG2R La Mondiale	+ 0"
7	Alexis Vuillermoz (FRA)	AG2R La Mondiale	+ 0"
8	Warren Barguil (FRA)	Fortuneo–Samsic	+ 0"
9	Patrick Konrad (AUT)	Bora–Hansgrohe	+ 0"
10	Maximilian Schachmann (GER)	Quick-Step Floors	+ 0"

General classification after Stage 4
Rank	Rider	Team	Time
1	Matej Mohorič (SLO)	Bahrain–Merida	17h 27' 10"
2	Nils Politt (GER)	Team Katusha–Alpecin	+ 6"
3	Maximilian Schachmann (GER)	Quick-Step Floors	+ 12"
4	Tom Dumoulin (NED)	Team Sunweb	+ 16"
5	Damiano Caruso (ITA)	BMC Racing Team	+ 26"
6	Warren Barguil (FRA)	Fortuneo–Samsic	+ 28"
7	Reinardt Janse van Rensburg (RSA)	Team Dimension Data	+ 30"
8	Romain Bardet (FRA)	AG2R La Mondiale	+ 31"
9	Guillaume Martin (FRA)	Wanty–Groupe Gobert	+ 33"
10	Nick van der Lijke (NED)	Roompot–Nederlandse Loterij	+ 34"

== Classification leadership ==
In the 2018 Deutschland Tour, four jerseys were awarded. The general classification was calculated by adding each cyclist's finishing times on each stage. Time bonuses were awarded to the first three finishers on all stages: the stage winner won a ten-second bonus, with six and four seconds for the second and third riders respectively. Bonus seconds were also awarded to the first three riders at intermediate sprints – three seconds for the winner of the sprint, two seconds for the rider in second and one second for the rider in third. The leader of the general classification received a red engraved jersey with the names of more than 1.500 supporters who participated in the route creation. This classification was considered the most important of the 2018 Deutschland Tour, and the winner of the classification was considered the winner of the race.

Points for stage victory
Position	1	2	3	4	5	6	7	8	9	10
Points awarded	15	12	9	7	6	5	4	3	2	1

The second classification was the points classification. Riders were awarded points for finishing in the top ten in a stage. Points were also won in intermediate sprints; five points for crossing the sprint line first, three points for second place, and one for third. The leader of the points classification was awarded a green jersey sponsored by Škoda.

There was also a mountains classification, for which points were awarded for reaching the top of a climb before other riders. In each climb the top three riders earned points; three points for crossing the summit line first, two points for the second placed rider and a single point for the third. The leadership of the mountains classification was marked by a black jersey with white polka-dots.

The fourth jersey represented the young rider classification, marked by a white and dotted jersey sponsored by Dauner. Only riders born after 1 January 1993 were eligible; the young rider best placed in the general classification was the leader of the young rider classification. There was also a classification for teams, in which the times of the best three cyclists in a team on each stage were added together; the leading team at the end of the race was the team with the lowest cumulative time.

Classification leadership by stage
Stage	Winner	General classification	Points classification	Mountains classification	Young rider classification	Team classification
1	Álvaro José Hodeg	Álvaro José Hodeg	Álvaro José Hodeg	Kevin Van Melsen	Álvaro José Hodeg	Team Katusha–Alpecin
2	Maximilian Schachmann	Maximilian Schachmann	Maximilian Schachmann	Gaëtan Pons	Maximilian Schachmann	Wanty–Groupe Gobert
3	Matej Mohorič	Matej Mohorič	Matej Mohorič	Gaëtan Pons	Matej Mohorič	Wanty–Groupe Gobert
4	Nils Politt	Matej Mohorič	Matej Mohorič	Robin Carpenter	Matej Mohorič	AG2R La Mondiale
Final		Matej Mohorič	Matej Mohorič	Robin Carpenter	Matej Mohorič	AG2R La Mondiale

== Final standings ==
Legend
General classification	Denotes the winner of the general classification	Points classification	Denotes the leader of the points classification
Mountains classification	Denotes the leader of the mountains classification	Young rider classification	Denotes the winner of the young rider classification

=== General classification ===
Final general classification (1–10)
Rank	Rider	Team	Time
1	Matej Mohorič (SLO)	Bahrain–Merida	17h 27' 10"
2	Nils Politt (GER)	Team Katusha–Alpecin	+ 6"
3	Maximilian Schachmann (GER)	Quick-Step Floors	+ 12"
4	Tom Dumoulin (NED)	Team Sunweb	+ 16"
5	Damiano Caruso (ITA)	BMC Racing Team	+ 26"
6	Warren Barguil (FRA)	Fortuneo–Samsic	+ 28"
7	Reinardt Janse van Rensburg (RSA)	Team Dimension Data	+ 30"
8	Romain Bardet (FRA)	AG2R La Mondiale	+ 31"
9	Guillaume Martin (FRA)	Wanty–Groupe Gobert	+ 33"
10	Nick van der Lijke (NED)	Roompot–Nederlandse Loterij	+ 34"

=== Points classification ===
Final points classification (1–10)
Rank	Rider	Team	Points
1	Matej Mohorič (SLO)	Bahrain–Merida	41
2	Nils Politt (GER)	Team Katusha–Alpecin	34
3	Reinardt Janse van Rensburg (RSA)	Team Dimension Data	21
4	Maximilian Schachmann (GER)	Quick-Step Floors	20
5	Álvaro José Hodeg (COL)	Quick-Step Floors	15
6	Pieter Vanspeybrouck (BEL)	Wanty–Groupe Gobert	14
7	Nick van der Lijke (NED)	Roompot–Nederlandse Loterij	13
8	Rick Zabel (GER)	Team Katusha–Alpecin	12
9	Damiano Caruso (ITA)	BMC Racing Team	12
10	Pascal Ackermann (GER)	Bora–Hansgrohe	12

=== Mountains classification ===
Final mountains classification (1–10)
Rank	Rider	Team	Points
1	Robin Carpenter (USA)	Rally Cycling	15
2	Gaëtan Pons (LUX)	Leopard Pro Cycling	6
3	Rémi Cavagna (FRA)	Quick-Step Floors	5
4	Vasil Kiryienka (BLR)	Team Sky	5
5	Adam Hansen (AUS)	Lotto–Soudal	5
6	Juri Hollmann (GER)	Heizomat–rad-net.de	4
7	Matej Mohorič (SLO)	Bahrain–Merida	3
8	Tom Dumoulin (NED)	Team Sunweb	3
9	Nathan Earle (AUS)	Israel Cycling Academy	3
10	Kevin Van Melsen (BEL)	Wanty–Groupe Gobert	3

=== Young rider classification ===
Final young rider classification (1–10)
Rank	Rider	Team	Time
1	Matej Mohorič (SLO)	Bahrain–Merida	17h 27' 10"
2	Nils Politt (GER)	Team Katusha–Alpecin	+ 6"
3	Maximilian Schachmann (GER)	Quick-Step Floors	+ 12"
4	Guillaume Martin (FRA)	Wanty–Groupe Gobert	+ 33"
5	Sebastián Henao (COL)	Team Sky	+ 34"
6	Szymon Rekita (POL)	Leopard Pro Cycling	+ 1' 21"
7	Kilian Frankiny (SUI)	BMC Racing Team	+ 1' 21"
8	Lennard Kämna (GER)	Team Sunweb	+ 1' 21"
9	Odd Christian Eiking (NOR)	Wanty–Groupe Gobert	+ 3' 04"
10	Jérémy Maison (FRA)	Fortuneo–Samsic	+ 3' 13"

=== Team classification ===
Final team classification (1–10)
Rank	Team	Time
1	AG2R La Mondiale	52h 23' 12"
2	Wanty–Groupe Gobert	+ 1' 16"
3	Movistar Team	+ 1' 34"
4	BMC Racing Team	+ 2' 02"
5	Israel Cycling Academy	+ 3' 40"
6	Team Sky	+ 6' 59"
7	Roompot–Nederlandse Loterij	+ 10' 23"
8	Team Katusha–Alpecin	+ 12' 17"
9	Bora–Hansgrohe	+ 15' 06"
10	Team Dimension Data	+ 16' 57"
