= Levens, Alpes-Maritimes =

Commune in Provence-Alpes-Côte d'Azur, France

Levens
- Commune
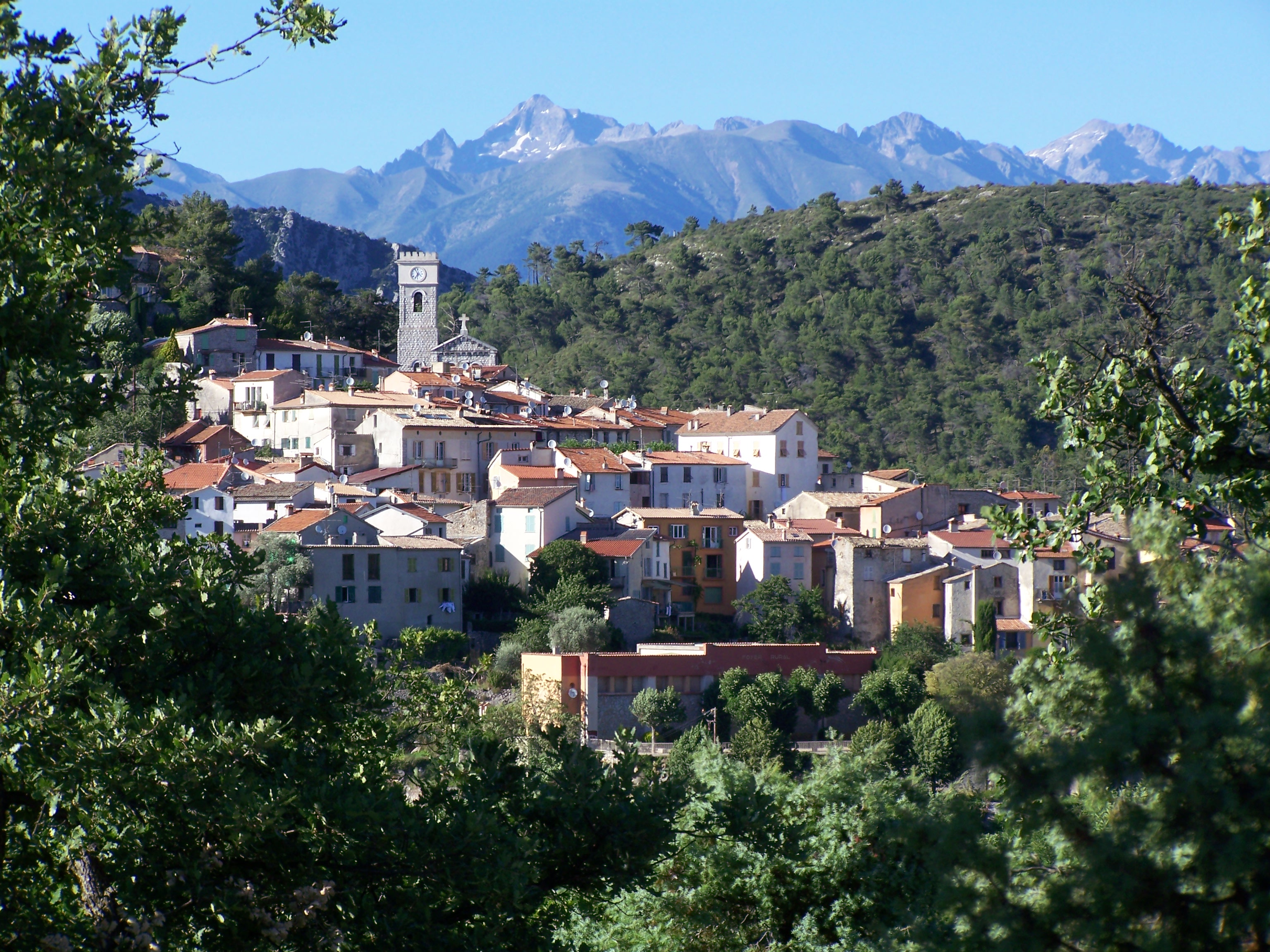
- The village of Levens, seen from the west with the Cime du Gélas in the background

- Coat of arms
- Location of Levens
- Location within France Location within Provence-Alpes-Côte d'Azur
- Coordinates: 43°51′42″N 7°13′31″E
- Country: France
- Region: Provence-Alpes-Côte d'Azur
- Department: Alpes-Maritimes
- Arrondissement: Nice
- Canton: Tourrette-Levens
- Intercommunality: Métropole Nice Côte d'Azur

Government
  - Mayor (2026–32): Antoine Véran
- Area^{1}: 29.85 km^{2} (11.53 sq mi)
- Elevation: 600 m (2,000 ft)
- Highest elevation: 1,414 m (4,639 ft)
- Lowest elevation: 121 m (397 ft)
- Population (2023): 5,377
  - Density: 180.1/km^{2} (466.5/sq mi)
- Time zone: UTC+01:00 (CET)
  - Summer (DST): UTC+02:00 (CEST)
- INSEE/Postal code: 06075 /06670
- ^{1} French Land Register data, which excludes lakes, ponds, glaciers > 1 km^{2} (0.386 sq mi or 247 acres) and river estuaries.

Levens (French pronunciation: [ləvɛ̃s]; Italian: Levenzo) is a commune in the Alpes-Maritimes département in Provence-Alpes-Côte d'Azur, a region in southeastern France.

Its inhabitants are called Levensans (or Levensois).

== Name ==
There are three possible explanations of the origin of the name:

- From the name of the Leponti tribe, which was changed to Leventi during the Roman period;
- From the name of a notable Roman figure, Laevinus;
- From the Ligurian word stem lev, indicating a sloping landscape;

== Geography ==
The village, built on high rocky ground, is located at an altitude of 600 metres. It lies in the centre of the district, which stretches from the plain of the Var (Plan-du-Var hamlet) to the Férion range. Mount Férion is 1,400 metres high.

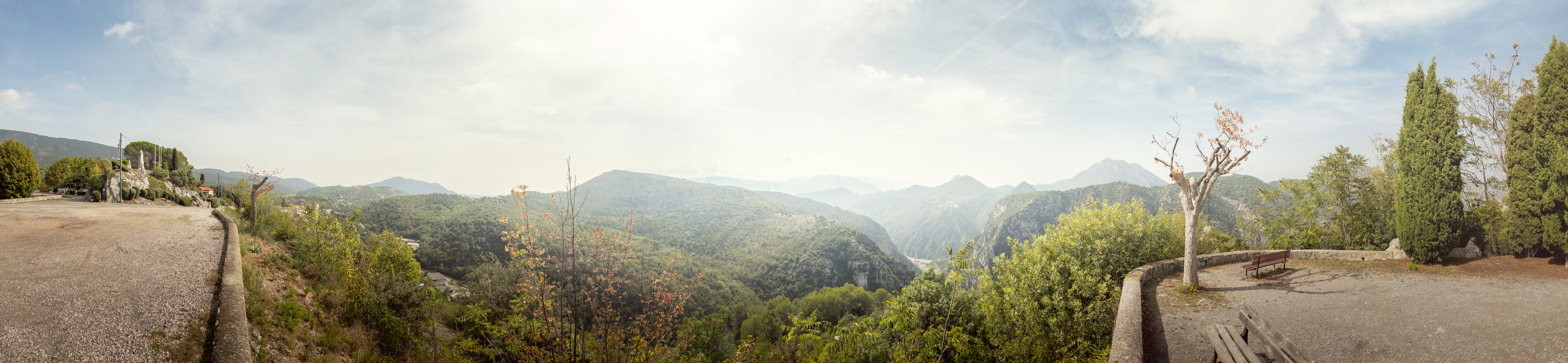
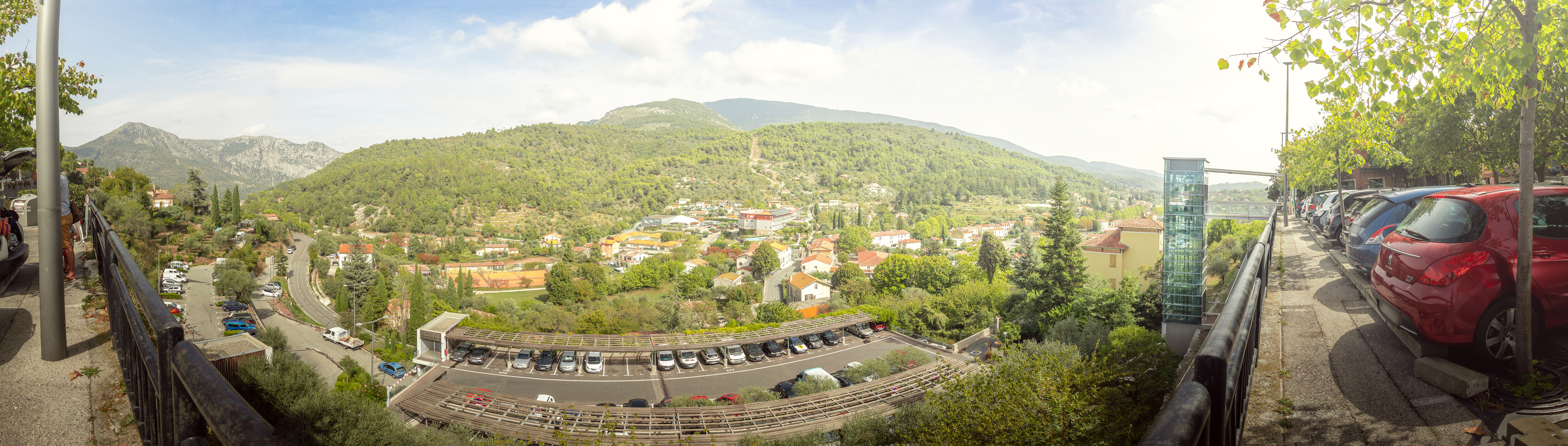

== Gallery ==
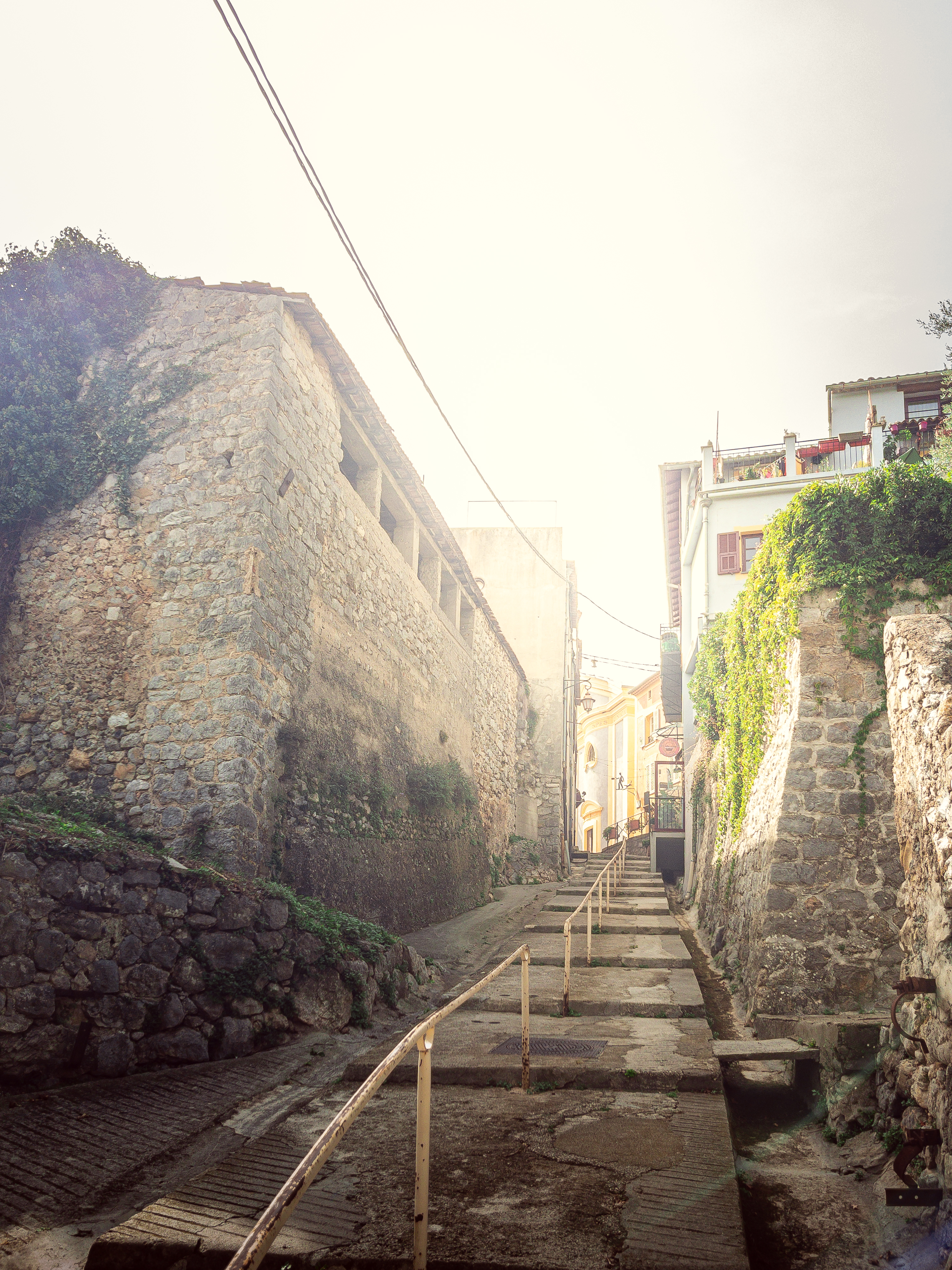

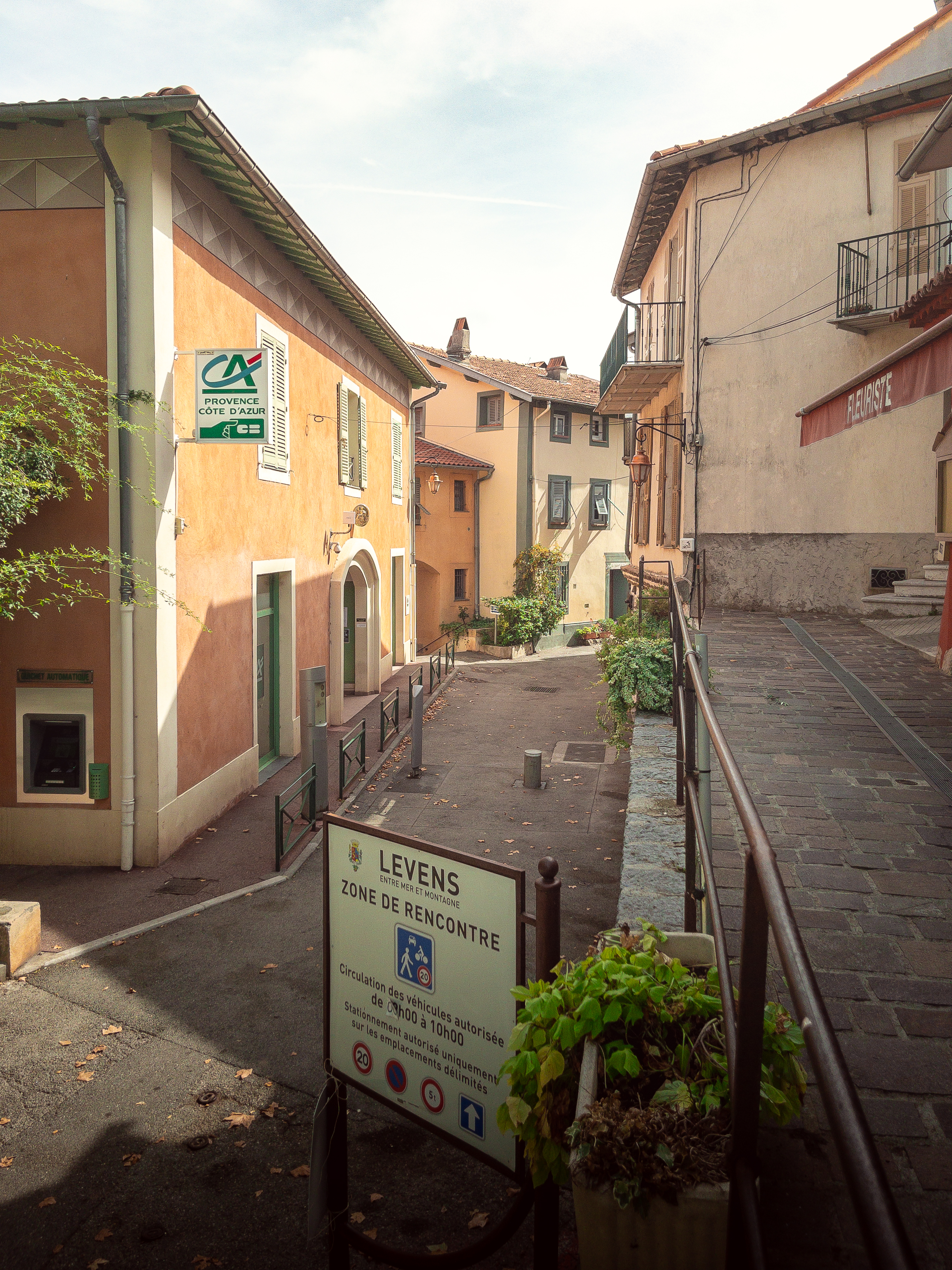

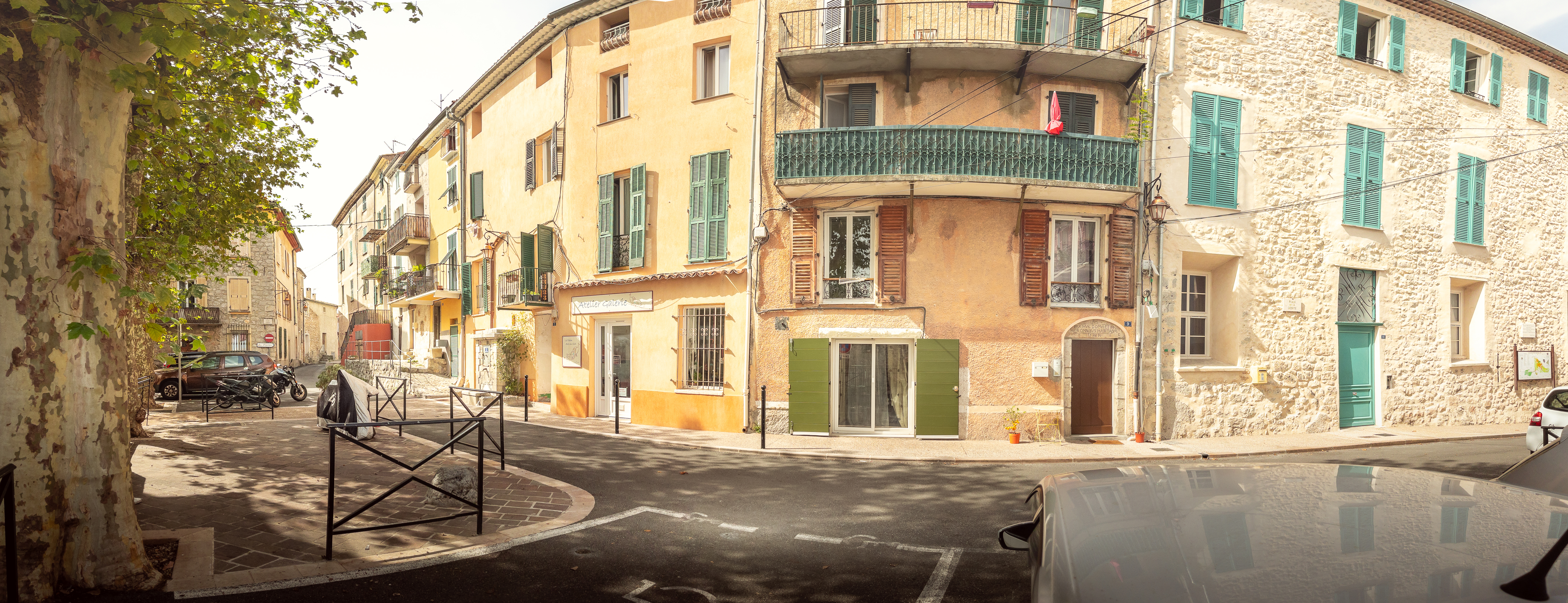

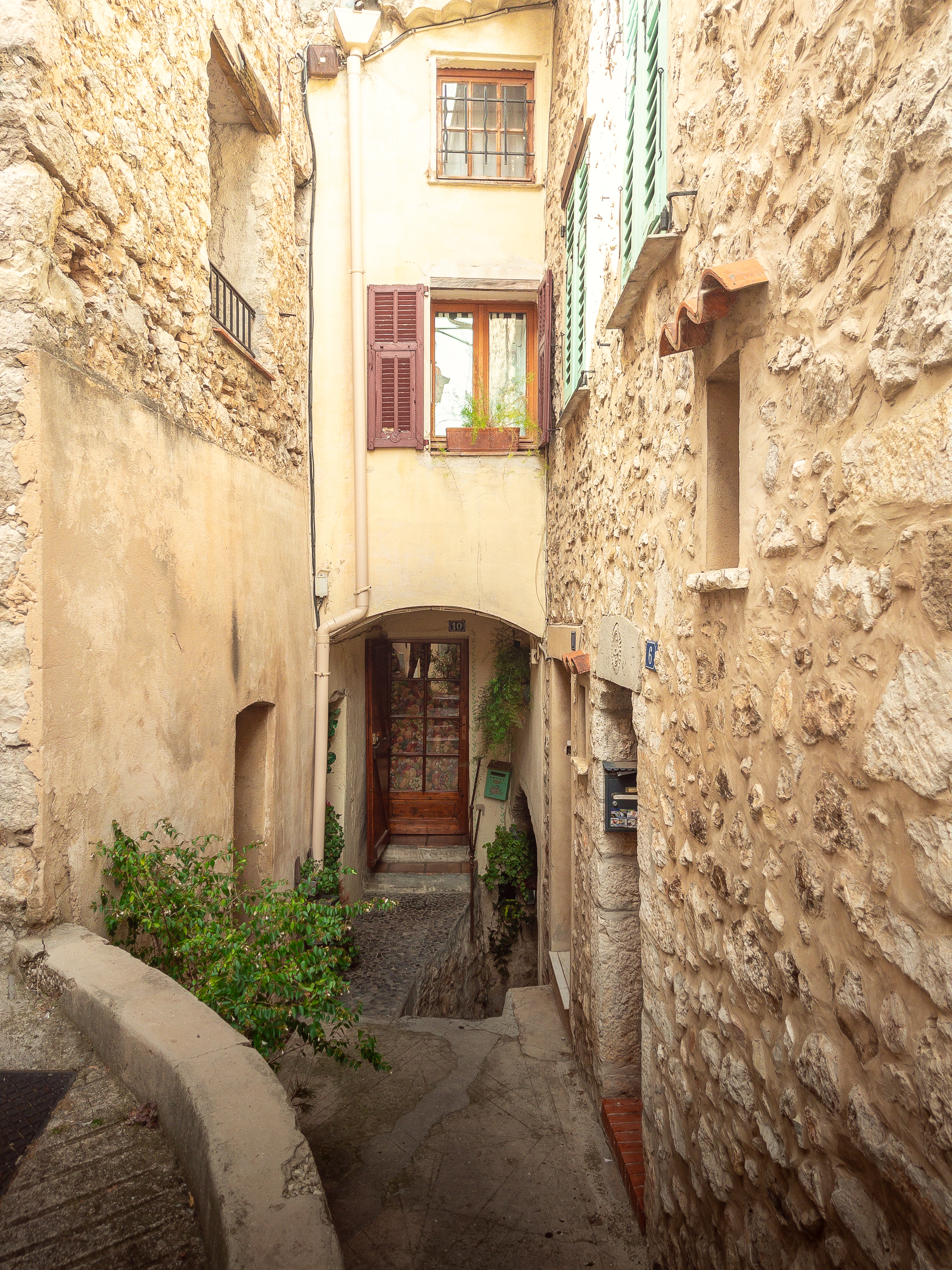

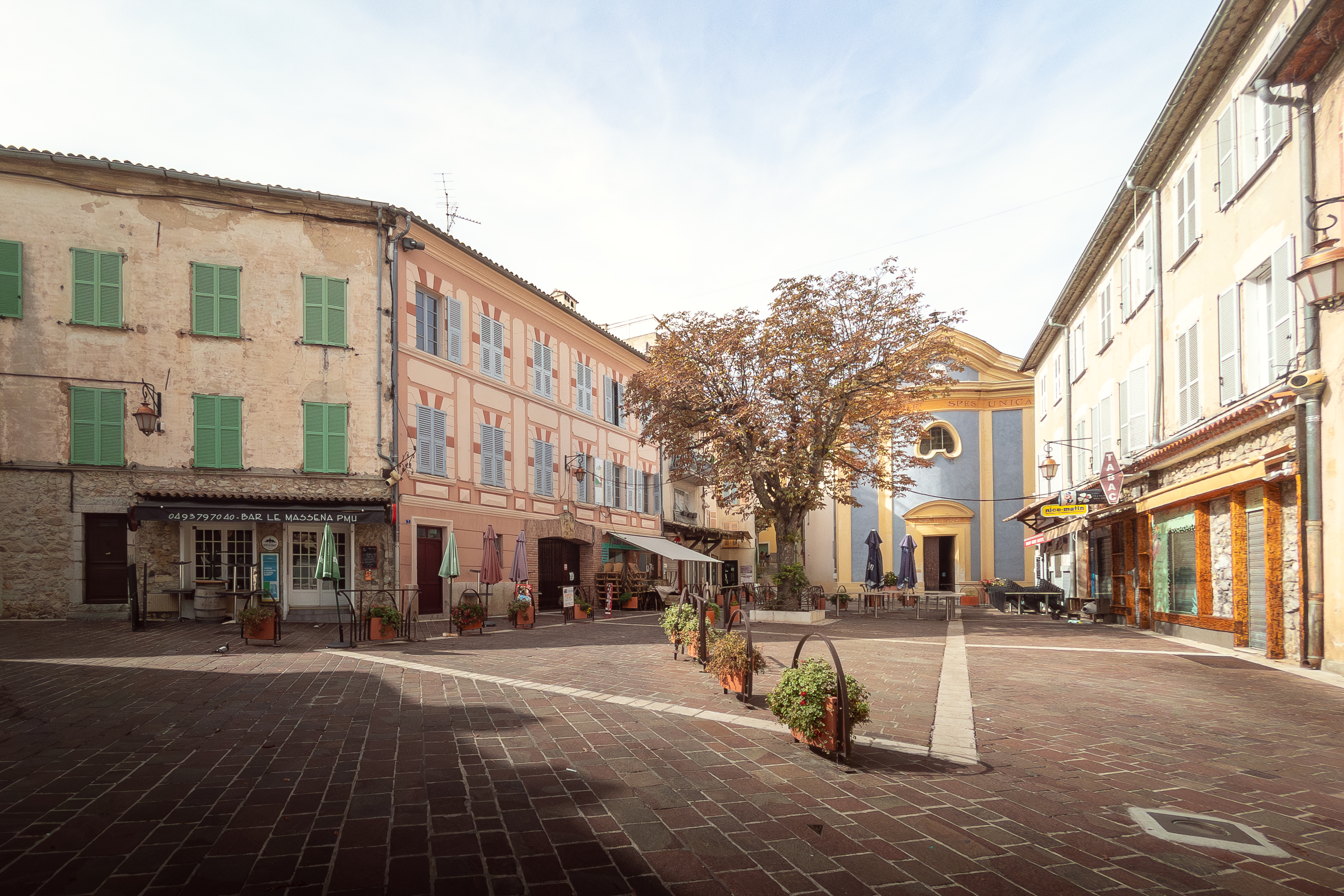

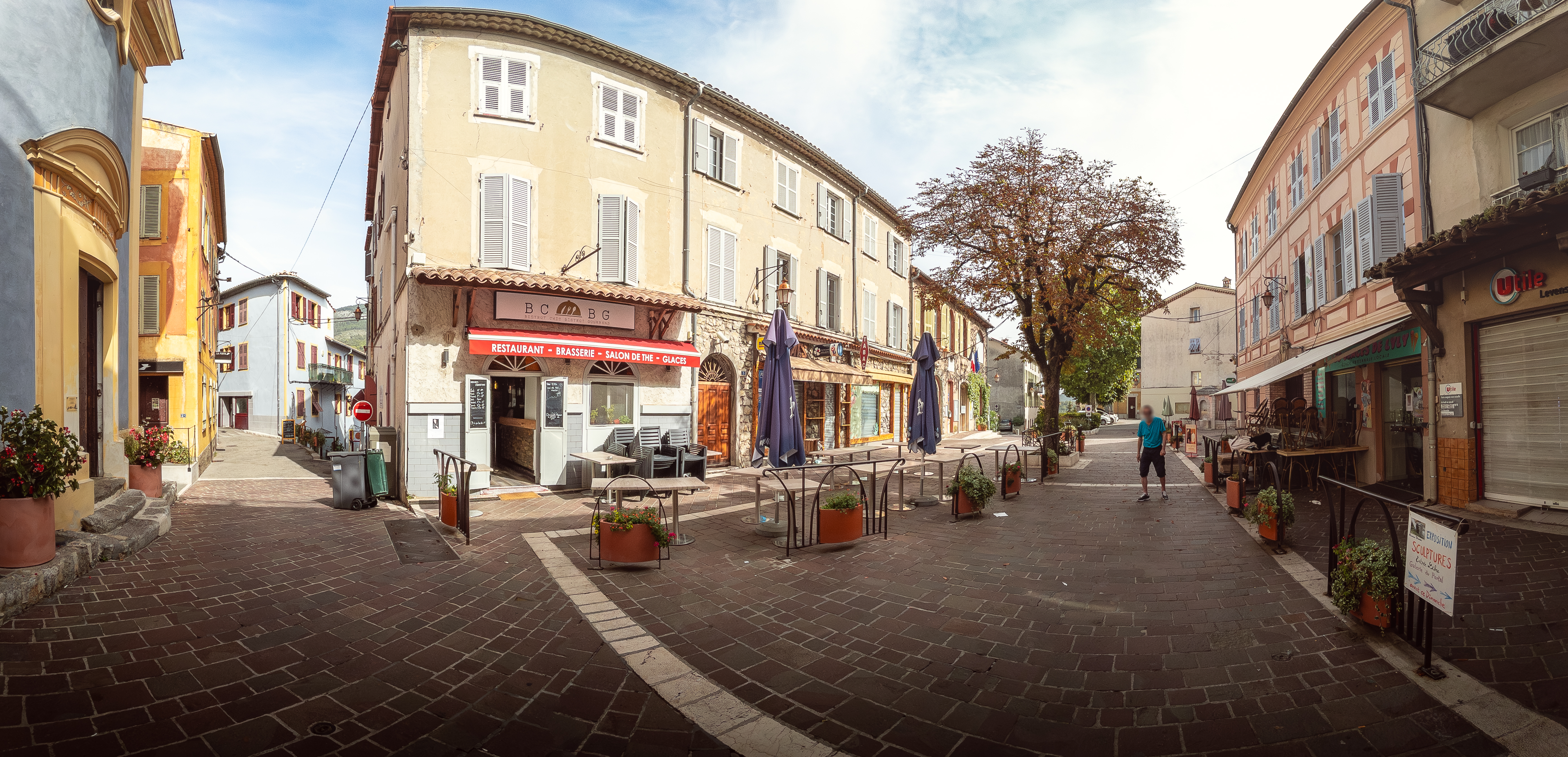

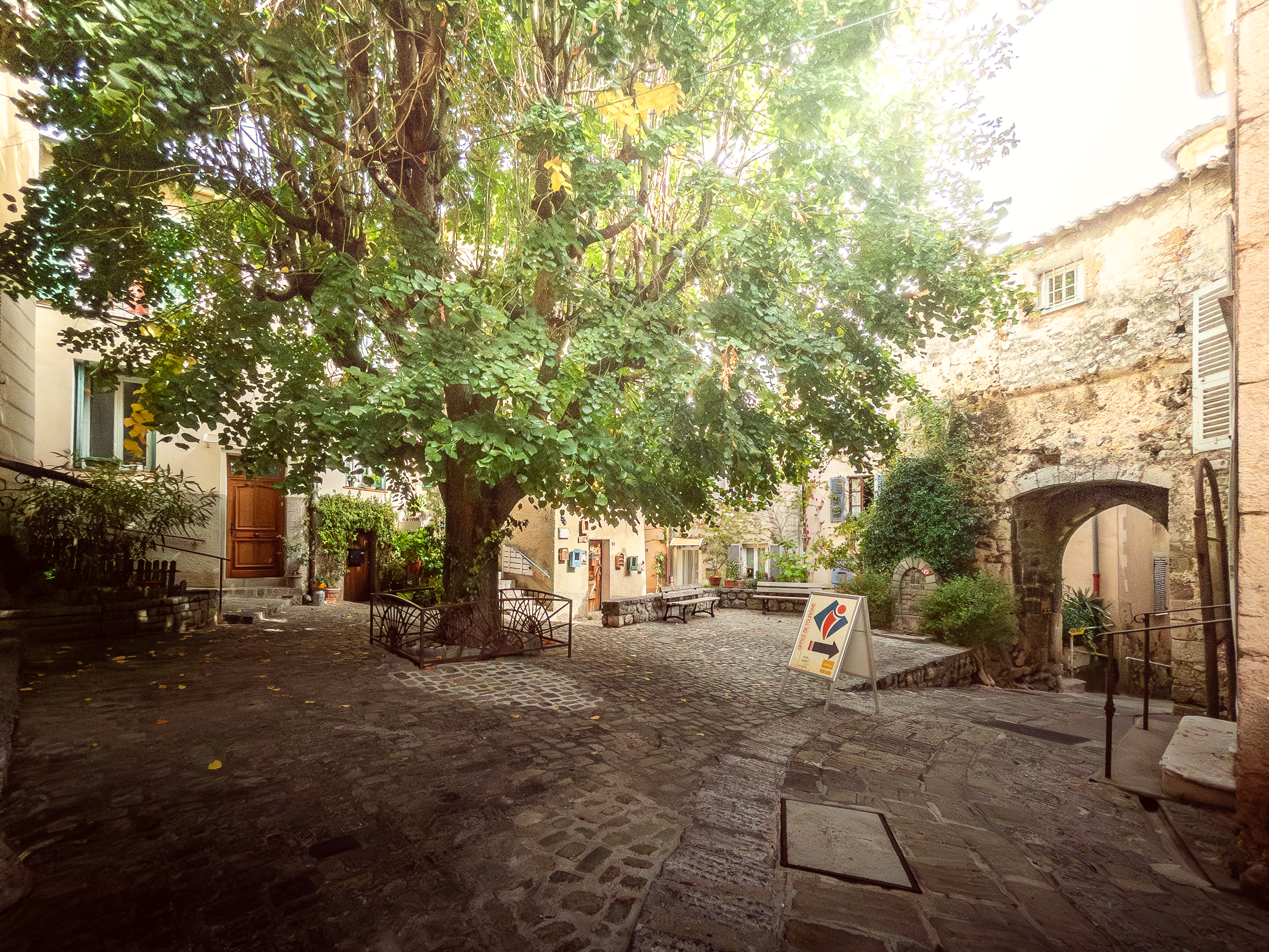

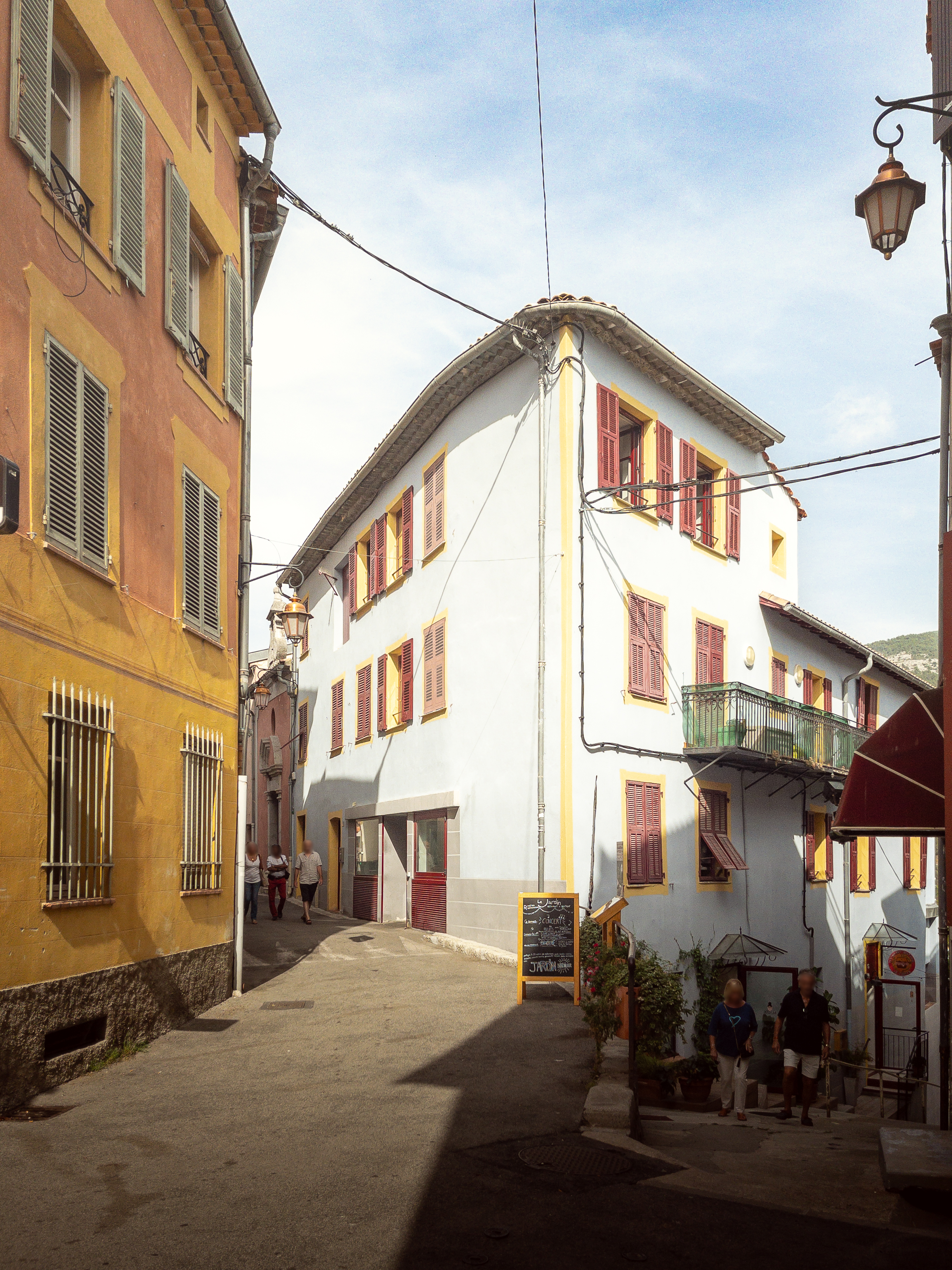

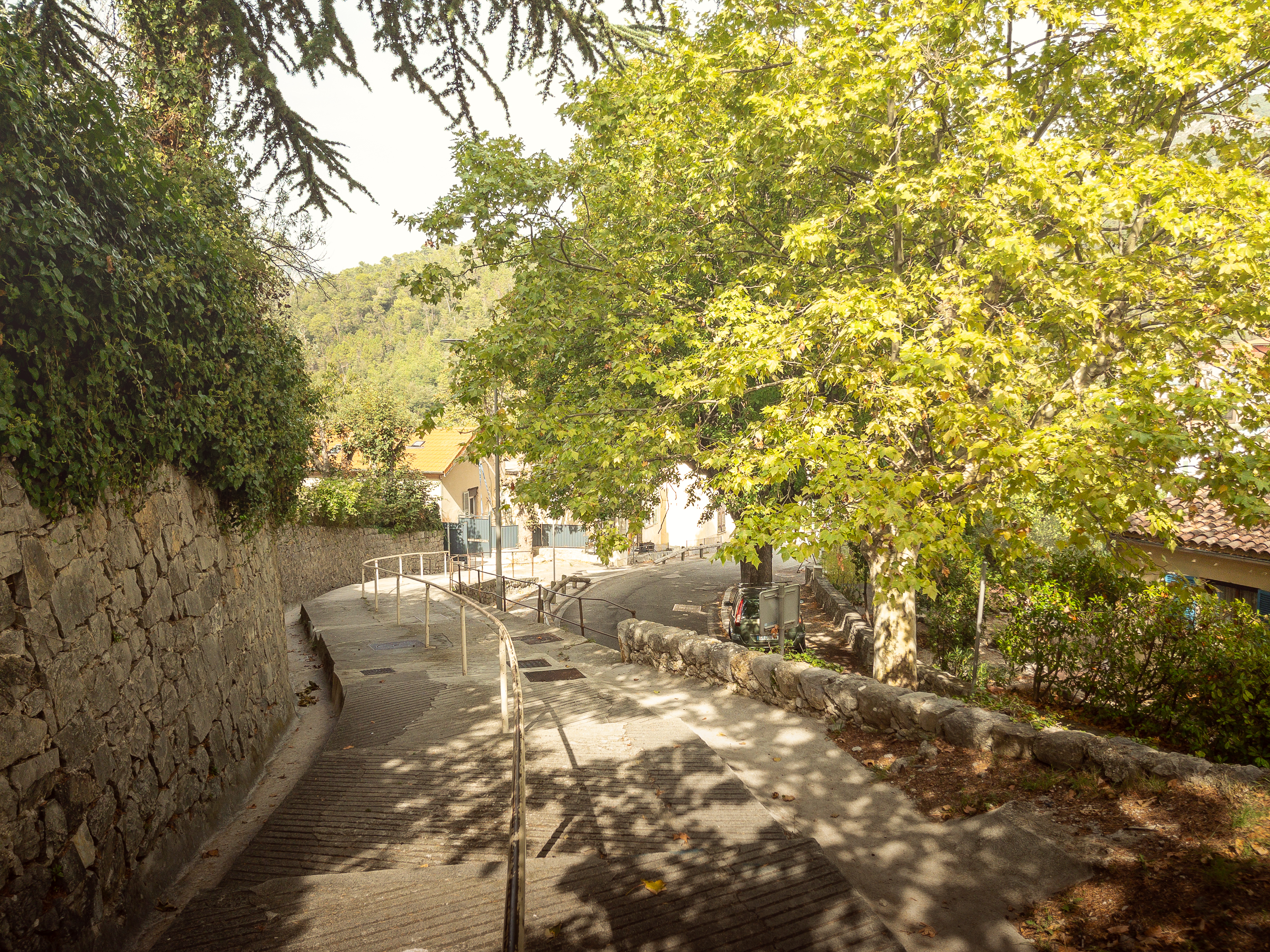

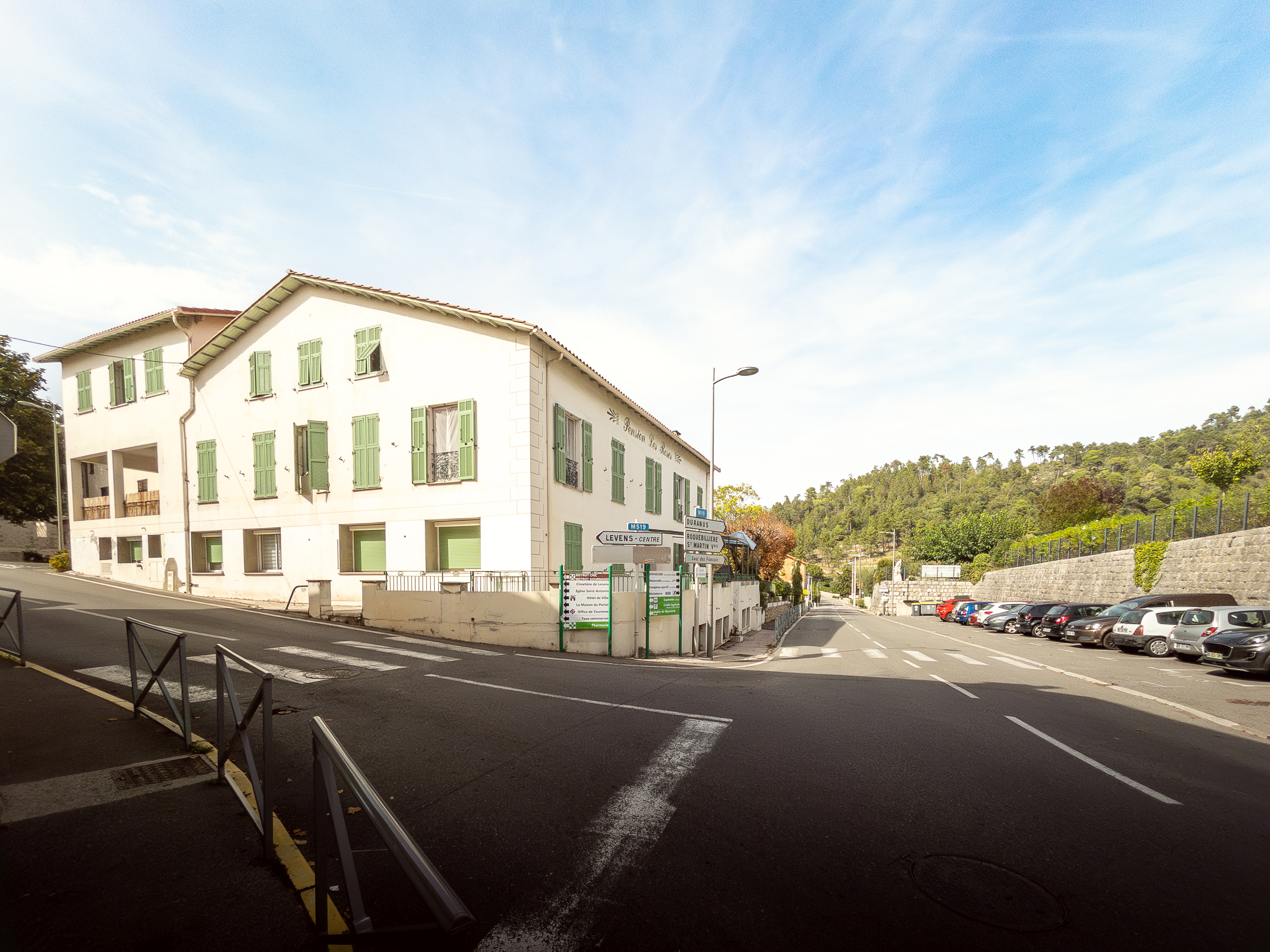

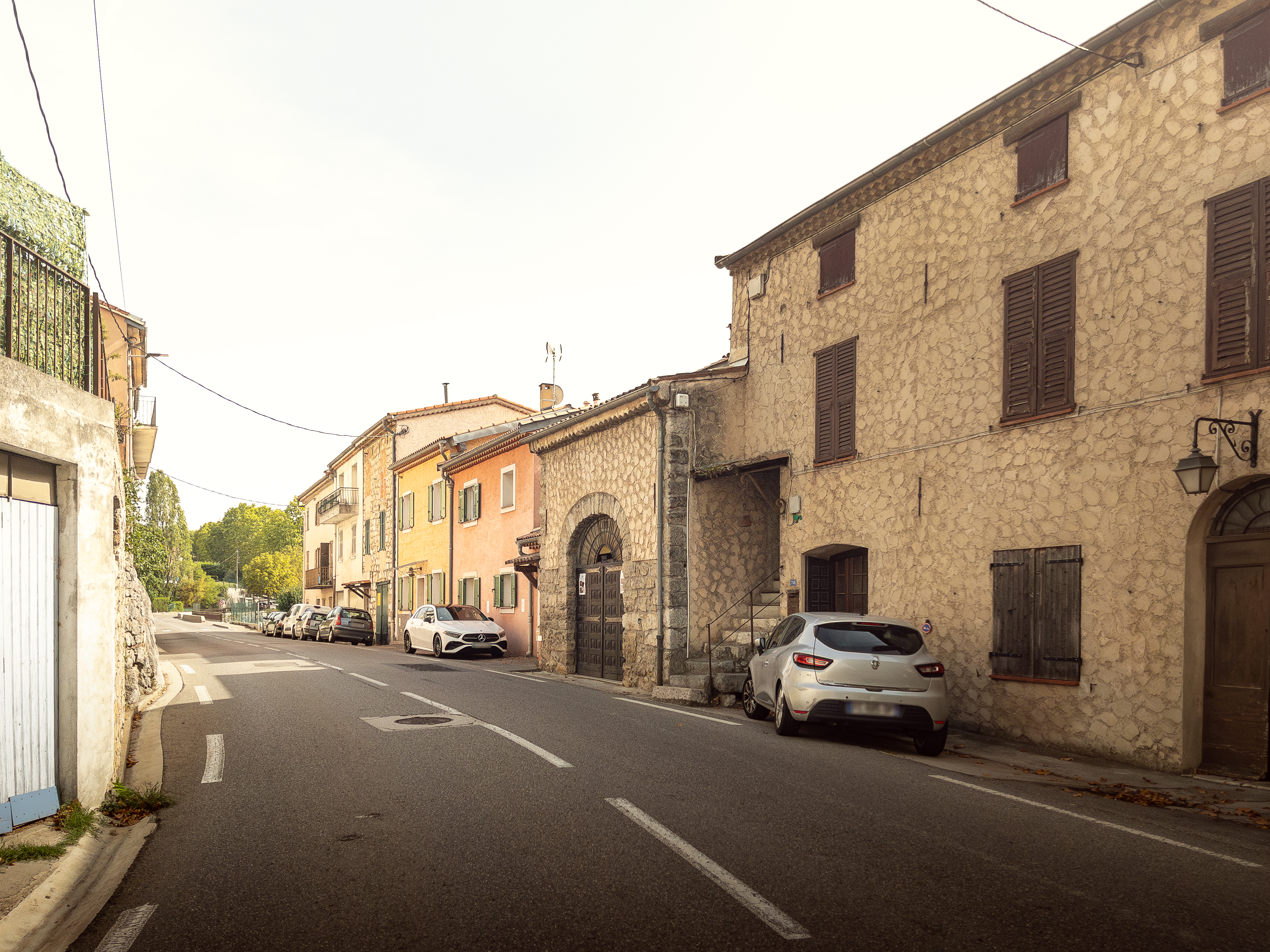

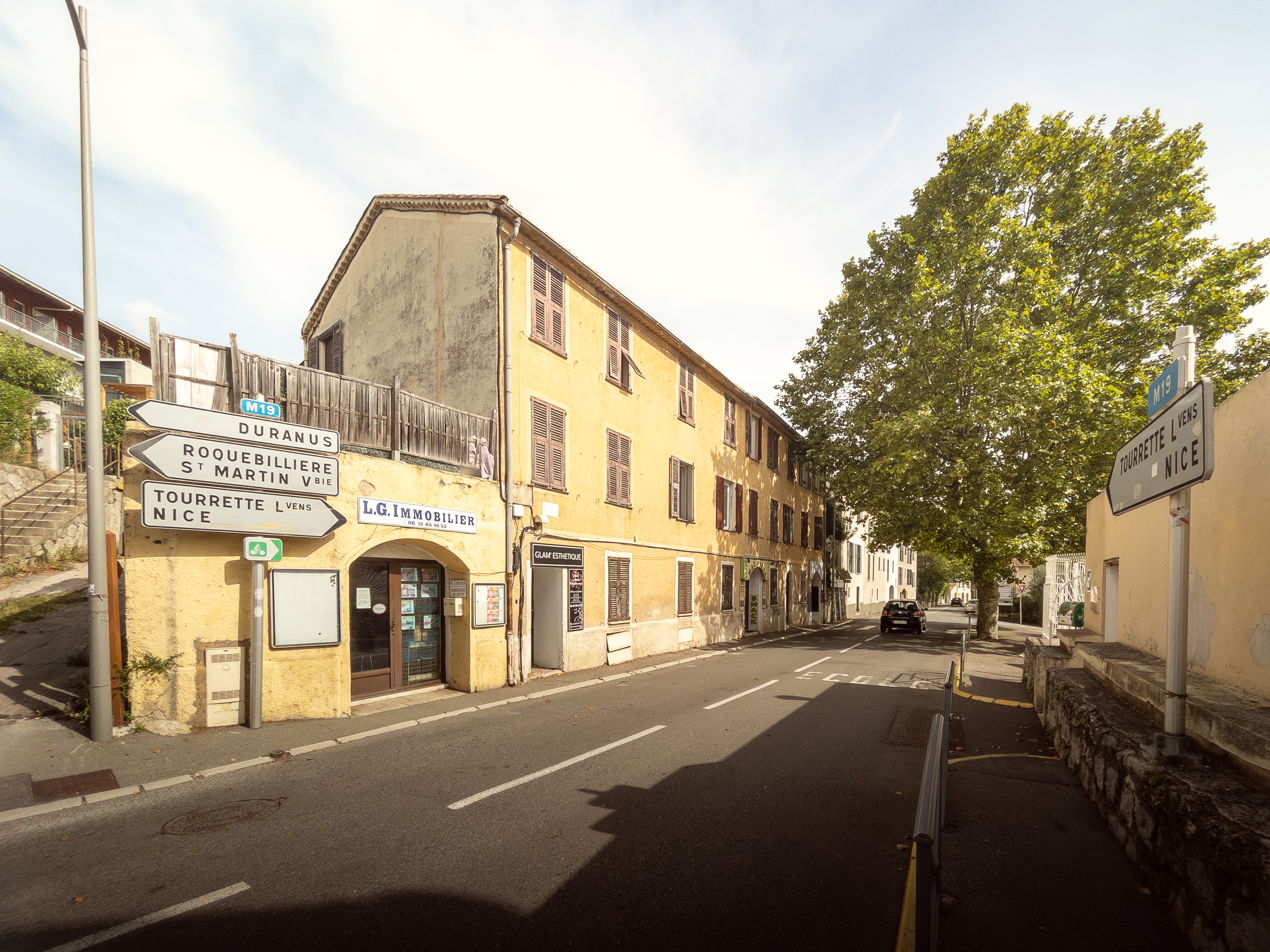

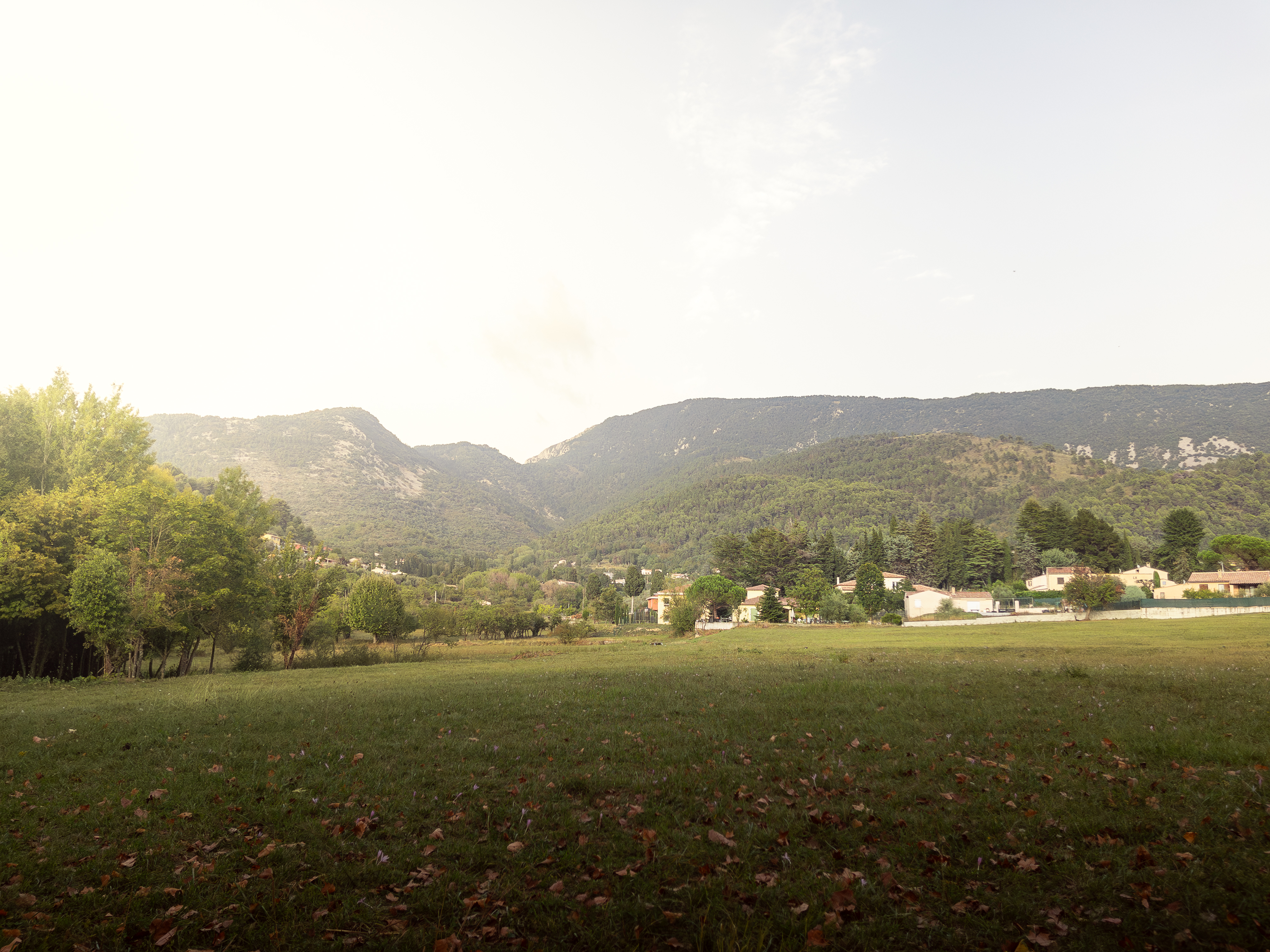

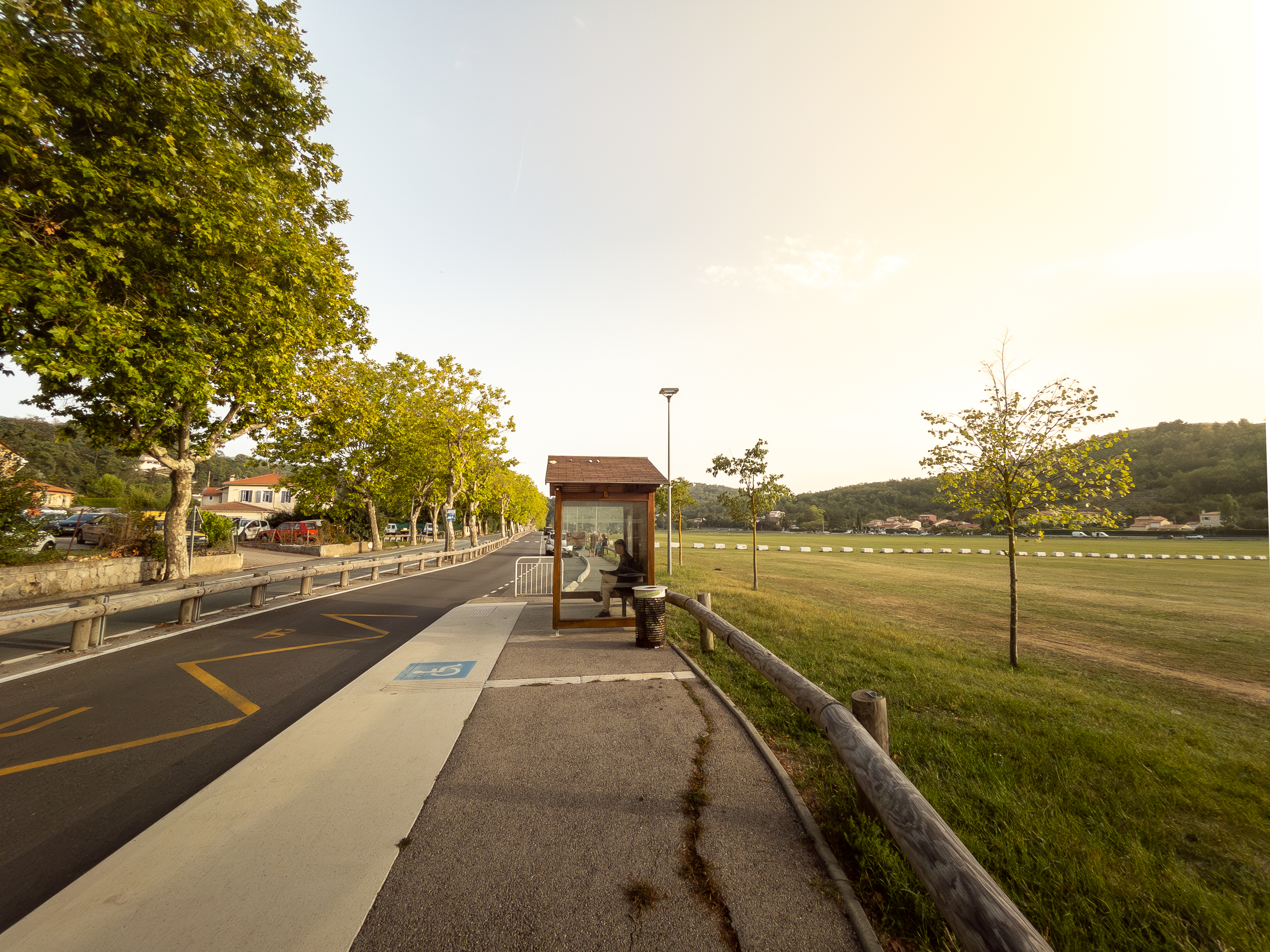

== Climate ==
On average, Levens experiences 22.3 days per year with a minimum temperature below 0 °C (32.0 °F), no days per year with a minimum temperature below −10 °C (14.0 °F), 0.5 days per year with a maximum temperature below 0 °C (32.0 °F), and 5.5 days per year with a maximum temperature above 30 °C (86.0 °F). The record high temperature was 35.1 °C (95.2 °F) on 28 June 2019, while the record low temperature was −7.8 °C (18.0 °F) on 6 February 2012.

Climate data for Levens (1991–2020 normals, extremes 2008–present)
Month	Jan	Feb	Mar	Apr	May	Jun	Jul	Aug	Sep	Oct	Nov	Dec	Year
Record high °C (°F)	18.8 (65.8)	18.6 (65.5)	22.2 (72.0)	25.2 (77.4)	29.7 (85.5)	35.1 (95.2)	33.4 (92.1)	34.0 (93.2)	30.9 (87.6)	26.2 (79.2)	23.3 (73.9)	20.2 (68.4)	35.1 (95.2)
Mean daily maximum °C (°F)	9.1 (48.4)	9.5 (49.1)	12.5 (54.5)	15.7 (60.3)	18.8 (65.8)	23.2 (73.8)	26.3 (79.3)	26.8 (80.2)	22.7 (72.9)	17.9 (64.2)	12.9 (55.2)	9.9 (49.8)	17.1 (62.8)
Daily mean °C (°F)	5.5 (41.9)	5.6 (42.1)	8.4 (47.1)	11.5 (52.7)	14.5 (58.1)	18.7 (65.7)	21.5 (70.7)	21.8 (71.2)	18.0 (64.4)	13.9 (57.0)	9.3 (48.7)	6.3 (43.3)	12.9 (55.2)
Mean daily minimum °C (°F)	1.8 (35.2)	1.7 (35.1)	4.3 (39.7)	7.3 (45.1)	10.2 (50.4)	14.2 (57.6)	16.7 (62.1)	16.9 (62.4)	13.4 (56.1)	10.0 (50.0)	5.7 (42.3)	2.6 (36.7)	8.7 (47.7)
Record low °C (°F)	−4.5 (23.9)	−7.8 (18.0)	−3.9 (25.0)	−1.2 (29.8)	2.5 (36.5)	6.7 (44.1)	9.9 (49.8)	10.1 (50.2)	4.5 (40.1)	0.3 (32.5)	−3.7 (25.3)	−6.9 (19.6)	−7.8 (18.0)
Average precipitation mm (inches)	69.4 (2.73)	82.7 (3.26)	98.6 (3.88)	96.7 (3.81)	69.5 (2.74)	53.6 (2.11)	23.5 (0.93)	19.5 (0.77)	49.9 (1.96)	123.7 (4.87)	174.1 (6.85)	120.9 (4.76)	982.1 (38.67)
Average precipitation days (≥ 1.0 mm)	5.2	6.8	6.3	7.3	6.8	6.4	3.1	2.6	4.7	6.3	9.2	6.5	71.2
Source: Meteociel

== Population ==
Historical population
Year	Pop.	±% p.a.
1968	1,299	—
1975	1,422	+1.30%
1982	1,800	+3.42%
1990	2,686	+5.13%
1999	3,700	+3.62%
2007	4,503	+2.49%
2012	4,761	+1.12%
2017	4,738	−0.10%
2023	5,377	+2.13%
Source: INSEE

== Mayors ==
List of mayors since 1860
Period	Identity	Party	Quality
1994	Antoine Véran
1991–1994	Léon-Pierre Raybaud
1929–1991	Joseph Raybaud		Senator of the Alpes-Maritimes
1903–1929	Jean Giletta
1896–1903	Léon Sauvan
1882–1896	Joseph Faraut
1878–1882	Louis Ciais
1871–1878	Victor Masséglia
1870–1871	Joseph Faraut
1865–1870	Louis Barriéra
1860–1865	Honoré Baudouin
Before the 1860 incorporation of County of Nice into France, Levens and the County of Nice were part of the Piedmont-Sardinia kingdom.

== Tourism ==
Levens is one of sixteen villages grouped together by the Métropole Nice Côte d'Azur tourist department as the Route des Villages Perchés (Route of Perched Villages). The others are: Aspremont, Carros, Castagniers, Coaraze, Colomars, Duranus, Èze, Falicon, La Gaude, Lantosque, La Roquette-sur-Var, Saint-Blaise, Saint-Jeannet, Tourrette-Levens and Utelle.

== See also ==
- Communes of the Alpes-Maritimes department
