= Le Broc, Alpes-Maritimes =

Commune in Provence-Alpes-Côte d'Azur, France

Le Broc
- Commune
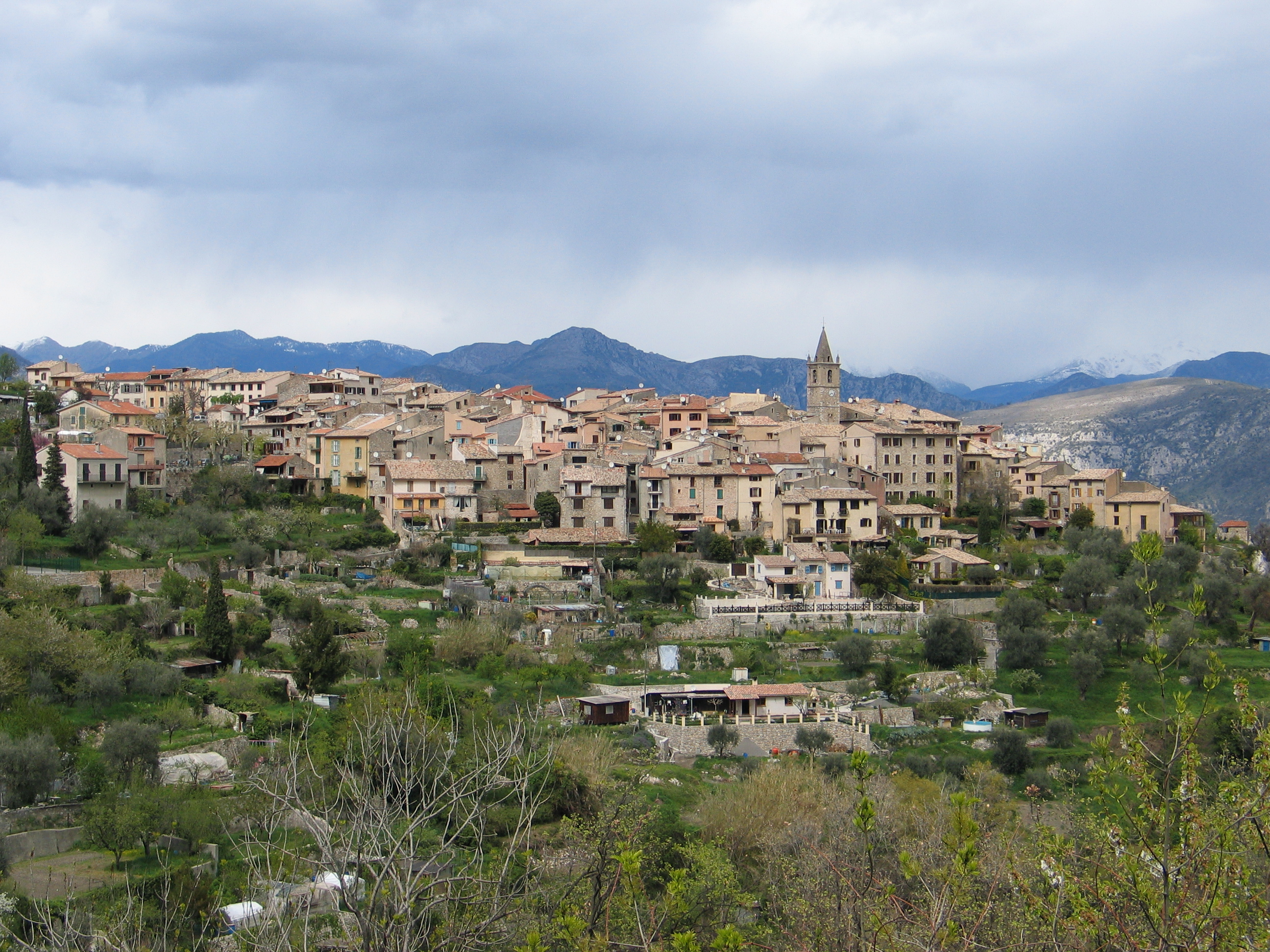
- A general view of Le Broc

- Coat of arms
- Location of Le Broc
- Location within France Location within Provence-Alpes-Côte d'Azur
- Coordinates: 43°48′37″N 7°10′14″E
- Country: France
- Region: Provence-Alpes-Côte d'Azur
- Department: Alpes-Maritimes
- Arrondissement: Grasse
- Canton: Nice-3
- Intercommunality: Métropole Nice Côte d'Azur

Government
  - Mayor (2026–32): Philippe Heura
- Area^{1}: 18.65 km^{2} (7.20 sq mi)
- Elevation: 450 m (1,480 ft)
- Highest elevation: 1,024 m (3,360 ft)
- Lowest elevation: 91 m (299 ft)
- Population (2023): 1,446
  - Density: 77.53/km^{2} (200.8/sq mi)
- Time zone: UTC+01:00 (CET)
  - Summer (DST): UTC+02:00 (CEST)
- INSEE/Postal code: 06025 /06510
- ^{1} French Land Register data, which excludes lakes, ponds, glaciers > 1 km^{2} (0.386 sq mi or 247 acres) and river estuaries.

Le Broc (French pronunciation: [lə bʁɔk]; Occitan: Lo Bròc) is a commune in the Alpes-Maritimes department in south-eastern France. Le Broc is 14 kilometres from Nice, the nearest city, 10 kilometres from the nearest town of Vence and is 672 kilometres from the capital of France, Paris.

== Population ==
Historical population
Year	Pop.	±% p.a.
1968	339	—
1975	360	+0.86%
1982	422	+2.30%
1990	671	+5.97%
1999	1,023	+4.80%
2007	1,269	+2.73%
2012	1,376	+1.63%
2017	1,413	+0.53%
2023	1,446	+0.39%
Source: INSEE

== Fishing ==
Le Broc lies on the river Var and the lake of Broc (Lac du Broc). Fishing is a popular activity in this man made lake however a license is required. A fishing license can be obtained in most of the tourist offices and local fishing clubs or shops. The main species of fish that live in the lake consist of: bleak, roach, perch, and mirror carp.

== Climate ==
During the summer, the temperature can go up to 30 °C (80 °F), but in the winter, temperatures can drop as low as 10 °C (50 °F). Le Broc has a similar climate to many other parts of Southern France despite its increased elevation.

== See also ==
- Communes of the Alpes-Maritimes department
- Communes of France
