= Urban community of Nice Côte d'Azur =

Coordinates: 43.715°N 7.246°E

Nice Côte d'Azur
- Former communauté urbaine
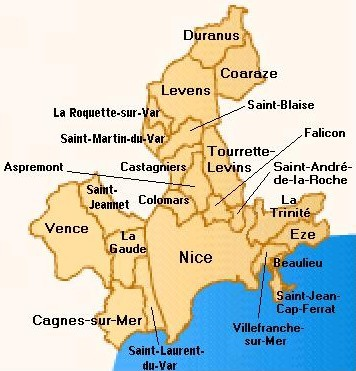
- Country: France
- Region: Provence-Alpes-Côte d'Azur
- Department: Alpes-Maritimes
- No. of communes: {{{nbcomm}}}
- Established: 2008
- Disbanded: 2012
- Area: 351 km^{2} (136 sq mi)
- Population (2008): 535,543
  - Density: 1,530/km^{2} (3,950/sq mi)

The Urban community of Nice Côte d'Azur (French: communauté urbaine Nice Côte d'Azur), is the former intercommunal structure gathering the city of Nice (France) and some of its suburbs. It was created in December 2008.

The Urban community of Nice Côte d'Azur encompassed essentially the eastern part of the metropolitan area of Nice (see infobox at Nice article for the metropolitan area), the western communes of the metropolitan area around Cannes and Antibes having refused to join in.

Those parts of the metropolitan area that were not inside the Community have formed different intercommunal structures, such as:

- Communauté d'agglomération de Sophia Antipolis, with Antibes and Valbonne in it
- Communauté d'agglomération du Moyen Pays Provençal
- Communauté de communes du Pays des Paillons
- etc.

On 1 January 2012, the urban community and three communities of communes merged becoming the Metropolis Nice Côte d'Azur.

== Communes ==
The Communauté urbaine comprised the following communes:

1. Aspremont
2. Beaulieu-sur-Mer
3. Cagnes-sur-Mer
4. Cap-d'Ail
5. Carros
6. Castagniers
7. Coaraze
8. Colomars
9. Duranus
10. Èze
11. Falicon
12. La Gaude
13. Lantosque
14. Levens
15. Nice
16. La Roquette-sur-Var
17. Saint-André-de-la-Roche
18. Saint-Blaise
19. Saint-Jean-Cap-Ferrat
20. Saint-Jeannet
21. Saint-Laurent-du-Var
22. Saint-Martin-du-Var
23. Tourrette-Levens
24. La Trinité
25. Utelle
26. Vence
27. Villefranche-sur-Mer
