= Canton of Cagnes-sur-Mer-2 =

Coordinates: 43.67°N 7.17°E

- Canton
- Situation of the canton of Cagnes-sur-Mer-2 in the department of Alpes-Maritimes
- Country: France
- Region: Provence-Alpes-Côte d'Azur
- Department: Alpes-Maritimes
- No. of communes: {{{nbcomm}}}
- Population (2023): 48,393
- INSEE code: 0606

The canton of Cagnes-sur-Mer-2 is an administrative division of the Alpes-Maritimes department, southeastern France. It was created at the French canton reorganisation which came into effect in March 2015. Its seat is in Cagnes-sur-Mer.

It consists of the following communes:

1. Cagnes-sur-Mer (partly)
2. La Gaude
3. Saint-Laurent-du-Var
