= Chevre d'or =

Hotel and restaurant in France

La Chèvre d'Or

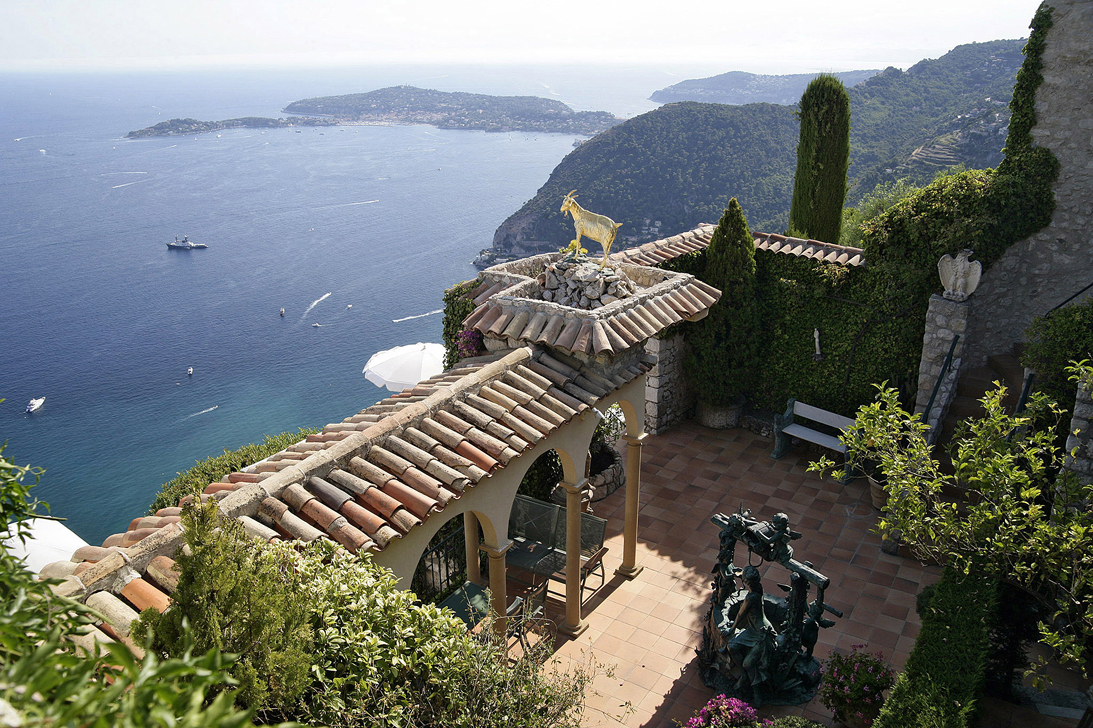
- Interactive map of the La Chèvre d'Or area

General information
- Location: Èze, France
- Coordinates: 43.727°N 7.362°E
- Management: Relais & Châteaux

Other information
- Number of rooms: 30
- Number of suites: 7

Website
- chevredor.com

La Chèvre d'Or is a Relais & Châteaux hotel located in the medieval city of Èze in the south of France, and is housed in a medieval castle rebuilt in the 1920s. The restaurant has two Michelin stars.

== History ==
First private property, it was called the Château de la Chèvre d'Or by one of its purchasers at the beginning of 20th century, the Yugoslav violinist Zlatko Baloković. It became a gourmet restaurant then a hotel in the 1950s. The hotelier Robert Wolf, impressed by the castle, bought it in 1953, and transformed it into a restaurant. The hotel received more attention after the arrival of Walt Disney. Then, Robert Wolf gradually acquired private houses and transformed them into individual hotel rooms. The hotel became one of the 6 stages of "La Route du Bonheur" founded in 1954 by Marcel Tilloy as part of the Relais & Châteaux chain.

The place is frequently visited by celebrities such as actors and directors, especially during the Cannes Film Festival.

In 2007, a scene in The Bucket List movie was shot at the hotel.

== Hotel ==
The hotel offers 40 rooms and suites, all of which have a different style. The suites are named after famous figures who stayed in the region, such as Friedrich Nietzsche and Jean Cocteau.

The castle has terraced gardens, medieval buildings, alleys, houses with exposed stones and a panoramic view of the Mediterranean Sea.

== Restaurant ==
The restaurant opened in 1953. It obtained its first Michelin star in 1975. Jean-Marc Delacourt became the chef in 1998, he brought a second Michelin star in 2000.

From 2003 to 2009, the kitchens were run by Philippe Labbé. In 2010, Fabrice Vulin took over the kitchens of the various restaurants of the Chèvre d'Or. Ronan Kervarrec, a time his second, succeeded him a few years later. Since July 2016, the restaurant has been run by Arnaud Faye.
