= Falicon pyramid =

Monument near Nice in France

Coordinates: 43.7499°N 7.2604°E

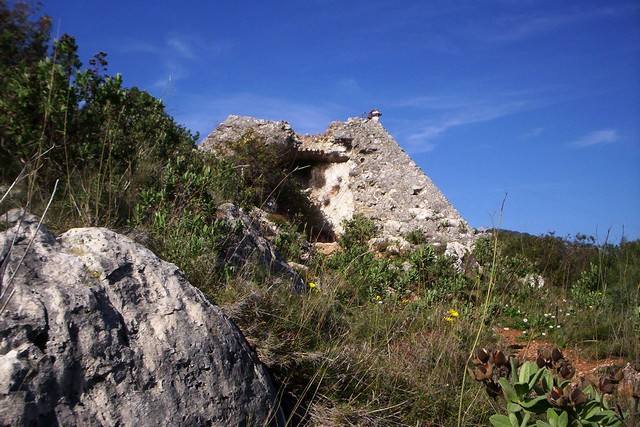
Falicon pyramid

The Falicon pyramid is a monument located at a rural site near the town of Falicon, on the French Riviera, near Nice.

It is constructed above a karstic cave known as the "Cave of the Bats" (Occitan: Bauma des Ratapignata) and is one of the few pyramids in Europe. The pyramid is constructed of small, irregularly shaped stones, possesses a fairly acute angle of inclination, and is in a partly ruined condition. While most of its upper section is missing, the lower section is reasonably well preserved.

The pyramid's purpose and exact origins are unknown. Though it had been suggested that it may have been constructed by Roman legionaries involved in Egyptian cult practices, more recent research indicated that it was actually built between 1803 and 1812, i.e. during the rule of Napoleon Bonaparte after the 1798–1801 French campaign in Egypt and Syria.
