= Castagniers Abbey =

Cistercian nunnery, known for chocolate production

Coordinates: 43°48′5″N 7°13′56″E

Castagniers Abbey (French: Abbaye Notre-Dame de la Paix de Castagniers) is a Cistercian nunnery, in Castagniers, 12 km from Nice in the Alpes-Maritimes departement in southwestern France.

In 1865, Dom Marie-Bernard Barnouin, restorer of Sénanque Abbey, founded a Cistercian community for women in Mane in the diocese of Digne, and in 1869, another in Reillanne, the Abbaye de Notre-Dame des Prés. In 1872 the two communities were united in Reillanne.

In 1930 the community left Reillanne to settle in Castagniers. The community was elevated to the rank of an abbey in 1962.

The first abbess, Mother Marguerite de la Trinité, saw to it that the place became a chocolate factory, which is still working today. The nuns have a guest house and they welcome guests wishing to make a retreat.

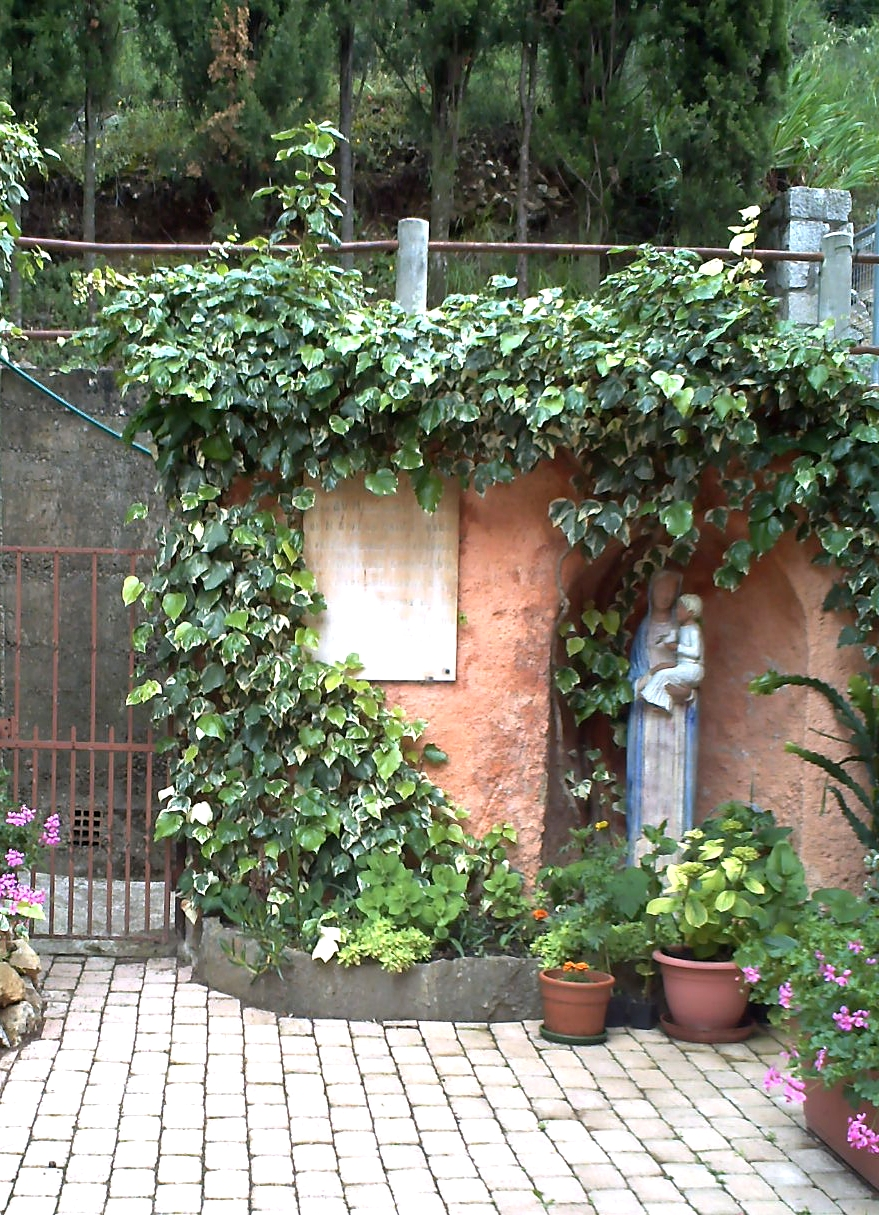
Our Lady of Peace (Notre Dame de la Paix)

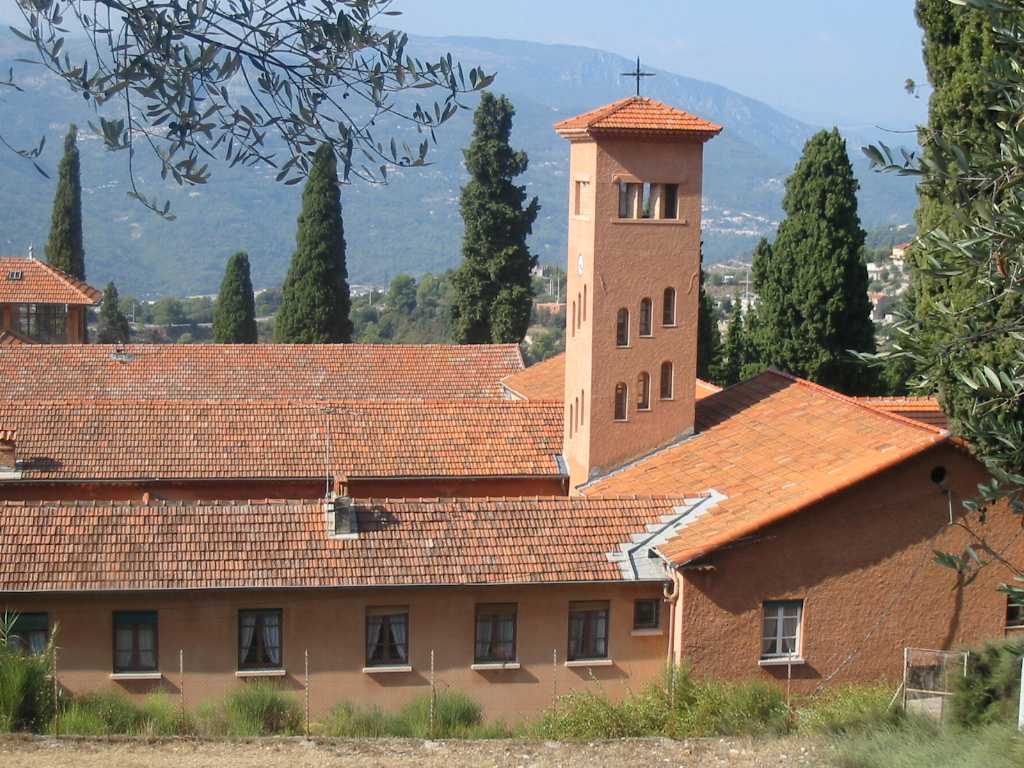
The Abbey

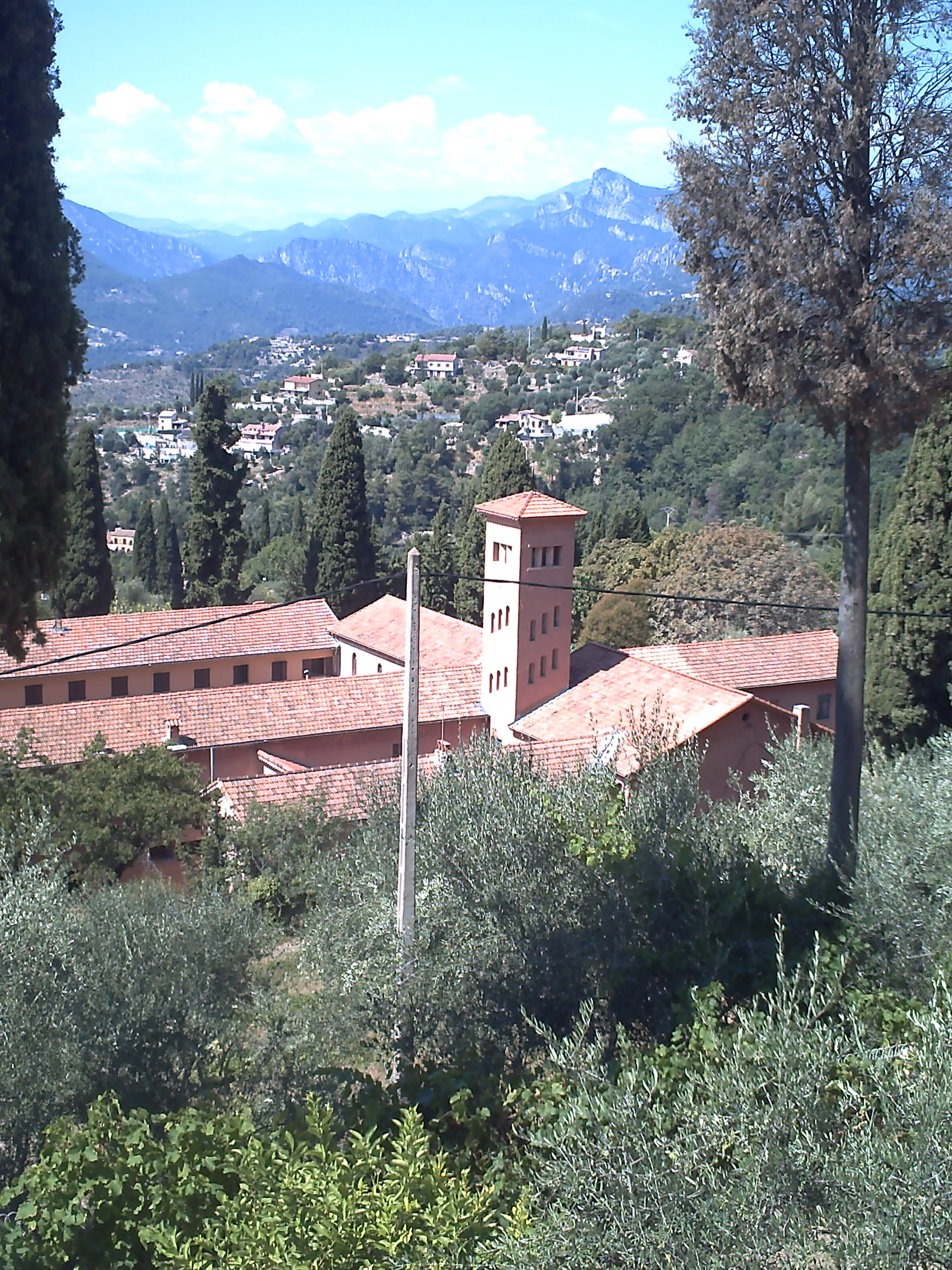
The bell tower
