= Utelle =

Commune in Provence-Alpes-Côte d'Azur, France

- Commune
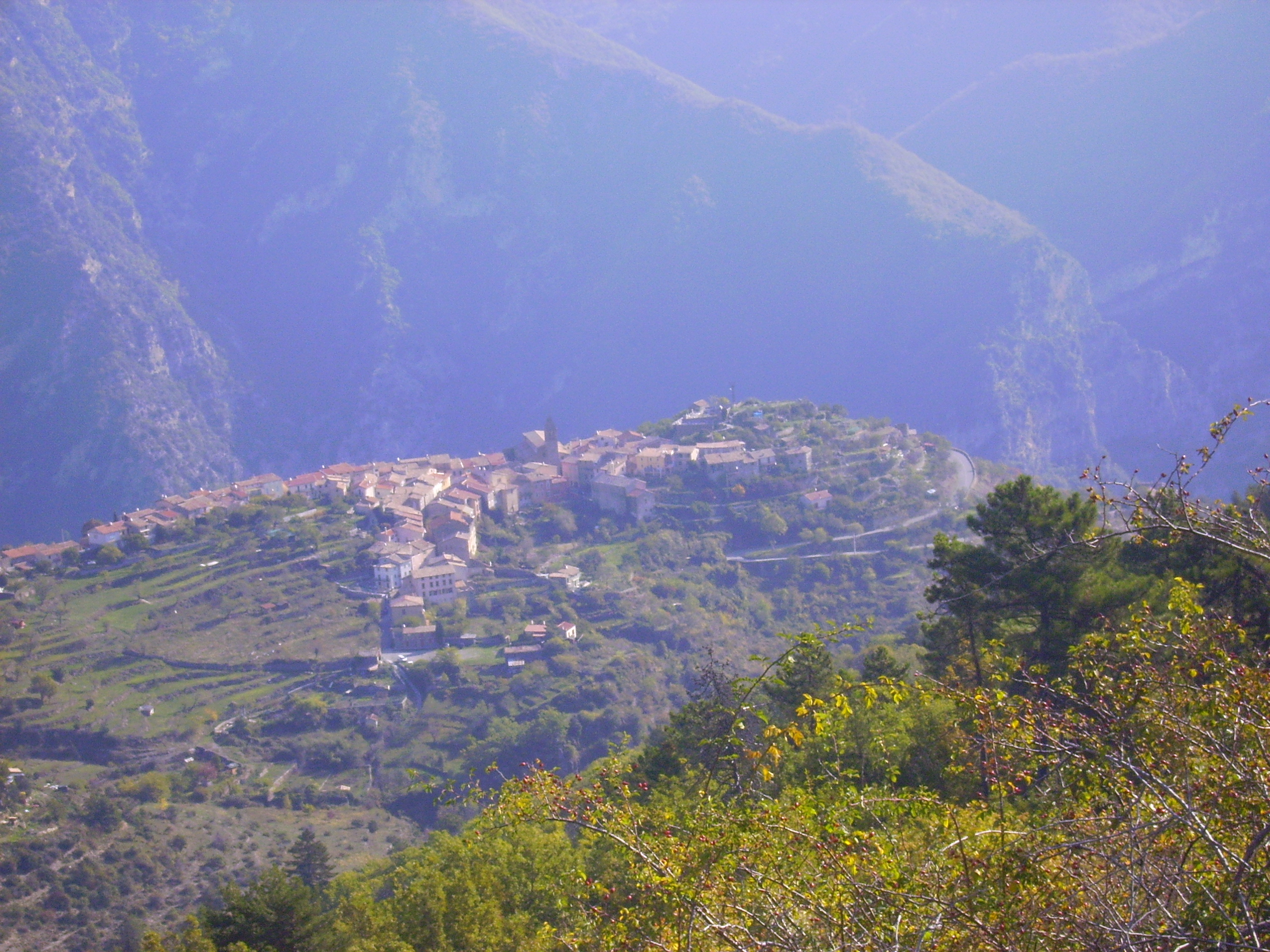
- A view of Utelle from a nearby hillside

- Coat of arms
- Location of Utelle
- Location within France Location within Provence-Alpes-Côte d'Azur
- Coordinates: 43°55′07″N 7°14′53″E
- Country: France
- Region: Provence-Alpes-Côte d'Azur
- Department: Alpes-Maritimes
- Arrondissement: Nice
- Canton: Tourrette-Levens
- Intercommunality: Métropole Nice Côte d'Azur

Government
  - Mayor (2026–32): Alain Faraut
- Area^{1}: 67.97 km^{2} (26.24 sq mi)
- Elevation: 800 m (2,600 ft)
- Highest elevation: 2,080 m (6,820 ft)
- Lowest elevation: 126 m (413 ft)
- Population (2023): 805
  - Density: 11.8/km^{2} (30.7/sq mi)
- Time zone: UTC+01:00 (CET)
  - Summer (DST): UTC+02:00 (CEST)
- INSEE/Postal code: 06151 /06450
- ^{1} French Land Register data, which excludes lakes, ponds, glaciers > 1 km^{2} (0.386 sq mi or 247 acres) and river estuaries.

Utelle (French pronunciation: [ytɛl]; Occitan: Uels; Italian: Utello) is a commune about 40 miles (64 km) northeast of Nice in the Alpes-Maritimes department in southeastern France.

== Geography ==
It is perched on a hill along the Vesubie Gorge not far from the Mercantour National Park.

== Sights ==
Formerly an agricultural village planted with numerous olive trees, the village is near the Madonne d'Utelle, a chapel that serves as an annual pilgrimage site for local Catholics. In their 1997 book "The Templar Revelation," Lynn Picknett and Clive Prince mention (on pg. 82) "the old Templar town of Utelle, whose medieval houses still bear the esoteric sigils of the alchemists..." It is one of sixteen villages grouped together by the Métropole Nice Côte d'Azur tourist department as the Route des Villages Perchés (Route of Perched Villages). The others are: Aspremont, Carros, Castagniers, Coaraze, Colomars, Duranus, Èze, Falicon, La Gaude, Lantosque, Levens, La Roquette-sur-Var, Saint-Blaise, Saint-Jeannet and Tourrette-Levens.

== Population ==
Historical population
Year	Pop.	±% p.a.
1968	516	—
1975	451	−1.91%
1982	398	−1.77%
1990	456	+1.72%
1999	488	+0.76%
2007	685	+4.33%
2012	765	+2.23%
2017	873	+2.68%
2023	805	−1.34%
Source: INSEE

== See also ==
Communes of the Alpes-Maritimes department
