= Tourrette-Levens =

Commune in Provence-Alpes-Côte d'Azur, France

- Commune
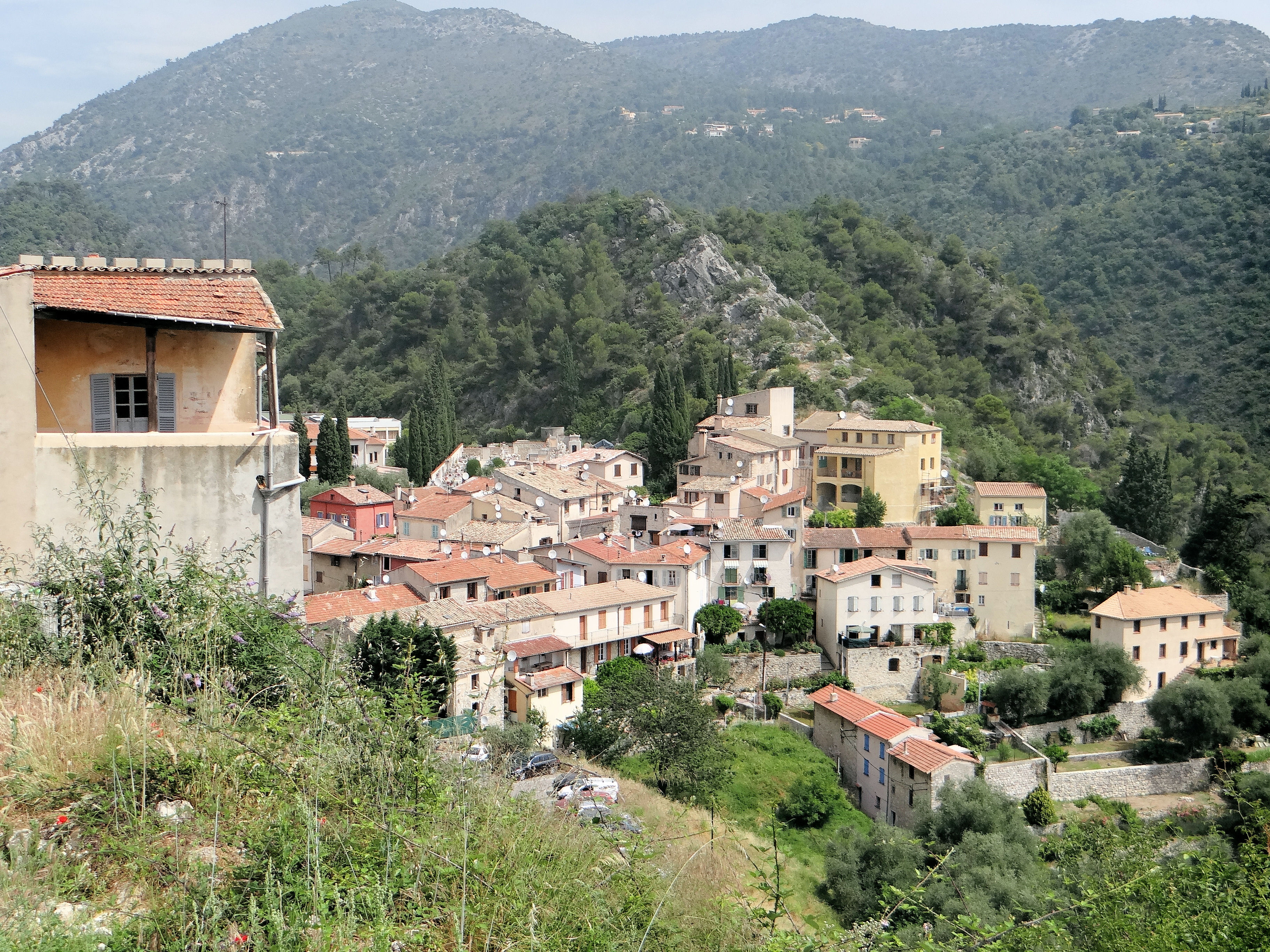
- A view of Tourrette-Levens from the castle

- Coat of arms
- Location of Tourrette-Levens
- Location within France Location within Provence-Alpes-Côte d'Azur
- Coordinates: 43°47′15″N 7°16′36″E
- Country: France
- Region: Provence-Alpes-Côte d'Azur
- Department: Alpes-Maritimes
- Arrondissement: Nice
- Canton: Tourrette-Levens
- Intercommunality: Métropole Nice Côte d'Azur

Government
  - Mayor (2026–32): Bertrand Gasiglia
- Area^{1}: 16.5 km^{2} (6.4 sq mi)
- Elevation: 390 m (1,280 ft)
- Highest elevation: 845 m (2,772 ft)
- Lowest elevation: 160 m (520 ft)
- Population (2023): 4,624
  - Density: 280/km^{2} (726/sq mi)
- Demonym: Tourrettans
- Time zone: UTC+01:00 (CET)
  - Summer (DST): UTC+02:00 (CEST)
- INSEE/Postal code: 06147 /06690
- ^{1} French Land Register data, which excludes lakes, ponds, glaciers > 1 km^{2} (0.386 sq mi or 247 acres) and river estuaries.

Tourrette-Levens (French pronunciation: [turɛt ləvɛ̃s]; Occitan: Torreta de Levens; Italian: Torretta Levenzo) is a commune in the Alpes-Maritimes department in southeastern France.

== Climate ==
Climate data for Tourrette-Levens (2018-2024), altitude: 416 m
Month	Jan	Feb	Mar	Apr	May	Jun	Jul	Aug	Sep	Oct	Nov	Dec	Year
Mean daily maximum °C (°F)	11.4 (52.5)	13.6 (56.5)	15.3 (59.5)	17.4 (63.3)	21.2 (70.2)	26.4 (79.5)	29.9 (85.8)	30.0 (86.0)	25.7 (78.3)	20.3 (68.5)	14.8 (58.6)	11.8 (53.2)	19.8 (67.7)
Daily mean °C (°F)	7.5 (45.5)	9.2 (48.6)	10.7 (51.3)	12.7 (54.9)	16.4 (61.5)	21.2 (70.2)	24.3 (75.7)	24.6 (76.3)	20.8 (69.4)	16.0 (60.8)	11.2 (52.2)	8.4 (47.1)	15.3 (59.5)
Mean daily minimum °C (°F)	3.7 (38.7)	4.9 (40.8)	6.1 (43.0)	8.0 (46.4)	11.6 (52.9)	16.0 (60.8)	18.8 (65.8)	19.1 (66.4)	15.9 (60.6)	12.0 (53.6)	7.7 (45.9)	5.1 (41.2)	10.7 (51.3)
Average precipitation mm (inches)	38.4 (1.51)	53.5 (2.11)	62.6 (2.46)	65.3 (2.57)	59.0 (2.32)	35.9 (1.41)	15.8 (0.62)	20.4 (0.80)	32.4 (1.28)	96.0 (3.78)	96.1 (3.78)	97.2 (3.83)	672.6 (26.47)
Average precipitation days (≥ 1 mm)	2.8	3.8	4.6	7.2	6.3	4.2	2.8	2.3	4.3	7.5	8.5	6.7	61
Mean monthly sunshine hours	102.9	121.7	151.5	146.4	148.7	157.1	178.0	149.0	139.0	99.6	75.5	68.7	1,538.1
Source: Infoclimat

== Population ==
Historical population
Year	Pop.	±% p.a.
1968	2,650	—
1975	2,644	−0.03%
1982	3,004	+1.84%
1990	3,412	+1.60%
1999	4,116	+2.11%
2007	4,709	+1.70%
2012	4,786	+0.32%
2017	4,951	+0.68%
2023	4,624	−1.13%
Source: INSEE

== Tourism ==
Tourrette-Levens is one of sixteen villages grouped together by the Métropole Nice Côte d'Azur tourist department as the Route des Villages Perchés (Route of Perched Villages). The others are: Aspremont, Carros, Castagniers, Coaraze, Colomars, Duranus, Èze, Falicon, La Gaude, Lantosque, Levens, La Roquette-sur-Var, Saint-Blaise, Saint-Jeannet and Utelle.

== See also ==
- Communes of the Alpes-Maritimes department
