= Aspremont, Alpes-Maritimes =

Commune in Provence-Alpes-Côte d'Azur, France

Aspremont Aspermùnt (Niçard) Aspromonte di Nizza (Italian)
- Commune
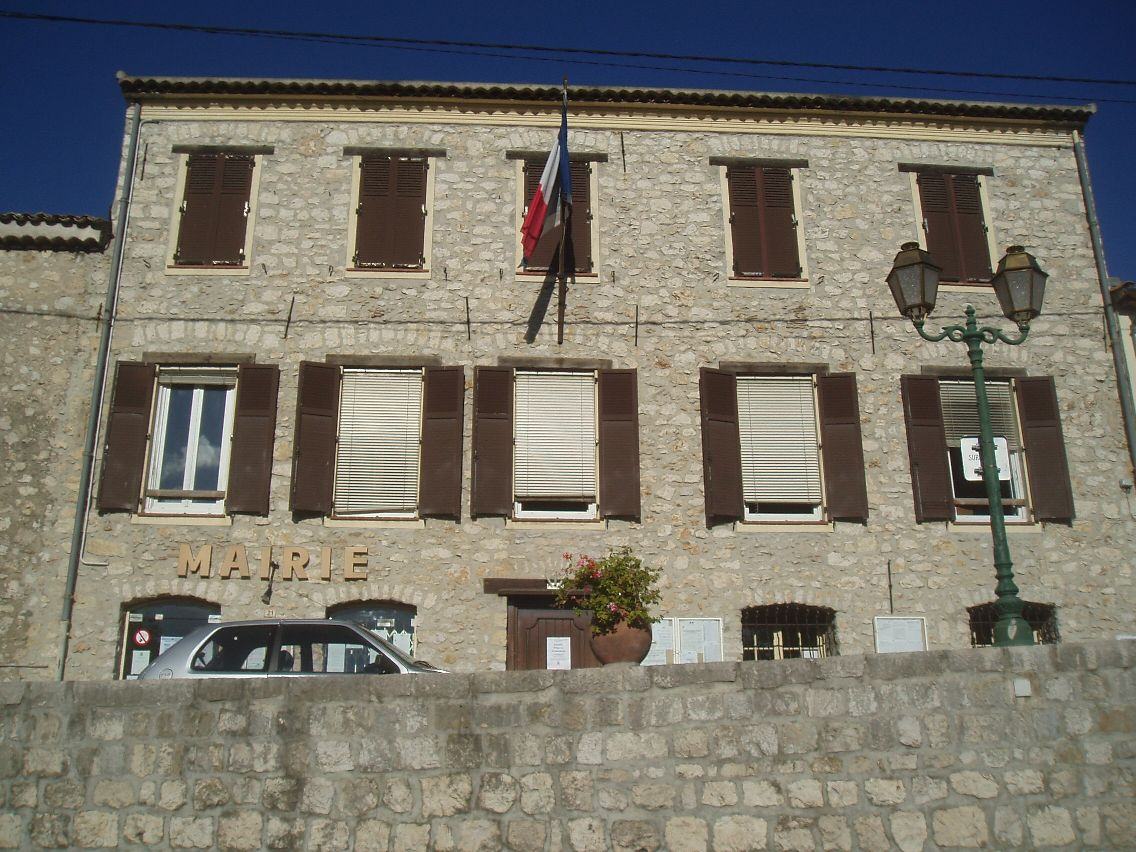
- Aspremont Town Hall

- Coat of arms
- Location of Aspremont
- Location within France Location within Provence-Alpes-Côte d'Azur
- Coordinates: 43°47′03″N 7°14′42″E
- Country: France
- Region: Provence-Alpes-Côte d'Azur
- Department: Alpes-Maritimes
- Arrondissement: Nice
- Canton: Tourrette-Levens
- Intercommunality: Métropole Nice Côte d'Azur

Government
  - Mayor (2026–32): Pascal Bonsignore
- Area^{1}: 9.44 km^{2} (3.64 sq mi)
- Elevation: 530 m (1,740 ft)
- Highest elevation: 855 m (2,805 ft)
- Lowest elevation: 100 m (330 ft)
- Population (2023): 2,346
  - Density: 249/km^{2} (644/sq mi)
- Time zone: UTC+01:00 (CET)
  - Summer (DST): UTC+02:00 (CEST)
- INSEE/Postal code: 06006 /06790
- ^{1} French Land Register data, which excludes lakes, ponds, glaciers > 1 km^{2} (0.386 sq mi or 247 acres) and river estuaries.

Aspremont (French pronunciation: [aspʁəmɔ̃]; Italian: Aspromonte di Nizza, formerly; Niçard: Aspermùnt) is a commune in the Alpes-Maritimes department in the Provence-Alpes-Côte d'Azur region in Southeastern France.

== Geography ==
Aspremont is located some 10 km north of Nice and 5 km east of Carros. Access to the commune is by road M414 (Route de Nice) from Nice in the south, by the M14 road from Saint-Blaise in the north, and by the M719 from Tourrette-Levens in the east. Apart from the village there are the towns of Les Salettes, La Plaine, La Valliere, and La Prairie near the village and Les Templiers, Bassac, Cabanes Bletonnieres, and Gibeste in the south. The commune is rugged and heavily forested in the west and east.

The Magnan river rises near the village and flows south through the heart of the commune then to the Mediterranean Sea in the south-west of Nice.

Aspremont is one of sixteen villages grouped together by the Métropole Nice Côte d'Azur tourist department as the Route des Villages Perchés (Route of Perched Villages). The others are: Carros, Castagniers, Coaraze, Colomars, Duranus, Èze, Falicon, La Gaude, Lantosque, Levens, La Roquette-sur-Var, Saint-Blaise, Saint-Jeannet, Tourrette-Levens and Utelle.

== History ==
After the abandonment of the Aspremont-le-Vieux site in 1426, a fortified village was built in concentric circles at the foot of Mont-Chauve on a hill overlooking a path between the Var and the Paillon de Tourrette Valley. Soil and sunshine favoured the cultivation of vines, olives, and fruit trees, particularly fig trees. There was production of wine and olive oil in the county until the end of the 19th century.

In 1874 Aspremont had its land area divided to create the new communes of Colomars and Castagniers.

=== Heraldry ===
Arms of Aspremont	Blazon: Argent, an eagle of Gules preying on a mount of 3 hillocks of Sable issuant in base, surmounted by a mullet of Azure.

== Administration ==
List of Successive Mayors

From	To	Name	Party
	1981	Léon Astraudo	
1981	2001	Honoré Trastour	
2001	2020	Alexandre Ferretti	DVD
2020	Current	Pascal Bonsignore	

== Demographics ==
Historical population
Year	Pop.	±% p.a.
1968	698	—
1975	771	+1.43%
1982	1,150	+5.88%
1990	1,496	+3.34%
1999	1,853	+2.41%
2007	2,106	+1.61%
2012	2,179	+0.68%
2017	2,187	+0.07%
2023	2,346	+1.18%
Source: INSEE

The inhabitants of the commune are known as Aspremontois (masculine) or Aspremontoises (feminine) in French.

== Sites and monuments ==
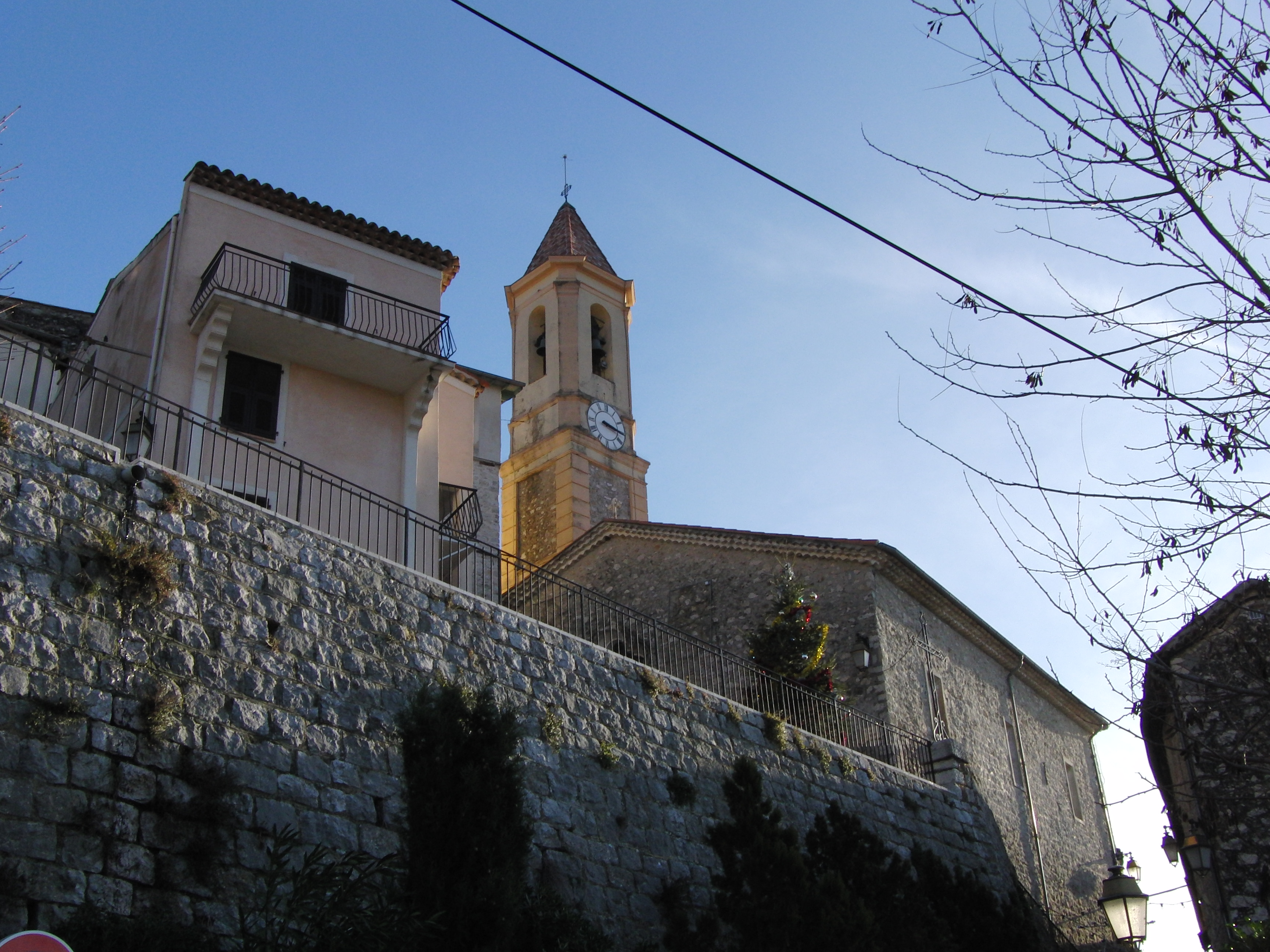
Church of Saint-Jacques le Mejeur

- Fort of Mont Chauve of Aspremont (19th century)
- Ruins of the medieval village on Mont Cima
- The house where François-Xavier Maistre was born
- Church of Saint-Jacques le Mejeur
- Chapel of Saint-Claude
- Chapel of Notre-Dame des Salettes

== Notable people linked to the commune ==
- François-Xavier Maistre (1705–1789), President of the Senate of Savoy, father of Joseph de Maistre and Xavier de Maistre, was a native of Aspremont in the County of Nice.
- Magma, a musical group, has had a recording studio in the commune since 2010.

== Twin towns ==
- Montechiaro d'Acqui, Italy (2003)

== See also ==
- Communes of the Alpes-Maritimes department
