= Colomars =

Commune in Provence-Alpes-Côte d'Azur, France

- Commune
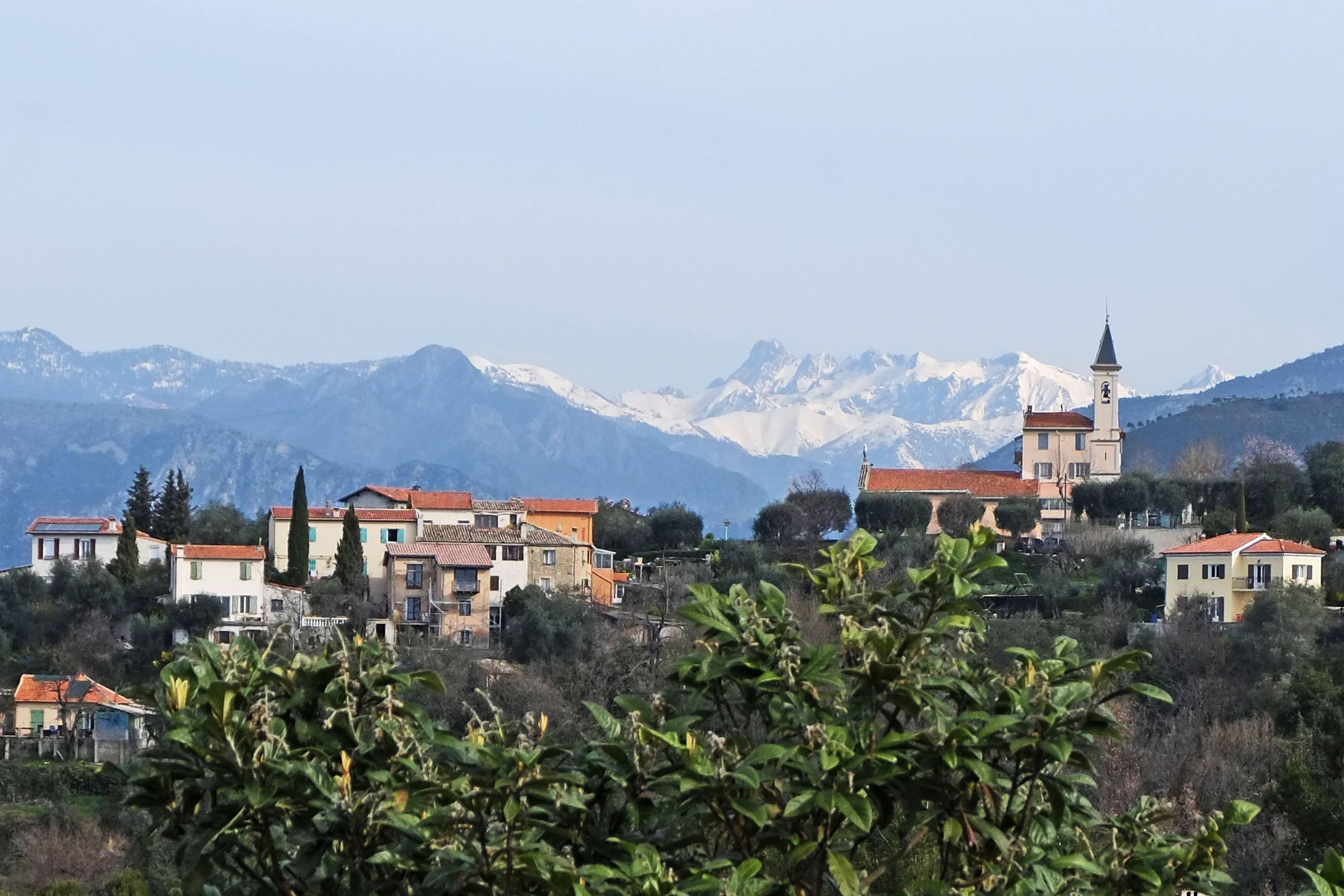
- A view of the church of Colomars, from the road to Nice

- Coat of arms
- Location of Colomars
- Location within France Location within Provence-Alpes-Côte d'Azur
- Coordinates: 43°45′52″N 7°13′22″E
- Country: France
- Region: Provence-Alpes-Côte d'Azur
- Department: Alpes-Maritimes
- Arrondissement: Nice
- Canton: Tourrette-Levens
- Intercommunality: Métropole Nice Côte d'Azur

Government
  - Mayor (2026–32): Isabelle Brès
- Area^{1}: 6.72 km^{2} (2.59 sq mi)
- Elevation: 300 m (980 ft)
- Highest elevation: 402 m (1,319 ft)
- Lowest elevation: 57 m (187 ft)
- Population (2023): 3,409
  - Density: 507/km^{2} (1,310/sq mi)
- Time zone: UTC+01:00 (CET)
  - Summer (DST): UTC+02:00 (CEST)
- INSEE/Postal code: 06046 /06670
- ^{1} French Land Register data, which excludes lakes, ponds, glaciers > 1 km^{2} (0.386 sq mi or 247 acres) and river estuaries.

Colomars (French pronunciation: [kɔlɔmaʁ]; Nissart: Couloumas; Italian: Colomarte) is a commune in the Alpes-Maritimes département in the Provence-Alpes-Côte d'Azur region in southeastern France.

Inhabitants of Colomars are called Colomarsois. Colomars is a part of the Pays Niçois. The local dialect is Nissart.

Colomars is 15 minutes away from the center of Nice by car. The village has both a sea and mountains view.

== Geography ==
Colomars is a residential area, located in a valley between Var to the west and Mont Chauve to the east. There are many pines and olive trees in the centre of the village. The fortress in Colomars was built in 1880 and the Sirole chapel was inaugurated in 1857.

== History ==
Colomars was founded in 1070 by the monastery of Saint-Pons for the children of Raimbaud de Nice and Rostaing de Gréolièrs. A decree signed on 2 June 1874 by Maréchal de Mac Mahon separated Colomars, Aspremont and Castagniers into three separate villages. The municipality has celebrated 125 years of age on 19 September 1999.

== Administration ==
The current mayor of Colomars is Isabelle Brès, since March 2008.

== Population ==
Historical population
Year	Pop.	±% p.a.
1968	979	—
1975	1,241	+3.45%
1982	1,714	+4.72%
1990	2,307	+3.78%
1999	2,876	+2.48%
2007	3,199	+1.34%
2012	3,318	+0.73%
2017	3,424	+0.63%
2023	3,409	−0.07%
Source: INSEE

== Tourism ==
Colomars is one of sixteen villages grouped together by the Métropole Nice Côte d'Azur tourist department as the Route des Villages Perchés (Route of Perched Villages). The others are: Aspremont, Carros, Castagniers, Coaraze, Duranus, Èze, Falicon, La Gaude, Lantosque, Levens, La Roquette-sur-Var, Saint-Blaise, Saint-Jeannet, Tourrette-Levens and Utelle.

== See also ==
- Communes of the Alpes-Maritimes department
