= Saint-Blaise, Alpes-Maritimes =

Commune in Provence-Alpes-Côte d'Azur, France

Saint-Blaise
- Commune
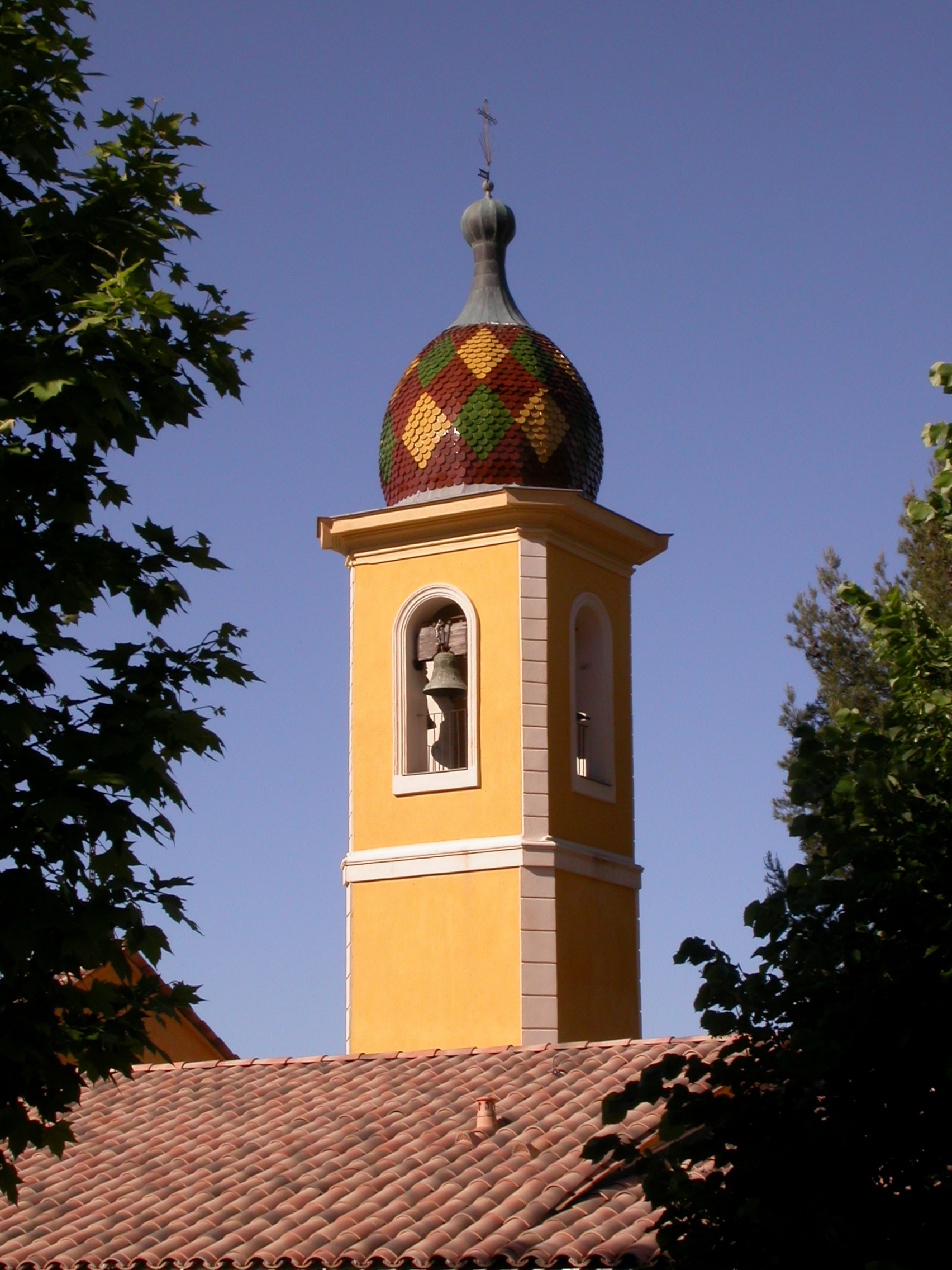
- The bell tower of the church

- Coat of arms
- Location of Saint-Blaise
- Location within France Location within Provence-Alpes-Côte d'Azur
- Coordinates: 43°49′21″N 7°14′18″E
- Country: France
- Region: Provence-Alpes-Côte d'Azur
- Department: Alpes-Maritimes
- Arrondissement: Nice
- Canton: Tourrette-Levens
- Intercommunality: Métropole Nice Côte d'Azur

Government
  - Mayor (2026–32): Jean-Paul Fabre
- Area^{1}: 8.04 km^{2} (3.10 sq mi)
- Elevation: 325 m (1,066 ft)
- Highest elevation: 808 m (2,651 ft)
- Lowest elevation: 88 m (289 ft)
- Population (2023): 1,397
  - Density: 174/km^{2} (450/sq mi)
- Time zone: UTC+01:00 (CET)
  - Summer (DST): UTC+02:00 (CEST)
- INSEE/Postal code: 06117 /06670
- ^{1} French Land Register data, which excludes lakes, ponds, glaciers > 1 km^{2} (0.386 sq mi or 247 acres) and river estuaries.

Saint-Blaise (French pronunciation: [sɛ̃ blɛz]; Occitan: Sant Blai; Italian: San Biagio) is a commune in the Alpes-Maritimes département in southeastern France.

== Population ==
Historical population
Year	Pop.	±% p.a.
1968	190	—
1975	210	+1.44%
1982	339	+7.08%
1990	640	+8.27%
1999	892	+3.76%
2007	928	+0.50%
2012	988	+1.26%
2017	1,019	+0.62%
2023	1,397	+5.40%
Source: INSEE

== Tourism ==
Saint-Blaise is one of sixteen villages grouped together by the Métropole Nice Côte d'Azur tourist department as the Route des Villages Perchés (Route of Perched Villages). The others are: Aspremont, Carros, Castagniers, Coaraze, Colomars, Duranus, Èze, Falicon, La Gaude, Lantosque, Levens, La Roquette-sur-Var, Saint-Jeannet, Tourrette-Levens and Utelle.

== See also ==
- Communes of the Alpes-Maritimes department
