= Castagniers =

Commune in Provence-Alpes-Côte d'Azur, France

- Commune
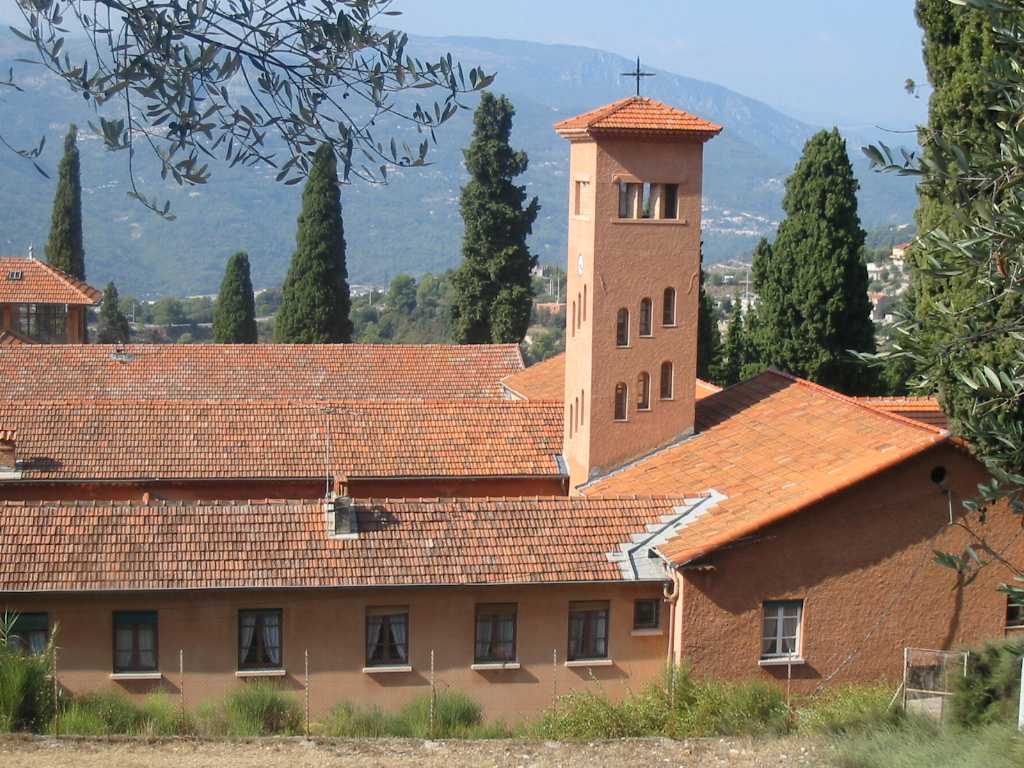
- The monastery

- Coat of arms
- Location of Castagniers
- Location within France Location within Provence-Alpes-Côte d'Azur
- Coordinates: 43°47′32″N 7°13′56″E
- Country: France
- Region: Provence-Alpes-Côte d'Azur
- Department: Alpes-Maritimes
- Arrondissement: Nice
- Canton: Tourrette-Levens
- Intercommunality: Métropole Nice Côte d'Azur

Government
  - Mayor (2026–32): Jean-François Spinelli
- Area^{1}: 7.52 km^{2} (2.90 sq mi)
- Elevation: 382 m (1,253 ft)
- Highest elevation: 881 m (2,890 ft)
- Lowest elevation: 68 m (223 ft)
- Population (2023): 1,666
  - Density: 222/km^{2} (574/sq mi)
- Demonym: Castagnérenques
- Time zone: UTC+01:00 (CET)
  - Summer (DST): UTC+02:00 (CEST)
- INSEE/Postal code: 06034 /06670
- ^{1} French Land Register data, which excludes lakes, ponds, glaciers > 1 km^{2} (0.386 sq mi or 247 acres) and river estuaries.

Castagniers (French pronunciation: [kastaɲe]; Occitan: Castanhiers; Italian: Castagnera) is a commune in the Alpes-Maritimes department in southeastern France.

== Population ==
Historical population
Year	Pop.	±% p.a.
1968	820	—
1975	958	+2.25%
1982	1,076	+1.67%
1990	1,229	+1.68%
1999	1,359	+1.12%
2007	1,494	+1.19%
2012	1,540	+0.61%
2017	1,616	+0.97%
2023	1,666	+0.51%
Source: INSEE

== Tourism ==
Castagniers is one of sixteen villages grouped together by the Métropole Nice Côte d'Azur tourist department as the Route des Villages Perchés (Route of Perched Villages). The others are: Aspremont, Carros, Coaraze, Colomars, Duranus, Èze, Falicon, La Gaude, Lantosque, Levens, La Roquette-sur-Var, Saint-Blaise, Saint-Jeannet, Tourrette-Levens, and Utelle.

== See also ==
- Castagniers Abbey
- Communes of the Alpes-Maritimes department
