= Coaraze =

Commune in Provence-Alpes-Côte d'Azur, France

- Commune
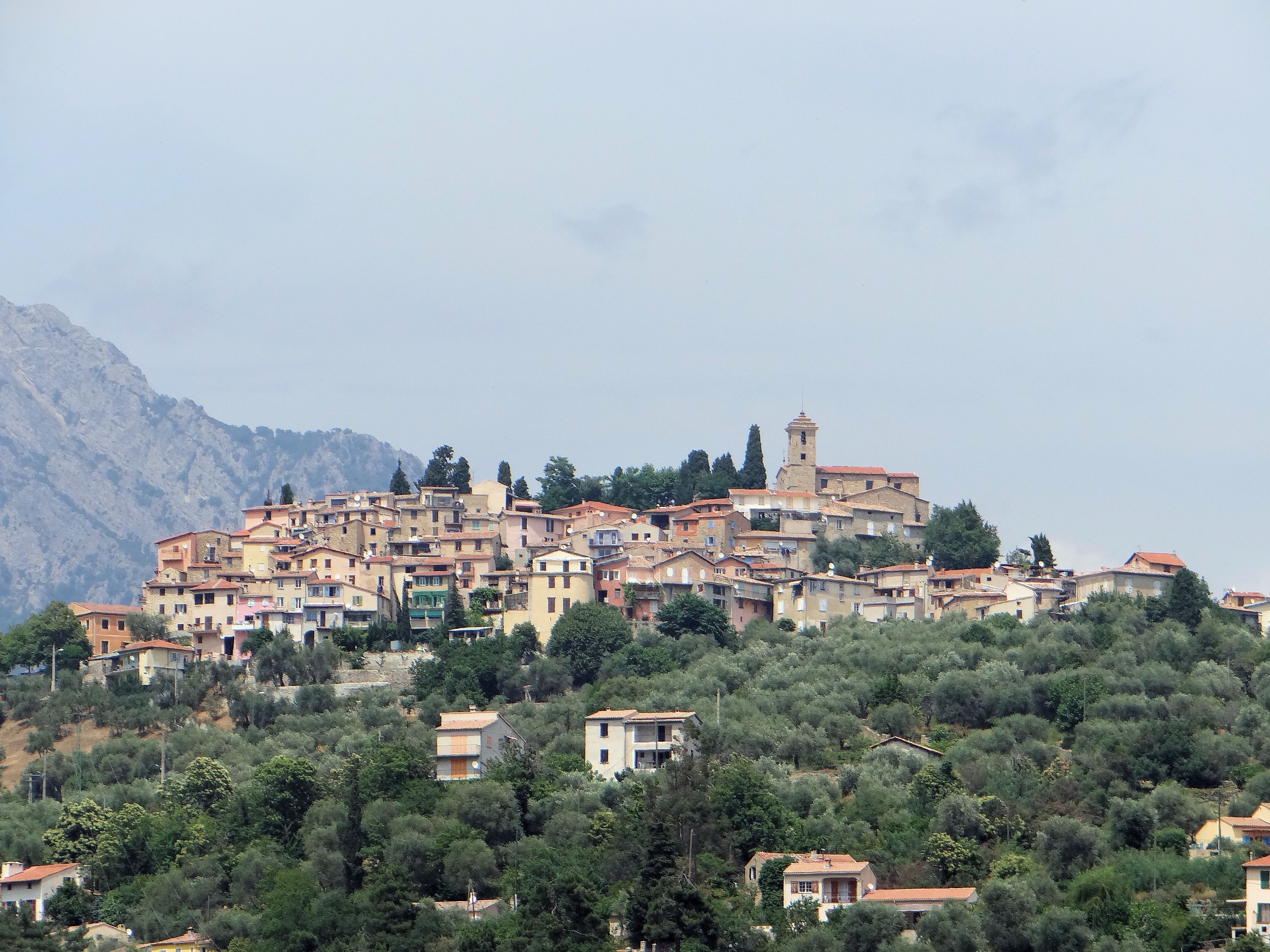
- An overall view of the village of Coaraze

- Coat of arms
- Location of Coaraze
- Location within France Location within Provence-Alpes-Côte d'Azur
- Coordinates: 43°51′54″N 7°17′45″E
- Country: France
- Region: Provence-Alpes-Côte d'Azur
- Department: Alpes-Maritimes
- Arrondissement: Nice
- Canton: Contes
- Intercommunality: CC du Pays des Paillons

Government
  - Mayor (2026–32): Fabien Guglielmino
- Area^{1}: 17.14 km^{2} (6.62 sq mi)
- Elevation: 620 m (2,030 ft)
- Highest elevation: 1,414 m (4,639 ft)
- Lowest elevation: 313 m (1,027 ft)
- Population (2023): 827
  - Density: 48.2/km^{2} (125/sq mi)
- Time zone: UTC+01:00 (CET)
  - Summer (DST): UTC+02:00 (CEST)
- INSEE/Postal code: 06043 /06390
- ^{1} French Land Register data, which excludes lakes, ponds, glaciers > 1 km^{2} (0.386 sq mi or 247 acres) and river estuaries.

Coaraze (French pronunciation: [kɔaʁaz]; Occitan: Coarasa; Italian: Coarazza) is a commune in the Alpes-Maritimes department in the Provence-Alpes-Côte d'Azur region in southeastern France.

== Geography ==
Coaraze is a small village in the Nice hinterland, in the valley of the River Paillon. The closest town is Contes, 8 km (5.0 mi) away.

The village itself is built on a sandstone mount at the foot of Mount Férion (1,414 metres or 4,660 feet (1,420 m) high).

== History ==
Erected as a baronnie in 1629, Coaraze was under Spanish administration from 1744 to 1748. In the nineteenth century the old trail was replaced by a road.

== Population ==
Historical population
Year	Pop.	±% p.a.
1968	513	—
1975	327	−6.23%
1982	463	+5.09%
1990	540	+1.94%
1999	654	+2.15%
2007	721	+1.23%
2012	783	+1.66%
2017	831	+1.20%
2023	827	−0.08%
Source: INSEE

Its inhabitants are called Coaraziens in French.

== Tourism ==
Coaraze is one of sixteen villages grouped together by the Métropole Nice Côte d'Azur tourist department as the Route des Villages Perchés (Route of Perched Villages). The others are: Aspremont, Carros, Castagniers, Colomars, Duranus, Èze, Falicon, La Gaude, Lantosque, Levens, La Roquette-sur-Var, Saint-Blaise, Saint-Jeannet, Tourrette-Levens and Utelle.

Coaraze is a member of the Les Plus Beaux Villages de France (most beautiful villages of France) association.

== Personalities ==
- Jean Cocteau
- Jules Engel
- Paul Vérola: poète, écrivain, cousin du Tsar par alliance

== See also ==
- Communes of the Alpes-Maritimes department
