= Falicon =

Commune in Provence-Alpes-Côte d'Azur, France

- Commune
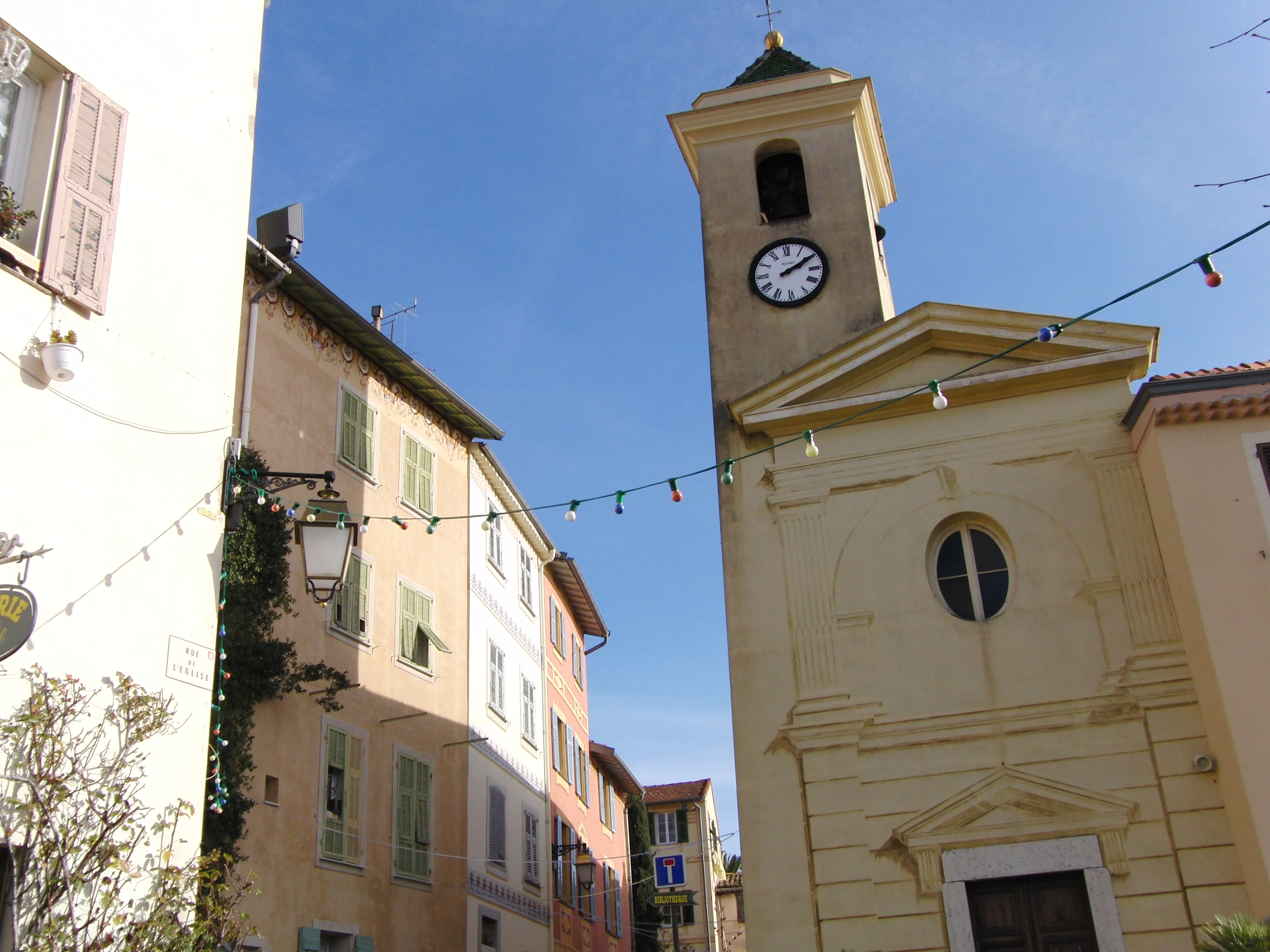
- The church in Falicon

- Coat of arms
- Location of Falicon
- Location within France Location within Provence-Alpes-Côte d'Azur
- Coordinates: 43°45′00″N 7°16′49″E
- Country: France
- Region: Provence-Alpes-Côte d'Azur
- Department: Alpes-Maritimes
- Arrondissement: Nice
- Canton: Tourrette-Levens
- Intercommunality: Métropole Nice Côte d'Azur

Government
  - Mayor (2026–32): Anaïs Tosel
- Area^{1}: 5.17 km^{2} (2.00 sq mi)
- Elevation: 300 m (980 ft)
- Highest elevation: 581 m (1,906 ft)
- Lowest elevation: 103 m (338 ft)
- Population (2023): 2,185
  - Density: 423/km^{2} (1,090/sq mi)
- Time zone: UTC+01:00 (CET)
  - Summer (DST): UTC+02:00 (CEST)
- INSEE/Postal code: 06060 /06950
- ^{1} French Land Register data, which excludes lakes, ponds, glaciers > 1 km^{2} (0.386 sq mi or 247 acres) and river estuaries.

Falicon (French pronunciation: [falikɔ̃]; Italian: Falicone) is a commune in the Alpes-Maritimes department in southeastern France.

== Population ==
Historical population
Year	Pop.	±% p.a.
1968	715	—
1975	877	+2.96%
1982	1,065	+2.81%
1990	1,498	+4.36%
1999	1,644	+1.04%
2007	1,874	+1.65%
2012	1,920	+0.49%
2017	1,992	+0.74%
2023	2,185	+1.55%
Source: INSEE

== Tourism ==
Falicon is one of sixteen villages grouped together by the Métropole Nice Côte d'Azur tourist department as the Route des Villages Perchés (Route of Perched Villages). The others are: Aspremont, Carros, Castagniers, Coaraze, Colomars, Duranus, Èze, La Gaude, Lantosque, Levens, La Roquette-sur-Var, Saint-Blaise, Saint-Jeannet, Tourrette-Levens and Utelle.

== Twin towns — sister cities ==
Falicon is twinned with:

- Merchweiler, Germany (1987)
- Castellino Tanaro, Italy (2004)

== See also ==
- Falicon pyramid
- Communes of the Alpes-Maritimes department
