= Duranus =

Commune in Provence-Alpes-Côte d'Azur, France

- Commune
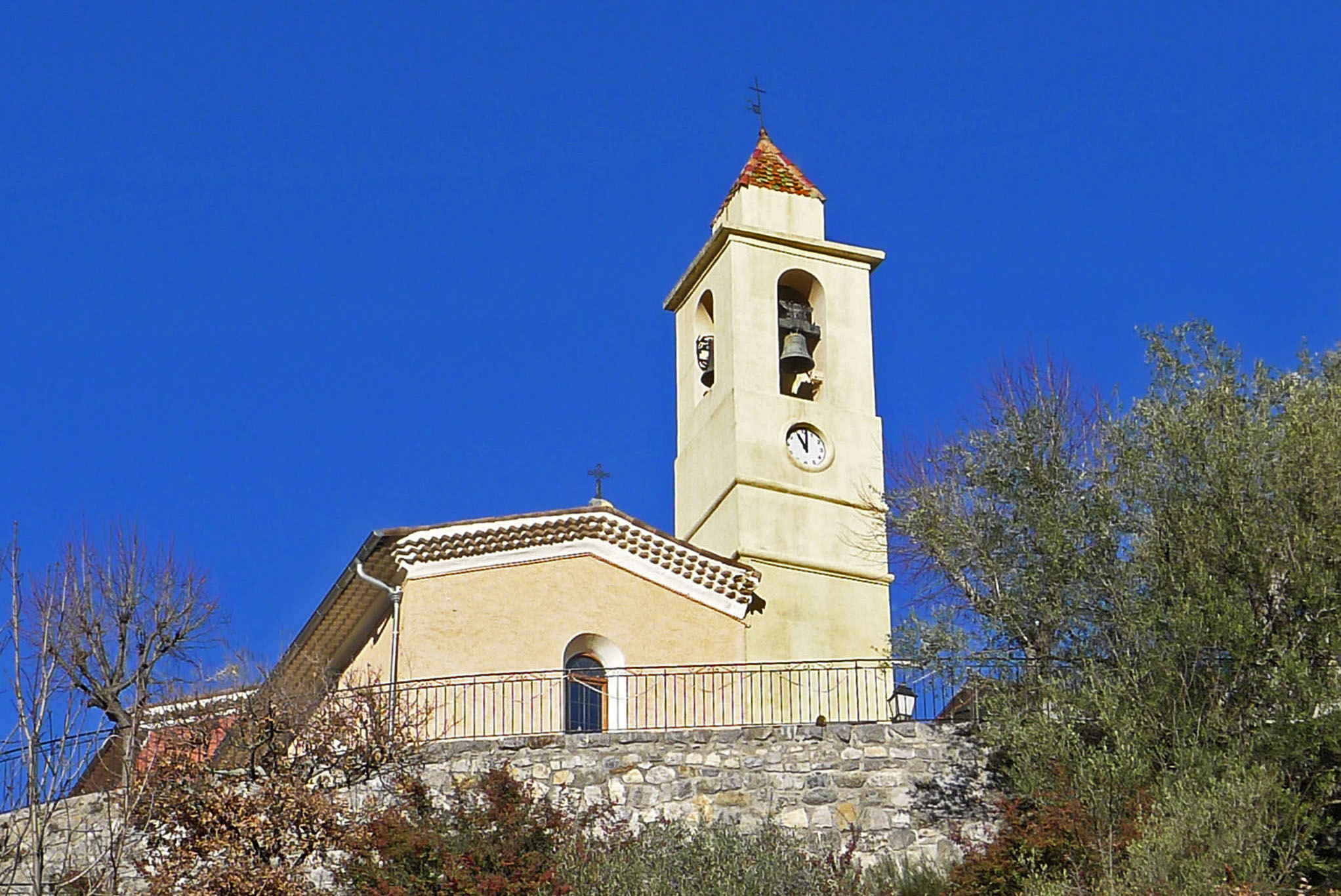
- The church of Duranus

- Coat of arms
- Location of Duranus
- Location within France Location within Provence-Alpes-Côte d'Azur
- Coordinates: 43°53′39″N 7°15′35″E
- Country: France
- Region: Provence-Alpes-Côte d'Azur
- Department: Alpes-Maritimes
- Arrondissement: Nice
- Canton: Tourrette-Levens
- Intercommunality: Métropole Nice Côte d'Azur

Government
  - Mayor (2026–32): Christian Maurel
- Area^{1}: 16.10 km^{2} (6.22 sq mi)
- Highest elevation: 1,500 m (4,900 ft)
- Lowest elevation: 194 m (636 ft)
- Population (2023): 151
  - Density: 9.38/km^{2} (24.3/sq mi)
- Time zone: UTC+01:00 (CET)
  - Summer (DST): UTC+02:00 (CEST)
- INSEE/Postal code: 06055 /06670
- ^{1} French Land Register data, which excludes lakes, ponds, glaciers > 1 km^{2} (0.386 sq mi or 247 acres) and river estuaries.

Duranus (French pronunciation: [dyʁanys]; Occitan: Duranús; Italian: Duranusso) is a commune in the Alpes-Maritimes department in southeastern France.

== Population ==
Historical population
Year	Pop.	±% p.a.
1968	118	—
1975	85	−4.58%
1982	118	+4.80%
1990	142	+2.34%
1999	156	+1.05%
2007	163	+0.55%
2012	170	+0.84%
2017	140	−3.81%
2023	151	+1.27%
Source: INSEE

== Tourism ==
Duranus is one of sixteen villages grouped together by the Métropole Nice Côte d'Azur tourist department as the Route des Villages Perchés (Route of Perched Villages). The others are as follows: Aspremont, Carros, Castagniers, Coaraze, Colomars, Èze, Falicon, La Gaude, Lantosque, Levens, La Roquette-sur-Var, Saint-Blaise, Saint-Jeannet, Tourrette-Levens and Utelle.

== See also ==
- Communes of the Alpes-Maritimes department
