= La Roquette-sur-Var =

Commune in Provence-Alpes-Côte d'Azur, France

- Commune
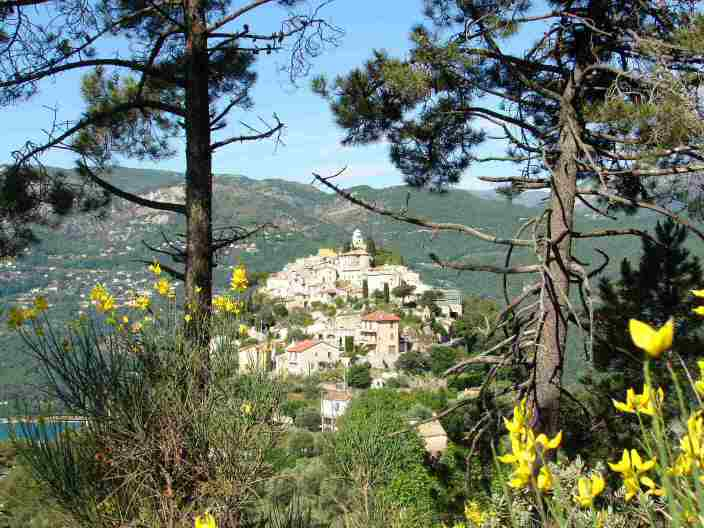
- La Roquette-sur-Var from across the hillside

- Coat of arms
- Location of La Roquette-sur-Var
- Location within France Location within Provence-Alpes-Côte d'Azur
- Coordinates: 43°49′45″N 7°11′59″E
- Country: France
- Region: Provence-Alpes-Côte d'Azur
- Department: Alpes-Maritimes
- Arrondissement: Nice
- Canton: Tourrette-Levens
- Intercommunality: Métropole Nice Côte d'Azur

Government
  - Mayor (2026–32): Nicole Labbe
- Area^{1}: 3.99 km^{2} (1.54 sq mi)
- Highest elevation: 600 m (2,000 ft)
- Lowest elevation: 108 m (354 ft)
- Population (2023): 921
  - Density: 231/km^{2} (598/sq mi)
- Time zone: UTC+01:00 (CET)
  - Summer (DST): UTC+02:00 (CEST)
- INSEE/Postal code: 06109 /06670
- ^{1} French Land Register data, which excludes lakes, ponds, glaciers > 1 km^{2} (0.386 sq mi or 247 acres) and river estuaries.

La Roquette-sur-Var (French pronunciation: [la ʁɔkɛt syʁ vaʁ], literally La Roquette on Var; Occitan: Sa Roqueta de Var; Italian: Rocchetta di Varo) is a commune in the Alpes-Maritimes department in southeastern France. It is one of sixteen villages grouped together by the Métropole Nice Côte d'Azur tourist department as the Route des Villages Perchés (Route of Perched Villages). The others are: Aspremont, Carros, Castagniers, Coaraze, Colomars, Duranus, Èze, Falicon, La Gaude, Lantosque, Levens, Saint-Blaise, Saint-Jeannet, Tourrette-Levens and Utelle.

== Population ==
Historical population
Year	Pop.	±% p.a.
1968	537	—
1975	506	−0.85%
1982	565	+1.59%
1990	660	+1.96%
1999	820	+2.44%
2007	928	+1.56%
2012	897	−0.68%
2017	940	+0.94%
2023	921	−0.34%
Source: INSEE

== See also ==
- Communes of the Alpes-Maritimes department
