= Èze =

Commune in Provence-Alpes-Côte d'Azur, France

Èze Esa (Occitan)
- Commune
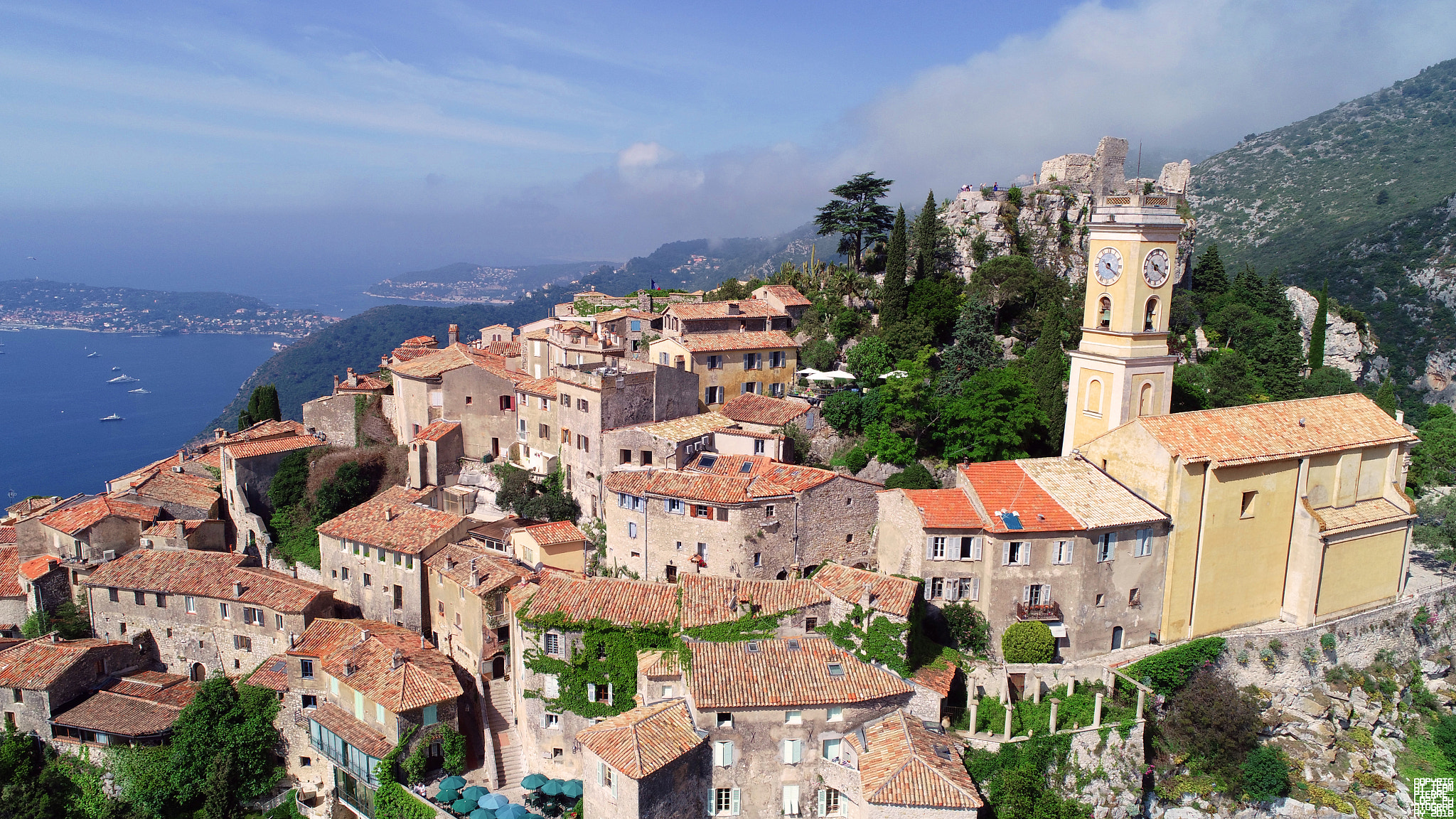
- A view of Èze
- Location of Èze
- Location within France Location within Provence-Alpes-Côte d'Azur
- Coordinates: 43°43′43″N 7°21′42″E
- Country: France
- Region: Provence-Alpes-Côte d'Azur
- Department: Alpes-Maritimes
- Arrondissement: Nice
- Canton: Beausoleil
- Intercommunality: Métropole Nice Côte d'Azur

Government
  - Mayor (2026–32): Stéphane Cherki
- Area^{1}: 9.47 km^{2} (3.66 sq mi)
- Highest elevation: 700 m (2,300 ft)
- Lowest elevation: 0 m (0 ft)
- Population (2023): 2,144
  - Density: 226/km^{2} (586/sq mi)
- Time zone: UTC+01:00 (CET)
  - Summer (DST): UTC+02:00 (CEST)
- INSEE/Postal code: 06059 /06360
- Website: https://ville-eze.fr
- ^{1} French Land Register data, which excludes lakes, ponds, glaciers > 1 km^{2} (0.386 sq mi or 247 acres) and river estuaries.

Èze (French pronunciation: [ɛːz]; Occitan: Esa; Italian: Eza) is a seaside commune in the Alpes-Maritimes department in the Provence-Alpes-Côte d'Azur region in Southeastern France. It is located on the French Riviera, 8.5 km (5.2 mi) to the northeast of Nice and 4.5 km (2.7 mi) to the west of Monaco. As of 2023, Èze had 2,144 inhabitants known as Ezasques (masculine and feminine) in French.

== History ==
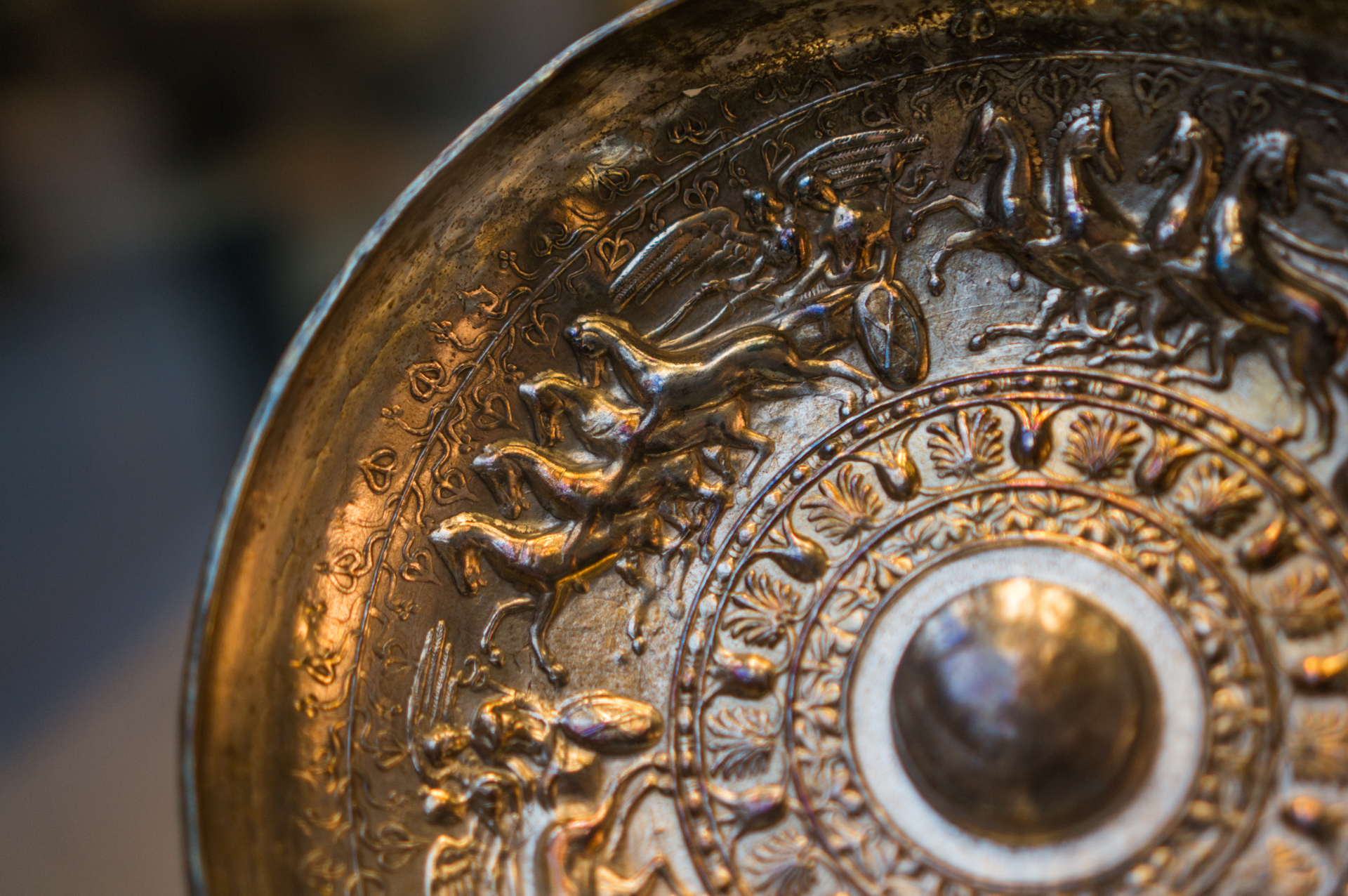
Detail of one of the silver plates from Èze in the British Museum

The area surrounding Èze was first populated around 200 BC as a commune situated near Mount Bastide. The earliest recorded mention of the area can be found in the maritime section of the Antonine Itinerary, which refers to the bay of Èze as Avisionis portus.

A hoard of ancient Greek silver phialae dating from the 3rd century BC was found in Èze in the late nineteenth century and is now part of the British Museum's collection. The area was subsequently occupied by not only the Romans but also the Moors, who held the area for approximately 80 years until they were driven out by William of Provence in 973.

By 1388, Èze fell under the jurisdiction of the House of Savoy, who built up the town as a fortified stronghold because of its proximity to Nice. The history of Èze became turbulent several times in the next few centuries as French and Ottoman troops seized the village under the command of Hayreddin Barbarossa in 1543, and Louis XIV destroyed the castle and walls surrounding the village in 1706 during the War of the Spanish Succession. Finally, in April 1860, Èze was designated as part of France by a unanimous vote by the people of Èze.

Èze has been described as an "eagle's nest" because of its location on a high cliff 427 metres (1,401 ft) above sea level on the French Mediterranean. It is so high that the light ochre church within (Notre Dame de l’Assomption built in 1764) can be seen from afar. An Egyptian cross inside the church suggests the village's ancient roots, when the Phoenicians erected a temple there to honour the goddess Isis.

Traditionally, the territory of the Principality of Monaco was considered to begin in the Èze village (outskirts of Nice), running along the Mediterranean coast to Menton, on the present Italian border.

== Geography ==
The commune of Èze is located on the French Riviera, extending from the Mediterranean Sea (Èze-sur-Mer) to the hilltop with a medieval village (Èze-Village). Saint-Laurent-d'Èze connects these villages.

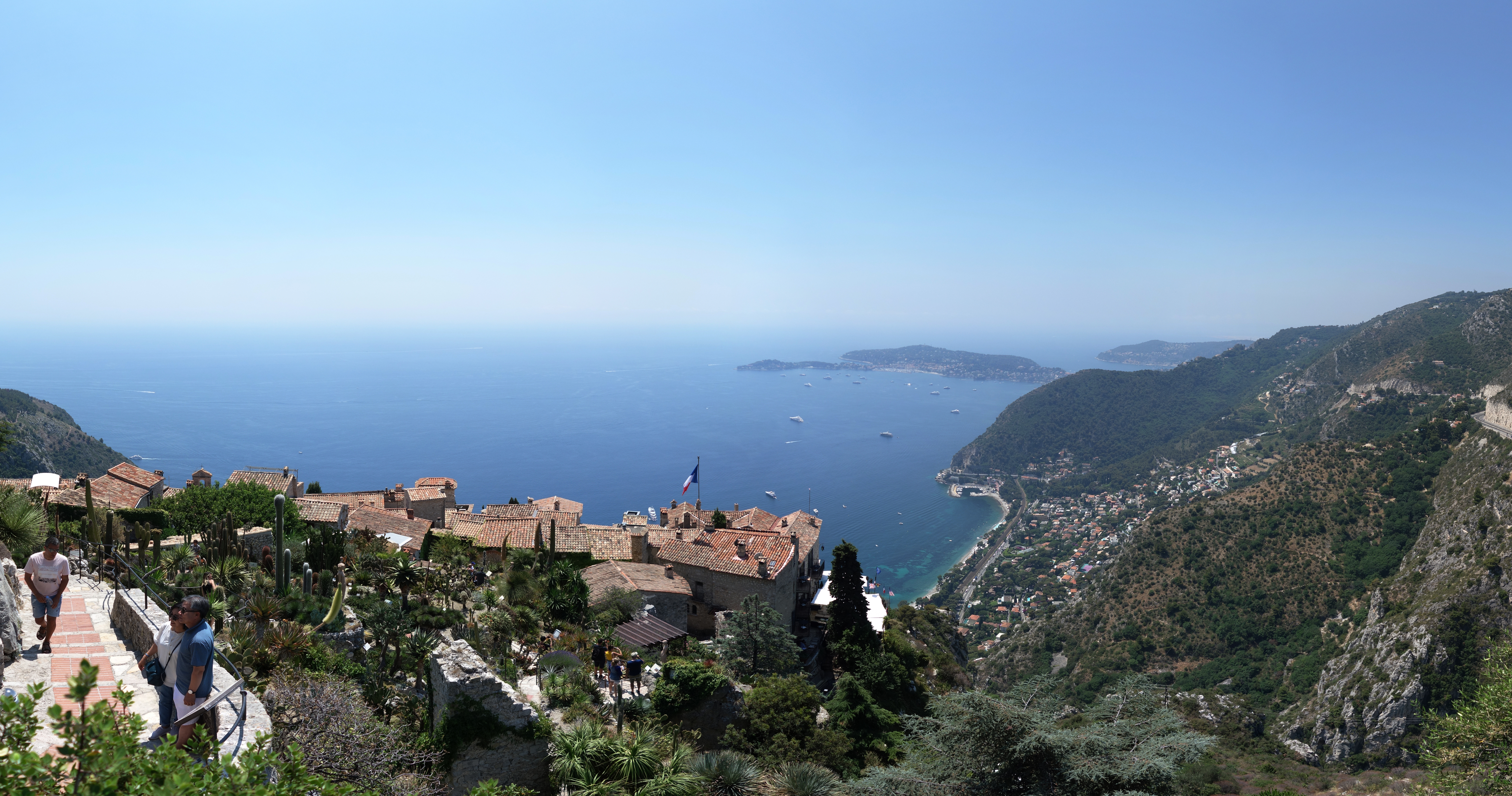
The Jardin botanique d'Èze and village known as Èze-bord-de-Mer as seen from the Château d'Èze

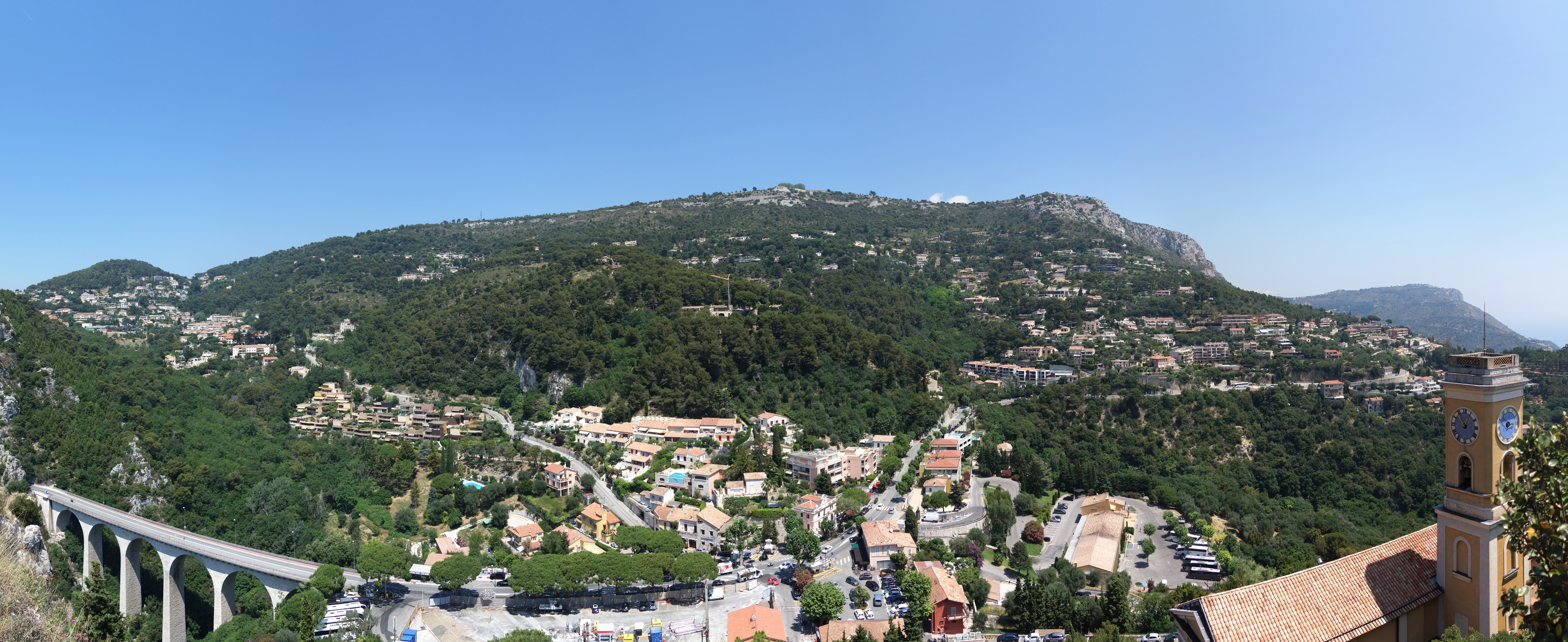
A panorama of the northern part of Èze as seen from the Château d'Èze

== Demographics ==
Historical population
Year	Pop.	±% p.a.
1968	1,792	—
1975	1,860	+0.53%
1982	2,063	+1.49%
1990	2,446	+2.15%
1999	2,509	+0.28%
2007	2,957	+2.07%
2012	2,535	−3.03%
2017	2,239	−2.45%
2023	2,144	−0.72%
Source: INSEE

== Tourism ==
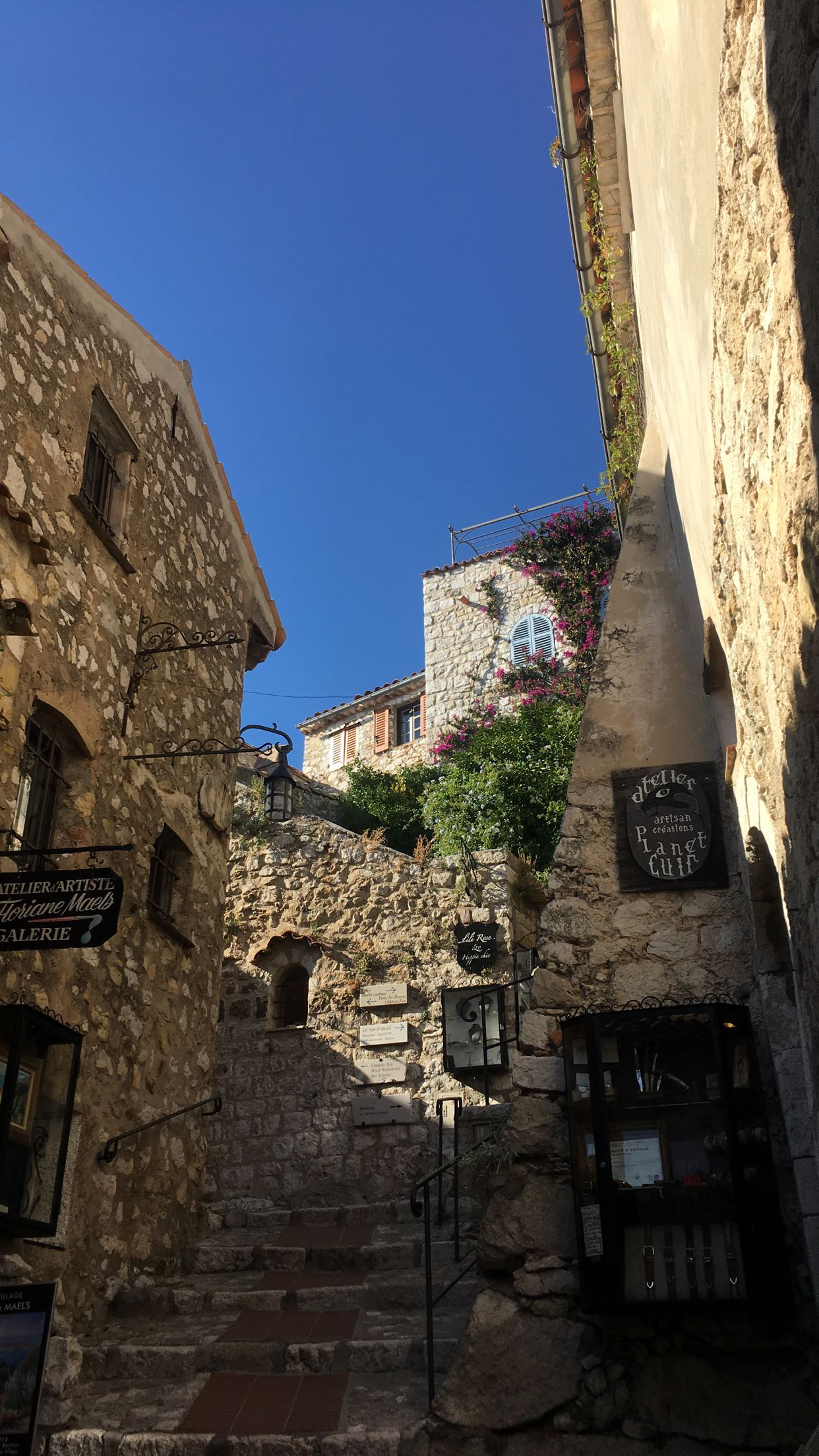
The buildings in the medieval village of Èze that have been turned into small shops and cafés.

Èze, renowned tourist site on the French Riviera, is famous worldwide for the view of the sea from its hill top. Its Jardin botanique d'Èze is known for its collection of cacti and succulents, as well as its panoramic views.

Walt Disney first visited Èze Village in 1956 and had dinner in the Château de la Chèvre d'Or that was acquired by hotelier Robert Wolf three years before. It was Walt Disney who suggested to Robert Wolf to transform the château into a hotel. And so, Robert Wolf acquired and converted nearby village houses into guest rooms. This innovative expansion helped establish the property as one of the original six stops on Relais & Châteaux's prestigious "Route du Bonheur" in 1954.

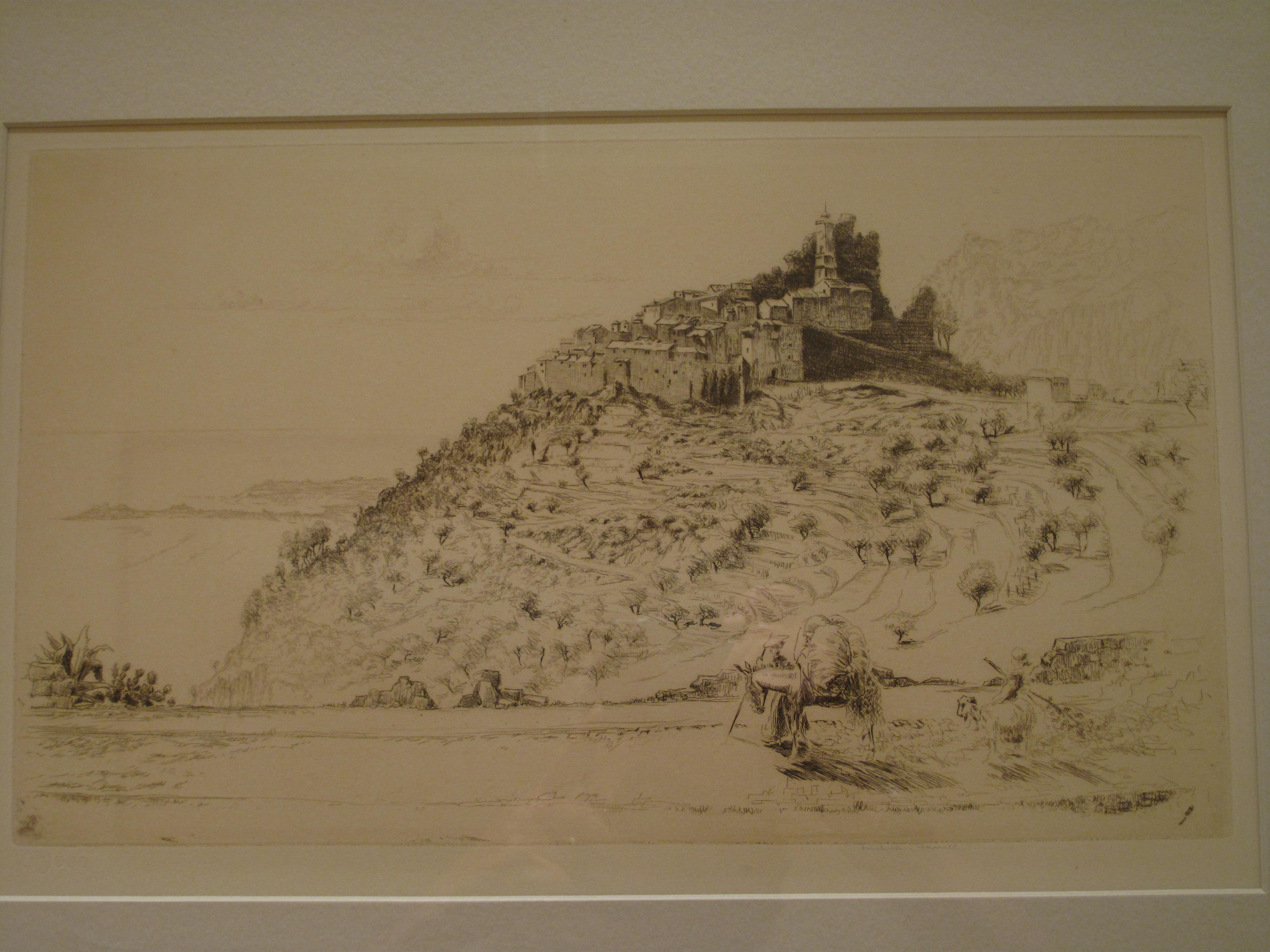
An old engraving of Èze

The oldest building in the village is the Chapelle de la Sainte Croix and dates back to 1306. Members of the lay order of the White Penitents of Èze, in charge of giving assistance to plague victims, would hold their meetings there. The shape of the bell-turret is an indication that the village once belonged to the Republic of Genoa.

The small medieval village is famous for its beauty and charm. Its many shops, art galleries, hotels and restaurants attract a large number of tourists and honeymooners. As a result, Èze has become dubbed by some a village-musée, a "museum village", as few residents of local origin live here. From Èze there are gorgeous views of the Mediterranean Sea.

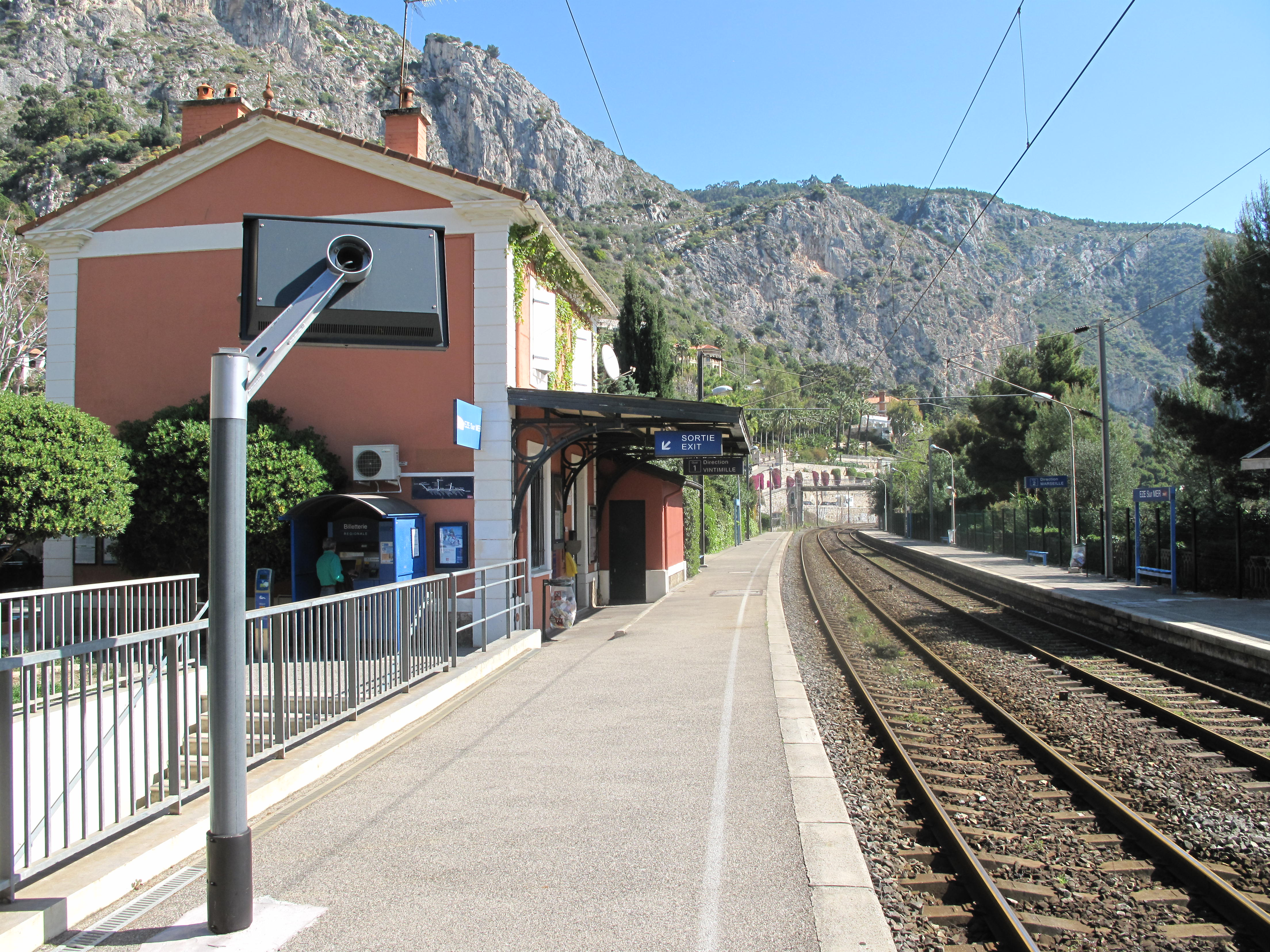
The railway building at Èze-sur-Mer on the Marseille–Ventimiglia railway. A tourist office and bus stop are nearby to reach Èze-Village in a few minutes.

Èze-Village can be reached by train from Nice via the train station Èze-sur-Mer or by bus from Nice. Close to the train station is a bus stop for buses bringing tourists to Èze-Village.

The motto of the village is the phrase Isis Moriendo Renascor (meaning "In death I am Reborn") and its emblem is a phoenix perched on a bone.

The local dialect (nearly extinct) is similar to the Monégasque language of the nearby Principality of Monaco; it is therefore related to Ligurian, but with some influences from the Occitan language.

Èze is one of sixteen villages grouped together by Métropole Nice Côte d'Azur tourist department as the Route des Villages Perchés (Route of Perched Villages). The others are: Aspremont, Carros, Castagniers, Coaraze, Colomars, Duranus, Falicon, La Gaude, Lantosque, Levens, La Roquette-sur-Var, Saint-Blaise, Saint-Jeannet, Tourrette-Levens and Utelle.

== See also ==
- Communes of the Alpes-Maritimes department
