= Saint-Jeannet, Alpes-Maritimes =

Commune in Provence-Alpes-Côte d'Azur, France

Saint-Jeannet Sant Joanet (Occitan)
- Commune
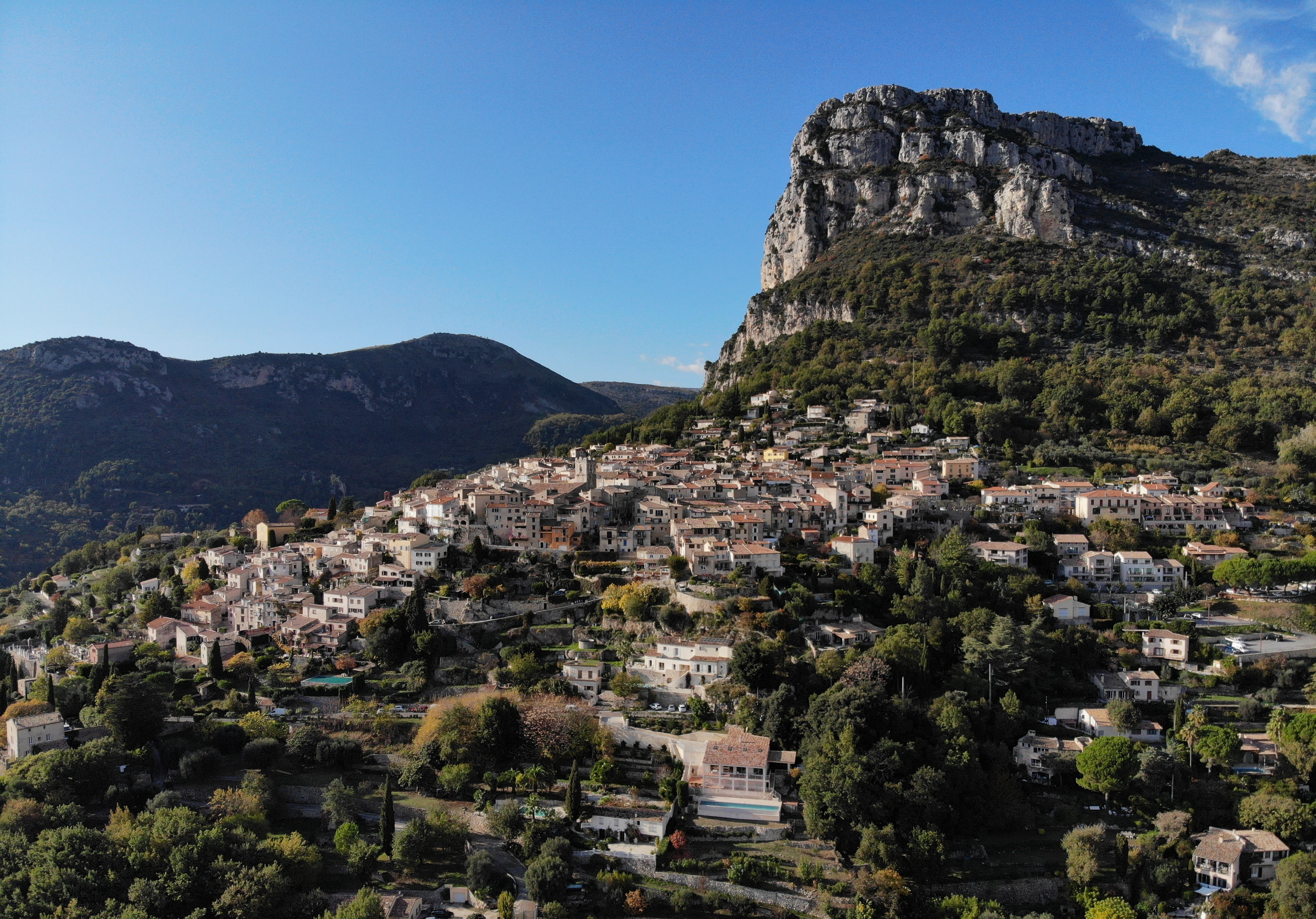
- The old village of Saint-Jeannet

- Coat of arms
- Location of Saint-Jeannet
- Location within France Location within Provence-Alpes-Côte d'Azur
- Coordinates: 43°44′50″N 7°08′38″E
- Country: France
- Region: Provence-Alpes-Côte d'Azur
- Department: Alpes-Maritimes
- Arrondissement: Grasse
- Canton: Vence
- Intercommunality: Métropole Nice Côte d'Azur

Government
  - Mayor (2026–32): Julie Charles
- Area^{1}: 14.58 km^{2} (5.63 sq mi)
- Elevation: 400 m (1,300 ft)
- Highest elevation: 934 m (3,064 ft)
- Lowest elevation: 39 m (128 ft)
- Population (2023): 4,453
  - Density: 305.4/km^{2} (791.0/sq mi)
- Time zone: UTC+01:00 (CET)
  - Summer (DST): UTC+02:00 (CEST)
- INSEE/Postal code: 06122 /06640
- ^{1} French Land Register data, which excludes lakes, ponds, glaciers > 1 km^{2} (0.386 sq mi or 247 acres) and river estuaries.

Saint-Jeannet (French pronunciation: [sɛ̃ ʒanɛ]; Occitan: Sant Joanet) is a hilly commune in the Alpes-Maritimes department in the southeastern Provence-Alpes-Côte d'Azur region in France. Located just northeast of Vence, it is part of the Métropole Nice Côte d'Azur.

In the 10th century, Saint-Jeannet became part of the County of Provence, under the leadership of William I.

== Demographics ==
Historical population

Year	Pop.	±% p.a.
1793	1,024	—
1861	1,156	+0.18%
1911	981	−0.33%
1962	1,079	+0.19%
1968	1,421	+4.70%
1975	1,843	+3.78%
1982	2,436	+4.07%

Year	Pop.	±% p.a.
1990	3,188	+3.42%
1999	3,594	+1.34%
2007	3,645	+0.18%
2012	3,887	+1.29%
2017	4,128	+1.21%
2023	4,453	+1.27%

Source: EHESS and INSEE (1968-2023)

== Tourism ==
Saint-Jeannet is one of sixteen villages grouped together by the Métropole Nice Côte d'Azur tourist department as the Route des Villages Perchés (Route of Perched Villages). The others are: Aspremont, Carros, Castagniers, Coaraze, Colomars, Duranus, Èze, Falicon, La Gaude, Lantosque, Levens, La Roquette-sur-Var, Saint-Blaise, Tourrette-Levens and Utelle.

== See also ==
- Communes of the Alpes-Maritimes department
