= Lantosque =

Commune in Provence-Alpes-Côte d'Azur, France

Lantosque Lantosca (Occitan)
- Commune
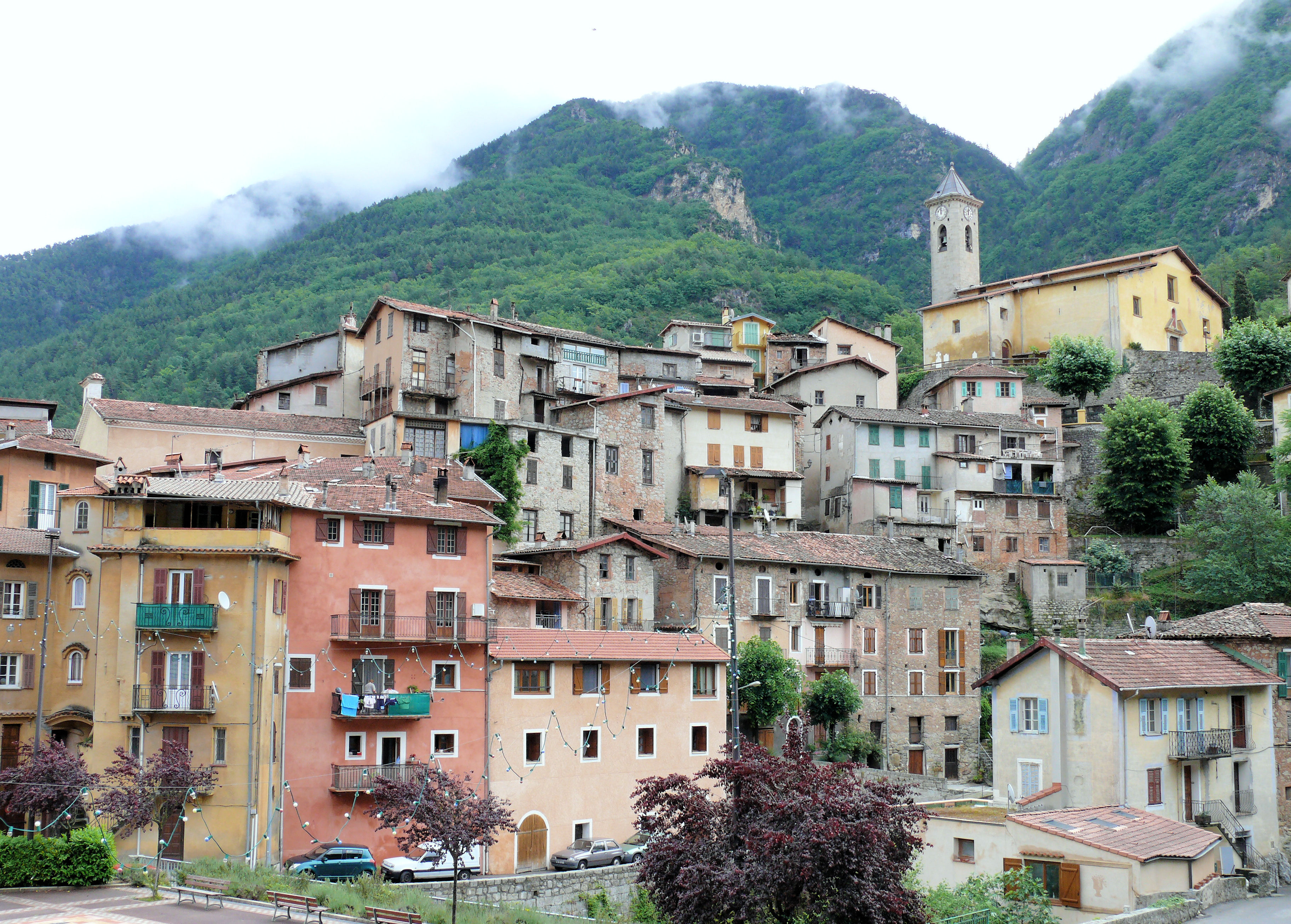
- A view of the village of Lantosque, with the church of Saint-Pons in the upper right

- Coat of arms
- Location of Lantosque
- Location within France Location within Provence-Alpes-Côte d'Azur
- Coordinates: 43°58′28″N 7°18′47″E
- Country: France
- Region: Provence-Alpes-Côte d'Azur
- Department: Alpes-Maritimes
- Arrondissement: Nice
- Canton: Tourrette-Levens
- Intercommunality: Métropole Nice Côte d'Azur

Government
  - Mayor (2026–32): Jean Thaon
- Area^{1}: 44.76 km^{2} (17.28 sq mi)
- Elevation: 512 m (1,680 ft)
- Highest elevation: 2,000 m (6,600 ft)
- Lowest elevation: 335 m (1,099 ft)
- Population (2023): 1,198
  - Density: 26.76/km^{2} (69.32/sq mi)
- Time zone: UTC+01:00 (CET)
  - Summer (DST): UTC+02:00 (CEST)
- INSEE/Postal code: 06074 /06450
- ^{1} French Land Register data, which excludes lakes, ponds, glaciers > 1 km^{2} (0.386 sq mi or 247 acres) and river estuaries.

Lantosque (French pronunciation: [lɑ̃tɔsk]; Italian formerly and Occitan: Lantosca) is a commune in the Alpes-Maritimes department in the Provence-Alpes-Côte d'Azur region in Southeastern France.

Lantosque is one of sixteen picturesque villages grouped together by the Métropole Nice Côte d'Azur tourist office on the Route des Villages Perchés (Route of Perched Villages) itinerary, together with Aspremont, Carros, Castagniers, Coaraze, Colomars, Duranus, Èze, Falicon, La Gaude, Levens, La Roquette-sur-Var, Saint-Blaise, Saint-Jeannet, Tourrette-Levens and Utelle.

== History ==
Lantosque currently has 1,231 inhabitants. In 1848, the commune had 2,573. Four hamlets—Saint-Colomban, Loda, Camari, and Pélasque—along with the main town, make up the Lantosque population. Saint-Colomban (related to Sanctus Colombanus) was founded in the early 7th century. After the Saracen invasions (9th–10th centuries), the power of the Counts of Provence was established over the valley, and the castle of Loda was destroyed by Romée de Villeneuve. In the 9th century, Charlemagne granted the fief to the Abbey of Saint-Pons.

At the beginning of the 13th century, two penitential confraternities emerged in Lantosque, lasting until the 20th century. The most significant was the Black Penitents, whose headquarters was the chapel now located opposite the town hall. However, the White Penitents, known as the Archiconfraternita Didisciplinanti del Presenze Luogo di Lantusca, were also very active. Lantosque was self-governed as a true republic, with autonomy granted by the Counts of Provence. Every year, men elected the Baylo, the head of the commune, assisted by the Sindici, Consiglieri, Arbitri, and Abbati, among others.

The town's notables formed the Minor Council, which appointed the troops required by the Dukes of Savoy when needed, as well as deputies responsible for liaising with Sardinian officials. The salt trade through Levens, Utelle, Lantosque, and the Col de Fenestre toward Piedmont was thriving, benefiting Lantosque from the passage of mule caravans.

In 1271, the lordship was enfeoffed to the Tournefort family, who rebuilt the castle. From the 14th century onward, the community expanded along the ridge beyond the limits of the medieval castrum. In 1388, the Lantosque Valley became one of the vigueries of the County of Nice, which came under Savoyard rule. In 1518, André de Tournefort took possession of the fief, which remained in his family until 1699, when it was purchased by Jean Ribotti. In 1701, Ribotti sold it to Lazare Riccardi from Oneille (now Imperia). Shortly after, Victor Amadeus II of Savoy granted this feudal lord the title of count. During the war between the Duke of Savoy, Charles III, and the King of France, Francis I, in 1542, the village was burned down by the Lord of Ascros. Lantosque suffered several earthquakes in the 15th, 16th, and 17th centuries.

On June 23, 1494, a "horrible earthquake" devastated the villages of Roquebillière and Lantosque. On April 20, 1556, an earthquake completely destroyed Loda and several houses in Lantosque. On July 20, 1564, another earthquake destroyed the village and its church. Emmanuel Philibert later exempted the population from taxes due to their hardship. In 1621, the White Penitents established a hospital to shelter the village's many poor and destitute travelers. In 1630, a plague epidemic struck the town. In 1668, the Saint-Sulpice church was consecrated. In 1698, the White Penitents likely created a Monte Granatico in Saint-Colomban—a type of grain pawnshop that loaned wheat, rye, and barley to farmers in need, with a small repayment in kind. Notably, Lantosque wines were highly valued throughout the valley.

In 1705, the village was plundered by the troops of Louis XIV, with another occupation occurring from 1707 to 1713. During the War of Austrian Succession (1744–1747), when France and Spain fought against Austria and Savoy, the Franco-Spanish troops occupied the county, including Lantosque. In 1792–1793, during the French Revolution and later under the Empire, French troops returned to Lantosque, where intense fighting against the Barbets took place.

Designed by the engineering firm of Armand Considère and Henry Lossier in 1908, the tramway connected Lantosque with other regions. General Garnier noted that, at the time, there were two routes from Lantosque to Nice—one via the Infernet Valley through Lucéram, L’Escarène, and Drap, and another through Figaret, the Saint-Jean bridge, Duranus, Levens, and Aspremont. The first route took 11 hours on horseback, while the second took 12. Travelers could also reach Saorge in five hours via the Col de Raus, Moulinet in two hours, and the Col de Fenestre in three hours.

After the annexation of the County of Nice to France in 1860, the Rivet district experienced significant activity. This area hosted the stagecoach station, stables, hay and straw warehouses, and the “de la Poste” and “Raibaut-Andréani” hotels. The gendarmerie was also headquartered there. The district's decline began with the construction of the tramway line that served the Vésubie from 1909 to 1928.

The first real road passing through Levens and Duranus reached Lantosque in 1863. In 1894, the road between Saint-Jean-La-Rivière and Plan-du-Var was opened. From 1920 to 1940, the presence of military troops in the commune brought relative prosperity, with the construction of military barracks. These barracks also served as the headquarters for the 74th Alpine Fortress Battalion in June 1940. Today, they are no longer used by the French army.

Currently, the village is experiencing a resurgence of population, with new residents moving in from the coastal areas.

== Demographics ==
Historical population
Year	Pop.	±% p.a.
1968	1,057	—
1975	884	−2.52%
1982	772	−1.92%
1990	972	+2.92%
1999	1,019	+0.53%
2007	1,222	+2.30%
2012	1,320	+1.55%
2017	1,312	−0.12%
2023	1,198	−1.50%
Source: INSEE

== Climate ==
On average, Lantosque experiences 42.8 days per year with a minimum temperature below 0 °C (32.0 °F), no days per year with a minimum temperature below −10 °C (14.0 °F), 0.1 days per year with a maximum temperature below 0 °C (32.0 °F), and 43.1 days per year with a maximum temperature above 30 °C (86.0 °F). The record high temperature was 40.1 °C (104.2 °F) on 3 August 2017, while the record low temperature was −9.0 °C (15.8 °F) on 6 February 2012.

Climate data for Lantosque (1991–2020 normals, extremes 2006–present)
Month	Jan	Feb	Mar	Apr	May	Jun	Jul	Aug	Sep	Oct	Nov	Dec	Year
Record high °C (°F)	24.3 (75.7)	23.3 (73.9)	28.9 (84.0)	28.5 (83.3)	34.5 (94.1)	38.6 (101.5)	38.7 (101.7)	40.1 (104.2)	34.3 (93.7)	32.9 (91.2)	26.3 (79.3)	22.7 (72.9)	40.1 (104.2)
Mean daily maximum °C (°F)	11.8 (53.2)	13.1 (55.6)	16.3 (61.3)	19.5 (67.1)	22.2 (72.0)	26.4 (79.5)	29.9 (85.8)	30.6 (87.1)	26.4 (79.5)	21.3 (70.3)	15.4 (59.7)	11.9 (53.4)	20.4 (68.7)
Daily mean °C (°F)	6.3 (43.3)	7.0 (44.6)	9.7 (49.5)	12.8 (55.0)	15.6 (60.1)	19.6 (67.3)	22.4 (72.3)	22.7 (72.9)	19.0 (66.2)	14.9 (58.8)	9.9 (49.8)	6.5 (43.7)	13.9 (57.0)
Mean daily minimum °C (°F)	0.7 (33.3)	0.8 (33.4)	3.0 (37.4)	6.2 (43.2)	9.0 (48.2)	12.8 (55.0)	14.9 (58.8)	14.8 (58.6)	11.6 (52.9)	8.4 (47.1)	4.4 (39.9)	1.1 (34.0)	7.3 (45.2)
Record low °C (°F)	−5.6 (21.9)	−9.0 (15.8)	−3.9 (25.0)	−1.6 (29.1)	1.5 (34.7)	5.9 (42.6)	7.8 (46.0)	7.0 (44.6)	2.1 (35.8)	−1.1 (30.0)	−5.5 (22.1)	−8.0 (17.6)	−9.0 (15.8)
Average precipitation mm (inches)	76.5 (3.01)	61.4 (2.42)	71.5 (2.81)	81.9 (3.22)	77.4 (3.05)	73.4 (2.89)	43.3 (1.70)	39.0 (1.54)	57.8 (2.28)	122.6 (4.83)	148.3 (5.84)	106.2 (4.18)	959.3 (37.77)
Average precipitation days (≥ 1.0 mm)	5.3	5.4	5.8	8.3	9.5	7.5	5.5	4.8	6.1	6.3	7.9	5.9	78.3
Source: Meteociel

== See also ==
- Communes of the Alpes-Maritimes department
