= Métropole Nice Côte d'Azur =

Coordinates: 43.70°N 7.27°E

- Métropole
- Location within the Alpes-Maritimes department
- Country: France
- Region: Provence-Alpes-Côte d'Azur
- Department: Alpes-Maritimes
- No. of communes: {{{nbcomm}}}
- Established: 31 December 2011

Government
  - President (2020–2026): Christian Estrosi (LFA-HOR)
- Area: 1,479.7 km^{2} (571.3 sq mi)
- Population (2018): 545,873
  - Density: 368.91/km^{2} (955.47/sq mi)
- Website: www.nicecotedazur.org

Former logo

The Métropole Nice Côte d'Azur (French pronunciation: [metʁɔpɔl nis kot dazyʁ]) is the métropole, an intercommunal structure, centred on the city of Nice. It is located in the Alpes-Maritimes department, in the Provence-Alpes-Côte d'Azur region, Southeastern France. It was created on 31 December 2011, replacing the previous communauté urbaine of Nice Côte d'Azur and the communautés de communes of Les stations du Mercantour, La Tinée and Vésubie-Mercantour. In 2013 the commune of Coaraze left the métropole; in 2014 the communes of Bonson, Le Broc, Gattières and Gilette joined it. In 2022 the communes of Drap and Châteauneuf-Villevieille joined the métropole. Its area is 1,479.7 km^{2} (571.3 sq mi). Its population was 545,873 in 2018 (including the communes that joined in 2022), of which 341,032 in Nice proper.

== Communes ==
The 51 communes of the métropole are:

1. Aspremont
2. Bairols
3. Beaulieu-sur-Mer
4. Belvédère
5. La Bollène-Vésubie
6. Bonson
7. Le Broc
8. Cagnes-sur-Mer
9. Cap-d'Ail
10. Carros
11. Castagniers
12. Châteauneuf-Villevieille
13. Clans
14. Colomars
15. Drap
16. Duranus
17. Èze
18. Falicon
19. Gattières
20. Gilette
21. La Gaude
22. Ilonse
23. Isola
24. Lantosque
25. Levens
26. Marie
27. Nice
28. Rimplas
29. Roquebillière
30. La Roquette-sur-Var
31. Roubion
32. Roure
33. Saint-André-de-la-Roche
34. Saint-Blaise
35. Saint-Dalmas-le-Selvage
36. Saint-Étienne-de-Tinée
37. Saint-Jean-Cap-Ferrat
38. Saint-Jeannet
39. Saint-Laurent-du-Var
40. Saint-Martin-du-Var
41. Saint-Martin-Vésubie
42. Saint-Sauveur-sur-Tinée
43. La Tour
44. Tournefort
45. Tourrette-Levens
46. La Trinité
47. Utelle
48. Valdeblore
49. Venanson
50. Vence
51. Villefranche-sur-Mer
