= Carros =

Commune in Provence-Alpes-Côte d'Azur, France

- Commune
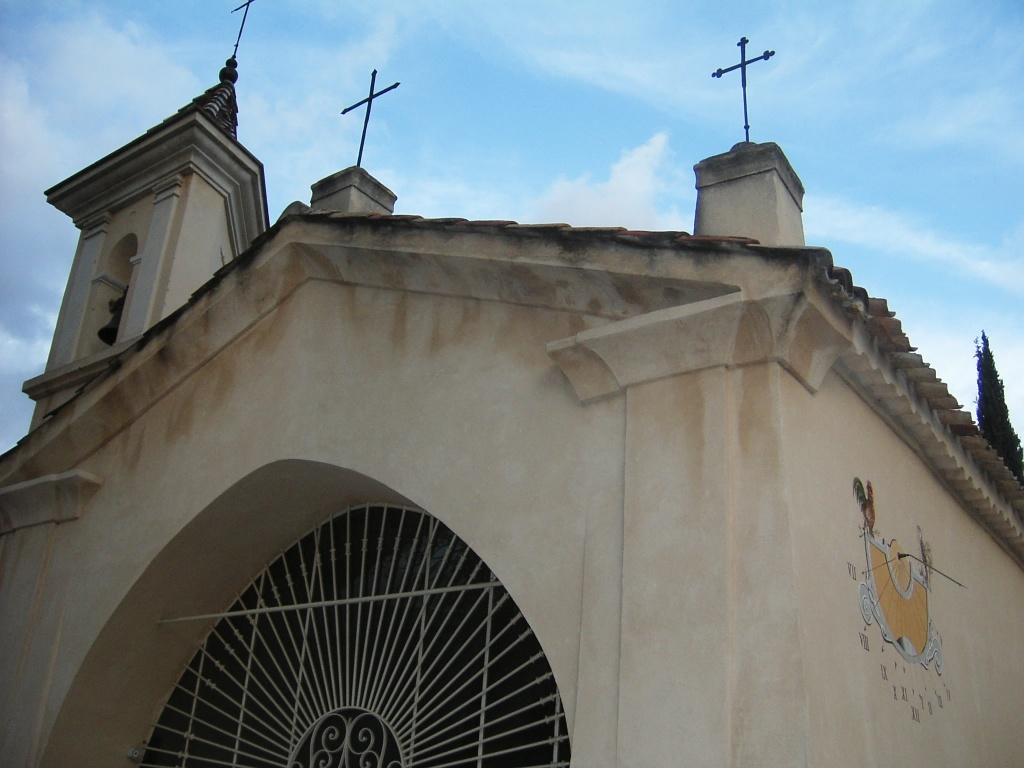
- The chapel of Notre Dame des Selves, in Carros

- Coat of arms
- Location of Carros
- Location within France Location within Provence-Alpes-Côte d'Azur
- Coordinates: 43°47′36″N 7°11′18″E
- Country: France
- Region: Provence-Alpes-Côte d'Azur
- Department: Alpes-Maritimes
- Arrondissement: Grasse
- Canton: Nice-3
- Intercommunality: Métropole Nice Côte d'Azur

Government
  - Mayor (2026–32): Stephane Revello
- Area^{1}: 15.11 km^{2} (5.83 sq mi)
- Elevation: 385 m (1,263 ft)
- Highest elevation: 945 m (3,100 ft)
- Lowest elevation: 63 m (207 ft)
- Population (2023): 13,803
  - Density: 913.5/km^{2} (2,366/sq mi)
- Time zone: UTC+01:00 (CET)
  - Summer (DST): UTC+02:00 (CEST)
- INSEE/Postal code: 06033 /06510
- ^{1} French Land Register data, which excludes lakes, ponds, glaciers > 1 km^{2} (0.386 sq mi or 247 acres) and river estuaries.

Carros (French pronunciation: [kaʁɔs]; Occitan: Carròs) is a commune in the Alpes-Maritimes department in southeastern France. Carros is one of sixteen villages grouped together by the Métropole Nice Côte d'Azur tourist department as the Route des Villages Perchés (Route of Perched Villages). The others are: Aspremont, Castagniers, Coaraze, Colomars, Duranus, Èze, Falicon, La Gaude, Lantosque, Levens, La Roquette-sur-Var, Saint-Blaise, Saint-Jeannet, Tourrette-Levens and Utelle.

== Population ==
The inhabitants are called Carrossois in French.

Historical population

Year	Pop.	±% p.a.
1793	404	—
1800	567	+4.96%
1806	616	+1.39%
1821	748	+1.30%
1838	811	+0.48%
1848	776	−0.44%
1858	818	+0.53%
1861	634	−8.14%
1866	656	+0.68%
1872	606	−1.31%
1876	534	−3.11%
1881	525	−0.34%
1886	512	−0.50%
1891	536	+0.92%
1896	560	+0.88%
1901	443	−4.58%
1906	453	+0.45%

Year	Pop.	±% p.a.
1911	453	+0.00%
1921	390	−1.49%
1926	384	−0.31%
1931	403	+0.97%
1936	509	+4.78%
1946	563	+1.01%
1954	662	+2.05%
1962	761	+1.76%
1968	963	+4.00%
1975	4,197	+23.40%
1982	8,457	+10.53%
1990	10,747	+3.04%
1999	10,710	−0.04%
2007	11,597	+1.00%
2012	11,497	−0.17%
2017	12,329	+1.41%
2023	13,803	+1.90%

Source: EHESS and INSEE (1968-2023)

== See also ==
- Communes of the Alpes-Maritimes department
