= La Gaude =

Commune in Provence-Alpes-Côte d'Azur, France

- Commune
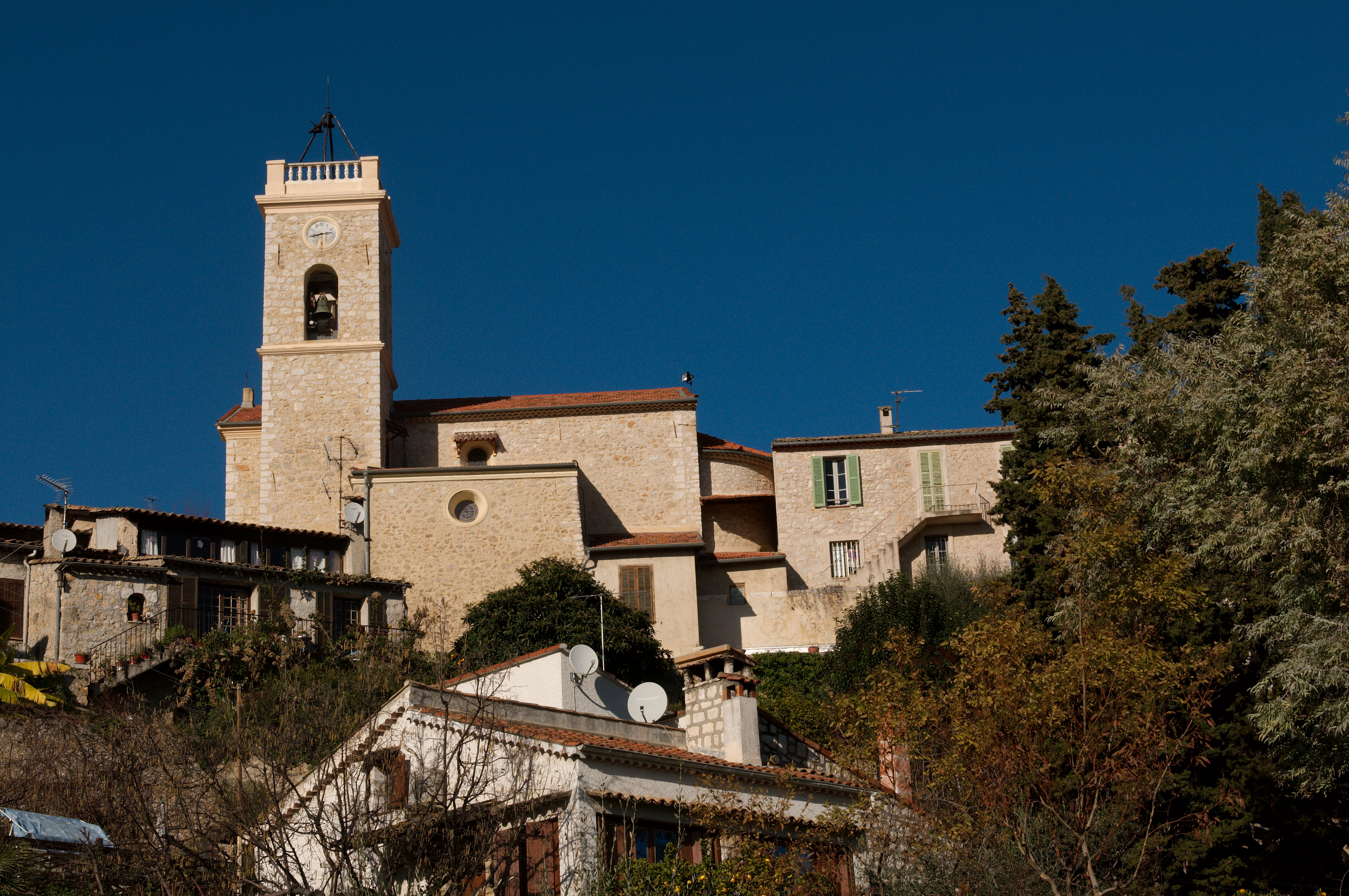
- The church of La Gaude

- Coat of arms
- Location of La Gaude
- Location within France Location within Provence-Alpes-Côte d'Azur
- Coordinates: 43°43′22″N 7°09′13″E
- Country: France
- Region: Provence-Alpes-Côte d'Azur
- Department: Alpes-Maritimes
- Arrondissement: Grasse
- Canton: Cagnes-sur-Mer-2
- Intercommunality: Métropole Nice Côte d'Azur

Government
  - Mayor (2026–32): Bruno Bettati
- Area^{1}: 13.1 km^{2} (5.1 sq mi)
- Elevation: 236 m (774 ft)
- Highest elevation: 349 m (1,145 ft)
- Lowest elevation: 24 m (79 ft)
- Population (2023): 7,265
  - Density: 555/km^{2} (1,440/sq mi)
- Demonym: Gaudois
- Time zone: UTC+01:00 (CET)
  - Summer (DST): UTC+02:00 (CEST)
- INSEE/Postal code: 06065 /06610
- ^{1} French Land Register data, which excludes lakes, ponds, glaciers > 1 km^{2} (0.386 sq mi or 247 acres) and river estuaries.

La Gaude (French pronunciation: [la ɡod]; Occitan: La Gauda) is a commune in the Alpes-Maritimes department in southeastern France.

== History ==
To the south of the village, a restored Roman stele is close to the Aurelian Way, the Roman road that passed near the present cultural centre.

After the Saracen attacks in the ninth century, the inhabitants of the nearby and higher village of Saint-Jeannet descended to the more fertile and less rugged La Gaude area. "La Gauda" is mentioned in 1075. Soon the village was burned for having converted to the Cathar heresy. When the frontier became the nearby River Var, the village was again destroyed.

The village was affected by the plague in the fifteenth century and abandoned until the late sixteenth century. La Gaude became an independent community in 1599, separating from Saint Jeannet. Looting took place in 1704 and for five days in 1707. In the twentieth century, La Gaude was transformed by the arrival of piped water.

The Provençal writer, Marcel Pagnol, was captivated by the village, writing, "I will be back in a fortnight and will rush to your place to admire your barbaric flowers and drink your civilised wine." (« Je reviendrai dans une quinzaine et je m’élancerai chez vous pour admirer vos fleurs barbares et boire votre vin civilisé. ») He bought a property in the village, the domaine de l'Étoile.

The IBM La Gaude research centre (the Centre d'études et de recherches IBM) was established in 1962 in the countryside near La Gaude village. The buildings (architect Marcel Breuer) were listed as historical monument in September 2020.

== Population ==
Historical population
Year	Pop.	±% p.a.
1968	1,631	—
1975	2,309	+5.09%
1982	3,097	+4.28%
1990	4,951	+6.04%
1999	6,170	+2.48%
2007	6,670	+0.98%
2012	6,695	+0.07%
2017	6,623	−0.22%
2023	7,265	+1.55%
Source: INSEE

== Tourism ==
- Perched Villages: La Gaude is one of sixteen villages grouped together by the Métropole Nice Côte d'Azur tourist department as the Route des Villages Perchés (Route of Perched Villages). The others are: Aspremont, Carros, Castagniers, Coaraze, Colomars, Duranus, Èze, Falicon, Lantosque, Levens, La Roquette-sur-Var, Saint-Blaise, Saint-Jeannet, Tourrette-Levens and Utelle.
- Eco-musée Vivant de Provence: Founded by the Danish entomologist and filmmaker Ib Schmedes, the Living Ecomuseum of Provence opened in the 1980s in the Sainte-Appolonie district.
- Chapelle Saint-Ange: Construction of the chapel, dedicated to Saint-Bernardin, was begun in 1844, left until 1873 and completed in 1875. Its last religious service took place in 1913 and it soon fell into ruin until repaired in 1927. From 1949 to 1960 it was used as a cinema. The chapel was restored between 1996 and 2003 by the painter-sculptor Alexis Obolensky and the master glassblower Alain Peinado.

== See also ==
- Communes of the Alpes-Maritimes department
