= Parly 2 =

French shopping center

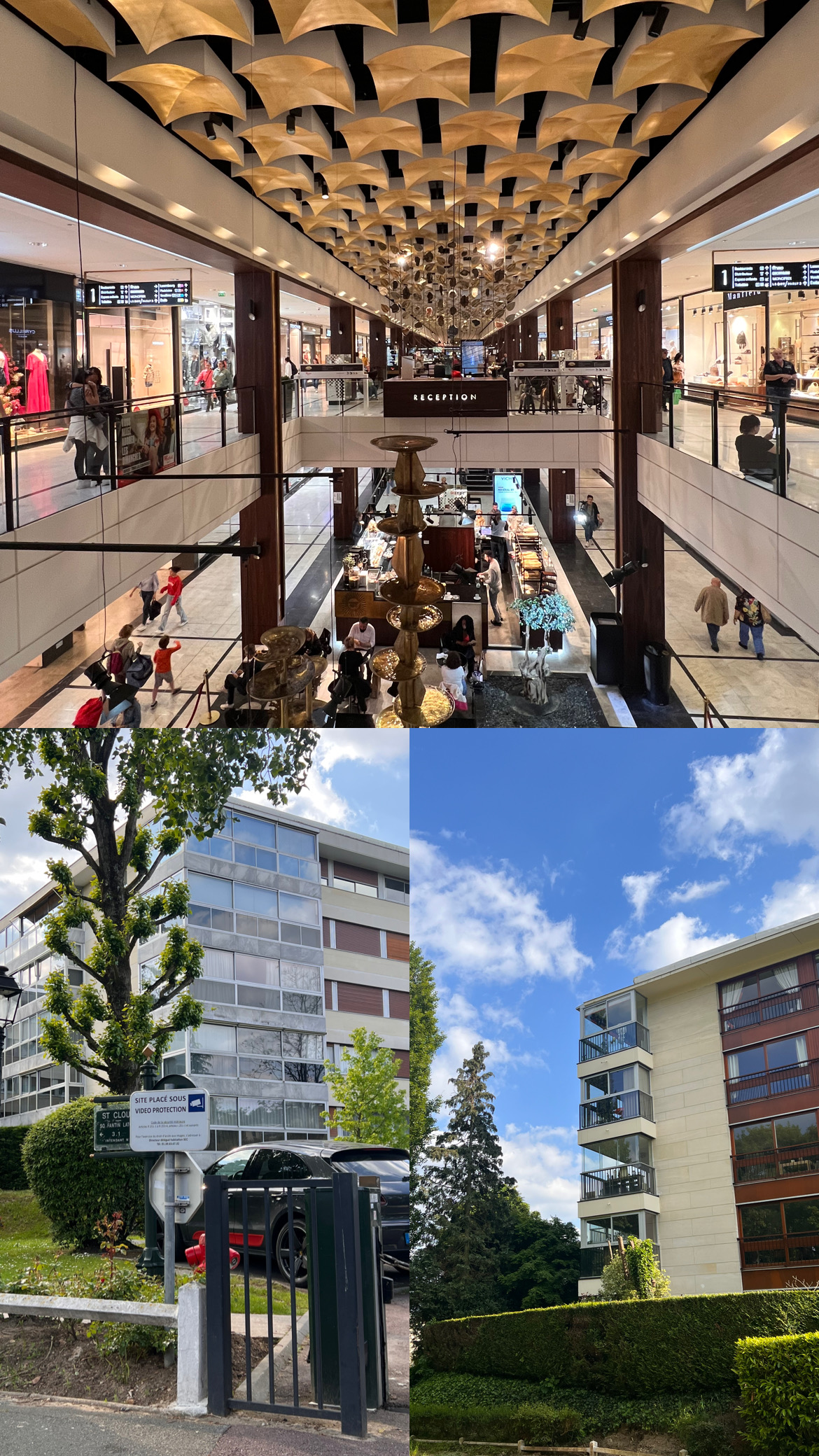
- Location: Le Chesnay, France
- Coordinates: 48.8280°N 2.1162°E
- Address: Westfield Parly 2 513 Centre Commercial Régional Parly 2 78150 Le Chesnay-Rocquencourt France
- Website: www.westfield.com/france/parly2

Parly 2 is a regional shopping mall and residential condominium composed of a French regional shopping center called Westfield Parly 2 as well as a high-end residential real estate complex located in Le Chesnay-Rocquencourt (Yvelines), constituting a single condominium association, the largest in France and Europe.

The shopping center opened on November 4 with 150 shops on 56,000 m^{2}; it is the second shopping center of this size in France, barely two weeks after the opening of Cap 3000 near Nice, in Saint-Laurent-du-Var. Designed to be accessible by cars, it is located near an exit from the A13 and has ample car parks on two and three levels.

== The shopping center ==
Inspired by the Southdale Center built in Minnesota, the shopping center includes a three-level covered gallery with branches of Parisian department stores (Printemps, BHV), numerous shops, and cinemas (opened in 2019). The center offers a complete and diverse commercial offer to meet the needs of customers of Western Paris. It was renamed Westfield Parly 2.

In 1967, the Chesnay-Trianon condominium, also called Parly 2, was built. The largest condominium in Europe includes 7,500 homes for nearly 20,000 inhabitants (the Parlysians) and extends over the new municipality of Chesnay-Rocquencourt. The property developer was Robert Zellinger de Balkany, and the architect was Claude Balick.

In The Consumer Society (1970), the sociologist and philosopher Jean Baudrillard starts from the shopping center to define the "home of consumption as the total organization of everyday life."

On September 18, 2019, the Parly 2 shopping center became Westfield Parly 2.

=== Fittings and renovations ===
==== 1987 : first expansion ====
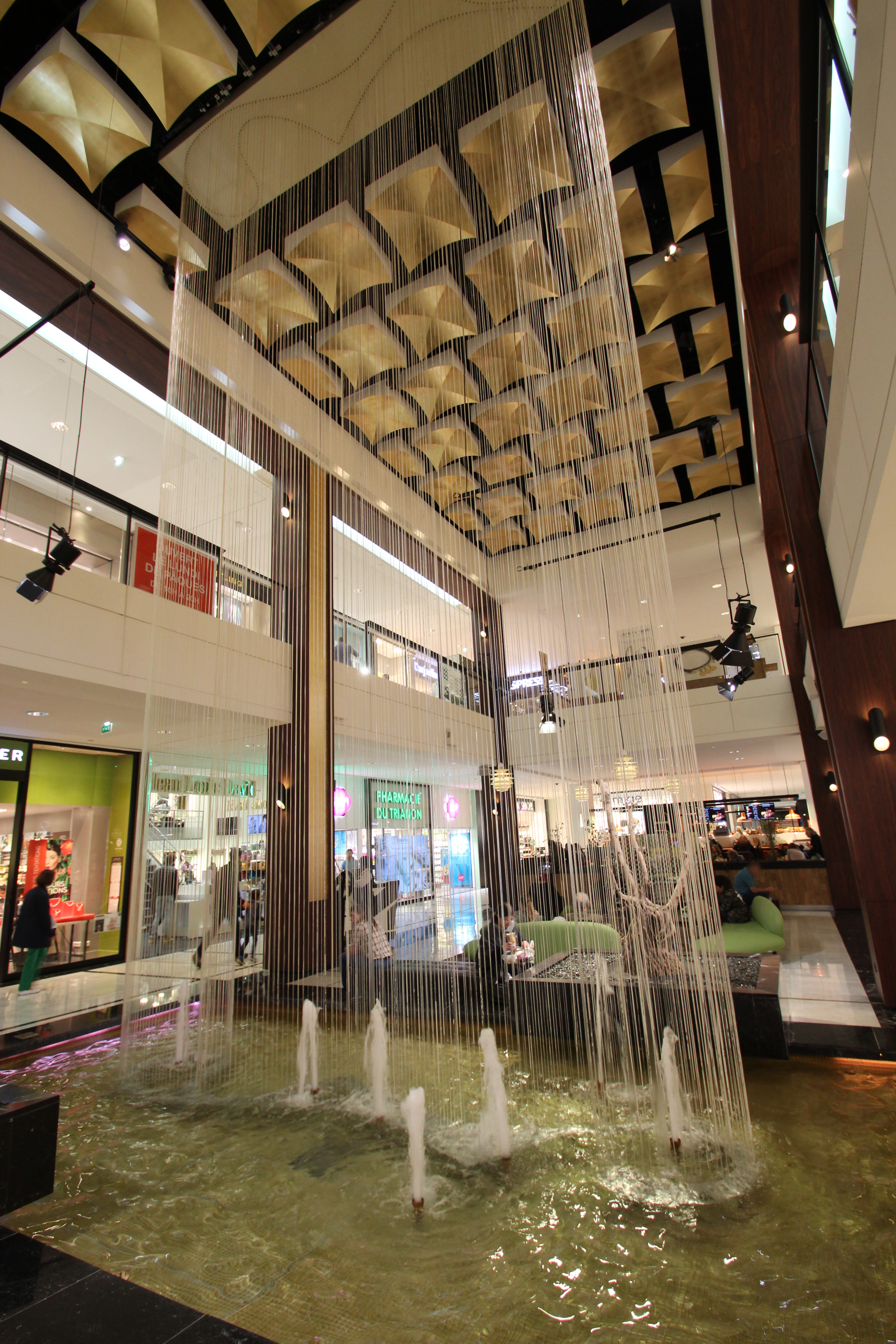
Wire fountains at Westfield Parly 2. Created by Claude Balick.

The center expanded for the first time that year and extended over 107,000 m^{2}. New brands are setting up there, such as Habitat and Truffaut.

==== 2010-2017 : renovation and extension ====
In 2011, the center was renovated by architect designer Olivier Saguez at a cost of 40 million €. In a spirit reminiscent of the 1960s, noble materials are used, in particular Carrara marble, rosewood or mahogany. This renovation earned the designer and Unibail-Rodamco the Grand Prix Stratégies du design 2012.

Between 2011 and 2016, the car parks were restructured.

At the end of 2017, a new passage, called Pont-Neuf, was inaugurated to facilitate the circulation of visitors in the center. This is accompanied by 16 new shops over 3,500 m^{2}. This new mall notably accommodates La Grande Récré over 1,800 m^{2} and Maisons du Monde over 1,000 m^{2}. At the same time, the Monoprix store expanded to 4,090 m^{2} and BHV was renovated, occupying 9,000 m^{2} on three levels.

The cost of all these operations is 200 million € and the new area is 117,000 m^{2}.

=== Attendance ===
In 2012, the center received 13.3 million visitors, 13 million visitors in 2014, 11.4 million in 2017 and 11.5 million in 2018.

=== Logo ===
The Parly 2 logotype changed in 2011. It is now orange.

== Urban planning ==
The urban planning complex built around the shopping center forms with it a real planned community Parly 2.

== Origin of the name ==
The name "Parly 2" has nothing to do with Parly, a town located in the Yonne department and the Bourgogne-Franche-Comté region. The initial name of this real estate operation (1967) was indeed "Paris 2" but had to be changed in the face of opposition from elected Parisians (the comic book Asterix titled The Mansions of the Gods, published shortly after in 1971, directly satirizes this controversy: Julius Caesar refuses to allow a new building complex to be called "Rome II"). The Parly appellation here is the combination of the name of Paris and that of the Forêt de Marly. It was its little sister Elysée 2, succeeding Elysée 1, which launched the first, the fashion for adding the number 2, to an existing place name to baptize new shopping centers or major real estate projects, such as Vélizy 2, Grigny 2, Italie 2, etc.

This condominium has been endowed with a demonym: its residents are the Parlysians.

== Parly 2 Condominium ==
The Parly 2 condominium comprises 36 residential homes which include 278 buildings representing around seven thousand apartments. This real estate complex also includes the following:

- eight swimming pools,
- seven tennis courts,
- underground car parks,
- a church,
- a worship center (Martin-Luther-King Center),
- three playgrounds,
- twenty-nine kiosks in the gardens.

The buildings are surrounded by landscaped gardens, with paths called « square. »

Residences are divided into three types based on their « standing »:

- Type 1 « pleasure of life » : 13 residences or 113 buildings (with five different facades in cut stone and wooden joinery). Type 2 « The intimate art of living » : 18 residences or 151 buildings (with five facades in freestone and wooden joinery). Type 3 « full luxury » : 5 residences or 14 buildings (with a single kind of marble and freestone facade with aluminum joinery).

The residences are distributed in 5 districts.

- 1st district: seven residences, i.e. 57 buildings.
- 2nd district: nine residences, i.e. 52 buildings.
- 3rd district: ten residences, i.e. 90 buildings.
- 4th district: eight residences, i.e. 60 buildings.
- 5th district: two residences, i.e. 19 buildings.

They were built between 1968 and 1978.

The Parly 2 residences had lent their setting to many films, including Creezy (1974), with Alain Delon, When I Was a Singer (2006) with Gérard Depardieu or Harry, He's Here to Help (2000) by Dominik Moll. The actor Sim has long occupied an entire floor of the Palais-Royal residence.

== See also ==
=== Bibliography ===
- Camille Meyer-Léotard (2010). Si Parly m'était conté... Paris: Textuel. p. 143. ISBN 978-2-84597-404-3.
- Commerce

=== Related articles ===
- Trade
- List of shopping centers in Île-de-France
- List of the largest shopping centers in France

=== Externals Links ===
- Official website of Parly 2 shopping center.
- PARLY 2 ou l’American west of life French radio documentary in the program La Fabrique de l'histoire in France Culture.
- Official website of the Parly 2 residential complex
