= List of Unibail-Rodamco-Westfield properties =

The following is a list of properties owned by Unibail-Rodamco-Westfield, a European commercial real estate company with assets in Europe and North America. Their portfolio includes a number of Westfield-branded shopping centres in the United Kingdom and United States that were originally owned by the Westfield Group, and spun-off into the Westfield Corporation in 2014 before merging with Unibail-Rodamco in 2018. From September 2019, Unibail-Rodamco-Westfield will introduce the Westfield brand to eight operating flagship properties with two properties under development.

== Europe ==
=== Austria ===
- Westfield Donau Zentrum
- Westfield Shopping City Süd

=== Czech Republic ===
- Westfield Černy Most
- Metropole Zilčín
- Westfield Chodov

=== Denmark ===
- Fisketorvet

=== France ===
- 29 rue du port
- Aéroville
- Alma
- Les Ateliers Gaîté
- Carrousel du Louvre
- Confluence
- Espace Champerret
- Hôtel Salomon de Rothschild
- Lightwell
- Palais de Congrès de Paris
- Paris Le Bourget
- Paris Expo Porte de Versailles
- Paris Villepinte
- So Ouest
- Toison d'Or
- Tour Rosny
- Triangle (under development)
- Trinity
- Les Salles du Carrousel
- Le Sextant
- Ulis 2
- L'Usine Mode et Maison
- Les Villages de l'Arche
- Westfield Carré Sénart
- Westfield CNIT
- Westfield Euralille
- Westfield Forum des Halles
- Westfield Parly 2
- Westfield La Part-Dieu
- Westfield Les Quatre Temps
- Westfield Rosny 2
- Westfield Vélizy 2

=== Germany ===
- Höfe am Brühl
- Minto
- Paunsdorf Center
- Westfield Centro
- Westfield Hamburg-Überseequartier
- Westfield Ruhr Park

=== Netherlands ===
- Stadshart Amstelveen
- Westfield Mall of the Netherlands

=== Poland ===
- Centrum Ursynów
- Wileńska
- Wroclavia
- Złote Tarasy
- Westfield Arkadia
- Westfield Mokotów

=== Spain ===
- Garbera (under development)
- La Vaguada
- Splau
- Westfield Glòries
- Westfield La Maquinista
- Westfield Parquesur

=== Sweden ===
Metropolitan area ("metro")	Suburb or Neighborhood	Name/Location/Notes	Size	Anchor tenants	Acquired	Opened
Greater Stockholm	Nacka	Nacka Forum	240,000 m^{2} (2,583,339 sq ft)		2019	1989
Greater Stockholm	Solna	Westfield Mall of Scandinavia	101,048 m^{2} (1,087,672 sq ft)	Åhléns	2019	2015
Greater Stockholm	Täby	Westfield Täby Centrum	78,000 m^{2} (839,585 sq ft)	Illums Bolighus, Åhléns	2022	1968

=== United Kingdom ===
Metropolitan area ("metro")	Suburb or Neighborhood	Name/Location/Notes	Size	Anchor tenants	Acquired	Opened
Greater London	White City	Westfield London	240,000 m^{2} (2,583,339 sq ft)	John Lewis, Marks & Spencer, Vue International, Waitrose	2008	2008
Greater London	Stratford	Westfield Stratford City	175,000 m^{2} (1,883,684 sq ft)	John Lewis, Marks & Spencer	2011	2011
Edinburgh	New Town	St James Quarter	79,000 m^{2} (850,349 sq ft)	John Lewis	2026	2021

== North America ==
=== United States ===
Metropolitan area ("metro")	Suburb or Neighborhood	Name/Location/Notes	Size	Anchor tenants	Acquired	Opened
New York	Paramus	Westfield Garden State Plaza	2,118,718 sq ft (196,835 m^{2})	AMC Theatres, Macy's, Neiman Marcus, Nordstrom	1986	1957
Los Angeles	Canoga Park	Westfield Topanga	1,588,050 sq ft (147,535 m^{2})	AMC Theatres, Macy's, Nordstrom, Target, Topanga Social	1993	1964
Washington	Bethesda	Westfield Montgomery	1,223,475 sq ft (113,665 m^{2})	AMC Theatres,Macy's, Nordstrom	1993	1968
Washington	Wheaton	Westfield Wheaton	1,700,000 sq ft (157,935 m^{2})	Costco, Dick's Sporting Goods, JCPenney, Macy's, Target	1997	1960
San Diego	University City	Westfield UTC	1,066,842 sq ft (99,113 m^{2})	AMC Theatres, Macy's, Nordstrom	1998	1977
San Francisco Bay	San Jose	Westfield Valley Fair	2,200,000 sq ft (204,387 m^{2})	Bloomingdale's, Eataly, Nordstrom, Macy's	1998	1986
Los Angeles	Culver City	Westfield Culver City	1,061,687 sq ft (98,634 m^{2})	JCPenney, Macy's, Target	1998	1975
Chicago	Skokie	Westfield Old Orchard	1,582,295 sq ft (147,000 m^{2})	Bloomie's, CMX, Macy's, Nordstrom	2002	1956
Los Angeles	Century City	Westfield Century City	1,300,000 sq ft (120,774 m^{2})	AMC Theatres, Bloomingdale's, Macy's, Nordstrom	2002	1964
Los Angeles	Sherman Oaks	Westfield Fashion Square	850,000 sq ft (78,968 m^{2})	Bloomingdale's, Macy's	2002	1962
Sacramento	Roseville	Westfield Galleria at Roseville	1,300,000 sq ft (120,774 m^{2})	Cinemark, JCPenney, Macy's, Nordstrom, Round1	2002	2000
Seattle	Tukwila	Westfield Southcenter	1,682,961 sq ft (156,352 m^{2})	AMC Theatres, JCPenney, Macy's, Nordstrom	2002	1968
New York	New York City	Westfield World Trade Center The property is managed by Unibail-Rodamco-Westfield, but owned by the Port Authority of New York and New Jersey.	365,000 sq ft (33,910 m^{2})	Eataly	2016	2016

== See also ==
- List of Westfield shopping centres
- List of Scentre Group properties
