= Cap 3000 =

French shopping center

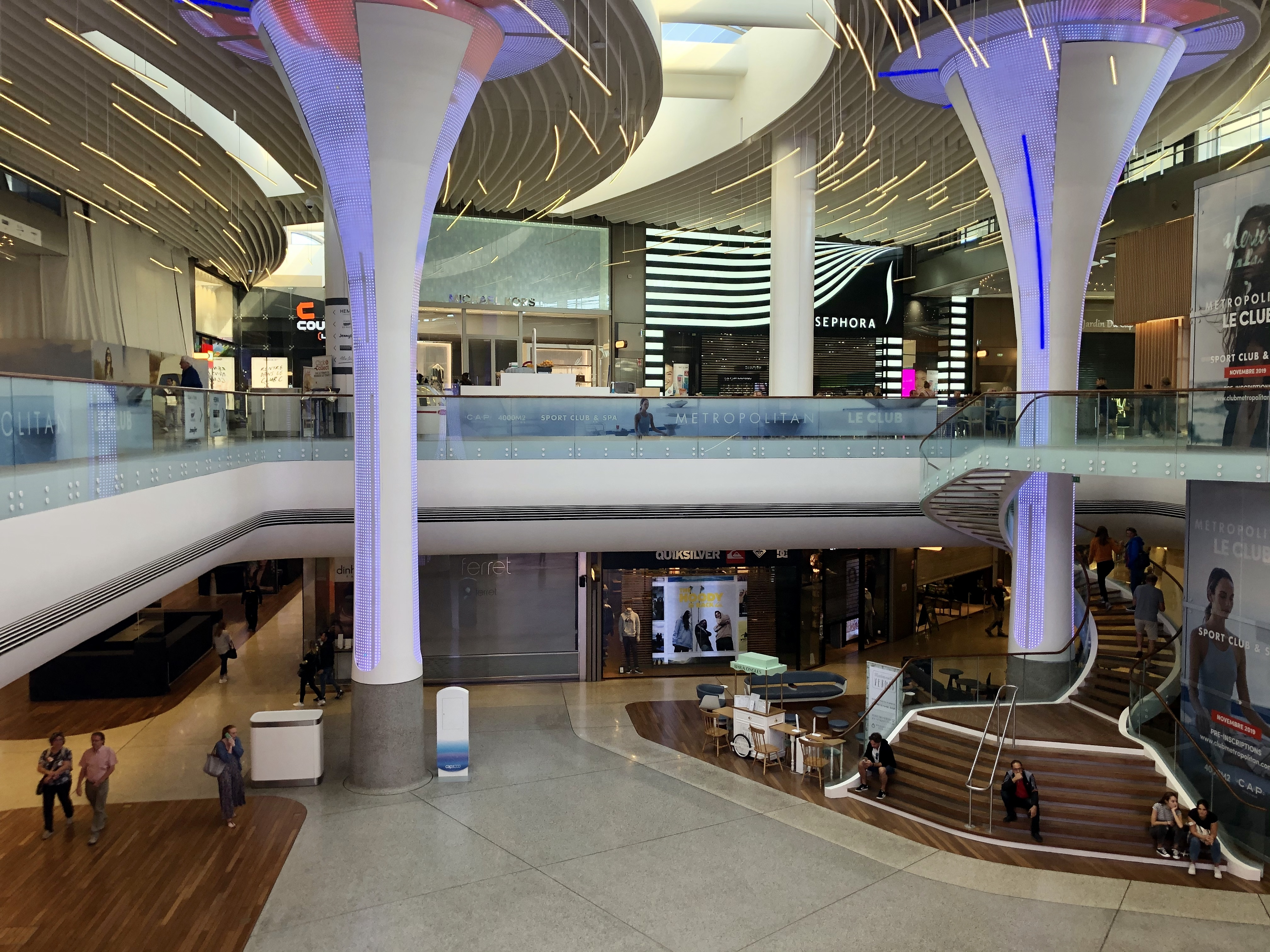
- Location: Saint-Laurent-du-Var, France
- Coordinates: 43°39′33″N 7°11′50″E
- Address: CAP3000 06700 Saint-Laurent-du-Var France
- Website: en.cap3000.com

Cap 3000 is a French shopping center in the suburbs of Nice, in the city of Saint-Laurent-du-Var. Opened in 1969, it is one of the largest shopping centers in the Alpes-Maritimes, the one with the largest number of shops (300 in 2021), and was one of the busiest. In February 2021, it was the fifth largest shopping center in France by useful commercial area with 135,000 m^{2}.

Even though this regional mall is in a mid-to-high range, it is a popular meeting place, from locals to wealthy foreign tourists. The shopping center has large retail and service stores, boutiques, restaurants, medical offices and medical analysis laboratories.

== History ==
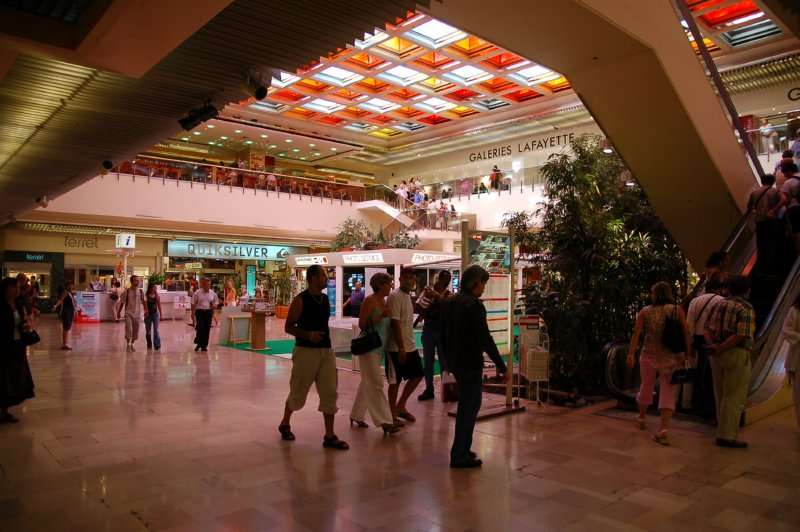
The central hall in 2006.

It was towards the end of the 1960s that Jean Demogé, PDG of Nouvelles Galeries, had the idea of building a large shopping center near Nice-Côte d'Azur airport. The location corresponds to a vast wetland on the banks of the Var, well served by communication routes. When it opened on October 21, 1969, the center was modern, ahead of its time, and inspired by the American shopping centers of the time. Thus, the centre's first promotional brochure states: « Cap 3000 is a living center where, in a pleasant atmosphere, dreams and relaxation mingle with the necessities of everyday life ».

The name of the center is the abbreviation of capacity 3,000 places, in reference to the number of parking spaces. The shopping center is the first of this size in France, and is followed by the opening two weeks later of Parly 2. It initially consisted of fifty-two stores surrounding the New Galleries on two levels, and was air-conditioned. Cap 3000 then had approximately 2,000 employees.

=== Facilities ===
==== Extensions ====
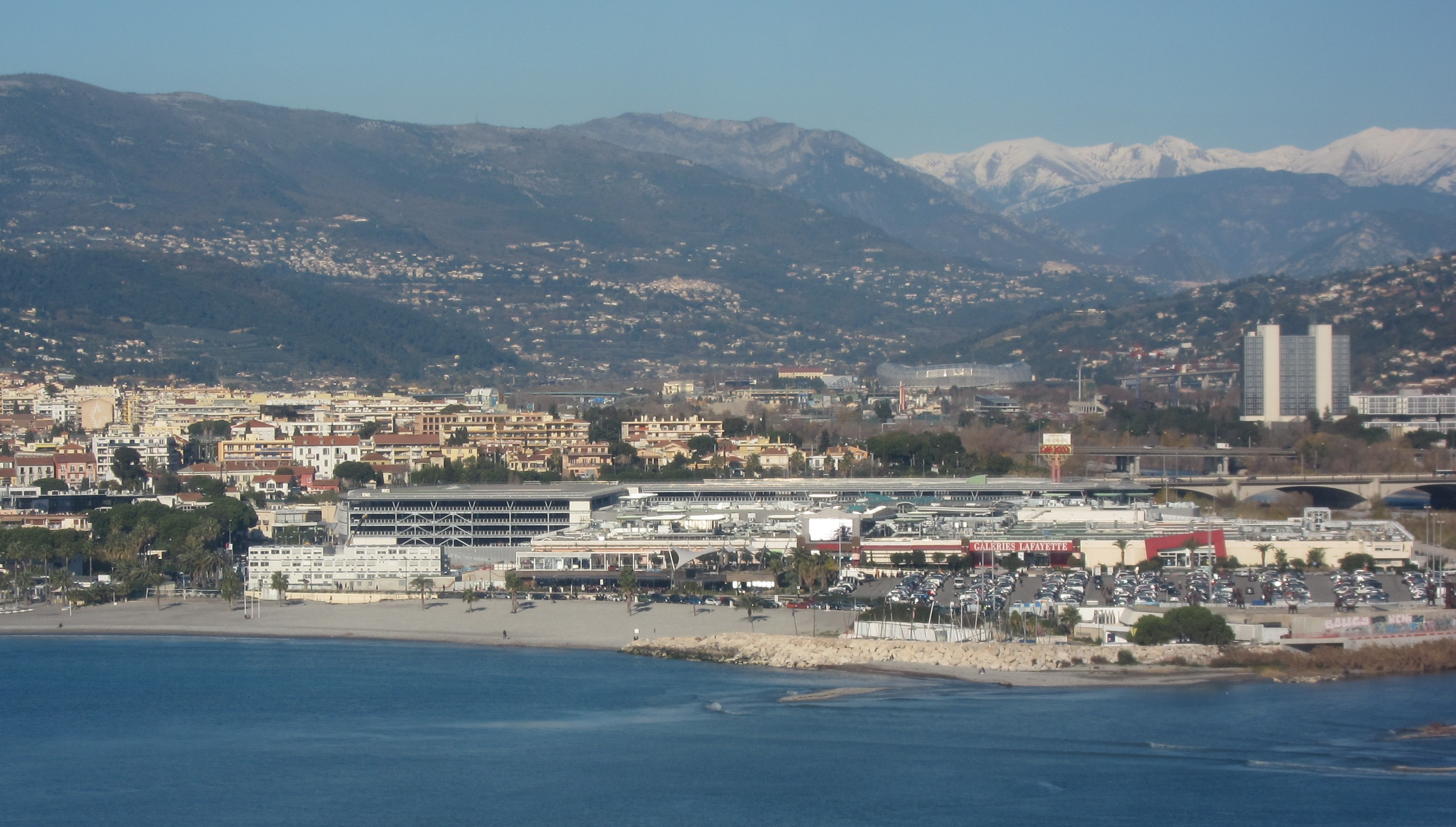
General view of the mall in December 2016.

Cap 3000 subsequently benefited from three extensions: in 1979 on the upstairs terraces, in 1989 on the ground floor and in 1996. For fifteen years, any extension of the shopping center was blocked due to the classification of the land where it was located in a flood zone after the centennial flood of the Var in 1994. A doubling of the car park was notably envisaged. In 2007, the center financed the reinforcement of the nearest dike. Other work is being carried out so that Cap 3000 is sufficiently protected for extensions to be legally feasible. The town hall of Saint-Laurent-du-Var completed these projects in 2012.

==== 2015–2021: extension and renovation ====
In November 2014, Altarea presented the shopping center renovation and expansion project. The surface should increase to 135,000 m^{2}, the number of shops to 300 and parking spaces to 4,800. The cost of the extension-renovation is estimated between 400 and 450 million €.

In August 2015, the center inaugurated the first part of the new parking silo with 1,400 spaces. These are the renovation works of its initial area which will be completed in 2016. Parking becomes chargeable beyond three hours of parking unless purchases over 50 € or five hours for « loyalty members ».

In April 2017, the extension created on the north side was completed and welcomed new shops. The south side extension is open to the public from November 2019. In July 2021, the last extension located on the west side, on the first level, was inaugurated: an 8,000 m^{2} wing, called “Corso” and dedicated to luxury brands and designers. This extension puts an end to the renovation and extension project undertaken in 2014 by Altarea, the total cost of which amounts to 650 million €.

At the same time, the town hall of Saint-Laurent-du-Var is developing new access to the center, urban renewal and amenities in the nearby avenues and streets.

== Features ==
The Cap 3000 shopping center is built on the seafront on a plot of 134,196 m^{2}. This area includes the car parks and the building. In August 2021, the latter comprises 282 shops on four levels. The useful commercial surface of Cap 3000 was in February 2021, 135,000 m^{2}, which makes it the fifth largest shopping center in France from this point of view and the second outside the Paris region.

Before its renovation in 2016, the building had six entrances on the ground floor (two to the North, three to the West, one to the East) and one entrance to the first floor (to the South), overlooking the edge of sea. Since its renovation, the number of entrances is four on the ground floor (two to the North, two to the West) and three on the first floor (to the South). Communication between the two levels is via a large central hall and an escalator located in a space called the ground floor.

The center has a nursery area, a play area, a free area offering entertainment for children for 1.5 hours, a cloakroom area, a Lignes d'Azur service on transport, a free helmet locker, a concierge.

As of autumn 2018, the car parks have 3,500 parking spaces, including 50 electric vehicle spaces, 72 PRM spaces and 214 carpooling spaces. They are located on the north and west sides of the center, on three superstructure levels. Since September 5, 2018, the Cityscoot company has been offering locations dedicated to self-service electric scooter rental. The construction of pontoons will also allow pleasure boats to dock as close as possible to the centre At the end of the renovation of the center between 2015 and 2021, the number of parking spaces amounted to 4,200.

In 2009, approximately 2,400 people worked there. After the end of the extension started in 2015, the center had around 4,000 employees, making it one of the largest employers in the department.

The Galeries Lafayette have been the anchor tenant of Cap 3000 from the start. In 2010, Apple opened its first store in the department in the center, as did Starbucks in 2012. In December 2020, the largest pharmacy in Europe at that date opened its doors with a surface area of 3,500 m^{2}, including 2,500 m^{2} of sales area.

Forty luxury, premium and designer brands (such as Maison Christian Dior, Fauchon, Maison Ladurée, Chocolat Alain Ducasse) are grouped together in the "Corso" wing over 8,000 m^{2} located to the west of the building, on the first level. This wing, which offers a view of the sea, is in the shape of curves supposed to recall « the movements and reflections of water ». It has a high ceiling, which lets in natural light, its floor is in venetian glass, and it contains decorative elements in Murano glass and brass.

== Management ==
Originally, Cap 3000 was owned by Nouvelles Galeries, then by Galeries Lafayette. Shortly before its takeover in 2010, Cap 3000 was managed by Citynove Asset Management, a wholly owned subsidiary of the Groupe Galeries Lafayette. Since May 30, 2008, it has been owned by Aldeta, a listed land company, a subsidiary of the Groupe Galeries Lafayette, which owns and operates the assets of Cap 3000.

In February 2010, the daily La Tribune announced that the Groupe Galeries Lafayette was seeking to sell Cap 3000. The operation would not call into question the presence of the group's brands within the centre. It would be done by invitation to tender and about fifteen companies would be interested in this acquisition. On May 7, 2010, Cap 3000 was finally sold for 450 million € to a consortium called Altablue, led by Altarea, a specialized property company, associated with ABP, a Dutch pension fund, and Predica, the insurance subsidiary people from Crédit Agricole Assurances.

== Economic performance ==
In 2009, Cap 3000's turnover reached 340 million €, which placed it in eighth place in France. The rate of effort is around 9%. In 2010, it was 366 million €. In 2013, the turnover was 412 million €. As far as the yield per square meter is concerned, Cap 3000 is one of the top five French shopping centers, indicates Nice-Matin in October 2009. The yield in 2010 was 11,000 € per square meter per year.

At the beginning of 2022, the average customer basket (excluding the « Corso » wing dedicated to luxury) is estimated at 100 € by the shopping center. That of the customers of « Corso », a space above all intended for foreign customers, is estimated at an amount of 400 to 500 €.

== Attendance ==
In 2009 and 2010, Cap 3000 had eight million visitors.

In 2013, 2015 and 2019, it was estimated at 10 million. During the COVID-19 pandemic in 2020 and 2021, a period during which the center closed its doors for just over 3 months a year, attendance dropped to 7.5 million annual visitors.

== Location and access ==
Cap 3000 is located on the right bank of the Var, river mouth, near the city center of Saint-Laurent-du-Var. It is bordered by the Var, the shore of the Mediterranean Sea and the seaside road. The main access routes are the A8 autoroute, the departmental road D 6007 (formerly RN 7), the seaside road, and the Flots-Bleus promenade from the port of Saint-Laurent-du-Var. Nice-Côte d'Azur Airport is nearby, on the opposite bank of the Var.

A bus stop serves the shopping center. Several bus lines from the Lignes d'Azur public transport network pass through it. In December 2019, these are buses 12, 20, 22, 54, 55, 73, 217, 232 and 706. Finally, about a ten-minute walk from Cap 3000 is the Saint-Laurent-du-Var station. This hosts the TER Provence-Alpes-Côte d'Azur which serves the main cities of the Riviera coast.

== Reward ==
Cap 3000 was voted the best shopping center in the world during the MIPIM Awards 2022 competition.

== See also ==
- Official website
