= Decré =

French department store

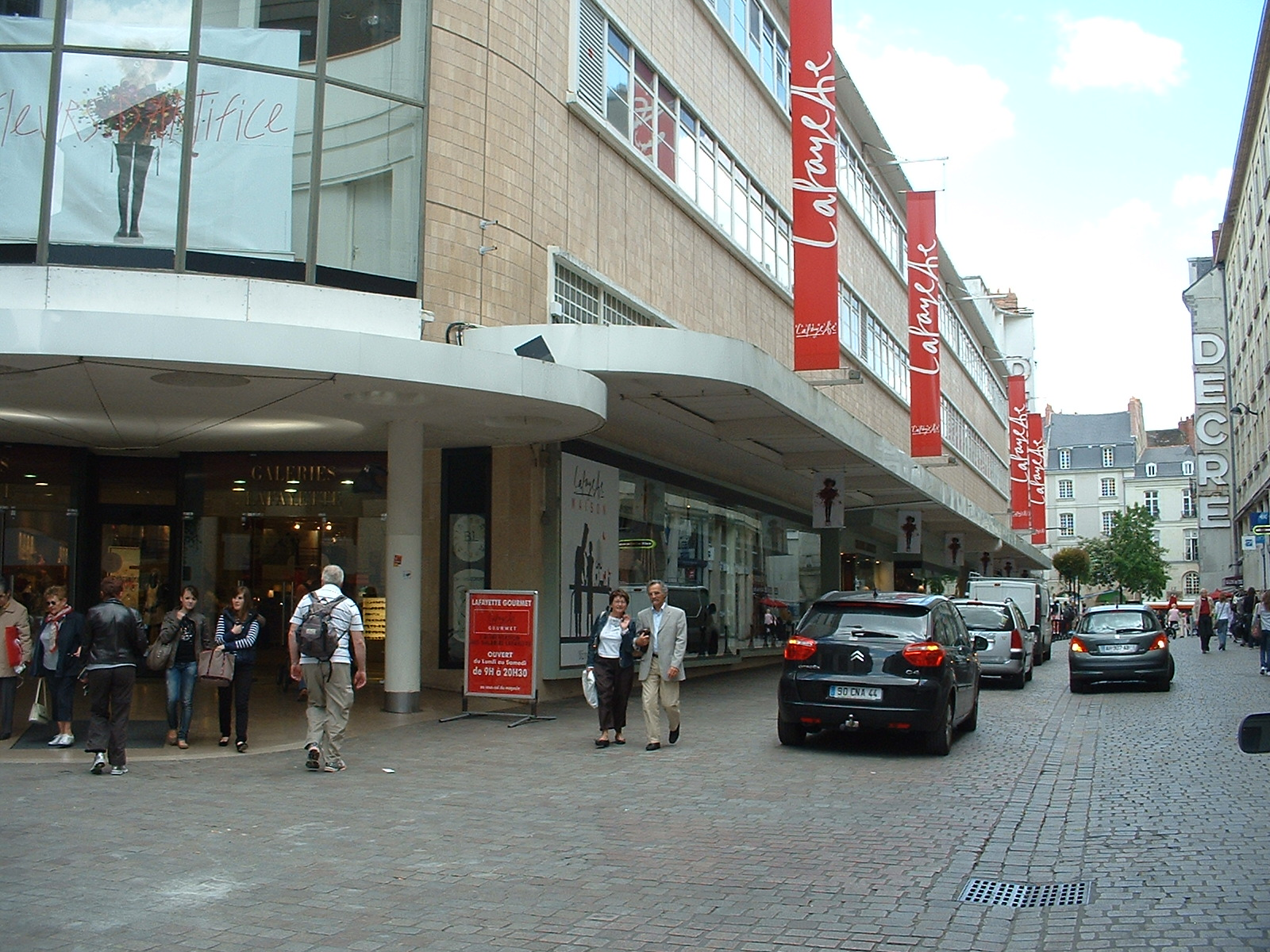
- 47°12′57″N 1°33′14″W
- Location: France
- Type: Department store
- Opening date: 1948

Decré, named after the large family of merchants who founded it, is the first department store in the city of Nantes. When its new building opened in 1931 it was the largest in Europe. This store, rebuilt after the Second World War, today bears the Galeries Lafayette brand.

== Location ==
Located in the Bouffay district in the city center, its address is 2–20, rue de la Marne, the road on which most of the facade of the building is located. The main entrance is at the corner of it and rue du Moulin. There is also a service entrance at 5, rue de Briord.

== History ==
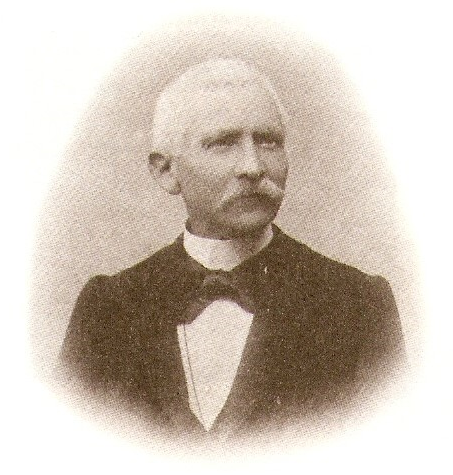
Jules Decré.

It was in 1857 that a young Mayenne native of Jublains, aged 23, Jules-César Decré came to settle in Nantes and was hired as an employee of Madame Motté's Grand Bazaar, located rue du Calvaire. After ten years, in 1867, the young man opened his own store under the name of Bazar Decré, located at n°6 on Basse-Grand-Rue (current rue de la Marne), at the corner of rue du Mill. Jules-César Decré bought the building in 1898, then over the years, the store expanded by purchasing numerous surrounding businesses, totaling an area of 6,000 m^{2}.

In 1869 he married Eugénie Poster, a sales employee, with whom he had two sons: Eugène (born 13 March 1870) and Jules (born 2 February 872).

Later, Jules-César Decré involved his two sons in business management, then took a step back after the death of his wife, in 1907. The Bazar Decré became Decré-Frères with the arrival of this second generation of entrepreneurs at the head of a business that increasingly resembles a department store. However, the First World War broke out, Eugène and Jules went to the front as reserve officers. The father then temporarily takes over the reins of the business, helped by his daughters-in-law and two of his grandsons, Émile and Jean, aged under twenty. Jules-César Decré died three years after resuming his activities.

Once peace had returned, the business was taken over by a collective made up of Jules' three sons - Emile, Jean and Paul Decré - helped by their brother-in-law Jean Lauprêtre. Gradually the third generation continues to develop and innovate: publication of a catalog, implementation of home deliveries, launch of a food section, etc. In 1930 the Decré brothers created the « Decré Purchasing Company » in Paris, which later became the Purchasing Group of Independent Department Stores (« Gagmi »), which was at the origin of one hundred and thirty hypermarkets, including those by Marcel Fournier, brothers Denis and Jacques Defforey, co-founders of the Carrefour Group.

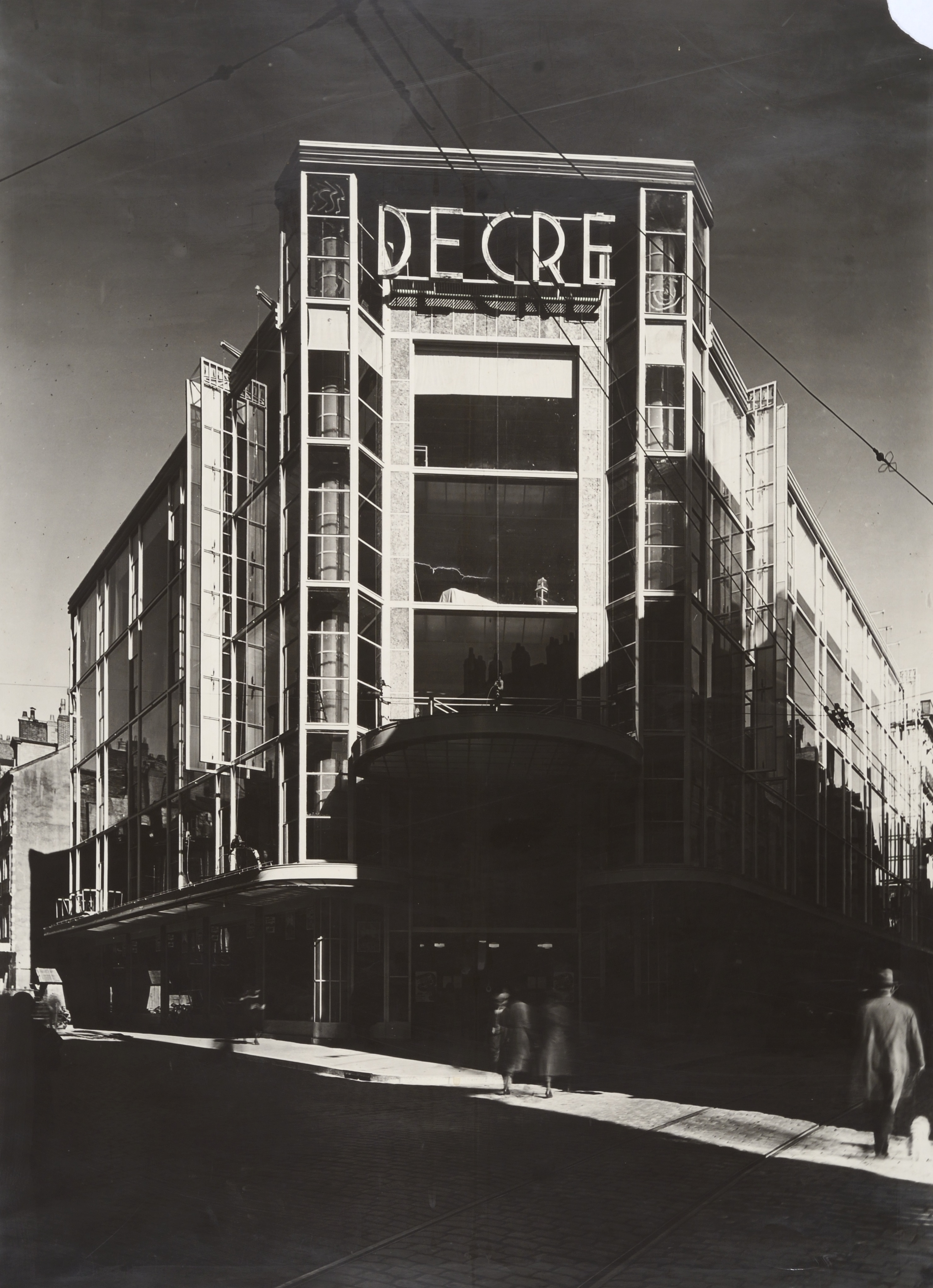
Department stores Decré in 1931.

The Decré are also involved in associations and the life of the city: Christian employers, Rotary, tourist union, scouting, etc. Business was booming, and the family always thought bigger: in 1931, they inaugurated in Nantes what was then the largest store in Europe, designed by architects Henri Sauvage, Louis-Marie Charpentier and Charles Friesé. Seven floors of glass and steel, which accommodate two restaurants, a terrace, a hairdressing salon, a 300-seat movie theater, a puppet theater, a travel agency, a post office, etc. In 1934, they also launched Frigécrème ice cream.

But the Second World War broke out and the store was completely destroyed by the bombing of 23 September 1943. Less than a week after the disaster, sales resumed in a temporary store on rue de Briord. In 1947, reconstruction work began and a first phase was opened six years, to the day, after the fatal bombing. The architects Louis-Marie Charpentier, Charles Friesé and the latter's wife Victoire Durand-Gasselin, were once again asked to draw up plans for the new store which was inaugurated in 1951. The upper terrace was converted into a restaurant in 1953.

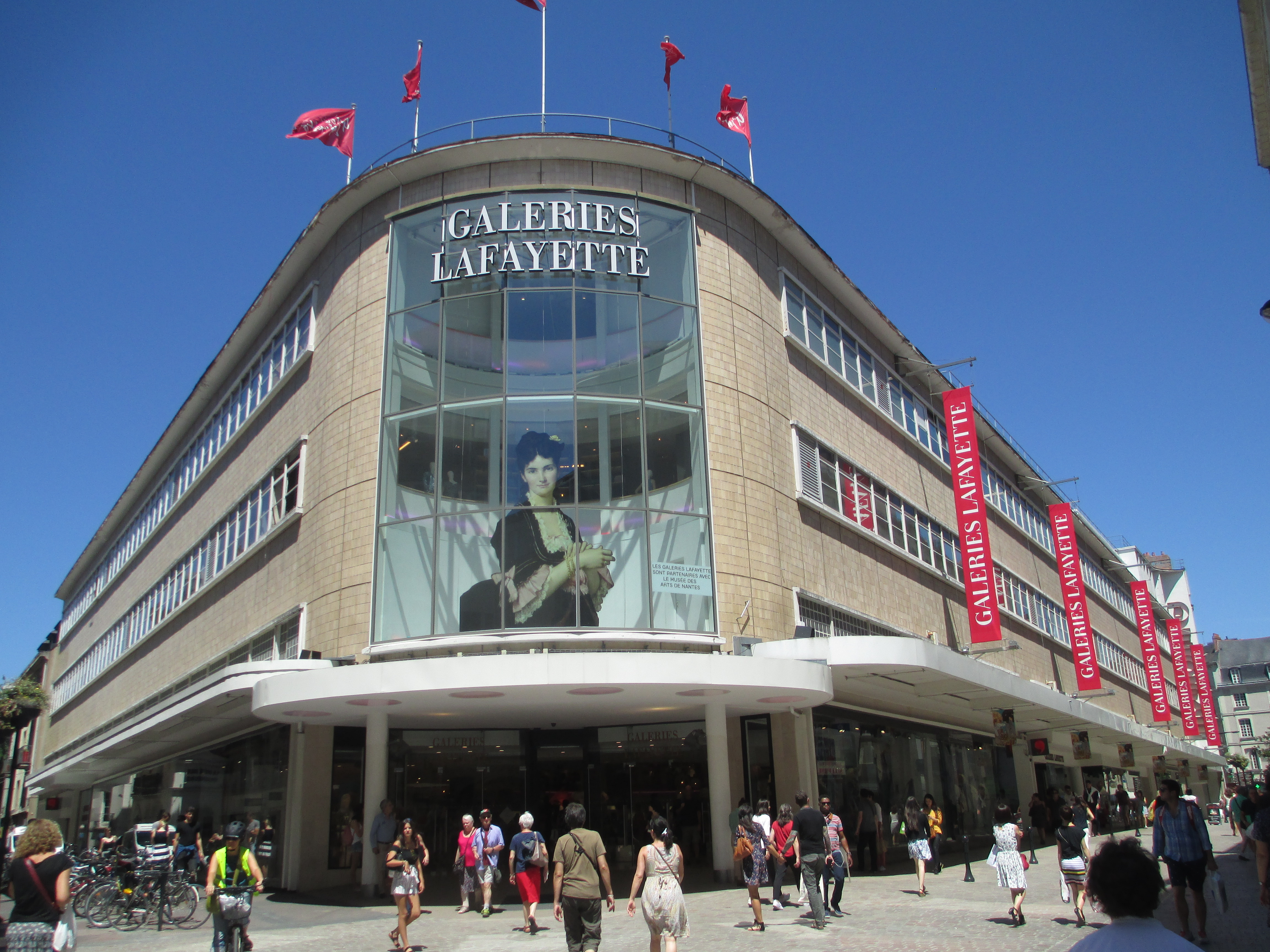
The Decré department stores, which have since become Galeries Lafayette.

After the war, the new generation, that of Julius Caesar's great-grandchildren: Émile and Michel (son of Émile), Claude and Jean-Philippe (son of Jean), Yvon and Loïc (son of Paul) - then begin to enter the business. In 1967, a century after their creation, the Decré establishments employed around eight hundred people. The family also opened its first hypermarket under the Record brand, on the outskirts of Nantes, at the foot of the Sillon de Bretagne building (current Auchan hypermarket) in Saint-Herblain. It was then the fourth hypermarket in France and at the time the second in size with its 6,500 m^{2}. But competition in the mass distribution sector is starting to be tough, other brands like Carrefour, E.Leclerc and Casino are booming.

The family companies gradually changed their operation by coming together to form a group within the « Société d’Étude Decré » (SED), a parent company with a supervisory board and a management board.

Choices had to be made in the 1970s among the Group's three activities. To refinance and develop Frigécréme, which in 1976 produced ten million liters of ice cream in its Saint-Herblain factory, it separated in 1978 from its Record hypermarkets in favor of the Docks de France (Mammouth hypermarkets).

Shortly after, the majority of the thirty family shareholders decided to recover their capital. SED was therefore sold in 1979 to Nouvelles Galeries (a company subsequently absorbed by the Groupe Galeries Lafayette) with a written commitment to continue operating the group's two activities: Frigécrème and the department store. This commitment was not kept, with the sale of Frigécrème to BSN, and led in 1981 to the resignation of Yvon Decré, the last representative of the group still present as chairman of the board of directors of the SED, as well as the dissolution of the band. On 9 June 1998 the Frigécrème factory in Herbline was ravaged by a fire and its new owner, the Unilever group, decided to cease the company's activities.

A historic symbol of downtown Nantes, the « Decré » signs on rue de la Marne are still maintained and protected by the city. The city center micro-district in which it is located is also called « Decré-Cathédrale ».

== Bibliography ==
- Decré, Jean-Philippe (1998). Nantes - Decré (in French) (Éditions C.M.D ed.). p. 106.

== Externals links ==
- Les Decré - Des pionniers du grand commerce (article published in l'Express on April 17, 2003)
- Decré, un nom et un souvenir qui traversent les époques (article published in 20 Minutes on December 14, 2009)
- Nantes Patrimonia : Decré
