= Nouvelles Galeries =

French department stores, 1897 to 2008

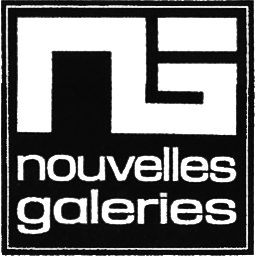
- Industry: retail
- Founded: 1897; 128 years ago
- Headquarters: France
- Number of locations: 2 (2025)
- Area served: France

Nouvelles Galeries is a French department store chain owned and operated by Galeries Lafayette. Founded in 1897 the chain previously was one of the largest department store chains in France however now only has two locations.

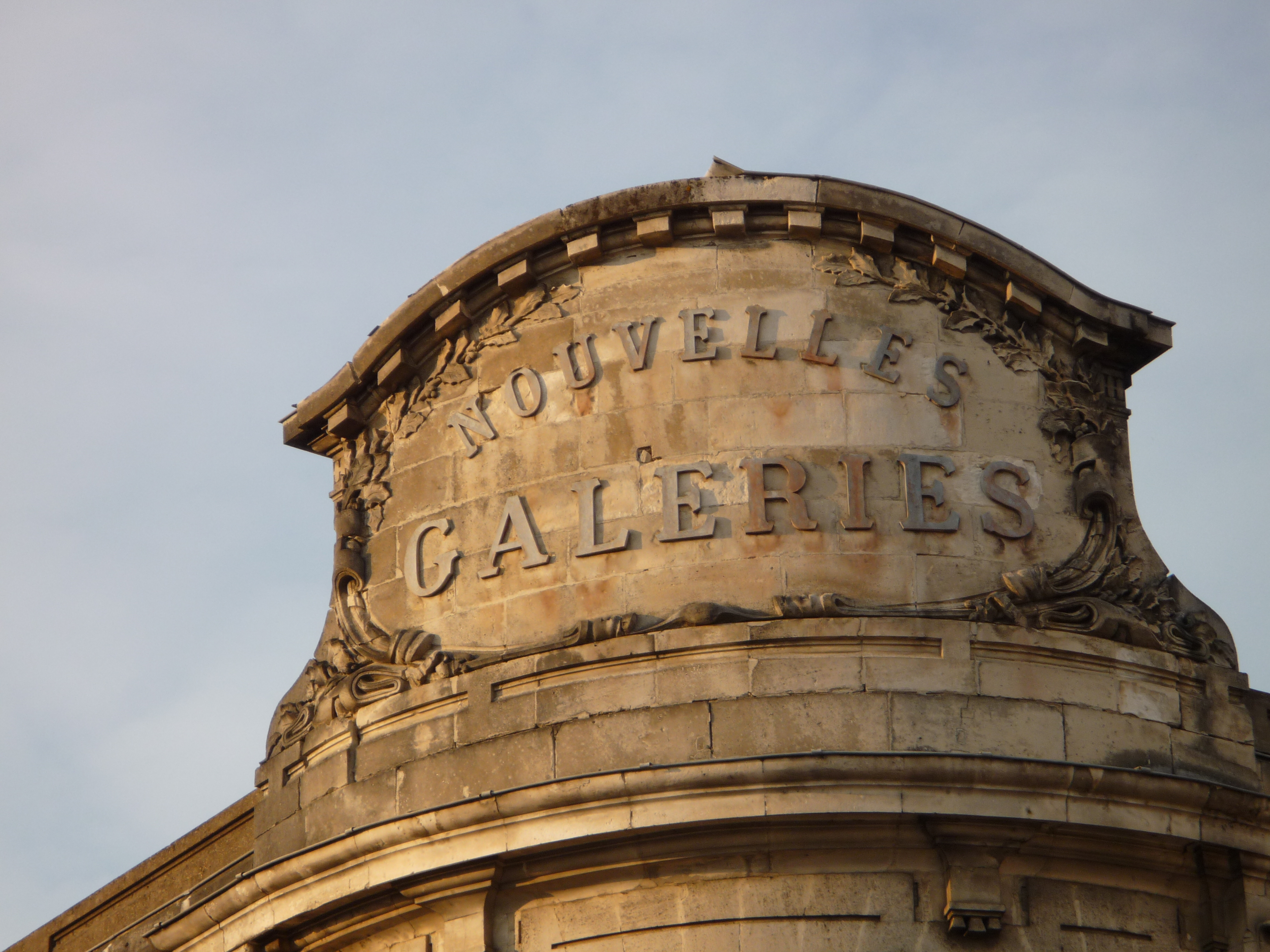
Fronton of the Nouvelles Galeries de Mont-de-Marsan store.

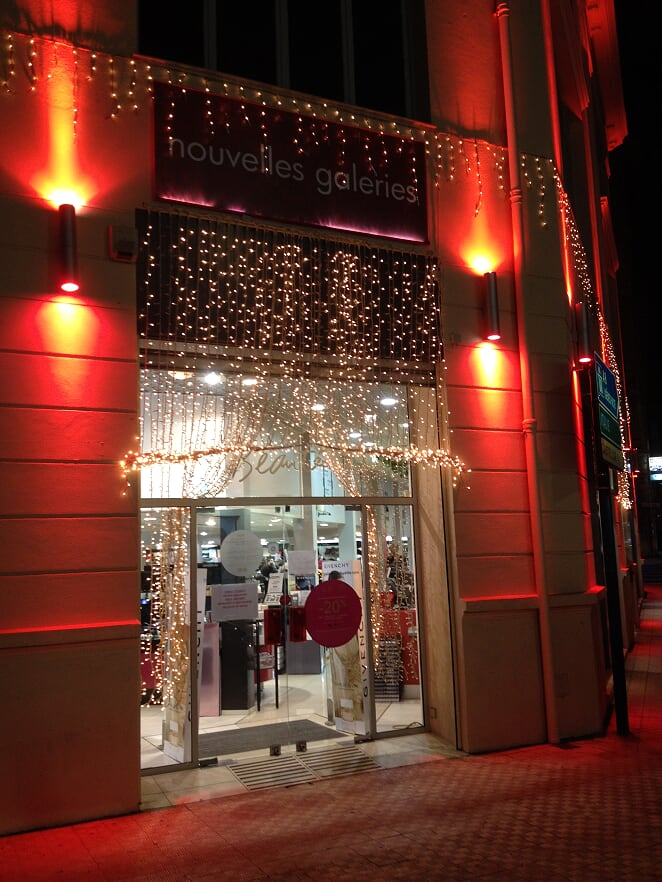
Nouvelles Galeries in Menton in 2014.

== History ==
In 1897 Nouvelles Galeries was created.

In 1928 Nouvelles Galeries created the Uniprix variety store brand. In 1997 it was sold to Monoprix.

The Cofinoga consumer credit card was launched by the brand in 1971, they also began offering insurance in 1979.

The companies Parisian headquarters were sold in 1983. The headquarters had its own testing laboratory, integrated printing press, high-tech computer platform. They also hosted presentations of all products sold in the stores and the central purchasing office.

At the beginning of the 1980s SFNGR (Société française des Nouvelles Galeries réunies) was made up of over 160 stores which employed 25,000 people and around 30 stores of Centre Maison Jardin.

In 1991 the company was purchased by Groupe Galeries Lafayette, at the time Nouvelles Galeries had nearly 90 stores.

In later 2005, Paul Delaoutre (general manager of Groupe Galeries Lafayette) said that by the end of 2007 the 10 remaining Nouvelles Galeries stores would be rebranded to Galeries Lafayette.

However as of 2025 stores still operate (now co-branded as Nouvelles Galeries and Galeries Lafayette) in Belfort and Langon. An Annecy shopping centre anchored by Galeries Lafayette has also taken on the Nouvelles Galeries name, however, the Galeries Lafayette is not branded as Nouvelles Galeries.

== Locations ==
If the closing date is N/A then the store was rebranded to Galeries Lafayette.

| Location | Opening date | Closing date | Address | Notes |
|---|---|---|---|---|
| Agen | 72, boulevard de la République | Rebranded to Galeries Lafayette. | | |
| Alençon | 11 September 1965 | 31 December 1985 | rue du Pont-Neuf | Originally Gagne-petit from 1844 to 1965. |
| Amiens | 1900 | — | rue des Trois-Cailloux | Rebranded to Galeries Lafayette in 2005. |
| Angers | 6 April 1901 | — | rue d'Alsace/place du Ralliement | Rebranded to Galeries Lafayette in 1993. |
| Angoulême | | — | 10, rue René-Goscinny | Rebranded to Galeries Lafayette. |
| Annecy | 25 February 1969 | — | 25 Avenue du Parmelan | |
| Arras | | 1997 | 35 Rue Ernestale, 62000 Arras | Previously Galeries Modernes. |
| Auch | | | place Jean David/rue Gambetta | |
| Avignon | 15 September 1904 | 1984 | rue de la République | |
| Bédarieux | | | | Created by the father of Roger Peyrefitte. |
| Belfort | | Open | 24, faubourg de France | |
| Biarritz | | | 17-19 Place Georges-Clemenceau | Rebranded to Galeries Lafayette. |
| Bourges | | | 6-8 rue Moyenne | |
| Bordeaux | 1984 | 2000 | rue Sainte-Catherine | |
| Boulogne-sur-Mer | | 2003 | 57 rue Thiers | |
| Beauvais | | | Place Jeanne Hachette | Passage under the Galeries Lafayette brand |
| Bergerac | | December 31, 1999 | 3 stores : Rue de la Résistance, Place Gambetta and Rue Mounet-Sully | The store located on rue Mounet-Sully closed on December 31, 1999 (the reconversion of the building has been going on ever since.) |
| Brive-la-Gaillarde | 1967 | December, 31 2000 | | Operated by the Casino group. |
| Bron | September 18, 1964 | | Boulevard Pinel | Rebranded to Galeries Lafayette. |
| Caen | 1954 | | 108-114, boulevard Maréchal-Leclerc Before 1944 : 86-92, rue Saint-Jean / 13-15, rue de Bernières | The store existed before the Second World War (former Grand Bazaar). It was located on rue Saint-Jean and rue de Bernières. Destroyed during the landing, it was rebuilt on the site of Galeries Lafayette, boulevard Maréchal-Leclerc. It was then taken over under the Galeries Lafayette brand. |
| Chalon-sur-Saône | Before 1906 | | Boulevard de la république | Rebranded to Galeries Lafayette. |
| Châteauroux | 1899 | 2005 | 41, rue Victor-Hugo | Former Grand Bazar store, art nouveau building designed by architect Camille Létang. In 1964, Gérard Depardieu got his first role there at the age of 16, that of Santa Claus. In 2008, the building underwent major redevelopments (the ground floor accommodated various local businesses, the upper floors housed homes) and adopted the name Cour du Capitole. |
| Clermont-Ferrand | | | Place de Jaude | Ex Galeries de la Jaude Passage under the Galeries Lafayette brand |
| Coutances | | Early 2000s | Place du Parvis Notre-Dame | The Galeries de Coutances existed before the war and will be built to become the Nouvelles Galleries. At the time of its closure, it was the group's smallest non-franchise store. |
| Dax | | | Rue Saint Vincent | Rebranded to Galeries Lafayette. |
| Dijon | 1924 (Magasins Modernes) | | 41-49, rue de la Liberté | Initially Magasins Modernes, which became Nouvelles Galeries in 1955, then passage under the Galeries Lafayette brand |
| Dunkirk | | late 1980s | Boulevard Alexandre III | |
| Douai | 1952 | 1988 | Place d'Armes | |
| Douai | the 50's | late 1980s | Place du Dauphin | |
| Évreux | 1871 (Art Deco building) | December 25, 1996 | 18 rue de la Harpe | |
| Évry | 1975 | | Évry 2 | Rebranded to Galeries Lafayette. |
| Fontainebleau | 1913 | | Nouvelles Galeries Building | |
| Grenoble | 1939 | 1993 | 12, place Grenette | Resumption of Galeries Modernes' in 1939. Change to Galeries Lafayette brand on September 10, 1993. |
| Grenoble | | | 13, boulevard Maréchal Foch | Replaced by an Intermarché. |
| Grenoble | 1975 | 1990 | Grand'Place | The brand closed its doors in the 1980s, only the food section was taken over by the Genty-Cathiard brand, absorbed by the Rallye in 1990, (a subsidiary of the Groupe Casino since 1992), the Grand'Place store closed definitively in 1990. |
| Guéret | 1990 | 2009 | 2 Grande Rue | Trade in various articles, then clothing, leather goods and fashion accessories |
| La Flèche | | 1993 | rue Carnot | |
| La Roche-sur-Yon | | | Rue Georges-Clemenceau | Rebranded to Galeries Lafayette. |
| Langon | 1966 (?) | Open | 1 Place du Général-de-Gaulle | |
| Laval | 1920 | 2002 | Rue du Général-de-Gaulle | BNP Paribas will open a 400 m^{2} agency there less than a year later, while the Douglas perfumery will take over the 1st floor and the annex on the right. It was not until June 2008 that the Player store, which recently became Player One, moved into the last part, at the rear, rue des Maréchaux. |
| Le Havre | 1954 | 1999 | rue de Paris | In 2003, the Nouvelles Galeries were divided into several stores, some of which are closed to this day. Today, there is the La Galerne bookstore, Roche Bobois. The floors are allocated to offices. |
| Le Mans | 1905 | | Rue des Minimes | Closed |
| Lens | 1963 | late 1980s | Boulevard Basly | |
| Les Sables-d'Olonne | | | | |
| Lille | October 1965 | 1985 | Rue Nationale | |
| Limoges | | | boulevard Carnot and rue Porte-Tourny | Rebranded to Galeries Lafayette. |
| Lisieux | August 2, 1972 | January 31, 2008 | Rue des Mathurins | |
| Lorient | 1905 | 1997 | 10 place Alsace-Lorraine | Installation of the Nouvelles Galeries store (rue des Fontaines) in 1905. Passage under the Galeries Lafayette brand in 1997. |
| Marseille | | | | Nouvelles Galleries burned in 1938 then rebuilt within the Center Bourse. Passage under the Galeries Lafayette brand |
| Metz | 1967 | | 4 rue Winston-Churchill | Passage under the Galeries Lafayette brand, FNAC opening in the basement in 2012 |
| Millau | | | Place du Mandarous | |
| Montceau-les-Mines | | | | |
| Montauban | | May 21, 1999 | Rue Bessières | Passage under the Galeries Lafayette brand |
| Moulins | exists since 1900 (postcards) renovation by Lamaizière father and son; architects in Saint-Étienne in 1914. | | Rue d'Allier | |
| Mulhouse | | | 54, rue du Sauvage, near the Grands Magasins du Globe | Formerly Schwab, which became Nouvelles Galeries at the end of the 1970s. Closed at the end of the 1980s, and transformed into La Galerie shopping center, with McDonald's and Fnac (and Mango, Faller, etc.) as the main brands. |
| Montargis | During the 1970s | 2005 | Rue Dorée | Three-story store: Ground floor Makeup, beauty; 1st floor: KITCHEN; 2nd, 3rd floor: CHILDREN accessible via escalators. But has since disappeared. Formerly Nouvelles Galeries then Galeries Lafayettes. Currently store closed. |
| Nantes | ? (Formerly Decré) | | Quartier Bouffay | Changed brand (Galeries Lafayette) following the merger with the Galeries Lafayette store on rue du Calvaire |
| Nevers | | | | Closed. Replaced by various brands (Plus, Mango, Etam) |
| Niort | | | Rue Victor-Hugo | Rebranded to Galeries Lafayette. |
| Orléans | | | 6 rue Thiers | Rebranded to Galeries Lafayette. |
| Pau | | | Place Georges-Clemenceau | Initially Galeries Modernes, then Nouvelles Galeries. Passage under the Galeries Lafayette brand. In the current building since 1910, previously at 2, rue du Maréchal-Joffre. |
| Périgueux | | 2009 | 7 rue de la République | Renamed Les Galeries in the early 2000s Today, Benetton brand |
| Quimper | 1911 (1900 building) | | 4, Place Saint-Corentin | |
| Rouen | | | 25 rue Grand-Pont | Destroyed in the fire of June 1940, rebuilt in 1953 |
| Saint-Claude | 1988 | 2009 | 29 rue du Pré | |
| Saint-Étienne | 1985 | 2005 | 15 rue Gambetta | |
| Saint-Laurent-du-Var | October 21, 1969 | | Cap 3000 | ? (Passage under the Galeries Lafayette brand) |
| Saint-Nazaire | February 26, 1960 | 1990 | 36 avenue de la République | Replaced by Intersport then 5e avenue |
| Saint-Quentin | 1904 | 1988 | | |
| Sarreguemines | 1969 | 1992 | Chaussée de Louvain | |
| Tarbes | | | Rue Maréchal-Foch | 4,500 m^{2}. Passage under the Galeries Lafayette brand |
| Thionville | March 5, 1964 | July 9, 2005 | 50 rue de Paris | |
| Toulouse | 1962 | | Rue Lapeyrouse | Passage under the Galeries Lafayette brand in September 2005 |
| Valence | | 2001 | Boulevard du Général-De-Gaulle | |

== Centre Maison Jardin ==
In the early 1980s the company created CMJ (Centre Maison Jardin, or in English Home Garden Centre). When Groupe Galeries Lafayette purchased Nouvelles Galeries in 1991 it was now a division of the group. However in 1997 the remaining 16 stores were sold and rebranded.

In 1985 the Angoulême store was converted to BHV.

== Incidents ==
On October 4, 1972, an individual shot at customers of the Nouvelles Galeries in Angoulême with a Winchester .44 rifle, killing four people (three children and a woman) and injuring six others.

== See also ==
- Fire in the New Galleries
