= Labfresh =

Dutch menswear company

LABFRESH
- Type: Private
- Industry: Clothing
- Founded: 3 January 2017; 9 years ago
- Founders: Kasper Brandi Petersen; Lotte Vink
- Headquarters: Amsterdam, Netherlands
- Products: Menswear
- Website: labfresh.eu

LABFRESH is a menswear company based in Amsterdam, founded in 2017 by Kasper Brandi Petersen and Lotte Vink. It sells shirts, T-shirts, trousers and other basics treated to repel stains and odours. The company has financed its growth largely through crowdfunding from its customers rather than venture capital or bank loans. In 2025 Quote reported that its revenue was approaching €10 million.

== History ==
=== Kickstarter and Dragons' Den ===
LABFRESH launched a stain-repellent shirt on Kickstarter in January 2017, using a patented process that makes cotton fibres repel water, oil and bacteria without a coating. According to Sprout, nearly 1,100 people pre-ordered the shirt for a total of €140,000. The launch was covered in Dutch, Danish and international media.

In 2018 the founders appeared on Løvens hule, the Danish version of Dragons' Den, and secured a DKK 600,000 investment from Tommy Ahlers. In 2020 the company also appeared in the first season of the Dutch version of Dragons' Den, where investors Pieter Schoen and Nikkie Plessen acquired a 15% stake for around DKK 2 million.

=== Growth and retail ===
Sprout reported revenue of €1.5 million in 2018, with €2 million expected that year. In 2019 Bloomberg News profiled the company in a story on sustainability in fashion. LABFRESH added polo shirts and trousers to its range in 2019.

The company initially sold online only. In 2021 it opened a store on the Van Baerlestraat in Amsterdam. On 25 November 2022 it opened its first store outside the Netherlands, in Copenhagen. In 2024 it opened a store in the Mall of the Netherlands in Leidschendam.

In 2021 LABFRESH and the Dutch denim brand Kings of Indigo released a limited denim shirt and jacket using LABFRESH's dirt- and odour-repellent treatment. In May 2025 it announced a collection designed together with the former Danish international footballer Lasse Schöne, who said LABFRESH had approached him and that they designed the clothes together; a second collection followed on 16 October 2026. In 2025 it began offering stain- and odour-resistant uniforms to restaurants and hotels, and raised funds to launch a womenswear line.

== Founders ==
LABFRESH was founded by Kasper Brandi Petersen and Lotte Vink, a couple who run the company together as co-CEOs. Petersen is Danish, from Solrød, and studied at Copenhagen Business School. In 2013 he and Asbjørn Jørgensen co-founded The Cloakroom, an Amsterdam-based online personal-shopping service for men. In 2015 Berlingske Business Magasin included Petersen, then 29, in its Talent 100 list of Danish business talents. The Cloakroom was acquired by the Berlin-based Modomoto in 2016, after which Petersen and Jørgensen joined the management board of the merged Curated Shopping Group.

Lotte Vink is Dutch. She met Petersen while working at The Cloakroom, where she was among the first 30 employees. The couple later moved to Berlin, where they developed the idea for LABFRESH. In interviews Vink has summarised the brand's philosophy as "buy less, but better". She has also been a public voice for the company's crowdfunding model. In a 2025 interview with Quote she said she preferred paying interest to customers rather than to banks, and set out the founders' goal of growing revenue from around €10 million to €100 million with the backing of the crowd.

== Financing ==
LABFRESH has raised most of its capital from customers through a series of crowdfunding campaigns: product pre-sales on Kickstarter, loans on the Dutch platform CrowdAboutNow, an equity round on Seedrs and bond issues on Eyevestor. In July 2025 TechSavvy reported that the company had raised more than DKK 40 million from 1,332 private investors, much of it as loans paying 5–7% interest, and described it as the most crowdfunded fashion brand in Europe. Apart from crowdfunding, the company raised €1 million from angel investors in 2019 and has not taken venture capital. Quote reported in August 2025 a total of €4 million from more than 1,000 investors across eight rounds.

Crowdfunding rounds
Year	Type	Platform	Amount	Investors	Purpose
2021	Loan	CrowdAboutNow	€400,000	232	Amsterdam store
2022	Loan	CrowdAboutNow	€400,000	140	Two new stores, starting with Copenhagen
2023	Equity (10%)	Seedrs	€1.34 million	817	Expansion in Germany and the UK, new stores
2025	Bonds (two issues)	Eyevestor	€1.8 million	over 1,000 (first issue)	Womenswear line, new store

The 2023 equity round valued the company at €12 million before the investment and closed at 266% of its €500,000 target. In January 2025 Denmark changed its law to allow private limited companies (anpartsselskaber) to raise equity through crowdfunding, a change Kasper Brandi Petersen had publicly argued for.

== Products and technology ==
LABFRESH garments are treated to repel liquids, stains and odours and to reduce wrinkling, with the stated aim of reducing how often clothes need washing. Business Insider and Børsen reviewed the clothing in everyday use. In 2024 the company introduced garments made partly from oyster shells.

== Marketing ==
In January 2020 LABFRESH published a "Fashion Waste Index" ranking European countries by textile waste, which was reported by Euronews, NRC and Der Tagesspiegel. In October 2020 it began airing a television commercial, made by the agency These Cavemen, aimed at challenging stereotypes. In 2025 it said it had stopped using AI-generated images in its campaigns after two years, citing weaker results.

== Criticism ==
In 2021 the Danish consumer council's chemicals unit, Forbrugerrådet Tænk Kemi, found that LABFRESH had marketed antibacterial socks as containing silver without stating that the silver was in nano form; the company said it would add "nano" to the labelling.

The Danish publication Sustainreport reported in 2022 that the original version of LABFRESH's shirt, the product presented on Løvens hule in 2018, had been treated with PFAS, and that newer shirts were marketed as PFAS-free while remaining stock of the earlier version was still being sold. In 2023 it criticised DR for having featured the PFAS-treated shirt on the programme.

In March 2026 the Danish Consumer Ombudsman criticised LABFRESH for sustainability claims on its website that it could not adequately document, including figures for energy and water saved in 2022. The company removed the claims, and Kasper Brandi Petersen said it was "very embarrassed". LABFRESH maintained that its 2022 figures were correct and said it had hired Circular Innovations and CITEVE in 2025 to produce third-party verified test results.
