= Hôtel de Ville, Saint-Laurent-du-Var =

Town hall in Saint-Laurent-du-Var, France

Hôtel de Ville
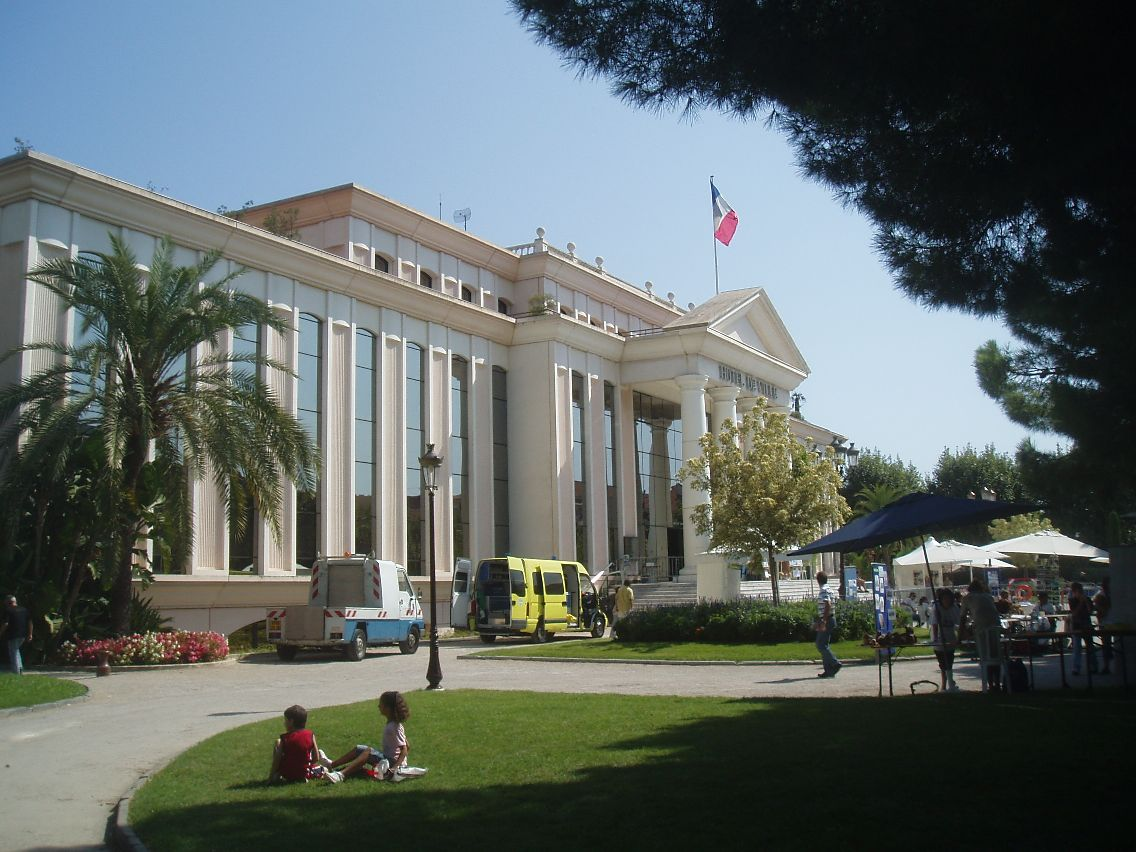
- The main frontage of the Hôtel de Ville in October 2008
- Interactive map of the Hôtel de Ville area

General information
- Type: City hall
- Architectural style: Modern style
- Location: Saint-Laurent-du-Var, France
- Coordinates: 43.6752°N 7.1918°E
- Completed: 1993

Design and construction
- Architect: Cabinet Anfosso-Cecconi

The Hôtel de Ville (French pronunciation: [otɛl də vil], City Hall) is a municipal building in Saint-Laurent-du-Var, Alpes-Maritimes, in southeastern France, standing on Esplanade du Levant.

== History ==
The first municipal building in Saint-Laurent-du-Var was a combined town hall and school which was established at No. 67 Rue de l'Église where it remained throughout the 19th century. In the early 1920s, the town council led by the mayor, Léon Bérenger, decided to commission a dedicated town hall. The site they selected was on the west side of what is now Avenue du Général Leclerc. It was designed in the neoclassical style, built in ashlar stone and was completed in 1922.

The original design involved a symmetrical main frontage of five bays facing onto the street. The central section of three bays featured three round headed openings with voussoirs on the ground floor. On the first floor, there were three casement windows which were surmounted by finely carved panels and flanked by Ionic order pilasters supporting an entablature and a balustraded parapet. The outer bays were fenestrated by casement windows with voussoirs on the ground floor and by casement windows with moulded surrounds on the first floor. The building was later extended to the north by one extra bay. After the building was no longer required for municipal use, it was converted for use as the Conservatoire de Musique et d'Art dramatique (Conservatory of Music and Dramatic Arts).

In the Second World War, during the German occupation of the town, the mayor, Louis Ravet, resisted the occupying forces, protected local jews and turned the town hall into a centre for forging documents for the French Resistance. The town was eventually liberated by American troops on 27 August 1944.

In the early 1990s, following significant population growth, the council led by the mayor, Marc Moschetti, decided to commission a modern town hall. The site they selected, close to the west bank of the River Var, was a former pétanque court. The new building was designed by Cabinet Anfosso-Cecconi in the modern style, built in concrete and glass and was officially opened by the Minister of the Interior, Charles Pasqua, on 3 July 1993.

The design involved a symmetrical main frontage of 23 bays facing onto Esplanade du Levant. The central section of seven bays, which was slightly projected forward, featured a tetrastyle portico, formed by four Doric order columns supporting a pediment. The outer bays of the central section were fenestrated by full height segmental headed plate glass windows. The wings of eight bays each were fenestrated in a similar style. Internally, the principal rooms were the Salle du Conseil (council chamber), the Salle des Mariages (wedding room), and a large assembly hall known as the "Espace Grappelli", which was named after the jazz violinist, Stéphane Grappelli, who performed at the International Jazz Festival on the French Riviera in 1948.
