= Nice metropolitan area =

Metropolitan area in France

Nice metropolitan area Aire d'attraction de Nice (French)
- Urban
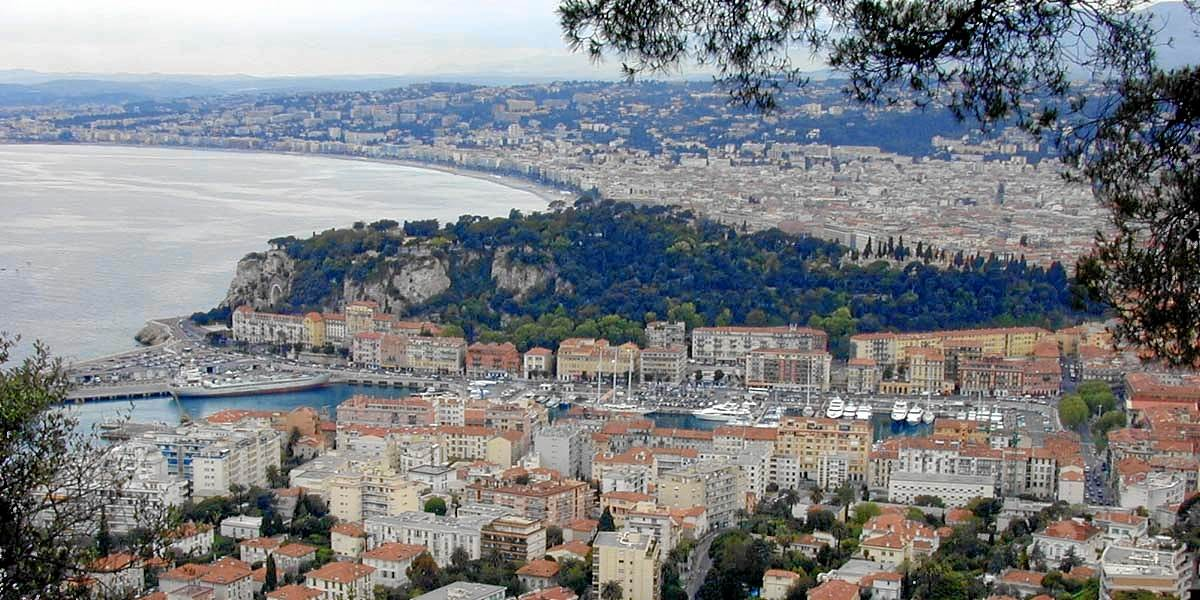
- Urban area of Nice

- Location within Provence-Alpes-Côte d'Azur Location within France
- Coordinates: 43°43′N 7°16′E
- Country: France
- Region: Provence-Alpes-Côte d'Azur
- Department: Alpes-Maritimes, Alpes-de-Haute-Provence

Area
  - Total: 2,073 km^{2} (800 sq mi)

Population (2021)
  - Total: 1,103,527
  - Density: 532.3/km^{2} (1,379/sq mi)

GDP
  - Total: €39.592 billion (2021)

Nice metropolitan area (French: aire d'attraction de Nice) as defined by INSEE in 2021 is the functional urban area or commuting zone of the city of Nice, southeastern France. It covers 100 communes, has 1,103,527 inhabitants (2021) and an area of 2,073 km^{2}. It partly overlaps with the urban unit (contiguously built-up area) of Nice, which covers some cities, e.g. Antibes, Grasse and Cannes, that are part of the functional area Cannes-Antibes.

== Geography ==
The functional urban area of Nice covers the central and southern part of the Alpes-Maritimes department (98 communes) and two adjacent communes in Alpes-de-Haute-Provence. The urban area of Monaco-Menton lies adjacent to the east, the urban area of Cannes-Antibes lies adjacent to the southwest. The most populous communes in the urban area are Nice, Cagnes-sur-Mer, Carros, Saint-Laurent-du-Var, La Trinité, Vence and Villeneuve-Loubet, all of which are on or close to the Mediterranean coast.

Transportation is based on a railway line and vital A8 autoroute, built from 1966. Nice Côte d'Azur Airport is the second biggest in France with more than 9 million passengers welcomed every year.

== History ==
In the beginning of the nineteenth century, Nice was a 20,000 inhabitants city belonging to the Kingdom of Piedmont-Sardinia. It grew steadily to reach 48,273 inhabitants in 1861, one year after annexation to the French Second Empire. By the end of the century, the population was over 100,000.

The urbanized area began to spread outside city limits, in La Trinité to the North, Villefranche-sur-Mer to the East and Cagnes-sur-Mer to the West. In the meantime, old cities, about 30 km to the West, like Grasse, Cannes, Antibes were experiencing regular growth as well.

After World War II, growth increased with the development of mass tourism and development of transports in the region. The consequences of the end of the Algerian War were also very important for the region's population, with many Pied-Noirs settling in the area. The growth in main cities decreased, while new town were growing very quickly like Saint-Laurent-du-Var, Vallauris, Le Cannet.

In the 1990 census, INSEE identified two distinct aire urbaines in the département : Nice, with 539,217 inhabitants, and Cannes-Grasse-Antibes with 352,000 inhabitants.

Only nine years later, with the 1999 census, the two aires merged to form French sixth aire urbaine. At the 2010 zoning, the aire urbaine of Nice consisted of 129 communes, of which 2 in Alpes-de-Haute-Provence, 5 in Var and 122 in Alpes-Maritimes. At the 2020 zoning, the functional area of Cannes-Antibes was separated from that of Nice.

The table below shows the evolution of the seven most important communes parts of nowadays aire urbaine of Nice (census data).

City	1901	1954	1999
Nice	105 109	244 360	342 738
Antibes	10 947	27 064	72 412
Cannes	30 420	50 192	67 304
Cagnes-sur-Mer	3 381	11 066	43 942
Grasse	15 429	22 187	43 874
Le Cannet	3 097	11 601	42 158
Saint-Laurent-du-Var	1 530	5 623	27 141

== Organisation ==
This statistic-based metropolitan area is divided into multiple administrative divisions. Among them are:

- Métropole Nice Côte d'Azur, that groups 51 communes, not all of them belonging to the metropolitan area. This agglomeration community is 1,480 square kilometers large and hosts 546,000 inhabitants.
- Communauté d'agglomération de Sophia Antipolis, 24 communes, 10 of which in the metropolitan area of Nice
- Communauté d'agglomération du Pays de Grasse, 23 communes, 5 of which in the metropolitan area of Nice
- Communauté de communes Alpes d'Azur, 34 communes, not all of them part of the metropolitan area of Nice
- Communauté de communes du Pays des Paillons, 11 communes, all part of the metropolitan area of Nice

== See also ==
- Urban area (France)
