= Westfield Mall of the Netherlands =

Shopping mall in South Holland, Netherlands

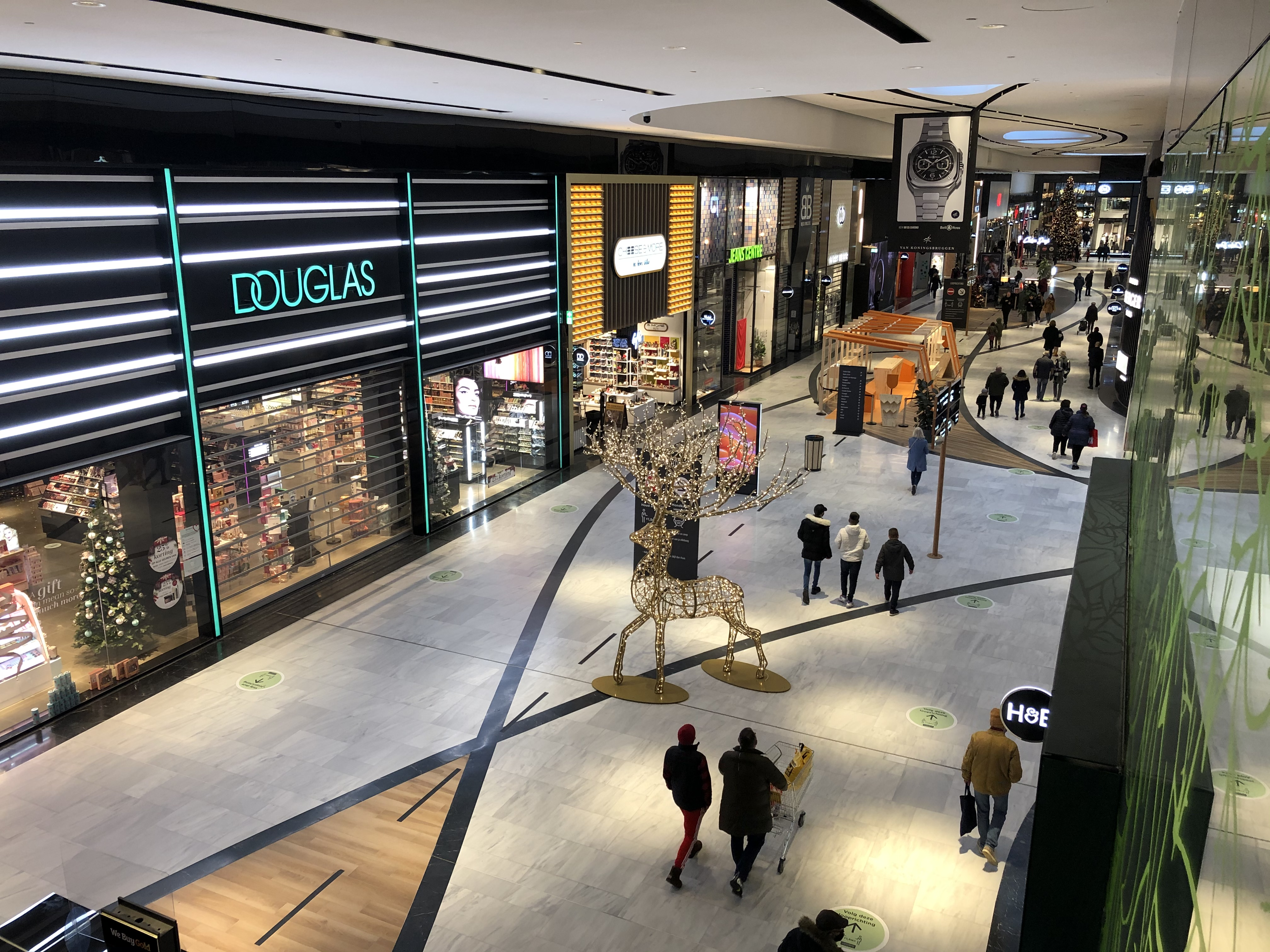
- Interior view (November 2020)
- Location: Leidschendam, Netherlands
- Coordinates: 52°5′19″N 4°23′3″E
- Opened: 23 September 1971 (as Leidsenhage); 18 March 2021 (as Westfield Mall of the Netherlands)
- Developer: Unibail-Rodamco-Westfield
- Manager: Unibail-Rodamco-Westfield
- Owner: Unibail-Rodamco-Westfield
- Architect: MVSA Architects
- Num. of stores: 280
- Num. of anchor tenants: 4
- Floor area: 117,000 m^{2} (1,260,000 sq ft)
- Parking: 4,000
- Website: Official website

Westfield Mall of the Netherlands is a shopping mall located in Leidschendam in the Netherlands. With a total retail floor area of 117,000 m^{2} (1,260,000 sq ft) it is the largest shopping mall in the Netherlands.

== History ==
=== Leidsenhage 1971–2017 ===
November 21, 1969, marks the official start of the construction works for the shopping center known at the time as Leidsenhage. The official opening is on 23 September 1971.

=== Mall of the Netherlands ===
On 6 March 2014, the municipality of Leidschendam-Voorburg and owner Unibail-Rodamco-Westfield signed an agreement on the future of the Leidsenhage shopping centre. After elaboration of the plans, the renovation started in the autumn of 2016. The existing shopping center was demolished in phases and replaced by a new building.

==== Development and construction ====
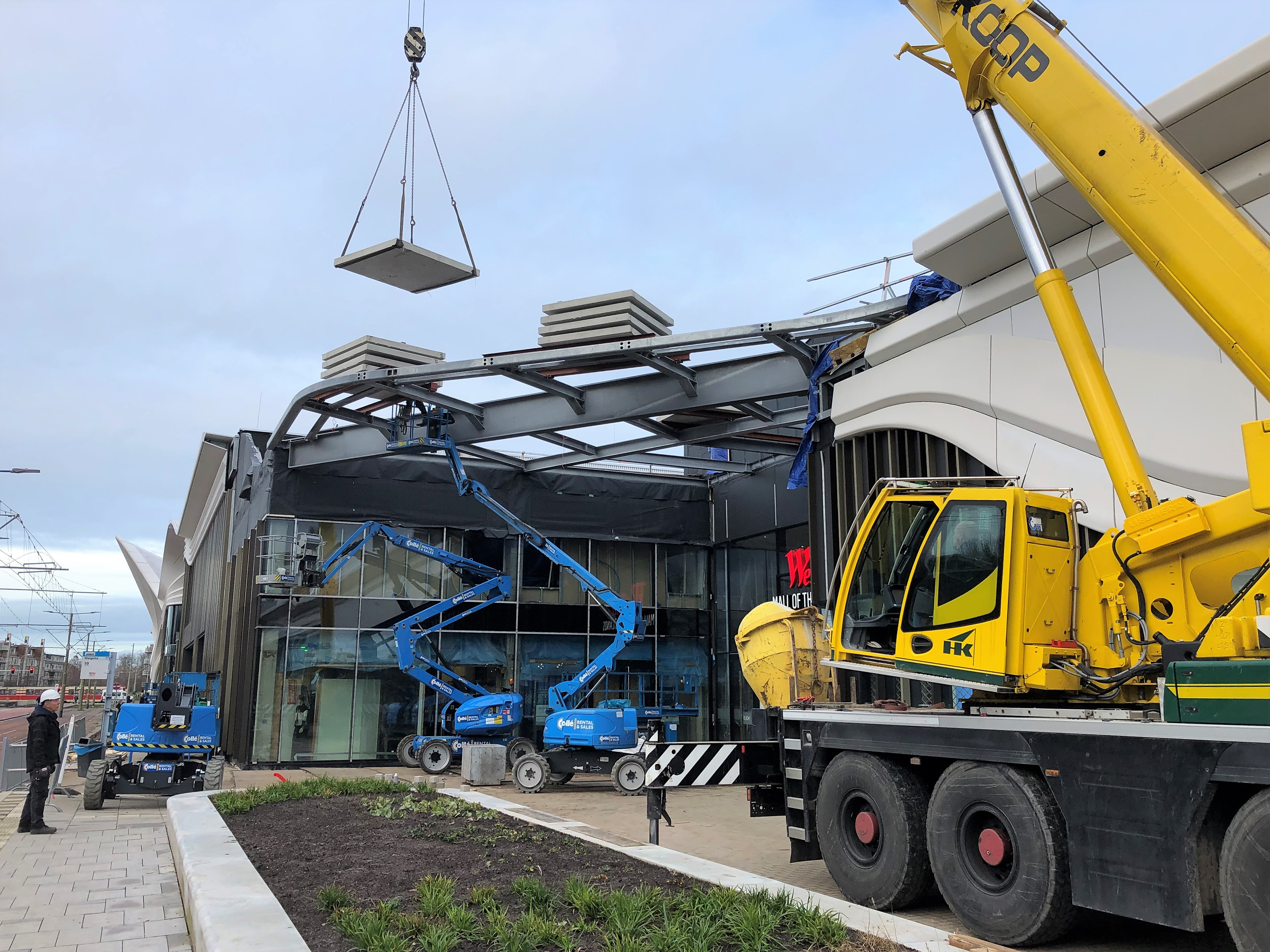
Construction of the façade.

Both the existing shells and the new buildings are connected by a façade with a white concrete top inspired by voile fabric, transforming itself along the building. The façade has been made of ultra-high-performance concrete. The simpler curved concrete panels are cast in adaptable steel moulds. The more complexly curved concrete panels are cast in moulds milled from large blocks of MDF.

In july 2023 the mall received a BREEAM in use v6 excellent certification on both asset and management.

==== Opening ====
Westfield Mall of the Netherlands officially opened on 18 March 2021.

== See also ==
- List of Unibail-Rodamco-Westfield properties
