= Sillon de Bretagne =

Skyscraper in Saint-Herblain, France

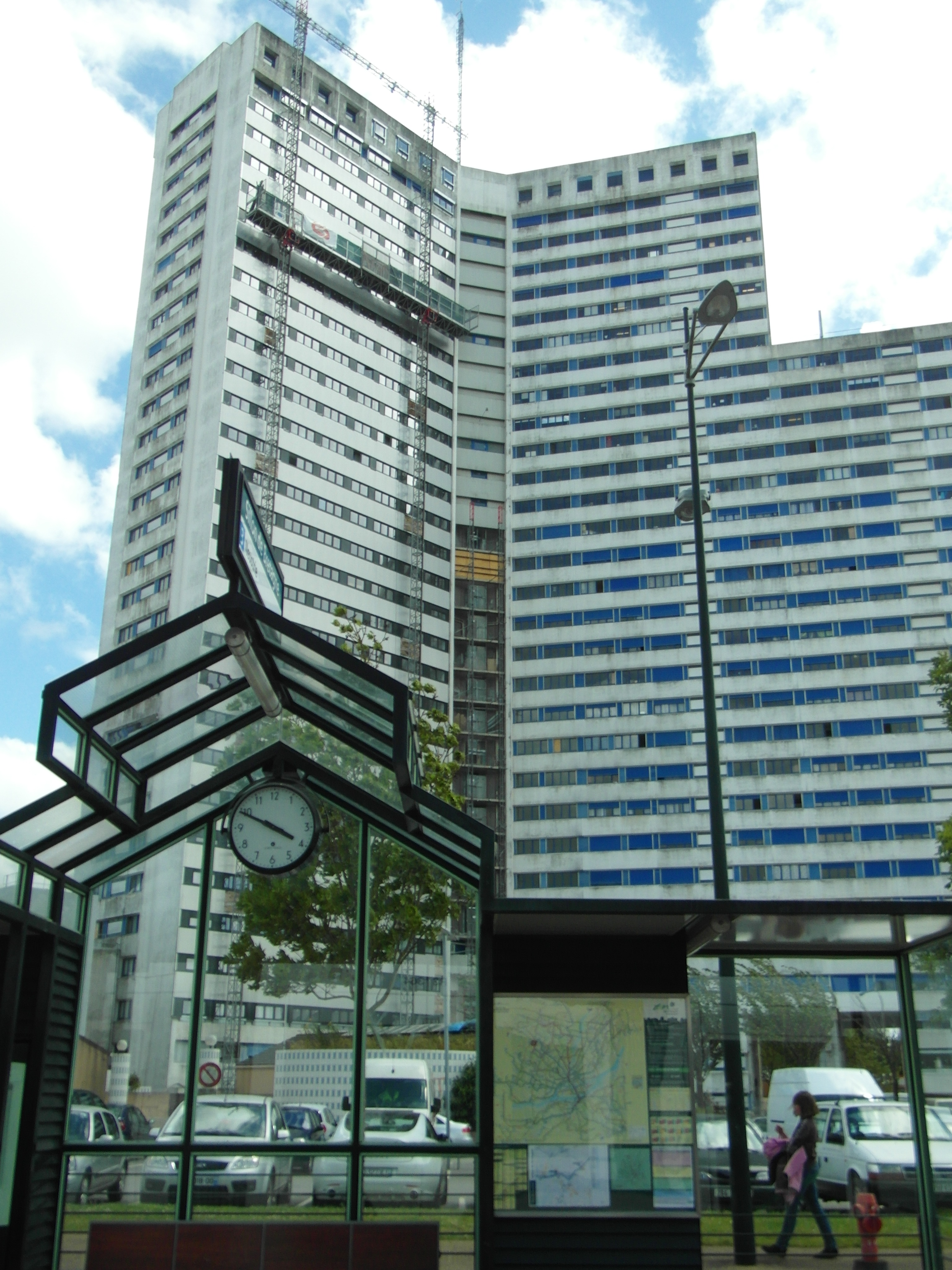
- Interactive map of the Sillon de Bretagne area

General information
- Status: Completed
- Type: Commercial offices Residential condominiums
- Architectural style: Brutalism
- Location: 8 Avenue des Thébaudières; Saint-Herblain
- Coordinates: 47.2442°N 1.6087°W
- Completed: 1969

Height
- Antenna spire: 101 m (331 ft)
- Roof: 97 m (318 ft)

Technical details
- Floor count: 33

Other information
- Number of units: 781

Sillon de Bretagne is a skyscraper in Saint-Herblain, a suburb of Nantes, in the Loire-Atlantique department of France. At 32-storeys, 97 m (318 ft) it was the tallest building in France when completed in 1969. With the structure's massive 425 m (1,394 ft) width, and a footprint of 36,200 meters square, it remains one of the largest buildings in Europe by volume, providing living and office accommodations for approximately 3,600 people. The roof top houses the antenna system for the Digital Audio Broadcast (DAB) transmitter operated by Groupement des radios associatives de la métropole nantaise (GRAM).
