= BHV (department store) =

French department store chain

Coordinates: 48°51′27″N 2°21′12″E

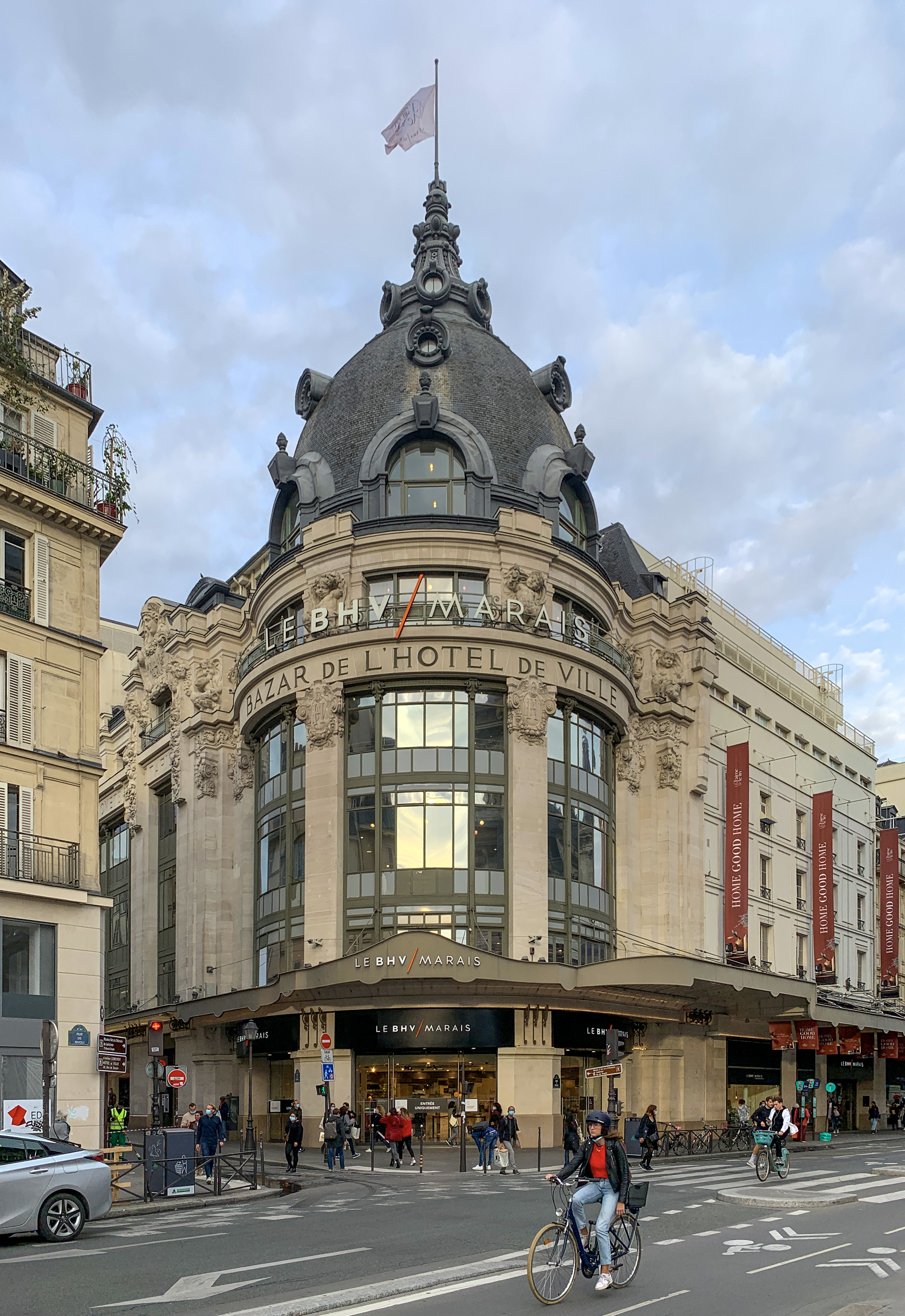
- Type: Private
- Industry: Retail
- Founded: 1856 (170 years ago) in Paris, France
- Founder: Xavier Ruel
- Headquarters: Paris, France
- Number of locations: 9 (2026)
- Area served: France
- Key people: Karl-Stéphane Cottendin (CEO)
- Number of employees: 1,300 (2023)
- Parent: Nouvelles Galeries (1989–1991); Galeries Lafayette Group (1991–2023); Groupe SGM (2023–2026)
- Website: bhv.fr

BHV, full name Bazar de l'Hôtel de Ville ("[the] Bazaar of the Hôtel de Ville"), is a French department store chain which focuses on ready-to-wear fashion, beauty, home, DIY home improvement, and hobby crafts. Founded in 1856 by Xavier Ruel and Marie-Madeleine Poncerry, the department store was under the control of Nouvelles Galeries from 1989 to 1991, then Groupe Galeries Lafayette from 1991 to 2023, and then Société des Grands Magasins from 2023, until its sale to the BHV senior management team in 2026.

The BHV flagship is at 52 Rue de Rivoli in the 4th arrondissement of Paris, facing the Hôtel de Ville (City Hall) from which it gets its name. The flagship location is served by the Hôtel de Ville Metro station.

As of 2026 BHV operates nine stores around France, alongside two specialised stores in Paris. The flagship, Parly 2 branch, and specialised stores are operated by BHV; the remaining provincial locations are operated by Sociéte des Grands Magasins.

== History ==
=== 1852–1990: Founding and expansion ===
Xavier Ruel and his wife Marie-Madeleine Poncerry moved to Paris in 1852 and Ruel started selling small items from carts around Paris and with the area around the Hôtel de Ville (Paris City Hall) being the area that earned the most, he and his wife decided to open a store in the area and rented out the ground floor of a building on Rue de Rivoli and opened "Bazar Parisian".

According to legend in 1855, Ruel saved the life of Empress Eugénie (wife of Napoleon III), her horses had become frightened after passing outside the store and Xavier ran out and calmed down the horses to reward him in saving her life she gave him a sum of money which allowed him to expand the store and in 1856 it was renamed to Bazar Napoléon. From 1860 Marie-Madeleine managed operations. In 1866 Xavier rented out 3 floors of 54 Rue de Rivoli after a boost in trading.

By 1870, Bazar Napoléon occupied all of the stores building on Rue de Rivoli. After the fall of the Second French Empire the store was renamed to "Bazar de l'Hôtel de Ville" referencing Hôtel de Ville across the street.

In 1900 at 78 years old founder Xavier Ruel died, at the time the business employed 800 people and recorded a capital of 12 million francs. He was succeeded by Marie-Madeleine as well as his daughters, their husbands, and a nephew.

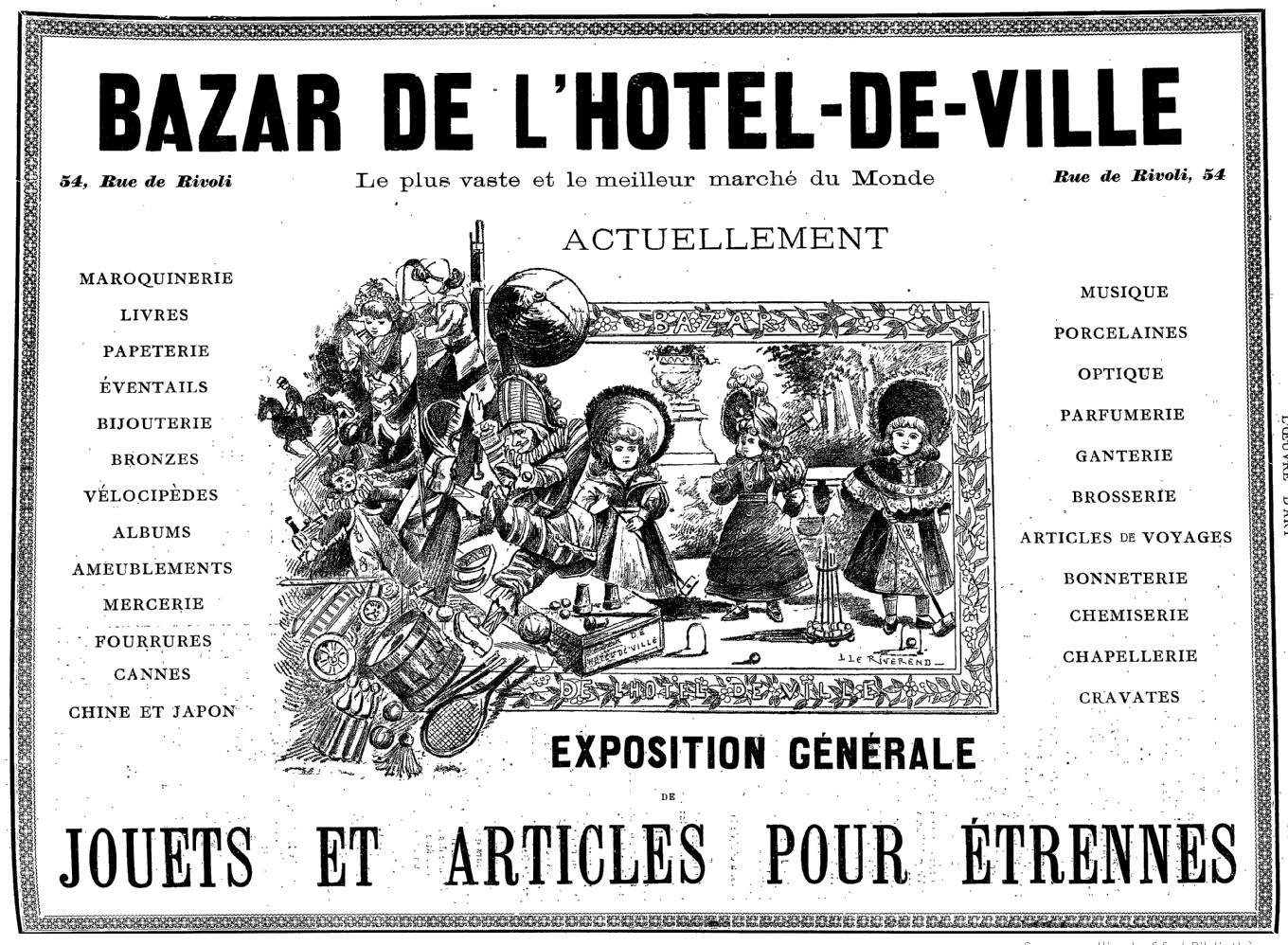
Advertisement for the Bazar de l'Hôtel de Ville published in the magazine L'Œuvre d'art in Paris, in 1895

The store underwent several renovations between 1903 and 1904 and again a major renovation in 1912-1913 to unify the building and add the Art Deco rotunda still visible today. This redesign was done by architect Auguste Roy.

Artist Marcel Duchamp bought his infamous "Bottle Rack" readymade object at BHV in 1914, the first of many artists to buy their materials at the store

In 1963, the first branch of the store opened and over time several BHV stores opened across France but all except the one at Parly 2 are now closed.

In 1963, the company opens its first branch store. Over time, several other BHV department stores are opened in Paris region, but all excluding Parly 2 have since closed. Also in 1963 the store became a member of the International Association of Department Stores, leaving the association in 1993.

A store opened at the Rosny 2 mall in Rosny-sous-Bois in 1973. In 2006 2 of the 3 floors were taken over by Galeries Lafayette and the store reopened as BHV Déco. Two floors became part of the mall's Galeries Lafayette in 2006 and on 17 July 2010 the store was permanently closed.

=== 1991–2022: Purchase by Galeries Lafayette and rebranding ===
In 1991 Galeries Lafayette bought BHV.

A store was opened in Beirut, Lebanon in December 1998 in a partnership with ADMIC.

In 2007–2008, the BHV expands its Marais flagship with new specialised stores, in the same neighborhood.

BHV Marais logo (2013–2025)

In 2012, the store management announced further modifications to its structure, with renovation on each floor, to give a renewal aspect to the store. Paul Delaoutre, CEO of the branch department stores of the Galeries Lafayette group explained that they “aimed at targeting creative urban inhabitants looking for originality”. This is the reason why they decided to “reinvent” the BHV. This also implied a new name which is no longer the BHV but the BHV Marais and a new logo.

In March 2017 a brand new store opened at City Walk in Dubai, UAE the store was 6,000 square metres and opened in partnership with ADMIC who also partnered with BHV to operate the store in Beirut.

Two stores were closed down in 2018 at the Part Dieu Mall in Part-Dieu a district of Lyon and the store in Limonest. In 2020 the store in Lebanon was closed down.

=== 2023–present: Under SGM, sale, and administration ===
It was announced in February 2023 that Groupe Galeries Lafayette had entered negotiations to sell the BHV to Société des Grands Magasins (now Groupe SGM) which operate a number of malls in France and seven Galeries Lafayette stores.

In November 2023 it was announced that the sale to Groupe SGM had been finalised and Groupe SGM now owned the BHV. In August 2024 it was reported that the company had not been paying vendors for several months, suppliers had also begun suspending deliveries leaving store shelves empty. The childrenswear and toy department in the Marais store is planned to close in February 2025.

According to Groupe SGM the BHV returned to profitability in 2024.

The men's building at the Marais (rebranded later to BHV Rivoli) store was sold by Groupe Galeries Lafayette to Xavier Niel in June 2025, the mens department is planned to be moved into the main BHV Marais building. Groupe SGM is currently attempting to raise funds to acquire the Marais building from Groupe Galeries Lafayette as it was not included in the 2023 sale.

In October 2025, online fast-fashion retailer Shein announced that its first permanent physical store would open at the BHV. Intentions to roll out Shein concessions within Groupe SGM's six Galeries Lafayette stores were also announced. After the announcement Groupe Galeries Lafayette stated:

Groupe Galeries Lafayette would like to express its deep disagreement with this decision with regard to the positioning and practices of this ultra-fast fashion brand, which is in contradiction with the offer and values of Galeries Lafayette. It is also contrary to the contractual conditions of affiliation that bind Groupe SGM to Galeries Lafayette.

Yann Rivoallan (president of Fédération Française du Prêt-à-Porter Féminin), declared Groupe SGM of "betraying decades of relationship with premium French brands". Multiple brands (notably Christian Dior and Guerlain) decided to stop selling at the BHV due to the opening of the Shein store and continued missed payments. Shein opened at BHV on 5 November amid a heavy police presence.

Following the termination of Groupe SGM's franchise contract with Galeries Lafayette, SGM owned and operated Galeries Lafayette stores were rebranded to BHV from the 15 November 2025.

In June 2026, Groupe SGM accepted an acquisition bid from the BHV senior management team. Groupe SGM still controls the seven provincial branch stores. The Shein stores within Parisian BHV branches will close by the end of 2026.

BHV (Rivoli and Parly 2) entered administration in November 2026 to "secure the department store’s recovery plan, owing to the landlord’s failure to implement the agreements."

== Stores ==
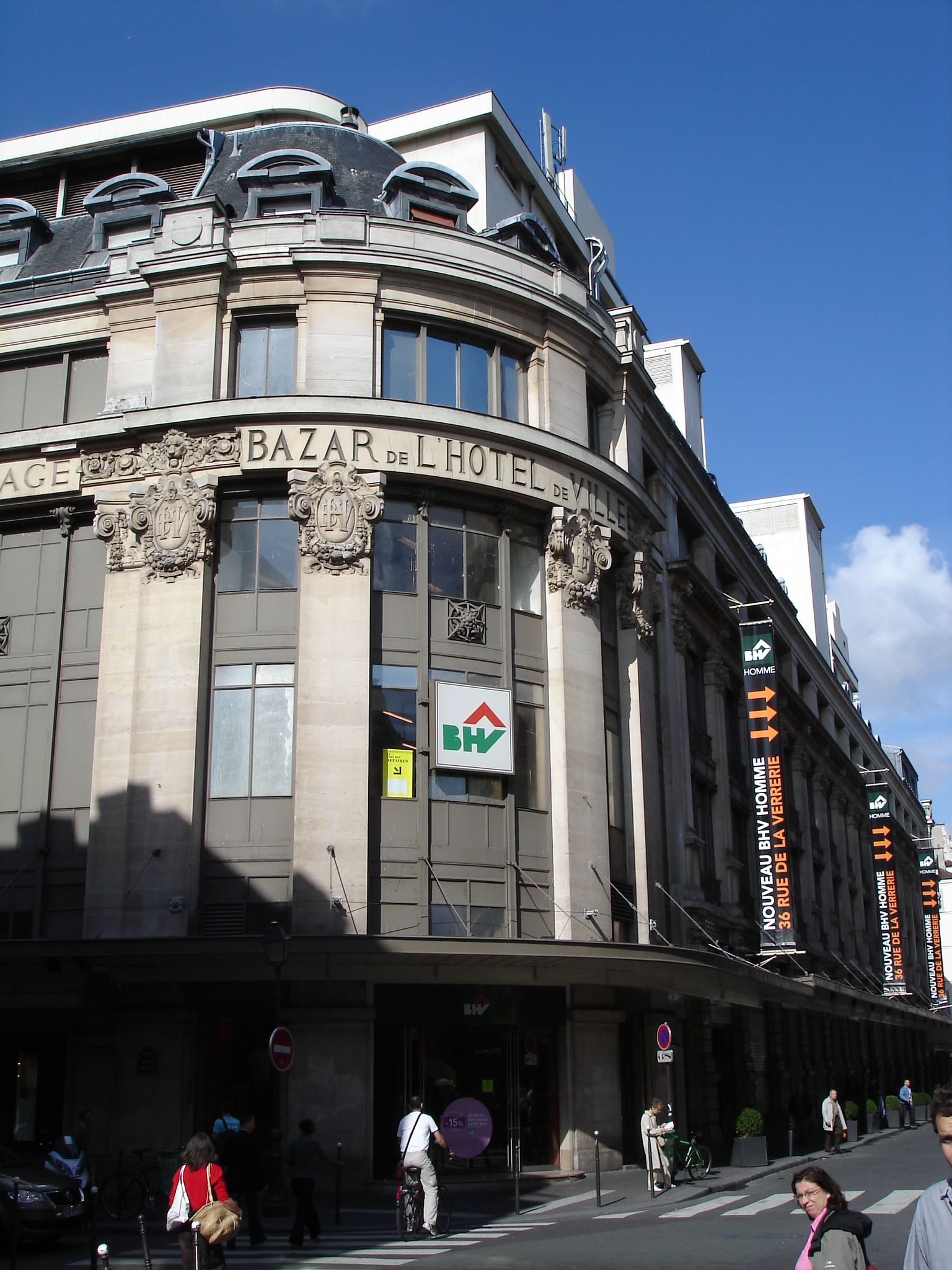
The BHV seen from the place Harvey Milk

=== Rivoli Store ===
The flagship Rivoli store is 38,000 square metres and is spread across 8 different floors with many different departments.

Rivoli Layout

- Basement: Bricolage, Paints & Drugstore
- Ground: Home, Beauty, Perfumes, Jewellery & Accessories
- First: Women's Fashion & Women's Shoes
- Second: Bookshop, Stationery, Hobbies & Luggage
- Third: Culinary, Tableware, Appliances, Delicatessen & Glassware
- Fourth: Decoration, Lighting, Candles & Furniture
- Fifth: Children's Clothing, Children's Shoes, Toys & Lingerie
- Sixth: Bedding & Bathroom
- Seventh: Le Perchoir Restaurant
- Eighth/Rooftop: Urban Farm

=== Parly 2 Store ===
The location at Parly 2 opened on the 4th of November, 1969 and has 3 floors. In 2017 BHV spent €24 Million on renovating the store.

=== Other locations ===
- Angers (since November 2025)
- Dijon (since November 2025)
- Grenoble (since November 2025)
- Le Mans (since November 2025)
- Limoges (since November 2025)
- Orléans (since November 2025)
- Reims (since November 2025)
