= Vélizy 2 =

Shopping mall in Vélizy

Coordinates: 48°46′52″N 2°13′13″E

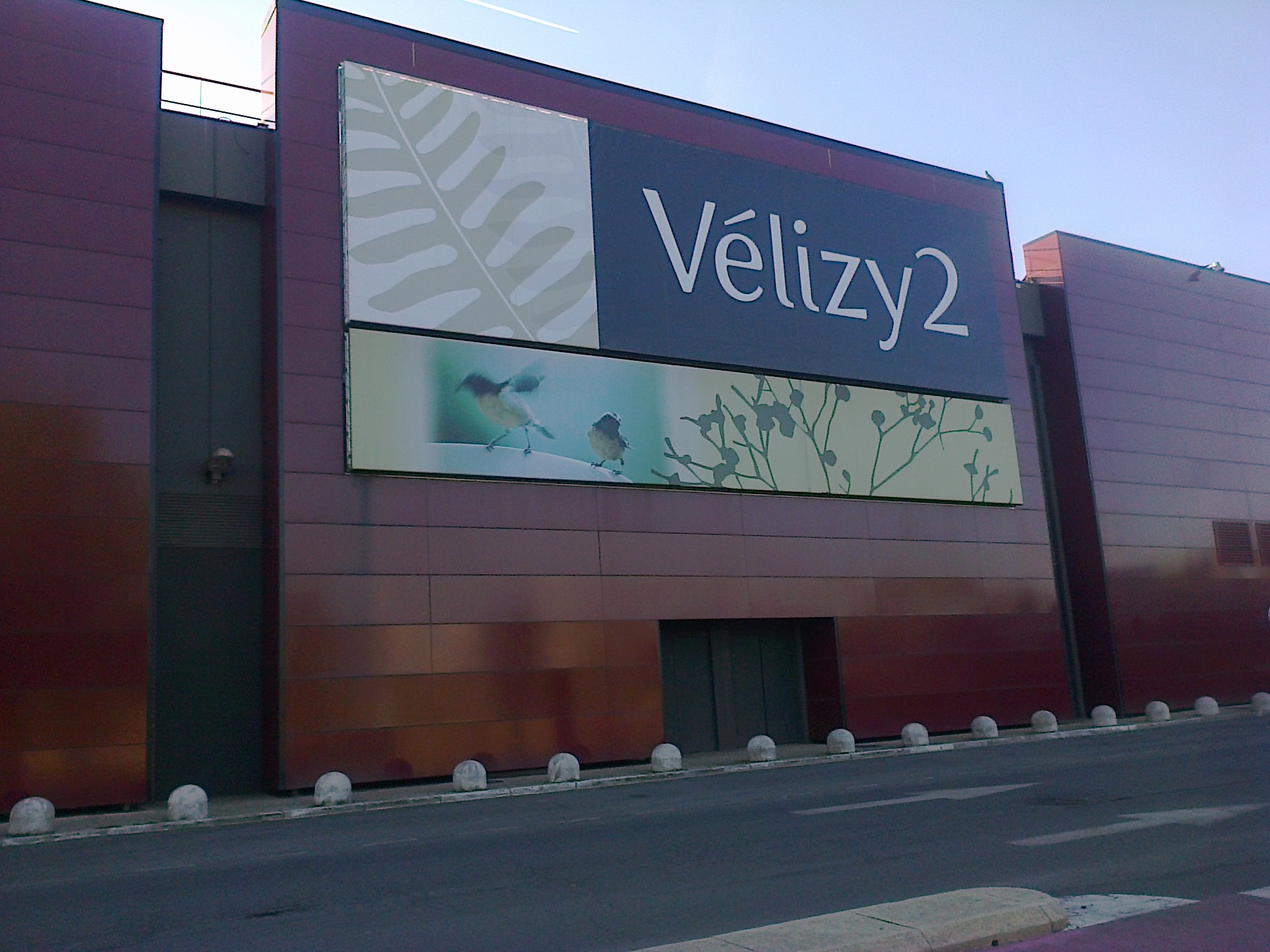
Vélizy 2 shopping complex

Vélizy 2 is a large shopping complex in Vélizy-Villacoublay, France. The complex was first opened in 1972 and has been expanded over the years and has become one of the major business and commercial precincts in Europe. The retail park is located in the town of Vélizy-Villacoublay near Paris and comprises more than 170 shops, services, restaurants and 4 cinema screens. The centre caters for over 60,000 customers a day and over 18 million customers a year, views of the main runway at Villacoublay airbase can be enjoyed from the Auchan car park.
