= Saint-Laurent-du-Var =

Commune in Provence-Alpes-Côte d'Azur, France

- Commune
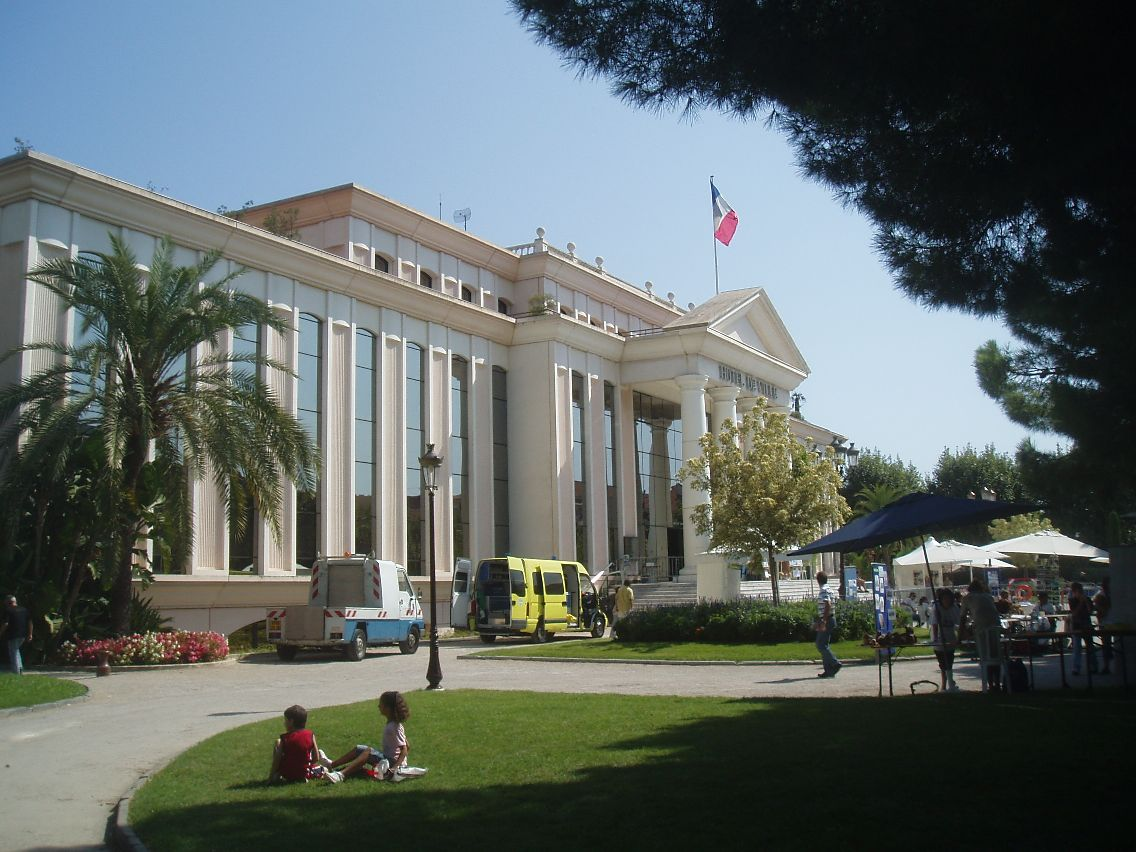
- The Hôtel de Ville

- Coat of arms
- Location of Saint-Laurent-du-Var
- Location within France Location within Provence-Alpes-Côte d'Azur
- Coordinates: 43°40′05″N 7°11′17″E
- Country: France
- Region: Provence-Alpes-Côte d'Azur
- Department: Alpes-Maritimes
- Arrondissement: Grasse
- Canton: Cagnes-sur-Mer-2
- Intercommunality: Métropole Nice Côte d'Azur

Government
  - Mayor (2026–32): Joseph Segura
- Area^{1}: 10.11 km^{2} (3.90 sq mi)
- Elevation: 17 m (56 ft)
- Highest elevation: 214 m (702 ft)
- Lowest elevation: 0 m (0 ft)
- Population (2023): 32,172
  - Density: 3,182/km^{2} (8,242/sq mi)
- Time zone: UTC+01:00 (CET)
  - Summer (DST): UTC+02:00 (CEST)
- INSEE/Postal code: 06123 /06700
- ^{1} French Land Register data, which excludes lakes, ponds, glaciers > 1 km^{2} (0.386 sq mi or 247 acres) and river estuaries.

Saint-Laurent-du-Var (French pronunciation: [sɛ̃ loʁɑ̃ dy vaʁ]; Occitan: Sant Laurenç de Var, Italian: San Lorenzo del Varo) is a commune in the Alpes-Maritimes department in the Provence-Alpes-Côte d'Azur region on the French Riviera.

== History ==
The town was founded in the 11th century when a hospice was founded under Saint Lawrence's protection. The main activity was to help passengers to cross the Var, which became a border between Kingdom of France and County of Nice in 1481. The Hôtel de Ville was completed in 1993.

== Geography ==
St. Laurent is the second-largest suburb of the city of Nice, after Cagnes-sur-Mer, in the urban community of Nice Côte d'Azur. It lies adjacent to it on the west side on the other side of the river Var.

Nowadays, the town has developed much and its population has been multiplied by ten in the last century and it is now part of Nice metropolitan area.

== Recreation ==
The suburb's location of being near Nice led to the building of CAP 3000, the Côte d'Azur's biggest mall, and an industrial zone with many dynamic activities.

The beaches include a yacht club where you can learn how to sail. There are also many water activities including sail boarding and kiting. There is a natural bird and fish conservation area opposite the Holiday Inn.

Along the promenade Flots Bleus and extending to the Port of Saint Laurent there are numerous restaurants and bars which attract many locals and tourists.

== Demographics ==
Historical population

Year	Pop.	±% p.a.
1793	293	—
1800	258	−1.80%
1806	405	+7.81%
1821	581	+2.43%
1831	751	+2.60%
1836	836	+2.17%
1841	837	+0.02%
1846	780	−1.40%
1851	824	+1.10%
1856	777	−1.17%
1861	774	−0.08%
1866	806	+0.81%
1872	713	−2.02%
1876	752	+1.34%
1881	944	+4.65%
1886	1,170	+4.39%
1891	1,230	+1.01%
1896	1,366	+2.12%
1901	1,530	+2.29%

Year	Pop.	±% p.a.
1906	1,791	+3.20%
1911	2,205	+4.25%
1921	2,523	+1.36%
1926	3,215	+4.97%
1931	4,112	+5.04%
1936	4,825	+3.25%
1946	4,006	−1.84%
1954	5,623	+4.33%
1962	8,186	+4.81%
1968	10,156	+3.66%
1975	15,503	+6.23%
1982	20,678	+4.20%
1990	24,426	+2.10%
1999	27,141	+1.18%
2007	30,290	+1.38%
2012	29,343	−0.63%
2017	28,453	−0.61%
2023	32,172	+2.07%

Source: EHESS and INSEE (1968-2023)

== Transportation ==
St. Laurent is located close to "Nice Côte d'Azur" Airport, in the eastern side of Var river, Nice. The town also has a harbor, an interchange on the motorway A8, and a railway station (Saint-Laurent-du-Var station) on the Marseille-Toulon-Nice-Ventimiglia line.

== Twin towns ==
Saint-Laurent-du-Var is twinned with:

- Landsberg am Lech (Germany)
- Siófok (Hungary)
- Waldheim (Germany)
- all the French towns named "Saint-Laurent" (95 in Metropolitan France)
- Saint-Laurent-du-Maroni (French Guiana)

== See also ==
- Nice metropolitan area
- Métropole Nice Côte d'Azur
- Communes of the Alpes-Maritimes department
