= Mercantour National Park =

French national park in Alpes-Maritimes and Alpes-de-Haute-Provence

- Parc national du Mercantour
- IUCN category II (national park)
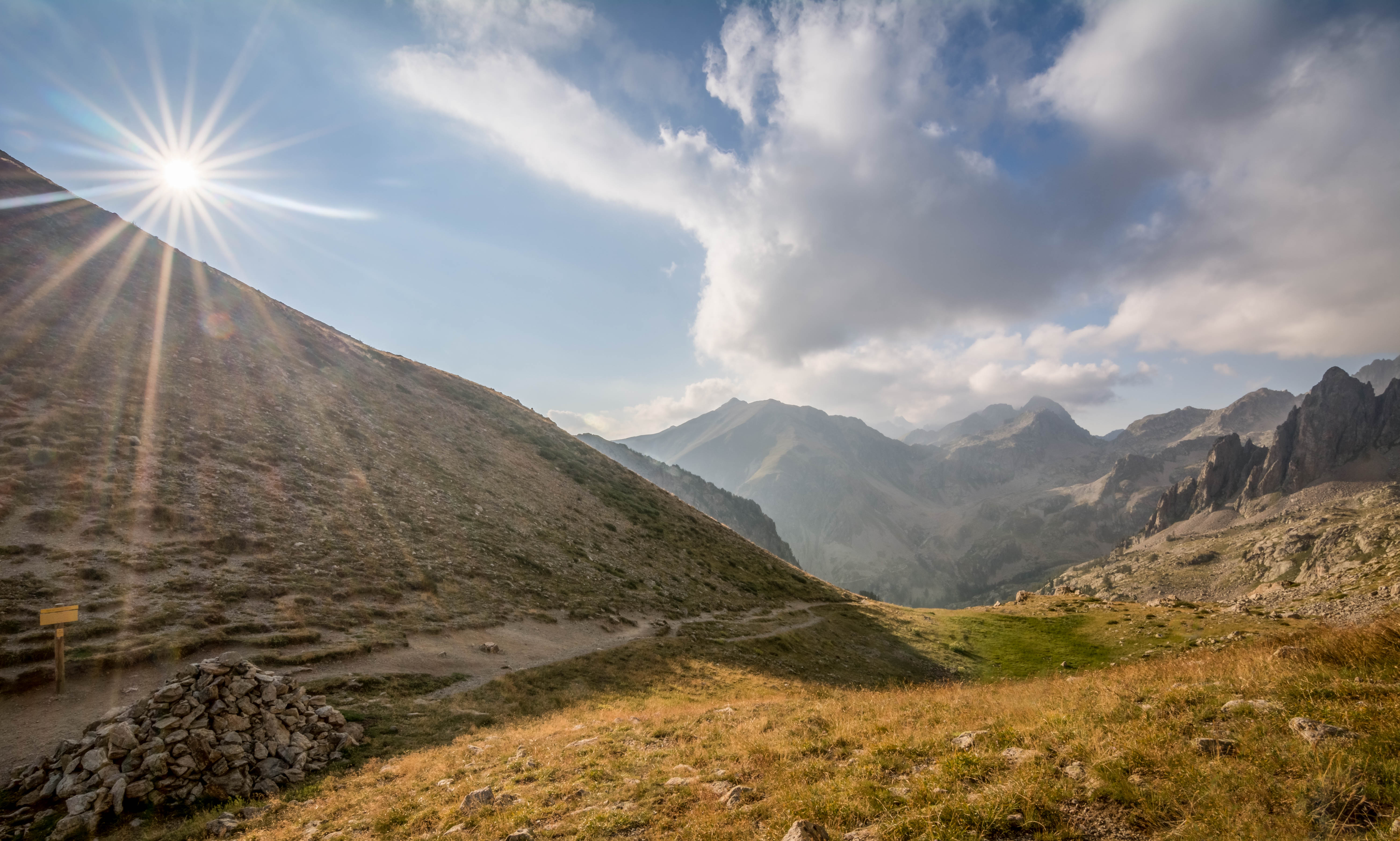
- Baisse des Cinq Lacs

- Location within France
- Location: Alpes-Maritimes and Alpes-de-Haute-Provence, France
- Nearest city: Barcelonette
- Coordinates: 44°08′34″N 7°07′39″E
- Area: 679 km^{2} (262 sq mi)
- Established: 18 August 1979
- Governing body: Parcs nationaux de France
- Website: www.mercantour.eu

Mercantour National Park (French: Parc national du Mercantour) a French national park located in the Alpes-de-Haute-Provence and Alpes-Maritimes departments. Since it was created in 1979, the park has proven popular, with 800,000 visitors annually enjoying the 600 km (372 mi) of marked footpaths and visiting its villages.

== Extent ==
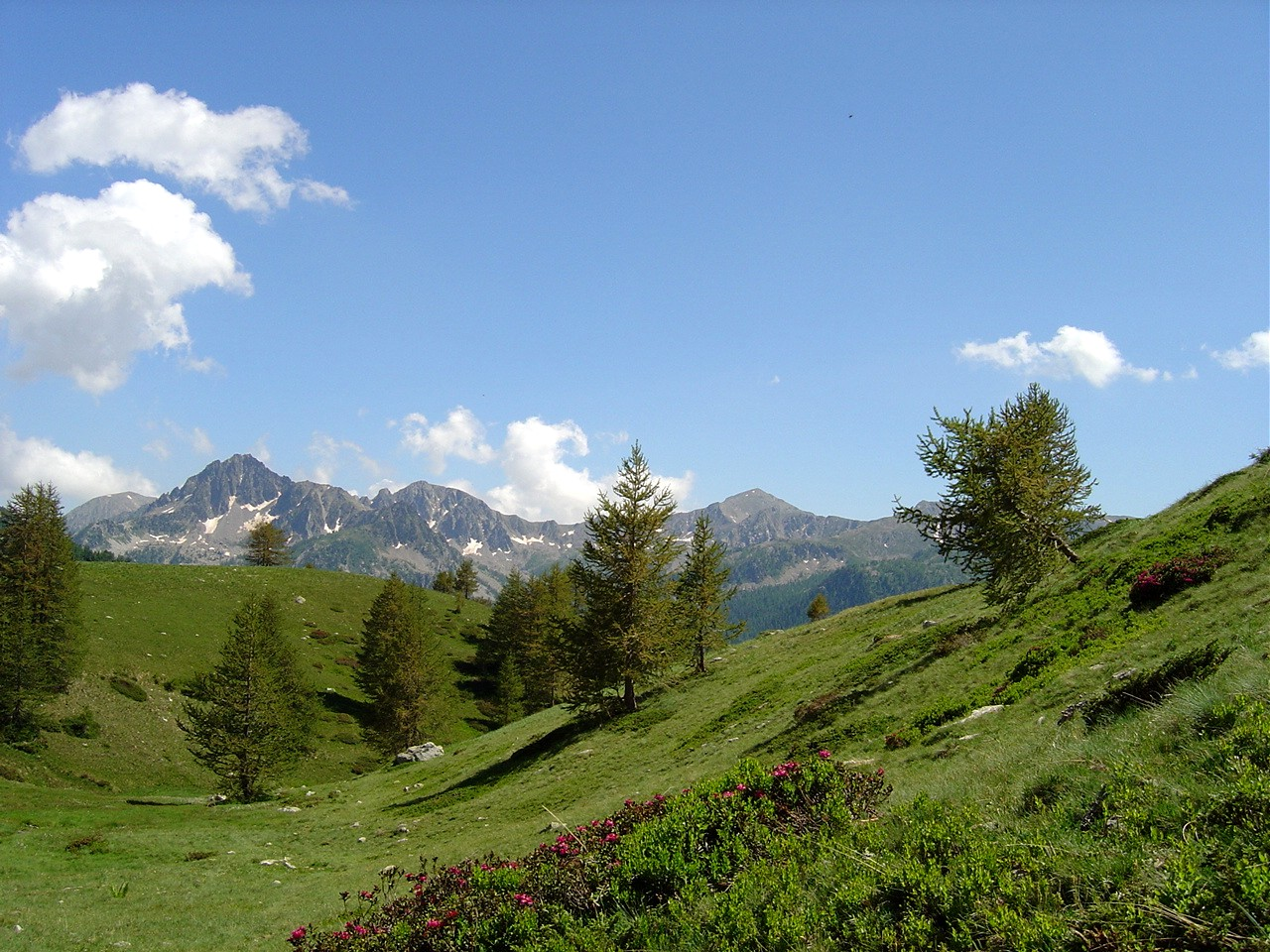
Vallon de Mollières

The protected area covers some 679 km^{2}, consisting of a central uninhabited zone comprising seven valleys: Roya, Bévéra, Vésubie, Tinée, Haut Var and Cians (in Alpes-Maritimes) plus Verdon and Ubaye (in Alpes-de-Haute-Provence), as well as a peripheral zone comprising 28 villages.

Many of them are perched villages, such as Belvédère at the entrance to the spectacular Gordolasque valley, concealing great architectural riches (numerous churches decorated with murals and altar pieces by primitive Niçois painters). More than 150 rural sites are located within the Park. Around Mont Bégo there are petroglyphs pecked out on schist and granite faces. They have been dated from the late Neolithic and Bronze Ages.

In June 2026, the entire Mercantour National Park was incorporated into the expanded Alpes Azur Mercantour International Dark Sky Reserve. The expansion increased the certified reserve from about 2,300 to 3,700 square kilometres and from 75 to 92 municipalities. It was the first International Dark Sky Reserve to formally expand its certified boundaries, extending coordinated light-pollution reduction and night-sky protection across the whole national park.

=== Valley of marvels ===
In the heart of this setting of vertiginous summits (including Cime du Gélas, the third highest mountain in the Maritime Alps at 3,143 m), lies a gem listed as a Historical Monument, the famous Vallée des Merveilles, the aptly named "valley of marvels". At the foot of Mont Bégo, climbers can admire some 37,000 petroglyphs dating back to the Bronze Age, representing weapons, cattle and human figures that are sometimes very mysterious. A less challenging destination is the Musée des Merveilles at Tende.

=== Lakes ===
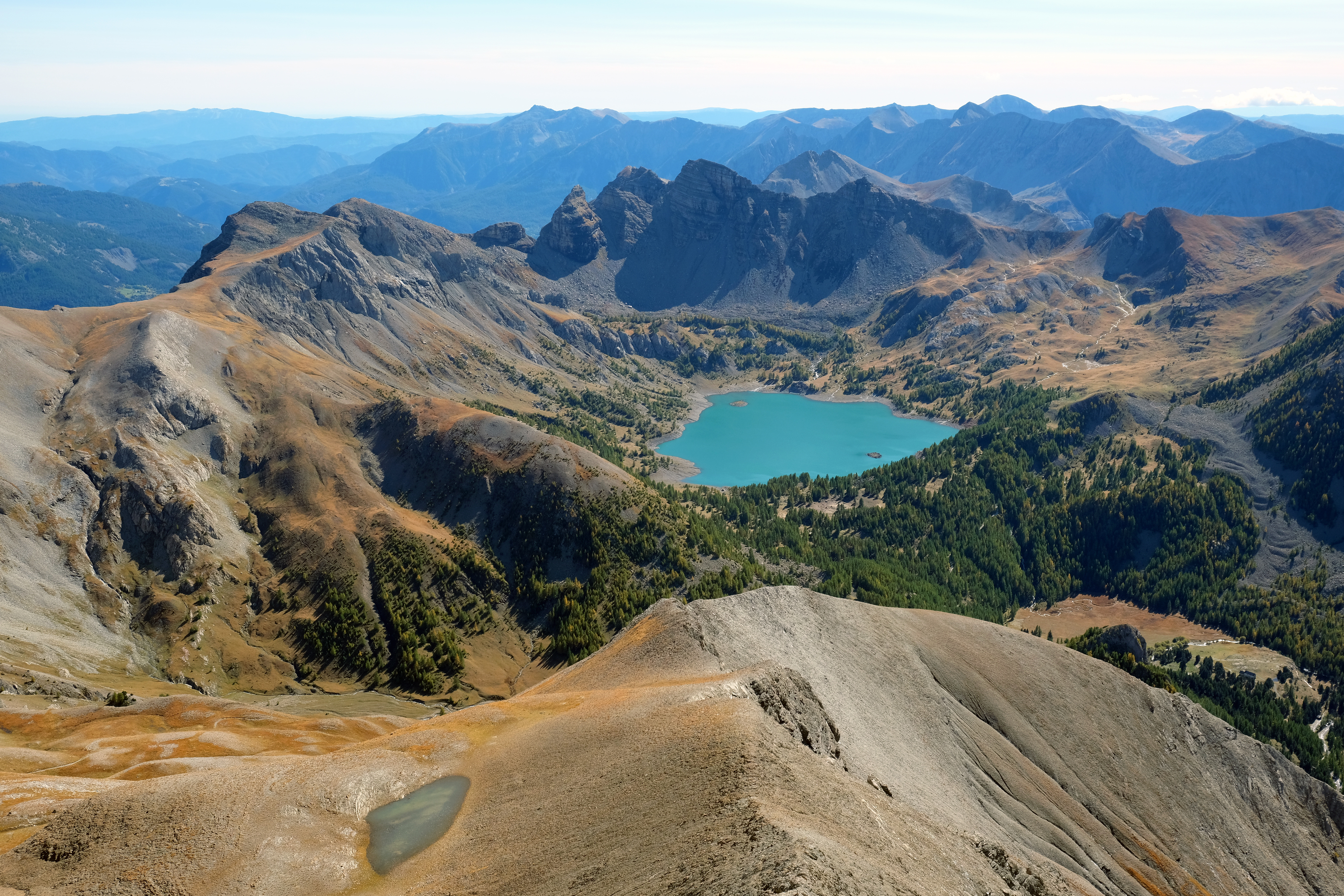
Lake Allos

Several lakes can be visited, for example the lake of Allos, the lake of the Lauzanier, the lakes of Vens, the lakes of Morgon, and the lakes of the valley of marvels.

== Flora ==
In addition to the holm oak, the Mediterranean olive tree, rhododendrons, firs, spruces, Swiss pines and above all larches, the Mercantour is also endowed with more than 2,000 species of flowering plants, 200 of which are very rare: edelweiss and martagon lily are the best known, but there is also saxifrage with multiple flowers, houseleek, moss campion and gentian offering a multi-coloured palette in the spring. The Mercantour is the site of a large-scale All Taxa Biodiversity Inventory and Monitoring programme to identify all its living species, organised by the European Distributed Institute of Taxonomy (EDIT).

== Fauna ==
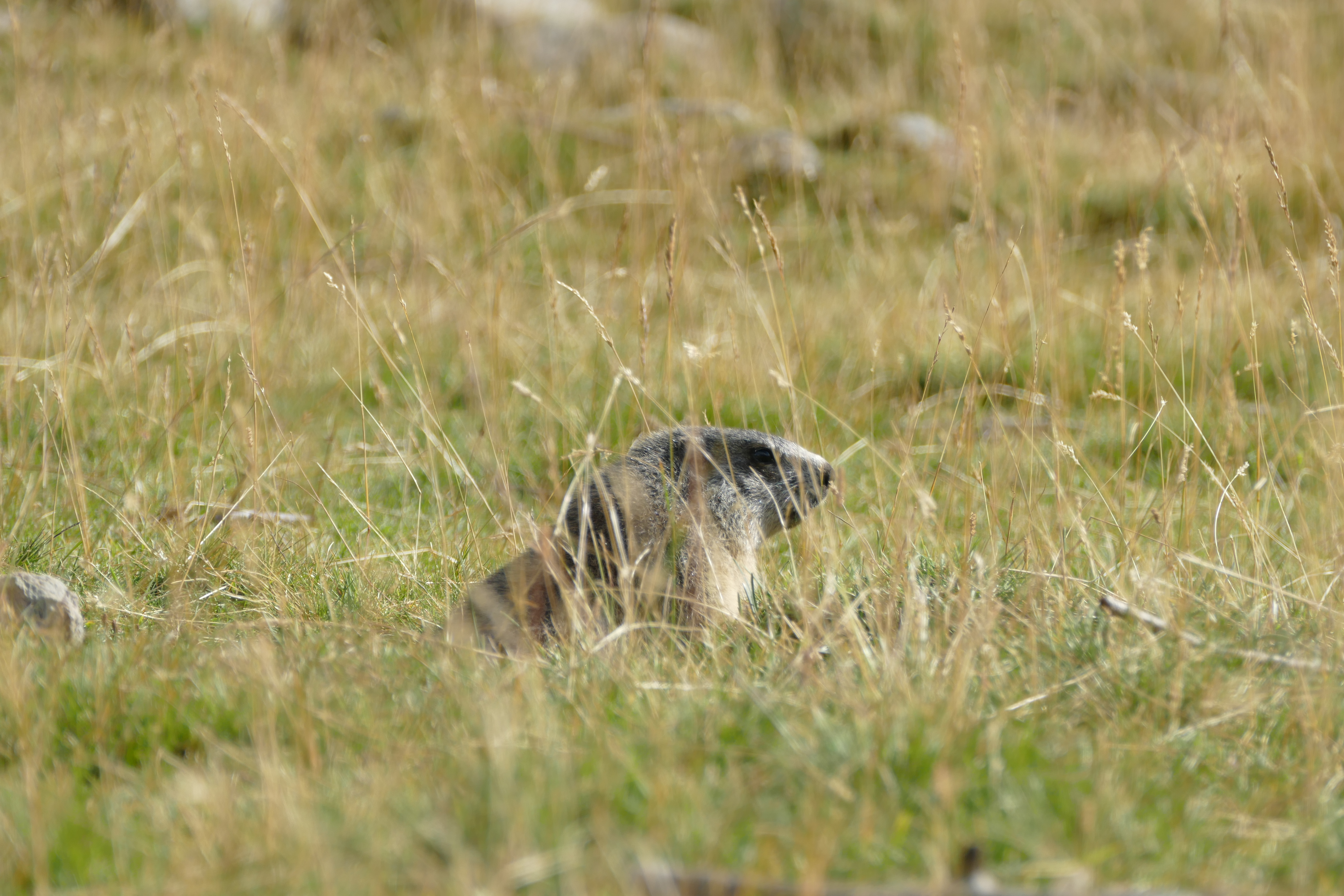
Mercantour marmot peeking out of its burrow

Walkers may easily glimpse a chamois, several thousand of which live in the park, and may often hear the whistling of marmots. The ermine is rarer (and more furtive), as are the ibex and the mouflon, which are often difficult to find. There is variety of wildlife in the Mercantour: red deer and roe deer in the undergrowth, hares and wild boars, partridges, golden eagles and buzzards, several species of butterflies. even about 50 Italian wolves.

The grey wolf naturally returned to the Mercantour in November 1992, when two individuals were observed during a wildlife count in the Mollières valley (Valdeblore) — the first confirmed sighting of the species in France since it was exterminated there in 1937. The animals had migrated unaided from Italy's Apennine wolf population via the Ligurian Alps, a natural recolonisation later confirmed by genetic analysis of scat samples rather than any human reintroduction.^{,}

A Wolves Centre welcomes visitors in Saint-Martin-Vésubie.

== See also ==
- List of national parks of France
