= Belvédère =

Commune in Provence-Alpes-Côte d'Azur, France

- Commune
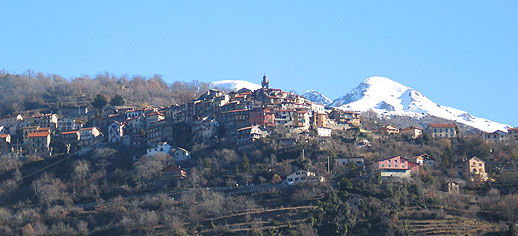
- View of Belvédère

- Coat of arms
- Location of Belvédère
- Location within France Location within Provence-Alpes-Côte d'Azur
- Coordinates: 44°00′56″N 7°19′18″E
- Country: France
- Region: Provence-Alpes-Côte d'Azur
- Department: Alpes-Maritimes
- Arrondissement: Nice
- Canton: Tourrette-Levens
- Intercommunality: Métropole Nice Côte d'Azur

Government
  - Mayor (2026–32): Paul Burro
- Area^{1}: 75.41 km^{2} (29.12 sq mi)
- Highest elevation: 3,080 m (10,100 ft)
- Lowest elevation: 575 m (1,886 ft)
- Population (2023): 601
  - Density: 7.97/km^{2} (20.6/sq mi)
- Time zone: UTC+01:00 (CET)
  - Summer (DST): UTC+02:00 (CEST)
- INSEE/Postal code: 06013 /06450
- ^{1} French Land Register data, which excludes lakes, ponds, glaciers > 1 km^{2} (0.386 sq mi or 247 acres) and river estuaries.

Belvédère (French pronunciation: [bɛlvedɛʁ]; Occitan: Barver; Italian: Belvedere) is a commune in the Vésubie valley north of Nice in the Alpes-Maritimes department in southeastern France. The village of Belvédère is located at the entrance of the Gordolasque valley on the edge of the Mercantour National Park.

Over its history the Commune of Belvédère has been part of the Kingdom of Burgundy, the Kingdom of Sardinia, the First French Empire, the Duchy of Savoy and since 1860 modern France. The last battle on French soil in the Second World War, the Battle of Authion, was fought on the hills above the village.

The world famous novel Darkness at Noon was completed in a villa nearby and the television series Belle and Sebastian was shot in and around the village.

== History ==
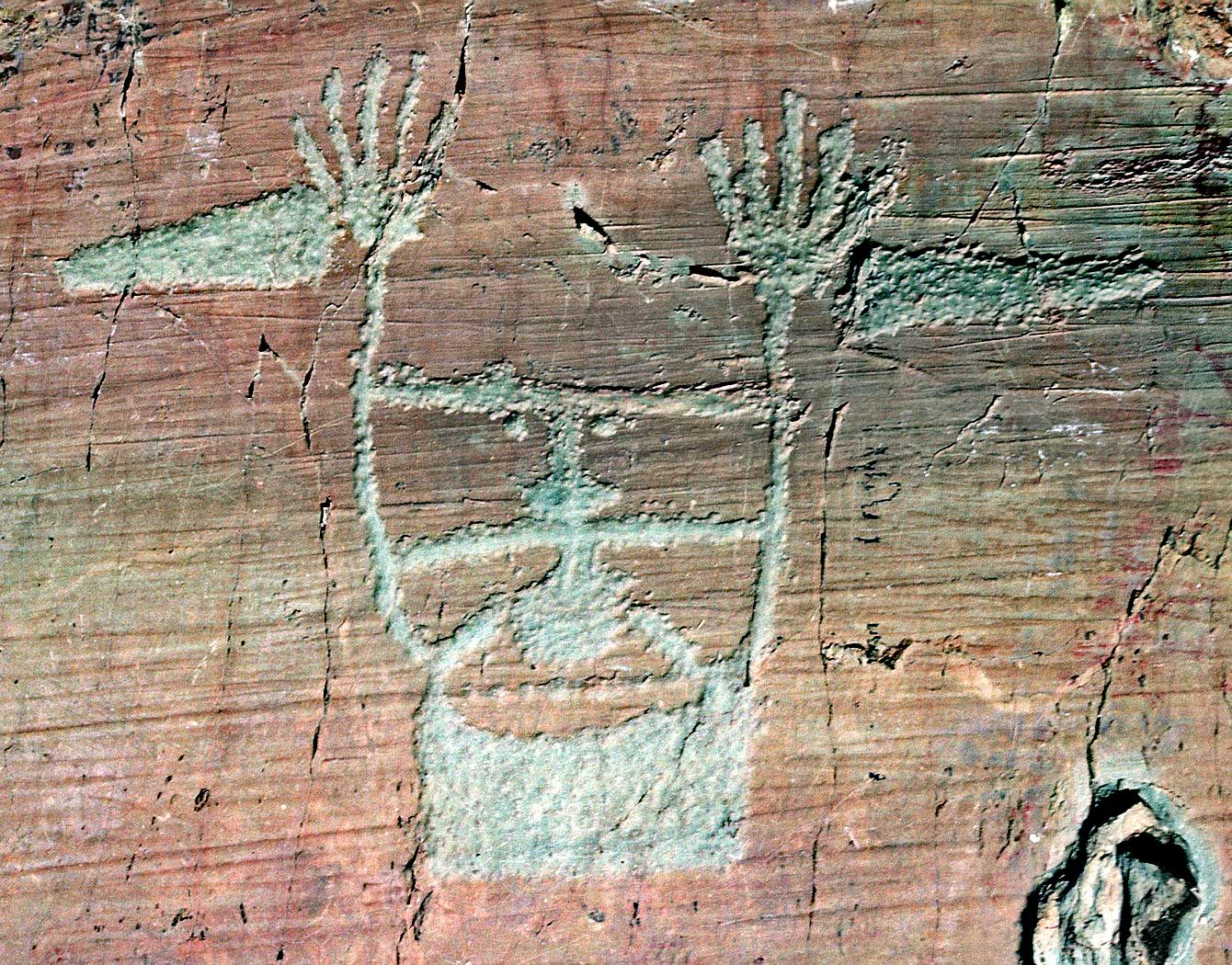
"Le Sorcier " one of the 30,000 carvings in the vallée de Merveilles

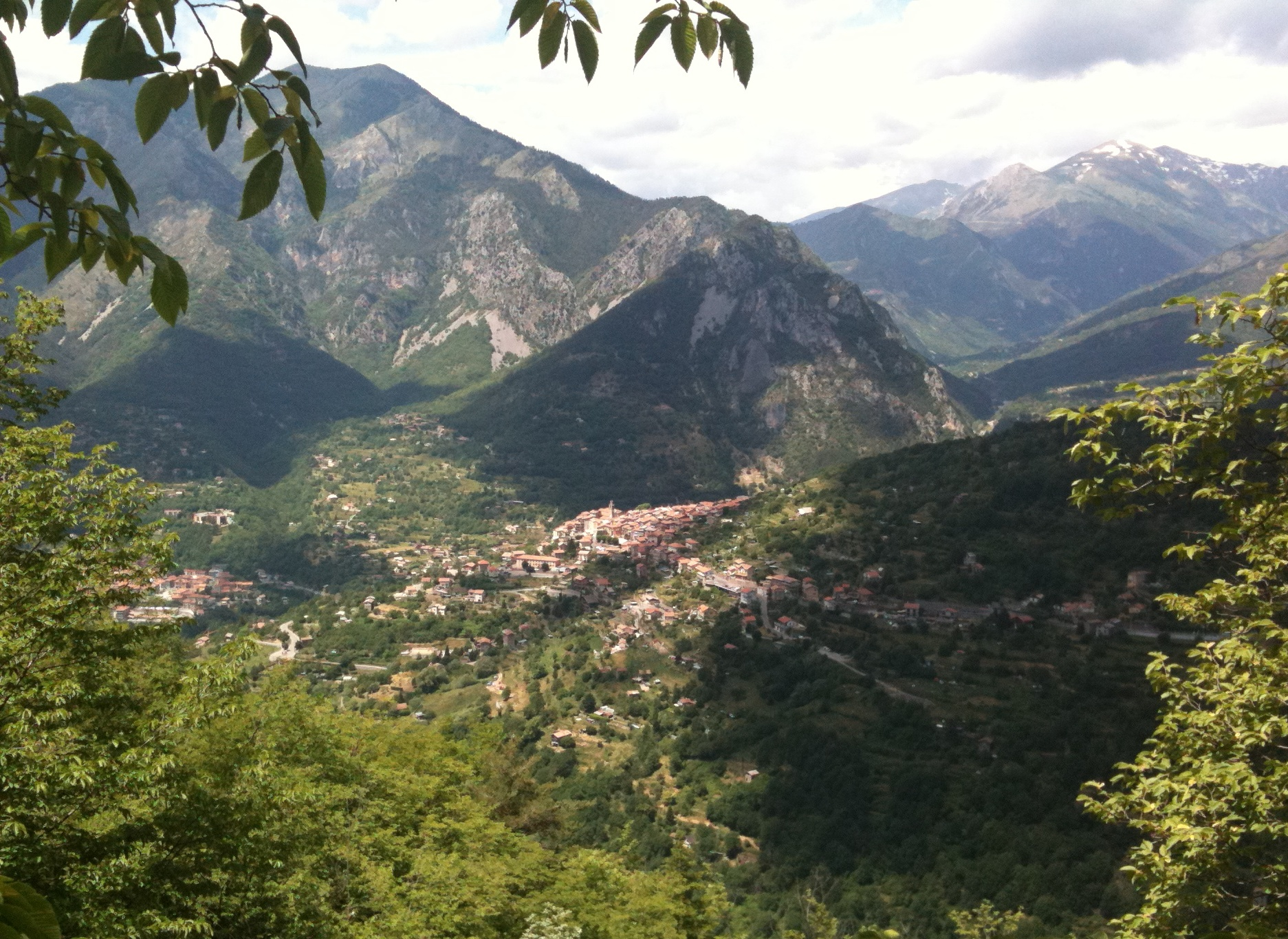
Belvédère from Mont Pela looking north up the Vésubie valley

=== The Bronze Age ===
Belvédère lies immediately to the west of Mont Bégo, known as the sacred mountain in Mercantour National Park. For thousands of years, from the Stone Age till the Iron Age, the first inhabitants of Europe carved more than thirty thousand graffiti on the stones of the Vallée des Merveilles on the slopes of the mountain. There are some vestiges of ancient fortifications behind the current church, which represent the prehistoric beginnings of the village.

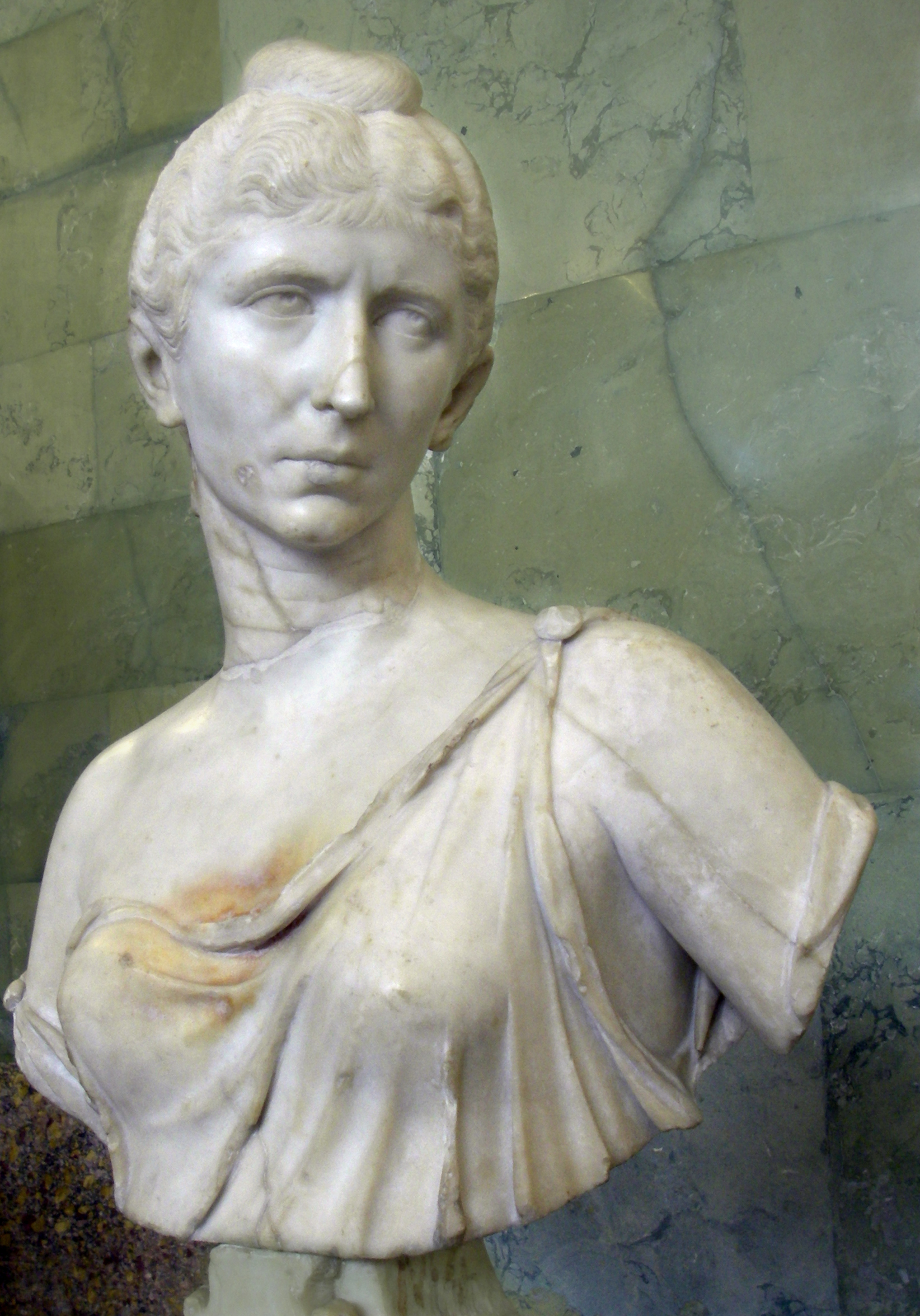
Cornelia Salonina took the waters nearby.

=== The Gauls ===
In 500 BC the Gauls infiltrated the Ligurian coast and arrived in the mountains around. The inhabitants of Massalia (Marseilles) founded colonies along the coast: Antibes, Monaco, Nice. Farmers spread inland raising vines and olives without however reducing the independence of the mountain dwellers

=== The Romans ===
The Romans crossed the Alps Maritimes to secure a passage to Nice & Marseilles and to fight in Spain. In 125 BC they annexed the inland areas to found the Roman province of Provence followed by the Alpine regions as far as Tyrol. Belvedere was occupied and noble Romans of Cimez (Nice) who spent summers in the area and developed the thermal baths at the nearby mountain village of Berthemont-les-Bains. Reputedly Conrelia Solenina wife of the third century emperor Galienus(c. 218 – 268) and mother of Valerian II, Saloninus, and Marinianus visited the baths.

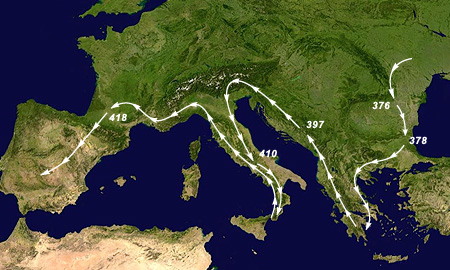
Migrations of the main column of the Visigoths passed through

=== The Barbarian Invasions ===
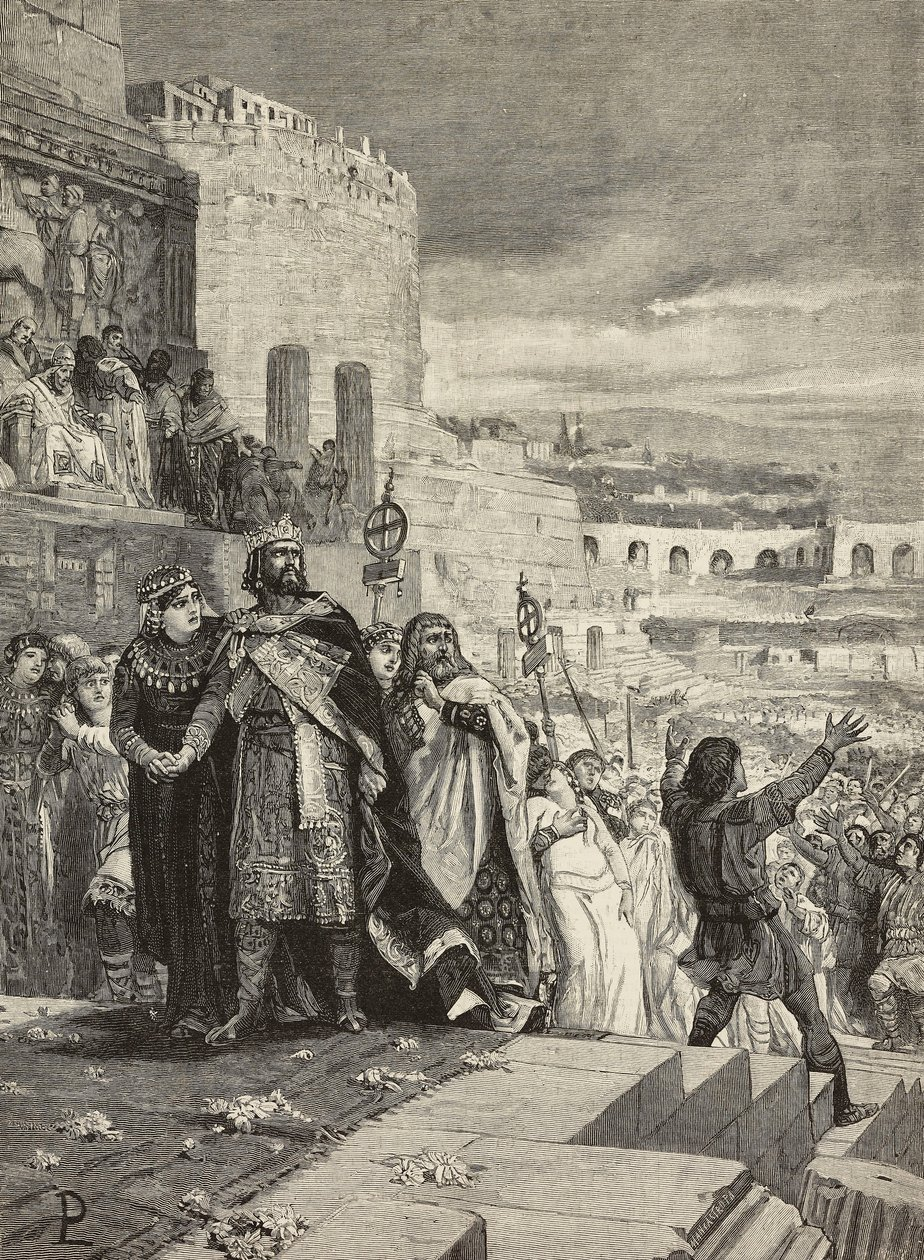
The wedding of Hugh, king of Italy & Count of Provence. The first of the Counts who would dominate the region during the Middle Ages

In the 5th century, the Germans finally overwhelmed the Western Roman Empire. They disputed Provence with the Visigoths, then the Ostrogoths installed themselves, followed by the Lombards and finally the Francs, who organised and administered the region and repulsed the raiding Sassanids(Arabs) in the 7th & 8th centuries, whose attacks penetrating as far as the Vesubie.

=== Under the Counts of Provence ===
At the dawn of the millennium during the chaotic period at the end of the Carolingian era the area was part the kingdom of Burgundy. Rudolf II (880–937), was ruler of Upper Burgundy (912–937), Lower Burgundy (Provence) (933–937) and also ruled Italy for nearly four years (923–926). In 926 the Italian nobility turned against him and requested that Hugh of Arles, Comte d'Arles, the effective ruler of Provence (or Lower Burgundy), rule them instead. Rudolf returned to Upper Burgundy, assuring Hugh's coronation as King of Italy.

The Counts would dominate the region for the duration of the Middle Ages. It was the feudal era with a lord or Seigneur for each village, but most areas maintained their autonomy and Luceram, Utelle and Saint Martin Vesubie, like Belvedere, administered themselves. After the death of Queen Jeanne (1382), Amadeus VII Count of Savoy, the Red Earl, taking advantage of a war of succession in Provence negotiated the succession of Nice to Savoy. Ruined by war, the inhabitants of Nice and the countries aligned themselves with the policy of John Grimaldi and accepted the protection of the House of Savoy through the Treaty of Saint Pons, known as the Revocation of Nice to Savoy.

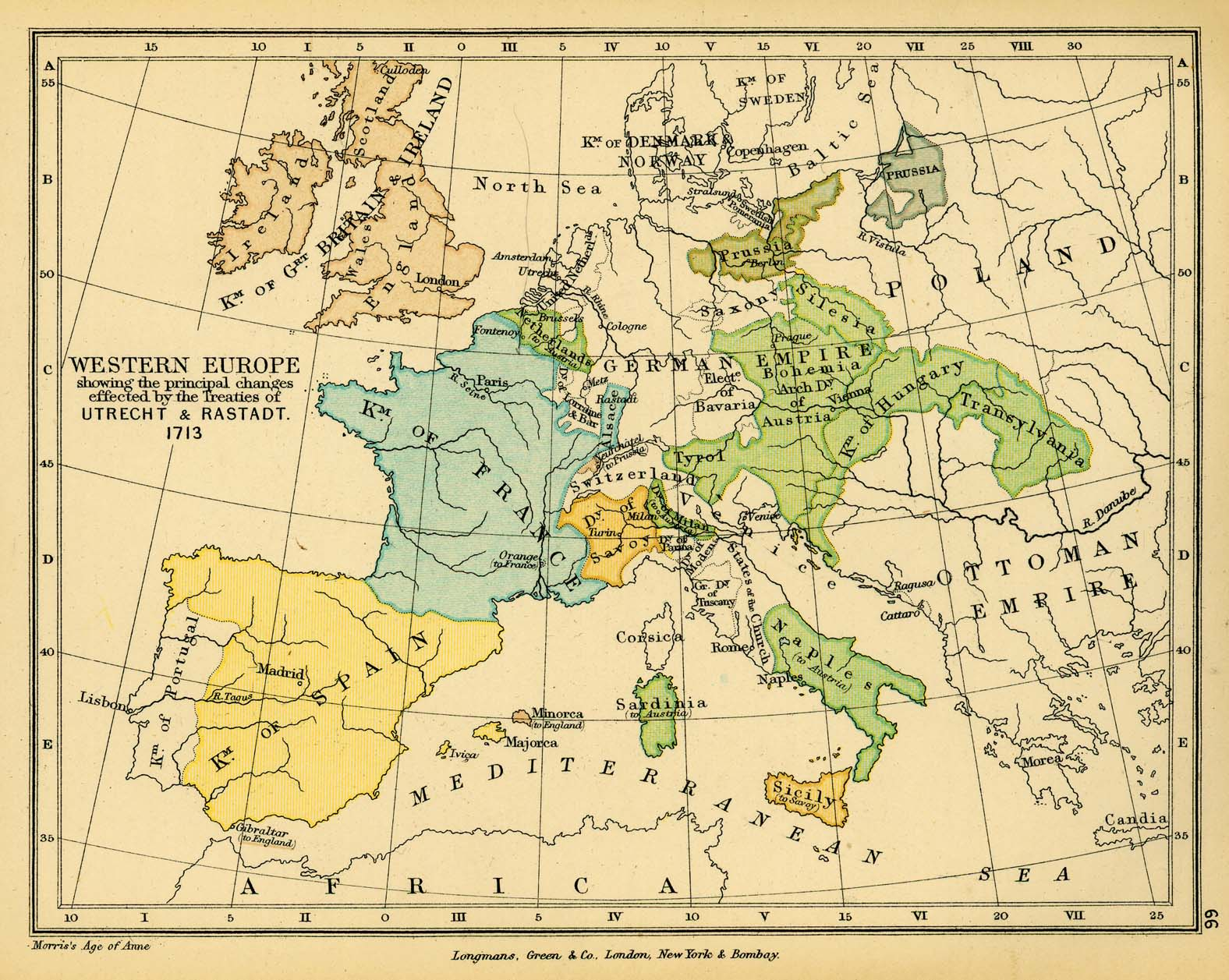
Western Europe's borders after the Treaties of Utrecht, which took Bevedere into the Kingdom of Sardinia.

=== The Princes of Savoy ===
The Princes of Savoy were French by race and language and Belvedere remained a French village. But for the majority of the period from 1388 until 1713 the successors of the Red Earl, allied themselves with enemies of France. As a result, the "Pays Nicois" was crossed by hostile armies and subjected to incessant devastation, particularly following the battles between Charles V and Francis 1st (1494–1547). This unhappy situation continued off and on until after the war of Spanish Succession when at the Treaty of Utrecht (1713), Louis XIV of France and Philip V of Spain, on the one hand, and representatives of Queen Anne of Great Britain, the Duke of Savoy, and the United Provinces on the other and divided up Spain's European empire. Savoy received Sicily and parts of the Duchy of Milan, while Charles VI (the Holy Roman Emperor and Archduke of Austria, received the Spanish Netherlands, the Kingdom of Naples, Sardinia, and the bulk of the Duchy of Milan. The crown of Sardinia was awarded by the Treaty of The Hague to King Victor Amadeus II of Savoy to compensate him for the loss of the crown of Sicily to Austria and enabling him to retain the title of a king. The new kingdom with its capital in Turin included Sardinia, Savoy, Piedmont, and Nice. Belvédère remained part of the Kingdom of Sardinia until 1860.

=== Under the Sardinian Regime ===
During this period Belvedere lived under a foreign flag: however, the Pays Nicois benefited from the general peace and progress. The beautiful countryside, mild climate, and verdant agriculture attracted, all along the coast, rich residents which benefited many of the villages. Cultural life developed, but villages like Belvedere stayed isolated and life remained primitive without passable roads or commerce. Belvedere, like its neighbours, retreated into itself and in effect formed a little independent republic. The French Revolution of 1789 brought a disruption, which the people supported without getting any benefits from it.

=== The Revolution and a return to France ===
Situated just over the frontier of France, from which it was separated by the Var & the Esteron, the Nicoise region became a refuge and place of conspiracies for the French émigrés: nobles, royal officers & priests who hoped to re-establish the royal family in France. A French army crossed the Var in September 1792 and freed the country from the Comte de Nice. Many of the inhabitants, who were secret Francophiles and partisans of the republic welcomed the return to France. This would be the beginning of a bloody confrontation with the Austro-Sardinian armies, which pillaged and caused havoc in many of the villages in the hills and valleys like Belvédère.

In The high valleys of the Gordolasque and the Vesubie, the most important battles unfolded, interrupted only by winter and the difficulties of communication. Belvedere was occupied, requisitioned, bombarded, taken and retaken by the French and Austro-Sards alternatively.

........in the case of Belvedere. On 2 March 1793,General Brunet republican troops based in Saint-Julien, assaulted the village: "the soldiers quickly climbed the escaladèrent terraces, planted with olive trees that made them immune artillery fire and musketry" the Sardinian troops were forced to retreat hastily to Saint-Blaise, Saint-Martin, the Col de fenestration and even Entracque. With Belvedere, the whole valley Vésubie who fell into the hands of Republicans. The success only lasted 6 months. In September 1793, the village suffered violent attacks from the Col de Raus; the redoubts of Saint-Julien, Vesca Del Cairo and Saint-Sauveur was the scene of fierce battles. On September 8, Belvedere fell again, and it was not until April 1794, with the Vésubie, the village was retaken"

The fall of Robespierre brought the fighting to an end in May 1794, but the comté de Nice was back in French hands. After the Austrians lost at Mondovi, which was fought on 21 April 1796 between the French army of Napoleon Bonaparte and the army of the Kingdom of Sardinia-Piedmont. The French won the battle and quickly forced King Victor Amadeus III to sue for peace. The Sardinians capitulated and at the treaty of Turin on 15 May 1796, Savoy and the comté de Nice were returned to France. Belvedere was back in France.

=== Under the 1st Empire ===
The empire was accepted by Plebiscite. The Nice Arrondissement voted yes by 3,488 to 2 nos, while Puget Theniers had 2,818 yes to 3 no votes. The department was enriched by the addition of the arrondissement of San Remo ( Saorge, La Brigue, Perinaldo, Taggia, Ventimille and Bordighera)

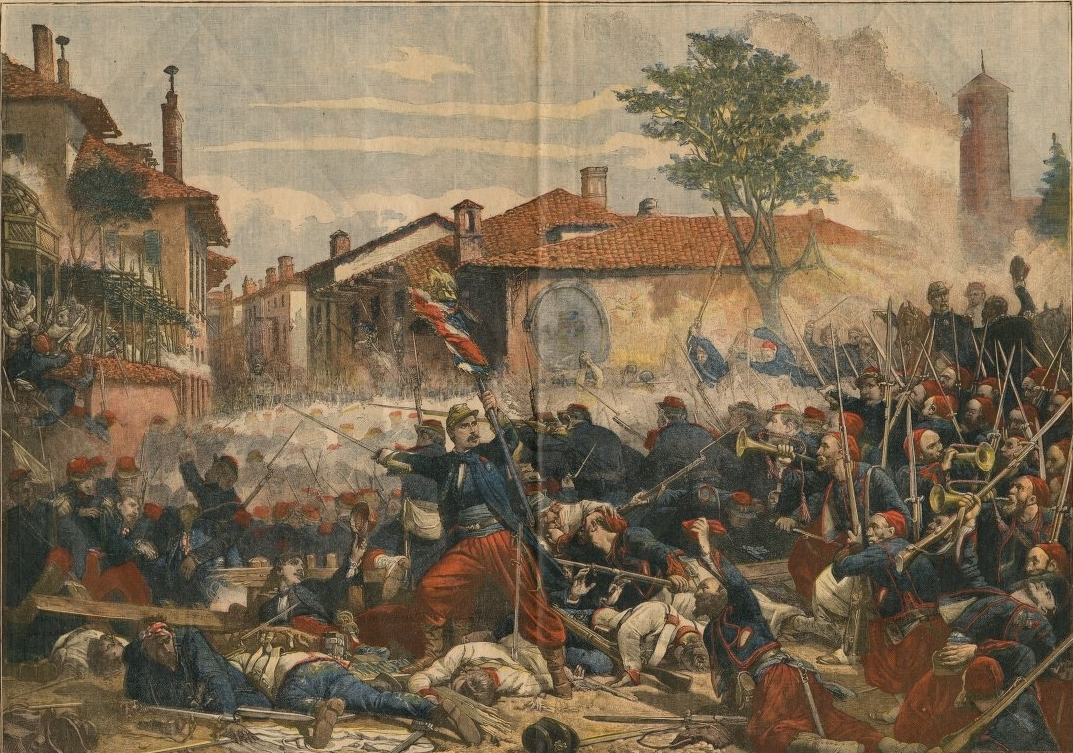
The Battle of Magenta in 1859 led to the return of the Comte de Nice to France on condition of a favourable plebiscite

In Belvedere the Raynardi family was en-nobled. Francois Felix Raynardi, comte de Belvedere. Capt in Regiment de Nice 1795, was created Baron of the Empire in 1810 and after the restoration created Marechal in 1816.

The peace that reigned there favoured peace and prosperity, but many of Belvederois men went to die on the battlefields of Europe.

=== Return of the Sardinians ===
Napoleon was defeated in 1815, the Sardinians represented by Victor Emmanuel 1st restored the ancient regime. However, the republican experience had borne fruits. Everywhere voices were raised claiming more liberty and reattachment to France. Victor Emmanuel dreamed of a united Italy and appealed to Napoleon III. Too weak to take on Austria the King of Piedmont allied with France to declare war in 1859.

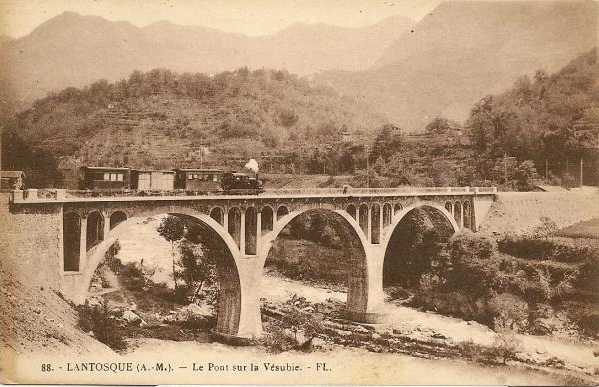
The tramway from Plan du Var to Saint-Martin-Vesubie, which ran from 1909 to 1929 and transformed access from Belvedere to the coast

The Austrians were definitively beaten at Vaincue at The Battle of Magenta on 4 June 1859 during the Second Italian War of Independence, resulting in a French-Sardinian victory under Napoleon III against the Austrians under Marshal Ferencz Gyulai. The Franco-Piedmontese coalition consisted in overwhelming majority of French troops (1,100 Piedmontese and 58,000 French). Their victory can, therefore, be considered as mostly a French victory. The French wanted to obtain what the Belvederois and the other inhabitants of the comte de Nice and wished for so long.

=== The empire strikes back ===
By the treaty of Turin on 24 March 1860 the King of Piedmont ceded to Napoleon III Savoy and the Comte de Nice on condition of a favourable plebiscite. On 15 April there was a triumphant result for France. Of 89 communes, 79 replied unanimously in 10 only where there some nos. On 14 June the Sardinian flag was replaced by the French. Belvedere retrieved its nationality, lost in 1713, found in 1794, lost again in 1815 and retrieved definitively in 1860. There was one shadow, which was not removed until victory in WWII. Several communes in the high vesubie remained an Italian enclave for another 87 years until 1947 as a hunting reserve for his majesty the king of Italy. There is no war, which does not leave sad souvenirs. The Communes of Saint Sauveur, Isola, Rimplas, Valdeblore, Saint MartinVesubie and Belvedere were part of the southern side of a remarkable line of frontier forts of 1860. Belvedere had to accept the loss of territory of all of the north part of the Gordolasque valley from the Cascade du ray between the Cime de la Valette and the Celle du south Capelet. This territory was reserved for royal hunts until it was submitted by the Italians in 1947 and re-established under the title of the Commune of Belvedere.

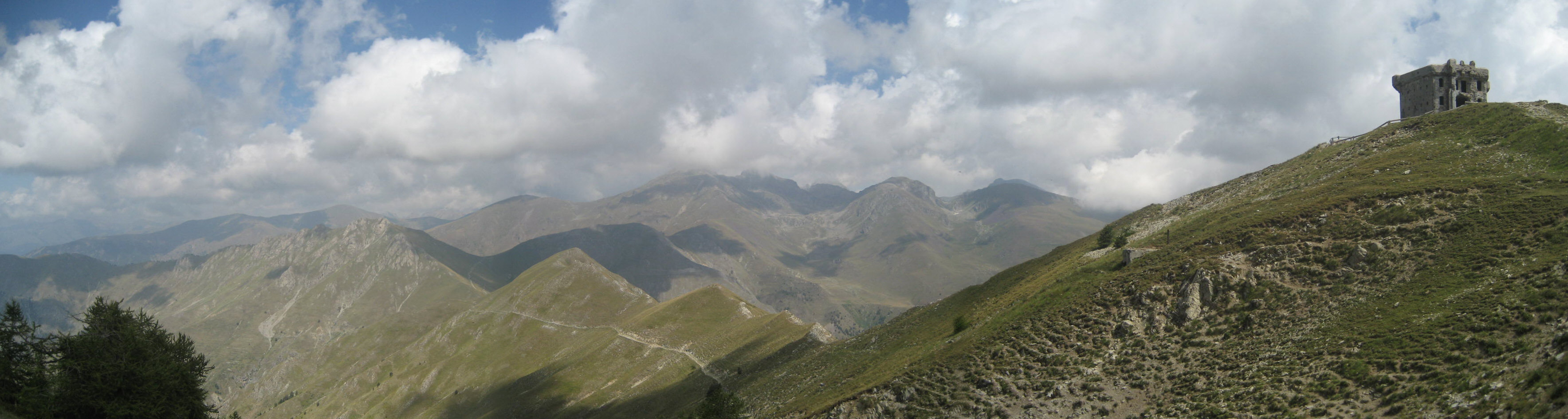
La redoute des Trois communes (2080 m) to the East and above Belvédère, scene of the last battle of WWII on French soil

=== The last occupation ===
With the rise of fascism in Italy a new menace arrived at the frontier as the Italians, encouraged by Hitler, made their presence felt. Their occupation only was terminated by the final defeat of the German army.

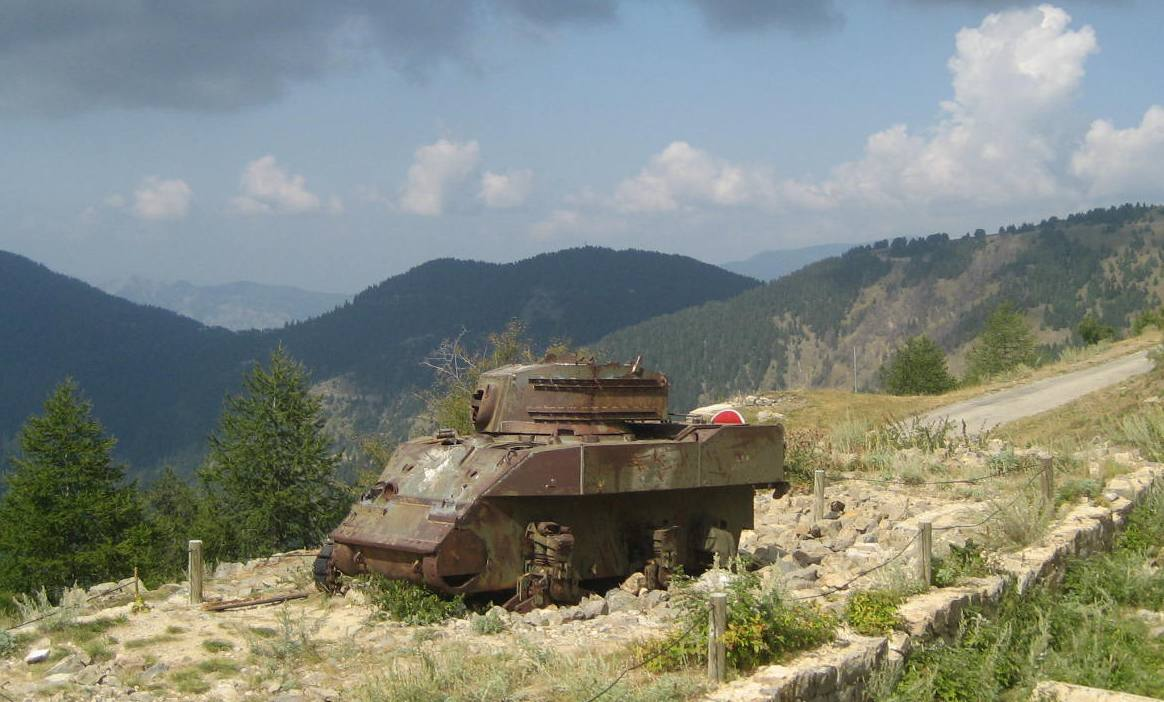
Remnants of war still in evidence over 50 years after the battle on the Massif de l'Authion above Belvédère

In the spring of 1945 the Authion massif above Belvédère was occupied by the 34th DI and troops of German mountain brigade in a network of fortifications: Forca (2078 m), Three Communes redoubt (2080 m), Plan Caval (1932 m) and fort Mille Fourches (2042 m). On 10 April 1945 the French 1st free French division (MFO) (BIMP), Pacific marine infantry battalion units and mechanized elements of the 1st Regiment fusiliers sailors, supported by artillery and aviation, launched an assault on German positions from the South. After a difficult fight, the Mille Fourches fort fell on 11 April, followed by Forca and Caval. Finally on the 12th, the redoubt of Three Communes was taken by a tank supported by five volunteer soldiers. At the end of a perilous ascent, Corporal Césaire Le Mercier, a Breton belonging to the 1st BIMP made it into the fort and emerged with 38 prisoners. The entire German front collapsed on 24 April 1945.

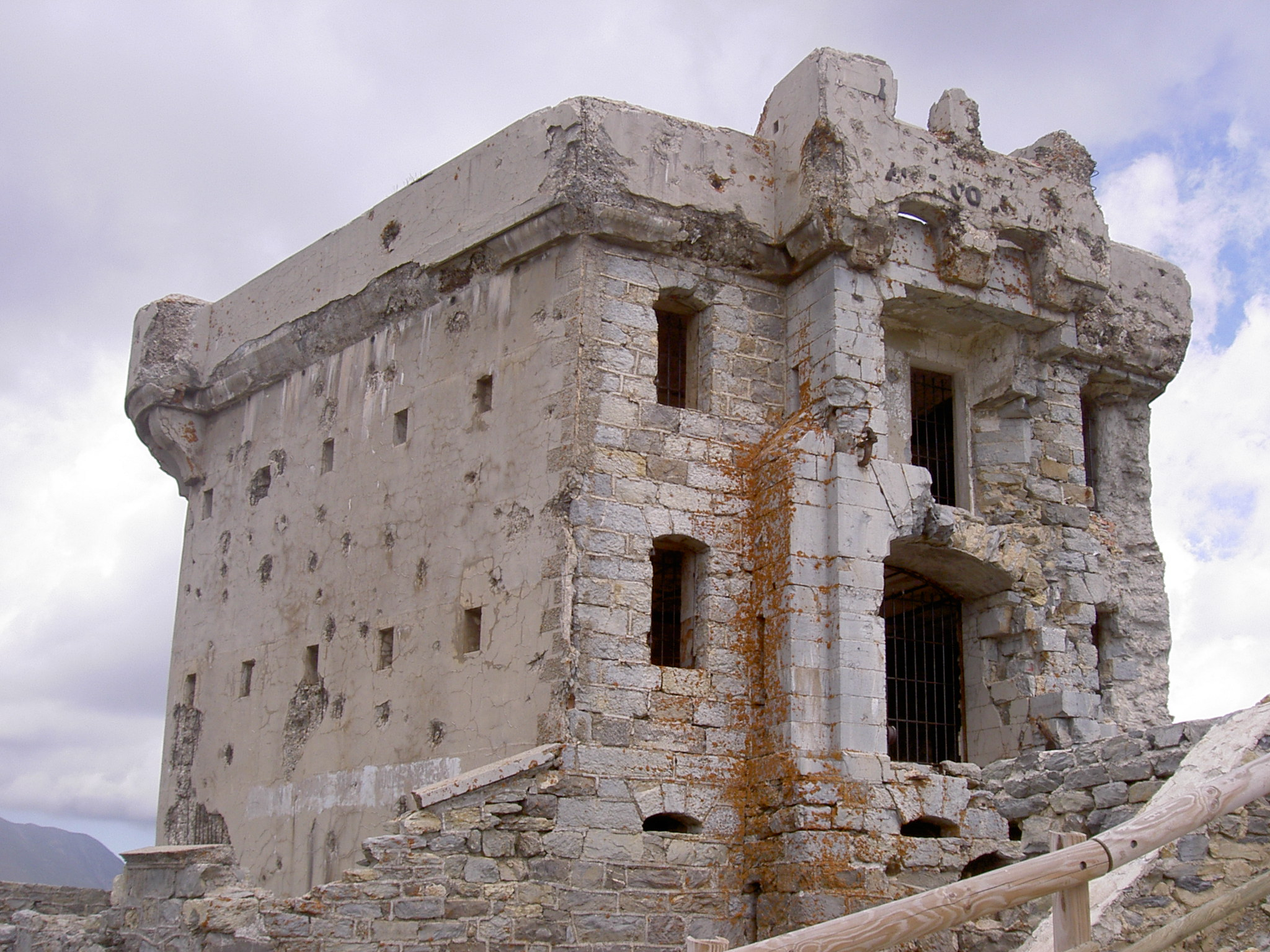
The Redoute des Trois Communes showing battle damage

Hundreds of soldiers from both sides died in this battle (273 killed, wounded 644), one of the last on French territory. It allowed French troops to continue to Piedmont following the orders of General de Gaulle's who wished to occupy territory with a view to obtaining border changes in future peace negotiations. This French attitude led to tensions and hostilities with the American allies, who were keen to prevent the dismemberment of the Italian territories by vengeful victors. Belvédère was at one point evacuated and then reoccupied.

=== The definitive return to France ===
On 19 February 1947 the "Big Four" victors signed a peace treaty with Italy finally exorcising the Fascist regime. The relevant Communes regained their territory. Tende and Brigue returned to France. Belvédère returned definitively and completely to her motherland.

== Darkness at Noon ==
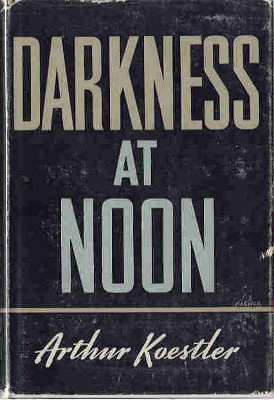

Arthur Koestler completed his world famous novel, Darkness at Noon, when he stayed just outside Belvédère on the road to old Roquebillière. He visited the area with his companion, Daphne Hardy Henrion, in the summer 1939 staying first at the San Sebastian Hotel and then renting a villa nearby until they were forced to return to Paris by the German invasion of France. He wrote about his experiences in the Vesubie valley in the first chapter of his novel, Scum of the Earth (book)

Darkness at Noon was rated one of the 100 most influential novels of the later half of the 20th century by Le Monde. It was also rated 8th in the modern library's 100 best books of the 20th century.

== Belle and Sebastian ==
Belvédère together with the Gordolasque valley was used as the location for the 1965 television series Belle et Sébastien based on the novel by Cécile Aubry about a six-year-old boy named Sébastien and his dog Belle, a Pyrenean mountain dog, who live in a small French Alpine mountain village on the French side of the border with Italy. The series was translated and broadcast by the BBC. A Japanese anime version, Meiken Jolie was made nearly two decades later and also a feature film in 2017. The Glasgow based pop group, Belle and Sebastian, were named after the original TV series.

The annual Transhumance in Belvédère.The seasonal migration between valley and high pastures

== Prominent citizens and miscellaneous facts ==
Andre Laurenti (died 1609) Professor at the University of Montpellier, presented at court by Le comtesse de Tonnerre in 1589, appointed as doctor to the King. 1603 appointed chancellor of the faculty of medicine chosen as doctor to Marie de' Medici. 1606 appointed "Archiatre" (doctor to the King) of Henry IV.

Honore Laurenti (died 1612) Royal Advocate General for 20 years amongst several important duties he gave a funeral oration for Marguerite of Austria, queen of Spain who died in Paris in 1611.

Francois Felix Raynardi (died 1832) Comte de Belvedere. Fought at Massena (aug 1793) as general of a brigade. See text above.

Dick Rivers (born 1945) alias Hervé Forneris French rock star; founder of the "Wild Cats".

The film Le Cas du docteur Laurent starring Jean Gabin was made in 1957 largely on location at the nearby town of Saint-Martin-Vésubie and many local scenes are used.

== Population ==
Historical population
Year	Pop.	±% p.a.
1968	501	—
1975	430	−2.16%
1982	536	+3.20%
1990	519	−0.40%
1999	495	−0.52%
2007	677	+3.99%
2012	640	−1.12%
2017	677	+1.13%
2023	601	−1.97%
Source: INSEE

== Mayors ==
Date	Mayor	Date	Mayor	Date	Mayor	Date	Mayor	Date	Mayor	Date	Mayor	Date	Mayor
1794	Louis Giacobi	1811	Antoine-François Castelli	1823	Joseph Castelli	1852	Alexandre Giletta	1878	Adolphe Castellan	1919	François Pavy	2008	Paul Burro
1794	Louis Ravetto	1813	Joseph Castelli	1825	Jean-Baptiste Laurenti	1855	Anacleto Ruffi	1881	Jean-André Richéris	1932	Félix Robini		
1795	Louis Prosa	1814	Jean-André Guigoni	1829	Charles Giacobi	1856	Jean-André Richéris	1887	Adolphe Castellan	1944	Joseph Giuge		
1795	Louis Guigo	1815	Pierre-Louis Castelli	1831	François Galchier	1860	Jean-André Richéris	1888	Eugène Castelli	1945	Denis Lambert		
1795	Louis Ravetto	1818	Jean-André Laurenti	1833	André Baldoni	1861	François Baldoni	1892	Gaspart Laurenti	1947	Joseph Baldoni		
An VIII	Paul-François Laurenti	1819	Louis Giacobi	1835	Antoine Cristini	1862	Victor Franco	1894	Benjamin Franco	1960	Arthur Guigonis		
1807	Louis Giacobi	1820	Antoine-François Cristini	1837	François Baldoni	1871	Jean-André Richéris	1896	Eugène Castelli	1965	Romain Maurel		
1810	Gilette	1821	Charles Giacobi	1846	Franck Andrea	1871	Jean-André Richéris	1912	Constant Castellan	2001	Pierre Rainard		

== See also ==
- French Wikipedia page for Belvédère
- Communes of the Alpes-Maritimes department
