= Musée des Merveilles =

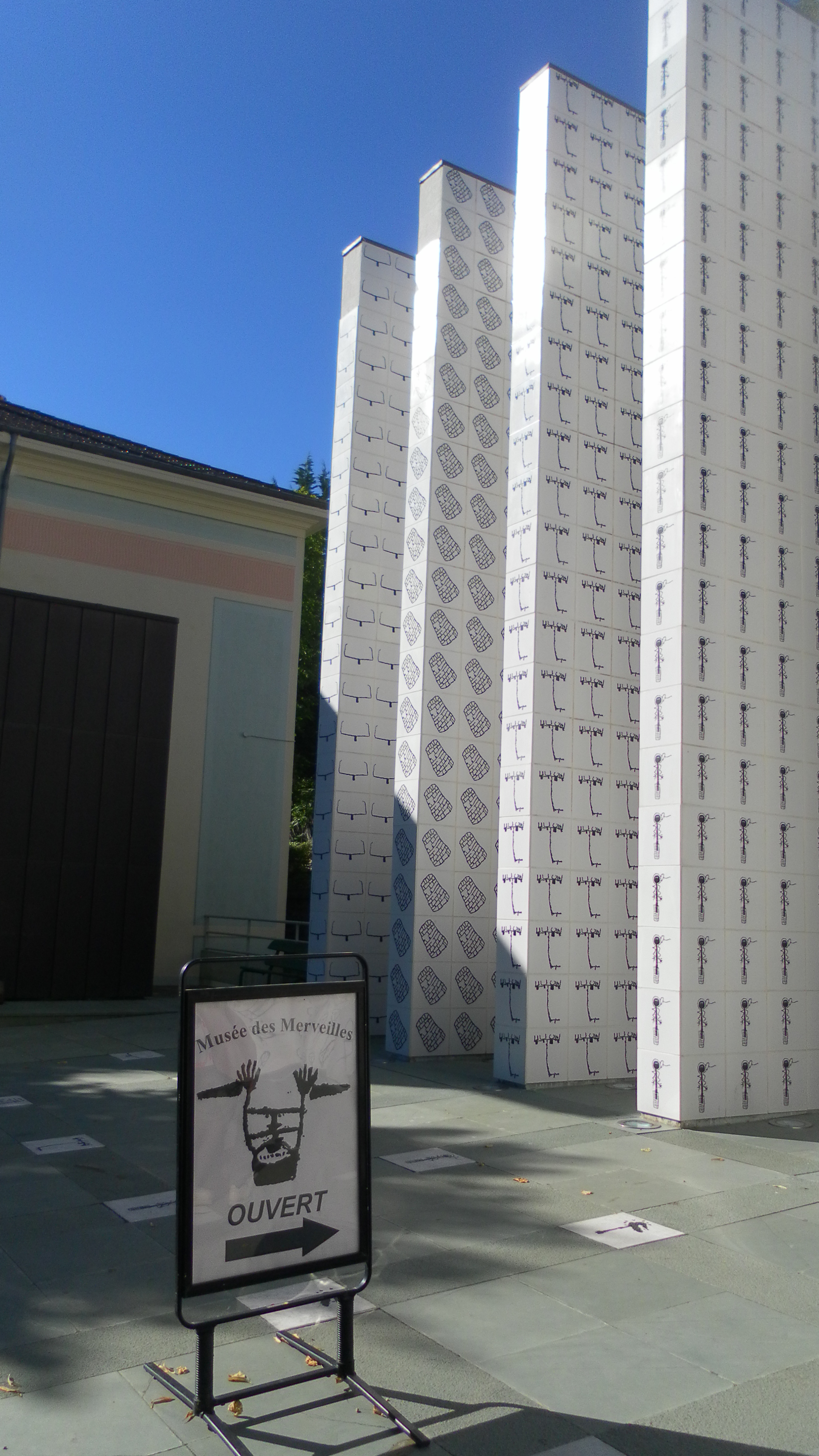
- Location: France
- Coordinates: 44°05′25″N 7°35′33″E
- Visitors: 25,529 (2019)
- Website: museedesmerveilles.departement06.fr/musee-des-merveilles-13336.html
- Location of Musée des Merveilles

Musée des Merveilles in Tende, France is a museum that documents stone age and other historic artefacts from the Mercantour National Park. It opened in 1996. There is notably a large collection of real and reproduced petroglyphs from the surroundings of the nearby Bégo Mountain.

The museum's name comes from the nearby Vallée des Merveilles.

== History ==
Located in the Mont Bego region on the Franco-Italian border, the rock engravings mainly cover two major sites: the Vallée des Merveilles and the Vallée de Fontanalbe.

Surveyed for millennia, the first mention of the Vallée des Merveilles is due to Pierre de Montfort in 1460. It is not mentioned in the literature until the sixteenth century but will not arouse the interest of researchers until the end of the 1800s. From 1879, the Englishman Clarence Bicknell developed a passion for this site and devoted thirty years of his life to it. Between the two wars, the engravings were studied by the Italians Piero Barocelli and Carlo Conti, who recorded thirty-five thousand engravings between 1927 and 1942.

But it was from 1967, that researchers from the Musée de l'Homme, the anthology laboratory and the Lazaret departmental laboratory in Nice, with the collaboration of many researchers, began a more systematic campaign of field surveys.
