= Vallée des merveilles =

Coordinates: 44°4′34″N 7°26′18″E

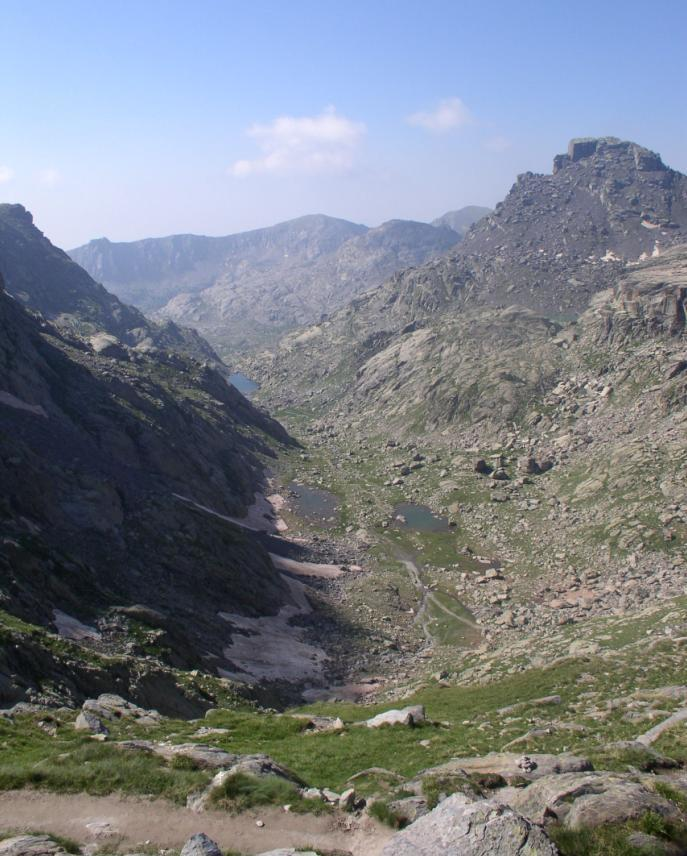
Landscape of the Vallée des Merveilles seen from the Baisse de Valmasque

The Vallée des Merveilles, also known in Italian as the Valle delle Meraviglie (English: Valley of Marvels), is a part of the Mercantour National Park in southern France. It holds the largest quantity of open-air Bronze Age petroglyphs in Europe, after Val Camonica in Italy, and is given special note for the area's inclusion for the European Diploma of Protected Areas.

== Location ==
The valley is located near the Italian border, in the rugged mountains of the Argentera massif within the Maritime Alps, between Saint-Martin-Vésubie and Tende.

== Petroglyphs ==
The petroglyphs (rock engravings), located on stone outcrops within the valley, were first identified by British amateur archaeologist Clarence Bicknell in 1881. Between 1897 and 1902, Bicknell copied and catalogued more than 10,000 drawings.

Beginning in 1967, an extensive study of the petroglyphs was begun by French archaeologist Henry de Lumley. De Lumley and a team of his postgraduate students classified the petroglyphs in the 40 km^{2} area, with the greatest concentration in a 14 km^{2} archaeological site on the slope of Mount Bégo. the engravings display objects like daggers, axes, and scythes. Suns, stars and spirals are represented. Ovals with criss-crossed lines may represent land or the earth. Some anthropomorphic figures have been found. The most common drawings are of horned animals.

Henry de Lumley has theorized the petroglyphs are the work of a Mediterranean Bronze Age people who worshipped the bull and for whom Mount Bégo was a sacred site.

The Musée des Merveilles at Tende houses numerous castings of the petroglyphs.

Examples of Petroglyphs at Vallée des Merveilles
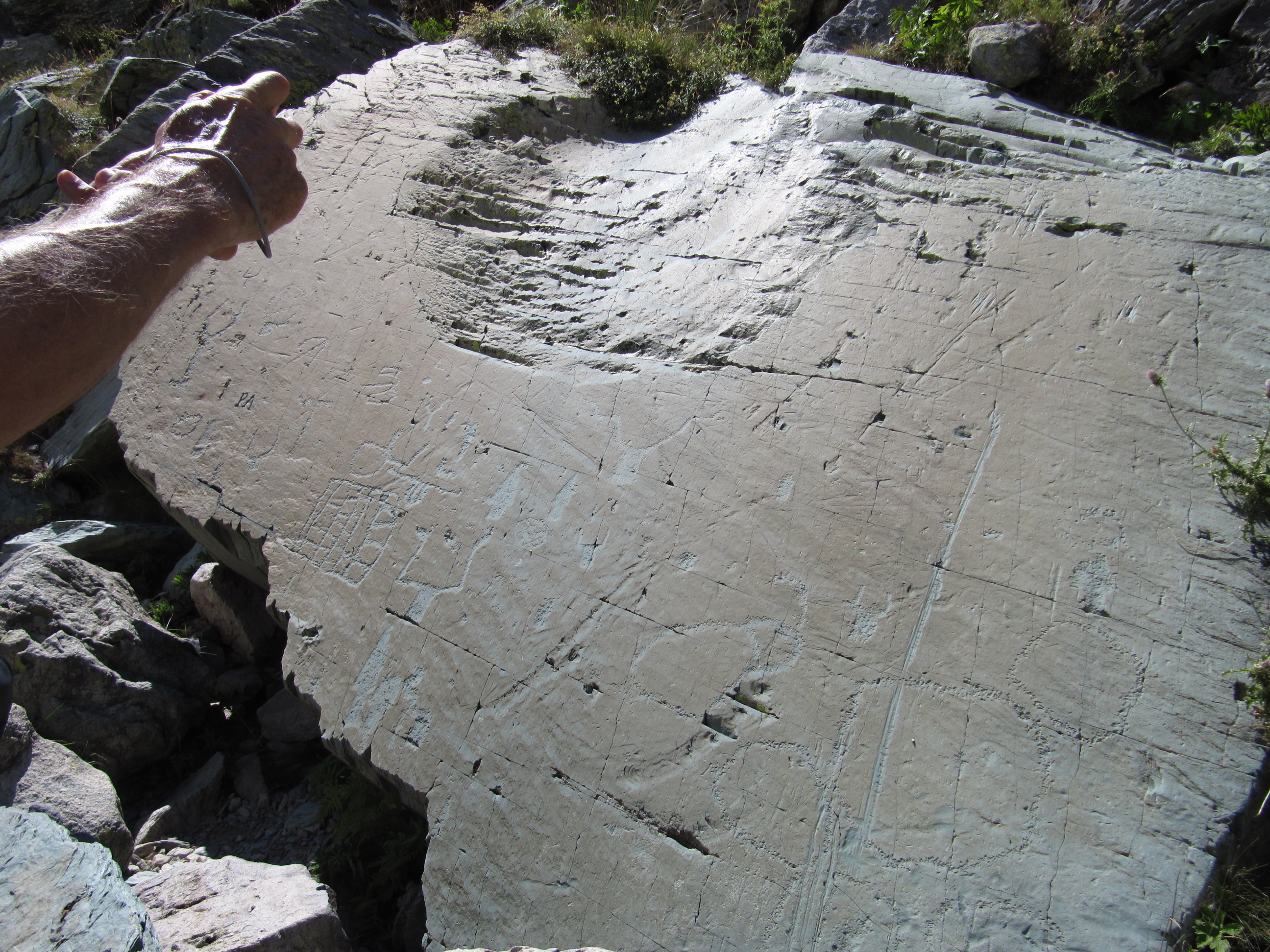
"The rock with one burst"

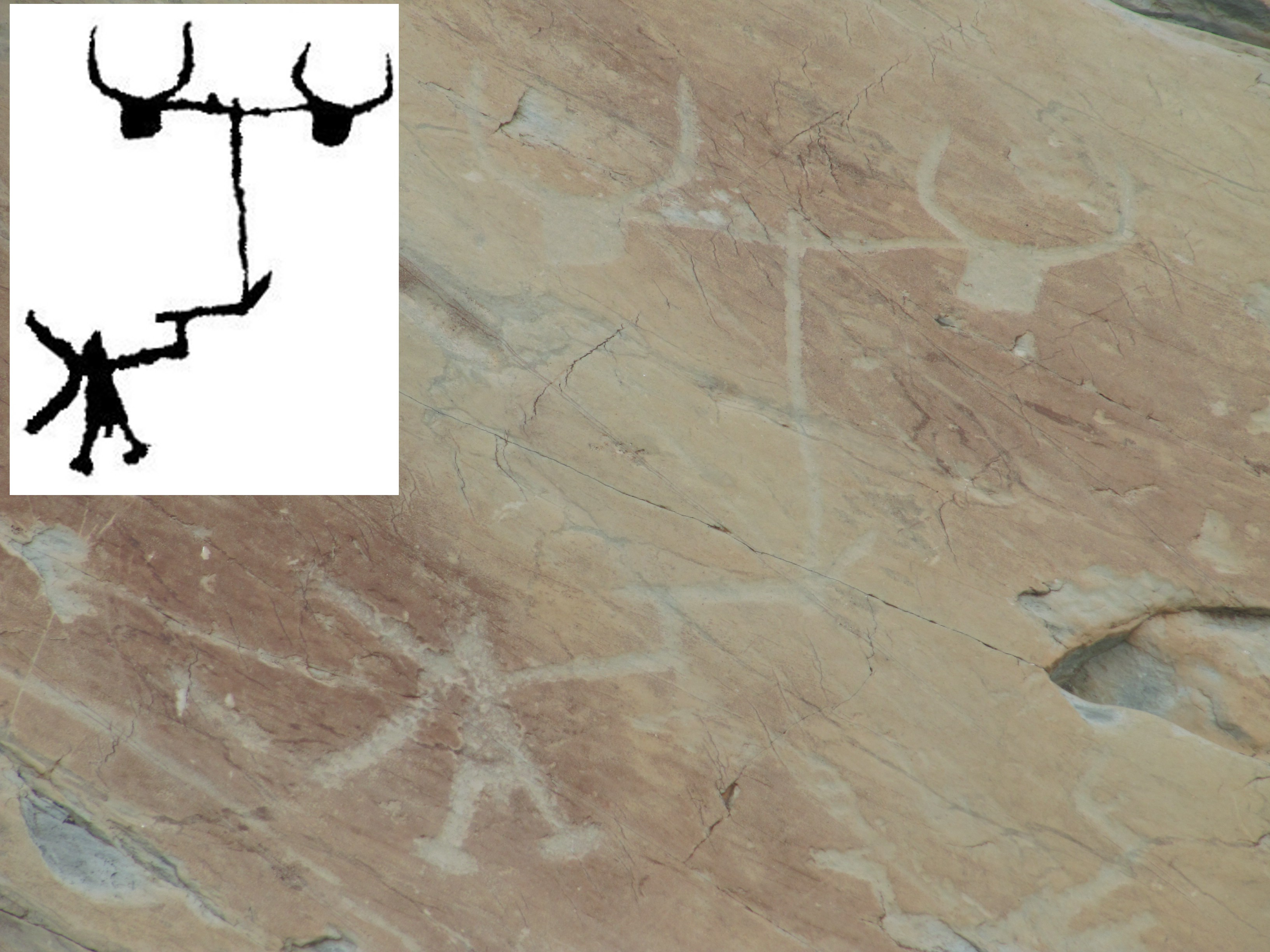
A plough, two animals and a man

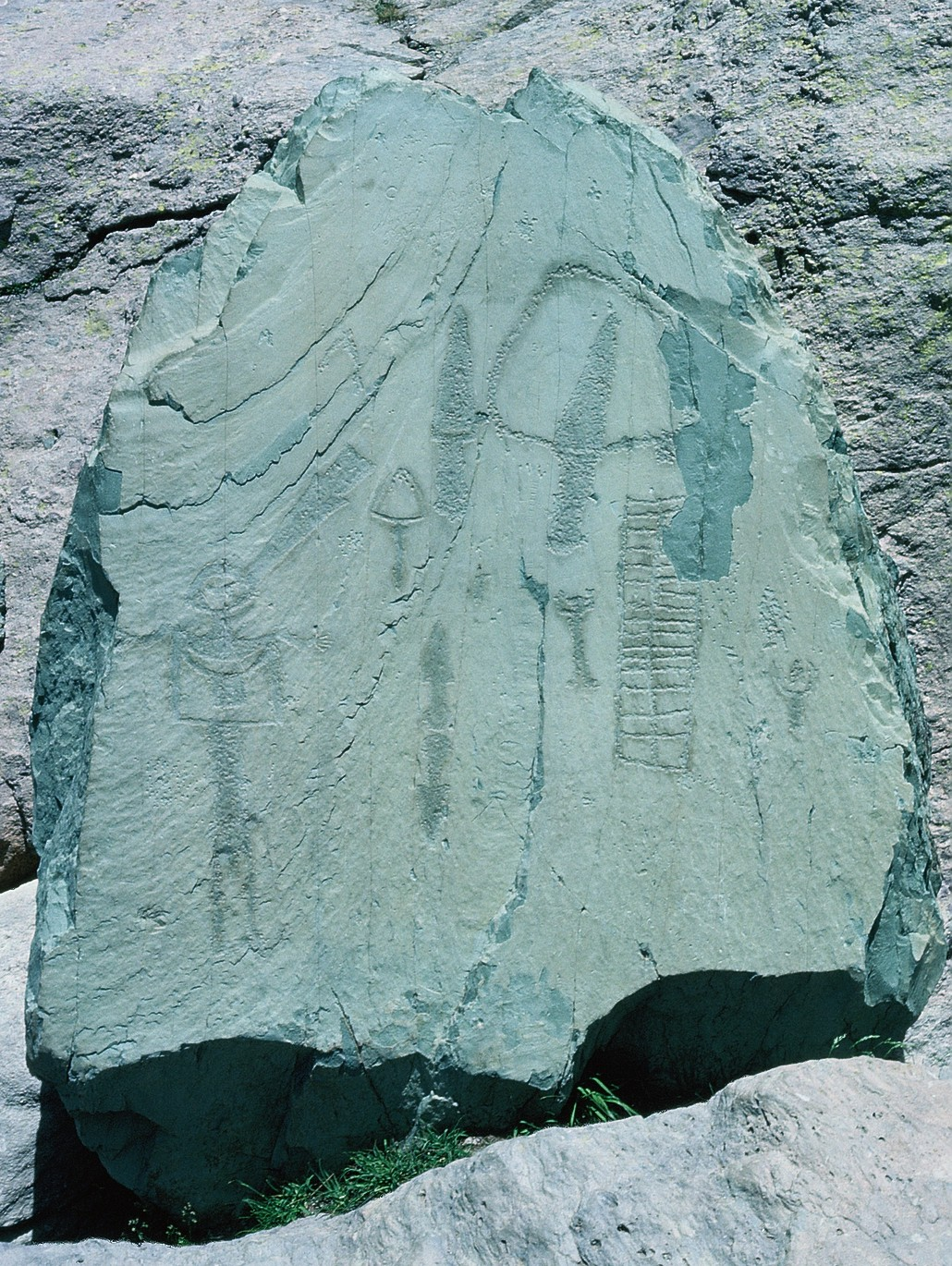
The chief of the tribe

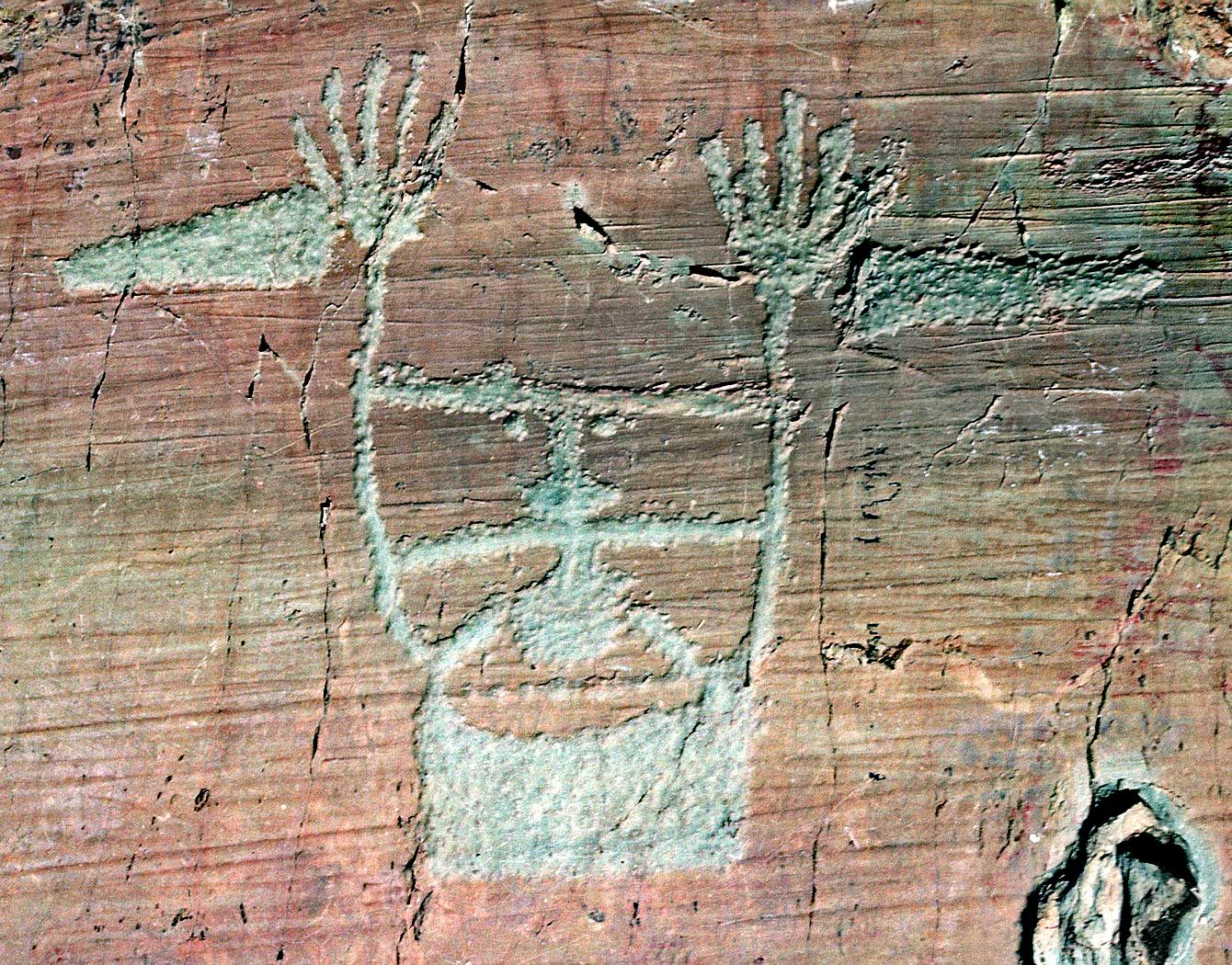
Le Sorcier

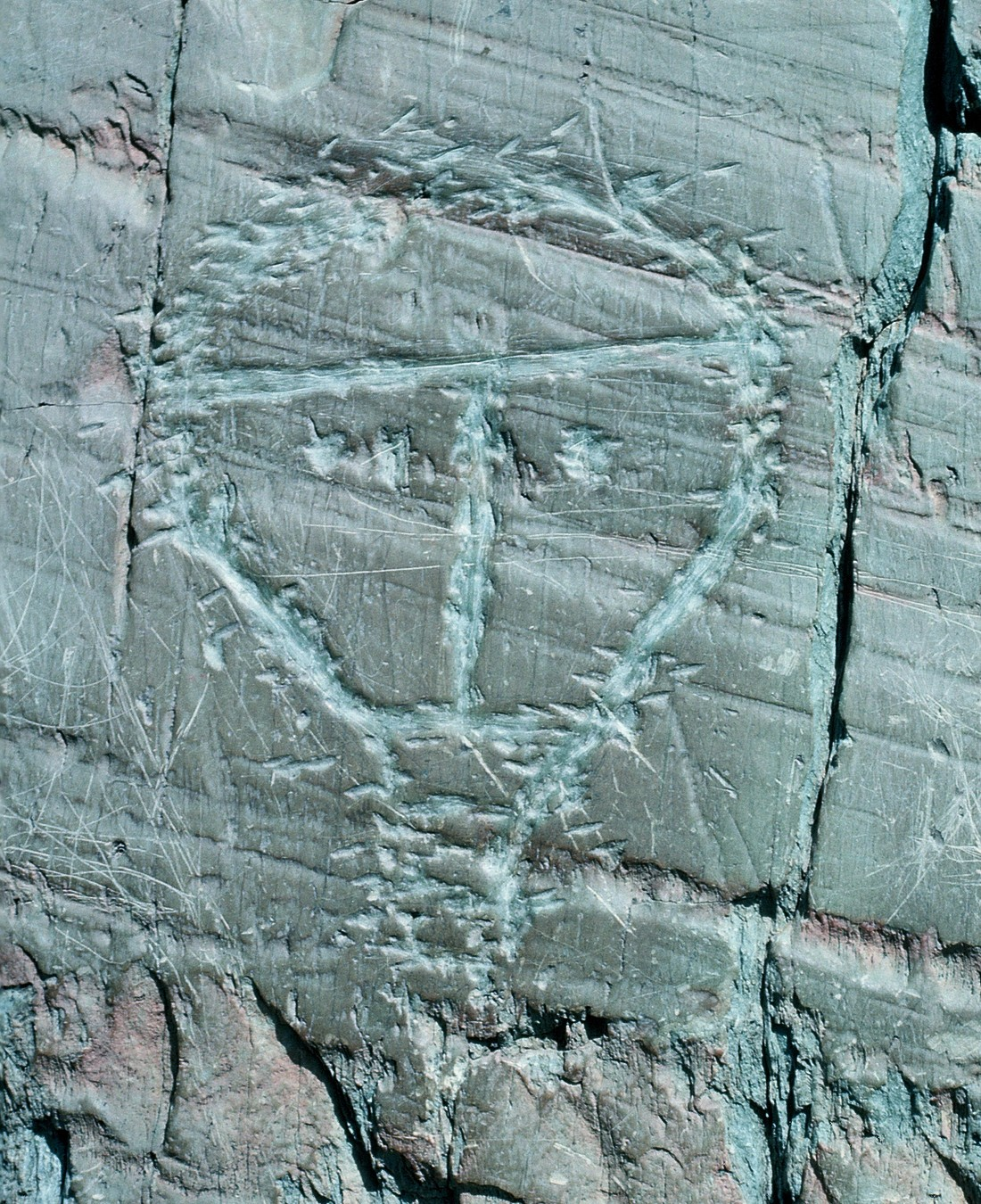
Le Christ

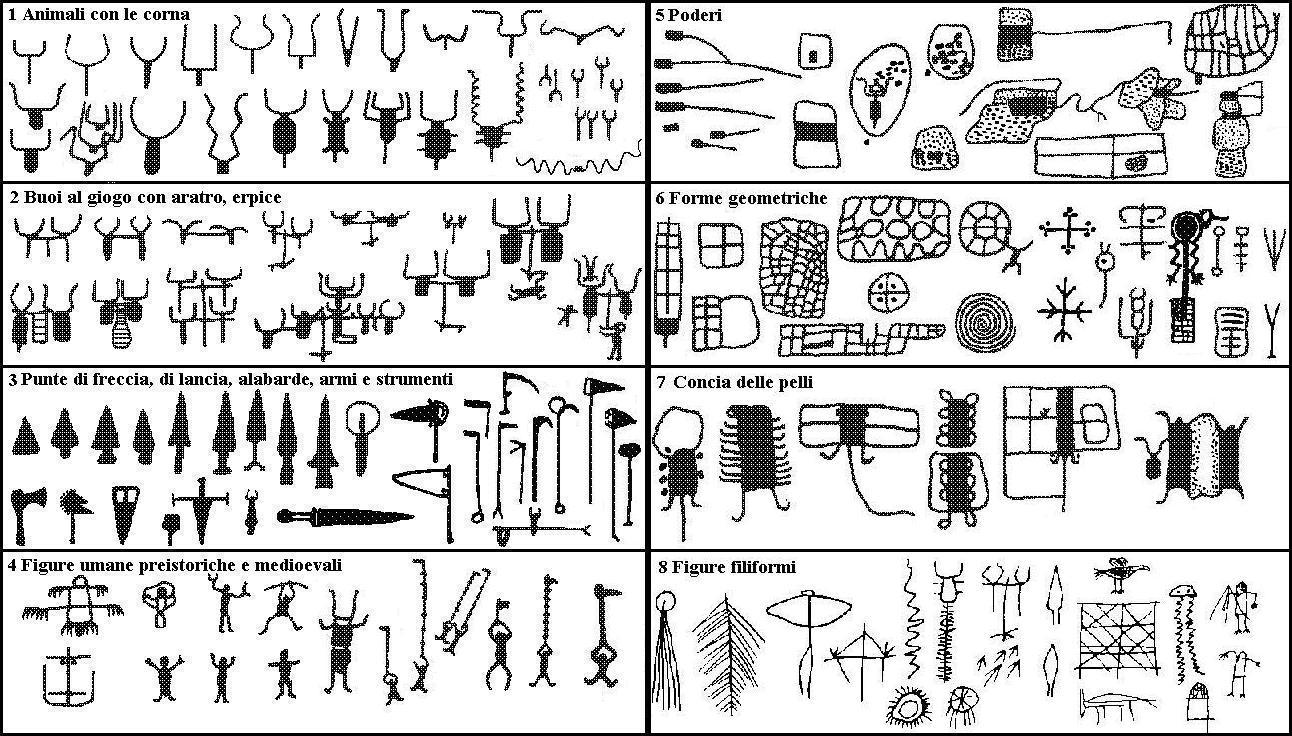
Petroglyphs
