= Gordolasque =

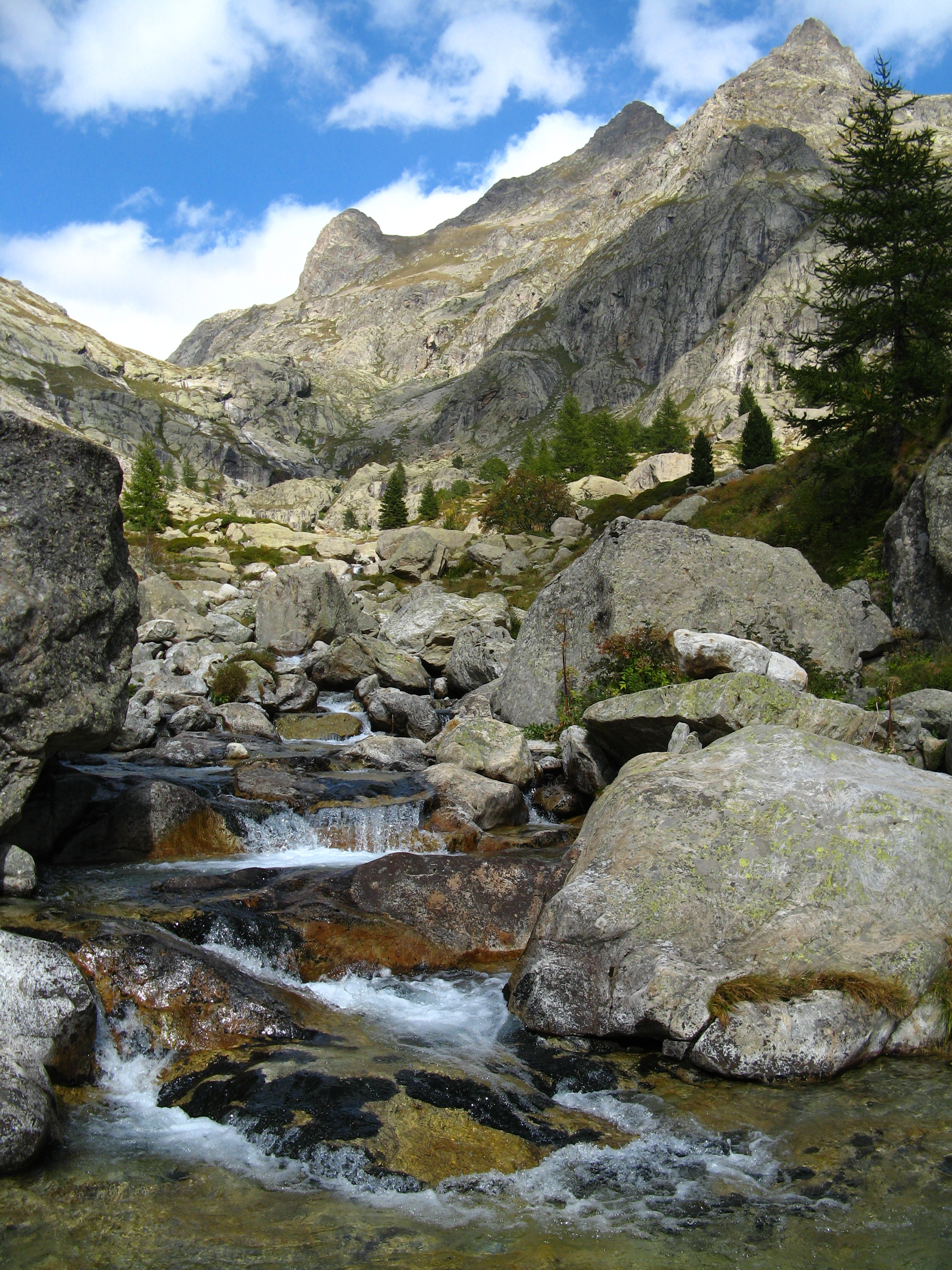

- Location within France Location within Provence-Alpes-Côte d'Azur

Location
- Country: France

Physical characteristics
- Source
  - location: Maritime Alps
- Mouth
  - location: Vésubie
  - coordinates: 44°0′5″N 7°18′36″E
- Length: 19 km (12 mi)

Basin features
- Progression: Vésubie→ Var→ Mediterranean Sea

The Gordolasque (French pronunciation: [ɡɔʁdɔlask]) is a mountain river that flows from the Mercantour National Park in the Alpes-Maritimes department of southeastern France. It is 18.8 km (11.7 mi) long. Its source is in the Maritime Alps, near the Italian border. It flows into the river Vésubie below the perched village of Belvédère.

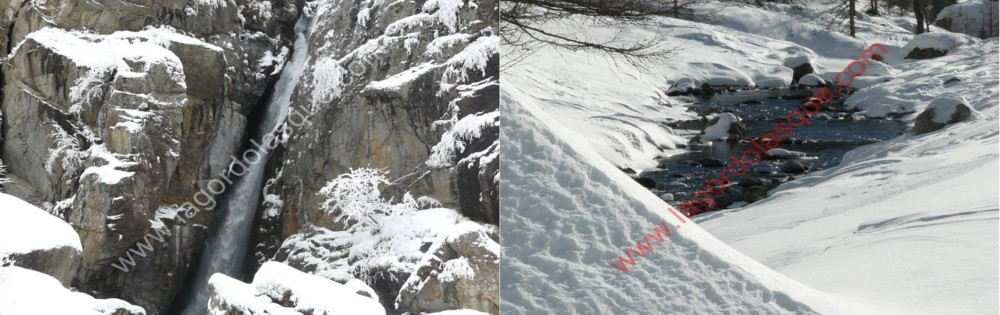
