= Tende =

Commune in Provence-Alpes-Côte d'Azur, France

- Commune
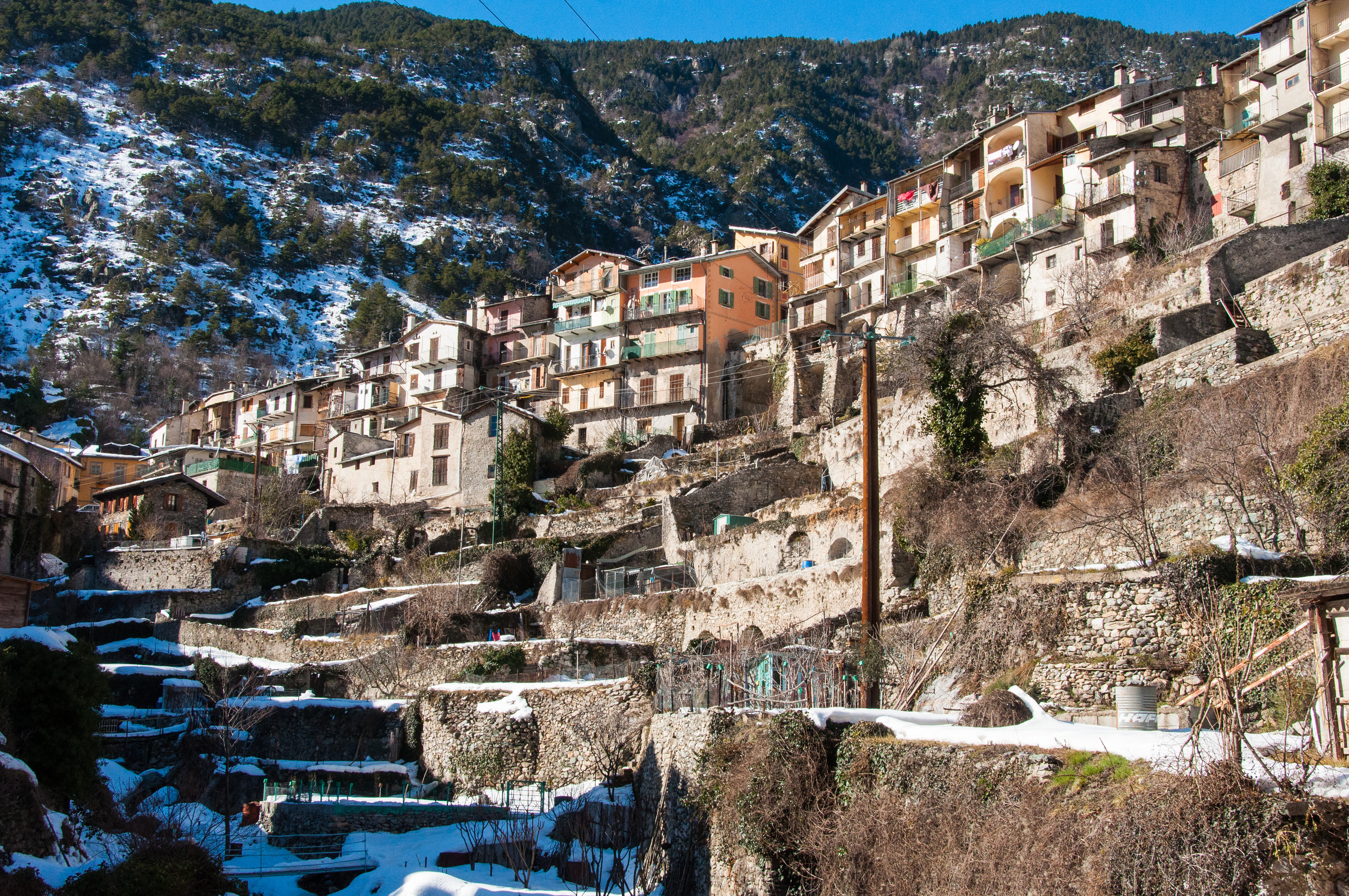

- Coat of arms
- Location of Tende
- Location within France Location within Provence-Alpes-Côte d'Azur
- Coordinates: 44°05′19″N 7°35′39″E
- Country: France
- Region: Provence-Alpes-Côte d'Azur
- Department: Alpes-Maritimes
- Arrondissement: Nice
- Canton: Contes
- Intercommunality: CA Riviera Française

Government
  - Mayor (2026–32): Sylvie Calvin-Moreau
- Area^{1}: 177.47 km^{2} (68.52 sq mi)
- Elevation: 815 m (2,674 ft)
- Highest elevation: 2,920 m (9,580 ft)
- Lowest elevation: 552 m (1,811 ft)
- Population (2023): 1,775
  - Density: 10.00/km^{2} (25.90/sq mi)
- Time zone: UTC+01:00 (CET)
  - Summer (DST): UTC+02:00 (CEST)
- INSEE/Postal code: 06163 /06430
- ^{1} French Land Register data, which excludes lakes, ponds, glaciers > 1 km^{2} (0.386 sq mi or 247 acres) and river estuaries.

Tende (French pronunciation: [tɑ̃d]; Italian, Occitan and Royasc: Tenda) is a commune in the Alpes-Maritimes department in southeastern France.

== Geography ==
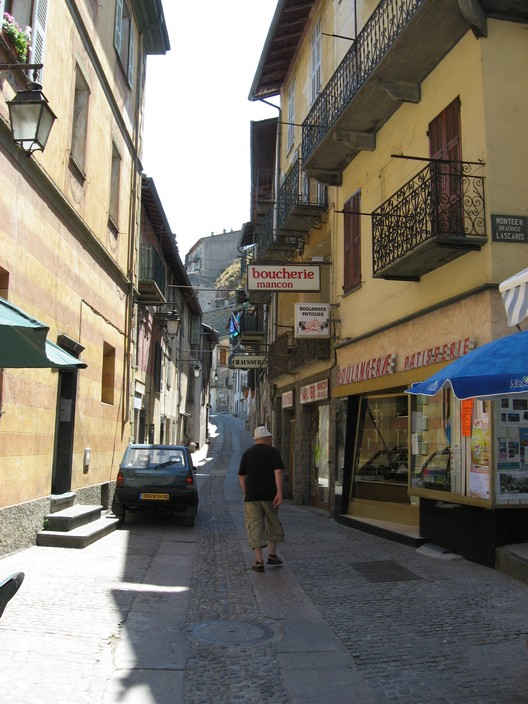
In the town

Tende is located within Mercantour National Park in the French Alps. The mountainous commune is bordered by Italy to the north, with the boundary determined by the watershed line between the two countries. This line of mountain tops contains more than 20 summits exceeding 2,000 meters (6,600 feet).

A large rectangle of land running east–west, Tende is split from north to south by the Roya river valley. The tributary Réfréi river joins the Roya within the limits of Tende.

The Col de Tende (Tende Pass), a strategic pass through the Alps to Piedmont, has been modernized to be a road and railway tunnel.

=== Climate ===
Climate data for Tende(1981-2010), altitude: 636 m
Month	Jan	Feb	Mar	Apr	May	Jun	Jul	Aug	Sep	Oct	Nov	Dec	Year
Mean daily maximum °C (°F)	9.0 (48.2)	10.7 (51.3)	13.6 (56.5)	15.4 (59.7)	20.3 (68.5)	24.2 (75.6)	27.0 (80.6)	27.0 (80.6)	22.2 (72.0)	17.9 (64.2)	12.6 (54.7)	9.2 (48.6)	17.4 (63.4)
Daily mean °C (°F)	4.1 (39.4)	5.3 (41.5)	7.9 (46.2)	10.1 (50.2)	14.5 (58.1)	18.0 (64.4)	20.3 (68.5)	20.3 (68.5)	16.3 (61.3)	12.5 (54.5)	7.8 (46.0)	4.8 (40.6)	11.8 (53.3)
Mean daily minimum °C (°F)	−0.7 (30.7)	−0.2 (31.6)	2.2 (36.0)	4.8 (40.6)	8.7 (47.7)	11.7 (53.1)	13.7 (56.7)	13.6 (56.5)	10.3 (50.5)	7.2 (45.0)	3.0 (37.4)	0.4 (32.7)	6.2 (43.2)
Average precipitation mm (inches)	83.3 (3.28)	45.5 (1.79)	46.0 (1.81)	98.5 (3.88)	72.8 (2.87)	65.6 (2.58)	47.5 (1.87)	58.5 (2.30)	105.3 (4.15)	144.9 (5.70)	147.7 (5.81)	99.2 (3.91)	1,014.8 (39.95)
Average precipitation days (≥ 1 mm)	5.5	3.3	4.5	9.4	9.4	7	6.1	5.9	6.4	8.1	7.6	5.9	79.1
Source: Infoclimat

== History ==
Known to be a populated place in 690, it is unclear when Tende first became an organized settlement. Prehistoric rock engravings have been found in the area, which are now on display in the Musée des Merveilles or in situ.

Tende is a medieval village of tumultuous history, having belonged successively to the Count of Ventimiglia in the tenth century, then the Counts of Provence and the Counts of Lascaris of Ventimiglia before being swapped several times between Italy and France. First to the Savoyard state, then the French First Republic (later the Napoleonic Empire), then restored to the Savoyard Kingdom of Sardinia-Piedmont (which became in 1861 the Kingdom of Italy).

From 1861 to 1947 Tende was part of Italy, and was damaged during the Italian invasion of France in 1940. Tende was the last commune to join the French Republic in 1947, which was endorsed by a controversial local referendum, when Italy was forced to cede (after defeat in World War II) some alpine areas to France.

The hillside village is overlooked by the spire-like remnants of the main turret of the castle of the Lascaris, which was built in the 14th century as protection from the attacking Count of Provence, Charles d'Anjou. The castle was destroyed in 1692 when King Louis XIV ordered his Marshal, Catinat, to destroy all fortified structures in France that might challenge his rule. The only complete structure that remains is a circular tower, transformed into a clock during the 19th century. The tolling of the clock's bells can be heard day and night throughout Tende.

Tende is located on what was once an important route of the salt trade between Italy and France. During their reign of Tende, the Lascaris would demand a toll of those transporting salt and others passing through the region.

== Population ==
Historical population

Year	Pop.	±% p.a.
1793	1,500	—
1800	1,491	−0.09%
1806	1,654	+1.74%
1822	2,057	+1.37%
1838	2,441	+1.08%
1848	2,659	+0.86%
1946	2,158	−0.21%
1954	2,080	−0.46%
1962	1,954	−0.78%

Year	Pop.	±% p.a.
1968	2,053	+0.83%
1975	1,951	−0.73%
1982	1,954	+0.02%
1990	2,089	+0.84%
1999	1,844	−1.38%
2007	2,018	+1.13%
2012	2,153	+1.30%
2017	2,178	+0.23%
2023	1,775	−3.35%

Source: EHESS and INSEE (1968-2023)

== Culture ==
While the main language of Tende is French, most of Tende's residents also speak Tendasque (which can also refer to the villagers themselves), a variety of the Ligurian language with Provençal influences. The Tendasque dialect has many similarities with the Mentonasque of the coast.

A map of the County of Nice (in Italian) showing the area of the Savoyard state annexed in 1860 to France (light brown) and to Italy (yellow). Tende (Tenda in Italian) was in the yellow section.

Among the village's youth, Tendasque is less prevalent (about 30%), while many of them can speak Italian.

The village recently began celebrating a series of festivals during the summer, each dedicated to an aspect of local culture. One such festival celebrates the Old Tende (the medieval section), and on the second Sunday of each July, a long-standing festival is held in honor of Saint Eloi, patron saint of the village.

Sugelli, a distinctive pasta with a thumb print indentation is a local specialty.

At the base of the hillside town is a public swimming pool, built around the turn of the millennium.

A via ferrata along the tops of the village's mountains attracts climbers. The trail head can be accessed from near the base of the town clock.

== Economy ==
- Three hydroelectric power stations
- Breeding of cows and sheep
- Cheeses, honey and jams
- Old crystal mine

== Transportation ==
Tende has a railway station on the Nice/Ventimiglia-Breil-sur-Roya-Cuneo line run by the SNCF, with connecting service from Ventimiglia/Nice in the southwest to Turin to the north. Train services are mostly operated by Trenitalia. The Train des Merveilles, makes a three daily runs from Nice to Tende. Taking the 9.08am train from Nice (arriving at 11.33am) and returning on the 2.44pm train will give you three hours in the area. The train journey itself gives views of old French towns in mountain valleys.

== Twin towns – sister cities ==
Tende is twinned with:

- Narzole, Italy (1992)

== See also ==
- Col de Tende
- Communes of the Alpes-Maritimes department
