= Vésubie =

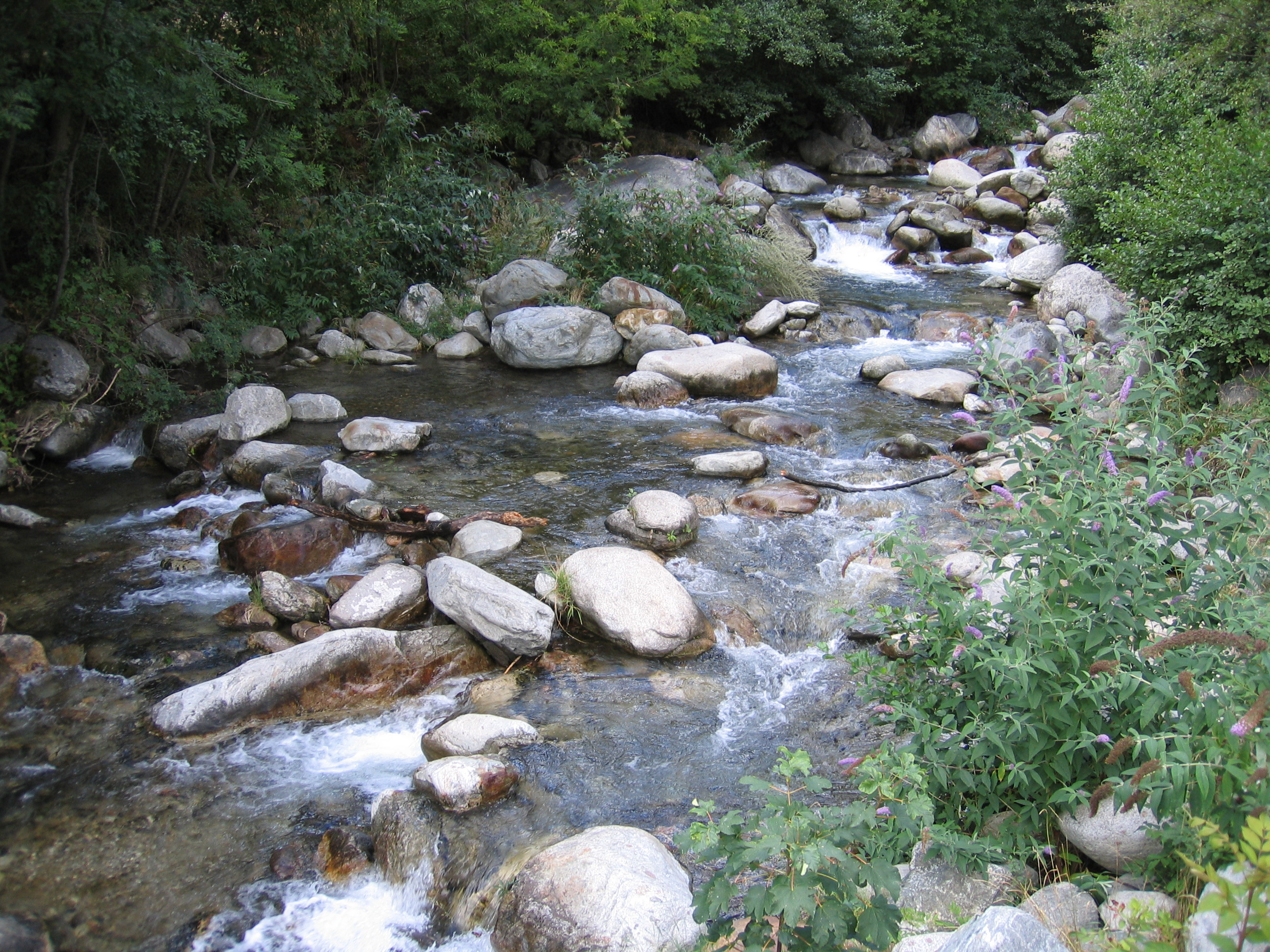
- The Vésubie in Saint-Martin-Vésubie

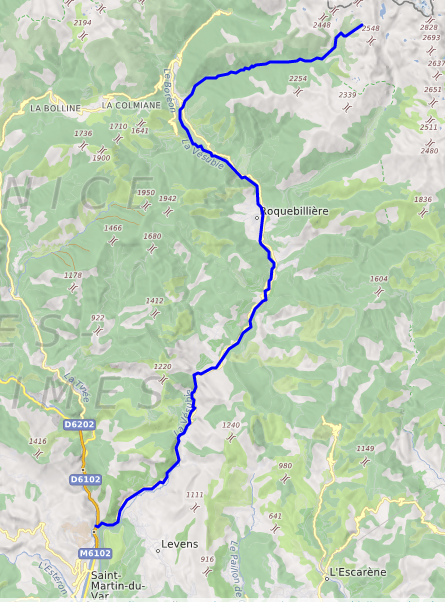

Location
- Country: France

Physical characteristics
- Mouth
  - location: Var
  - coordinates: 43°51′35″N 7°11′51″E
- Length: 46 km (29 mi)
- Basin size: 392 km^{2} (151 sq mi)

Basin features
- Progression: Var→ Mediterranean Sea

The Vésubie (French pronunciation: [vezybi]) is a river in the southeast of France. It is a left tributary of the Var in the Maritime Alps. It is 45.9 km (28.5 mi) long. Its drainage basin is 392 km^{2} (151 sq mi). The source is in the Mercantour National Park near the border with Italy. The river flows through the town of Saint-Martin-Vésubie, a major center for hiking. It flows into the Var near Levens. One of its tributaries is the Gordolasque.

== Towns along the river ==
- Saint-Martin-Vésubie
- Roquebillière
- Lantosque
- Utelle
- Duranus
- Belvédère
