= Saint-Martin-Vésubie =

Commune in Provence-Alpes-Côte d'Azur, France

- Commune
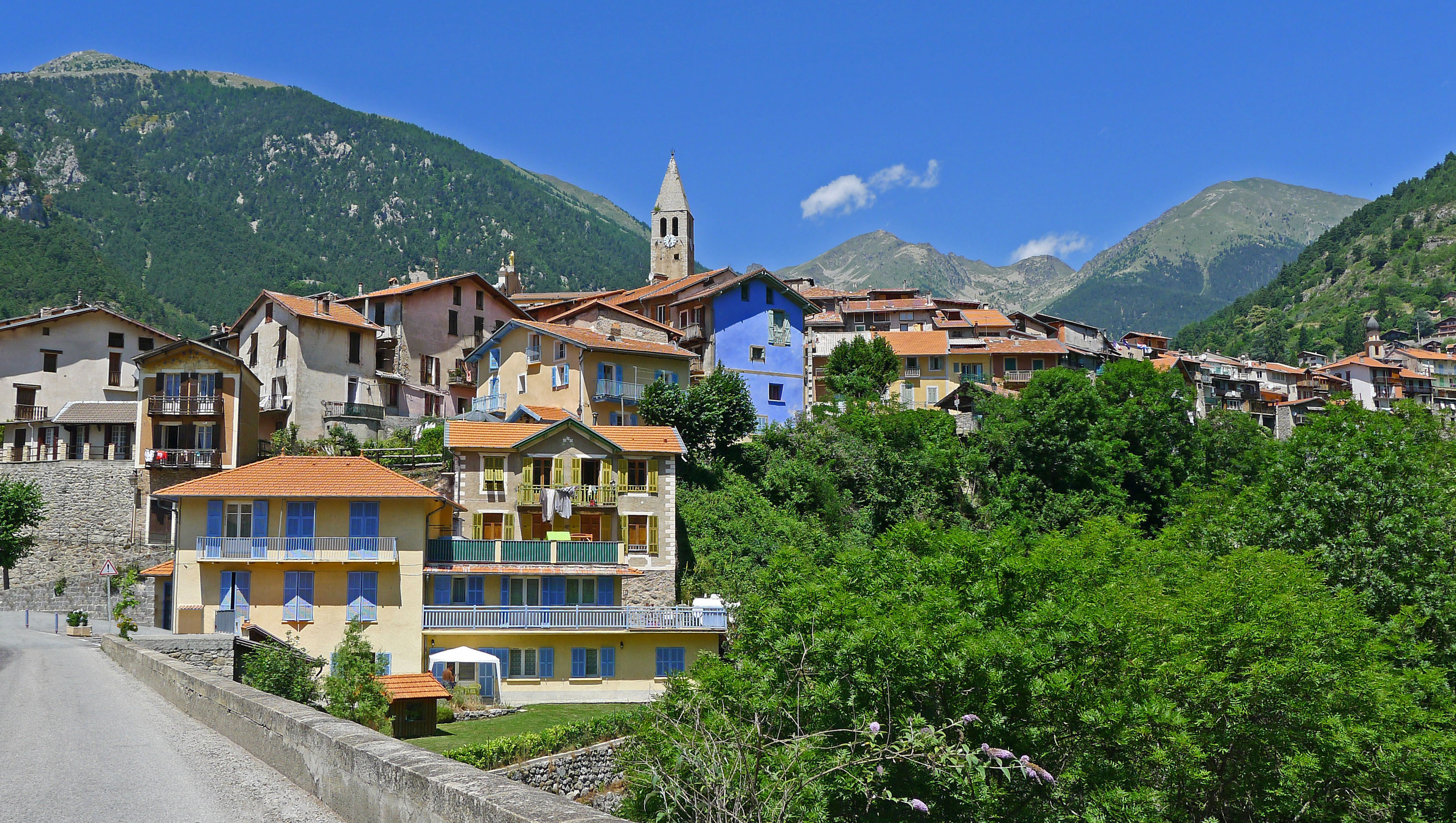
- View of Saint-Martin-Vésubie

- Coat of arms
- Location of Saint-Martin-Vésubie
- Location within France Location within Provence-Alpes-Côte d'Azur
- Coordinates: 44°04′09″N 7°15′24″E
- Country: France
- Region: Provence-Alpes-Côte d'Azur
- Department: Alpes-Maritimes
- Arrondissement: Nice
- Canton: Tourrette-Levens
- Intercommunality: Métropole Nice Côte d'Azur

Government
  - Mayor (2026–32): Jean-Christophe Teobaldi
- Area^{1}: 97.14 km^{2} (37.51 sq mi)
- Elevation: 960 m (3,150 ft)
- Highest elevation: 3,120 m (10,240 ft)
- Lowest elevation: 715 m (2,346 ft)
- Population (2023): 1,337
  - Density: 13.76/km^{2} (35.65/sq mi)
- Time zone: UTC+01:00 (CET)
  - Summer (DST): UTC+02:00 (CEST)
- INSEE/Postal code: 06127 /06450
- ^{1} French Land Register data, which excludes lakes, ponds, glaciers > 1 km^{2} (0.386 sq mi or 247 acres) and river estuaries.

Saint-Martin-Vésubie (French pronunciation: [sɛ̃ maʁtɛ̃ vezybi]; Vivaro-Alpine: Sant Martin de Lantosca; Italian: San Martino Lantosca, formerly) is a commune of the Alpes-Maritimes department, Provence-Alpes-Côte d'Azur region in Southeastern France. Established on the edge of a glacial plate, it was named after the Vésubie, a local river.

== History ==
=== Early years ===
San Martin first appears in recorded history in the 12th century, although there are archaeological remnants of a Romanized indigenous population dating back to the 1st century. The medieval castrum extends along a cliff overlooking Valley of the Madonna through which ran the old Salt Road that extended from the Piedmont to the port city of Nice.

It was part of the historic County of Nice until 1860 as San Martino Vesubia. In their 1997 book "The Templar Revelation," Lynn Picknett and Clive Prince write that Saint-Martin-de-Vésubie was the "site of a legendary massacre of Templars in 1308."

=== Recent times ===
Historical population
Year	Pop.	±% p.a.
1968	1,047	—
1975	1,188	+1.82%
1982	1,156	−0.39%
1990	1,041	−1.30%
1999	1,098	+0.59%
2007	1,329	+2.42%
2012	1,345	+0.24%
2017	1,411	+0.96%
2023	1,337	−0.89%
Source: INSEE

In World War II, Alpes-Maritimes was occupied by the Italian Fourth Army from 11 November 1942 onwards. The sympathy of the Italian authorities caused the area to become a safe haven for thousands of Jewish refugees. Jews were able to achieve a modicum of safety and legal residency under the Italian authorities, who relocated them to Saint-Martin-Vésubie. The sympathy of the Italian authorities was mainly due to the work of the Italian Jewish banker Angelo Donati, who was living in Nice and convinced them to protect the Jews from French and German persecution.

After the Italian Armistice in September 1943, and under direct threat from the German authorities, a thousand of Saint-Martin's Jews made the climb up the Old Salt Road mountain passes in the Gesso Valley and what they thought was the safety of Italy. Almost all the remaining Jews in Saint-Martin were arrested and transported to Auschwitz. Monuments in Saint-Martin's war-memorial plaza commemorate the village's role in sheltering Jewish refugees and list the names of the 31 Jews who were arrested in the village and the 230 Jews who were then later arrested in Italy and deported to Auschwitz. The annual Marche de la Mémoire is held in September to commemorate the flight of the Jews from Saint-Martin to Italy.

The local gendarmerie commander, Maréchal des logis-chef Landry Mangon and his wife Adrienne took under protection a one year old Jewish child named Jean-Claude Dreymann and another officer Joseph Fougere and his wife Yvonne took the child's five-year-old sister Cecile and presented them as their children during the Gestapo's round-up of Jews and thereby saved their lives. For this noble act and the risks they took on their lives and their families to save Jews, the families of the officers were recognised as Righteous among the Nations at a ceremony that was conducted at the town hall on 5 September 2010.

The village was severely damaged by Storm Alex in October 2020.

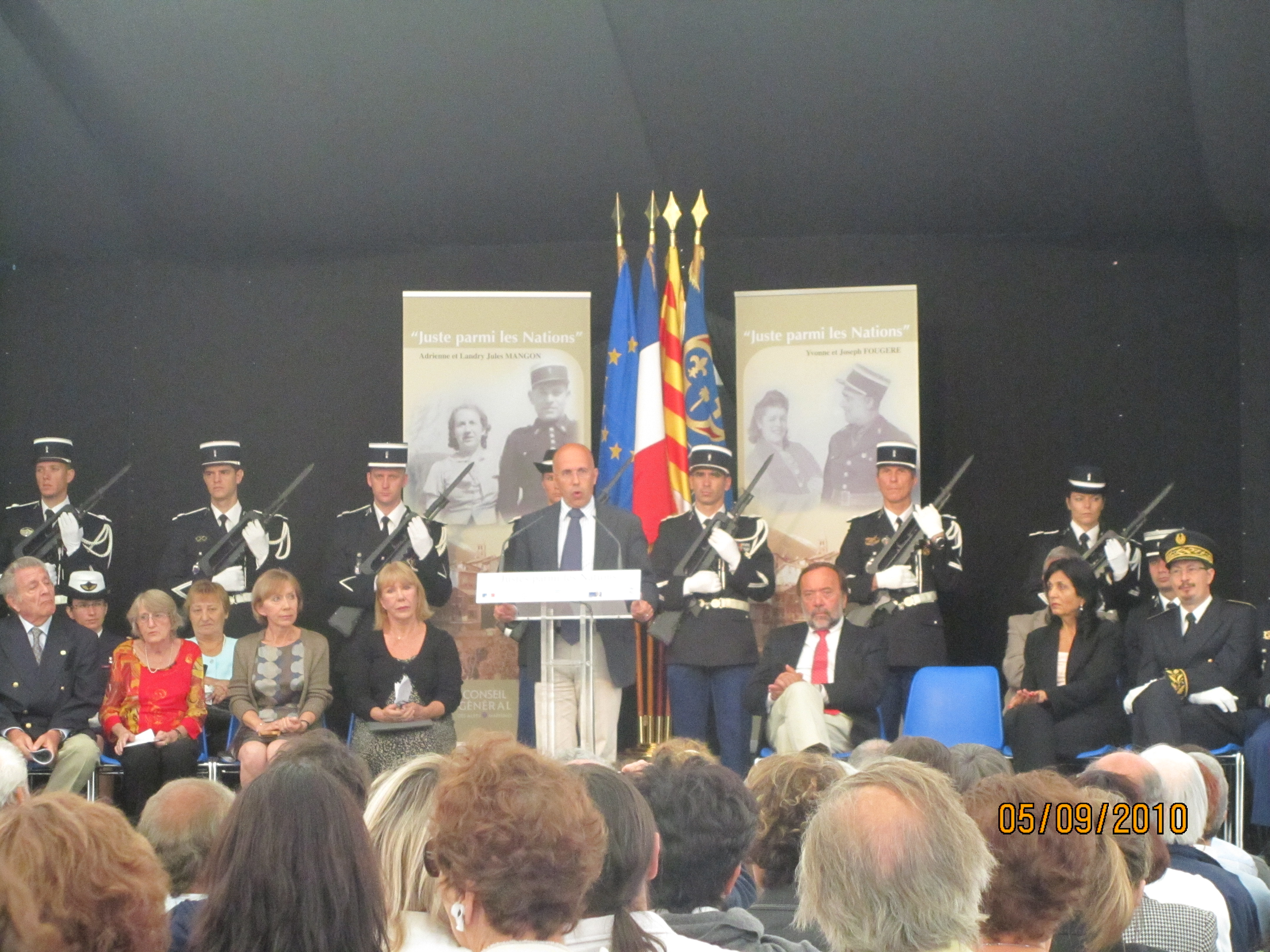
Jean-Claude Dreymann sitting first on the left with his sister Cecile next to him

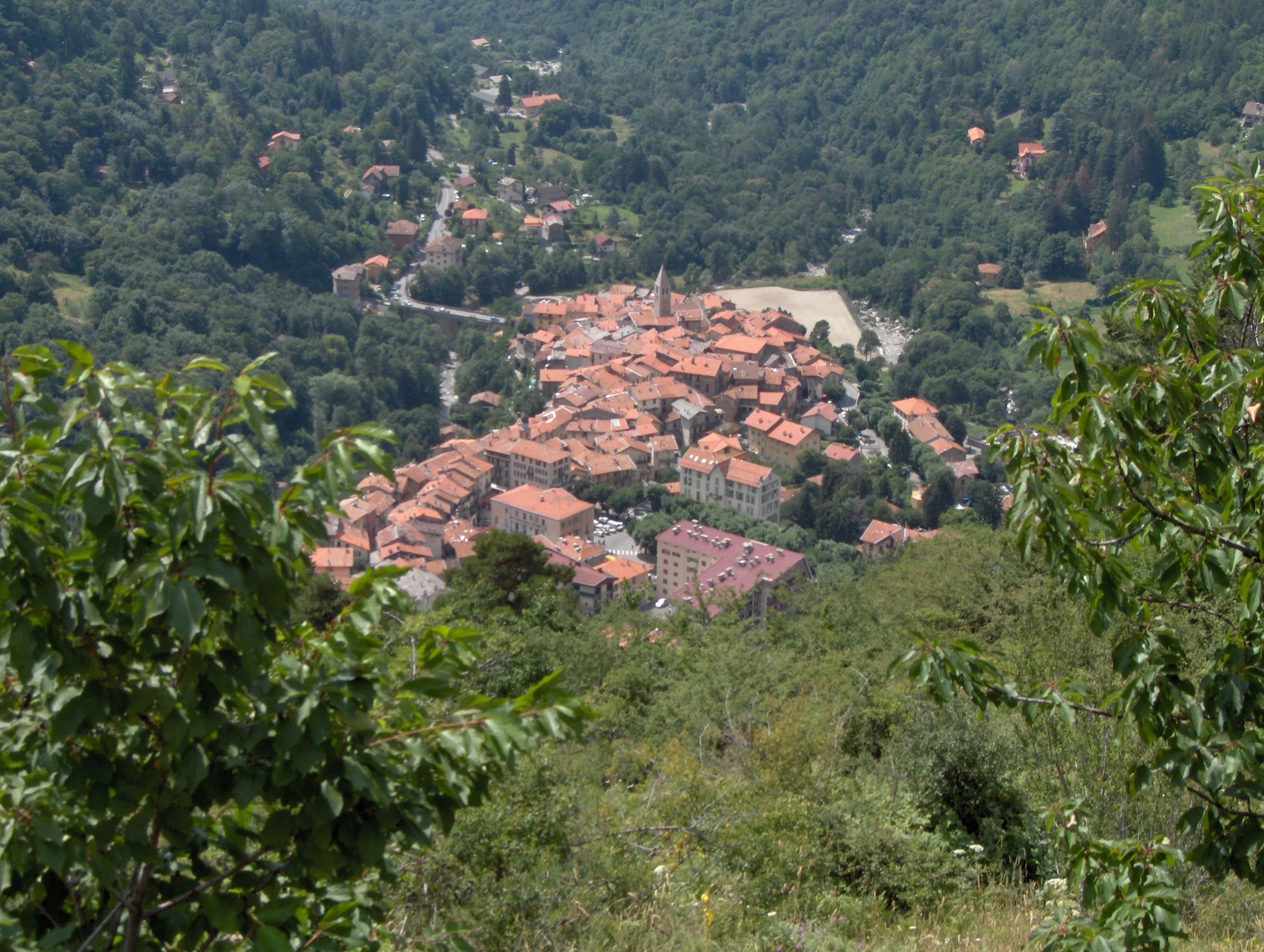
A view of Saint-Martin-Vésubie from the nearby hillside

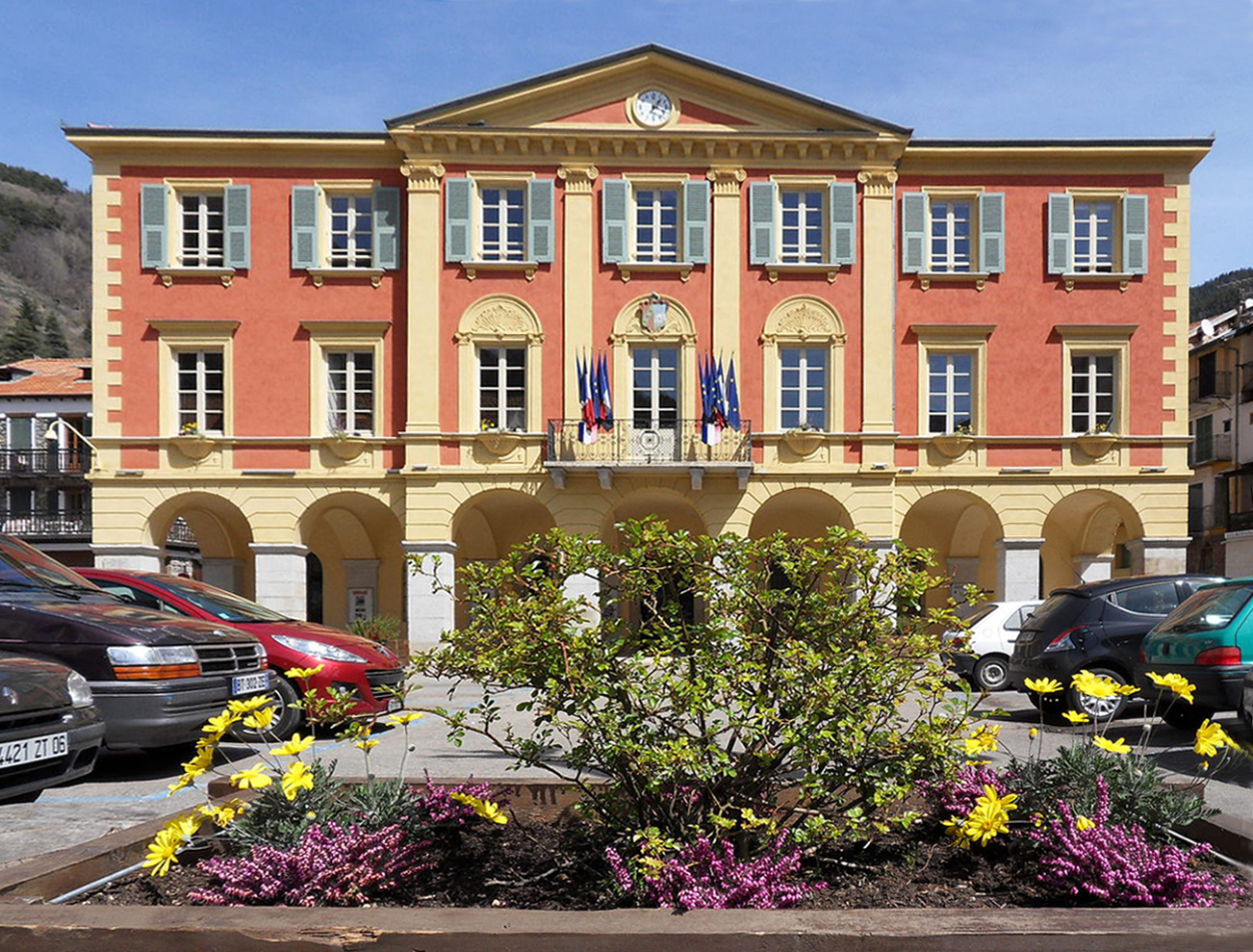
Town hall

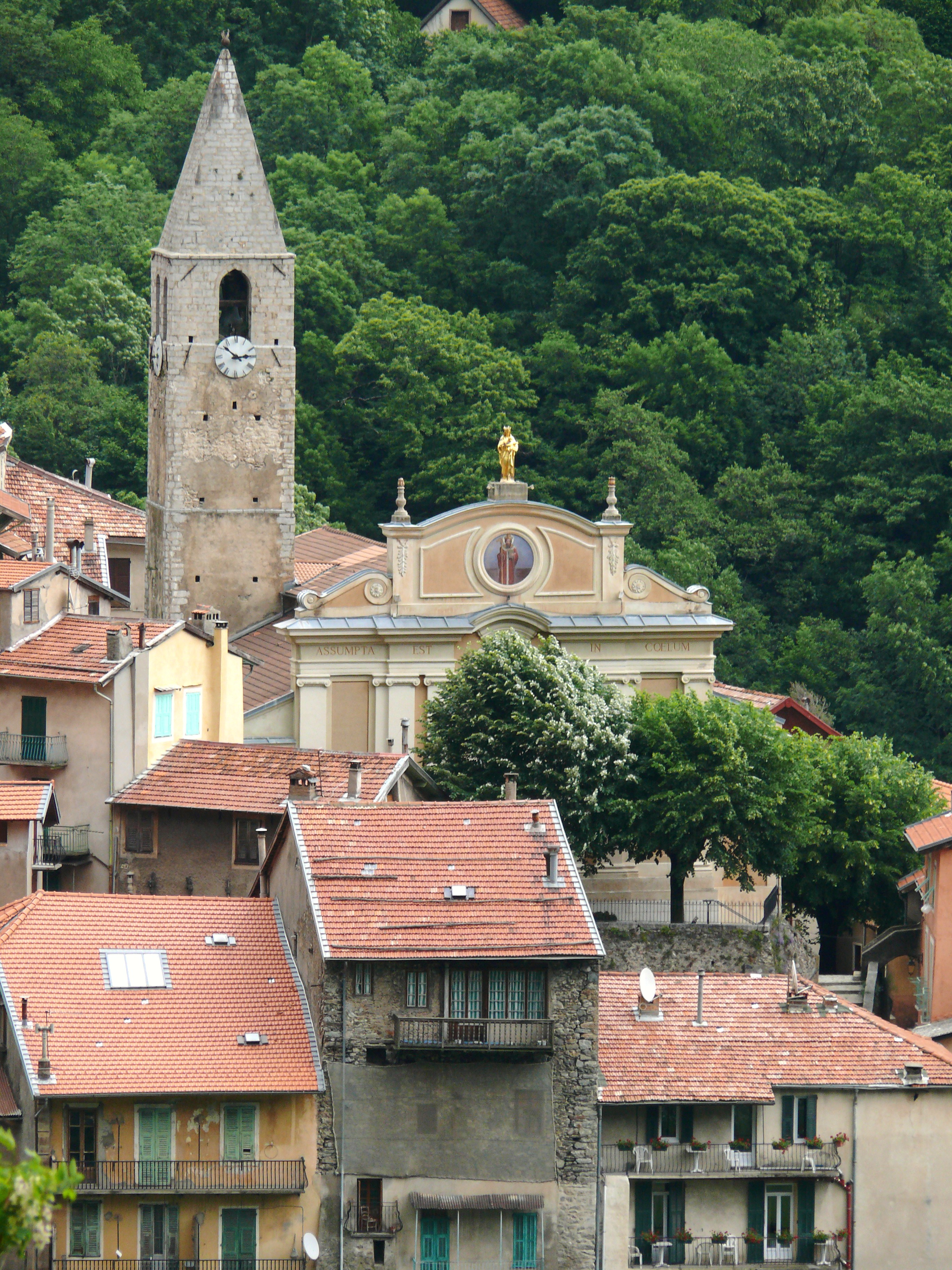
Église Notre-Dame-de-l'Assomption

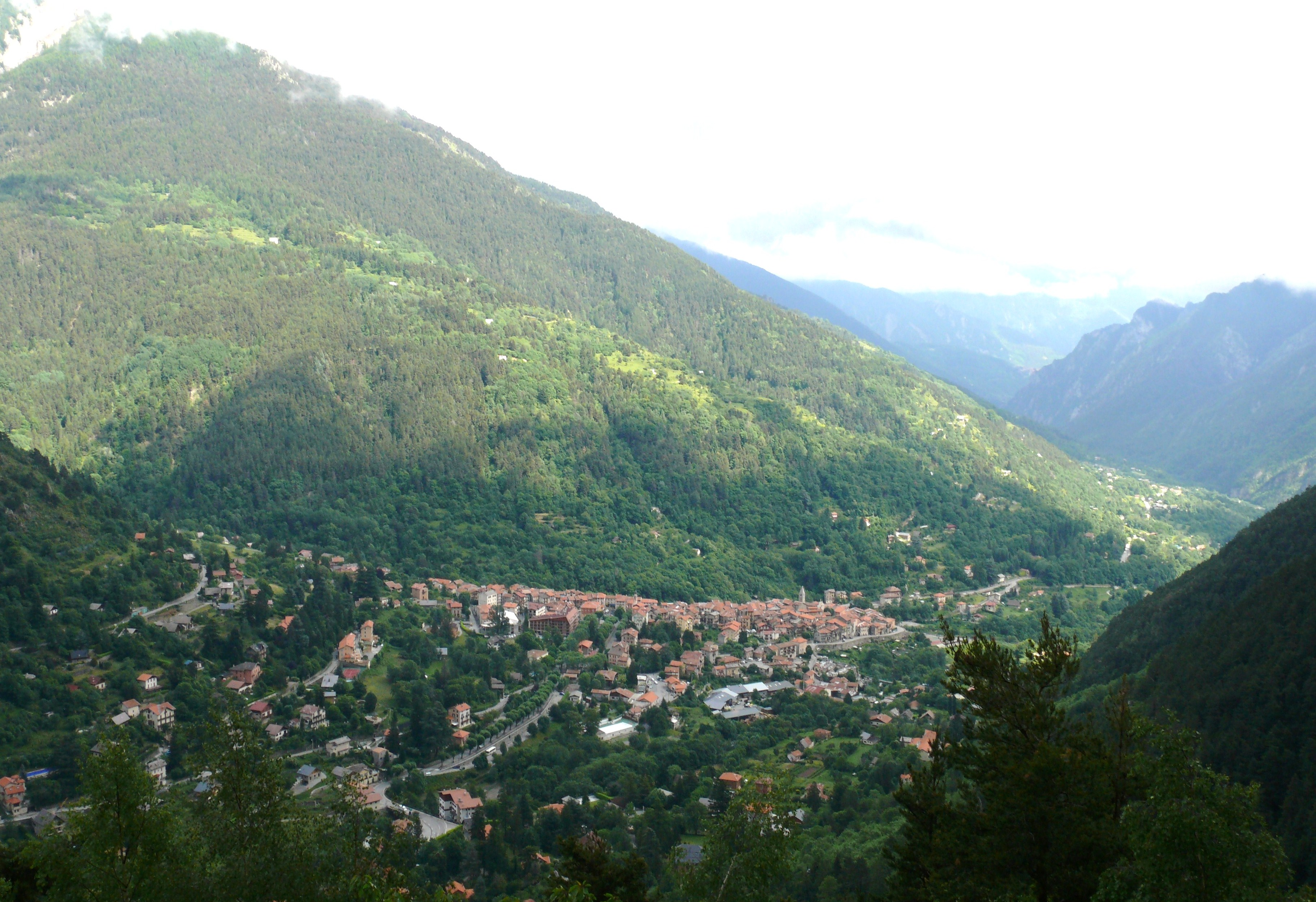
General view

== Media ==
Saint-Martin features in the first scenes of Wandering Star, the novel by J. M. G. Le Clézio.

It was included in the 2014 racing video game Forza Horizon 2 under the name Saint-Martin.

== See also ==
- Communes of the Alpes-Maritimes department
