= Mont Bégo =

Mountain in France

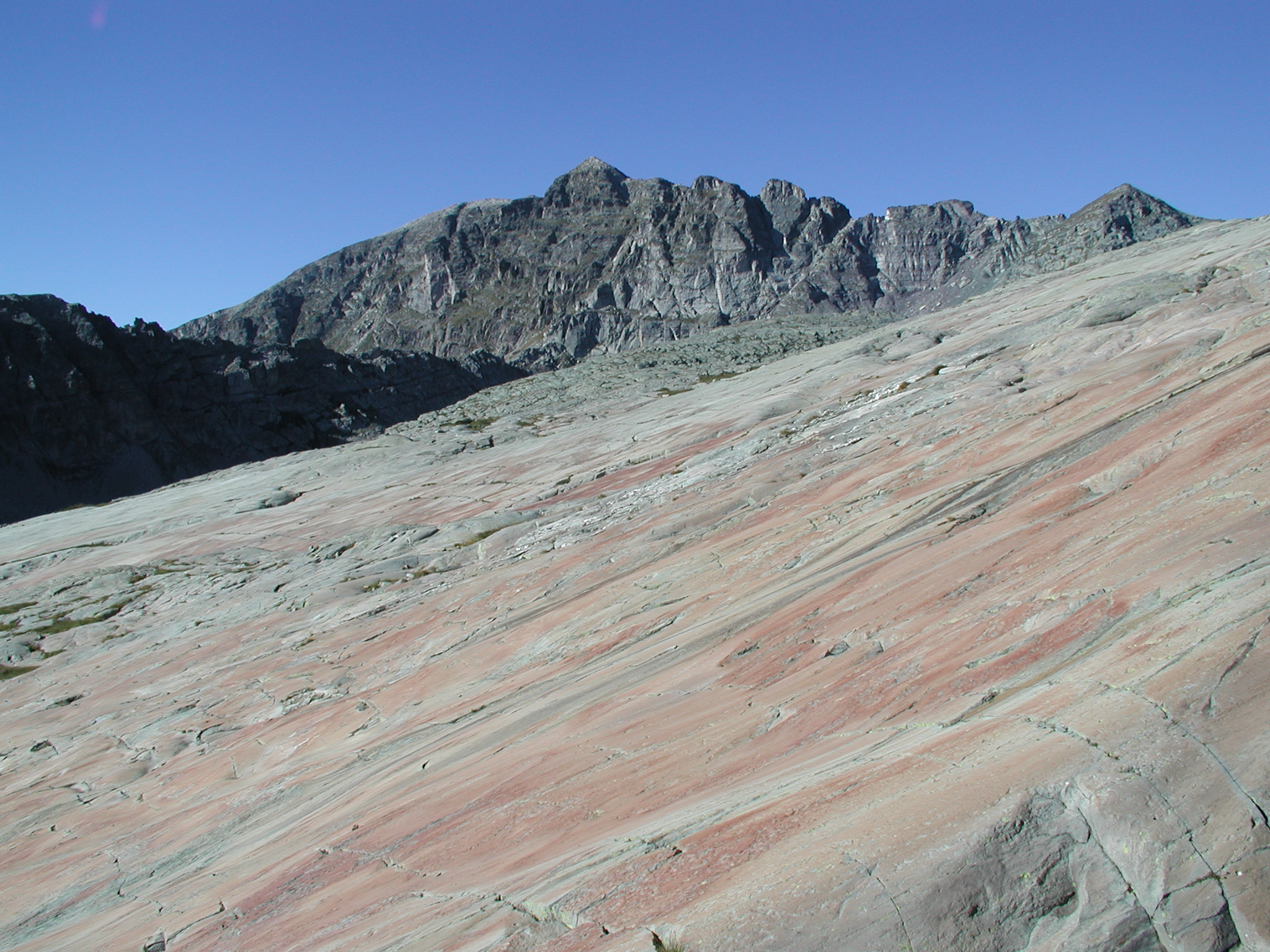
- The peak of Mont Bégo

Highest point
- Elevation: 2,872 m (9,423 ft)
- Prominence: 323 m (1,060 ft)
- Isolation: 1.91 km (1.19 mi)
- Listing: Alpine mountains 2500-2999 m
- Coordinates: 44°04′23″N 7°27′03″E

Geography
- Location within France
- Location: Provence-Alpes-Côte d'Azur, France
- Parent range: Maritime Alps

Mont Bégo (Italian: Monte Bego; Ligurian: Monte Begu) is a mountain in the Mercantour massif of the Maritime Alps, in southern France, with an elevation of 2,872 metres (9,423 ft). It is included in the Vallée des Merveilles ("Valley of Marvels").

== Etymology ==
The name derives from the ancient Indo-European root beg, meaning "divine"; it was, in fact a sacred area to the Liguri tribe, together with the Monte Beigua and Monte Sagro in Italy.

== Geology ==
It is mostly composed of conglomerates from the Permian period.

== SOIUSA classification ==
According to the SOIUSA (International Standardized Mountain Subdivision of the Alps) the mountain can be classified in the following way:

- main part = Western Alps
- major sector = South Western Alps
- section = Maritime Alps
- subsection = (Fr:Alpes Maritimes d.l.s.l./It:Alpi Marittime)
- supergroup = (Fr:Massif Gelas-Grand Capelet/It:Gelas-Grand Capelet)
- group = (Fr:Chaîne Basto-Grand Capelet/It:Costiera Basto-Grand Capelet)
- subgroup = (Fr:Nœud du Mont Bego/It:Nodo del Monte Bego)
- code = I/A-2.1-A.3.e
