= Massif du Mercantour-Argentera =

Mountain range in Alpes-Maritimes

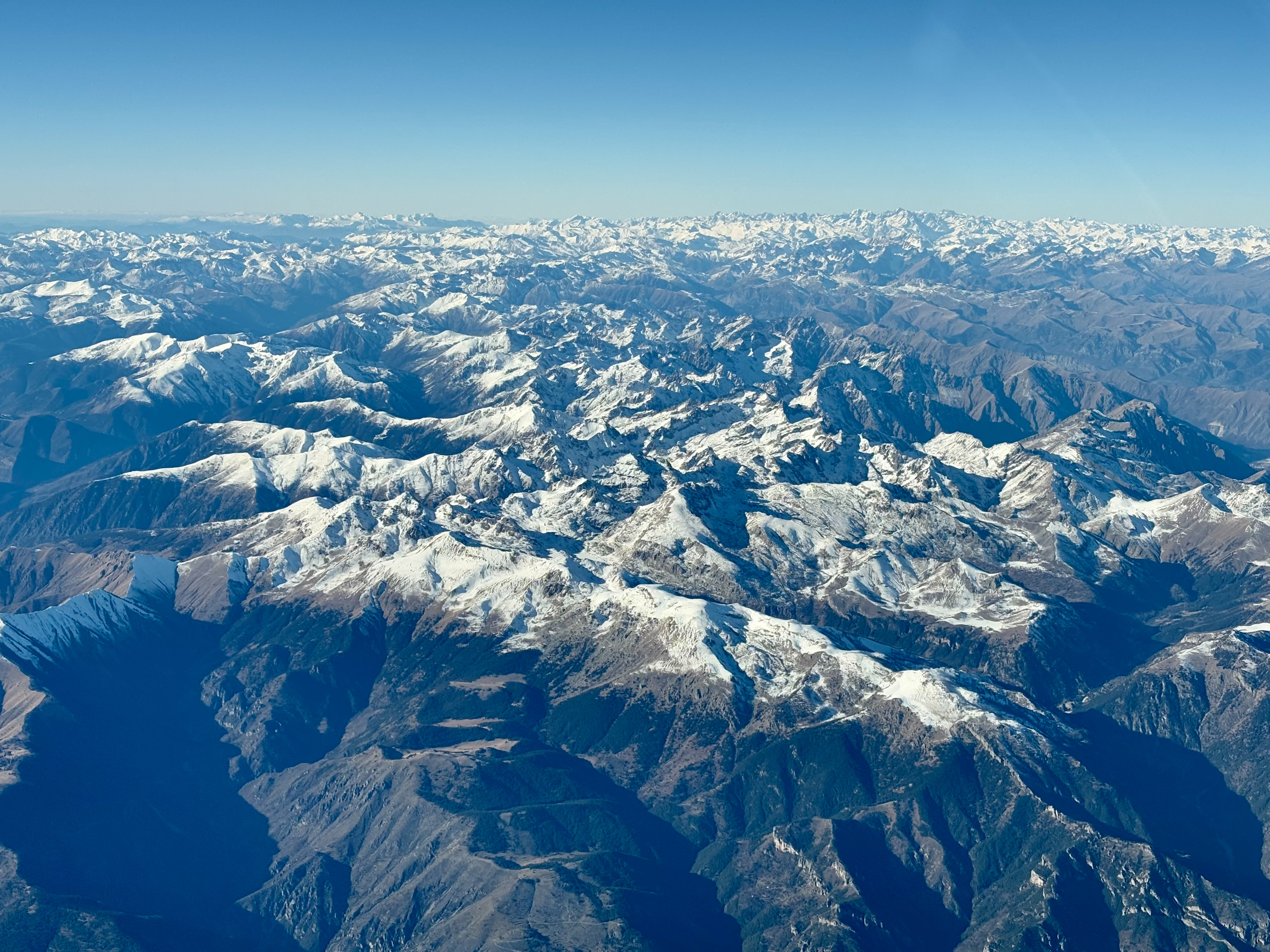
- Aerial view of the massif

Highest point
- Elevation: 3,297 m (10,817 ft)
- Parent peak: Monte Argentera
- Coordinates: 44°5′55″N 7°17′26″E

Dimensions
- Length: 80 km (50 mi)

Geography
- The massif is at the border of France and Italy, towards south
- Countries: France and Italy
- Departments and provinces: Alpes-Maritimes, Alpes-de-Haute-Provence, Cuneo
- Regions: Provence-Alpes-Côte d'Azur and Piedmont
- Parent range: Maritime Alps

Geology
- Rock age: Mesozoic

The Mercantour-Argentera massif (French: Massif du Mercantour-Argentera; Italian: Massiccio del Mercantour-Argentera) is a massif in the Maritime Alps located astride the French departments of Alpes-Maritimes and Alpes-de-Haute-Provence and the Italian region of Piedmont. The name of the massif comes respectively from the summit of Mercantour, a secondary central summit, and from Mount Argentera, the highest point of the massif (3,297 m (10,817 ft)), entirely in Italy.

The massif is partially covered by two natural parks, the Mercantour national park on the French side and the Maritime Alps natural park on the Italian side. These parks are important because they protect many rare animal and plant species, like Speleomantes strinatii and Saxifraga florulenta, which is only found in this massif and used to be a symbol of the Mercantour Park. The massif is also full of rivers and lakes, most of which were formed during the last Ice Age and are found in the basins of the massif's crystalline rocks.

This area has been home to humans since the Early Bronze Age, with signs of this early occupation particularly visible at Vallée des Merveilles. Human presence in the area grew during Antiquity and the Middle Ages, notably with the establishment of the salt route. In the 20th and 21st centuries, the massif has become a popular destination for tourism and recreation. The area offers a range of outdoor activities and sports, including ski touring, alpine skiing, cross-country skiing, hiking, mountaineering, and canyoning. Today, the economy of the massif is primarily focused on the tourism sector, which has largely overtaken agricultural and industrial activities.

The massif is associated with an important cultural heritage, which inspires artists as evident in its representations and appearances in painting, cinema, music and literature.

== Toponymy ==
In France, outside of academic circles, the massif is commonly referred to as the Mercantour massif. This name generally refers to the French part of the massif, which tends to be confused with the territory of the eponymous national park, although the latter is smaller in size.

The name massif du Mercantour is commonly used in the 21st century. However, its origin is attributed to a mistake made by French military topographers in the 19th century. These topographers, while conducting triangulation measurements from Côte d'Azur, identified a peak that appeared to be the highest. Upon visiting the location, they were informed by local shepherds that the mountain was known as the summit of Mercantour. Contrary to their initial perception, this peak does not exceed an altitude of 3,000 meters. The reason for their misjudgment was that from the coast, Mount Argentera, which is actually taller, was obscured by the Mercantour peak in their line of sight.

The etymology of "Mercantour" is based on a legend. Following the Roman conquest of Gaul, the newly acquired territory required a distinctive name. Informed by the prevailing Latin language of the Roman Empire, the Romans coined the term "Marcamtor" for this region. This composite name drew from three key elements:

1. Mar: Symbolizing the sea.
2. Cam: Representing the path or route.
3. Tor: Denoting the mountain.

Over time, linguistic shifts transformed "Marcamtor" into the present-day name, "Mercantour."

In France, the Italian part of this territory is called the Argentera massif. However, in Italy, the entire massif (i.e. both its Italian and French parts) is named Alpi Marittime.

== Geography ==
=== Location ===
The massif extends over the border part of the mountain range between the Rocher des Trois-Évêques (near the Col de la Bonette) and the Col de Tende.

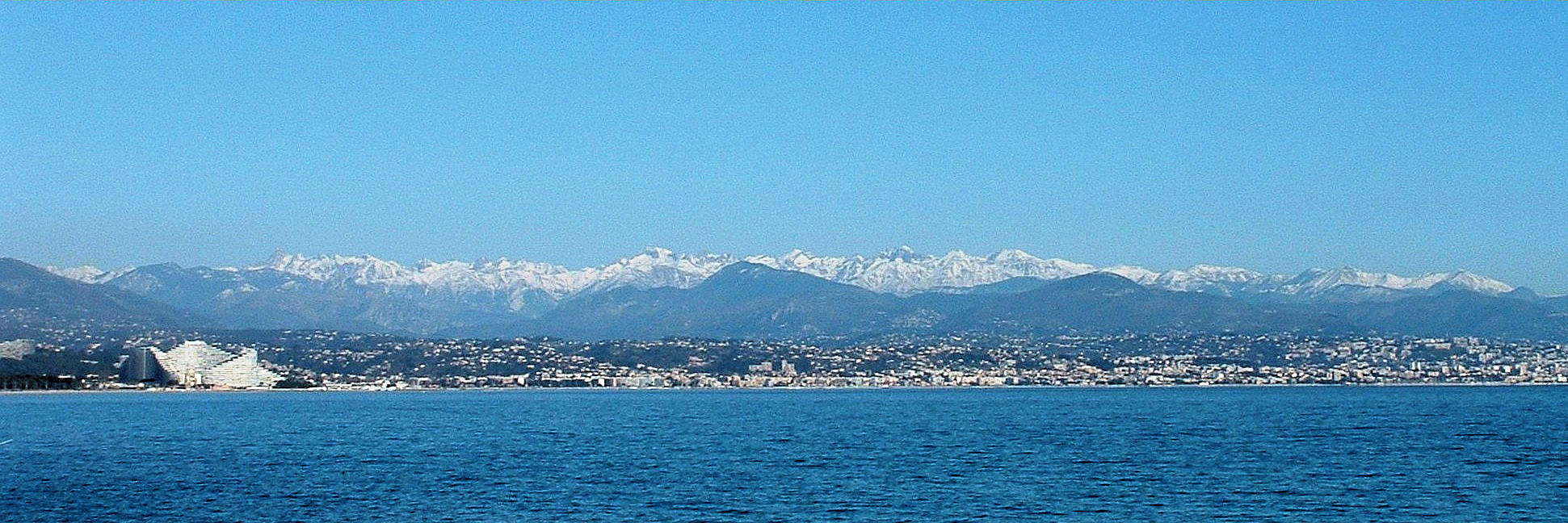
The Mercantour massif seen from the Baie des Anges in winter

=== Geomorphology ===
The massif is made up of a main range, oriented northwest–southeast, which serves as a natural Franco-Italian border. The crest line of this range represents a little more than 70 km. Four main orographic nodes exceeding 3,000 m altitude can be distinguished, from east to west:

- the Gélas-Malédie-Clapier group (culminating at 3,143 m), Gélas being the highest peak of the massif on the French side;
- the Argentera group (culminating at 3,297 m), whose southern summit is the highest peak of the massif;
- the Malinvern-Matto group (3,097 m);
- the Corborant-Ténibre group (3,031 m).

Six main valleys cross the massif or delimit its natural borders:

- in France, these are the valleys of Var, Tinée, Vésubie, and Roya (with the exception of the southern end of Roya, which is in Italy);
- in Italy, these are the valleys of Gesso, Stura di Demonte, and Vermenagna.

These valleys are generally very steep, forming impassable gorges in their lower part, but widening at intermediate altitudes (600 to 1,000 m), where the majority of human occupations are found.

The relief of the massif covers the entire northern half of the department of Alpes-Maritimes, in France, and the eastern end of the province of Cuneo, in Italy.

=== Access ===
The western and central areas of the massif are accessible from various routes. From the south, one can reach it from Nice via the Boulevard du Mercantour (formerly Route de Grenoble). This route serves the D6202, M2205, and M2565 roads, leading to the Var, Tinée, and Vésubie valleys respectively.

The eastern part of the massif can also be accessed from Nice via the D2204 road, and from Ventimiglia via the SS20 road. Both these roads converge at the Roya valley.

To the north of the massif, the Departmental Road 900 in France, which becomes the S21 and then the SS21 in Italy, connects the towns of Barcelonnette and Borgo San Dalmazzo. This route skirts the relief and serves all the valleys located to the north of the massif.

The Mercantour Massif is also accessible by rail. The train des Pignes, which connects Nice to Digne-les-Bains, runs along the southwest end of the massif. On the eastern side, the railway lines from Nice to Breil-sur-Roya and from Cuneo to Ventimiglia, often referred to as the Tende lines or the "Train of Wonders", provide access to the town of Tende.

=== Main summits ===
- Monte Argentera, 3,297 m (10,817 ft)
- Cima Genova, 3,191 m (10,469 ft)
- Cime du Gélas, 3,143 m (10,312 ft)
- Cima di Nasta, 3,108 m (10,197 ft)
- Monte Matto, 3,097 m (10,161 ft)
- Cime Chafrion, 3,073 m (10,082 ft)
- Cima del Baus, 3,067 m (10,062 ft)
- Cime de la Malédie, 3,059 m (10,036 ft)
- Cime de Brocan, 3,054 m (10,020 ft)
- Cime Paganini, 3,051 m (10,010 ft)
- Corno Stella (Piedmont), 3,050 m (10,010 ft)
- Cime Il Bastione, 3,047 m (9,997 ft)
- Monte Clapier, 3,045 m (9,990 ft)
- Cime Purtscheller, 3,040 m (9,970 ft)
- Tête de Siguret, 3,032 m (9,948 ft)
- Mont Ténibre, 3,031 m (9,944 ft)
- Cime de la Forchetta, 3,015 m (9,892 ft)
- Corborant, 3,007 m (9,865 ft)
- Cime Guilié, 2,999 m (9,839 ft)
- Tête de la Ruine, 2,984 m (9,790 ft)
- Claï supérieur, 2,982 m (9,783 ft)
- Enciastraia, 2,954 m (9,692 ft)
- Cime de Peirabroc, 2,947 m (9,669 ft)
- Cime Cabret, 2,938 m (9,639 ft)
- Mont Malinvern, 2,938 m (9,639 ft)
- Caïre de l'Agnel, 2,937 m (9,636 ft)
- Grand Capelet, 2,935 m (9,629 ft)
- Cime de l'Agnel, 2,927 m (9,603 ft)
- Cime Chamineye, 2,921 m (9,583 ft)
- Caïres de Cougourde, 2,921 m (9,583 ft)
- Cime Saint-Robert, 2,917 m (9,570 ft)
- Pointe Côte de l'Âne, 2,916 m (9,567 ft)
- Tête du Claus, 2,897 m (9,505 ft)
- Cime des Gaisses, 2,896 m (9,501 ft)
- Pointe Giegn, 2,888 m (9,475 ft)
- Fort Carra, 2,880 m (9,450 ft)
- Mont Bégo, 2,872 m (9,423 ft)
- Cime de la Bonette, 2,860 m (9,380 ft)
- Tête des Tablasses, 2,855 m (9,367 ft)
- Caïre du Préfouns, 2,835 m (9,301 ft)
- Cime du Lombard, 2,832 m (9,291 ft)
- Mont Ponset, 2,828 m (9,278 ft)
- Tête des Bresses, 2,823 m (9,262 ft)
- Cime de Baissette, 2,822 m (9,259 ft)
- Cime de Pal, 2,818 m (9,245 ft)
- Mont Mounier, 2,817 m (9,242 ft)
- Mont Colomb, 2,816 m (9,239 ft)
- Cime de la Lombarde, 2,800 m (9,200 ft)
- Cime de Tavels, 2,795 m (9,170 ft)
- Tête du Basto, 2,794 m (9,167 ft)
- Mont Neiglier, 2,786 m (9,140 ft)
- Cime du Mercantour, 2,772 m (9,094 ft)
- Mont Pélago, 2,768 m (9,081 ft)
- Tête de Trecolpas, 2,760 m (9,060 ft)
- Roche Grande, 2,752 m (9,029 ft)
- Caïres Nègres du Pélago, 2,745 m (9,006 ft)
- Tête du Lac-Autier, 2,740 m (8,990 ft)
- Cime de Frémamorte, 2,730 m (8,960 ft)
- Cime de Rogué, 2,705 m (8,875 ft)
- Cime de l'Agnellière, 2,700 m (8,900 ft)
- Cime du Diable, 2,685 m (8,809 ft)

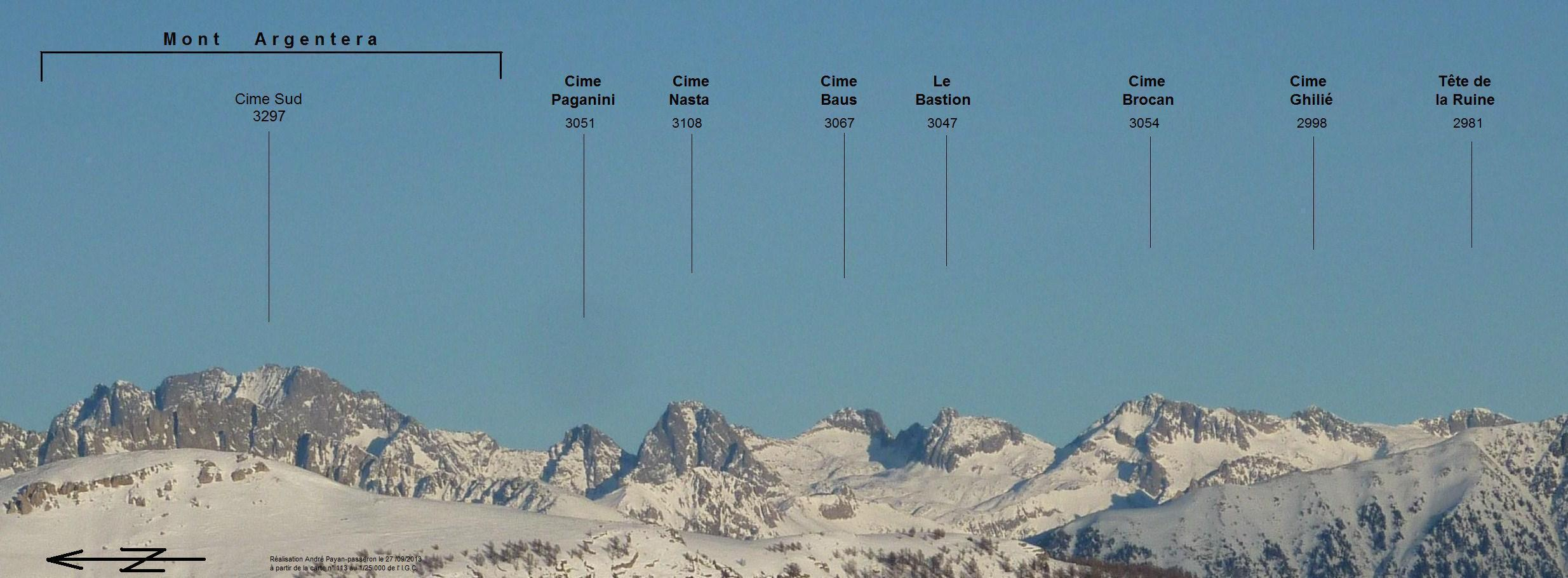
Panorama of the main range of the Argentera massif in Italian territory

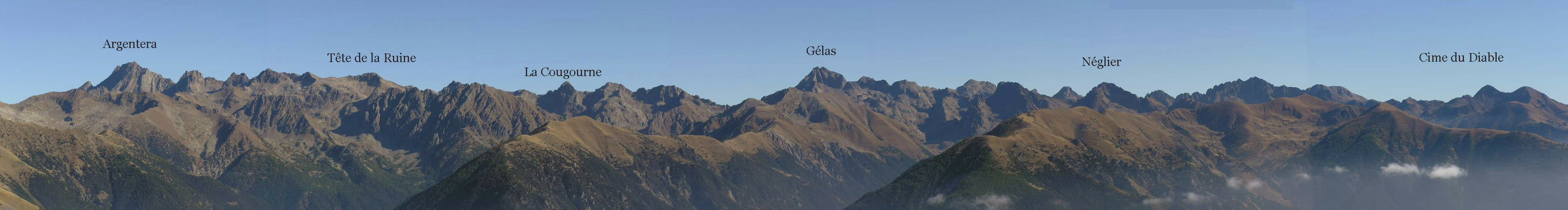
Panorama of the Mercantour massif

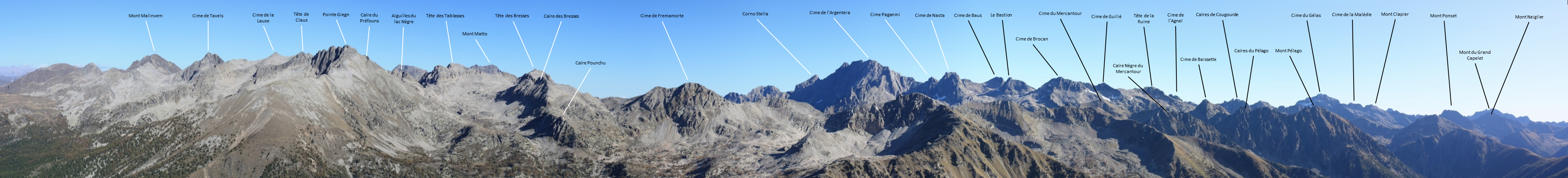
Panorama of the Mercantour-Argentera massif, taken from the summit of Caïre Archas

=== Hydrography ===
The French part of the massif corresponds largely to the watersheds of the tributaries on the left bank of the Var (notably the Tinée and the Vésubie) and the right bank of the Roya, (notably the Bévéra). On the Italian part, the massif corresponds to the right bank watershed of the Stura di Demonte, up to Cuneo (including in particular its tributaries Gesso and Vermenagna).

==== Lakes ====
The massif is home to just over 200 lakes, making it one of the territories with the highest lake densities in the French Alpine massifs. The origin of these lakes is primarily glacial. They are situated in basins that were formed by the erosion of glaciers during the Würm glaciation.

Major lakes on the French side (with altitudes):

- Lac Long (2,560 m (8,400 ft))
- Lac Long supérieur (2,110 m (6,920 ft))
- Lac Long inférieur (2,095 m (6,873 ft))
- Lac Fourca (2,165 m (7,103 ft))
- Lakes of Prals (2,275 m (7,464 ft))
- Lac Nègre (2,354 m (7,723 ft))
- Lac Autier (2,275 m (7,464 ft))
- Lacs Bessons (2,550 m (8,370 ft))
- Lac du Basto (2,341 m (7,680 ft))
- Lac Noir (2,278 m (7,474 ft))
- Lac Vert (2,221 m (7,287 ft))
- Lac de la Fous (2,180 m (7,150 ft))
- Lac de la Muta (2,274 m (7,461 ft))
- Lac de l'Agnel (2,645 m (8,678 ft))
- Lac du Mercantour (2,454 m (8,051 ft))
- Lakes of Vens (2,327 m (7,635 ft))
- Lac du Boréon (1,473 m (4,833 ft))
- Lac de Tavels (2,235 m (7,333 ft))
- Lacs de Terre-Rouge (2,452 m (8,045 ft))
- Lac de Rabuons (2,500 m (8,200 ft))
- Lac Blanc (2,665 m (8,743 ft))
- Lac Clapière (2,625 m (8,612 ft))
- Lacs des Adus (2,130 m (6,990 ft))
- Lac de Trecolpas (2,150 m (7,050 ft))

Major lakes on the Italian side (with altitudes):

- Lac Vei del Bouc (2,054 m (6,739 ft))
- Lac Brocan (2,000 m (6,600 ft))
- Lac du Claus (2,344 m (7,690 ft))
- Lac de la Rovine (1,535 m (5,036 ft))
- Lac Sottano della Sella (1,882 m (6,175 ft))
- Grand lac Valscura (2,274 m (7,461 ft))
- Lac Chiotas (1,978 m (6,490 ft))
- Lac Soprano della Sella (2,329 m (7,641 ft))
- Lac Malinvern (2,123 m (6,965 ft))
- Lac de Portette (2,361 m (7,746 ft))
- Lakes of Italian Frémamorte (2,380 m (7,810 ft))
- Lakes of Lausfer (2,370 m (7,780 ft))
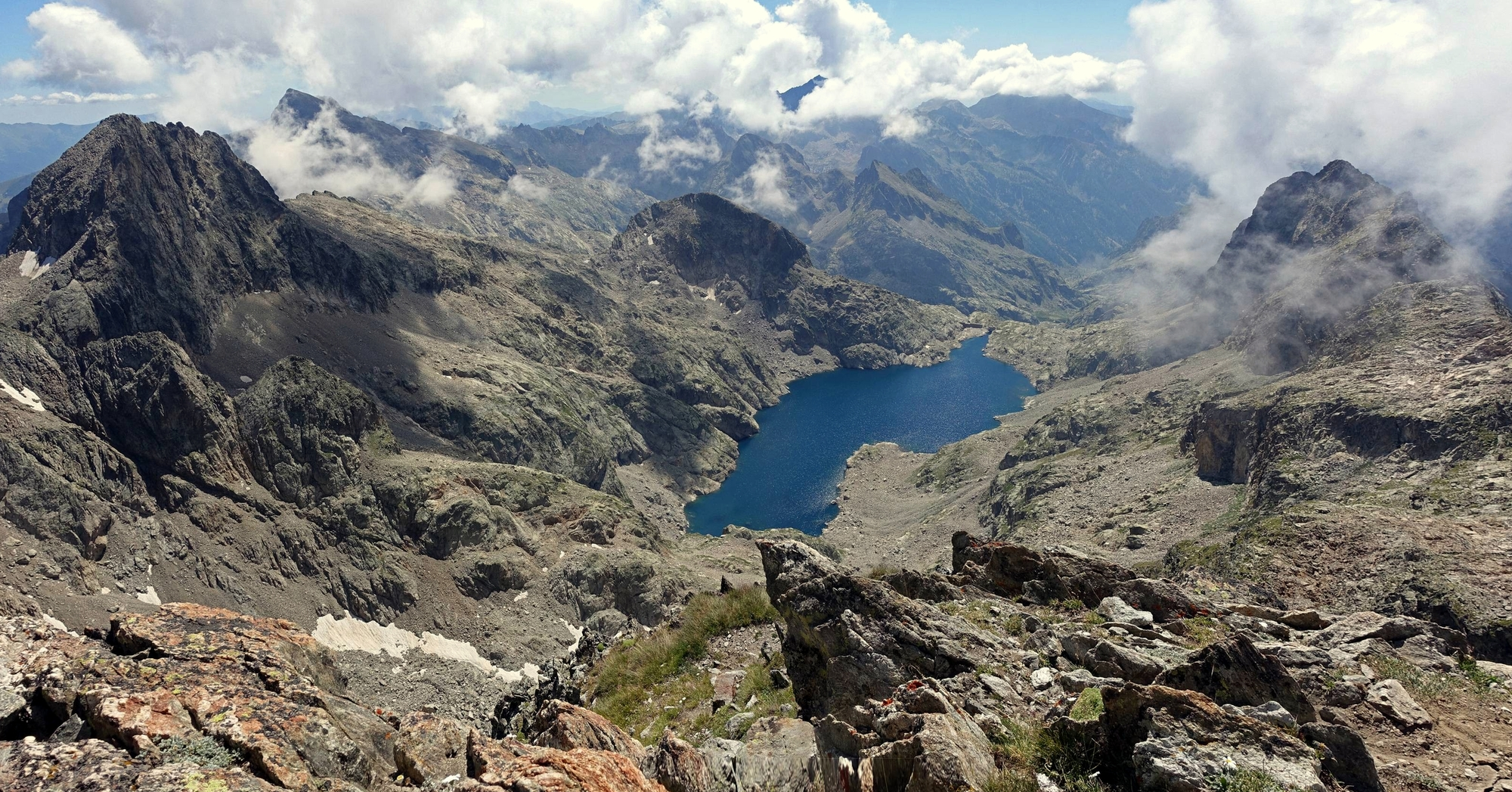
Lac Long in the Gordolasque valley

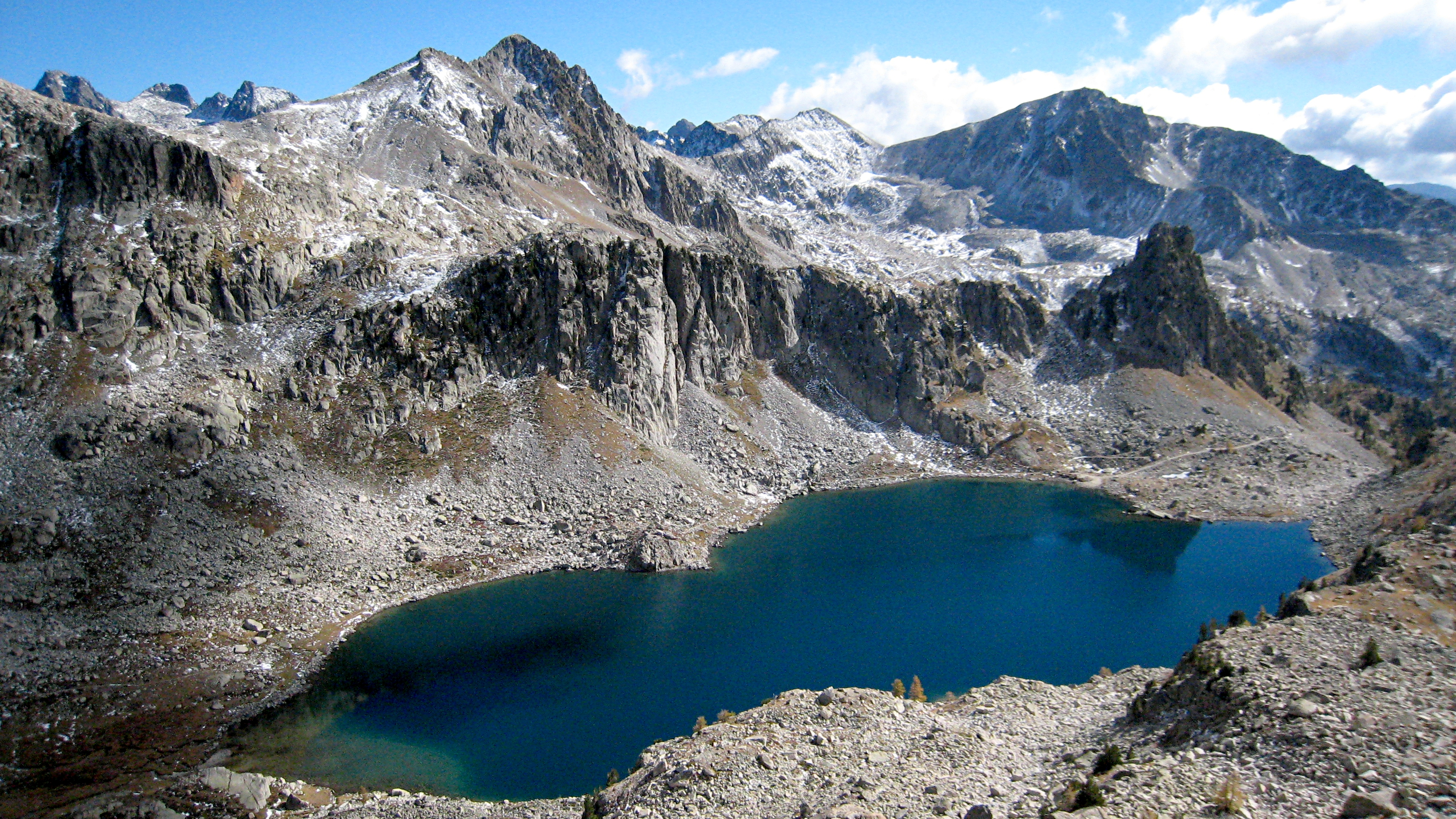
Lac Négre

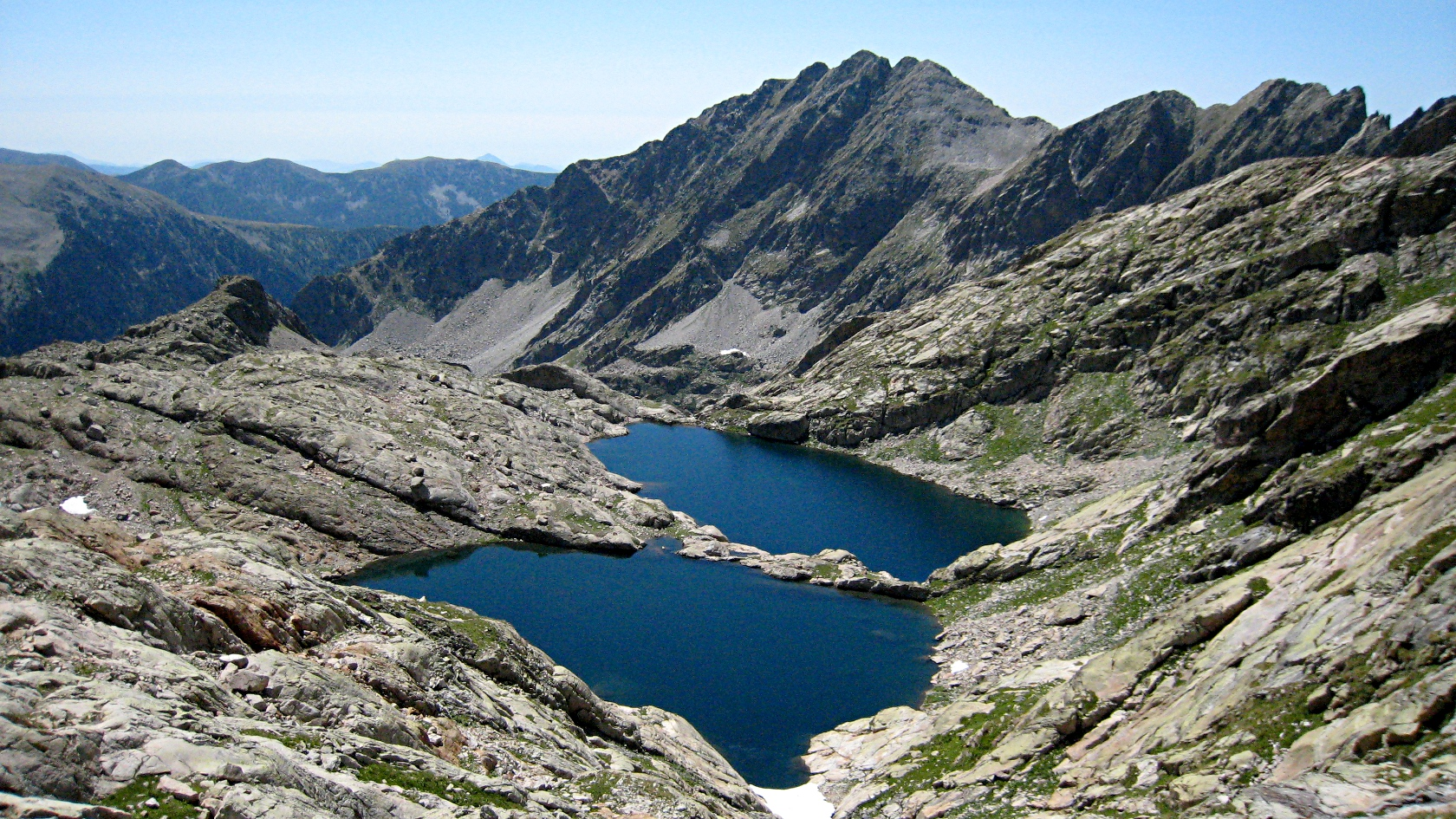
Lacs Bessons

==== Watercourses ====
The massif benefits from more abundant rainfall than the surrounding low valleys and plains and plays the role of a water reserve for the latter. Notable watercourses within the massif are as follows:

In France
- Vens
- Tinée
- Gialorgues
- Boréon
- Rabuons
- Gordolasque
- Tuébi
- Var
- Sestrières
- Vésubie
- Cians
- Roya
- Bévéra
- Barlatte
- Roudoule
- Ardon

In Italy

- Gesso di Entracque
- Gesso della Valletta
- Valle Grande
- Cros
- Rio Roaschia
- Colomart
- Vallasco
- Sant'anna
- Vermenagna
- Gesso
- Stura di Demonte
- Sottana
- Bousset
- Bucera
- Valletta
- Rio Freddo
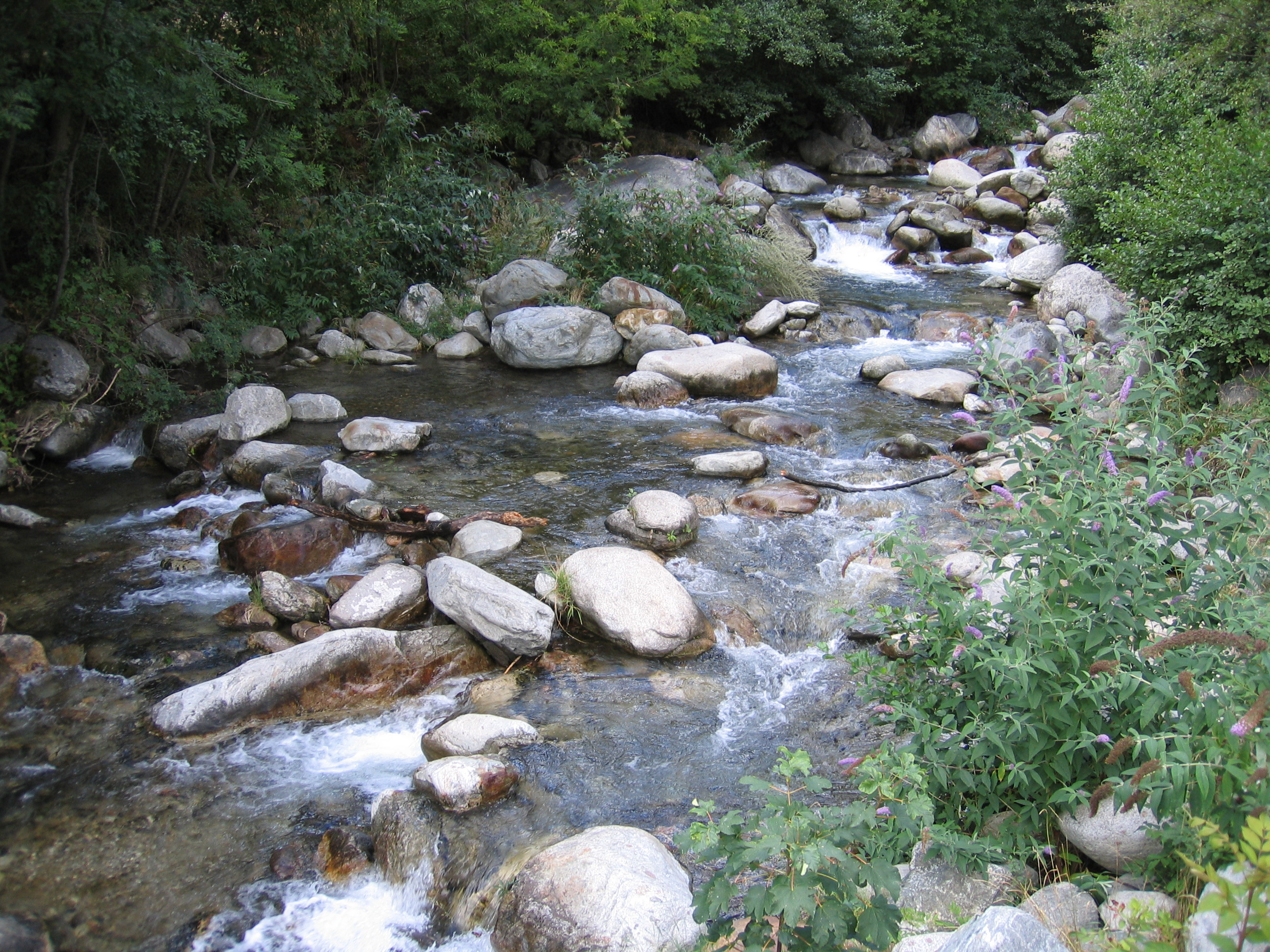
Vésubie

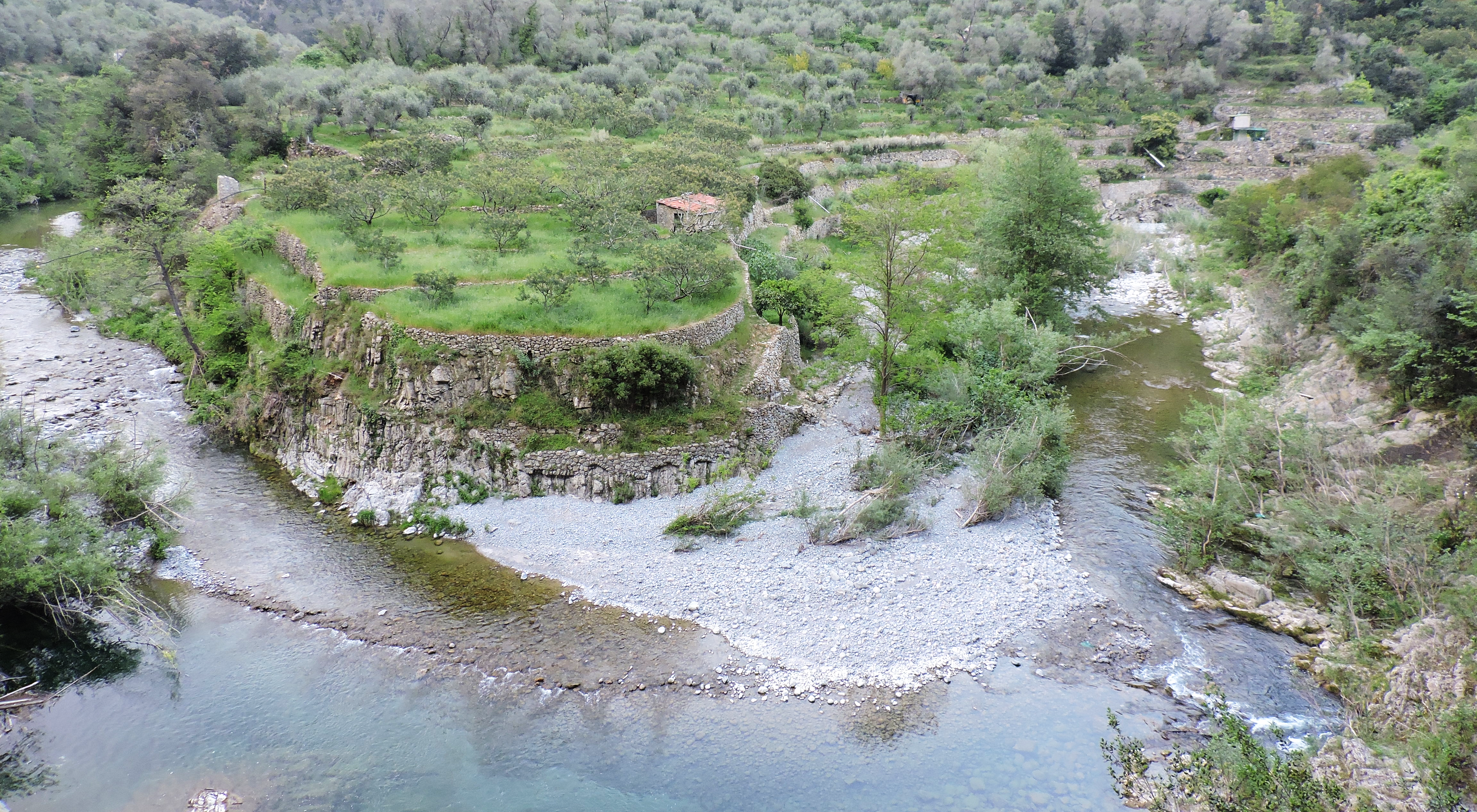
Bévéra

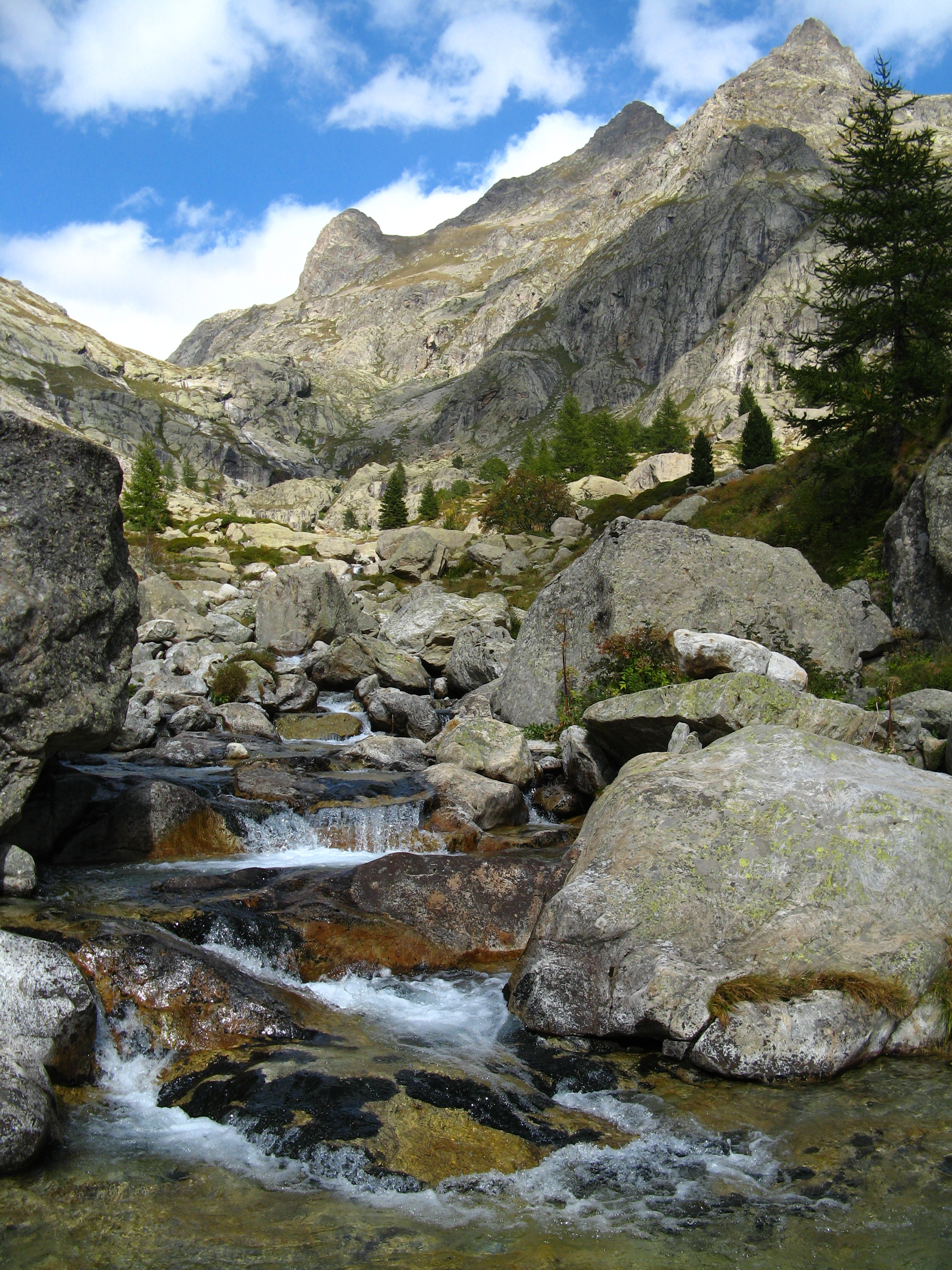
Gordolasque

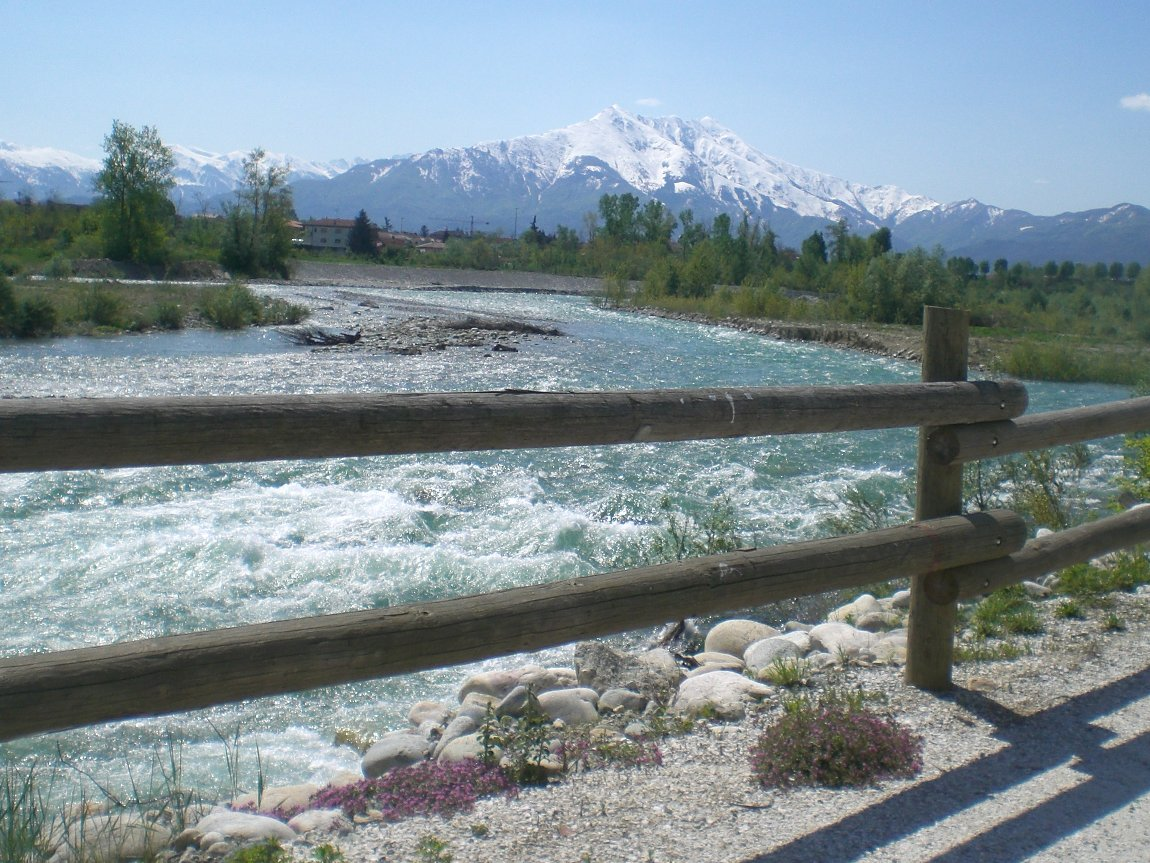
Gesso

==== Glaciers ====
The massif was characterized by the presence of several glaciers by the end of the 20th century. During the early 1930s, these glaciers, located on the Italian slopes, covered an area of approximately 200 hectares. However, by the start of the 21st century, these glaciers had either vanished or were reduced to inert ice beneath the moraine. At the beginning of the 20th century, the main glaciers of the massif were the following:

- Gélas Glaciers (43 ha)
- Clapier Glacier (40 ha)
- Maledie Glacier (31 ha)
- Peirabroc Glacier (15 ha)
- Murajon Glacier (14 ha)
- Lourousa Glacier (12 ha)
- Schiantala Glacier (11 ha)
- Ubac Glacier (9 ha)
- Corborant Glacier (7 ha)
- Cessole Glacier (5 ha)

=== Geology ===
==== Orogeny ====
In geological terms, the massif has an elliptical shape with a northwest–southeast axis. It is part of the external crystalline massifs of the Alps chain, being the southernmost of them. This massif is a fragment of the continental crust of the Hercynian chain. It has undergone deformation and Alpine metamorphism, with the events of the Alpine orogeny superimposed on Paleozoic events. This has resulted in a massif composed of very old crystalline rocks, dating back at least 350 million years.

Four main complexes can be distinguished within the massif:

- the Tinée complex (made up of migmatites and gneiss);
- the Gesso-Stura-Vésubie complex (composed of migmatite, anatexites and amphibolites);
- the Permian granites, in the center of massif;
- the mylonite of Valletta-Mollières, crossing the massif from one side to the other, along the northwest – southeast axis, composed mainly of mica schists.

To the east of the massif, more recent sedimentary rocks such as limestone, schist, and the purplish sandstone of the Vallée des Merveilles can be found. Similarly, to the north and west of the massif, along the edges of the Ubaye, Tinée, and Var valleys, alluvium is still present.

==== Glaciations ====
The study of Alpine glaciations has shed light on the impact of glacial periods on the massif. While knowledge about very ancient glaciations remains fragmentary as of the early 21st century, the effects of the Riss and Würm glaciations have been better understood since the early 20th century. The Würm glaciation, in particular, significantly reshaped the landscapes and altered the moraine traces of the Riss glaciation. Field data analysis, especially from the Italian Stura di Demonte valley, has helped establish the glacial maximum during the Riss period. The maximum advance of the glacier terminus was located between the communes of Saint-Martin-Vésubie and Lantosque in Vésubie on the French side. During the Würmian period, the Gordolasque glacier, which was particularly large, reached a thickness of 300 meters.

The traces left by these glaciers are visible within the massif in the form of erratic blocks as well as rocks scraped or polished by the action of ice are widespread there, particularly in the Merveilles and Fontanalbe valleys.

==== Seismicity ====
The French part of the massif is mainly located in a zone of average seismicity. The Vésubie valley in particular was affected by major earthquakes during the 15th, 16th and 17th centuries. The Italian part of the massif is located in a zone of low to medium seismicity.

=== Climate ===
The climate of the massif is characterized by hot and dry summers and mild winters, typical of a mountainous region. The climatic conditions within the massif are diverse due to its geographical location, being subject to both Alpine influences in the north and Mediterranean influences in the south. Consequently, the massif experiences milder temperatures, on average for a given altitude, compared to massifs located further north.

The existence of three topoclimates, namely adret, ubac, and fond de vallée, is confirmed by records from meteorological stations installed in the upper Vésubie. Rainfall patterns across the massif vary, decreasing from east to west. The Roya valley receives the highest rainfall, while the Var valley receives the least. Overall, the massif experiences abundant precipitation, exceeding 1,000 mm per year, which is often intense, especially in autumn.

The massif is sensitive to the Foehn effect and is influenced by the depression of the Gulf of Genoa, which results in cold winds, such as the Lombarde wind, blowing from the east. In winter, the snow cover follows the same geographical distribution as precipitation and can often reach several meters. The massif is also experiencing the effects of global warming, with an increase in temperature of 0.3 °C per decade over the period from 1959 to 2009.

Climate data for Massif du Mercantour-Argentera
Month	Jan	Feb	Mar	Apr	May	Jun	Jul	Aug	Sep	Oct	Nov	Dec	Year
Record high °C (°F)	19.0 (66.2)	20.0 (68.0)	20.2 (68.4)	21.3 (70.3)	29.0 (84.2)	27.5 (81.5)	31.6 (88.9)	30.1 (86.2)	27.0 (80.6)	23.2 (73.8)	19.5 (67.1)	15.5 (59.9)	31.6 (88.9)
Mean daily maximum °C (°F)	3.3 (37.9)	4.4 (39.9)	6.9 (44.4)	9.1 (48.4)	13.5 (56.3)	17.7 (63.9)	21.1 (70.0)	20.9 (69.6)	16.5 (61.7)	12.4 (54.3)	7.2 (45.0)	3.7 (38.7)	11.4 (52.5)
Daily mean °C (°F)	−2.1 (28.2)	−1.6 (29.1)	1.2 (34.2)	3.6 (38.5)	7.7 (45.9)	11.2 (52.2)	14.1 (57.4)	13.8 (56.8)	10.1 (50.2)	6.7 (44.1)	2.1 (35.8)	−1.2 (29.8)	5.5 (41.9)
Mean daily minimum °C (°F)	−7.5 (18.5)	−7.6 (18.3)	−4.5 (23.9)	−1.9 (28.6)	1.9 (35.4)	5.0 (41.0)	7.2 (45.0)	6.8 (44.2)	3.8 (38.8)	1.0 (33.8)	−3.0 (26.6)	−6.1 (21.0)	−0.4 (31.3)
Record low °C (°F)	−22.0 (−7.6)	−22.0 (−7.6)	−20.0 (−4.0)	−14.5 (5.9)	−11.0 (12.2)	−3.0 (26.6)	−0.5 (31.1)	−4.5 (23.9)	−6.0 (21.2)	−11.0 (12.2)	−17.0 (1.4)	−18.0 (−0.4)	−22.0 (−7.6)
Average precipitation mm (inches)	103.2 (4.06)	59.7 (2.35)	77.8 (3.06)	125.7 (4.95)	116.4 (4.58)	90.3 (3.56)	74.4 (2.93)	72.1 (2.84)	98.6 (3.88)	163.2 (6.43)	178.4 (7.02)	110.0 (4.33)	1,269.8 (49.99)
Source: Infoclimat.fr

=== Flora and fauna ===
The Mercantour-Argentera massif benefits from exceptional biological wealth, with a very high rate of endemism.

==== Flora ====
The massif is home to more than 2,000 plant species, which represents more than half of the species present in the Provence-Alpes-Côte d'Azur region, and more than 40% of the French native flora.

The supra-Mediterranean level is dominated by forests of common ash (Fraxinus excelsior) and chestnut (Castanea sativa). On the right side, the slopes are largely populated by formations of juniper (Juniperus thurifera).

On the subalpine level, larch (Larix decidua) and stone pine (Pinus cembra) dominate, mixed with Rhododendron heaths (Rhododendron ferrugineum). Well-developed megaphorbs of Adenostylion alliariae border the numerous watercourses of the subalpine level. These wetlands include endemic species, such as the elegant cherophyll (Chaerophyllum elegans), the Balbis ragwort (Tephroseris balbisiana), the mountain cirsus (Cirsium alsophilum) and the Austrian Doronicum (Doronicum austriacum). Acidic lakes and ponds with black sedge (Carex nigra) allow observation of Caricion fuscae which shelter rare species such as the round-leaved sundew (Drosera rotundifolia), the short sedge (Carex canescens) and various species of sphagnum moss (Sphagnum auriculatum, Sphagnum teres, Sphagnum russowii, and Sphagnum warnstorfii).

The siliceous rock walls, located on the subalpine to alpine levels, are dominated by endemic species: the heart-leaved silene (Silene cordifolia) and the many-flowered Saxifrage (Saxifraga florulenta). The limestone walls are also populated by endemic species: the bellflower (Silene campanulata) and the heart-leaved rapunzel (Phyteuma cordatum).

At the alpine stage, the lakes, numerous in the massif, are populated with narrow-leaved ribbon tree (Sparganium angustifolium). Silicicolous snow valleys, also widespread in the Alpine stage, allow the development of Salicetum herbaceae.

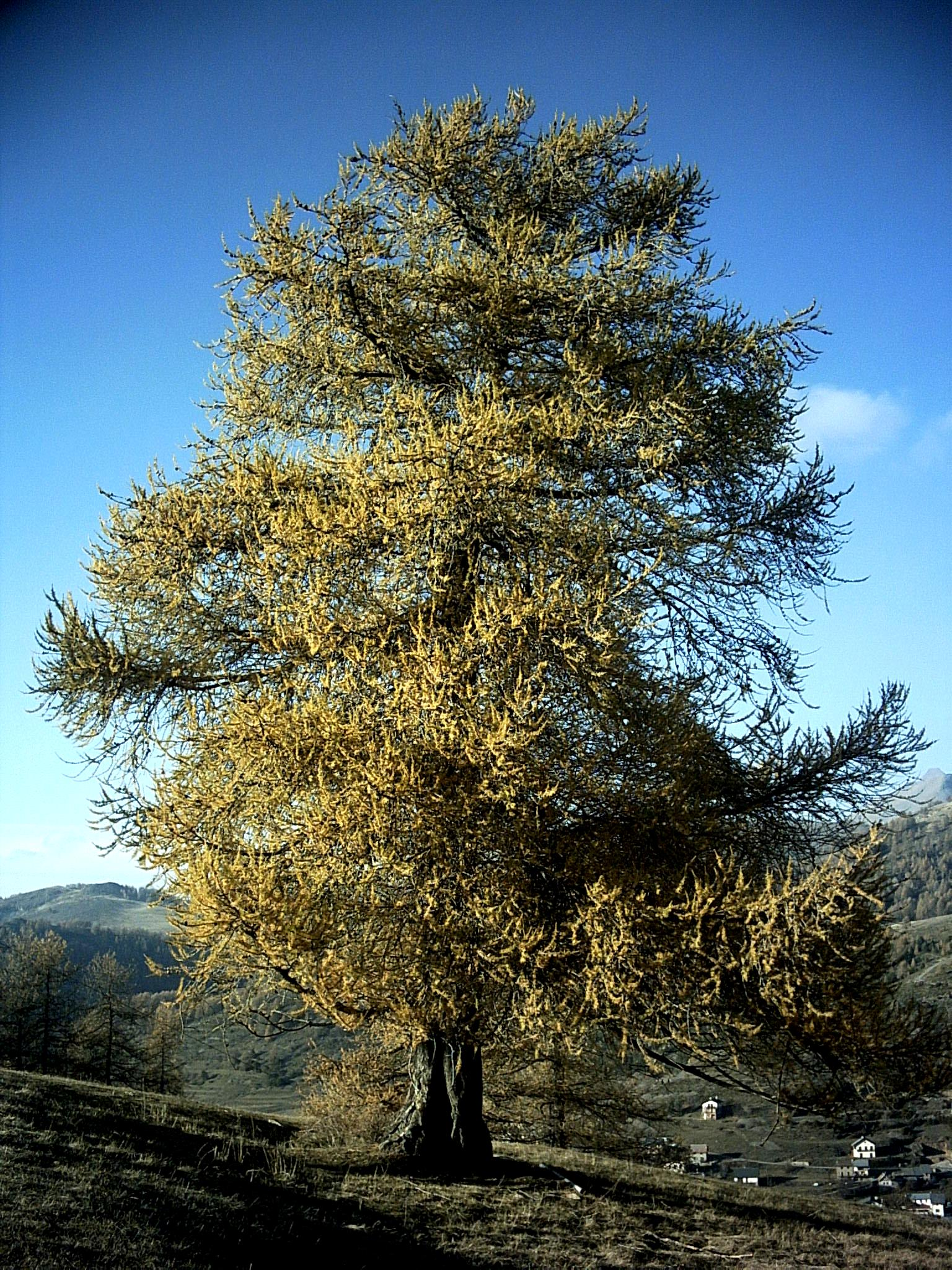
Larix decidua

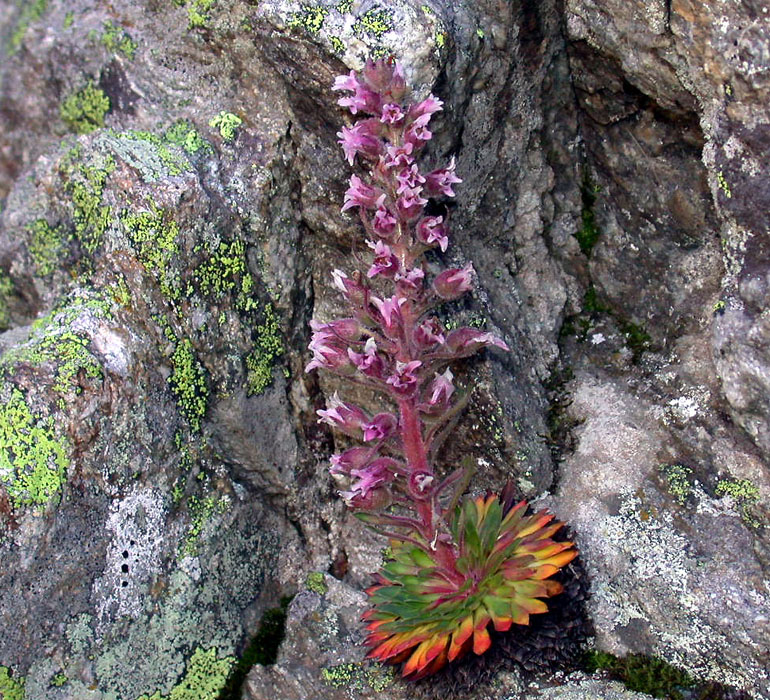
Saxifraga florulenta

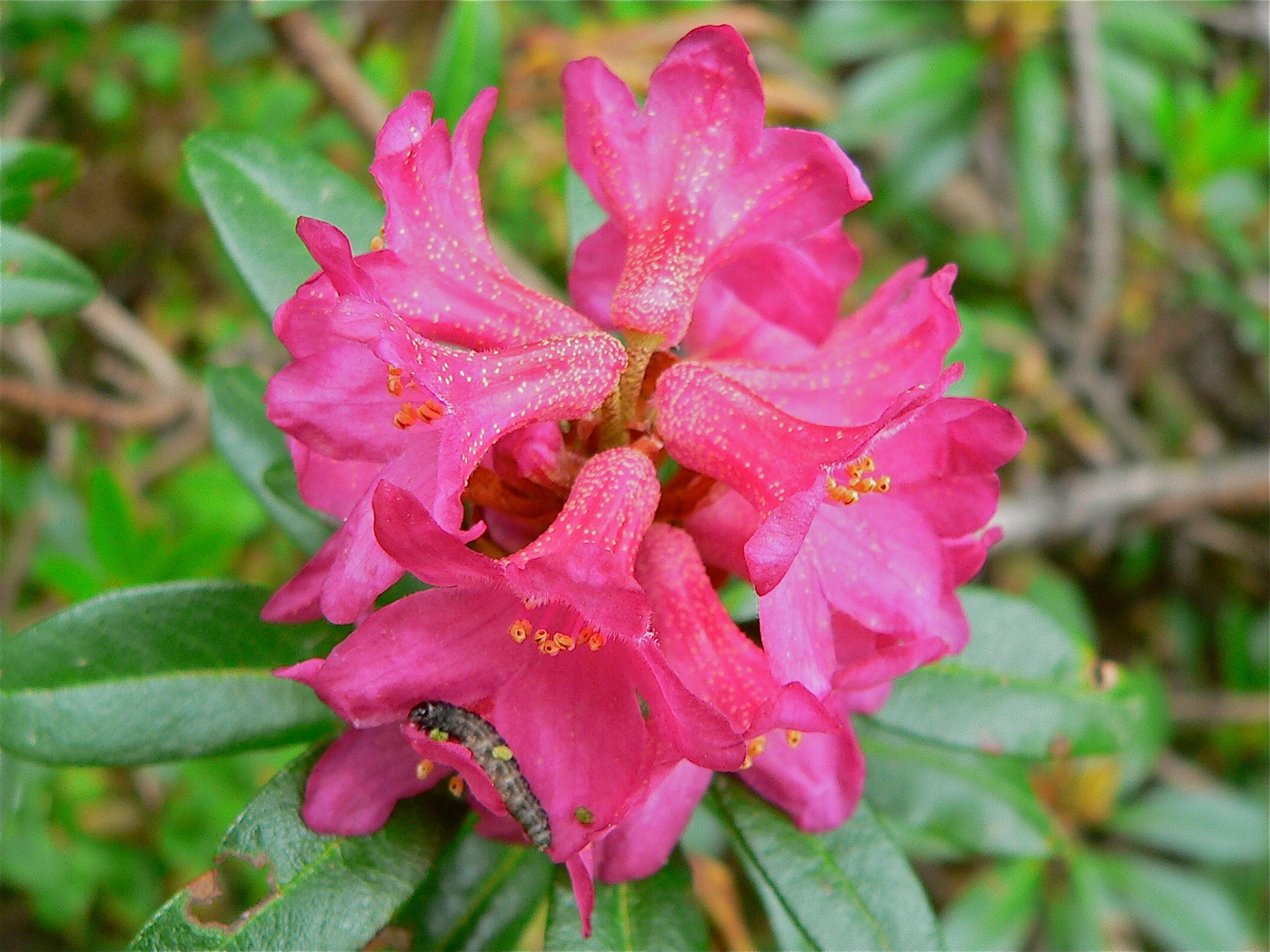
Rhododendron ferrugineum

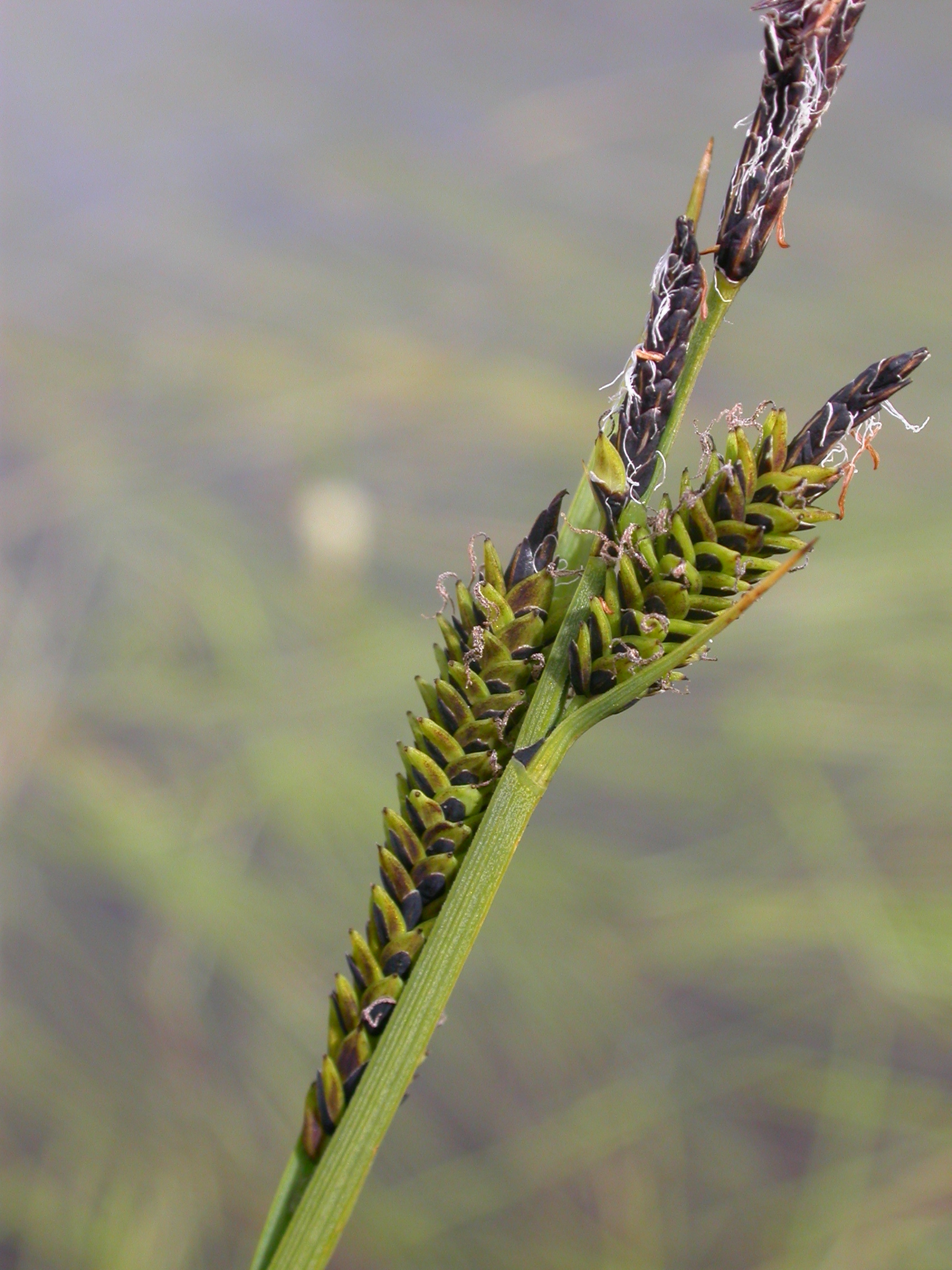
Carex nigra

==== Fauna ====
The massif is populated by many animal species, of which 99 are of natural heritage and 48 are 'determinant' species.

The mammals of the massif are often rare or endemic, such as: the Alpine ibex (determinant), the mountain hare, the gray wolf (determinant), and Alpine pine vole. Different species of bat are also present like the greater horseshoe bat (determinant), the greater noctule bat, the lesser horseshoe bat, the lesser noctule bat, the northern bat (determinant), Savi's pipistrelle and the common barbastelle (determinant).

Many species of birds are present, of which 3 are determinant: the peregrine falcon, the boreal owl, and the Eurasian pygmy owl. Several other remarkable species populate the massif, such as: golden eagle, rock ptarmigan, black grouse, rock partridge, Eurasian eagle-owl, white-throated dipper, wallcreeper, common rock thrush, red-billed chough, hawfinch, citril finch, white-winged snowfinch and Ortolan bunting.

The massif is home to a variety of amphibians and reptiles. Among the amphibians, the Speleomantes strinatii is noteworthy. This species is very localized in the region and can be found at altitudes up to 2,400 metres. In terms of reptiles, the sand lizard is present up to an altitude of 2,000 metres. The local populations of this species are isolated and fragmented.

Insects are also represented by rare or endemic species, such as the alpine emerald dragonfly (determinant), the French grasshopper (determinant), the Ligurian alpine-bush cricket (determinant), ephippiger, the Mercantour alpine-bush cricket, and Acalypta visolensis (determinant). 6 species of beetles are also determinant (Amara lantoscana, Licinus oblongus, Cychrus angulicollis, Bembidion decorum decorum, Trechus delarouzeei and Tragosoma depsarium).

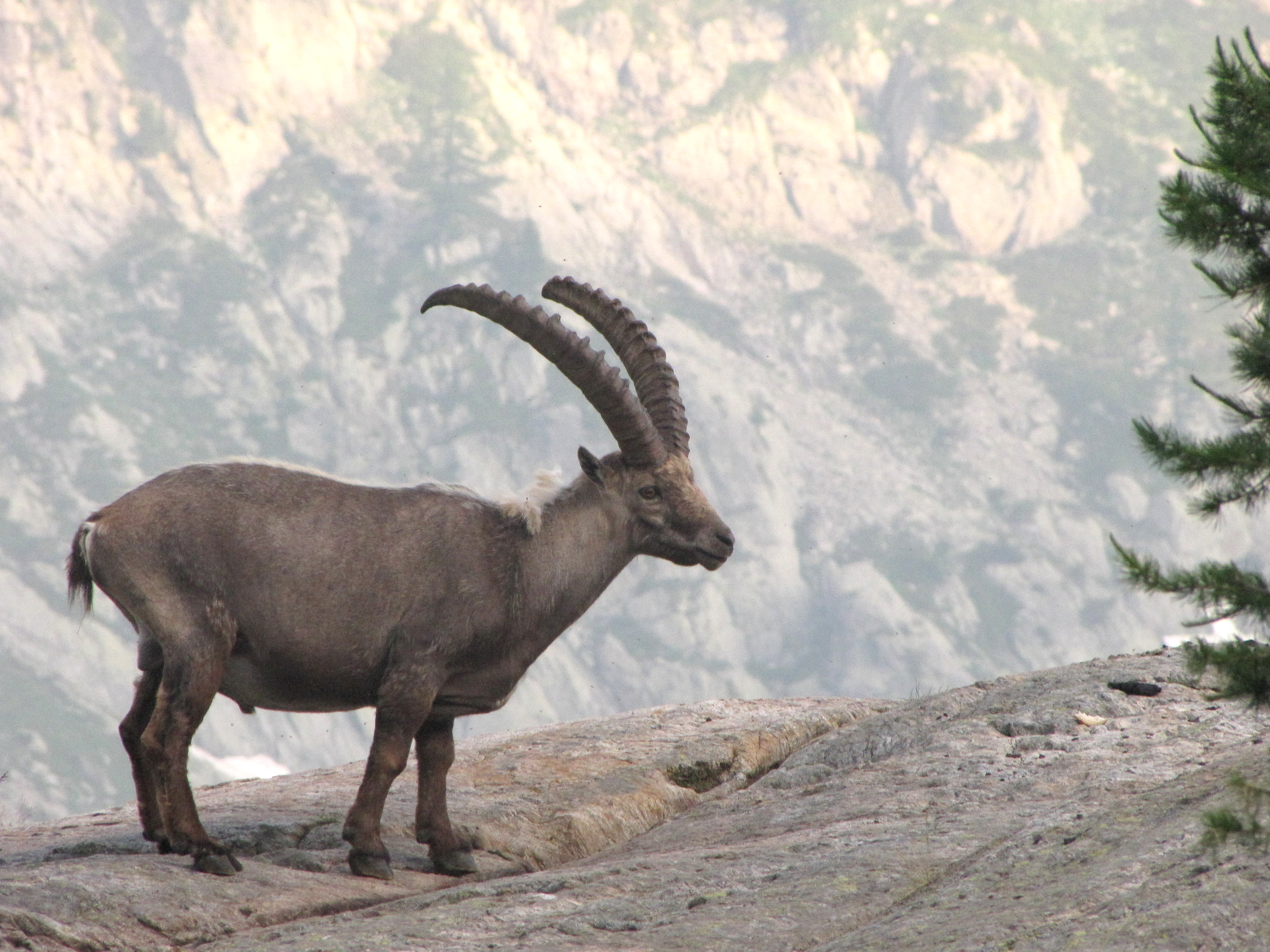
Male ibex near the Cougourde refuge

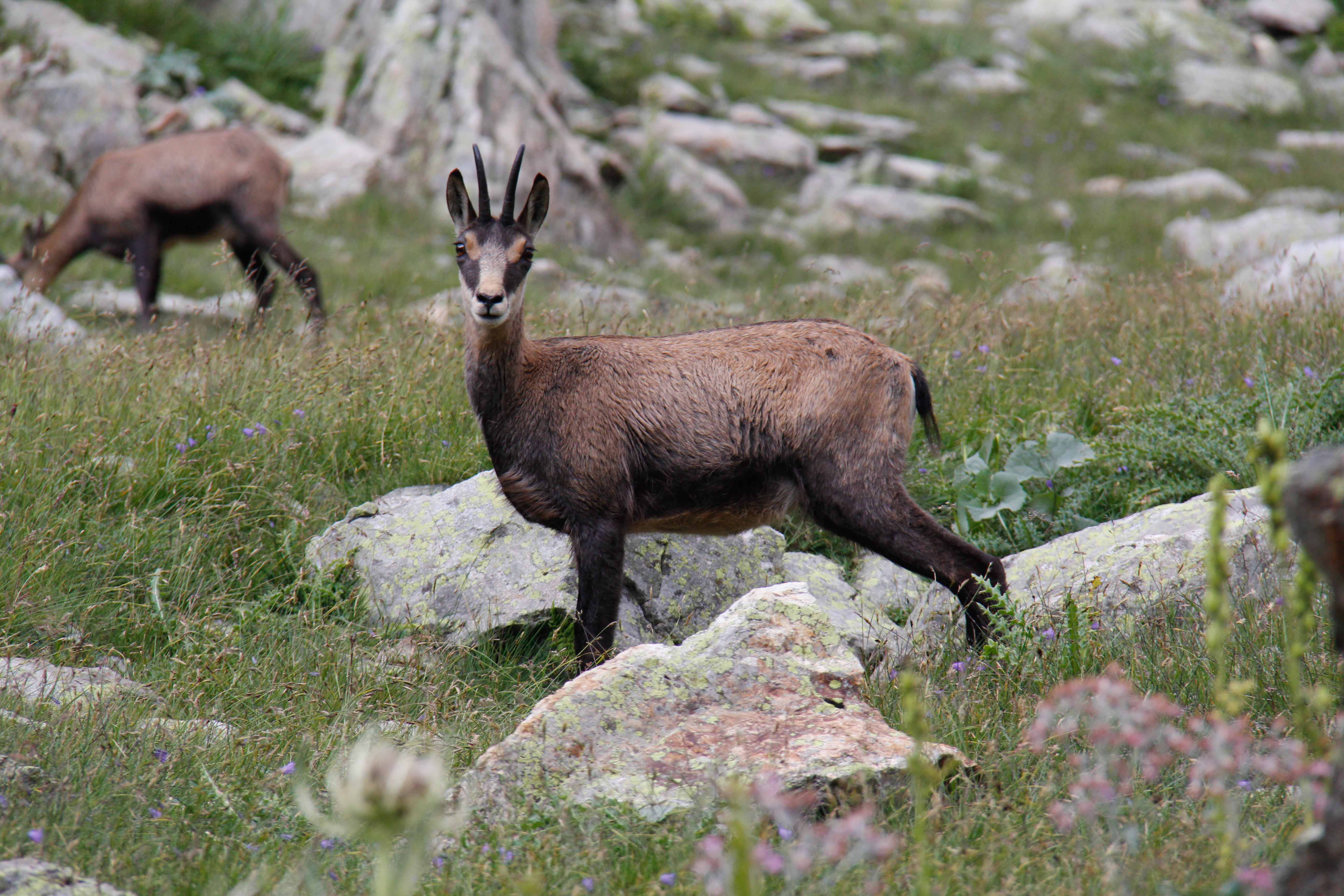
Chamois at Madonna de Fenestre

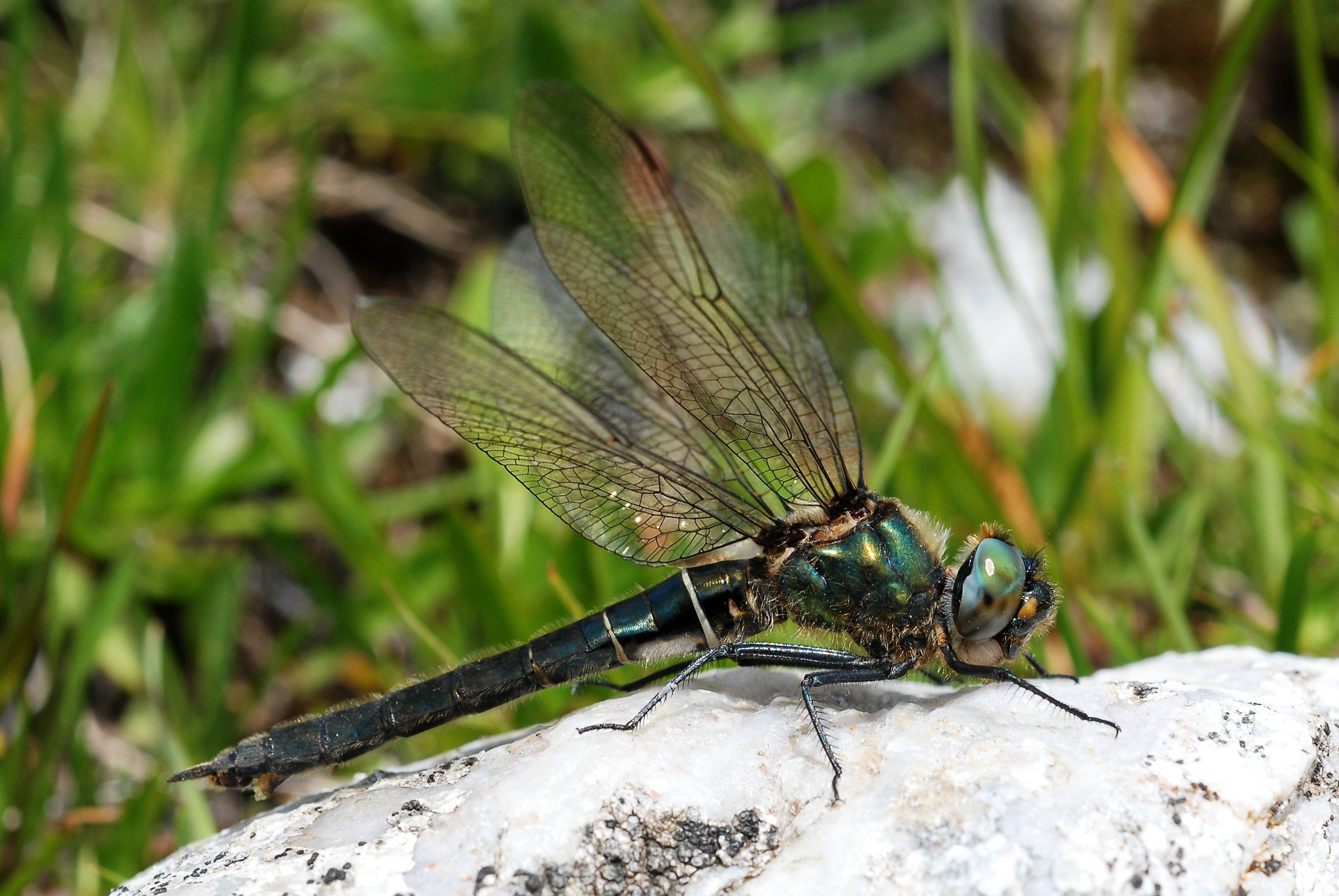
Somatochlora alpestris at Vanoise national park

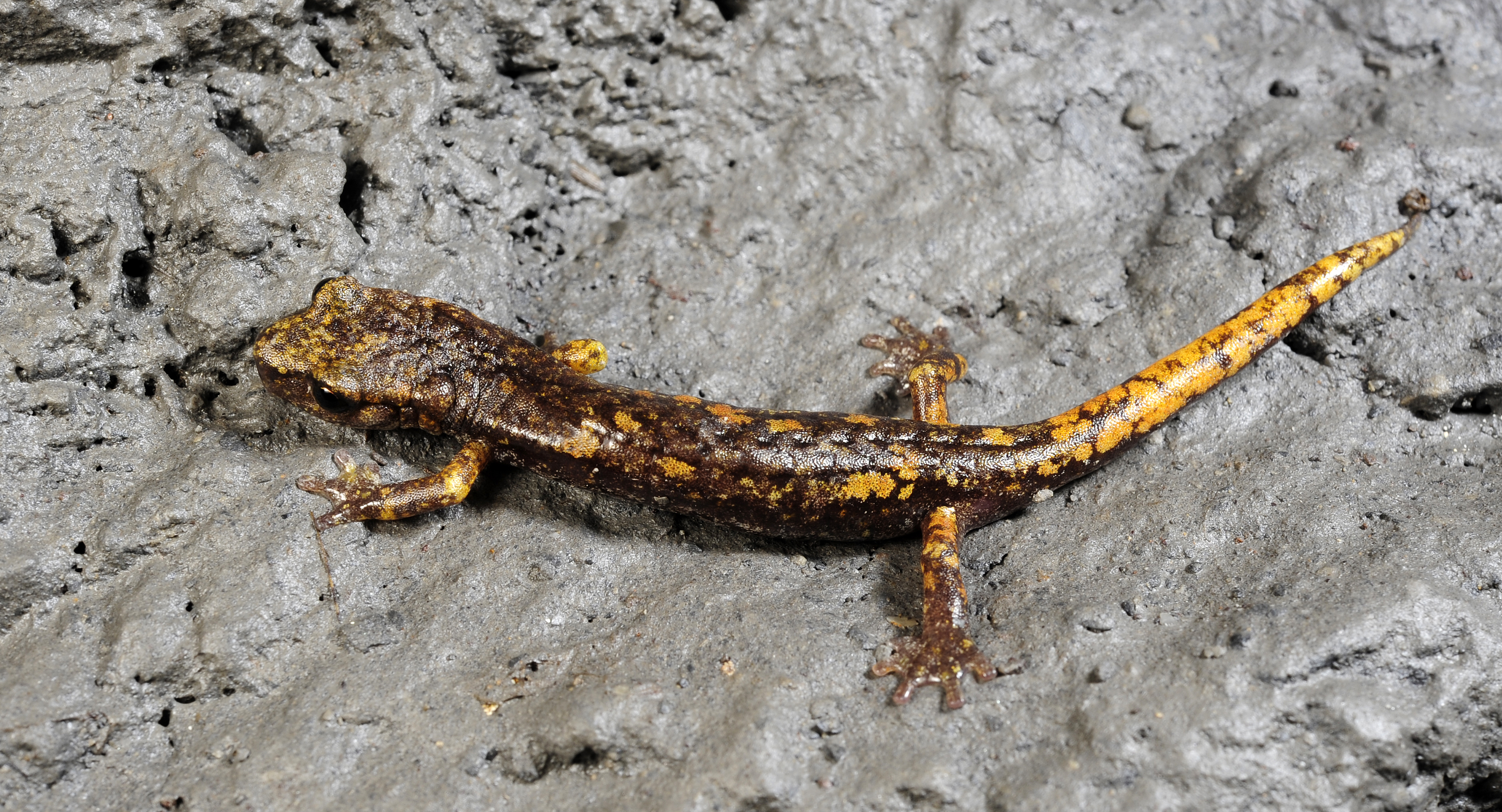
Speleomantes strinatii

== Demography ==
The main urbanized areas of the massif, on its French part, are made up of rural communes, of the "rural town" type (French: bourgs ruraux), or belonging to "rural zones with dispersed or very dispersed housing" type (French: zones rurales à habitat dispersé ou très dispersé), as defined by the municipal density grid of INSEE. Within the massif, the following towns and villages are present:

- to the west: Entraunes, Saint-Martin-d'Entraunes, Châteauneuf-d'Entraunes, Péone, Beuil, Guillaumes, Daluis, Pierlas, Rigaud, Lieuche, Thiéry, Touët-sur-Var, Puget-Théniers;
- in the centre: Saint-Dalmas-le-Selvage, Saint-Étienne-de-Tinée, Isola, Saint-Sauveur-sur-Tinée, Roubion, Roure, Rimplas, Ilonse, Valdeblore, Clans, Bairols, Tournefort, Marie, La Tour, Venanson, Lantosque, Roquebillière, Belvédère, La Bollène-Vésubie, Saint-Martin-Vésubie;
- to the east: Aisone, Roaschia, Valdieri, Entracque, Vinadio, Vernante, Breil-sur-Roya, Fontan, Saorge, Tende, Limone Piemonte.

The central area of the massif is covered by the intercommunal structure constituted by the Nice Côte d'Azur metropolis. Urbanization in the area has been governed by the metropolitan local urban development plan (PLUM, French: Plan local d'urbanisme métropolitain) since 25 October 2019, which incorporates the charter of the Mercantour National Park. The population density on the French part of the massif is low: around 10 inhabitants per km^{2} (as of 2015). The development of this territory is in fact constrained by a very rugged terrain, and it only includes few industrial or agricultural areas. Transport infrastructure is also poorly developed.

The towns and villages of the massif have been subject to a rural exodus since the beginning of the 20th century, which still continues at the beginning of the 21st century, in particular on the Italian part of the massif. However, on the French side, certain villages have seen their population increase again since the beginning of the 21st century (for example in Clans, Saint-Martin-Vésubie, Valdeblore, Belvédère, Lantosque, Saint-Étienne-de-Tinée or Entraunes).

On the French part of the massif, the "membership area" (peripheral zone) of the Mercantour national park covers 23 municipalities, representing 20,600 inhabitants (as of 2022). On the Italian part of the massif, the 5 municipalities of the Maritime Alps natural park (Aisone, Entracque, Roaschia, Valdieri and Vernante) represent just over 3,000 inhabitants (as of 2011).

== History ==
=== Prehistory ===
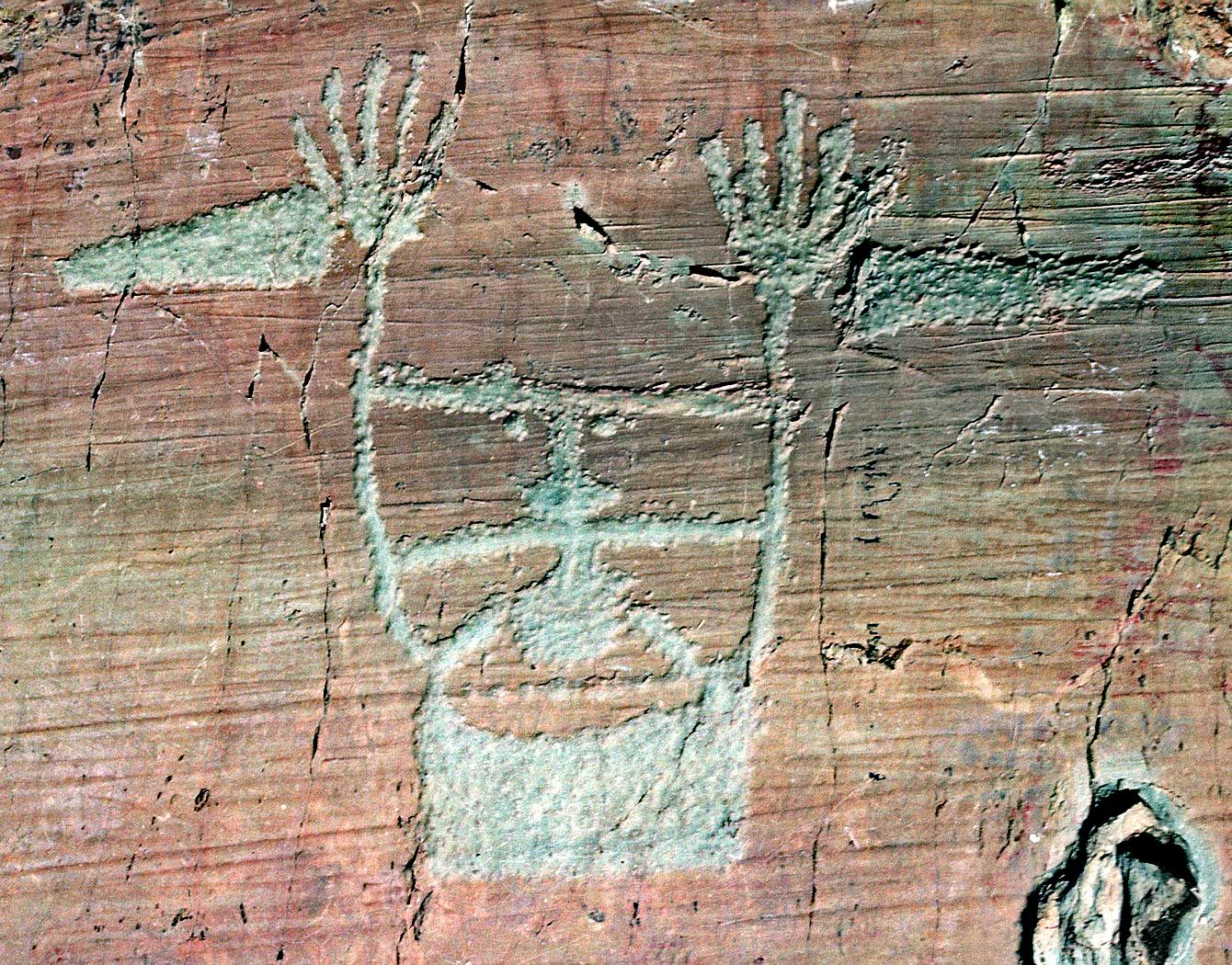
"Sorcier" (transl. Sorcerer), a rock engraving from Vallée des Merveilles

The occupation of the massif by man began in the Neolithic age, and the colonization of the Alpine valleys dates back to the 5th millennium BC. Then came the organization of transhumance and the exploitation of pastures, activities attested from the Copper Age. Rock engravings are present in Vallée des Merveilles, located between 2,000 and 2,600 m above sea level. They are dated to the Copper Age and the Bronze Age. These engravings reflect religious and agricultural interests, as well as efforts to track the passage of time. During the Bronze Age, metallurgical activity developed and semi-nomadism continued: shepherds' shelters were identified in this area as seasonal places of passage. However, the development of human activities at altitude experienced a sharp slowdown between 1550 and 1050 BC, due to the cooling of the climate in the Alpine arch. On the other hand, traces of relationships between protohistoric communities are visible, including at long distances, through certain imported weapons (Carpathian spear found in Cuneo for example). Archaeological documentation increases from the Late Bronze Age onwards, and indicates a stabilization of settlement areas. Traces of a continuous human presence are visible for example in Valdieri, where a necropolis frequented during the recent and final Bronze Age has been identified. At the beginning of the Iron Age, the population of the massif intensified, as did exchanges between communities.

=== Antiquity ===
During Antiquity, the frequentation of the massif and the use of its passes, both by Roman and barbarian peoples, are attested by the discoveries made during archaeological excavations. The passes were used for the movement of people and goods (in particular the Col de Tende). To the east of the massif, a paved Roman road, between Limone Piemonte and the Col de Tende, Roman coins (found on this same pass), ceramics and Roman currency in Tende, and a bronze Roman spoon in the town of La Brigue have been identified among others. The archaeological site of the Tournerie peak is a major Gallic sanctuary frequented between the 5th and 2nd centuries BC. It is located in the town of Roubion. Numerous jewels and pieces of weapons were found there. In Valdeblore, mines and slag deposits have been identified, testifying to ferrous metallurgy on the massif, spread between 2nd century BC and 7th century AD.

The conquest and pacification of the Alpine peoples is due to the Emperor Augustus. An inscription was found at Saint-Dalmas-le-Selvage, which can be translated as: "(the legionary) Fulvius (… ) defeated and subdued the Ligurian (tribes) of Bagienni, Vediantii, Montani and Sallavici". This Alpine conquest is glorified through the Trophy of Augustus, or Trophy of the Alps, located at the foot of the massif, in La Turbie. The list of the 44 Alpine peoples conquered by Rome is engraved on the monument itself, including Celto-Ligurian peoples, present in the region of the massif.

At the end of the 1st century, the western and central parts of the massif were included in the Roman province of the Maritime Alps, and its eastern part was in the 9th Italian region.

=== Middle Ages ===
In the Middle Ages, the dominant monastic power of the massif was the San Dalmazzo da Pedona abbey, created in the 7th century, and ideally located in the town of Borgo San Dalmazzo (formerly Pedona), at the confluence of the 3 Italian valleys of Gesso, Stura and Vermenagna. It dominates the movement of people and goods between the Pô plain and Provence. It also has priories and possessions in neighboring French valleys, notably in Saint-Dalmas-le-Selvage and Saint-Martin-Vésubie.

In the 11th century, the massif was part of the Savoyard state. Subsequently, between the 13th and 14th centuries, the massif was part of the bailiff of the Val de Lantosque, the county of Ventimiglia and the county of Tende. In the 14th century, by deedition of Nice to Savoy, the county of Nice was created, of which the west and centre of the massif are part.

The massif remained an important transit area for shepherds on both sides of the watershed. In the 13th century, there were significant migratory flows related to transhumance, and in the 16th century, shepherds from Vinadio and Sambuco traveled to the pastures of the Vésubie by crossing the mountain passes, and vice versa. These practices united communities, as evidenced by the records of villages on both sides, which contain French names on the Italian side and vice versa.

=== Conquest of the massif ===
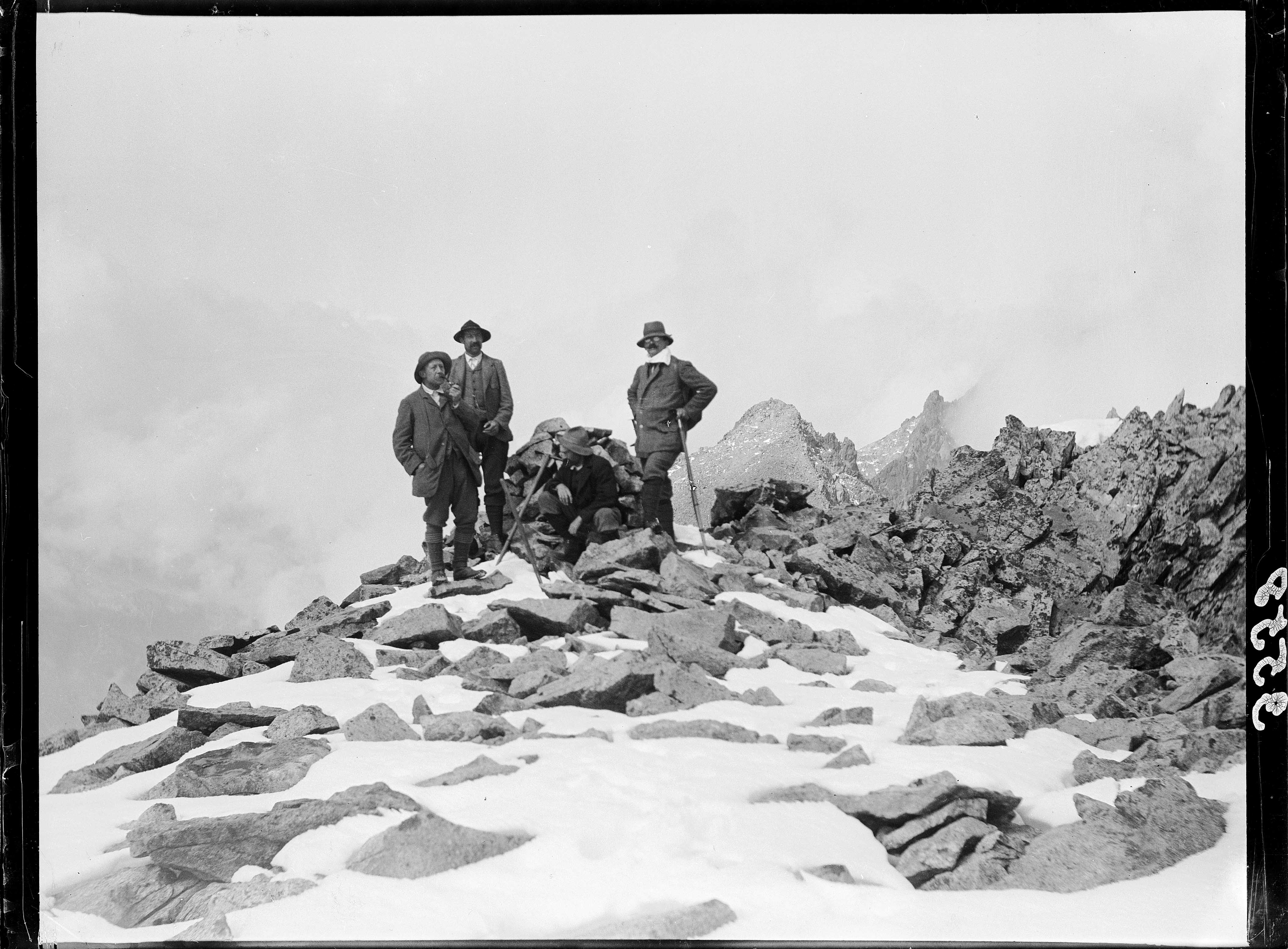
Jean Plent, Louis Maubert and Albert Vérani at the top of Tête de la Ruine, 23 September 1907 (photo by de Cessole)

The first ascent of Mount Argentera was made on 18 August 1879, by William Auguste Coolidge, accompanied by Christian Almer. Between 1889 and 1905, Victor de Cessole organized numerous ascents and their systematic documentation. These expeditions were first carried out in summer, then, from 1896, in winter. The southern summit of Argentera, the highest point of the massif, was reached for the first time on 23 January 1902. Among his most notable climbs are two peaks deemed inaccessible at the time: Corno Stella, reached on 22 August 1903, and the Aiguilles de Pelens, reached in August 1905.

=== Modern era ===
In the immediate post-war period, mountain tourism experienced a significant boom. Historic winter sports resorts like Auron and Valberg experienced increased attendance, and new resorts were created like Isola 2000, in 1971. But this urbanization was not very respectful of the environment: this awareness, in the middle of the 1970s, began the transition towards a more environmentally friendly tourist activity. The Mercantour national park, in France, was created on 8 August 1979 and its Italian equivalent, the Maritime Alps natural park was created in 1995. In May 1986, the Southern Alps, and the massif in particular, was exposed to radioactive fallout from the cloud of particles coming from the Chernobyl disaster. The health and environmental impact of this pollution, mainly due to caesium-137, was studied and debated over between 2000 and 2010. The environmental issue and the role of parks remained a subject of importance in the following decades, as evidenced by the debate around the controversial "Balcons du Mercantour" project and their subsequent abandonment on 23 January 2009. In 2019, an attempt to register the "Mediterranean Alps" (of which the massif is part) as a UNESCO world heritage site ended in failure. Climatic considerations and their influences in the massif subsequently take on importance: On 2 October 2020, storm Alex caused a heavy human and material toll in the Vésubie and Roya valleys. This episode was followed by an exceptional drought a few months later, with consequences on the hydrology of the massif.

== Activities ==
=== Winter sports resorts ===
The winter sports resorts of the massif welcome several million visitors each year, both local and international, and offer several hundred kilometres of alpine ski slopes. They have Nordic areas for cross-country skiing or snowshoeing. At the beginning of the 21st century, since snow in the Southern Alps started experiencing regular deficits, most of these resorts, both in France and in Italy, use artificial snow devices such as snow cannons. There are 10 stations in the massif:

Winter sports resorts in the massif
Resorts in France	Resorts in Italy
Auron	Argentera
Beuil	Entracque
Isola 2000	Limone Piemonte
La Colmiane	Bagni di Vinadio
Valberg	
Le Sauze	

=== Hiking ===
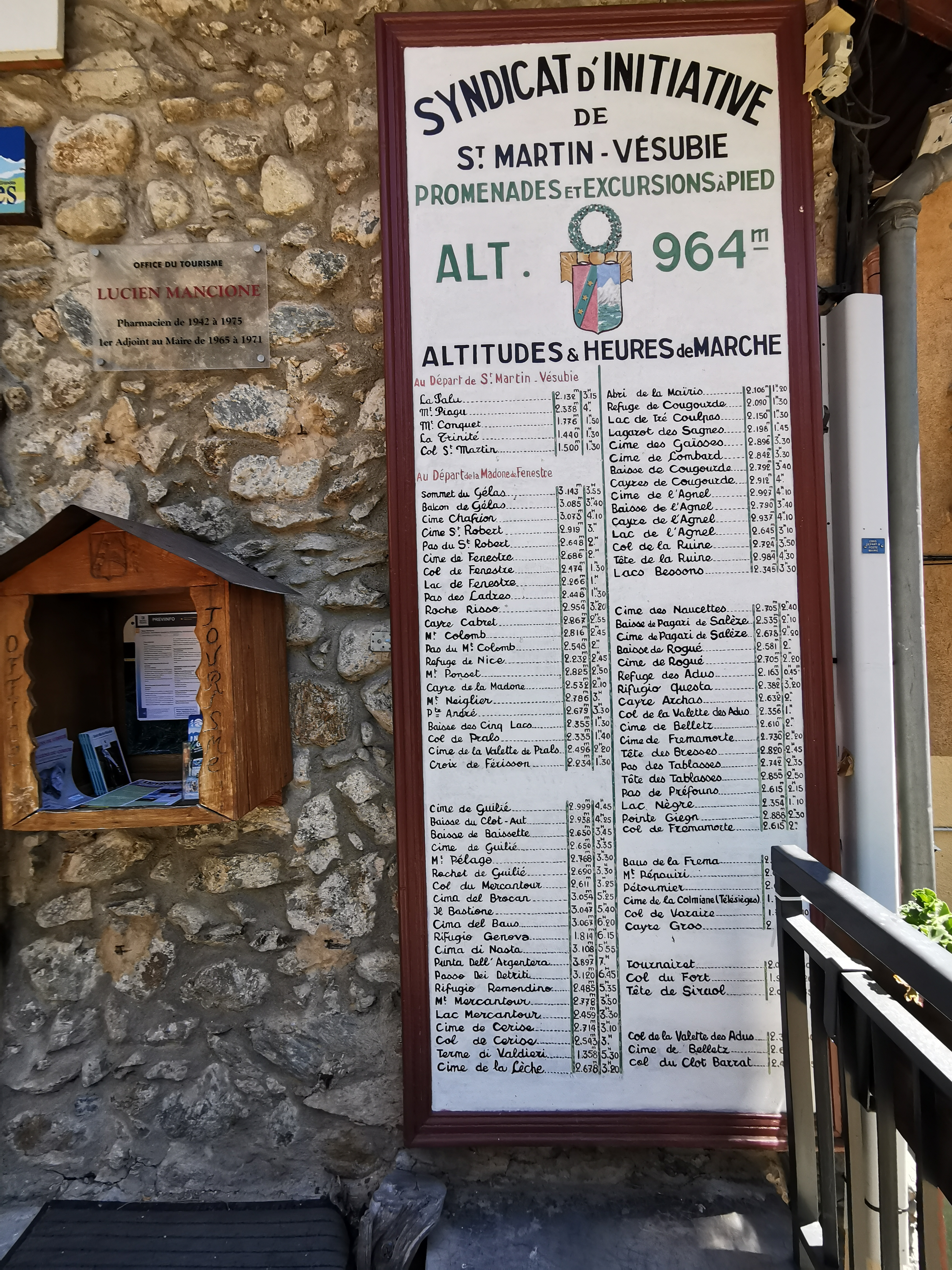
Altitudes and hiking times, at the Saint-Martin-Vésubie tourist office.

The massif welcomes several hundred thousand hikers each year. The Mercantour National Park, located within the massif, maintains 1,700 km of hiking trails, with 550 km in the central zone of the park. On the Italian side, the Maritime Alps Natural Park offers 400 km of hiking trails. The massif is traversed by the GR 5 and GR 52 trails. The Grande Traversée des Alpes (GTA) is a segment of the GR 5 on the French side, with its Italian counterpart being the Grande Traversata delle Alpi. The "blue" and "red" routes of the Via Alpina also cross the massif. Various hiking routes are available, ranging from day hikes to longer treks like the Grande traversée du Mercantour (GTM), which takes over two weeks.

=== Mountaineering ===
Many rock or mixed climbing routes exist in the massif. The relatively modest altitude of the peaks and the presence of numerous refuges most of the time allow these routes to be undertaken as a day trip. On the French part of the massif alone, in an area located between Mont Malinvern and Mont Bégo, nearly 1,100 different races are listed. Added to these, among others, are the hundreds of races offered by the Argentera range, on the Italian part of the massif.

The routes are a mixture of historic routes, opened by pioneers in the exploration of this territory, such as Victor de Cessole, and large-scale routes, opened by great names in mountaineering, such as Jean Vernet, Patrick Berhault and Alessandro Gogna, and more modern and often technical routes, some of which opened in the 2010s.

=== Cycling ===
The Tour de France has regularly used the passes of the massif since 1950, and the Mercan'Tour Classic is a road cycling race organized since 2020 around Valberg. Until 2015, the Prom' Gélas race took place within the massif, combining road cycling from the seaside with ski mountaineering up to Cime du Gélas. Within the massif, it is also possible to go mountain biking off-season in several winter sports resorts. However, mountain biking in the protected areas of the Mercantour and Alpes Maritimes parks is generally heavily regulated.

== In popular culture ==
=== Paintings ===
The Mercantour-Argentera massif has inspired several painters over the centuries. In the 19th century, Claude Monet produced various oils on canvas representing the massif seen from Antibes and Cyrille Besset produced paintings of Saint-Martin-Vésubie and Roya in the village of Fontan. Different watercolorists also represented the places: Alexis Mossa with works of Boréon, Haut-Boréon, as well as Gordolasque, and Antoine Trachel with representations of Tende and Roquebillière. By the end of the 19th century and the beginning of the 20th century, Pierre Comba, in several of his watercolors, depicted battalions of Alpine hunters evolving within the massif. Alban Larousse and Michel Rohmer in the 20th century then Alexis Nouailhat, in the 21st century produced numerous watercolors representing the massif, as well as its fauna and flora.

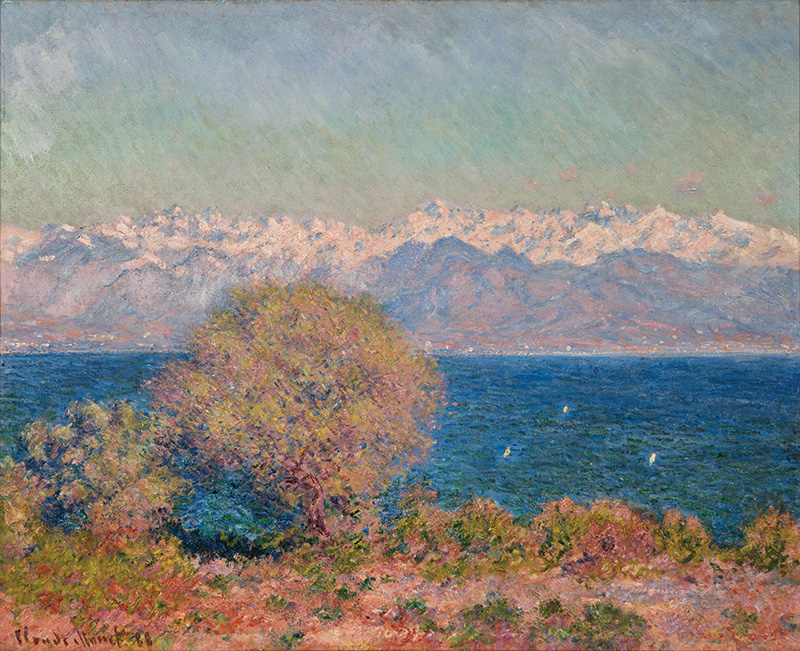
View of the massif, from Cap d'Antibes, Claude Monet, 1888.

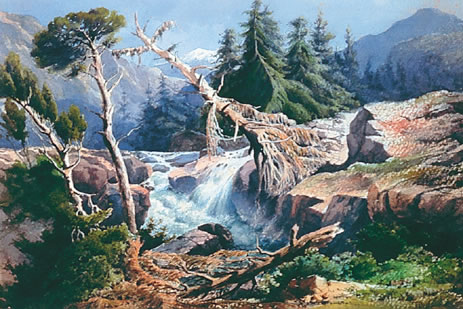
Le Boréon by Albert Thiole, 1894.

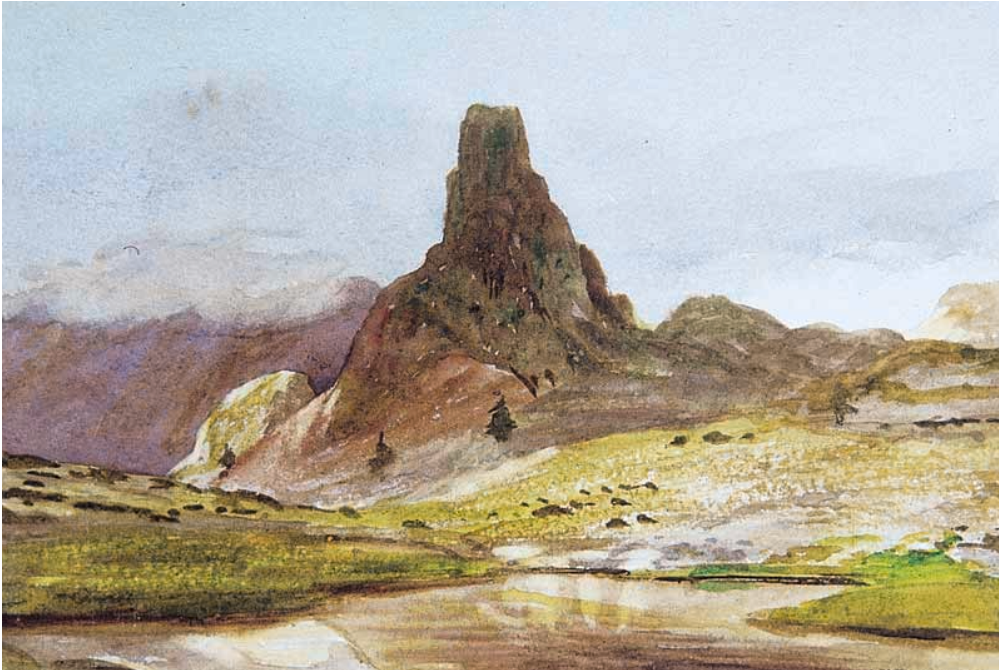
Le Caïre Pounchu vu depuis Camp Soubran (Boréon) by Alexis Mossa, August 8, 1885.

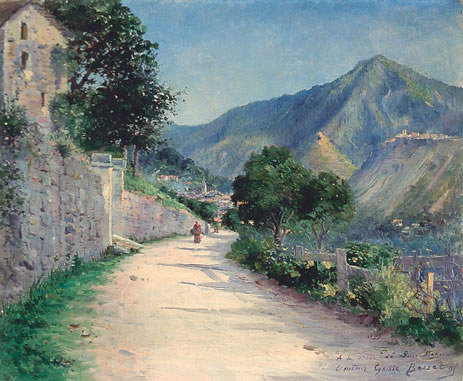
Le village de Saint-Martin-Vésubie by Cyrille Besset, 1895.

=== Cinema and television ===
In the Gordolasque, the upper valley served as the setting for the series Belle et Sébastien, and the film Sauvage, by Jean-François Amiguet. The village of Belvédère, for its part, served as the setting for the first scenes of the film Le Gendarme de Saint-Tropez, with Louis de Funès.

The Vésubie valley also appears in the film Le Cas du Docteur Laurent, with Jean Gabin, filmed in the villages of Saint-Martin-Vésubie and Venanson. Higher in the valley, the diffusion of 26 September 1965 of the program En vue direct de…, produced by Jacques Ertaud, took place on the west face of Cougourde, with the mountaineers Jean Grinda, Jean-Marie Morisset, Gaston Rébuffat and Maurice Baquet.

In the Roya valley, the film La Fille sur le pont, with Daniel Auteuil and Vanessa Paradis, was directed by Patrice Leconte partly in the area of the village of Breil-sur-Roya.

And more generally in the massif: Minuscule: Valley of the Lost Ants is an animated film with live-action settings using the landscapes of the Mercantour park. La montagne aux histoires is a film based on exchanges with inhabitants of the valleys of the massif, produced on the occasion of the 40th anniversary of the Mercantour park.

In the documentary category, Naïs au pays des loups was filmed by a father and his daughter over three years, going to meet a wolf in the heart of the Mercantour park, and Face au vide, produced in 2020, highlights amateur mountaineering, and is partly carried out within the massif.

On television, L'Homme à l'envers is an adaptation of the eponymous novel by Fred Vargas, set in the massif, and the show Des racines et des ailesdevotes episodes 19 of its season 16 and 9 of its season 25 partly to the massif and its communes.

=== Music ===
"Les Follies des Lacs" is an annual music festival, created in 2001 by the mayor of Valdeblore, in which pianist François-René Duchâble regularly participates, taking place at the edge of the lakes of the massif. Julien Doré composed his album & in a chalet in Saint-Martin-Vésubie, and recorded an acoustic version of Coco câline in the mountains of the massif.

=== Literature ===
Nice et Savoie, work commissioned by Napoleon III and published in 1864, contains lithographs representing the departments newly attached to France in 1860, and more particularly from different villages of the massif. La Suisse niçoise, a collection of the writings of Victor de Cessole and Fernand Noetinger, traces the history of the conquest of the massif. Jean Siccardi, a writer from Nice, depicts two shepherd brothers in the heart of the massif, in his book Les brumes du Mercantour. Alain Grinda's novel Madonna de Fenestre takes place partly within the massif, in the area of the sanctuary of the Madonna de Fenestre. In the category of novels, Étoile errante, a work by J. M. G. Le Clézio, takes place partly in Saint-Martin-Vésubie. Mercantour, l'esprit des lieux by Olivier Lemire offers a photographic journey within the massif.
