= Cime de la Malédie =

Mountain in Maritime Alps

- Location within Provence-Alpes-Côte d'Azur Location within France Location within Piedmont Location within Italy

Highest point
- Prominence: 132 m (433 ft)
- Isolation: 1.12 km (0.70 mi)
- Coordinates: 44°07′20″N 7°23′54″E

Naming
- Native name: Cime de la Malédie (French); Cima Maledia (Italian)

Geography
- Parent range: Mercantour-Argentera massif

Geology
- Rock type: Anatexites

Cime de la Malédie (Italian: Cima Maledia) is a mountain in the Maritime Alps, on the France–Italy border. Its French part is located in the upper Gordolasque valley, in the commune of Belvédère, in the department of Alpes-Maritimes.

== Geography ==
Maledia Peak is a mountain located in the upper Gesso valley near Entracque, in the Maritime Alps of northwestern Italy. It lies on the main Alpine watershed, which in this area generally runs east–west, with several directional deviations. From Finestra Peak in the west, the ridge extends east-northeast over Mount Gelàs to Borello Peak, then shifts southeast to reach the summit of Maledia. From this point, the ridge, known as Serra Pagarì, continues southeast to the Pagarì peak (2,819 m), where it turns eastward toward Pagarì Peak and Peirabroc Peak. It then veers southeast again toward the West Clapier Pass and Mount Clapier. Northwest of Maledia's summit, at approximately 2,928 metres, a secondary ridge branches off in a northeast direction toward the Muraion cairn. There, it divides into two ridges forming a cirque that opens to the northeast, containing the Muraion Glacier.

Two additional glaciers originate on the slopes of Maledia. The Maledia Glacier lies northeast of the summit, in the dihedral formed by the secondary and main ridges extending toward Borello Peak. The Pagarì Glacier is situated in a glacial cirque southeast of the summit and descends into the basin that hosts the Pagarì Hut. On historical maps by the Italian Geographic Military Institute (IGM), this glacier is also labeled as the Maledia Glacier.

Just northwest of the summit lies Maledia Lake, also known locally as Lagarot. This lake is situated along the standard ascent route to the peak.

Geologically, Maledia belongs to the Argentera crystalline massif. The mountain is primarily composed of biotite granitoid gneisses, which in some areas transition to microcrystalline granite.

== History ==
The normal route was opened by Élisa and Louis Maubert, accompanied by guides Jean and Jean-Baptiste Plent, on July 23, 1895. The first winter ascent of the same route was carried out by Victor de Cessole, accompanied by B. Daniel and J. Plent, on March 16, 1904.

The name Maledia is traditionally interpreted to mean "cursed peak," originating from a local legend. According to the tale, the mountain was once forested and fertile, inhabited by three sisters—Laura, Bice, and Lia. When one sister rebuffed the advances of the lord of Entracque, he banished them. Before leaving, the sisters cursed the mountain, which then became snowbound, losing its forests and becoming barren. Some historians suggest that the name may have been imposed during the medieval period by ecclesiastical authorities to discourage visits to locations associated with ancient, pre-Christian religious practices.

== Ascension to the summit ==
The standard route to the summit of Maledia follows the northwest slope, beginning at Maledia Lake (2,910 m). Although the lake is accessible via multiple approaches, all involve mountaineering difficulties and require proper equipment and experience.

The classic ascent from the Italian side originates at the Rifugio Pagarì and ascends to the lake via the Maledia Gully. This gully, a dihedral formed between the Pagarì cirque and the Muraion ridge, can be climbed directly when snow conditions are favorable—either with consistent snow coverage or in its complete absence. In mixed conditions, ascent is typically made via ledges located along the sides of the couloir. These routes are generally rated F+ in difficulty, with rock sections reaching grades of II+ to III– on the UIAA scale.

An alternative approach to the lake is possible from the French side. This route begins at the Pas du Lac Long and traverses at altitude above Lac Long, eventually reaching a small gully that ascends to the lake. This approach can also be accessed from the Italian side via the Pagarì Pass and is rated EE (Escursionisti Esperti – for experienced hikers).

From Maledia Lake, the ascent continues across a snowfield, followed by a climb through one of three rocky gullies that lead to a scree slope below the summit. The rock passages within these gullies reach a maximum difficulty of II+.

Accommodation and support for the ascent are available from the Rifugio Pagarì on the Italian side and the Refuge de Nice on the French side.

== Bibliography ==
- Bogdanoff, S. (2003). "Geology of the Maritime Alps: The Argentera Massif". Journal of Alpine Geology. 45: 23–45.
- Rocca, G. (1998). Leggende e tradizioni delle Alpi Marittime [Legends and Traditions of the Maritime Alps]. Cuneo: Edizioni Primalpe. pp. 56–60. ISBN 978-88-867-9403-9.
