= Agnel =

Agnel is both a surname and a given name. Notable people with the name include:

- Romana Agnel (born 1965), Polish dancer, choreographer and art historian.
- Yannick Agnel (born 1992), French swimmer

== See also ==
- Cime de l'Agnel, a mountain in the Mercantour
- Lake of the Agnel, a lake in the Mercantour
- Agnel (coin), medieval French coin
