= Monte Clapier =

Mountain in Italy

Monte Clapier Mont Clapier
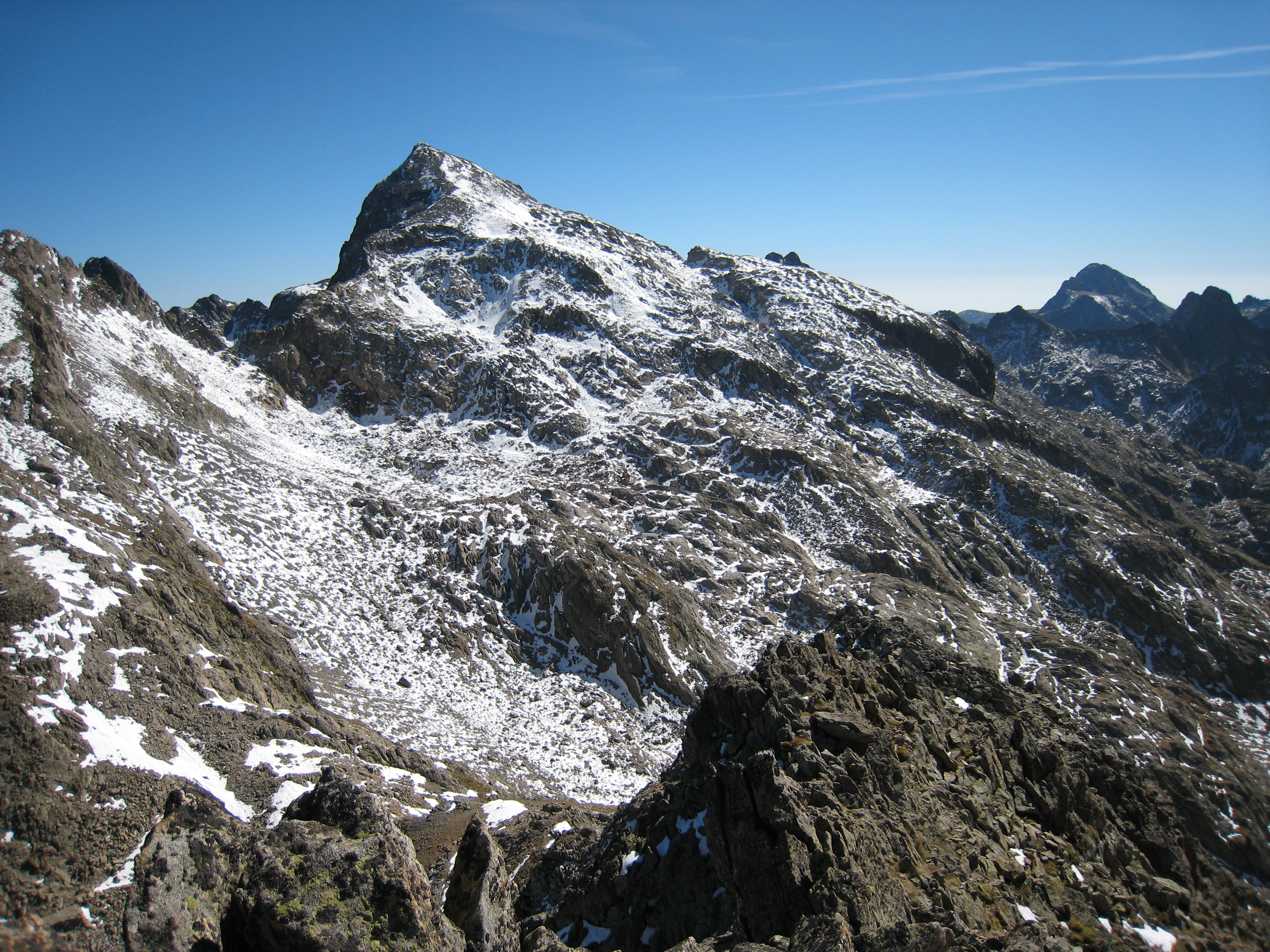

Highest point
- Elevation: 3,045 m (9,990 ft)
- Prominence: 219 m (719 ft)
- Isolation: 1.96 km (1.22 mi)
- Coordinates: 44°06′58″N 7°25′09″E

Geography
- Location within Alps
- Location: Piedmont, Italy; Provence-Alpes-Côte d'Azur, France
- Parent range: Maritime Alps

Climbing
- First ascent: 1832, Luigi Giovanni Fecia Cossato, approaching from Entracque

Monte Clapier (French: Mont Clapier) is a mountain in the Maritime Alps, on the boundary between the province of Cuneo (Piedmont, northern Italy) and the French region of Provence-Alpes-Côte-d'Azur.

== Geography ==
It is part of the Mercantour massif.

Monte Clapier is home to the southernmost glacier in the Alps, located on the Italian side at some 40 km from the sea. Furthermore, it is the southernmost mountain in the Alps exceeding 3000 meters in height.

== Geology ==
Geologically, the mountain is formed by granitoid gneiss, with outcrops of amphibolic agmatites (granitoid migmatites).

== Climbing ==
It may be climbed from the Refuge Nice in around two-and-a-half to three hours, initially northward along a narrow path towards the Lacs de Mont Clapier, then eastward along a cairned route (no path visible) across rough, bouldered ground.

== View ==
The view is extensive stretching from the Mediterranean to the south to the high Alps to the northeast. Monte Viso is prominent to the north and 4000m peaks like the Matterhorn, Monte Rosa and the Weissmies, and even Corsica, are visible on clear days.

== See also ==
- Col de Clapier
- Valle Gesso

== Maps ==
- Italian official cartography (Istituto Geografico Militare - IGM); on-line version: www.pcn.minambiente.it
- French official cartography (Institut Géographique National - IGN); on-line version: www.geoportail.fr

== Bibliography ==
- Villani, Nanni (April 2002). Monte Argentera, tre metri sotto i tremila e trecento, in Piemonte Parchi - speciale Cime Tempestose. Regione Piemonte.
