= Lakes of Vens =

Lakes in the French Alps

- Lacs de Vens (French)
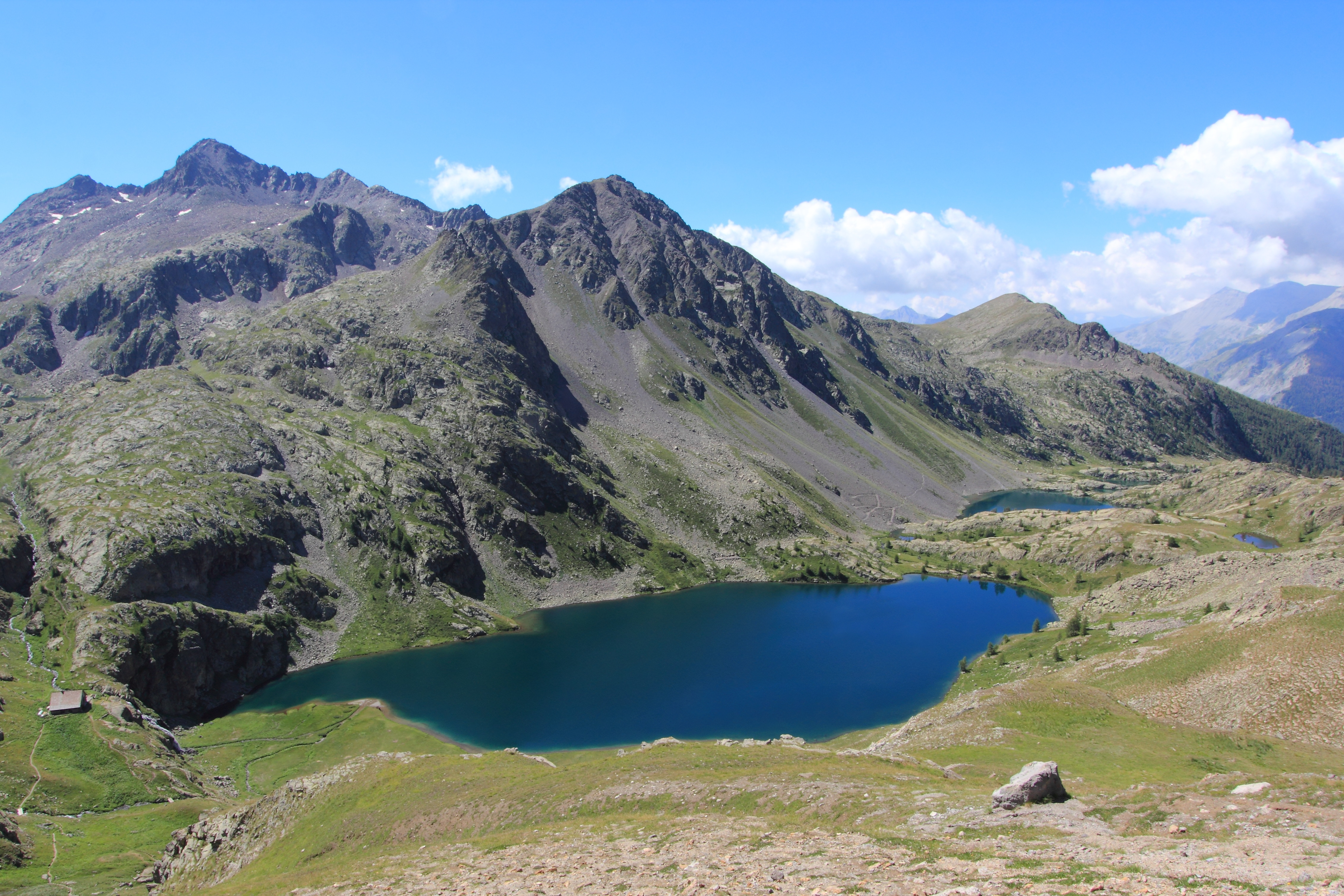
- A view on the Lakes of Vens (Tinée, French Alps). The refuge of Vens can be seen on the left.

- Location within Alps
- Location: Alpes-Maritimes, Alps
- Coordinates: 44°18′55″N 6°56′16″E
- Basin countries: France
- Surface elevation: 2,325 m (7,628 ft)

The lakes of Vens (French: Lacs de Vens) are located in the massif of the Mercantour, between the elevations of 2,325 m (7,628 ft) and 2,278 m (7,474 ft), in the township of Saint-Étienne-de-Tinée, in the department of the Alpes-Maritimes.

== Geography ==
The lakes of Vens consist of a succession of five main lakes. The largest, overlooked by the refuge of Vens, has a depth of 31 m (102 ft).

== Itinerary ==
The lakes of Vens are accessible to the hikers from the hamlet of the Pra on the route of the col de la Bonette or from Saint-Étienne-de-Tinée.
