= Testa Malinvern =

Mountain on the Italy–France border

- Mont Malinvern
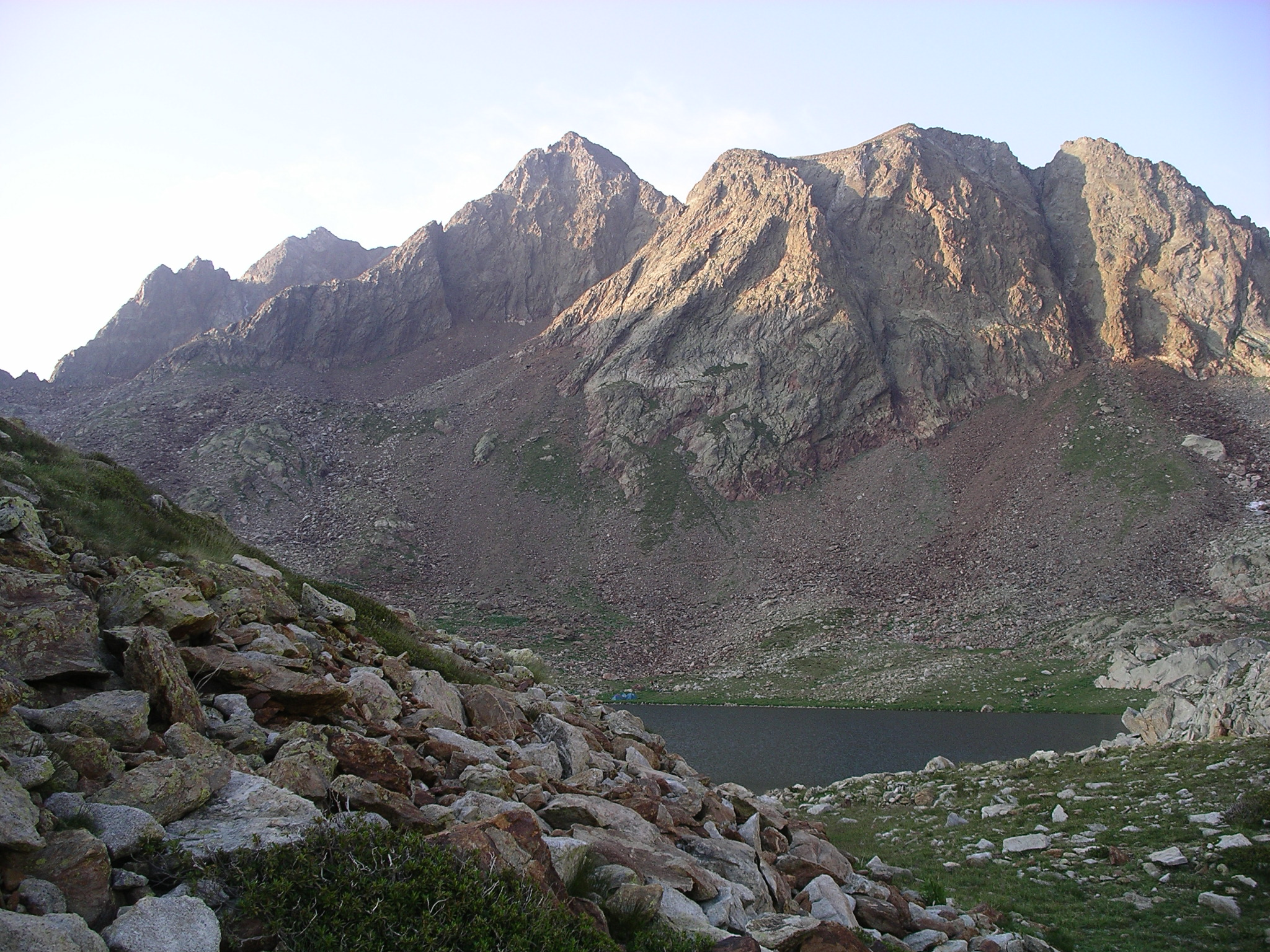
- Testa Malinvern seen from the Laghi di Terre Rouge

Highest point
- Prominence: 387 m (1,270 ft)
- Coordinates: 44.200223°N 7.188599°E

Geography
- Region(s): Piedmont; Provence-Alpes-Côte d'Azur
- Parent range: Maritime Alps

Climbing
- First ascent: 1878

The Testa Malinvern (also called Monte Malinvern, Mont Malinvern in French) is a mountain in the Maritime Alps with an elevation of 2,939 m (9,642 ft) above sea level.

== Characteristics ==
It is located along the border line between Italy (Piedmont) and France (Provence-Alpes-Côte d'Azur). On the Italian side, the summit lies on the border between the municipalities of Vinadio and Valdieri, while on the French side, it is in the municipality of Isola.

The border ridge runs in a SSE-NNW direction up to the summit, where it turns southwest toward Testa Comba Grossa, then turns again northwest. A secondary ridge branches off from the summit and heads east, reaching the Colletto di Valscura. The mountain is ideally bounded by the Bassa del Druos pass to the SSE, the Colletto di Valscura to the east, and the Passo del Lupo to the southwest.

The name derives from the Occitan malüvèrn, meaning cold place, with particularly long and harsh winters, referring especially to the meteorological conditions of the Vallone di Riofreddo, which extends north of the mountain. The name is pronounced with the accent on the "è": Malinvèrn.

From a geological perspective, the mountain belongs to the Argentera Crystalline Massif: it is primarily composed of biotitic granitic gneisses, locally transitioning to microgranular granites; there are also outcrops of massive aplitic granites, amphibolic agmatites, and dark ocellar gneisses (especially at the base).

The first ascent is attributed to IGM geographer Lieutenant Siccardi in 1878.

== Access to the summit ==
=== Normal route ===
The normal route to the summit follows the SSE ridge from the Bassa del Druos (2,628 m (8,622 ft)); just below the pass, on the Italian side, a trail cuts through a scree slope and leads to the base of a 50 m (160 ft) gully, which is climbed with easy climbing (grade II). This leads to a rocky basin, which is ascended to the ridge crest, followed by a trail and rocky sections marked with red blazes and cairns, reaching the summit. The difficulty of the route is generally rated as F. At the summit, there is a metal cross engraved with a dove and an olive branch, symbols of peace, installed in 1986 by volunteers from the parish of Bene Vagienna.

The Bassa del Druos can be reached from both the Italian and French sides. From the Italian side, the route starts at Terme di Valdieri, reaches the Rifugio Valasco (1,764 m (5,787 ft)), and ascends to the Laghi di Valscura (2,264 m), from where the pass is directly accessible. Alternatively, one can ascend the Vallone di Riofreddo to the Rifugio Malinvern, then follow trail P13, which passes the Colletto di Valscura and descends to the Laghi di Valscura, joining the trail from Terme di Valdieri. From the French side, the route starts at Isola 2000, passing the Lacs de Terre Rouges and ascending to the pass.

=== Southwest ridge ===
The ascent via the southwest ridge is a more challenging route, with a difficulty rating of PD-. From Isola 2000, one reaches the Lacs de Terres-Rouges, then turns north toward the Passo del Lupo, on the ridge between Malinvern and Comba Grossa. After reaching a small lake at 2,532 m, a trail branches off to the right toward the basin between the two peaks, ascending to the ridge with easy climbing. Once on the ridge, the summit is reached shortly.

=== Support points ===
On the Italian side, one can use the Rifugio Emilio Questa (2,388 m), located below the Testa del Claus, or the Rifugio Malinvern (1,839 m), in the Vallone di Riofreddo. In Isola 2000, there is the Rifugio Chastillon (2,018 m).

== Image gallery ==
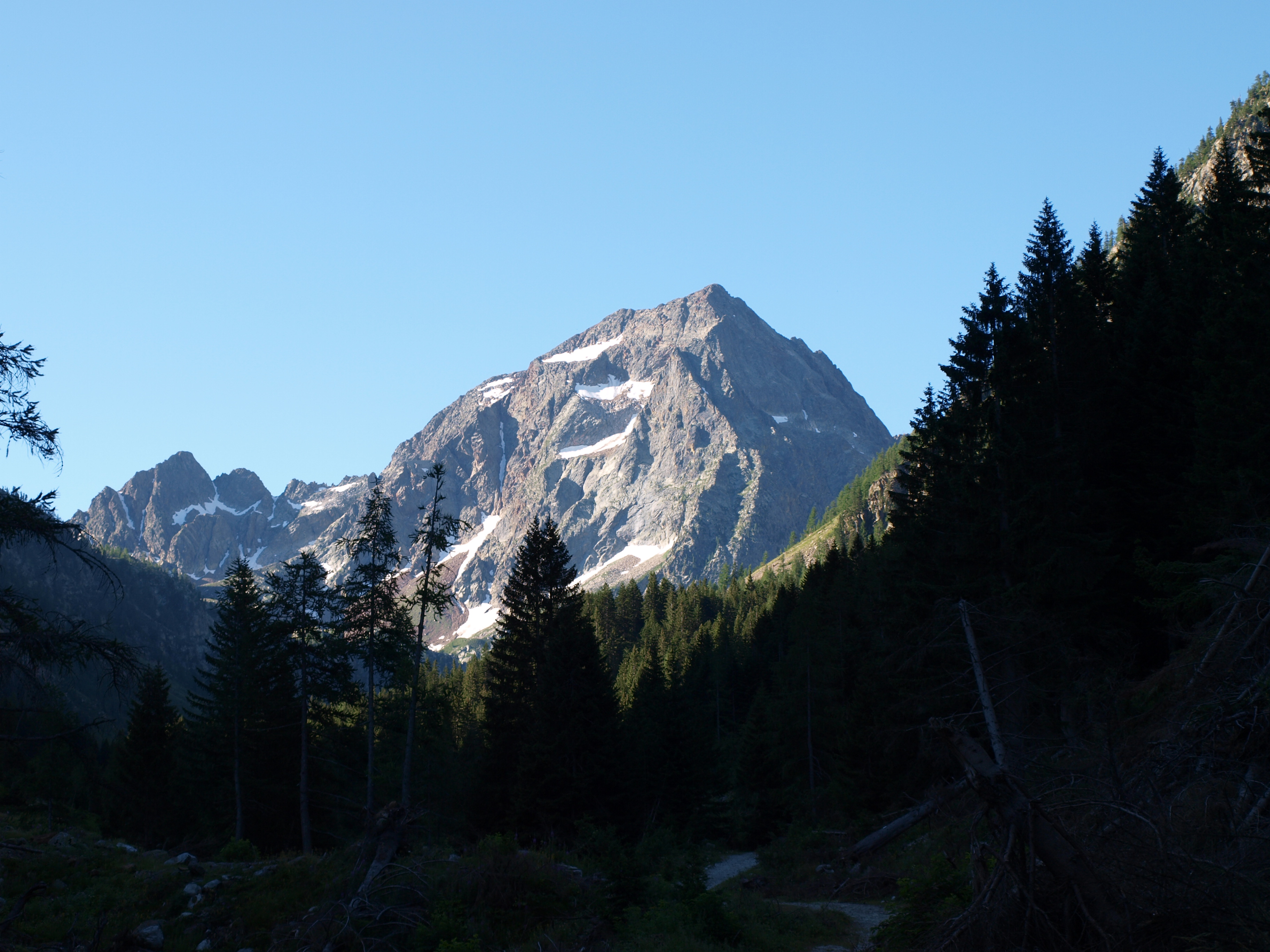
Monte Malinvern from the Vallone di Riofreddo

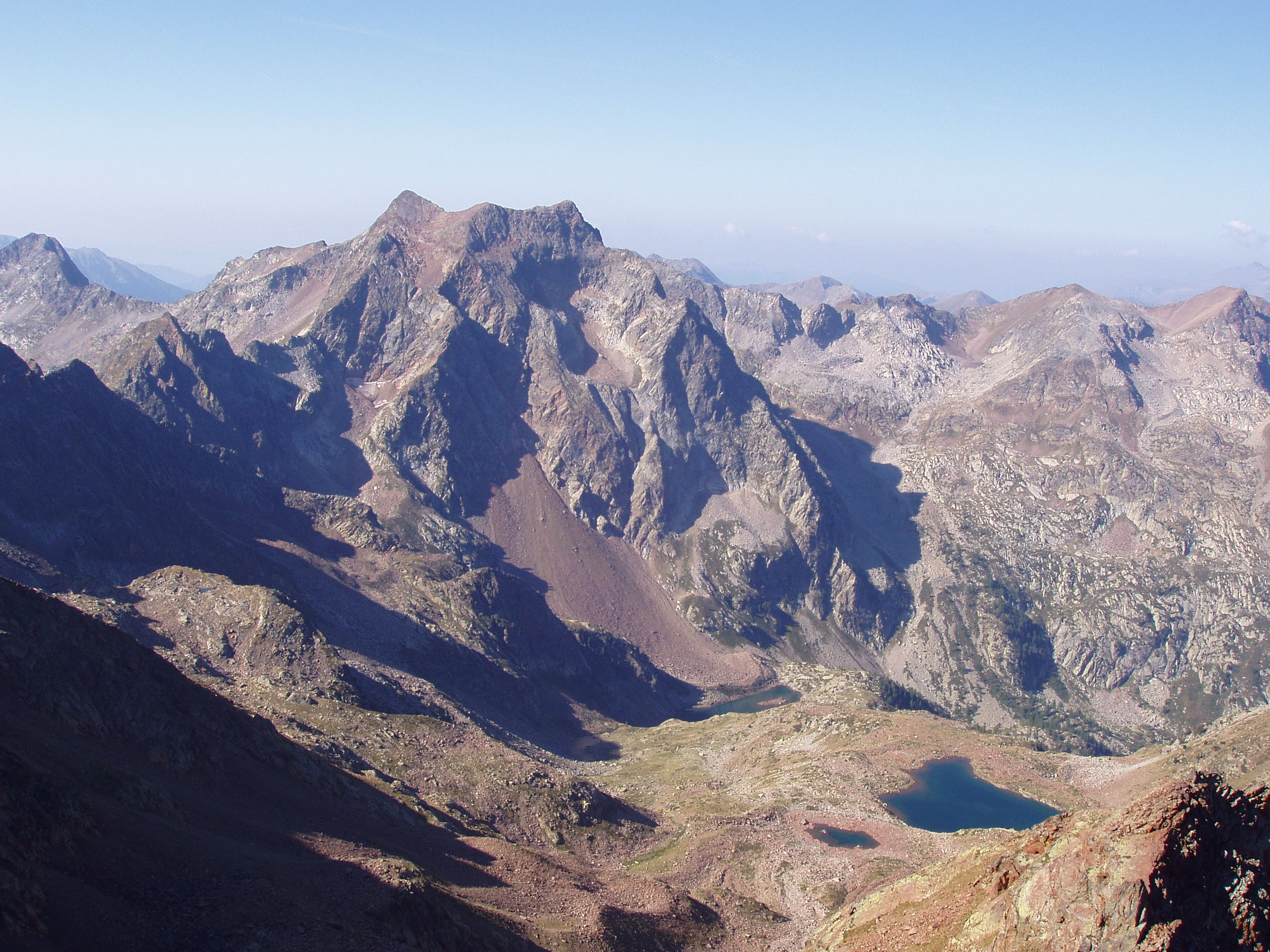
Monte Malinvern with Lago Malinvern and the Laghi della Paur
