= Cime de l'Agnel =

Mountain in Italy

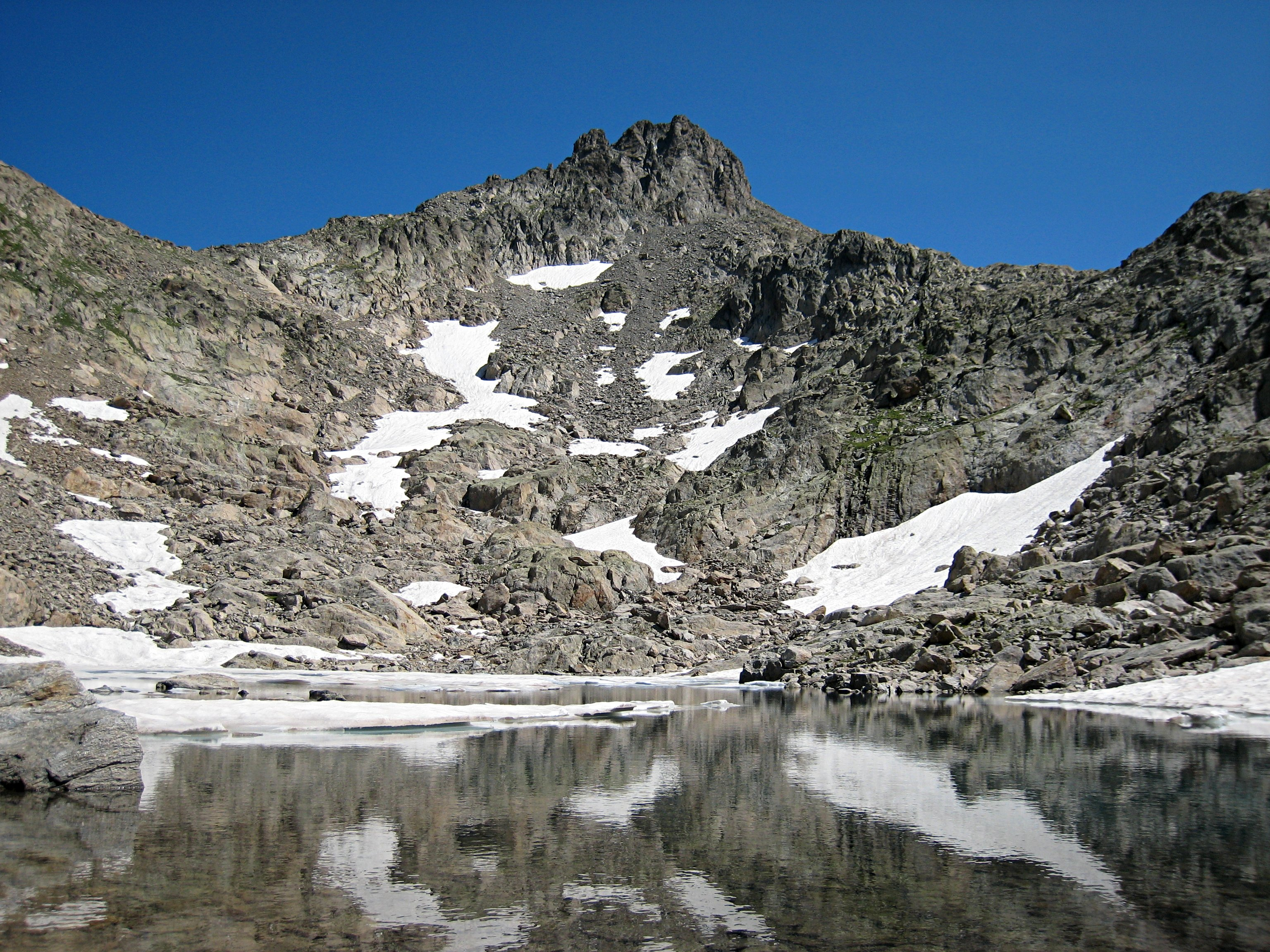
- Cime de l'Agnel and Lake of the Agnel.

Highest point
- Elevation: 2,927 m (9,603 ft)
- Prominence: 137 m (449 ft)
- Coordinates: 44°08′45″N 07°20′26″E

Geography
- Location within France

Cime de l'Agnel is a mountain in France. It is one of the main peaks of the Mercantour-Argentera, upstream of Upper Boréon in the Vésubie, at the border between the Alpes-Maritimes and Piedmont.

It is surrounded by the peaks of the Caïres de Cougourde, the Malaribe and the Caïre de l'Agnel. Its summit is easily reached by hiking from the Cougourde hut (2 hours). It is also a classic peak in winter and spring for backcountry skiers.

On the southwest side of the Agnel peak is the Lake of the Agnel (2645 m). The latter should not be confused with the Lakes of Agnel (2342 m and 2360 m), located on the route of GR5-GR56, close to the Pas de la Cavale in the Salso Moreno Valley, Tinée.
