= Cima del Baus =

Mountain in Italy

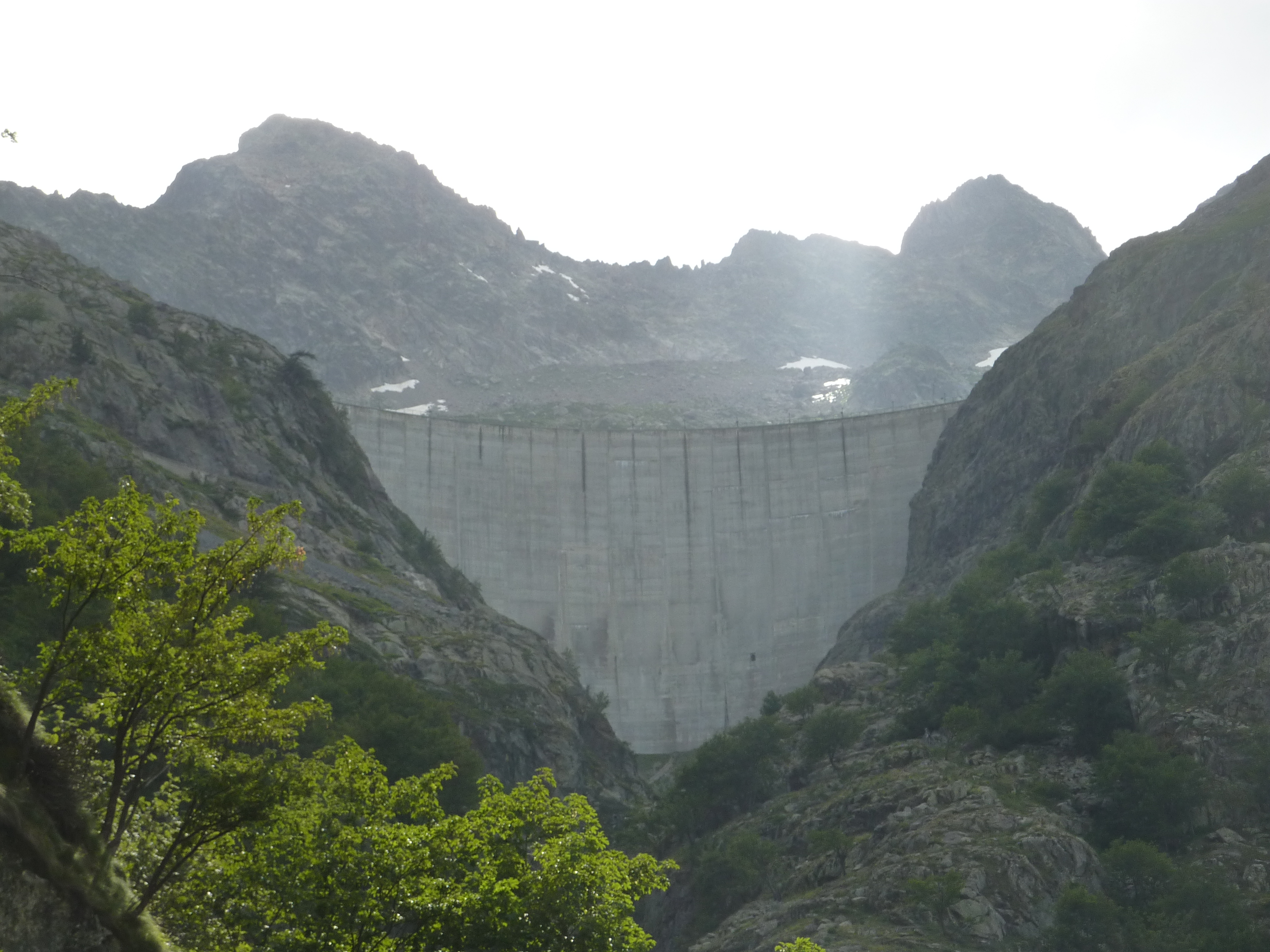
- View of the Chiotas dam in the foreground with, in the background on the right, Baus and on the left, Cima Bastione.

Highest point
- Elevation: 3,067 m (10,062 ft)
- Prominence: 96 m (315 ft)
- Coordinates: 44°09′42″N 7°18′44″E

Geography
- Location within Italy Location within Piedmont
- Country: Italy
- Province: Cuneo
- Region: Piedmont
- Parent range: Massif du Mercantour-Argentera

Cima del Baus (French: Cime de Baus) is a mountain in the Maritime Alps. It is located in the upper Gesso Valley and is part of the Argentera massif. It lies entirely within Italian territory, on the border between the municipalities of Entracque and Valdieri.

== Etymology ==
The name "Baus" derives from a pre-Latin root, meaning "enormous isolated boulder."

== Geography ==
The mountain is situated on a ridge that descends from the main Alpine watershed and extends northward, separating the Gesso della Valletta Valley from the Gesso di Entracque Valley. The mountain has a three-ridge structure:

- The first ridge extends southeast from the summit, then turns south at the Cima Bastione, descending to the Brocan Pass before rising again towards the Cima Brocan.
- The second ridge extends northeast towards the nearby Cima di Nasta.
- The third ridge descends eastward, then east-northeast, sloping down towards the Chiotas Lake.

=== Geology ===
Geologically, Baus is primarily composed of gneiss and granite, which are part of the Argentera crystalline complex.
