= Cima Genova =

Mountain in Italy

- Location within Piedmont Location within Italy

Highest point
- Elevation: 3,191 m (10,469 ft)
- Coordinates: 44°10′30″N 7°18′20″E

Geography
- Country: Italy
- Province: Cuneo
- Region: Piedmont
- Parent range: Maritime Alps

Geology
- Rock type: Gneiss

Cima Genova (French: Cime Genova) is a mountain in the Maritime Alps in the upper Gesso valley, in the Italian province of Cuneo.

== Geography ==
Cime Genova is located near the southern summit of Monte Argentera, on the north-south oriented ridge line which connects Monte Argentera in Italy to Cime Guilié in France. This ridge line separates the municipalities of Valdieri to the west, and Entracque to the east. Geologically, it is mainly made up of gneiss.
