= Valle Stura di Demonte =

Stura di Demonte Valley
- Valle Stura di Demonte
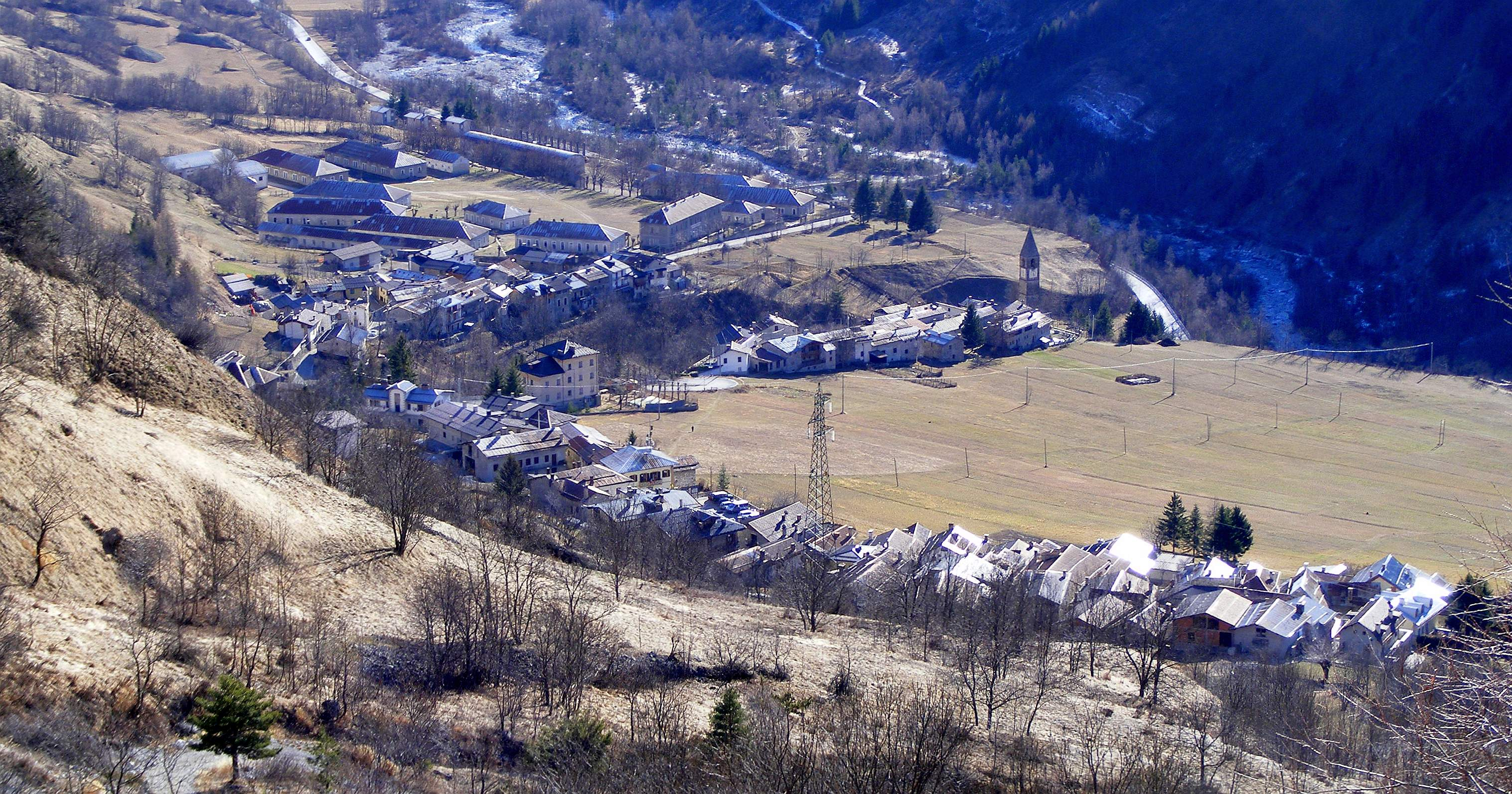
- The valley around Sambuco

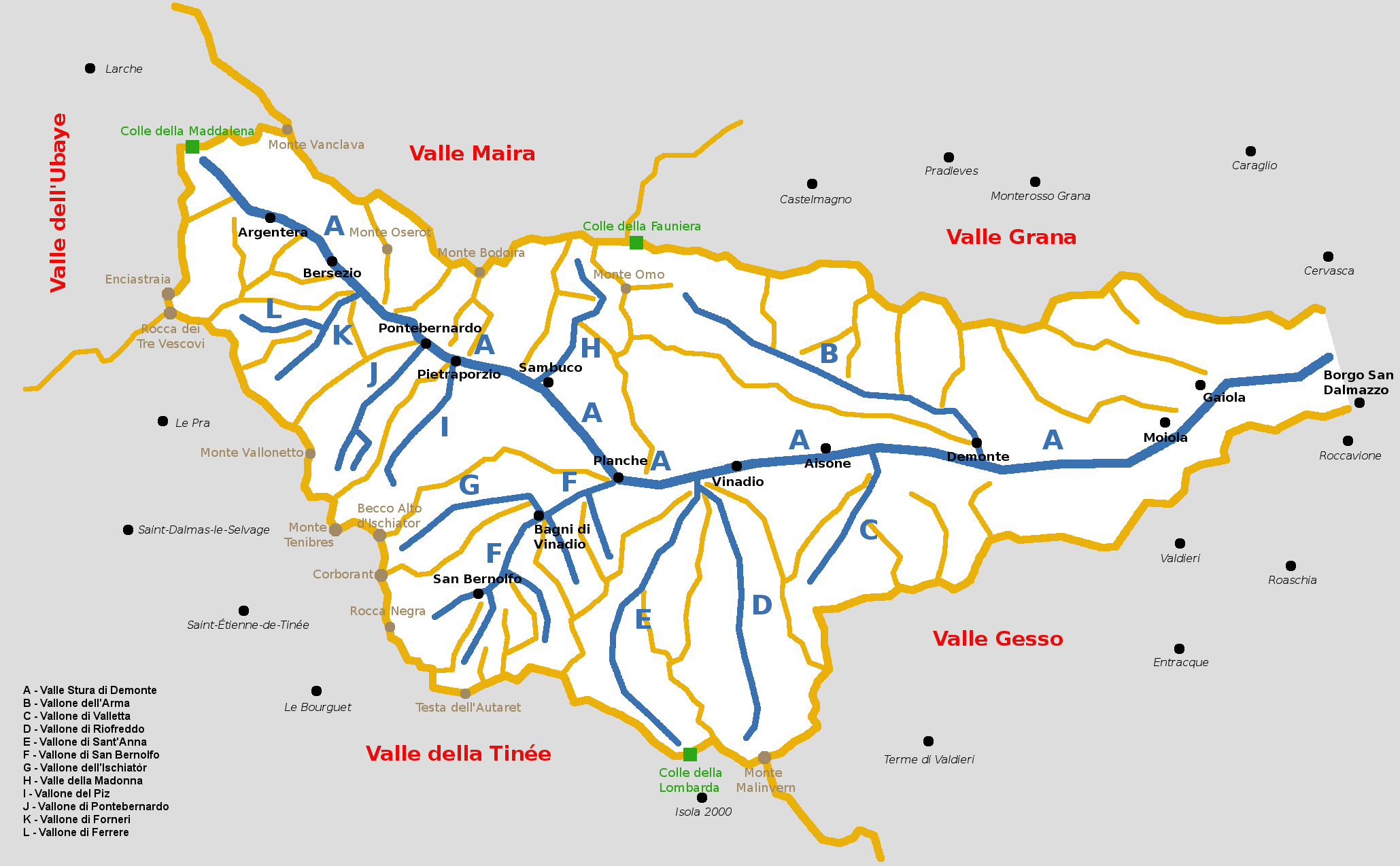
- Schematic map of the valley
- Floor elevation: 630–3,031 m (2,067–9,944 ft)
- Length: around 50 km (31 mi) west east

Geology
- Type: glacial and karts valley

Geography
- Location: Piedmont, Italy
- Coordinates: 44°19′N 7°10′E

The Stura di Demonte Valley (in Italian Valle Stura di Demonte) is a valley in south-west of Piedmont in the Province of Cuneo, Italy.

== Etymology ==
The valley takes its name from the river Stura di Demonte, a left-hand tributary of the Tanaro which flows through the approximately 50-kilometre-long (31 mi) valley.

== Geography ==
The municipalities of the valley are Aisone, Argentera, Borgo San Dalmazzo, Demonte, Gaiola, Moiola, Pietraporzio, Rittana, Roccasparvera, Sambuco, Valloriate and Vinadio.

== Notable summits ==
The notable summits which surround the valley include:

- Monte Tenibres - 3,031 m (9,944 ft)
- Cima di Corborant - 3,007 m (9,865 ft)
- Becco Alto d'Ischiator - 2,996 m (9,829 ft)
- Testa dell'Ubac - 2,991 m (9,813 ft)
- Enciastraia - 2,955 m (9,695 ft)
- Rocca dei Tre Vescovi - 2,867 m (9,406 ft)

== Access ==
The valley can be reached by car/bus from the Po Plain following the strada statale nr. 21 della Maddalena, which ends with the Colle della Maddalena and connects the Valle Stura di Demonte with the Ubaye Valley (France).
