= Limone Piemonte =

Limone Piemonte Limon
- Comune
- Comune di Limone Piemonte
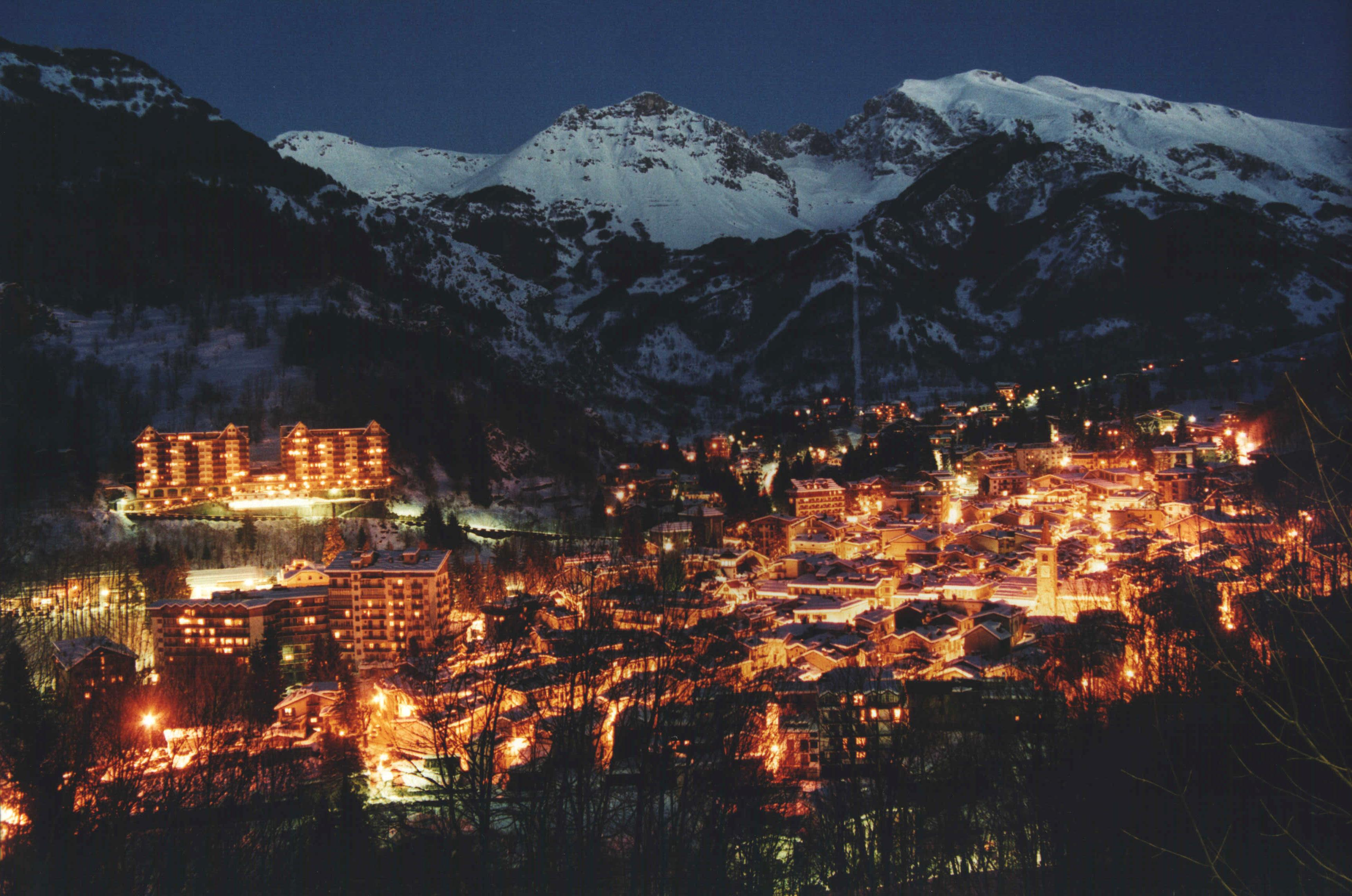
- Limone Piemonte in winter, at sunset

- Coat of arms

- Location within Italy Location within Piedmont
- Coordinates: 44°12′N 7°34′E
- Country: Italy
- Region: Piedmont
- Province: Province of Cuneo (CN)
- Frazioni: Fantino, Limonetto, Panice Soprana, Panice Sottana, San Bernardo, Tetti Mecci

Government
  - Mayor: Massimo Riberi (lista civica Viviamo Limone)

Area
  - Total: 71.3 km^{2} (27.5 sq mi)
- Elevation: 1,009 m (3,310 ft)

Population (September 2017)
  - Total: 1,474
  - Density: 20.7/km^{2} (53.5/sq mi)
- Demonym: Limonese(i)
- Time zone: UTC+1 (CET)
  - Summer (DST): UTC+2 (CEST)
- Postal code: 12015
- Dialing code: 0171
- Patron saint: Saint Peter
- Saint day: 1st Sunday of August
- Website: Official website

Limone Piemonte (Vivaro-Alpine: Limon) is a comune (municipality) in the Province of Cuneo in the Italian region Piedmont, located about 100 kilometres (62 mi) south of Turin and about 20 kilometres (12 mi) south of Cuneo, on the border with France. As of September 2017, it had a population of 1,476 and an area of 71.3 square kilometres (27.5 mi^{2}).

The train reached Limone in 1891 and made it to be a "ski-station", after in 1897 the skis arrived in Italy. In 1907 a competition began the official history of ski in Limone and in 2007 the town celebrated the "Century of skiing". Its fortune was permitted also by the presence of the Col de Tende Road Tunnel, which connected the town with many rich and famous locations, such as Montecarlo, Nice and Sanremo. Limone Piemonte borders the following municipalities: Boves, Briga Alta, Chiusa di Pesio, Entracque, La Brigue (France), Peveragno, Tende (France), Vernante, Robilante, Roccavione, Borgo San Dalmazzo.

== Ski resort ==
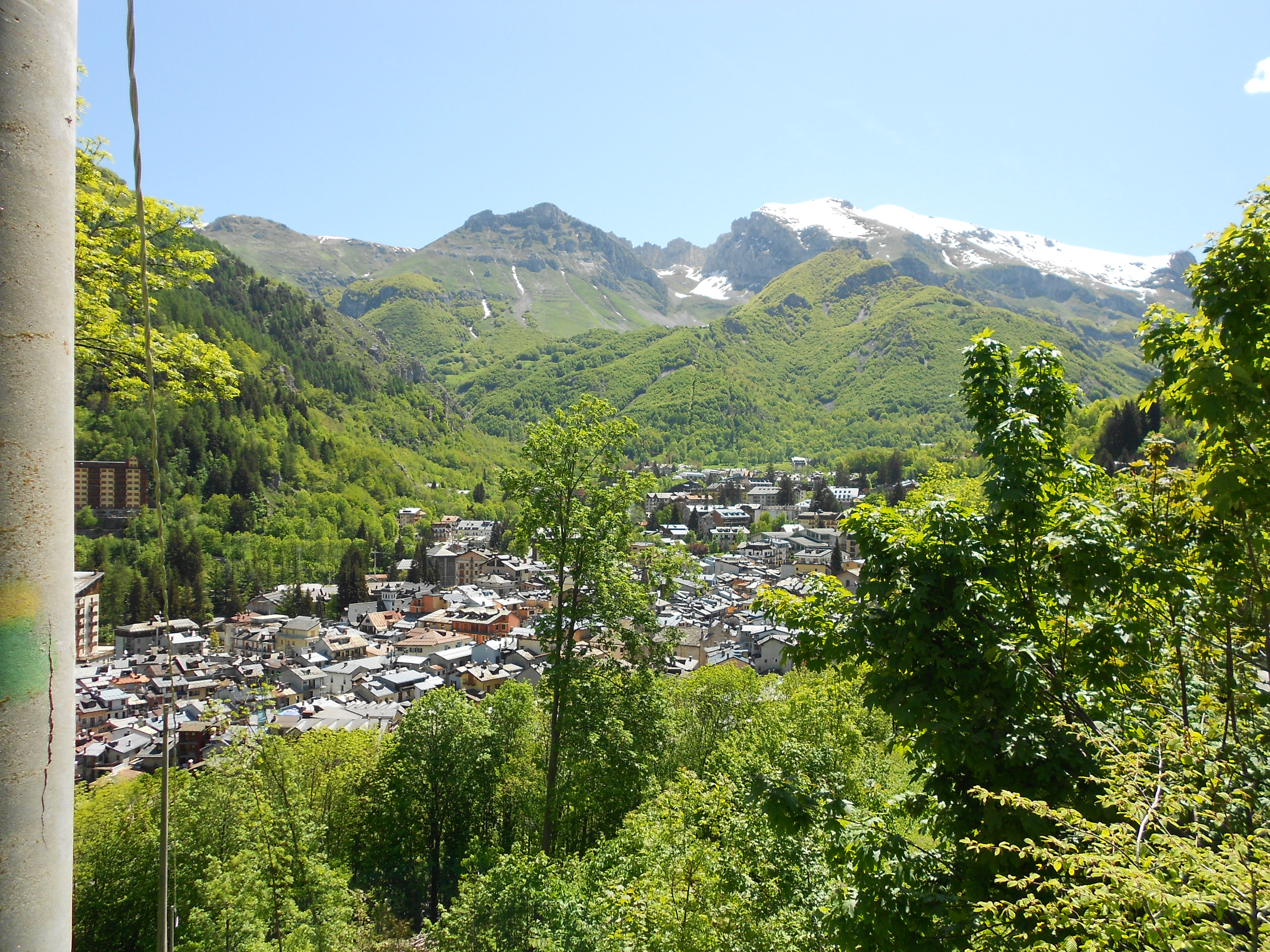
Limone in the spring period

Limone Piemonte is one of the oldest ski resorts in Italy. The Riserva Bianca (eng: White Reserve) consists in about 80 kilometres of trails, served by 1 gondola lift, 10 chairlifts, 3 ski lifts and 2 carpets: it connects three different ski areas (Limone-Sole, Tre Amis, Limonetto) while a fourth one (Limone-Cros), too far from the other three, was abandoned in 1998. The resort hosted several editions of the FIS Alpine Ski World Cup and the FIS Snowboard World Cup. Before the beginning of the 2006 Winter Olympics its trails had been chosen as an alternative location for skiing and snowboarding training and competitions, in case of lack of snow in the Susa Valley, so they had been homologated to the standards and equipped with newer chairlifts. Moreover, thanks to the presence of untouched fields and to the heavy winter snowfall of this section of the Alps, Limone is becoming more and more famous for off-piste skiing.

== Demographic evolution ==
Historical population

Year	Pop.	±%
1861	3,509	—
1871	3,518	+0.3%
1881	3,249	−7.6%
1901	3,063	−5.7%
1911	3,133	+2.3%

Year	Pop.	±%
1921	2,590	−17.3%
1931	2,193	−15.3%
1936	1,905	−13.1%
1951	2,114	+11.0%
1961	1,871	−11.5%

Year	Pop.	±%
1971	1,890	+1.0%
1981	1,739	−8.0%
1991	1,581	−9.1%
2001	1,548	−2.1%

Source: Data from ISTAT
