= Boves, Piedmont =

Boves
- Comune
- Comune di Boves
- Coat of arms

- Location within Italy Location within Piedmont
- Coordinates: 44°20′N 7°33′E
- Country: Italy
- Region: Piedmont
- Province: Cuneo (CN)
- Frazioni: Castellar, Cerati, Fontanelle, Madonna dei Boschi, San Mauro, Rivoira, San Giacomo, Sant'Anna, Mellana

Government
  - Mayor: Maurizio Paoletti

Area
  - Total: 51.1 km^{2} (19.7 sq mi)
- Elevation: 542 m (1,778 ft)

Population (31 December 2010) It is one of the major centers of the Occitan Valleys language region.
  - Total: 9,867
  - Density: 193/km^{2} (500/sq mi)
- Demonym: Bovesani
- Time zone: UTC+1 (CET)
  - Summer (DST): UTC+2 (CEST)
- Postal code: 12012
- Dialing code: 0171
- Website: Official website

Boves is a comune (municipality) in the Province of Cuneo in the Italian region Piedmont, located about 80 kilometres (50 mi) south of Turin and about 6 kilometres (4 mi) south of Cuneo. It borders the following municipalities: Borgo San Dalmazzo, Cuneo, Limone Piemonte, Peveragno, Robilante, Roccavione, and Vernante.

The town of Boves was the scene, on 19 September 1943, of a massacre of civilians by the 1st SS Panzer Division, in which the German troops set fire to more than 350 houses and killed numerous villagers.

== Twin towns ==
- Castello di Godego, Italy
- Mauguio, France
