= Cima di Nasta =

Mountain in Italy

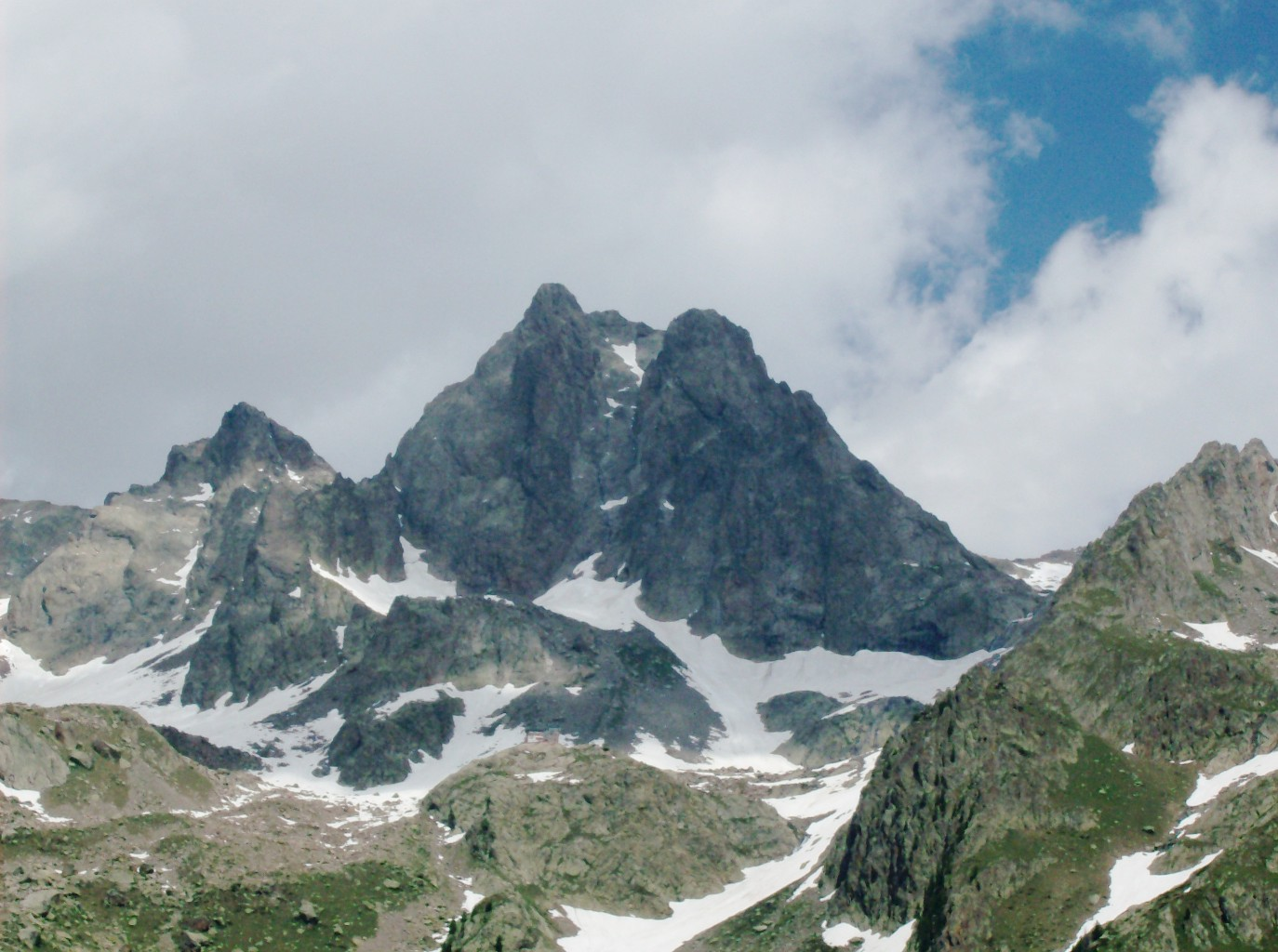
- Cima di Nasta (centre) and Cime Paganini (left) as seen from the west

Highest point
- Elevation: 3,108 m (10,197 ft)
- Prominence: 169 m (554 ft)
- Coordinates: 44°09′56″N 7°18′24″E

Naming
- Native name: Cima di Nasta (Italian); Cime de Nasta (French)

Geography
- Location within Piedmont Location within Italy
- Country: Italy
- Province: Cuneo
- Region: Piedmont
- Parent range: Maritime Alps

Geology
- Rock type: Gneiss

Cima di Nasta (French: Cime de Nasta) is a mountain in the Maritime Alps. It is located in the upper Gesso valley, between the comunes of Valdieri and Entracque, and belongs to the Argentera massif.

== Geography ==
It is located on the secondary ridge which, detaching itself from the main Alpine watershed from Cime Guilié in a northerly direction, reaches Mount Argentera. The watershed of this ridge, on which the peak lies, separates Valdieri and Entracque. Geologically, it is composed of gneiss.

== Ascent ==
The first ascent was made in 1878 by British mountaineer Douglas Freshfield. It was an ascent "by mistake" as Freshfield intended to climb the southern peak of Argentera.
