= Valle Gesso =

Valley in the Italian Maritime Alps

Coordinates: 44.2200°N 7.3900°E

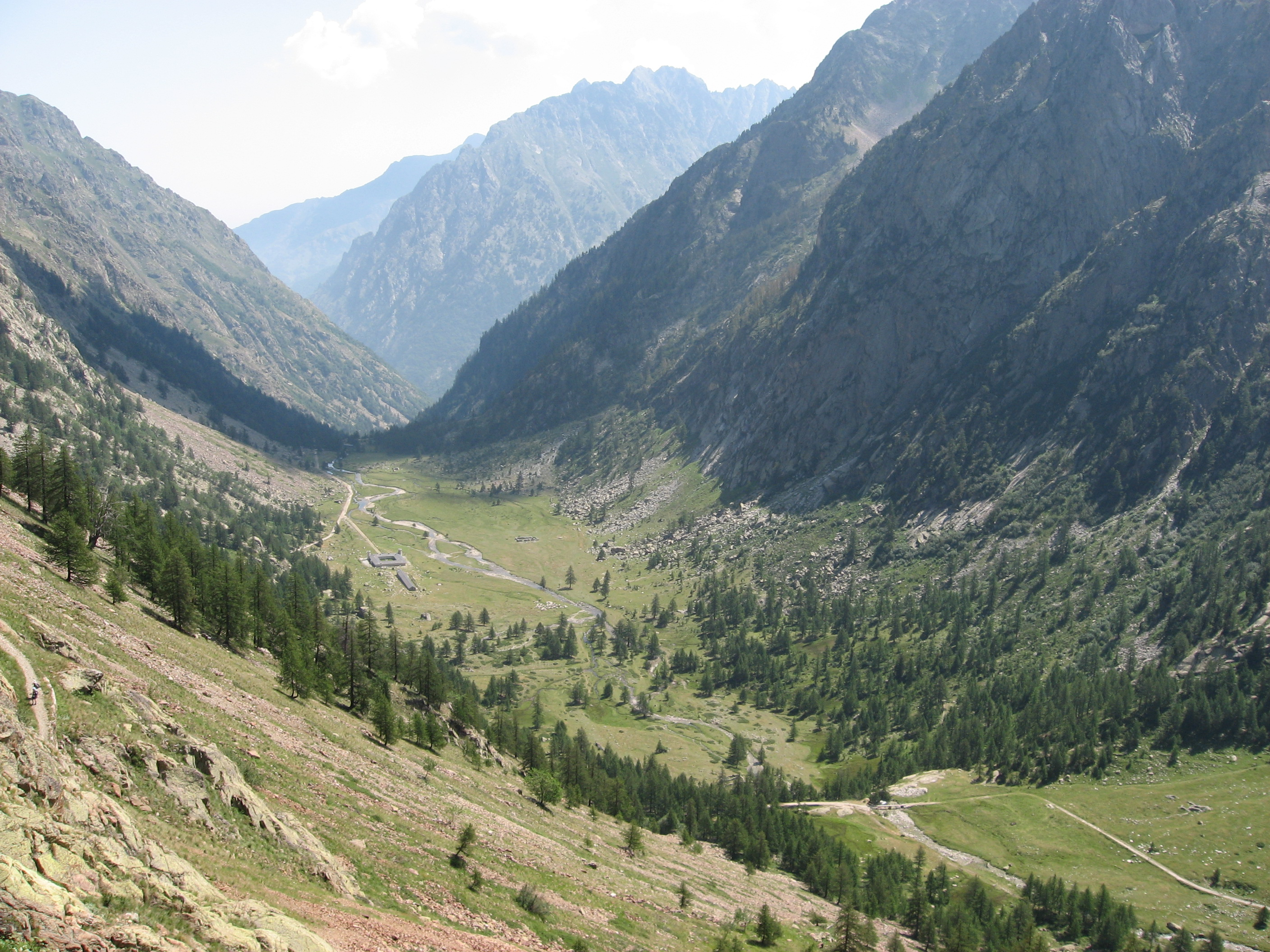
The Pan del Valasco, a small plateau in the valley.

Valle Gesso is a valley in the Maritime Alps (south-western Alps), located in the Italian province of Cuneo and crossed by the Gesso torrent.

The language spoken by the inhabitants belongs to the Occitan language family.

== Geography ==
The valley is home to the highest peaks in the range, those of Monte Argentera (3,297 m). Its territory is divided between the municipalities of Entracque, Roaschia, Valdieri and Roccavione. Nearby valleys include the Valle Vermenagna, the Tinée valley in France and the Valle Stura di Demonte. After Valdieri, the valleys divided into two sub-valleys known as Valle Gesso di Entracque and Valle Gesso della Valletta.

== History ==
Historically, the valley was inhabited by the Ligures, who were defeated by the Romans in 14 BC. After the fall of the Roman empire, around 600, the Benedictines founded here the Abbey of Pedona, which controlled the valley until emperor Louis I gave it to the bishops of Asti in 901. In the 13th century, after a short period under the Marquisate of Saluzzo, it was acquired by the Angevines, who had created a county in Piedmont with Cuneo as its capital.

After the 14th century it became a fief of the Duchy of Savoy, to which it belonged until the 19th century, aside from a short French rule after the French Revolutionary Wars. The Savoy family created here a resort and a personal hunting reserve, which later became the Maritime Alps Natural Park. As a part of the Kingdom of Italy from 1861, the valley remained economically based on animal husbandry and agriculture; after World War II the presence of hydro-electric plant favored the creation of industries (especially cement plants), while tourist became increasingly relevant starting from the 1980s.

== See also ==
- Lake Vej del Bouc
