= Giardino Botanico Alpino Valderia =

Italian botanical garden and nature preserve

Coordinates: 44°16′15″N 7°12′12″E

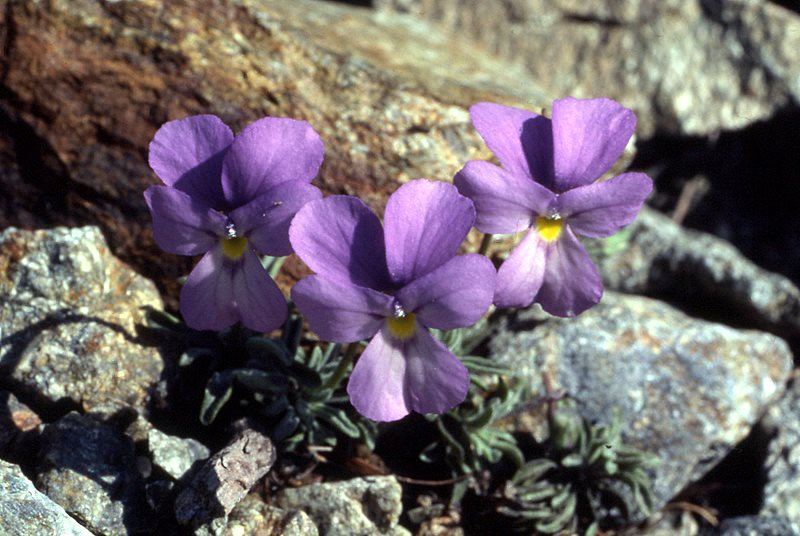
Viola valderia

The Giardino Botanico Alpino Valderia is a botanical garden and nature preserve located in the Parco Naturale Alpi Marittime, Corso Dante Livio Bianco 5, Valdieri, Province of Cuneo, Piedmont, Italy.

The garden was established in 1990, and currently contains about 450 species of which 26 are endemic to the Maritime Alps. Its collections include Caltha palustris, Epilobium alsinifolium, Galium tendae, Potentilla valderia, Dasiphora fruticosa, Saxifraga florulenta, S. aizoides, Micranthes stellaris, Senecio balbisianus, Silene cordifolia, Viola argenteria, and Viola valderia.

== See also ==
- List of botanical gardens in Italy
