= Maritime Alps Natural Park =

Nature reserve in Piedmont, Italy

Parco naturale delle Alpi Marittime
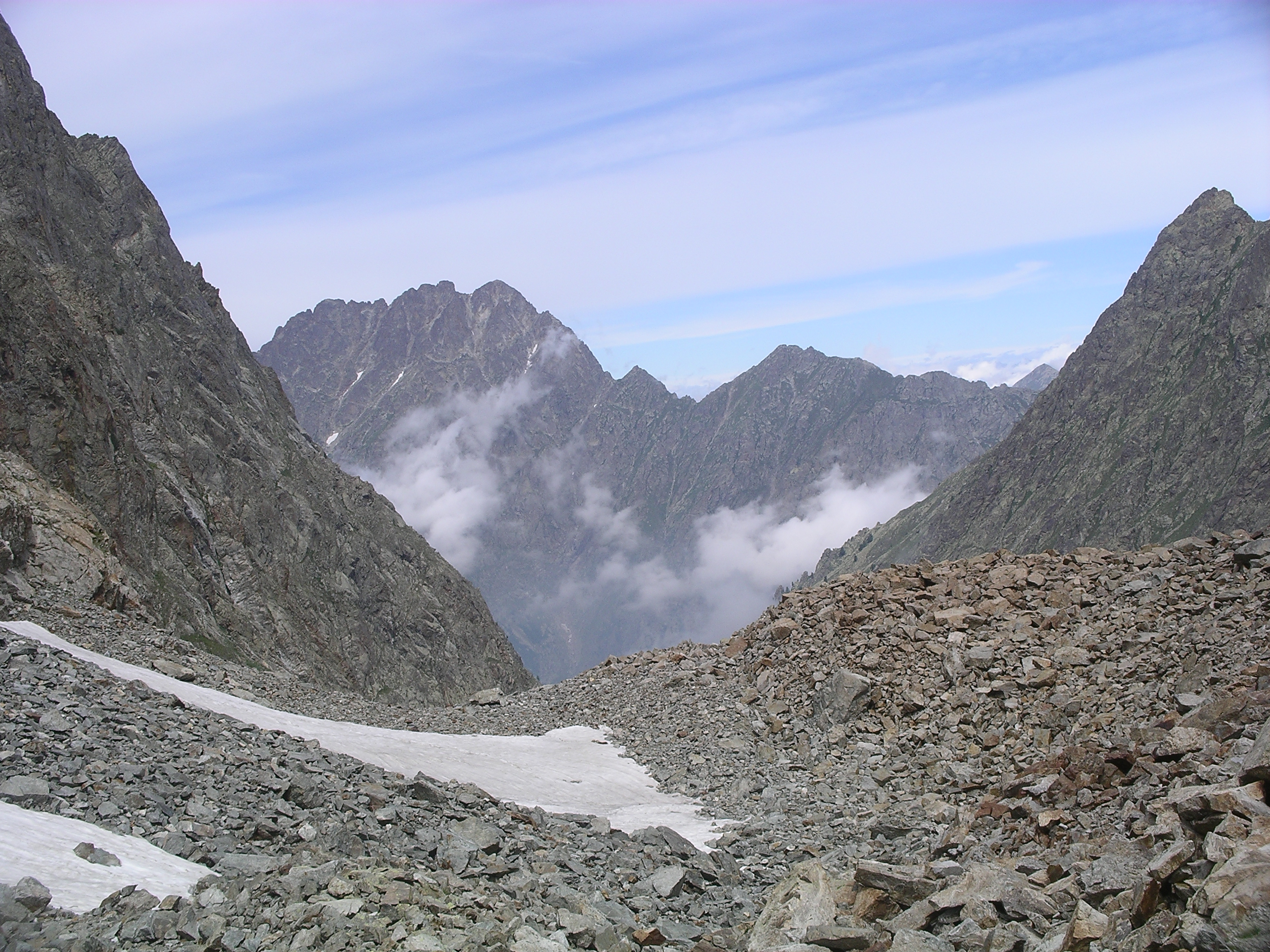
- Interactive map of Parco naturale delle Alpi Marittime
- Location: Piedmont, Italy
- Coordinates: 44°11′N 7°20′E
- Area: 27,832 ha (68,770 acres)
- Established: 1980
- Website: www.parcoalpimarittime.it

The Maritime Alps Natural Park (Italian: Parco naturale delle Alpi Marittime) is a nature reserve in Piedmont, Italy. Originally established in 1980 as the Argentera Natural Park, in an area previously part of a royal hunting reserve established by Victor Emmanuel II in 1857, it assumed its current name and form in 1995, when it was merged with the Palanfrè Woods and Lakes Natural Reserve. Located near the border with France, the park borders the Mercantour National Park.

The park lies entirely within the Province of Cuneo, in the territory of five municipalities, and encompasses the upper Valle Gesso, the Valle Vermenagna and part of the Valle Stura di Demonte, covering the two most prominent massifs of the Maritime Alps, the Argentera and the Gélas. The lowest point of the park is 750 meters above sea level, whereas the highest is the peak of the Argentera, 3,297 meters above sea level. Nearly half of its territory (47 %) is composed of rocky terrain, whereas 22 % is covered by woods, 11 % by shrubs, 17 % by grasslands, and 1 % by glaciers. The Gélas glaciers are the southernmost glaciers in the Alps; about eighty lakes are located in the territory of the park.

The park's fauna also includes chamoises (4,500 specimens), roe deer, red deer, alpine ibexes (500 specimens), European mouflons, Italian wolves, wild boars, red foxes, European pine martens, European badgers, beech martens, marmots, least weasels, stoats, red squirrels, European fat dormouses, voles, garden dormouses, European hedgehogs, European moles, shrews, and 75 species of birds, including the golden eagle (seven pairs of which nest in the park), the short-toed snake-eagle, the Eurasian goshawk, the Eurasian sparrowhawk, the European honey buzzard, the common buzzard, the peregrine falcon, the rock ptarmigan, the black grouse, the rock partridge, the Eurasian eagle-owl, the black woodpecker, the tree pipit, the water pipit, the alpine chough, the red-billed chough, the white-winged snowfinch, and the recently reintroduced bearded vulture.

The flora includes 2,600 species of plants, including European spruces, European larches, silver firs, mountain pines, European beechs, common laburnums, common hazels, sycamores, pteridophytes, alpenroses.

Ten mountain huts, ten mountain shelters and over 400 kilometres of hiking paths allow visitors to explore the park.

== See also ==
- Lake Vej del Bouc
