= Lake Vej del Bouc =

Glacial lake in Piedmont, Italy

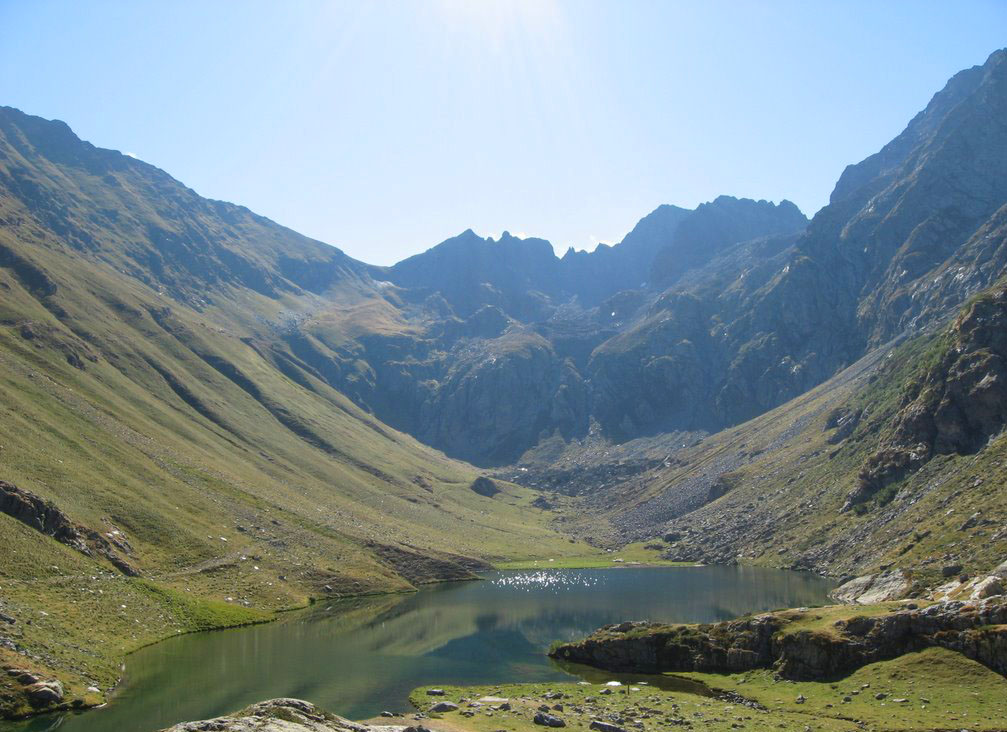
- Lake Vej del Bouc
- Interactive map of Lake Vej del Bouc
- Location: Entracque, Province of Cuneo, Piedmont, Italy
- Coordinates: 44.1239°N 7.4064°E
- Type: Glacial
- Basin countries: Italy
- Max. length: 0.45 km (0.28 mi)
- Max. width: 0.2 km (0.12 mi)
- Surface area: 0.05 km^{2} (0.019 sq mi)
- Surface elevation: 2,054 m (6,739 ft)

The Lake Vej del Bouc is a mountain lake in the territory of the municipality of Entracque, Valle Gesso (CN).

== Description ==
This lake, located at 2,054 m a.s.l., is of medium to large size, formed by an ancient glacier. The powerful erosive action of the glacier is still visible on the rocks that close the lake downstream. Around the lake, however, there are some rock engravings, some recent and others prehistoric: the latter are difficult to identify.

== Access ==
After passing the settlement of Borgo San Dalmazzo, continue toward Valdieri and, after passing it, at the fork for Sant’Anna di Valdieri, follow the signs for Entracque. After about 500 m, turn right toward San Giacomo and from there begin to climb toward the Piastra dam and the Chiotas dam. Upon reaching the fork for San Giacomo, continue to the hamlet, where there is a large parking area. At this point, leave the car, cross the bridge, and follow the dirt road leading to the Rifugio Pagarì. At a certain point, the road gives way to two mule tracks, trail markers M13 and M14. Abandon the first and follow the M14 mule track, which leads to Lake Vej del Bouc. Ascent time from San Giacomo, approximately 3 hours.

== Nature protection ==
This lake is part of the Maritime Alps Natural Park.

== History ==
The first project of the P.C.E. in 1954 (Piedmont Central Electricity, later absorbed by Enel in 1962), concerning the hydroelectric plants of the Valle Gesso, planned, in addition to the creation of other reservoirs (dam of Chiotas, dam of Piastra, and Lago della Rovina), a raising of the banks of Lake Vej del Bouc to achieve a total reservoir capacity of 4 million m³ for hydroelectric purposes.

== See also ==
- Valle Gesso
- Lago del Chiotas

== Bibliography ==
- Aime, Simone (2021). Diga del Chiotas. Storia del cantiere nell'Alto Gesso raccontata da chi ci ha lavorato [Chiotas Dam. History of the Construction Site in Upper Gesso Told by Those Who Worked There] (in Italian). Ass. Primalpe Costanzo Martini. ISBN 978-8863873986.
- Aime, Simone (2023). 1924-2024 La valle Gesso e l'idroelettrico, il progetto originale e mai realizzato [1924-2024 The Valle Gesso and Hydroelectric Power, the Original and Never Realized Project] (in Italian). Ass. Primalpe Costanzo Martini. ISBN 9788863875317.
- Parodi, Andrea. Laghi, Cascate e altre Meraviglie [Lakes, Waterfalls, and Other Wonders] (in Italian). Andrea Parodi Editore.
