= Monte Matto =

Mountain in Italy

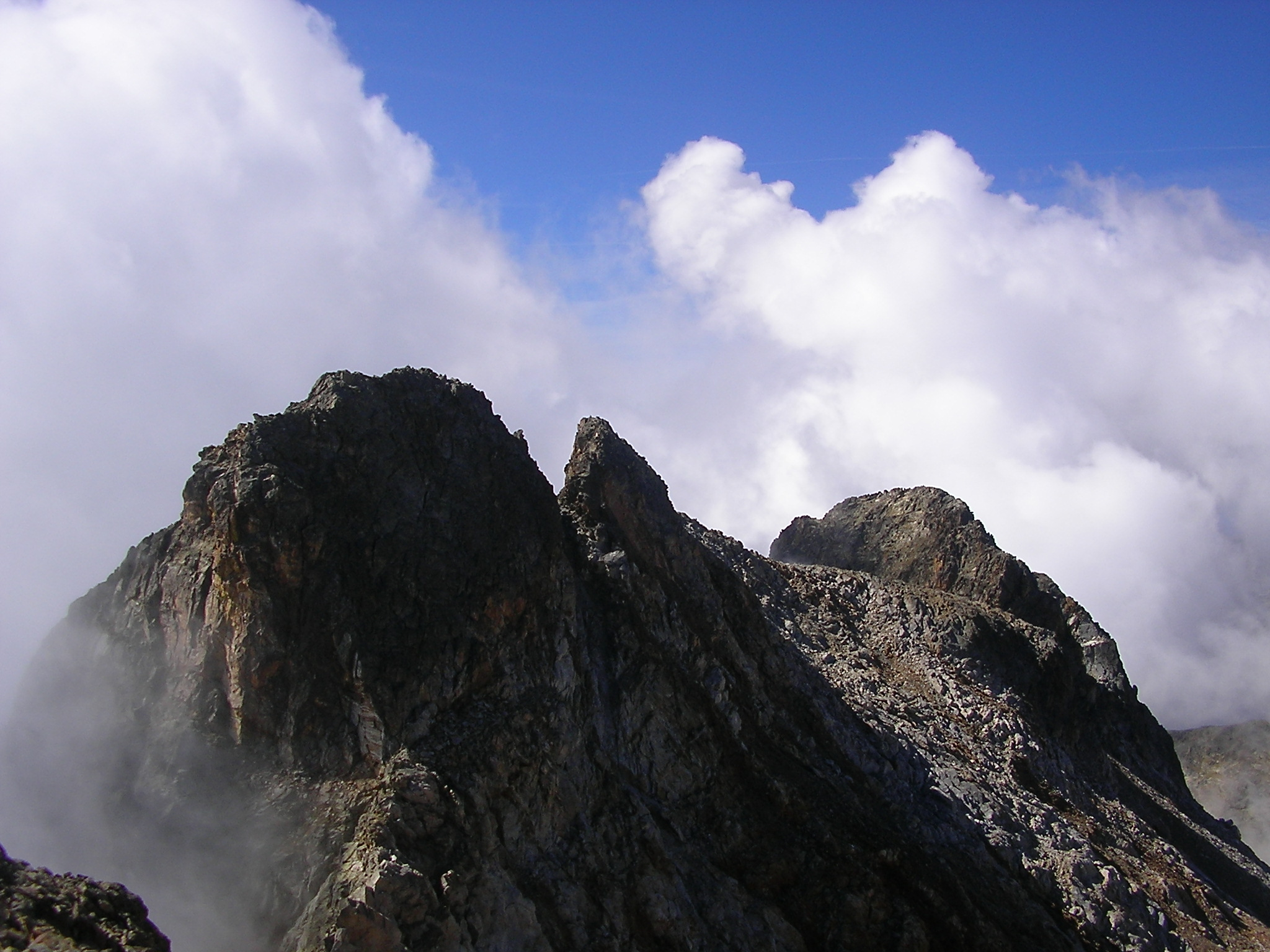
- The central peak of Monte Matto

Highest point
- Elevation: 3,097 m (10,161 ft)
- Prominence: 597 m (1,959 ft)
- Listing: Alpine mountains above 3000 m
- Coordinates: 44°13′28″N 7°15′11″E

Geography
- Location within Alps
- Location: Piedmont, Italy
- Parent range: Maritime Alps

Climbing
- First ascent: 14 August 1879 by William Auguste Coolidge

Monte Matto is a 3,097-meter-high (10,161-foot) mountain in Piedmont, in the province of Cuneo, Italy. It is part of the Maritime Alps, dividing the Meris valley from the Gesso della Valletta valley.

The mountain peak, consisting of a ridge of four aligned summits, can be seen from most of the plains near Cuneo. The ridge is composed of two different rock formations, one made up of granitoid gneiss, the other of mixed gneiss and different kinds of migmatite. The four peaks are (from east to west) cima Est (3,088 m), cima Centrale (3,097 m), cima Bobba (3,079 m) and cima Verani (3,020 m).

The mountain is clearly visible from the plains around Cuneo as a triangular shape with a peculiar tiny "tooth" (which corresponds to cima Centrale, i.e. the central summit). It is part of the natural park Parco Naturale delle Alpi Marittime. The fauna includes marmot, chamois and, at higher altitudes, the alpine ibex.

== Gallery ==
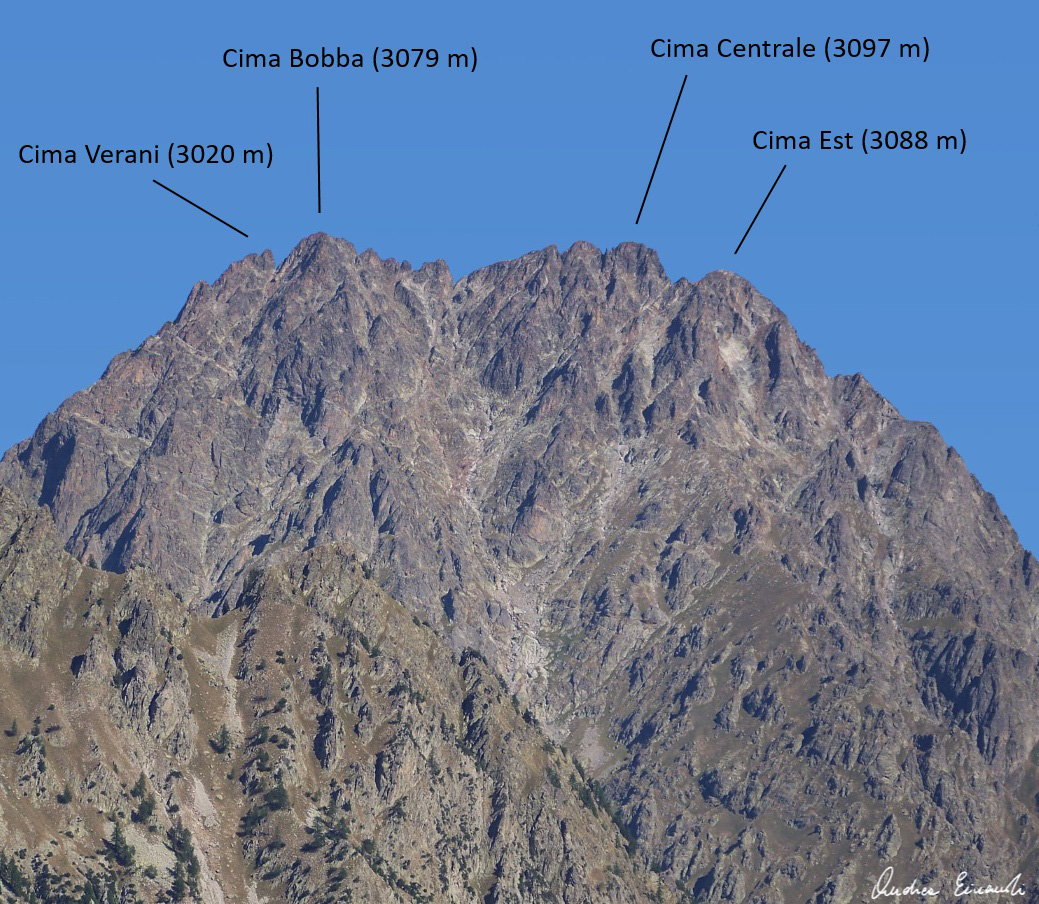
The four summits of Monte Matto (southern face)

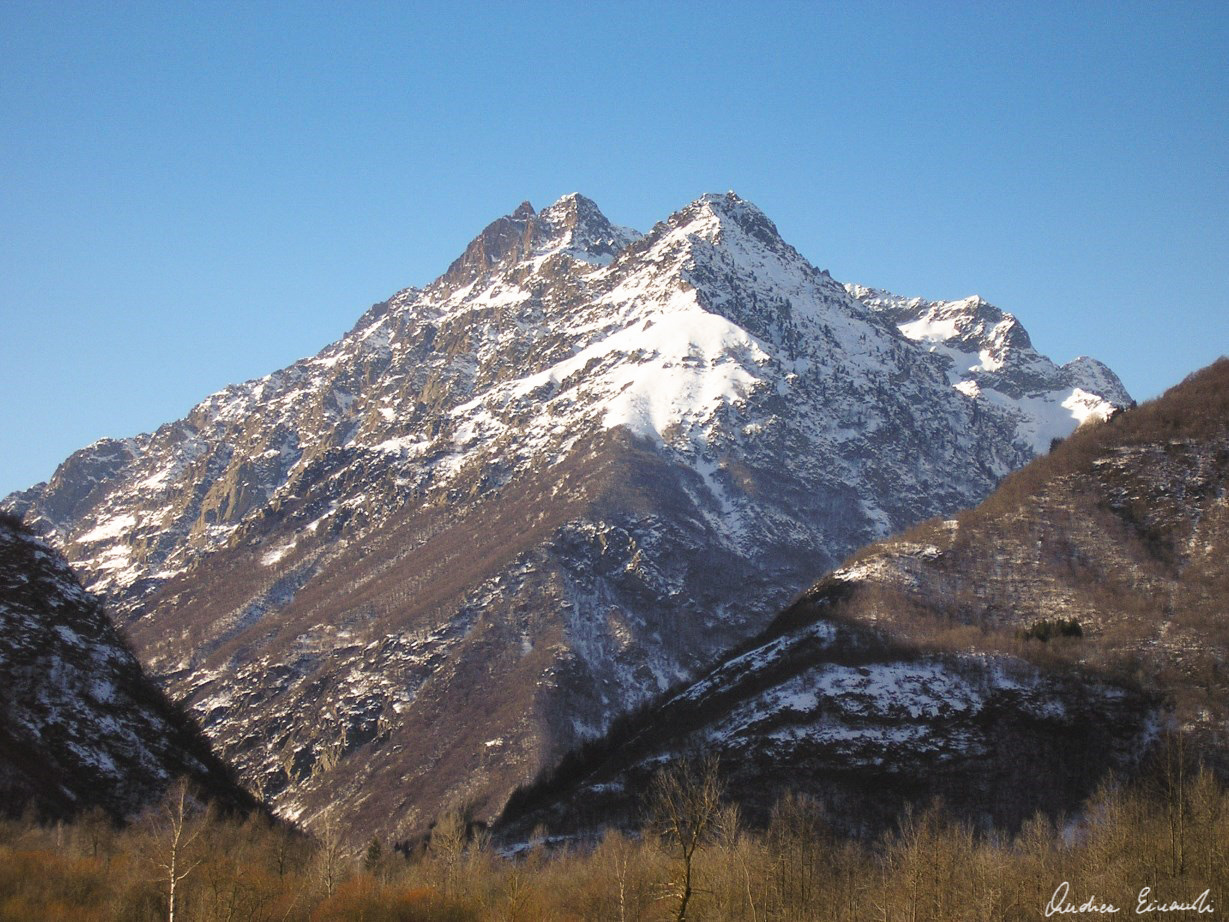
Monte Matto from east

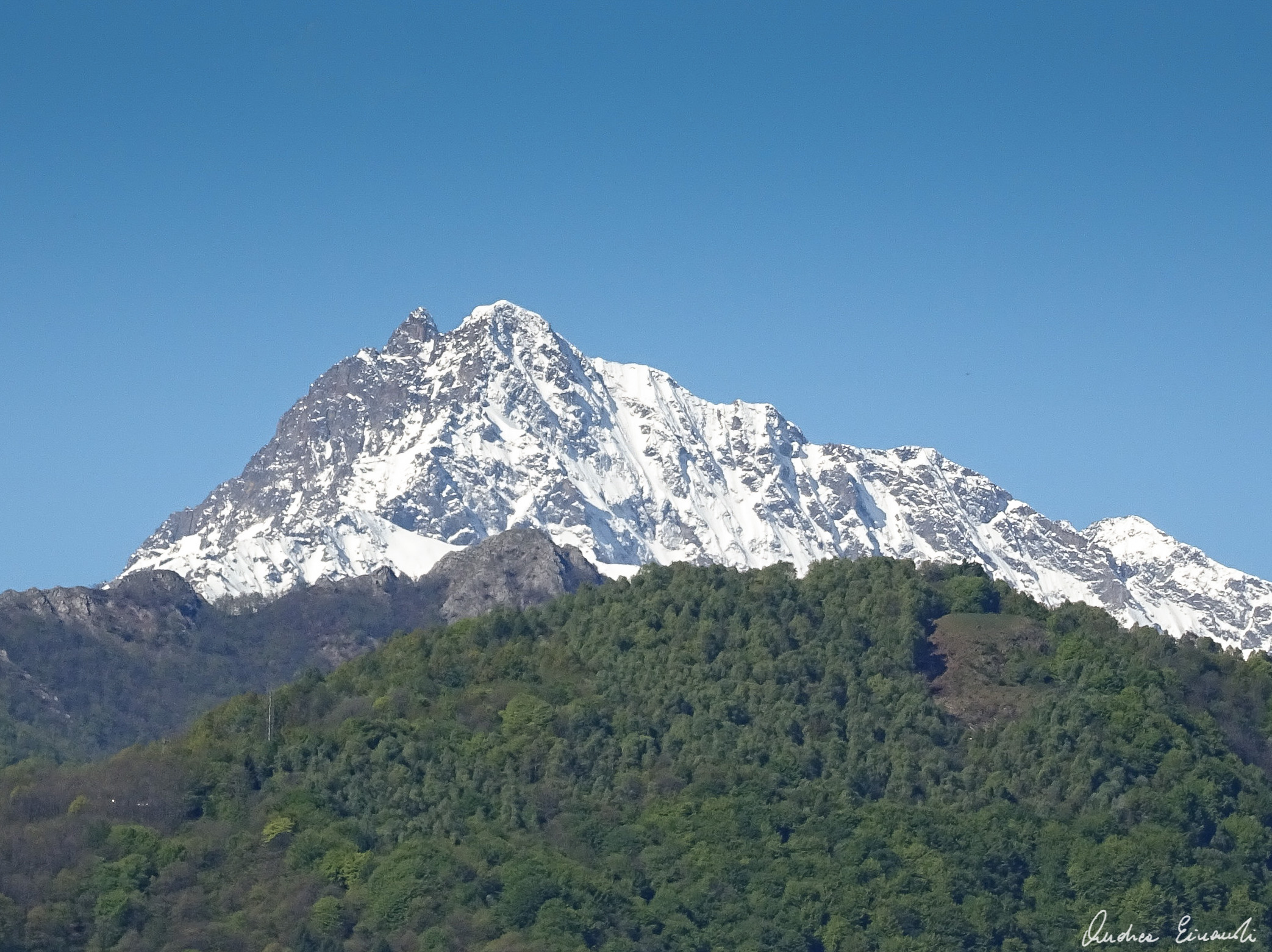
Monte Matto from Cuneo (the "tooth" is visible)
