= Giovanni Baleison =

Italian painter (died 1500)

- Known for: Painting

Giovanni Baleison or Giovanni Belisoni (active 1480–1500) was an Italian fresco artist, active in the Piedmont, Liguria, and France.

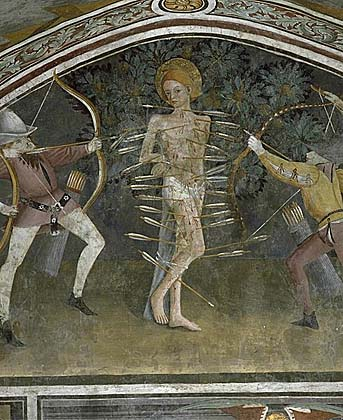
Giovanni Baleison, Cycle on the life of Saint Sebastian, fresco, detail of main altar, St. Sebastian Church, Saint-Étienne-de-Tinée, Alpes-Maritimes, France

== Biography ==
He was born in Demonte, Piedmont. He executed frescoes at a number of churches, including St Sebastian Churches of Venanson, Saint-Étienne-de-Tinée, and Celle di Macra. He also painted frescoes (1482-1485) for the chapel of St Sebastian in the church of Santi Sebastiano e Fabiano in Marmora, Piedmont. The frescoes depict the infancy of Christ: Nativity, Adoration by the magi, plus an Apocriphal story about the Miracle of the Grain during the Flight to Egypt. Also there are frescoes depicting the Life of Saint Sebastian. He painted an Enthroned Madonna in the apse of the church of Santa Maria della Pieve in Beinette. Other frescoes in the church are attributed to Amedeo Albini.
