= Cime du Gélas =

Mountain in Italy

- Monte Gelàs
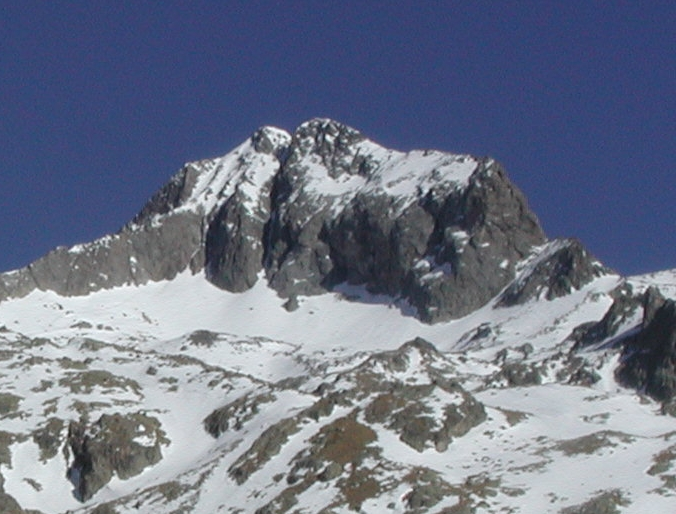

Highest point
- Elevation: 3,143 m (10,312 ft)
- Prominence: 669 m (2,195 ft)
- Isolation: 8.51 km (5.29 mi)
- Listing: Alpine mountains above 3000 m
- Coordinates: 44°07′30″N 7°23′20″E

Geography
- Location within Alps
- Location: Piedmont, Italy; Provence-Alpes-Côte d'Azur, France
- Parent range: Maritime Alps

Climbing
- First ascent: 1864 by Paolo di Saint-Robert

Cime du Gélas (Italian: Monte Gelàs) is a 3,143 m high mountain on the boundary between France (Provence-Alpes-Côte d'Azur region) and Italy (province of Cuneo). It is part of the Maritime Alps.

It is the highest peak of the Mercantour National Park, while on the Italian side it is included in the Maritime Alps Natural Park. Geologically, it is part of the Mercantour-Argentera massif, and is mostly formed by granitoid gneiss. The peak is composed of two smaller ones, divided by a gorge; the highest peak is the northern one, which is topped by a cross built here by priests from Cuneo.

The mountain's name derives from the glaciers which occupy its northern slopes, which have however reduced substantially during the late 20th century.

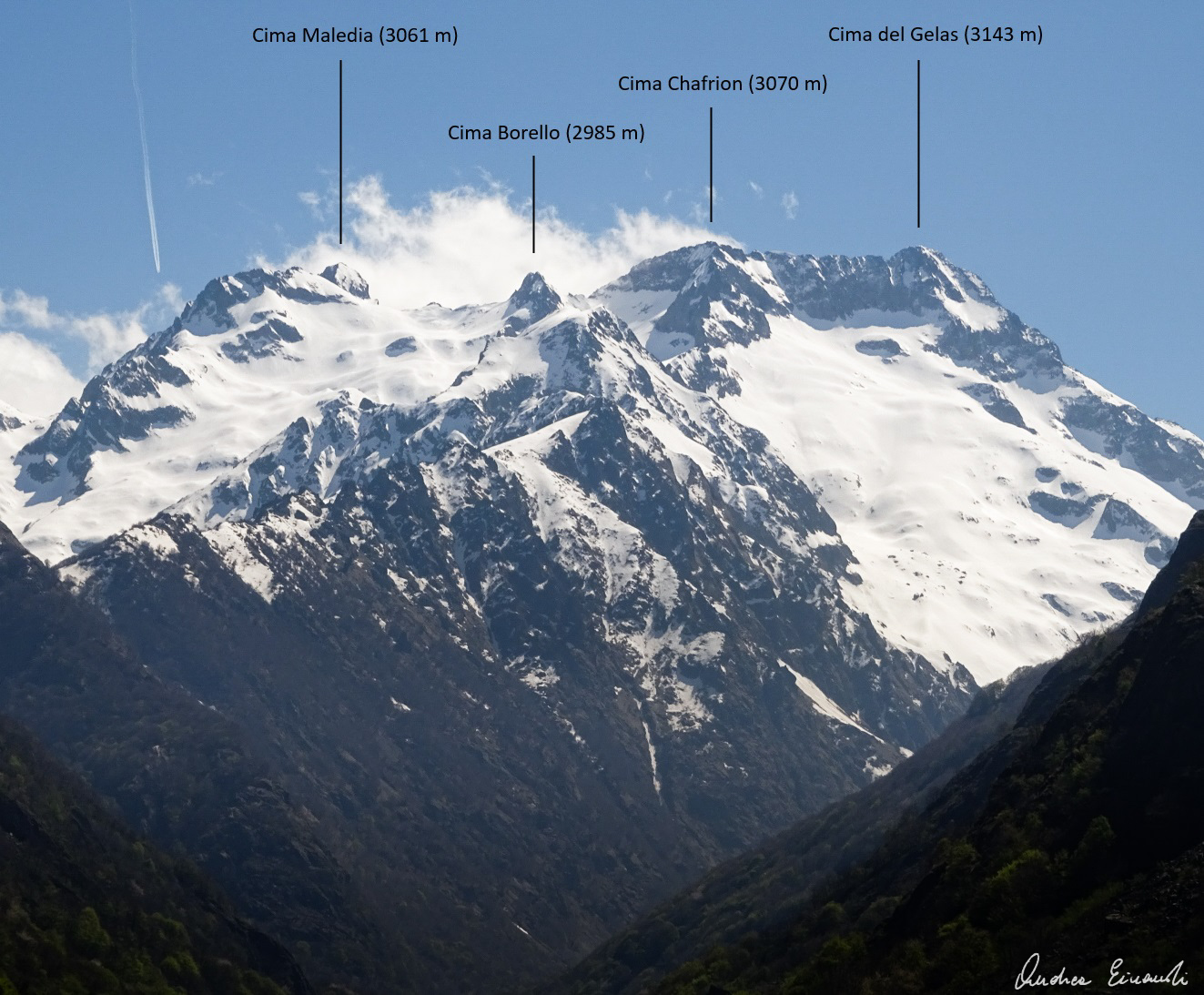
Monte Gelas and nearby summits from the road to lake Rovina

== Maps ==
- Italian official cartography (Istituto Geografico Militare - IGM); on-line version: www.pcn.minambiente.it
- French official cartography (Institut Géographique National - IGN); on-line version: www.geoportail.fr
