= Robilante =

- Comune
- Comune di Robilante
- Location within Italy Location within Piedmont
- Coordinates: 44°18′N 7°31′E
- Country: Italy
- Region: Piedmont
- Province: Province of Cuneo (CN)
- Frazioni: Tetto Pettavino, montasso, Tetto Chiappello

Area
  - Total: 24.9 km^{2} (9.6 sq mi)
- Elevation: 678 m (2,224 ft)

Population (Dec. 2004)
  - Total: 2,362
  - Density: 94.9/km^{2} (246/sq mi)
- Demonym: Robilantesi
- Time zone: UTC+1 (CET)
  - Summer (DST): UTC+2 (CEST)
- Postal code: 12017
- Dialing code: 0171

Robilante is a comune (municipality) in the Province of Cuneo in the Italian region Piedmont, located about 90 kilometres (56 mi) south of Turin and about 10 kilometres (6 mi) southwest of Cuneo. As of 31 December 2004, it had a population of 2,362 and an area of 24.9 square kilometres (9.6 mi^{2}).

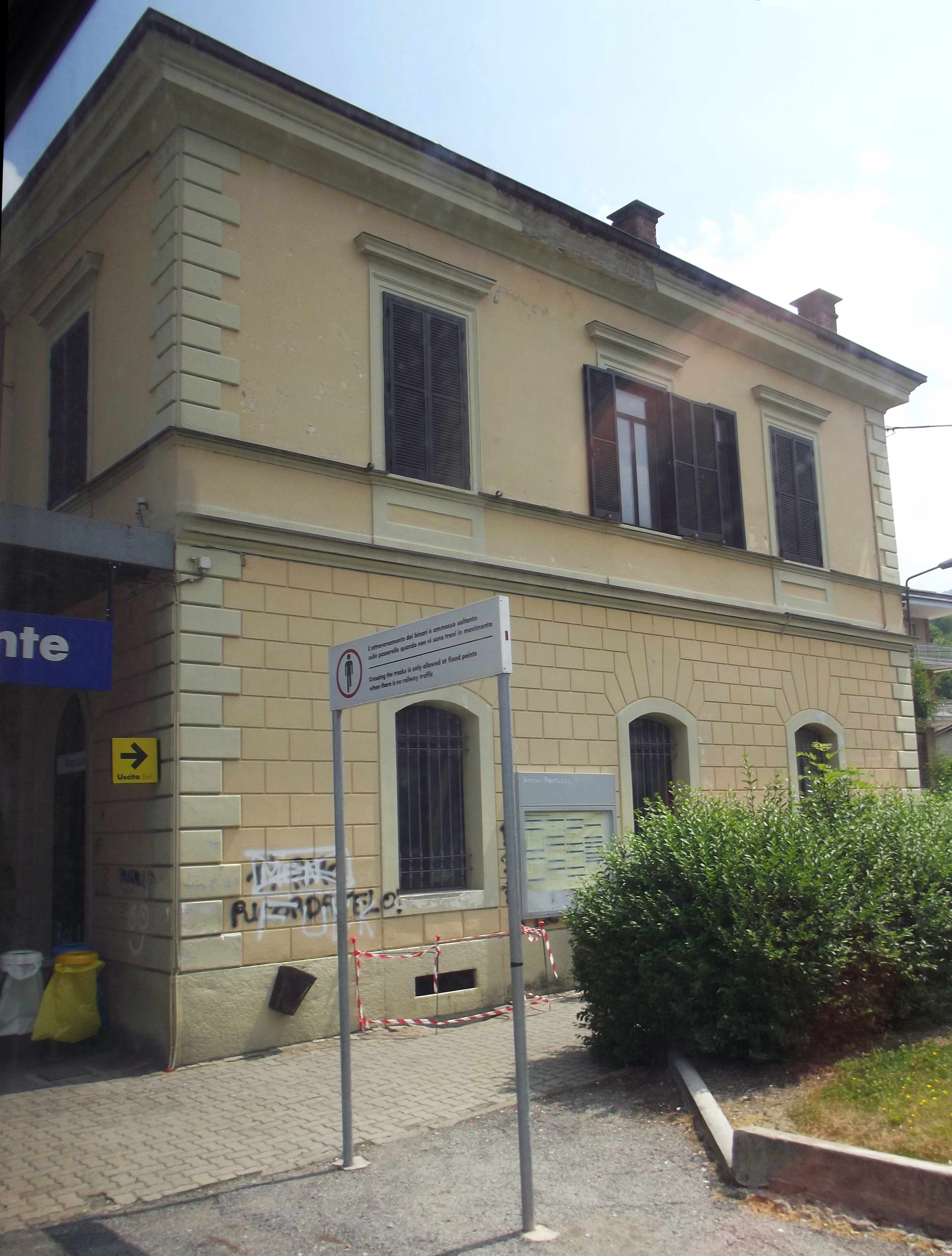
Robilante Station

The municipality of Robilante contains the frazioni (subdivisions, mainly villages and hamlets) Tetto Pettavino, Malandre, Montasso and Tetto Chiappello.

Robilante borders the following municipalities: Boves, Roaschia, Roccavione, and Vernante.

== Demographic evolution ==
Historical population

Year	Pop.	±%
1861	2,710	—
1871	2,756	+1.7%
1881	2,828	+2.6%
1901	3,172	+12.2%
1911	3,038	−4.2%

Year	Pop.	±%
1921	2,853	−6.1%
1931	2,537	−11.1%
1936	2,429	−4.3%
1951	2,326	−4.2%
1961	2,155	−7.4%

Year	Pop.	±%
1971	2,182	+1.3%
1981	2,269	+4.0%
1991	2,250	−0.8%
2001	2,316	+2.9%

Source: Data from ISTAT
