= Roaschia =

- Comune
- Comune di Roaschia
- Coat of arms

- Location within Italy Location within Piedmont
- Coordinates: 44°16′N 7°27′E
- Country: Italy
- Region: Piedmont
- Province: Cuneo (CN)

Government
  - Mayor: Viale Bruno

Area
  - Total: 24.1 km^{2} (9.3 sq mi)
- Elevation: 822 m (2,697 ft)

Population (31 July 2010)
  - Total: 157
  - Density: 6.51/km^{2} (16.9/sq mi)
- Time zone: UTC+1 (CET)
  - Summer (DST): UTC+2 (CEST)
- Postal code: 12010
- Dialing code: 0171

Roaschia is a comune (municipality) in the Province of Cuneo in the Italian region Piedmont, located about 90 kilometres (56 mi) south of Turin and about 15 kilometres (9 mi) southwest of Cuneo.

Roaschia borders the following municipalities: Entracque, Robilante, Roccavione, Valdieri, and Vernante.
