= Vernante =

- Comune
- Comune di Vernante
- Location within Italy Location within Piedmont
- Coordinates: 44°15′N 7°32′E
- Country: Italy
- Region: Piedmont
- Province: Province of Cuneo (CN)
- Frazioni: Palanfrè

Area
  - Total: 62.0 km^{2} (23.9 sq mi)
- Elevation: 800 m (2,600 ft)

Population (Dec. 2004)
  - Total: 1,307
  - Density: 21.1/km^{2} (54.6/sq mi)
- Demonym: Vernantini
- Time zone: UTC+1 (CET)
  - Summer (DST): UTC+2 (CEST)
- Postal code: 12019
- Dialing code: 0171

Vernante is a comune (municipality) in the Province of Cuneo in the Italian region Piedmont, located about 90 kilometres (56 mi) south of Turin and about 15 kilometres (9 mi) south of Cuneo. As of 31 December 2004, it had a population of 1,307 and an area of 62.0 square kilometres (23.9 mi^{2}).

The municipality of Vernante contains the frazione (subdivision) Palanfrè.

Vernante borders the following municipalities: Boves, Entracque, Limone Piemonte, Roaschia, and Robilante.

== Demographic evolution ==
Historical population

Year	Pop.	±%
1861	3,419	—
1871	3,606	+5.5%
1881	3,654	+1.3%
1901	4,519	+23.7%
1911	3,614	−20.0%

Year	Pop.	±%
1921	3,250	−10.1%
1931	2,701	−16.9%
1936	2,282	−15.5%
1951	2,248	−1.5%
1961	1,988	−11.6%

Year	Pop.	±%
1971	1,777	−10.6%
1981	1,641	−7.7%
1991	1,477	−10.0%
2001	1,332	−9.8%

Source: Data from ISTAT
