= Stura di Demonte =

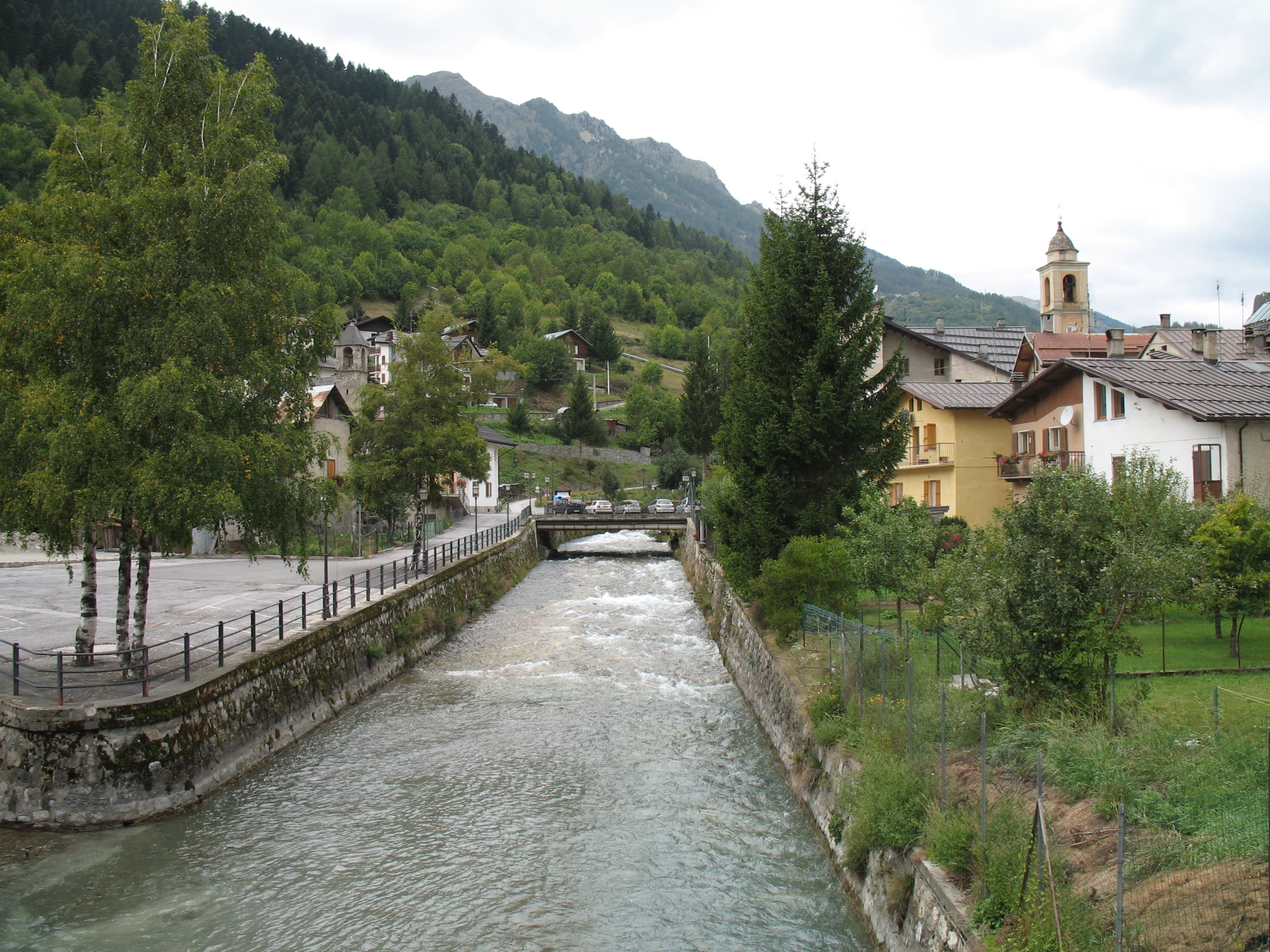
- The Stura during its Alpine stage (at Pietraporzio)

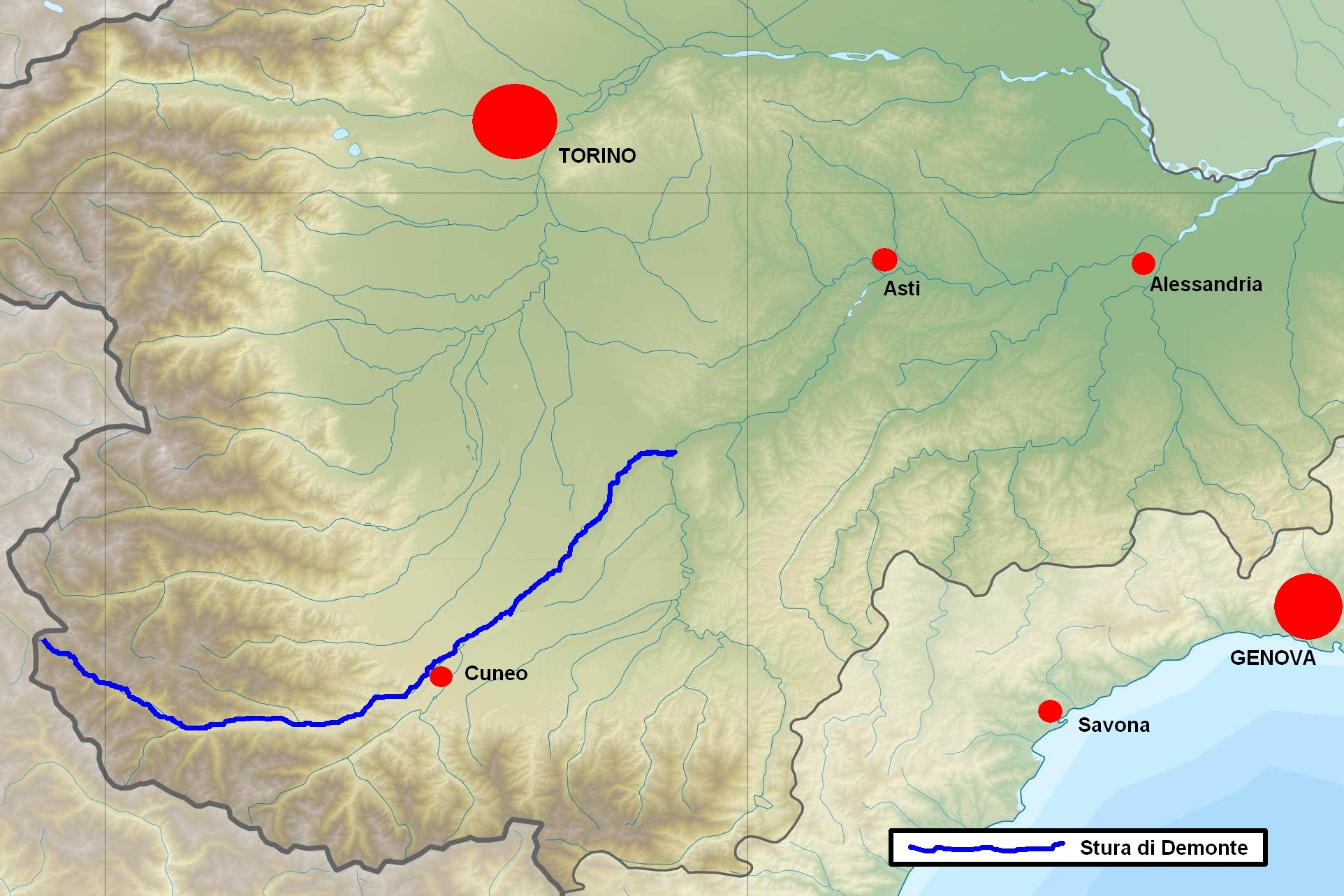
- Location within southern Piedmont

Location
- Country: Italy (Piedmont: Province of Cuneo)

Physical characteristics
- Source
  - location: Lago della Maddalena, close to the Maddalena Pass
  - elevation: 1,990 m (6,530 ft)
- Mouth
  - location: Tanaro, near Cherasco
  - coordinates: 44.6512°N 7.8812°E
- Length: 115 km (71 mi)
- Basin size: 1,579 square kilometres (610 mi^{2})
- Discharge
  - average: 47 cubic metres per second (1,700 cu ft/s)

Basin features
- Progression: Tanaro→ Po→ Adriatic Sea

The Stura di Demonte (Latin: Stura) is a 115-kilometre (71 mi) long river in northwestern Italy (Piedmont).

== Geography ==
The river is a tributary to the river Tanaro, which is a tributary of the river Po. Its source is in the Alps, near the border with France. It flows through Demonte and Cuneo before joining the Tanaro just east of Cherasco.

== See also ==
- Stura di Demonte Valley

== Notes ==
Media related to Stura di Demonte at Wikimedia Commons
