= Maritime Alps =

Mountain range in France and Italy

- French: Alpes Maritimes; Italian: Alpi Marittime
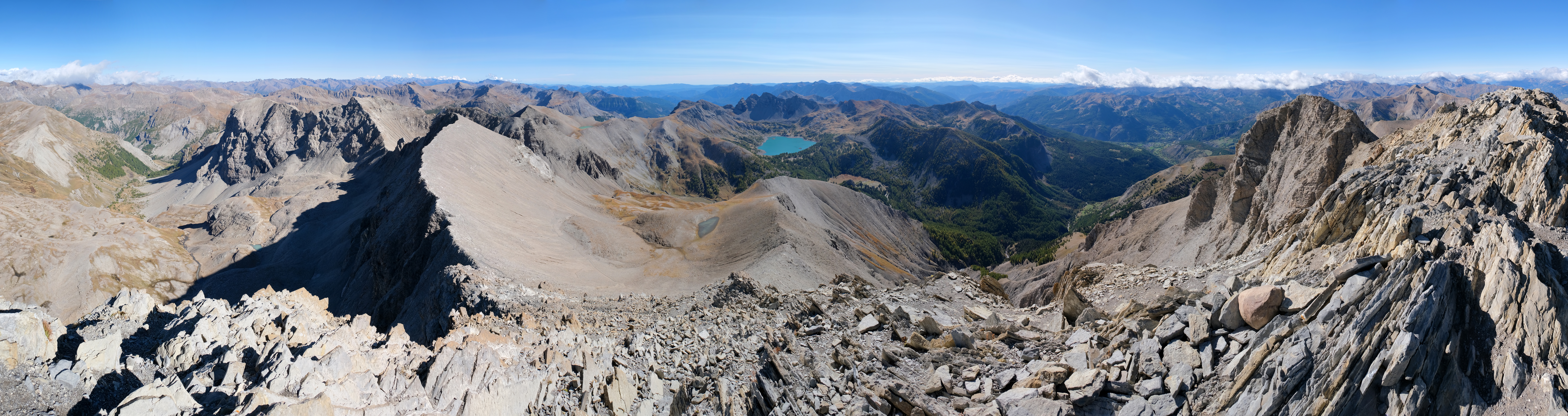
- Maritime Alps

Highest point
- Peak: Monte Argentera
- Elevation: 3,297 m (10,817 ft)
- Coordinates: 44°10′45″N 7°18′18″E

Geography
- Countries: France; Italy; Monaco
- Regions, Régions: Piedmont; Liguria; Provence-Alpes-Côte d'Azur
- Rivers: Verdon; Ubaye; Roya; Var; Stura di Demonte
- Range coordinates: 44°13.9′N 7°10.6′E
- Parent range: Alps
- Borders on: Ligurian Alps; Cottian Alps; Provence Alps and Prealps; Mediterranean Sea

Geology
- Orogeny: Alpine orogeny

The Maritime Alps (French: Alpes Maritimes [alp maʁitim]; Italian: Alpi Marittime [ˈalpi maˈrittime]) are a mountain range in the southwestern part of the Alps. They form the border between the French region of Provence-Alpes-Côte d'Azur and the Italian regions of Piedmont and Liguria. They are the southernmost part of the Alps.

== Geography ==
Administratively the range is divided between the Italian provinces of Cuneo and Imperia (eastern slopes) and the French department of Alpes-Maritimes (western slopes).

The Maritime Alps are drained by the rivers Roya, Var and Verdon and their tributaries on the French side; by the Stura di Demonte and other tributaries of the Tanaro and Po on the Italian side.

The mountain range is home to many small perched villages, such as Belvédère, located at the entrance to the Gordolasque valley. In many of these villages, churches decorated with murals and altarpieces by primitive Niçois painters can be found.

=== Borders ===
The borders of the Maritime Alps are as follows (clockwise):

- Vermenagna creek, Col de Tende - which connects them with the Ligurian Alps - and Roya (east);
- Mediterranean Sea and Var valley (south)
- Verdon, Col d'Allos - which connects them with Provence Alps and Prealps - and Ubaye (west);
- Maddalena Pass (which connects them with the Cottian Alps) and Stura di Demonte (north).

== Peaks ==
The main peaks of the Maritime Alps are:

Name	Elevation
Monte Argentera	3,297 m
Monte Stella	3,262 m
Cima Genova	3,191 m
Cime du Gélas	3,135 m
Cima di Nasta	3,108 m
Monte Matto	3,097 m
Cima del Baus	3,067 m
Mont Pelat	3,053 m
Mont Clapier	3,046 m
Mont Ténibre	3,032 m
Enciastraia	2,955 m
Mont Bégo	2,872 m
Mont Mounier	2,818 m
Roche de l'Abisse	2,755 m
Monte Grammondo	1,378 m

== Mountain passes ==
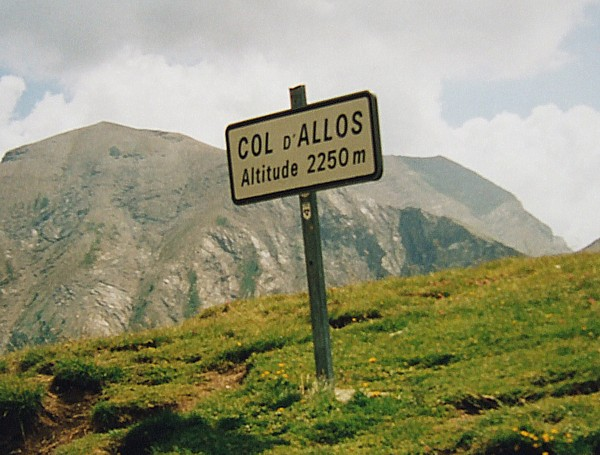
Col d'allos (2,250 m)

The chief passes of the Maritime Alps are:

Name	Location	Type	Elevation
Col de la Bonette	Tinée Valley to Barcelonnette	Road (minor loop climbs to 2,802 m)	2715
Col de Restefond	Col de la Bonette to Barcelonnette	Road	2680
Bassa di Druos	Tinée Valley to Terme di Valdieri	Bridle path	2630
Colle di Ciriegia	Saint-Martin-Vésubie to Terme di Valdieri	Bridle path	2551
Col des Granges Communes	Saint-Étienne-de-Tinée to Barcelonnette	Bridle path	2512
Col de Pourriac	Tinee Valley to Argentera	Footpath	2506
Colle di Guercia	Tinee Valley to Vinadio	Footpath	2451
Col de la Lombarde	Isola to Vinadio	Road	2350
Col de la Cayolle	Var River valley to Barcelonnette	Road	2327
Col du Sabion	Tende to Valdieri	Bridle path	2264
Col d'Allos	Verdon River valley to Barcelonnette	Road	2250
Maddalena Pass	Barcelonnette to Cuneo	Road	1995
Col de Tende	Tende to Cuneo	Road, road tunnel Railway tunnel	1873
Col de Turini	Vésubie river valley to Sospel	Road	1607

== Nature conservation ==
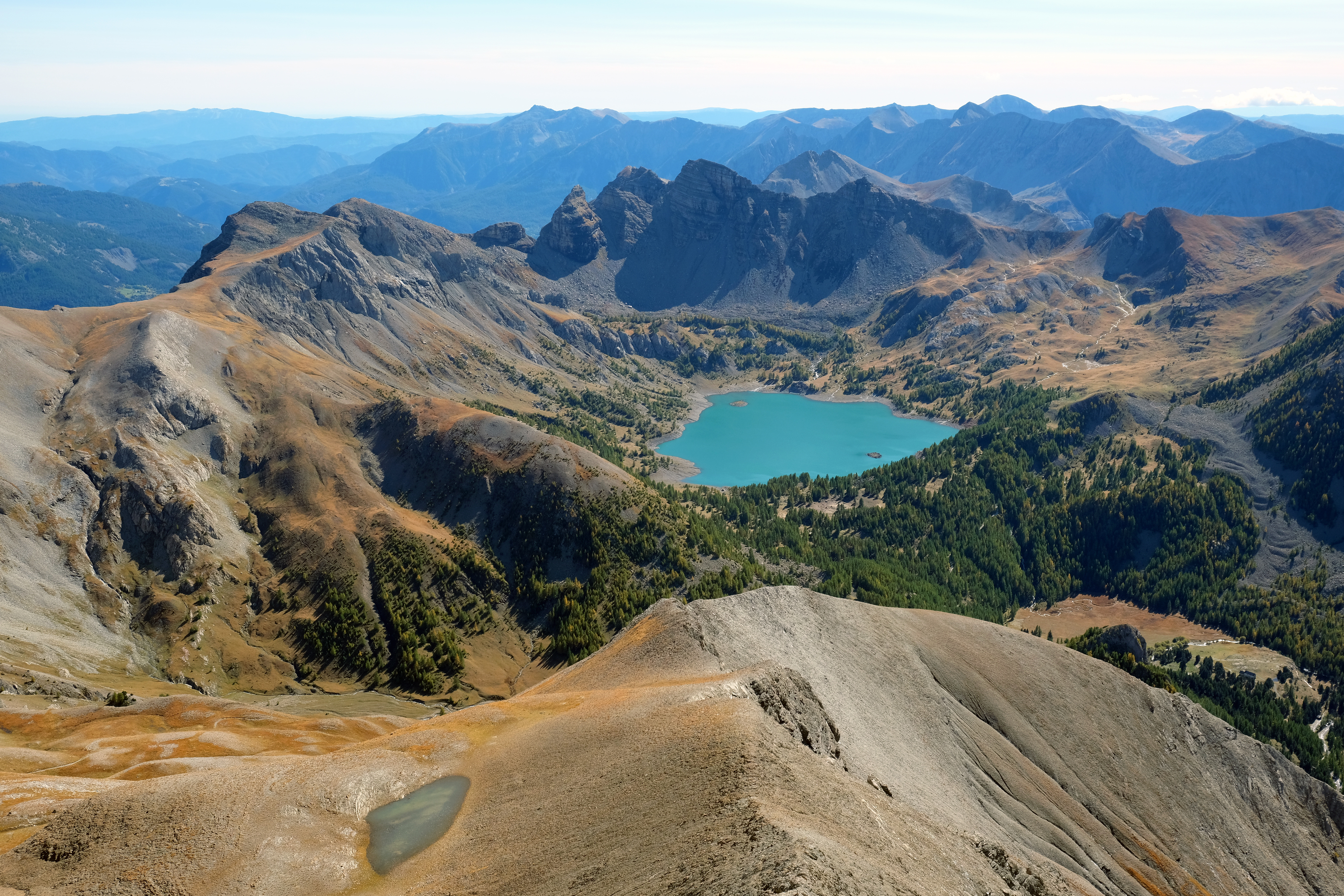
Mercantour National Park

The French Mercantour National Park (central area:68,500 ha + peripheral area:140,000 ha) is part of the Maritime Alps as well as the Maritime Alps Natural Park, an Italian regional nature park of 28,455 ha.

== Maps ==
- Italian official cartography (Istituto Geografico Militare - IGM); on-line version: www.pcn.minambiente.it
- French official cartography (Institut Géographique National - IGN); on-line version: www.geoportail.fr
