= Borgo San Dalmazzo =

- Comune
- Città di Borgo San Dalmazzo
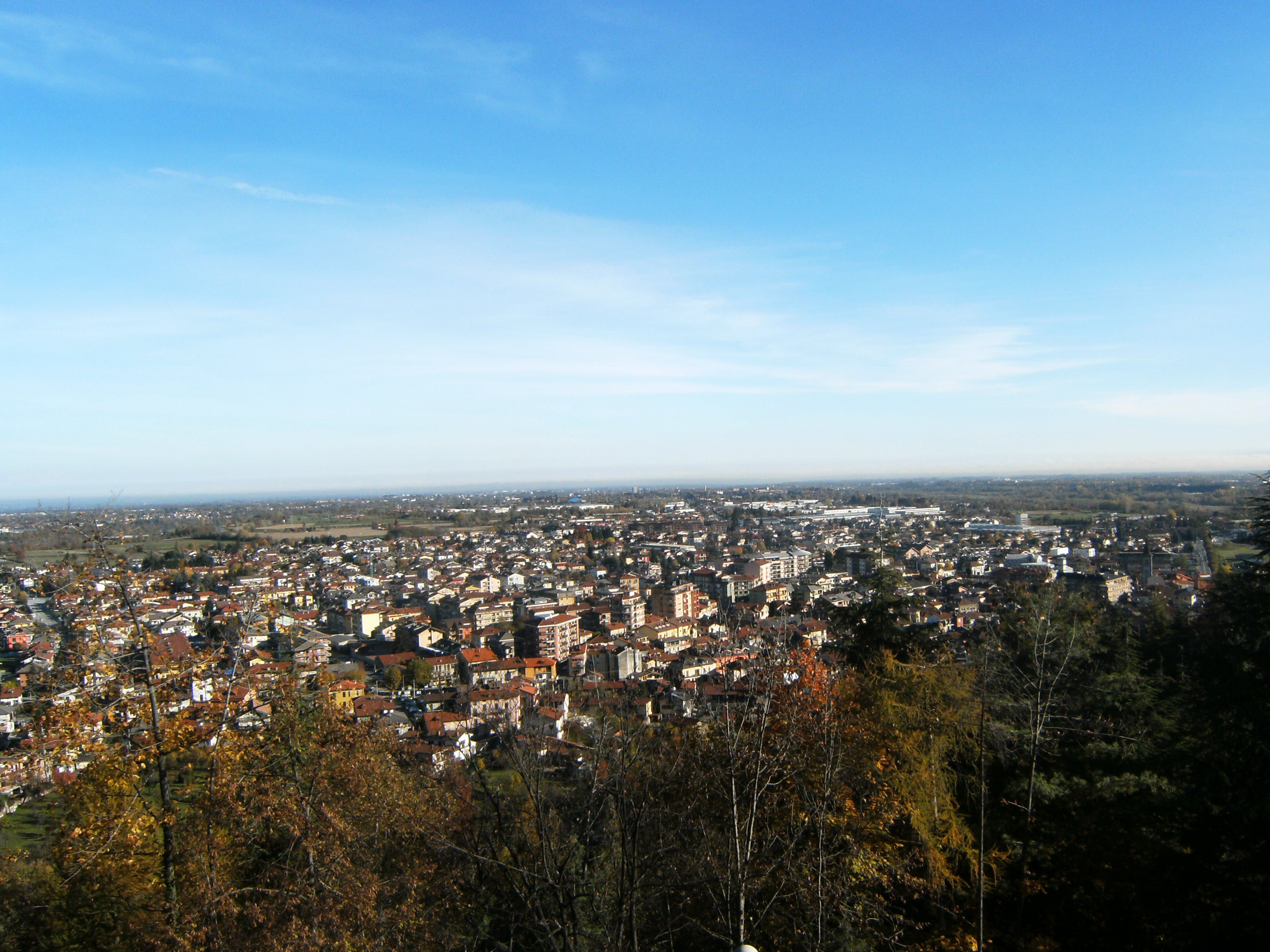

- Coat of arms

- Location within Italy Location within Piedmont
- Coordinates: 44°20′N 7°29′E
- Country: Italy
- Region: Piedmont
- Province: Cuneo (CN)
- Frazioni: Beguda, Madonna Bruna, Sant'Antonio Aradolo

Government
  - Mayor: Gianpaolo Beretta (centre-left)

Area 636
  - Total: 22.2 km^{2} (8.6 sq mi)
- Elevation: 636 m (2,087 ft)

Population (30 November 2017)
  - Total: 12,448
  - Density: 561/km^{2} (1,450/sq mi)
- Demonym: Borgarini
- Time zone: UTC+1 (CET)
  - Summer (DST): UTC+2 (CEST)
- Postal code: 12011
- Dialing code: 0171
- Patron saint: St. Dalmatius of Pavia
- Saint day: 5 December
- Website: Official website

Borgo San Dalmazzo (Occitan: Lo Borg Sant Dalmatz) is a comune (municipality) in the Province of Cuneo in the Italian region Piedmont, located about 80 kilometres (50 mi) south of Turin and about 8 kilometres (5 mi) southwest of Cuneo.

Borgo San Dalmazzo takes its name from Saint Dalmatius of Pavia. Sights include the parish church of San Dalmazzo (11th century).

Borgo San Dalmazzo borders the following municipalities: Boves, Cuneo, Gaiola, Moiola, Roccasparvera, Roccavione, Valdieri, and Vignolo.

The Nazi and Italian Social Republic regimes established and operated the Borgo San Dalmazzo concentration camp during the Second World War. At Borgo, approximately 375 Jewish Italians (from Cuneo, Saluzzo, Mondovì and other nearby communes) and 349 Jewish refugees from other countries were imprisoned and eventually deported to Auschwitz and other Nazi extermination camps.

== Twin towns – sister cities ==
Borgo San Dalmazzo is twinned with:

- Breil-sur-Roya, France
- La Vega, Dominican Republic
- Valdeblore, France
