= Aisone =

Aisone Aison
- Comune
- Comune di Aisone
- Coat of arms

- Location within Italy Location within Piedmont
- Coordinates: 44°19′N 7°13′E
- Country: Italy
- Region: Piedmont
- Province: Province of Cuneo (CN)

Government
  - Mayor: Marisa Rondolino

Area
  - Total: 36.7 km^{2} (14.2 sq mi)
- Elevation: 834 m (2,736 ft)

Population (Dec. 2004)
  - Total: 269
  - Density: 7.33/km^{2} (19.0/sq mi)
- Time zone: UTC+1 (CET)
  - Summer (DST): UTC+2 (CEST)
- Postal code: 12010
- Dialing code: 0171

Aisone is a comune (municipality) in the Province of Cuneo in the Italian region Piedmont, located about 90 kilometres (56 mi) southwest of Turin and about 30 kilometres (19 mi) southwest of Cuneo. As of 31 December 2004, it had a population of 269 and an area of 36.7 square kilometres (14.2 mi^{2}). The mayor is Marisa Rondolino. Aisone borders the following municipalities: Demonte, Valdieri, and Vinadio.

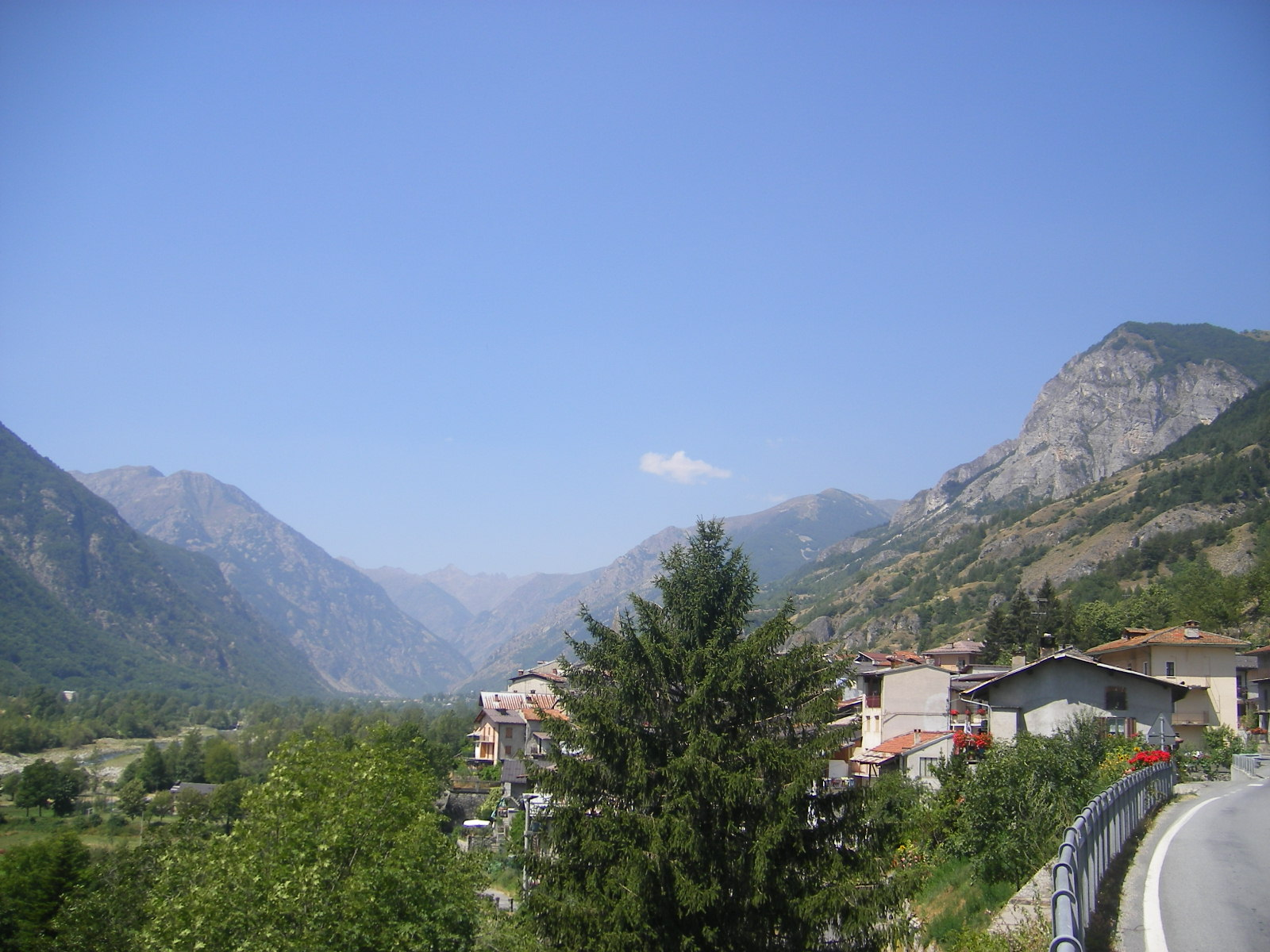
Aisone (2007)

== Demographic evolution ==
Historical population

Year	Pop.	±%
1861	1,232	—
1871	1,462	+18.7%
1881	1,428	−2.3%
1901	1,156	−19.0%
1911	1,026	−11.2%

Year	Pop.	±%
1921	1,119	+9.1%
1931	842	−24.8%
1936	612	−27.3%
1951	564	−7.8%
1961	480	−14.9%

Year	Pop.	±%
1971	383	−20.2%
1981	326	−14.9%
1991	309	−5.2%
2001	257	−16.8%

Source: Data from ISTAT
