= Demonte =

- Comune
- Comune di Demonte
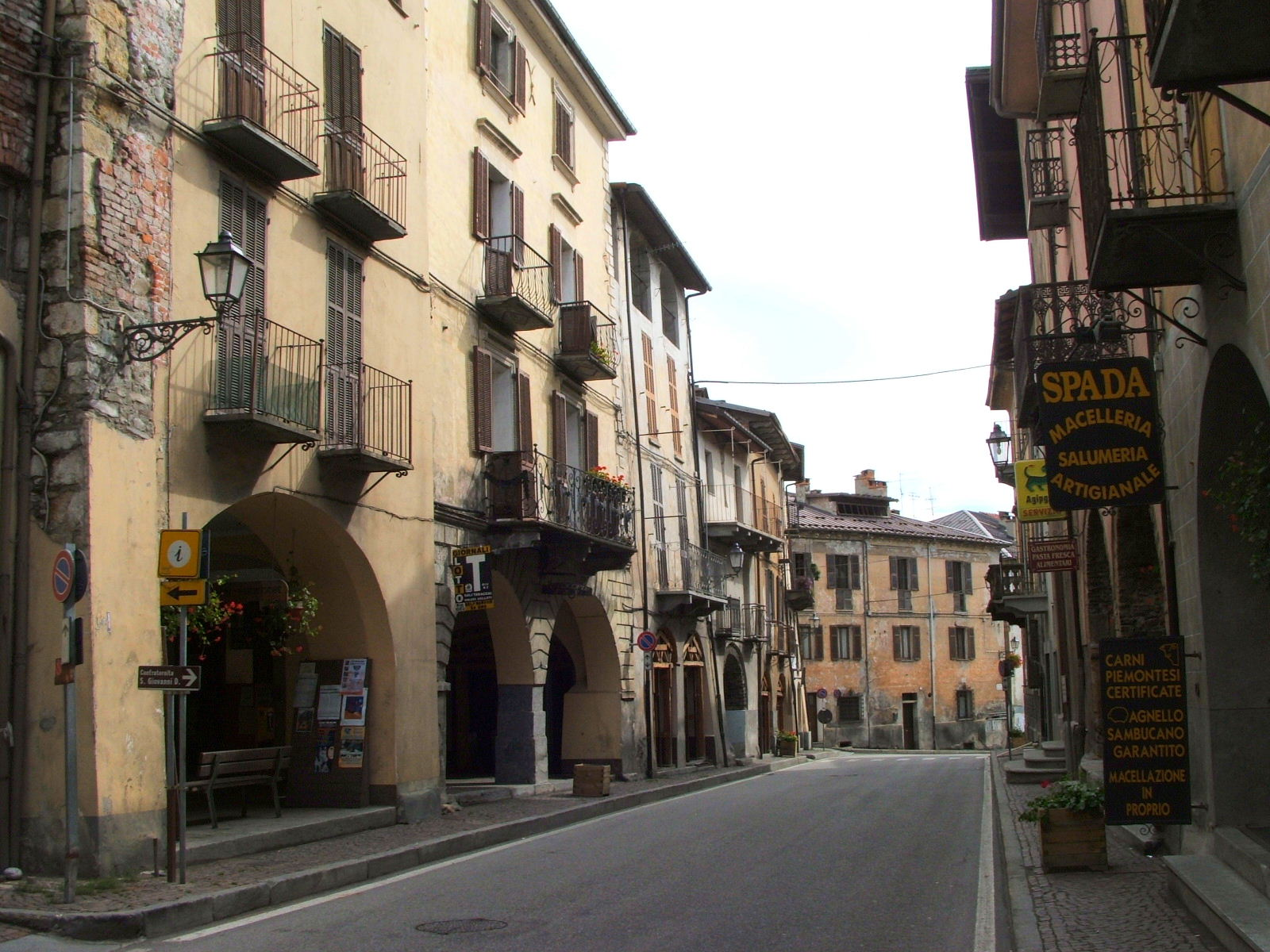

- Coat of arms

- Location within Italy Location within Piedmont
- Coordinates: 44°19′N 7°18′E
- Country: Italy
- Region: Piedmont
- Province: Cuneo (CN)

Government
  - Mayor: Mario Claudio Bertoldi

Area
  - Total: 127.6 km^{2} (49.3 sq mi)
- Elevation: 780 m (2,560 ft)

Population (31 August 2007)
  - Total: 2,042
  - Density: 16.00/km^{2} (41.45/sq mi)
- Demonym: Demontesi
- Time zone: UTC+1 (CET)
  - Summer (DST): UTC+2 (CEST)
- Postal code: 12014
- Dialing code: 0171
- Patron saint: San Donato
- Website: Official website

Demonte is a comune (municipality) in the Province of Cuneo in the Italian region Piedmont, located about 90 kilometres (56 mi) southwest of Turin and about 20 kilometres (12 mi) southwest of Cuneo, in the Valle Stura di Demonte.

Demonte borders the following municipalities: Aisone, Castelmagno, Marmora, Moiola, Monterosso Grana, Pradleves, Sambuco, Valdieri, Valloriate, and Vinadio.

The family name Demonte means "On the Mountain".

The 15th-century Italian fresco artist Giovanni Baleison was born in Demonte.

== See also ==
- Colle Fauniera
- Demonte Harper (born 1989), American basketball player in the Israeli Basketball Premier League
