= Gaiola =

- Comune
- Comune di Gaiola
- Coat of arms

- Location within Italy Location within Piedmont
- Coordinates: 44°20′N 7°24′E
- Country: Italy
- Region: Piedmont
- Province: Cuneo (CN)

Government
  - Mayor: Alessia Bruno

Area
  - Total: 5.0 km^{2} (1.9 sq mi)
- Elevation: 692 m (2,270 ft)

Population (31 December 2010)
  - Total: 592
  - Density: 120/km^{2} (310/sq mi)
- Demonym: Gaiolesi
- Time zone: UTC+1 (CET)
  - Summer (DST): UTC+2 (CEST)
- Postal code: 12010
- Dialing code: 0171

Gaiola is a comune (municipality) in the Province of Cuneo in the Italian region Piedmont, located about 80 kilometres (50 mi) southwest of Turin and about 13 kilometres (8 mi) southwest of Cuneo.

Gaiola borders the following municipalities: Borgo San Dalmazzo, Moiola, Rittana, Roccasparvera, and Valloriate.
