= Moiola =

Moiola Moiòla
- Comune
- Comune di Moiola
- Coat of arms

- Location within Italy Location within Piedmont
- Coordinates: 44°19′N 7°23′E
- Country: Italy
- Region: Piedmont
- Province: Cuneo (CN)

Government
  - Mayor: Flavio Girodengo

Area
  - Total: 14.9 km^{2} (5.8 sq mi)
- Elevation: 689 m (2,260 ft)

Population (31 December 2010)
  - Total: 272
  - Density: 18.3/km^{2} (47.3/sq mi)
- Demonym: Moiolesi
- Time zone: UTC+1 (CET)
  - Summer (DST): UTC+2 (CEST)
- Postal code: 12010
- Dialing code: 0171

Moiola is a comune (municipality) in the Province of Cuneo in the Italian region Piedmont, located about 90 kilometres (56 mi) southwest of Turin and about 15 kilometres (9 mi) southwest of Cuneo.

Moiola borders the following municipalities: Borgo San Dalmazzo, Demonte, Gaiola, Valdieri, and Valloriate.

From 1928 to 1946 it was merged with Gaiola.
