= Rittana =

- Comune
- Comune di Rittana
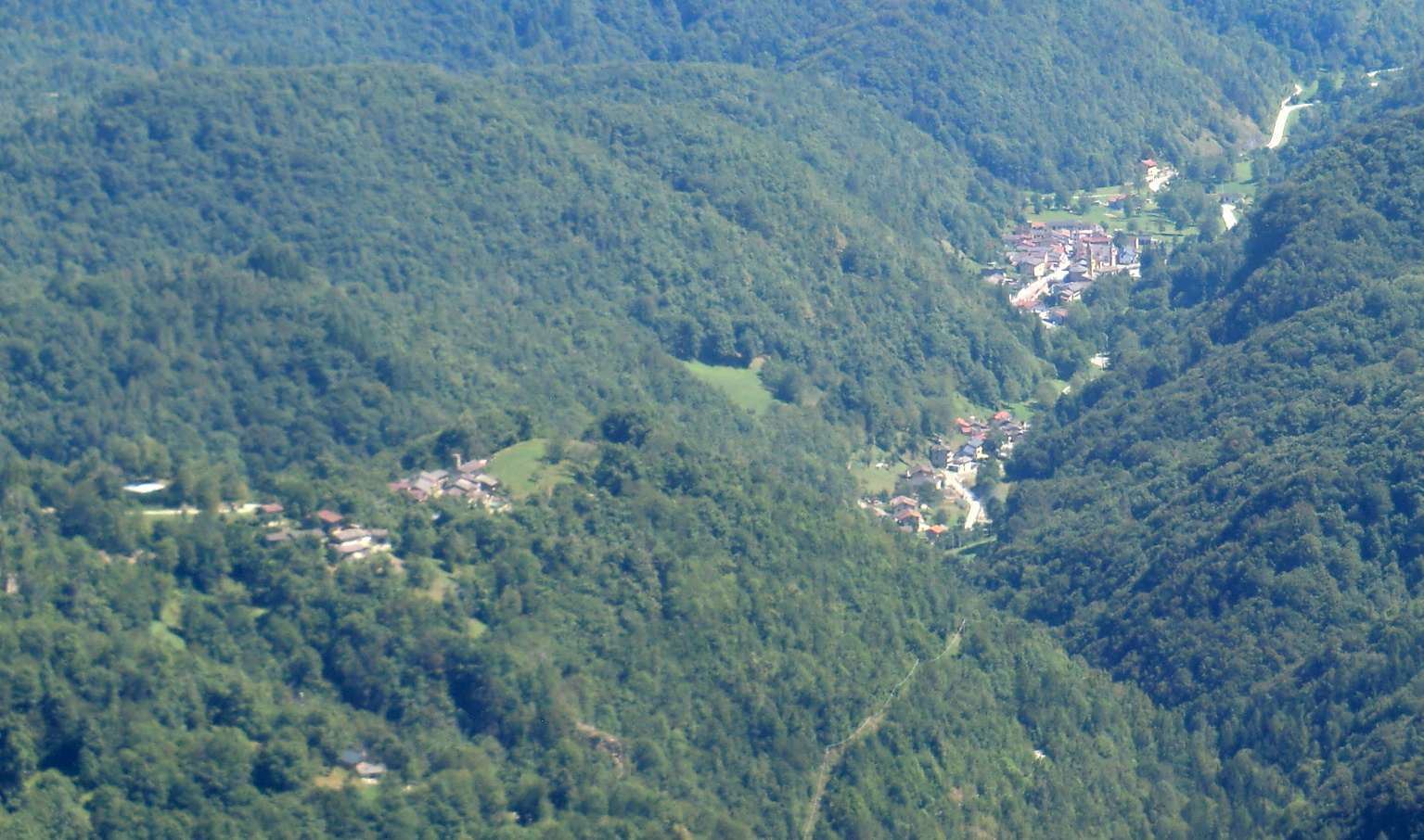

- Coat of arms

- Location within Italy Location within Piedmont
- Coordinates: 44°21′N 7°24′E
- Country: Italy
- Region: Piedmont
- Province: Cuneo (CN)

Government
  - Mayor: Walter Cesana

Area
  - Total: 11.4 km^{2} (4.4 sq mi)
- Elevation: 753 m (2,470 ft)

Population (31 December 2010)
  - Total: 140
  - Density: 12/km^{2} (32/sq mi)
- Demonym: Rittanesi
- Time zone: UTC+1 (CET)
  - Summer (DST): UTC+2 (CEST)
- Postal code: 12010
- Dialing code: 0171

Rittana is a comune (municipality) in the Province of Cuneo in the Italian region Piedmont, located about 80 kilometres (50 mi) southwest of Turin and about 13 kilometres (8 mi) southwest of Cuneo.

Rittana borders the following municipalities: Bernezzo, Gaiola, Monterosso Grana, Roccasparvera, Valgrana, and Valloriate.
