= Valloriate =

- Comune
- Comune di Valloriate
- Coat of arms

- Location within Italy Location within Piedmont
- Coordinates: 44°20′N 7°22′E
- Country: Italy
- Region: Piedmont
- Province: Cuneo (CN)

Government
  - Mayor: Gianluca Monaco

Area
  - Total: 16.9 km^{2} (6.5 sq mi)
- Elevation: 796 m (2,612 ft)

Population (31 December 2010)
  - Total: 126
  - Density: 7.46/km^{2} (19.3/sq mi)
- Time zone: UTC+1 (CET)
  - Summer (DST): UTC+2 (CEST)
- Postal code: 12010
- Dialing code: 0171

Valloriate is a comune (municipality) in the Province of Cuneo in the Italian region Piedmont, located about 90 kilometres (56 mi) southwest of Turin and about 15 kilometres (9 mi) southwest of Cuneo.

Valloriate borders the following municipalities: Demonte, Gaiola, Moiola, Monterosso Grana, and Rittana.
