= Lago del Chiotas =

Lake in Piedmont, Italy

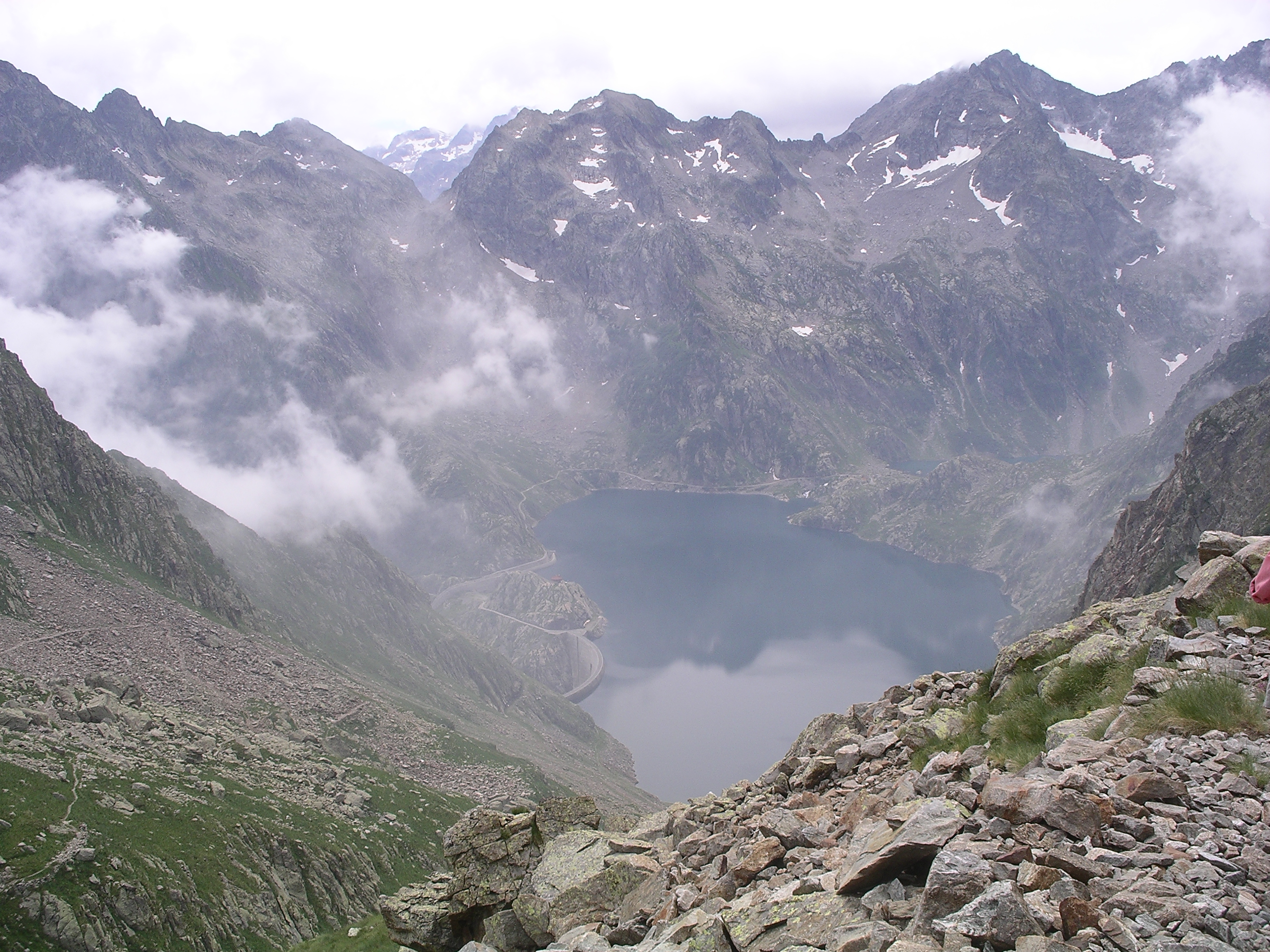

- Location within Piedmont
- Location: Province of Cuneo, Piedmont
- Coordinates: 44.167°N 7.331°E
- Basin countries: Italy
- Water volume: 27,300,000 m^{3} (22,100 acre⋅ft)
- Surface elevation: 1,978 m (6,490 ft)

Lago del Chiotas is a lake in the Province of Cuneo, Piedmont, Italy. It is used as an upper reservoir for the pumped-storage hydroelectric Entracque Power Plant.

== See also ==
- Lake Vej del Bouc
