= Monte Argentera =

Mountain in Italy

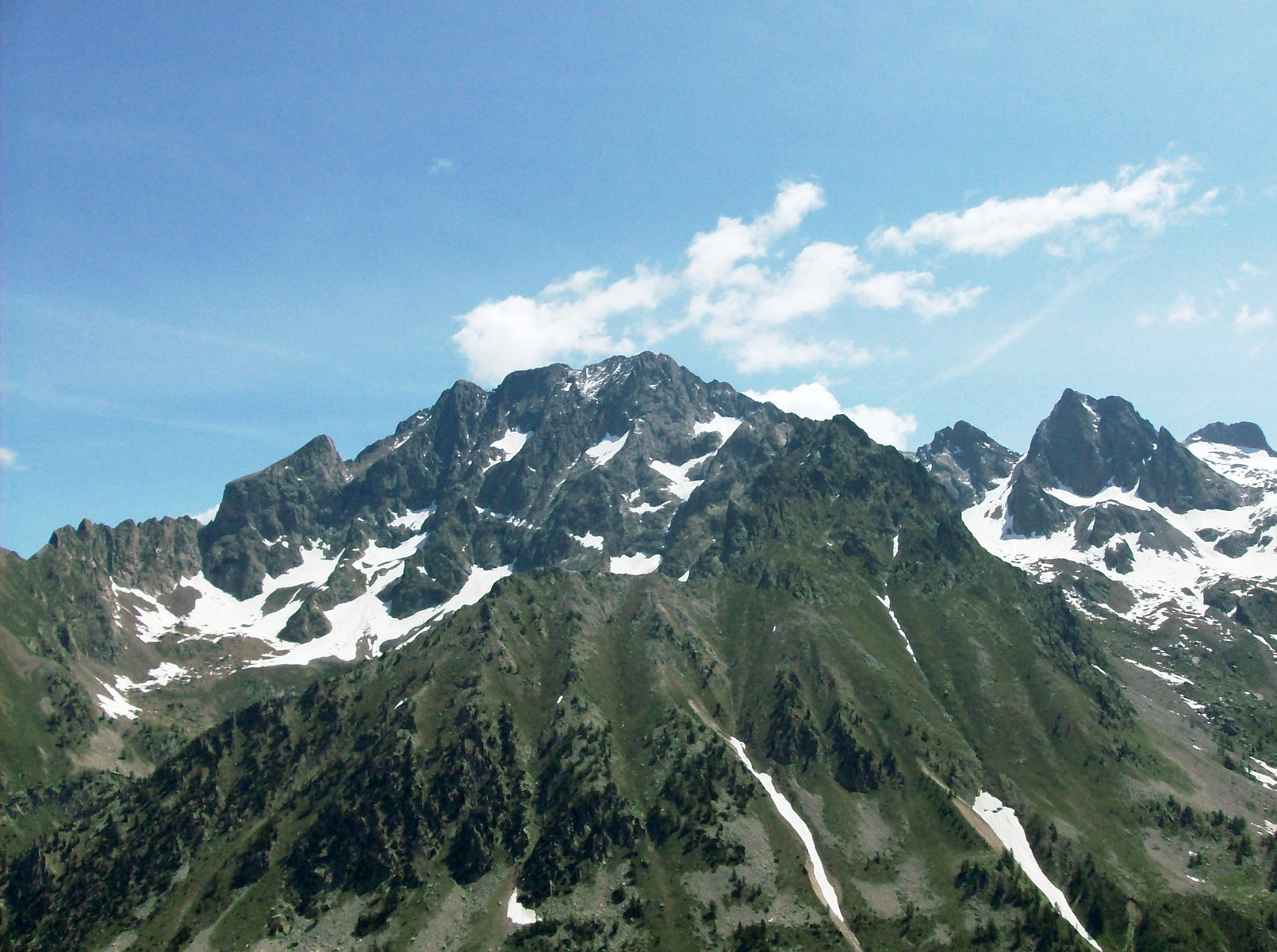
- The Monte Argentera ridge from the Corno Stella to the Cima di Nasta.

Highest point
- Elevation: 3,297 m (10,817 ft)
- Prominence: 1,301 m (4,268 ft)
- Isolation: 53.03 km (32.95 mi)
- Listing: Alpine mountains above 3000 m
- Coordinates: 44°10′40″N 7°18′20″E

Geography
- Location within Alps
- Location: Piedmont, Italy
- Parent range: Maritime Alps

Climbing
- First ascent: William Auguste Coolidge, Christian Almer father and son

Monte Argentera is a mountain in the Maritime Alps, in the province of Cuneo, Piedmont, northern Italy. With an elevation of 3,297 metres (10,817 ft), it is the highest peak in the range, especially the Mercantour-Argentera massif.

The peak is located in the upper Valle Gesso, on the boundary between the municipalities of Entracque and Valdieri. Geologically, it is formed by gneiss of various composition, with local outcrops of granite.

== SOIUSA classification ==
According to the SOIUSA (International Standardized Mountain Subdivision of the Alps) the mountain can be classified in the following way:

- main part = Western Alps
- major sector = South Western Alps
- section = Maritime Alps
- subsection = Alpi Marittime
- supergroup = Catena Argentera-Pépoiri-Matto
- group = Gruppo dell'Argentera
- subgroup = Massiccio dell'Argentera
- code = I/A-2.1-B.6.a

== Sources ==
- Villani, Nanni (April 2002). Monte Argentera, tre metri sotto i tremila e trecento, in Piemonte Parchi - speciale Cime Tempestose. Regione Piemonte.
