= Entracque =

- Comune
- Comune di Entracque
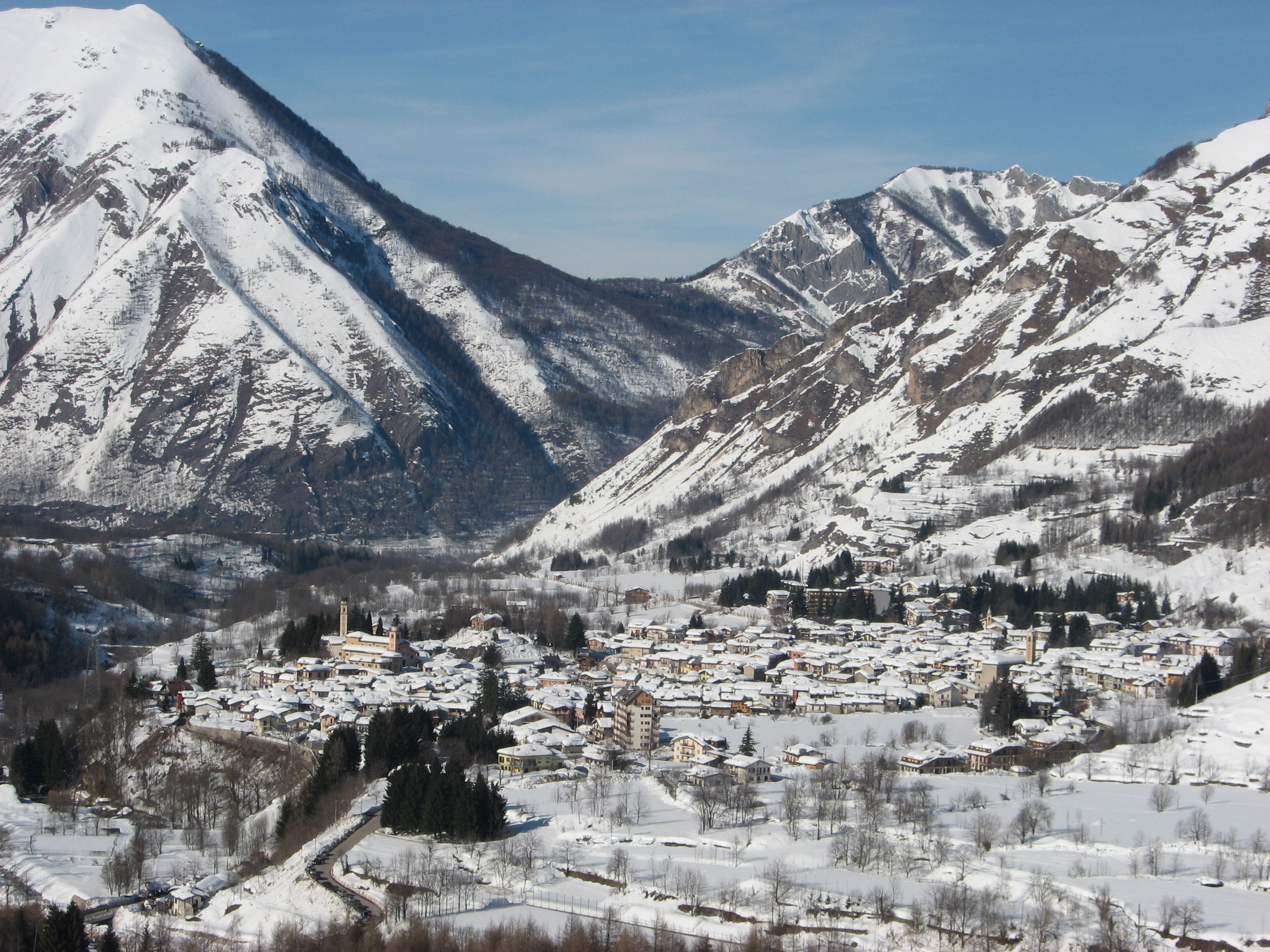

- Coat of arms

- Location within Italy Location within Piedmont
- Coordinates: 44°15′N 7°24′E
- Country: Italy
- Region: Piedmont
- Province: Cuneo (CN)

Government
  - Mayor: Roberto Gosso

Area
  - Total: 159.9 km^{2} (61.7 sq mi)
- Elevation: 894 m (2,933 ft)
- Highest elevation: 3,297 m (10,817 ft)
- Lowest elevation: 792 m (2,598 ft)

Population (31 July 2010)
  - Total: 857
  - Density: 5.36/km^{2} (13.9/sq mi)
- Demonym: Entracquesi
- Time zone: UTC+1 (CET)
  - Summer (DST): UTC+2 (CEST)
- Postal code: 12010
- Dialing code: 0171
- Website: Official website

Entracque is a small town in the Valle Gesso of the Maritime Alps of north-west Italy, about 20 kilometres (12 mi) southwest of Cuneo and close to the French border. It is the principal settlement and capoluogo of the comune or municipality of the same name (population 855) in the Piedmontese Province of Cuneo.

At the time of the 2001 census over 90 percent of the then 848 inhabitants of the comune were found in Entracque itself. The remaining 68 were dispersed among 11 hamlets, none of which had more than 13 inhabitants, or lived in isolated dwellings.

Entracque borders the following municipalities: Belvédère (France), La Brigue (France), Limone Piemonte, Roaschia, Saint-Martin-Vésubie (France), Valdieri, and Vernante.

The comune is the site of the Entracque Power Plant, one of the biggest hydroelectric power stations in Italy.

== Tourism ==
Entracque started to be a mountain touristic resort in the late 19th century, when the house of Savoy used the valley as a game reserve. Today Entracque addresses both winter and summer tourism. It has one of the biggest Italian cross ski areas and also has two lifts for alpine skiing.

=== Natural Park of the Maritime Alps ===
The village is also part of the Parco Naturale delle Alpi Marittime (Natural Park of the Maritime Alps). It is one of the few pan-European parks (the French side is the National Park of Mercantour).

Monte Argentera, the highest peak in the Maritime Alps, is located in the municipal territory.

== See also ==
- Lake Vej del Bouc
