= Valdieri =

- Comune
- Comune di Valdieri
- Coat of arms

- Location within Italy Location within Piedmont
- Coordinates: 44°17′N 7°24′E
- Country: Italy
- Region: Piedmont
- Province: Cuneo (CN)
- Frazioni: Andonno, S. Anna di Valdieri, Terme di Valdieri

Government
  - Mayor: Giacomo Luigi Gaiotti

Area
  - Total: 153.32 km^{2} (59.20 sq mi)
- Elevation: 774 m (2,539 ft)

Population (31 December 2010)
  - Total: 949
  - Density: 6.19/km^{2} (16.0/sq mi)
- Demonym: Valdieresi
- Time zone: UTC+1 (CET)
  - Summer (DST): UTC+2 (CEST)
- Postal code: 12010
- Dialing code: 0171
- Website: Official website

Valdieri is a comune (municipality) in the Province of Cuneo in the Italian region Piedmont, located about 90 kilometres (56 mi) southwest of Turin and about 15 kilometres (9 mi) southwest of Cuneo, on the border with France. It is part of the Valle Gesso.

Valdieri borders the following municipalities: Aisone, Borgo San Dalmazzo, Demonte, Entracque, Isola (France), Moiola, Roaschia, Roccavione, Saint-Martin-Vésubie (France), Valdeblore (France), and Vinadio.

== Main sights ==
- Monte Argentera, the highest peak in the Maritime Alps.
- Giardino Botanico Alpino Valderia
