= Roccavione =

Roccavione Rocavion
- Comune
- Comune di Roccavione
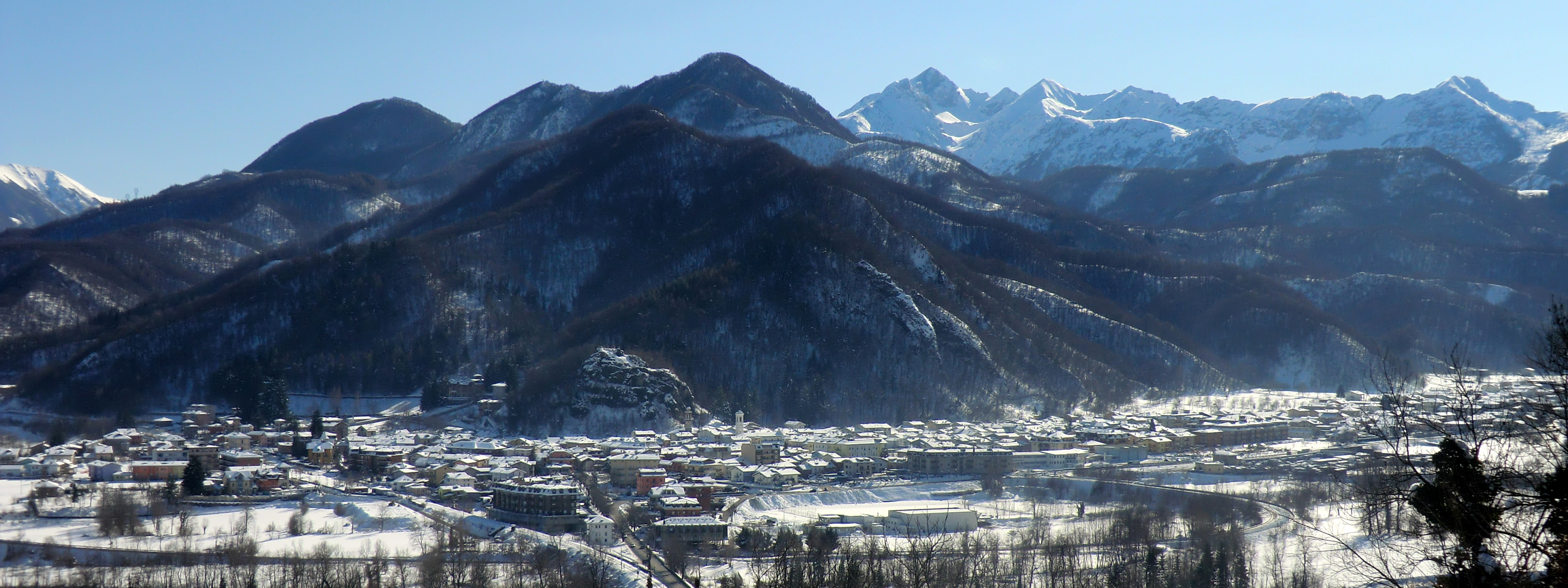
- Panorama of Roccavione

- Coat of arms

- Location within Italy Location within Piedmont
- Coordinates: 44°19′N 7°29′E
- Country: Italy
- Region: Piedmont
- Province: Cuneo (CN)
- Frazioni: Brignola, Tetto Parachetto, Tetto Piano, Tetto nuovo, Tetto Cherro, Tetto Sales, Tetto Ghigo, Tetto Giordana

Government
  - Mayor: Germana Avena

Area
  - Total: 19.6 km^{2} (7.6 sq mi)

Population (31 May 2008)
  - Total: 2,885
  - Density: 147/km^{2} (381/sq mi)
- Demonym: Roccavionesi
- Time zone: UTC+1 (CET)
  - Summer (DST): UTC+2 (CEST)
- Postal code: 12018
- Dialing code: 0171

Roccavione is a comune (municipality) in the Province of Cuneo in the Italian region Piedmont, located about 90 kilometres (56 mi) south of Turin and about 9 kilometres (6 mi) southwest of Cuneo.

Located in the Valle Vermenagna, it is also known as "the Alps' gate".
