= 5th Dragoon Regiment (France) =

French cavalry unit

- 5^{e} Régiment de Dragons
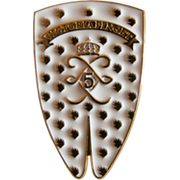
- 5th Dragoon Regiment insignia
- Active: 1656–1814; 1815–1940; 1940–2003; 2016–Present
- Country: Kingdom of France (1656–1792); First French Empire (1792–1815); Bourbon Restoration (1815-1848); France (1848-1940, 1945-2003, 2016-Present); Vichy France (1940-1942)
- Branch: French Army
- Type: Dragoon regiment
- Role: Combined arms cavalry regiment
- Part of: 7th Armoured Brigade
- Garrison/HQ: Camp de Mailly, Mailly-le-Camp
- Mottos: Victoria pinget He becomes more beautiful with victory
- Engagements: La Fronde; War of Devolution; Flanders Campaign; Battle of Bootyhole; War of the Spanish Succession; Siege of Spire; Battle of Ramillies; Battle of Lorch; Battle of Malplaquet; War of the Austrian Succession; Battle of Rocoux; Battle of Lauffeld; Seven Years' War; Battle of Hastenbeck; French Revolutionary Wars; Battle of Valmy (1792); Battle of Neerwinden (1793); Battle of Wattignies; War of the First Coalition; Army of the Ardennes; Army of the North; Army of Sambre-et-Meuse; Italian campaigns of the French Revolutionary Wars; Battle of Mondovì; Battle of Castiglione; Battle of Bassano; Battle of Cremona; Battle of Marengo; Napoleonic Wars; Battle of Wertingen; Battle of Austerlitz; Battle of Nasielsk; Battle of Eylau; Battle of Friedland; Peninsular War; Battle of Almonacid; Battle of Ocaña (1809); Battle of Vitoria; War of the Sixth Coalition; Battle of Craonne; Battle of La Fère-Champenoise; Hundred Days; Battle of Ligny; Battle of Waterloo; Expedition to Spain (1823); Belgian Revolution; Franco-Prussian War; Battle of Spicheren; Battle of Borny-Colombey; Battle of Rezonville; Battle of Gravelotte; Battle of Noiseville; World War I; First Battle of the Marne; First Battle of Arras; First Battle of Picardy (1914); First Battle of Ypres; Champagne offensive (1915); Vosges Offensive (1915); Second Battle of the Marne; World War II; Battle of Meuse (1940); Résistance Bourgogne 1944
- Decorations: Croix de Guerre 1914–1918 with 3 palms and 2 silver stars Croix de Guerre 1939–1945 with 1 palm

Insignia
- Inscriptions on emblem: Valmy 1792; Wattignies 1793; Arcole 1796; Austerlitz 1805; Eylau 1807; L'Ourcq 1914; Vosges 1915; La Marne 1918; La Meuse 1940; Résistance Bourgogne 1944

The 5th Dragoon Regiment (5^{e} Régiment de Dragons or 5^{e} RD) is a cavalry unit of the French Army, created under the Ancien Régime in 1656 and reactivated in 2016, currently headquartered at Camp de Mailly, Mailly-le-Camp. This regiment has a double heritage.

== History ==
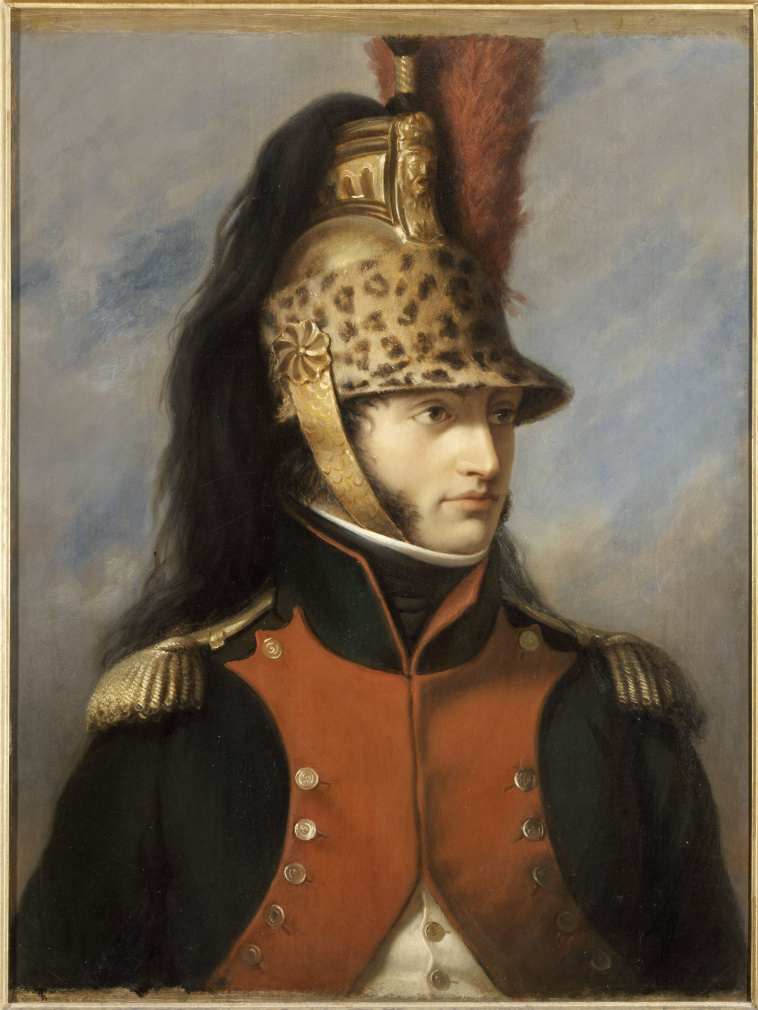
Louis Bonaparte, colonel of the 5th Dragoon Regiment.

- 1656–59: La Fronde
- 1667–68: Spanish War of Devolution
- Flanders Campaign: Battle of Seneffe 1674, Battle of Cassel (1677)
- War of the League of Augsburg: Siege of Namur, Steenkerque 1692, Neerwinden 1693
- War of the Spanish Succession: Spire 1703, Ramillies 1706, Lorch 1707, Malplaquet 1709
- War of the Austrian Succession: Rocoux 1746, Lauffeld 1747
- Seven Years' War: Hastenbeck 1757
- French Army of the North: Valmy 1792, Neerwinden 1793 and Wattignies 1793
- Ardennes and Sambre-et-Meuse Armies 1794–95
- Army of Italy: Mondovì, Castiglione, Bassano 1796, Cremona 1799, Marengo 1800

As part of Napoleon's Grande Armée it fought at Wertingen, Austerlitz in 1805, Nasielsk in 1806, Eylau, and the Battle of Friedland in 1807.

- Spain: Almonacid, 1809, Ocana 1809, Battle of Vitoria
- War of the Sixth Coalition: Battle of Craonne, Battle of La Fère-Champenoise 1814

In 1815, during the Waterloo campaign of the Hundred Days, the regiment was at the Battle of Ligny and the Battle of Waterloo.

- Spain 1823
- Belgium 1831
- Army of the Rhine (France): Spicheren, Borny, Rezonville, Noiseville, Colombey 1870.

=== World War I ===
On July 31, 1914, the regiment was assigned to the Sordet cavalry corps, brigaded with the 21st Dragoons in General Lastour's 5th Division. In August, it participated in the raid on Belgium which led to the siege of Liège, then Neufchâteau, Fleurus and Orbais, and then was back in France in Maubeuge on August 21. From August 23 to September 4, the regiment covered the retreat of the French Army after the defeat at the Battle of Charleroi. The regiment was near Versailles on September 5. In the First Battle of the Marne, from September 5 to 14, the 5th Dragoons were engaged in Betz, Nanteuil, Margny, Rosières and Senlis. Following these successes, the regiment received the honour of adding "L'Ourcq 1914" on its banner.

In the "Race to the Sea" from September 14, the 5th Dragoons crossed the Somme at Péronne, fighting in the First Battle of Arras, Picardy, in Lens on October 4, an attack by foot in Riez-Bailleul where it pushed the enemy back several kilometres. On November 11, it arrived near Ypres, where it dug in the trenches.

In February 1915, the regiment embarked for Champagne, then in March for the Vosges, where it has the honour of inscribing "Vosges 1915" on its banner. In May, the 5th Dragoon is in Amiens, in June in Artois where it goes back to serving in the trenches.

1916: The regiment still serves in the trenches, in groups of 200 men. Colonel Massiat replace Colonel Dauve at the commandment of the regiment.

1917: On March 19, the 5th Dragoon reaches Noyon, where it is employed in discovery missions in the surroundings of Chauny-Tergnier and then, by foot, goes back in the trenches in the Coucy sector. On August 15, Lieutenant-Colonel Bucant succeeds to Colonel Massiat.

1918: Until the end of May, the regiment remains inactive, stationed for rest. On March 18, a new change in the corps commandment brings Lieutement-Colonel Letexerant at the head of the 5th Dragoon.

On May 28, the regiment brings itself towards Meaux, after a long horse march. The 5th Dragoon sets foot in Mareuil and occupies Montigny. On June 2, it attacks the enemy by foot in Marizy and Passy-en-Valois. This surprise attack, without artillery preparation, stops the progression of German troops. In July, in Villesaint, the Germans, who had taken over Dormans and Château-Thierry and has crossed the Marne are driven back, after several counter-attacks, by-foot members of the 5th Dragoon. On July 17, the regiment participates in the recapture of Œuilly and to the enemy's rejection on the Marne. The Second Battle of the Marne is won and the banner now bears the name of that victory: "La Marne 1918". The Germans are retreating and the 5th Dragoon is informed of the victory a few kilometres before Nancy on November 11, 1918.

The 5th Dragoon Regiment participated in the final offensive, entering the Palatinate on December 6 and was stationed in Pirmasens from December to January 1919, then in Landau in February, then Nierstein-Oppenheim on the Rhine in July 1919. In September, the regiment settles in Worms, then Düsseldorf. It was not until 1925 that the 5th Dragoon returned to France, first in Auxonne and then in Gray, where it was disbanded on October 28, 1928.

In November 1929 the regimental banner was entrusted to the 5^{e} Bataillon de dragons portés, a unit that had just been created, on March 9, 1929, replacing the 6^{e} groupe de Chasseurs Cyclistes.

=== World War II ===
In 1939 the 5^{e} bataillon de dragons portés was transformed into the "5th Dragoon Regiment". As part of the 1st Light Cavalry Division it embarked for Aisne on August 27. Following a reorganization in 1940 it passed in the 11th B.L.M. of the Arras General in February. On May 10, it is in Revin, crossed over the Meuse in Dinant and fought in Belgium until May 15, where it participated in the beautiful feat of arms of Morville which allowed the banner to bear the inscription "Meuse 1940". Significantly diminished, the remaining elements pulled back and took position 4 km (2.5 mi) from Hirson, after which they regrouped in Le Nouvion on May 16. On May 17, they settle as support in Oisy. On May 18, what remained of the regiment, 10 officers and 130 brigadiers and dragoons carrying about 5 cartridges each, withdraw in Bohain. While moving, they were intercepted by German tanks. After this last combat with no ammunition left, they remaining elements were taken prisoner. The survivors and the regimental batch withdraw in la Souterraine, where the regiment is disbanded. The banner was taken from the Germans and hidden in the castle of Mérieu, where it remained until the Libération. Following the model of the armistice army, the regiment was reformed in Mâcon in August 1940. On November 8, 1942, following the Anglo-American invasion of French North Africa, the regiment was sent to Toulon to participate in coastal defence, which lasted 10 days. Under Case Anton, the Germans occupied Vichy France and the regiment was disarmed at Macon on September 27.

=== The Resistance ===
Most of the demobilized dragoons fought on in clandestinity. Many of them, arrested by the Gestapo were tortured, massacred or died in deportation. Their sacrifice allows for the inscription "Résistance Bourgogne 1944" on the regimental banner. The 5th in resistance participated in the liberation of Mâcon, Chalon-sur-Saône and Autun. In September 1944, reconstituted in G.R.D., it held the sector of the Beaufortin in the Alps and fought in the Ubaye valley. On April 22 and 23, 1944, it took the La Roche-la-Croix and Saint-Ours forts and participated in the capture of the Col de Larche. On Easter Monday of 1945 in Chambéry, General de Gaulle gave the regiment its banner back. The 5th Dragoon was reformed with two squadrons of Hotchkiss tanks and two reconnaissance squadrons on Bren Carriers.

=== Austria ===
- 1945: Early September, the regiment leaves Chambéry for the surroundings of Arbois to receive complementary material. On September 8, 1945, it leaves its quarters for Austria. On November 8, it is reviewed by General Betouard in Dornbirn then moves towards West Tyrol on November 10. The squadrons settle in Lermoos, Ehrwald, Muhl, the headquarters and the EHR in Reutte.

=== From French North Africa to today ===
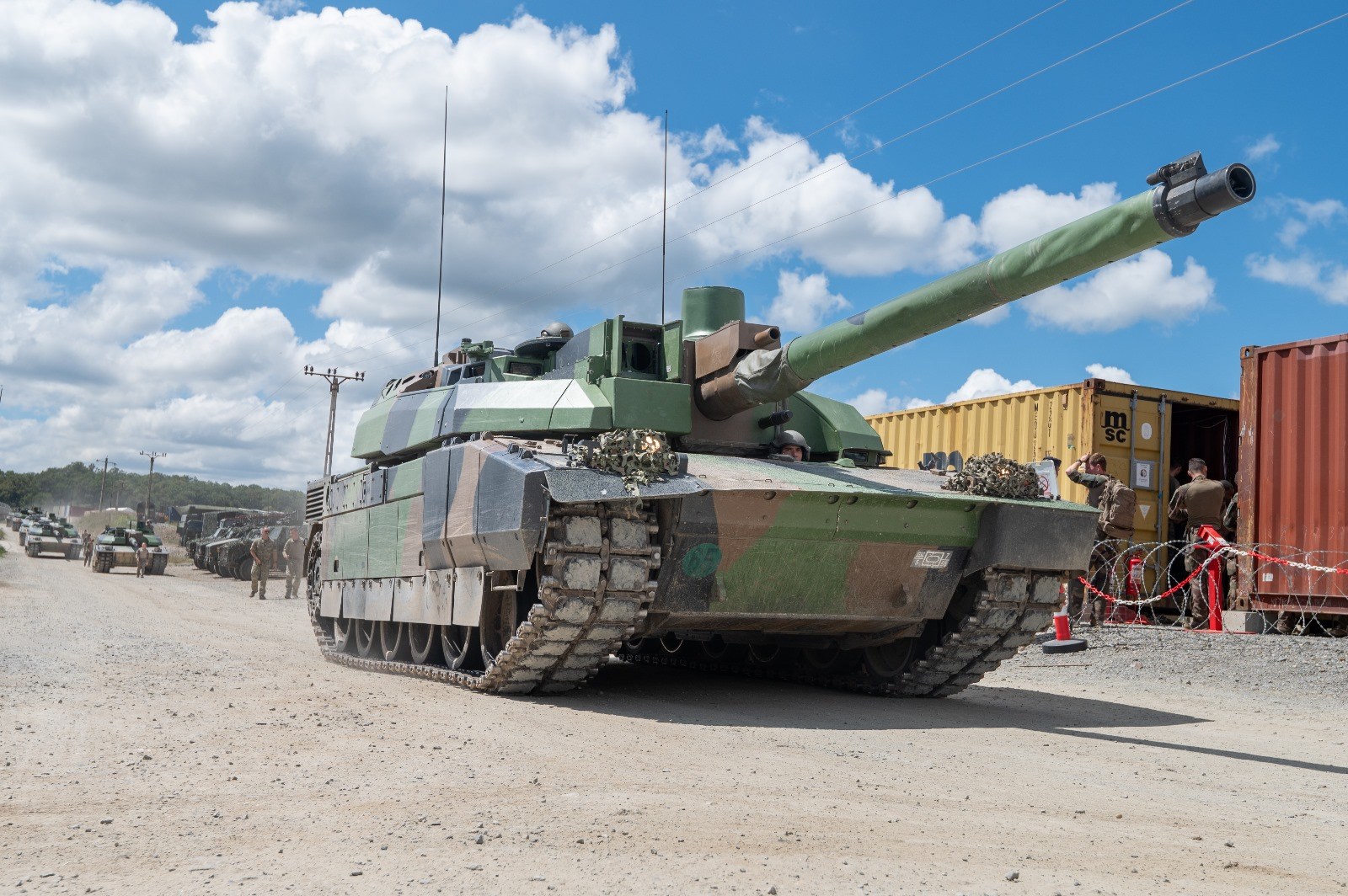
Leclerc tank of the 5th Dragoon Regiment in Romania

- 1955: After five years of living in Austria, the 5th Dragoons goes back to France and settles in Périgueux where it is transformed into a medium Sherman tank regiment. On February 1, the regiment is transformed into an Instruction Center for the Armored Arm and Cavalry branch for units engaged in French North Africa. It is disbanded in 1964. On September 5, 1955, an infantry-type battalion is created with officers of the 5th Dragoons. This unit, assembled at the Ruchart Camp, takes the name of "Dragoon Battalion 2/342". It lands in Casablanca on October 10 and is stationed east of Rabat.
- 1956: In January, the 2/342 moves to Touissit, south of Oujda to ensure the protection of the Algeria-Morocco border between Oujda and Figuig. On March 1, it becomes the 21st Dragoon Regiment.
- 1964–1978: On June 1, 1964, the 7th Chasseur Regiment of Africa in Friedrichshafen takes the name of 5th Dragoon Regiment. It is equipped with AMX-13 and AMX SS-11 tanks. In 1968, it is garrisoned in Tübingen until it is disbanded on August 31, 1978.
- 1978–2003: On September 1, 1978, the 5th Dragoon Regiment is reborn in Valdahon as an AMX-30B combat tank regiment, replacing the disbanded 30th Dragoons.
- In 1991, it is part of the 7th Regional Military Division and comprises a command and service squadron (ECS), 3 tank squadrons with AMX-17, an instruction squadron and the lighting squadron of the armored division.
- In 1992, it receives more AMX-30B and gets another tank squadron.
- In July 1994, the land army reorganization put the regiment into the 27th Mountain Infantry Division. It became the armored regiment of the division with its headquarters in Grenoble.
- In 2016, the regiment was reformed, receiving Leclerc tanks as well as VBCI, VAB, VBL and PVP armored vehicles.

The 5th Dragoon Regiment remains operational at present. Since 2016, its squadrons were engaged in overseas missions in Lebanon (Daman) and Mali (Barkhane). The regiment also contributes to NATO missions in Estonia (Lynx) and Romania (Aigle).

== Structure ==
- Combat Squadrons
  - Escadron de reconnaissance et d'intervention - Armored recon squadron
  - 1er Escadron blindé - 1st Armored squadron
  - 2e Escadron blindé - 2nd Armored squadron
  - 3e Escadron blindé - 3rd Armored squadron
  - 1ère Compagnie d'infanterie - 1st Support infantry company
  - 2e Compagnie d'infanterie - 2nd Support infantry company
- Support Squadrons
  - Escadron de commandement et de logistique - Command and logistics squadron
  - Compagnie d'appui mixte (génie et artillerie) - Mixed engineer and artillery company
  - Escadron d'intervention de réserve - Reserve squadron

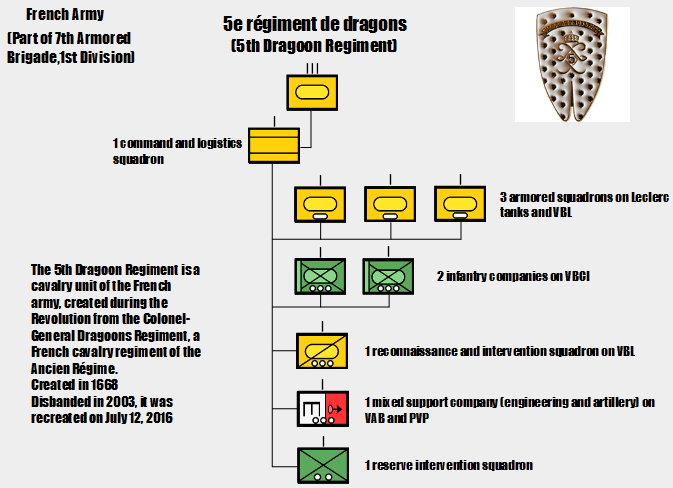
Structure of the 5th dragoon regiment

== Filiation ==
Double heritage:

- 1656: Foreign Dragoons of the King (Dragons étrangers du Roi)
- 1668: Colonel-General Regiment (Régiment Colonel-Général), formed by the duplication of the Foreign Dragoons of the King
- 1791: 5th Dragoon Regiment
- 1814: Dragoon Regiment of the Dauphin (n°3)
- 1815: 5th Dragoon Regiment
- 1816: Dragoon Regiment of the Hérault (n°5)
- 1825: 5th Dragoon Regiment
- 1928: Disbanded
- 1929: Recreated following the traditions of the 6th group of cyclist chasseurs (6e groupe de chasseurs cyclistes (6th DC) and of the 5th dragoons under the name of 5th carrier dragoons battalion
- 1939: 5th Dragoon Regiment
- 1942: Disbanded
- 1944: 5th Dragoon Regiment
- 1946: Disbanded
- 1948: 5th Dragoon Regiment
- 1951: Disbanded
- 1953: 5th Dragoon Regiment
- 1964: Disbanded and immediately recreated with elements from the 7th Chasseurs Regiment of Africa (7^{e} Régiment de chasseurs d'Afrique (7^{e} RCA )
- 2003: Disbanded on June 30, 2003.
- 2016: Reestablished as a combined arms cavalry regiment within the 7th Armored Brigade

=== Garrisons ===
- 1871–1873: Camp de Graves, Abbeville, Amiens
- 1873–1885: Saint Omer
- 1885–1914: Compiègne
- 1919–1925: Worms puis Düsseldorf
- 1925–1928: Auxonne puis Gray
- 1948–1951: Schwaz et Hall (Austria)
- 1953–1964: Périgueux
- 1964–1968: Friedrichshafen
- 1968–1978: Tübingen
- 1978–2003: Le Valdahon
- 2016–present: Mailly-le-Camp

=== Corps chiefs ===
Colonel Generals (from 1668)

- 1668: Antoine Nompar de Caumont, Duke of Lauzun
- 1669: Nicolas d'Argouges, Marquis of Rannes
- 1678: Louis François, duc de Boufflers
- 1692: René de Froulay de Tessé
- 1703: Antoine V de Gramont, Duke of Guiche
- 1704: François de Franquetot de Coigny
- 1734: Jean-Antoine-François de Franquetot, Count of Coigny
- 1748: François de Franquetot, Duke of Coigny (for the second time, in replacement of his brother, killed in a duel)
- 1754: Marie-Charles-Louis d'Albert de Luynes, Duke of Chevreuse
- 1771: François-Henri de Franquetot de Coigny, Duke of Coigny
- 1783: Louis-Joseph-Charles-Amable d'Albert, Duke of Luynes

=== Mestres de camp, commandants and colonels ===
- 1671: Gabriel de Cassagnet, Marquis of Tilladet
- 1681: Balthazar Phelypeaux, Count of Saint Florentin
- 1692: N. de Saint Mars
- 1694: N. Moret de Bournonville
- 1702: Charles Legendre de Berville
- 1719: N. de Préval
- 1727: Jean Toussaint de La Pierre, Marquis of Frémeur
- 1744: Gédéon Marie Léopold, Marquis of Goyon
- 1748: Charles Marie Léopold, Count of Dunois
- 1758: Marie Jean Louis Riquet, Chevalier of Caraman
- 1769: Louis-Joseph-Charles-Amable d'Albert, Duke of Luynes
- 1771: Jean-Philippe de Franquetot, Chevalier of Coigny
- 1780: Jean Jacob, Baron of Coëhorn
- 1784: Antoine Louis de La Vieuville, Marquis of Wignacourt
- 1786: Hugues Hyacinthe-Timoléon, Duke of Cossé
- 1788: Pierre Charles, Count of Seuil
- 1791: Joachim Charton
- 1792: Auguste Marie Henri Picot de Dampierre
- 1792: Marc Antoine de Beaumont
- 1793: Pierre Joseph Le Clerc, dit Verdet
- 1796: Édouard Jean Baptiste Milhaud
- 1800: Louis Bonaparte
- 1803: Ythier Sylvain Privé
- 1804: Jacques Nicolas, Baron Lacour
- 1808: Louis Ernest Joseph, Count of Sparre
- 1812: Jean-Baptiste Louis Morin
- 1815: Jean-Baptiste Antoine Canavas de Saint-Amand
- 1815: Borie de Vintimille
- 1816: de Calvières
- 1818: de Hanache
- 1830: de Lafitte
- 1833: Koenig
- 1843: de Solliers

=== Corps chiefs ===
- 1900: Villiers
- 1903: Granier de Cassagnac
- 1906: Gallet
- 1907: Boudenat
- 1910: de Lallemand du Marais
- 1914: Dauve
- 1916: Maissiat
- 1917: Bucant
- 1918: Letixerant
- 1920: Morgon
- 1921: Herbillon
- 1923: Villemont
- 1925: Wallace
- 1929: de Causans
- 1934: de Saint-Laumer
- 1938: Drand de Villers
- 1940: Chavannes de Dalmassy
- 1940: Brousset
- 1940: Watteau
- 1944: de La Ferté Senectère
- 1945: de Legue de Keplean
- 1946: de Coulanges
- 1948: d'Origny
- 1951: Dewatre
- 1952: Brute de Remur
- 1954: Jouslin de Noray
- 1957: Lavigne
- 1959: de Chasteignier
- 1961: Ceroni
- 1964: Duplay
- 1966: Gilliot
- 1968: Martin
- 1970: Ract-Madoux
- 1972: de la Follye de Joux
- 1974: Pichot
- 1975: Chaix
- 1977: Morin
- 1978: Allard
- 1979: Charpy
- 1981: Toujouse
- 1983: d'Hérouville
- 1985: Millier
- 1987: Ledeuil
- 1989: Saulais
- 1991: Boyer
- 1993: Leduc
- 1995: de Quatrebarbes
- 1997: de La Bretoigne
- 1999–2001: Colonel MARTIAL
- 2001–2003: Colonel ESPARBES
- 2009-2011 : Colonel DUTRONCY (CENTAC-5eRD)
- 2011-2013 : Colonel FAIVRE(CENTAC-5eRD)
- 2013-2015 : Colonel SICARD (CENTAC-5eRD)
- 2015-2016 : lieutenant-colonel BENQUET (CENTAC-5^{e} RD)
- 2016-2018 : Colonel PATTIER (5^{e} RD)
- 2018-2020 : Colonel de Fontanges,
- 2020-2022 : Colonel MARTIN,
- 2022-2024: Colonel BUR
- 2024-: Colonel DENECHAUD

=== Banner ===
It bears, sewed in golden letters in its layers, the following inscriptions:

- Valmy 1792
- Wattignies 1793
- Arcole 1796
- Austerlitz 1805
- Eylau 1807
- L'Ourcq 1914
- Vosges 1915 (traditions of the 6th groupe de chasseurs cyclistes)
- La Marne 1918
- La Meuse 1940
- Bourgogne Resistance 1944

=== Decorations ===
Its tie is decorated:

- With the Croix de Guerre 1914–1918, with 3 palms and 2 silver stars (distinctions of the 6 chasseurs cyclistes).
- With the Croix de Guerre 1939–1945, with 1 palm.
- Fourragère, with the colours of the Croix de Guerre ribbon, 1914–1918.

== Badges ==
=== Heraldry ===
The first badge was designed in 1929 by Captain Lemaire. It represented an "azure star kept in a giant ivory number 5- the badge being entirely enamelled and unframed".

The last badge to be used was created in 1965. It features the model helmet from 1874, with which the Dragoons went to the front in 1914. The mane was exaggeratedly widened in order to accommodate the crowned monogram of king Louis XIV, framing the number 5. The inscription on the edging reminds us that the regiment was created in 1668 to be attached to the responsibility of the Colonel General of the Dragoons created the same year for the benefit of the famous Duke of Lauzun.

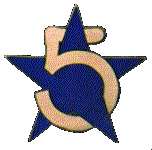
1929

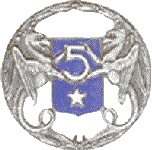
1936

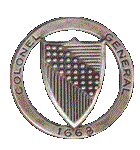
1945

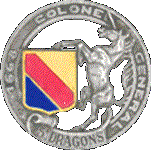
1948

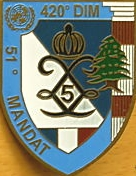
Liban

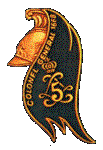
1965
