= Ouvrage Roche-la-Croix =

- Part of Maginot Line, Alpine Line
- Southeast France

Site information
- Controlled by: France
- Open to the public: Yes

Location
- Coordinates: 44.46857°N 6.80073°E

Site history
- In use: Preserved
- Materials: Concrete, steel
- Battles/wars: Italian invasion of France

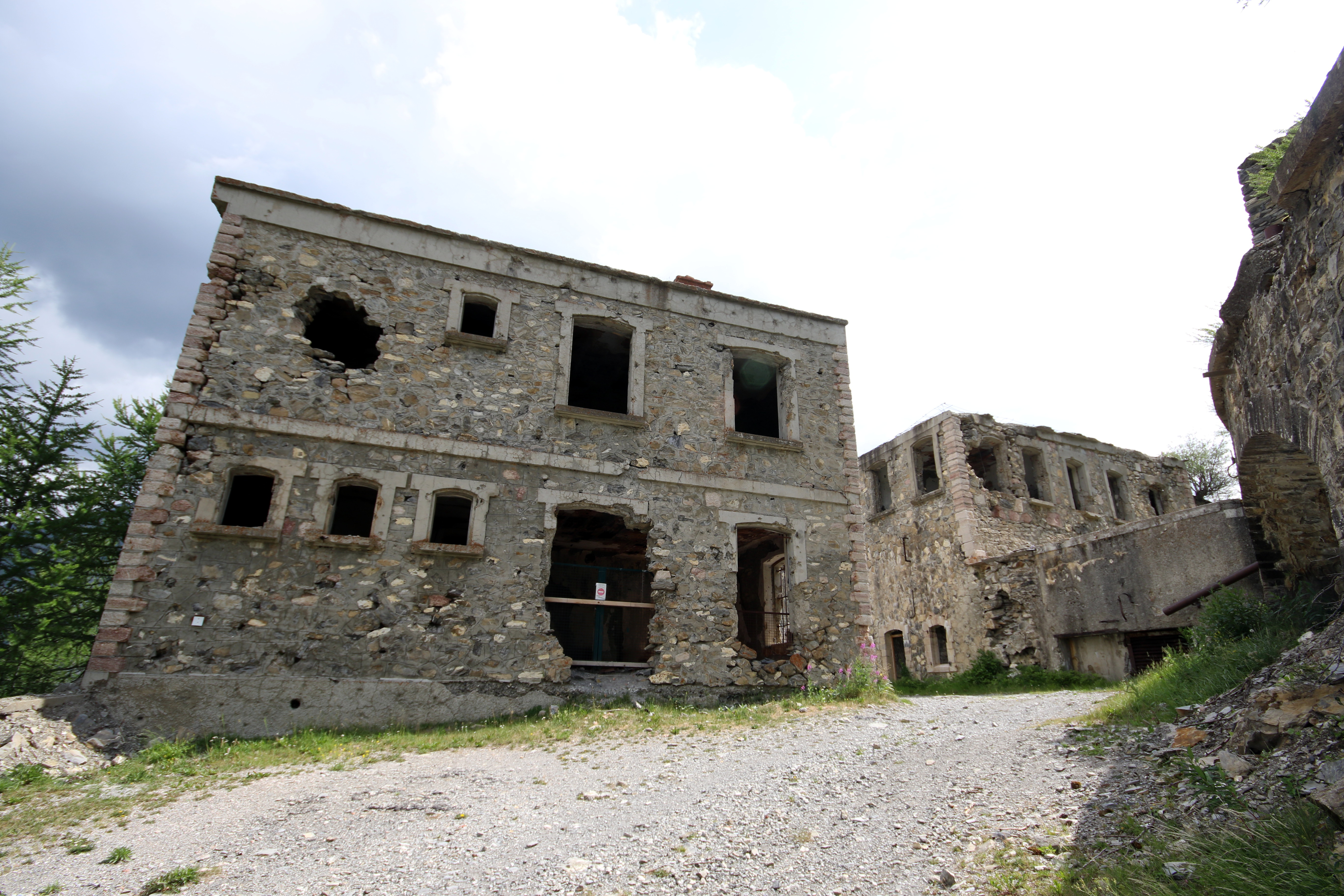

Ouvrage Roche-la-Croix is a work (gros ouvrage) of the Maginot Line's Alpine extension, the Alpine Line, also known as the Little Maginot Line. The ouvrage consists of one entry block, two infantry blocks, one artillery block and two observation blocks in the vicinity of the Col de Larche. An aerial tram was provided for better access. The position is located at the top of a sheer escarpment that dominates Meyronnes and the valley of the Ubayette.

The ouvrage replaced an earlier fortification, the Redoute de Roche-la-Croix (or Fort Inférieure), built as part of the Séré de Rivières system between 1883 and 1889. The earlier fort's walls and ditches were kept on two sides of the ouvrage. The fort's pre-Maginot armament was six 138mm guns in casemates with a magazine excavated in the rock. Most of the fort apart from the ditch and caponiers was obliterated by the Maginot construction.

== Description ==
Construction began in March 1931. Costs amounted to 16.7 million francs, including 1.7 million francs for the aerial tram.

- Block 1 (entry): one machine gun embrasure. The space around the entry block is very limited. The aerial tram entrance on the upper level was linked to the main ouvrage in 1937 via an avalanche-protected tunnel-like shelter constructed above grade and armored with rocks, using a counterweighted 60 cm rail system at a 50% slope.
- Block 2 (infantry): two machine gun embrasures and one grenade launcher embrasure. This block and Block 3 are effectively counterscarp positions, covering the ditch of the old Séré de Rivières fort, and reached by galleries outside the enclosure of the old fort.
- Block 3 (infantry): two machine gun embrasures and one grenade launcher embrasure.
- Block 4 (observation): one machine gun cloche and one observation cloche.
- Block 5 (artillery): one twin 75mm gun turret, one grenade launcher cloche, two 75mm gun embrasures and one 81mm mortar embrasure.
- Block 6 (artillery): one observation cloche and one grenade launcher embrasure. The position was called the observatoire de l'égout ("observatory of the sewer"), on a lower level, perched on a vertical cliff face. It was added in 1937–38 to provide additional flanking coverage to Saint-Ours.

A proposed gallery to connect the ouvrage to the nearby above-ground peacetime barracks was not pursued.

The Roche-la-Croix supérieure battery 44°27′52.78″N 06°47′59.46″E, or "Fort Supérieure", was built between 1884 and 1889 to protect the original Fort Roche-la-Croix (or Fort Inférieure). It continued in that role, equipped with two machine guns and an 81mm mortar. The Abri du Ancien Camp as well as the observation posts La Duyère and Les Calanches were associated with Roche-la-Croix. Additional fortifications on the opposite site of the valley form a barrier to an advance through the Ubayette valley. The battery and the original Redoute de Roche-la-Croix are closely associated with the system of fortifications centering on the Fort de Tournoux 3.7 kilometres (2.3 mi) to the west, built in the late 19th century.

== History ==
See Fortified Sector of the Dauphiné for a broader discussion of the Dauphiné sector of the Alpine Line.

Roche-la-Croix fired on an Italian patrol that crossed into French territory on 17 June 1940. As Italian troops of the Forli Division advanced into France on 20 June, they were bombarded by Roche-la-Croix's 75mm gun turret, supported by fire from Saint Ours Haut, stopping the advance. The turret fired four salvos the following day. On the 22nd, Roche-la-Croix's turret was used for counter-battery fire against Italian artillery, followed by fire on Italian forces advancing along the Col des Monges, supported by fire from Block 6 of the main ouvrage and Roche-la-Croix Supérieure. Additional fire was directed to support the defense of Ouvrage Plate Lombard. On the 24th the turret and casemate fired at the Col Rémi and the Tête-Dure, as well as the Col de Larche. The armistice of 25 June brought action to an end. During this period Roche-la-Crox fired 1909 shots from the turret, 401 from the casemate and 128 shorts from the mortar battery.

After the 1940 armistice, Italian forces occupied the Alpine ouvrages and disarmed them. In August 1943, southern France was occupied by the German 19th Army, which took over many of the Alpine positions that had been occupied by the Italians until Italy's withdrawal from the war in September 1943.

Free French forces assaulted Roche-la-Croix on 22 April 1945, with the German garrison surrendering after 17 hours. Immediately after the war, the Alpine region was regarded as an area of medium priority for restoration and reuse by the military. By the 1950s the positions in the Southeast of France were restored and operational again. However, by 1960, with France's acquisition of nuclear weapons, the cost and effectiveness of the Maginot system was called into question. Between 1964 and 1971 nearly all of the Maginot fortifications were deactivated.

== Present condition ==
Roche-la-Croix has been preserved and may be visited during the summer months.

== See also ==
- List of Alpine Line ouvrages
- Ouvrage Saint Ours Haut, a gros ouvrage on the opposite side of the Ubayette valley
- Ouvrage Saint Ours Bas, a smaller position by the valley road

== Bibliography ==
- Allcorn, William. The Maginot Line 1928-45. Oxford: Osprey Publishing, 2003. ISBN 1-84176-646-1
- Kaufmann, J.E. and Kaufmann, H.W. Fortress France: The Maginot Line and French Defenses in World War II, Stackpole Books, 2006. ISBN 0-275-98345-5
- Kaufmann, J.E., Kaufmann, H.W., Jancovič-Potočnik, A. and Lang, P. The Maginot Line: History and Guide, Pen and Sword, 2011. ISBN 978-1-84884-068-3
- Mary, Jean-Yves; Hohnadel, Alain; Sicard, Jacques. Hommes et Ouvrages de la Ligne Maginot, Tome 4 - La fortification alpine. Paris, Histoire & Collections, 2009. ISBN 978-2-915239-46-1 (in French)
- Mary, Jean-Yves; Hohnadel, Alain; Sicard, Jacques. Hommes et Ouvrages de la Ligne Maginot, Tome 5. Paris, Histoire & Collections, 2009. ISBN 978-2-35250-127-5 (in French)
