= Larche =

Larche may refer to the following places in France:

- Larche, Alpes-de-Haute-Provence, a commune in the department of Alpes-de-Haute-Provence
- Larche, Corrèze, a commune in the department of Corrèze
- Col de Larche, the French name for the Maddalena Pass
- L'Arche, a federation of non-profit organizations helping people with intellectual disabilities
