= Fort de Tournoux =

- Part of Alpine Line (backup), Séré de Rivières system
- Southeast France
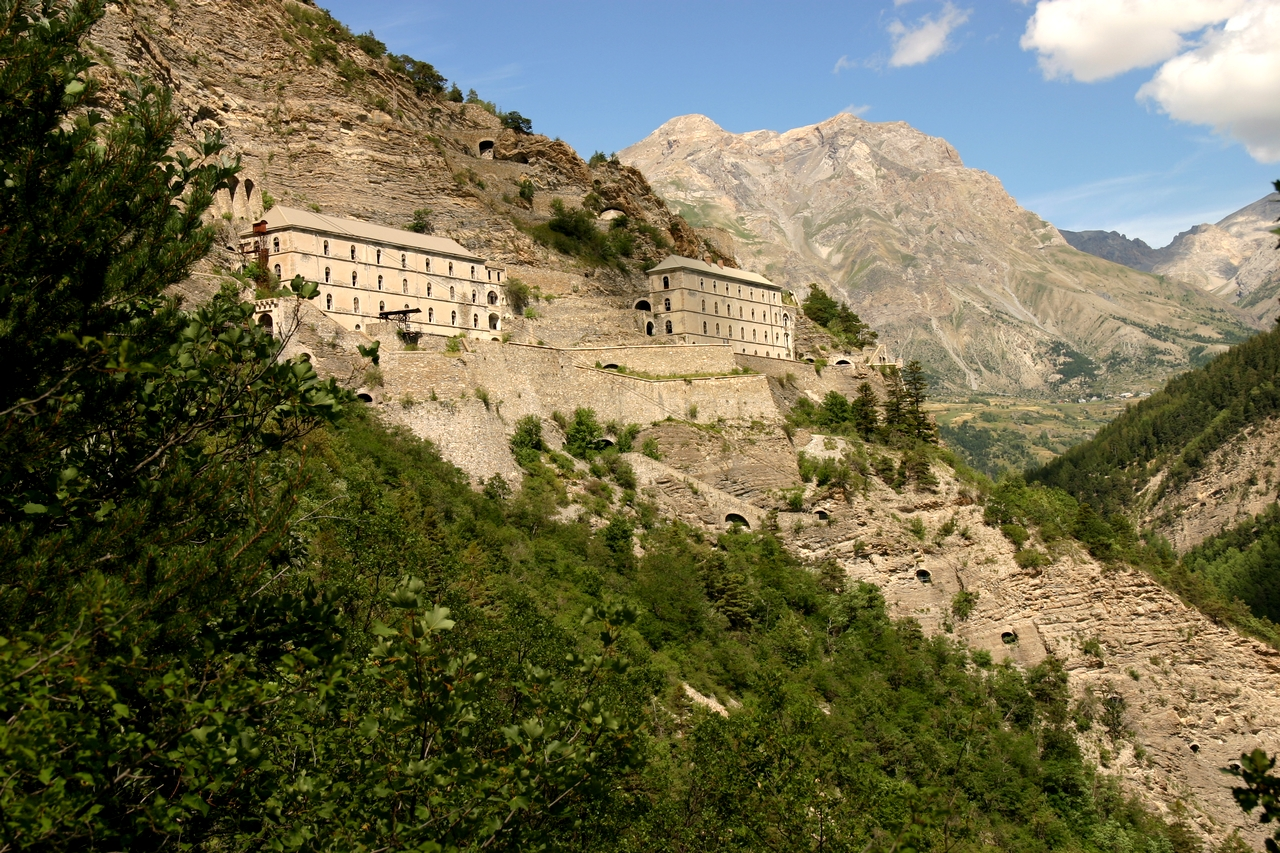

Site information
- Owner: Communes of Ubaye
- Controlled by: France
- Open to the public: By appointment

Location
- Location within France
- Coordinates: 44.469°N 6.753°E

Site history
- In use: Preserved
- Materials: Stone, concrete
- Battles/wars: Italian invasion of France

The Fort de Tournoux is a fortification complex in the Ubaye Valley in the French Alps. It was built between 1843 and the early 20th century to defend France against invasion from Italy and Savoy. It was described as the "Military Versailles of the 19th century," resembling a Tibetan monastery on the mountainside above the Ubaye. The fort is actually an ensemble of fortifications, including some "batteries" that rival the main fort in size and power.

== Prehistory ==
Earliest records show that the position of the village of Tournoux was a strategically important one, with the tiny plateau offering food and watering facilities to armies crossing the Col de Larche from modern day Italy and the Col de Vars. There is evidence of Roman occupation of the plateau.

Of later times little survives, but there are the traces of a 7th-century fortified church in the valley. Between the 7th century and the 17th century, the upper Ubaye Valley changed hands between states about 17 times – usually because either the Col de Larche or the Col de Vars became snowless first, and whichever side was nearest was able to march in while the other sat waiting for the snow to melt.

In the 18th century, the valley finally became part of France and the first proper fortifications were built. Three redoubts, of which the Redoubt de Berwick still remains (albeit in modified form), were constructed as shelters for garrisons of soldiers. At the time, the use of cannons was relatively limited and such fighting as there was would have been hand-to-hand or musket-fire only, with the presence of the soldiers being the major deterrent to invasion over the cols.

== Layout ==
=== Caserne, Fort Moyen and Fort Supérieur ===
The Fort de Tournoux is constructed more-or-less continuously up the side of the mountain from 1,300 metres (4,300 ft) altitude to 2,000 metres (6,600 ft) in several levels. The lowest level is the barracks (Caserne Pellegrin) at 1300 m next to the main road from the Cols (Larche and Vars) to the village of la Condamine and the towns of Jausiers and Barcelonnette. A battery at this level, built between 1846 and 1862, is called Batterie XII. Linking these with the Fort Moyen ("middle fort", also known as Fort Grouchy) is a road, constructed to allow mules to ascend with carts – so at a maximum gradient of 10% with frequent hairpin turns. The hairpins were constructed so that the mules could park their double-ended carts and run-around to pull the cart in the opposite direction up the next stretch, thus avoiding the need to turn around the hairpin bends, which often caused carts to topple over and spill their contents.

The Caserne Pellegrin and the Fort Moyen are also linked by an enormous staircase with over 1000 steps which was constructed in the rock, with windows opening onto the “French” side of the fort and batteries (notably the B-douze — B12) facing the passes. The windows provided light and air and were also used for the removal of spoil from the tunnels.

Finally there is a cableway that allowed stores to be carried to the Fort Moyen which was installed after the fort was electrified in 1908.

From the Fort Moyen is a serpentine road that hugs the mountainside up to the Fort Supérieur. Above this there is another underground passage that links further up still to the Batterie du Clos des Caurres. Above this still is the Observatoire and Batterie de Serre de l’Aut at the top of the mountain.

There is a covered roadway that links the Fort Moyen with the village of Tournoux, providing another means of entry and exit – this way is very heavily protected with loopholes and gun emplacements.

The Fort Supérieur and the Batterie du Clos des Caurres are protected by a scarp/counterscarp wall system and by sliding drawbridges, which withdraw into the guardhouse on rollers when closed to traffic. These are simple enough to be operated by two people with very little effort, even after 50+ years of no maintenance.

The total cost of the fort had been envisaged at about 1.5 million francs (in the money of the time) but the final cost was over 3.5 million, causing a huge hole in the government finances at the time.

=== Armament ===
The main fort in 1940 contained relatively little in the way of armament: three 81 mm mortars were located in Fort Moyen, firing to the east, while two 81 mm mortars, also firing to the east, and two 95 mm guns firing to the northeast along the valley, were located in Batterie XII at the level of the barracks. An anti-aircraft battery was located in Fort Supérieur. Four 155 mm guns were located in Tournoux itself, 2.4 kilometres (1.5 mi) to the northeast.

A project to locate three 145 mm guns in a casemate in Fort Grouchy firing towards the Col de Larche was proposed in 1929, but not pursued. Another project, to outfit Batterie XII with four 155 mm guns was started in 1931 and completed in 1934, but the armament was never installed.

=== Batterie du Clos des Caures ===
The Batterie du Clos des Caurres 44°28′14.51″N 06°44′55.51″E is even higher than Fort Supérieur, at 1,780 metres (5,840 ft) and contains the main armament of the complex. Built between 1879 and 1881, the Séré de Rivières system fort was planned to mount six de Bange 155 mm guns. The underground gallery linking to Fort Supérieur was completed between 1880 and 1883. The deep ditch around the position was completed in 1890, and from then until 1897 a wall was built connecting to Fort Supérieur. The position was manned by 656 men under 7 officers. Prior to World War I, efforts were made to provide concrete cover over critical areas, which were not completed in 1914. A casemate for two 75 mm guns was built to cover the flank of the Vallon Claus battery, and the fort was re-armed with eight 95 mm guns and four 120 mm guns. Other sources give an armament of four 75mm guns, four 155mm guns and three 81mm mortars.

=== Fort de Serre de l'Aut ===
The small Fort de Serre de l'Aut 44°28′10.49″N 06°44′24.51″E was built 1890–1893 as an outpost on the edge of a cliff 1.1 kilometres (0.68 mi) to the west of the main complex at 2,945 metres (9,662 ft). It is connected to the main Fort Tournoux complex by a military road. Armament consisted of four 95 mm guns

=== Batterie du Vallon Claus ===
The Batterie du Vallon Claus 44°30′43″N 06°43′43.32″E is located 5.2 kilometres (3.2 mi) to the north of the main complex. Built 1880–85, the battery is a walled mountaintop enclosure with a series of observation posts extending to the west. It was armed with two to six 75 mm guns. The garrison comprised 75 men, housed in a barracks nearby, connected to the main fort via a subterranean ammunition magazine. The battery covered the entrance to the Maurin valley and the small valley of Plate Lombard. The four observation posts are known as the Lignes des Abrupts. At an altitude varying from 2,130 metres (6,990 ft) to 2,273 metres (7,457 ft), the posts are simple, nearly square buildings with no permanent armament.

== Stages in construction ==
Begun in 1843, the Fort Moyenne and Fort Supérieur were constructed over a 20-year period. The construction of Fort Moyenne spanned 1846–1862, and Fort Supérieure 1852–1860. The B12 and the underground stairway were also constructed at this time. The purpose of the fort was to lock the access to the Ubaye valley from the Cols, and the fort was so positioned to allow covering fire from the bronze cannons firing round shot that were installed there. With a range of 3-400 m, these cannons were able to cover the roads (well, tracks) coming down from the Col de Vars and the Col de Larche, as well as the upper Ubaye valley. Looking from the B12, one can see what an excellent prospect of the valleys this afforded. Cannons were also installed at batteries on the eastern side of the Fort Moyenne and the Fort Supérieur.

The main building materials were faced stone – Ubaye marble, used for load-bearing structures and for decoration – and the local stone, hewed from the mountain itself, used as a rough construction material along with lime mortar.

The fort was designed and built by the French Army engineering regiment – the Genie with some help from local labourers – many of whom worked as blacksmiths, carpenters and stonemasons – this was more profitable to them than working the fields. The local economy also benefited from the presence of the forts and the army, both during construction and afterwards, the villages of la Condamine and Gleizolles in particular.

By 1860, improvements in artillery, particularly the replacement of the bronze cannon with steel, rifled guns firing pointed, exploding, shells gave the opportunity for accurate fire over much longer ranges. Typical guns at the time could hit targets 8–9 km away. The decision was made to create extra batteries above the Fort Supérieur — the Batterie des Caurres and the Batterie de Serre de l'Aut. These gave a much better firing line for engaging targets earlier in their approach over the cols and with the Observatoire de Serre de l’Aut at the top of the mountain meant that the fort was able to secure the valley in a very efficient manner.

In the 1880s further improvements in artillery demanded additional upgrades, resulting in the batteries of Vyraisse, Mallemort, Cuguret and the nearby Fort Roche-la-Croix, which later became the basis of the Maginot Ouvrage Roche-la-Croix.

By the end of the First World War advances in military technology meant that the defences of the fort were improved with concrete and the usage of the fort changed somewhat.

In the 1920s and 30s, several Maginot Line forts were built, on either side of the Col de Larche at Roche-la-Croix (south side) and St-Ours (north side). As mentioned below, these were linked by telegraph to the Fort de Tournoux.

== Complement ==
The fort supported a complement of 900 officers and men, who were barracked in the Caserne Pellegrin at the base of the fort and in the Fort Moyenne. Looking at the Fort Moyenne in the pictures, the left-hand building was for the soldiers and NCO’s, the right-hand building for the officers. The buildings were supplied with piped drinking water from a source captee at the top of the mountain, which fed huge tanks at the Fort Supérieur and the Fort Moyenne. Electricity came to the fort in 1908. Communications were originally by a form of semaphore from mountain-top to mountain-top, but eventually a cable-telegraph was installed linking all the mountain-forts in the area, Fort de Tournoux being the hub for this network.

At the back of the main barrack buildings are wide, protected walkways (the buildings had staircases but no internal corridors) with access to each room via the walkways and landings on the back of each building. The protected thoroughfare was designed to provide natural ventilation to the buildings to prevent damp – a very successful design feature. Above the buildings are various workshops and magazines. The magazines are interesting because they are built as buildings within buildings, to minimise damp and increase the flow of air around the munitions. The floors are nailed with bronze nails, to minimise sparks.

Above the entrance roadway and the soldiers’ barrack block are arched structures (looking a bit like tall, thin bridges) attached to the rock face. These were built to catch rocks released by freeze-thaw erosion of the rock face above. Some of these fallen rocks were collected and used for further construction of the fort.

== Action ==
The fort saw action during the Second World War. It was attacked by Benito Mussolini's fascist forces on the day that Adolf Hitler entered Paris – fighting ensued for three days, but was cut short by the fall of France. Later in the war, in October 1944 the fort was occupied by the German army as Free French forces approached up the Ubaye valley from their invasion in southern France. As the French got closer, the Germans destroyed the water and electricity supplies and looted much of the fittings of the fort for firewood etc. They then occupied the Maginot forts nearby and holed-up for the winter. The French Army spent the very cold winter of 1944–45 in the Fort de Tournoux, before finally attacking the Germans and extracting them from the Maginot ouvrages in April 1945.

== Decommissioning ==
The French Army occupied the fort until 1947, leaving only the B12 to be used as an arms store for the Regiment in Barcelonnette. This was eventually decommissioned in 1989.

From 1947 until 1991, Domaine Militaire signs were left to scare away potential explorers, while the Fort Supérieur was well protected by its walls and barbed wire. The forts remained in a fairly good state of repair (although open to the elements) until it was purchased by the local government from the military.

== Preservation ==
Since 1991, the local authority has done some renovation work on the fort, with new roofs on the main blocks at the Fort Moyen and some shoring-up work in the tunnels at the Fort Supérieur. The gates to the fort are now locked and protected and guided tours are a regular occurrence in the summer. The Batterie des Caurres now has an up-to-date use as a relay for TV and mobile phone signals to the local area. The Observatoire is still used for a similar purpose; possibly by the military (this is unclear at the moment).
