= Lac du Lauzanier =

Lake in Alpes-de-Haute-Provence, France

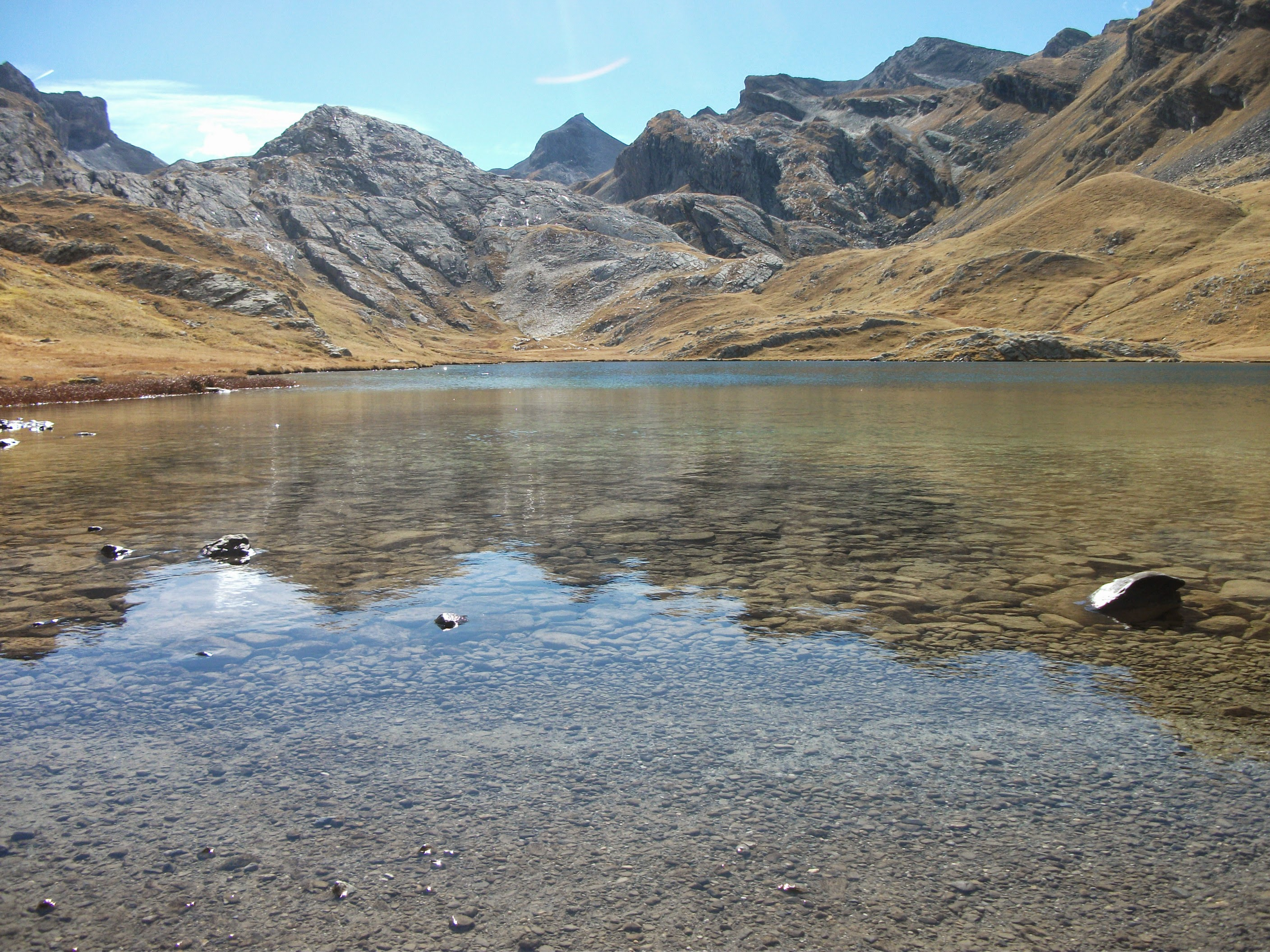

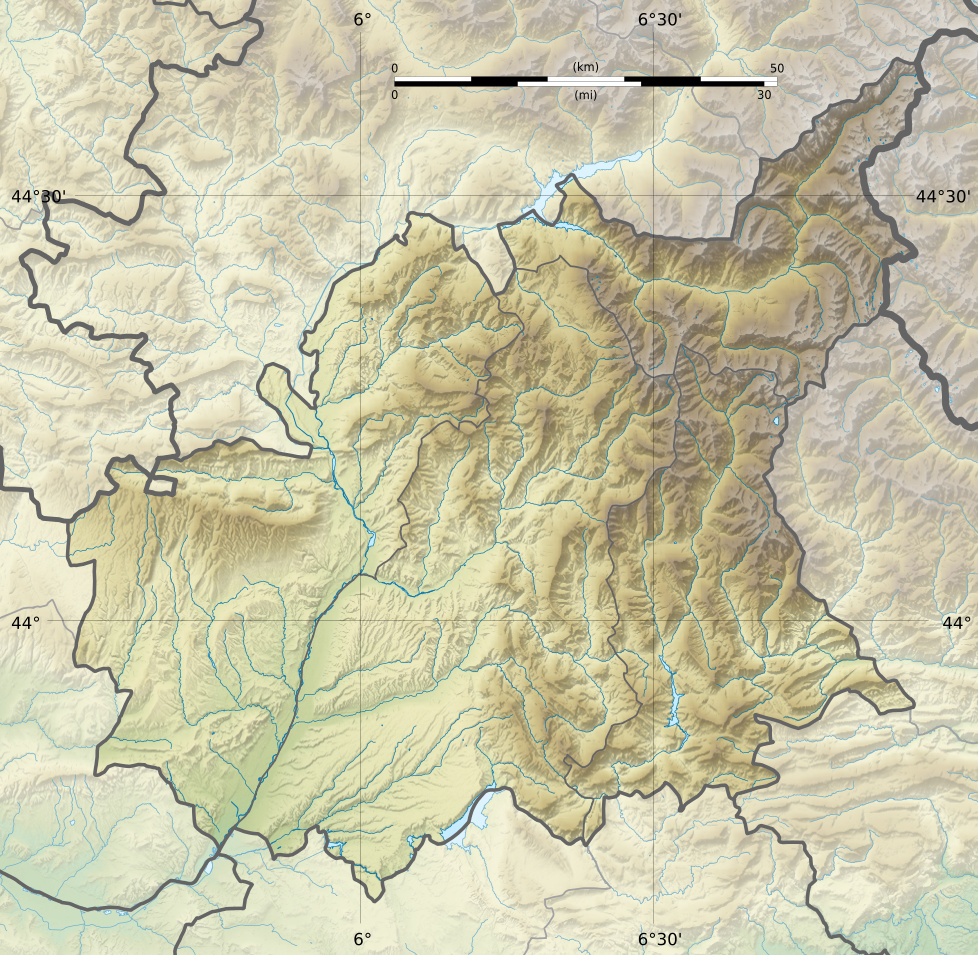
- Location within Alpes-de-Haute-Provence
- Location: Val-d'Oronaye, Alpes-de-Haute-Provence
- Coordinates: 44°22′43″N 6°52′21″E
- Primary outflows: Ubayette
- Basin countries: France
- Max. length: 300 m (980 ft)
- Max. width: 200 m (660 ft)
- Surface elevation: 2,284 m (7,493 ft)

The Lac du Lauzanier (English: Lake of the Lauzanier) is an alpine lake in the Alpes-de-Haute-Provence department, Southeastern France. It is located within the commune of Val-d'Oronaye (formerly within Larche) on the Italian border.
