= Fort de Viraysse =

- Part of Alpine Line (backup), Séré de Rivières system
- Southeast France
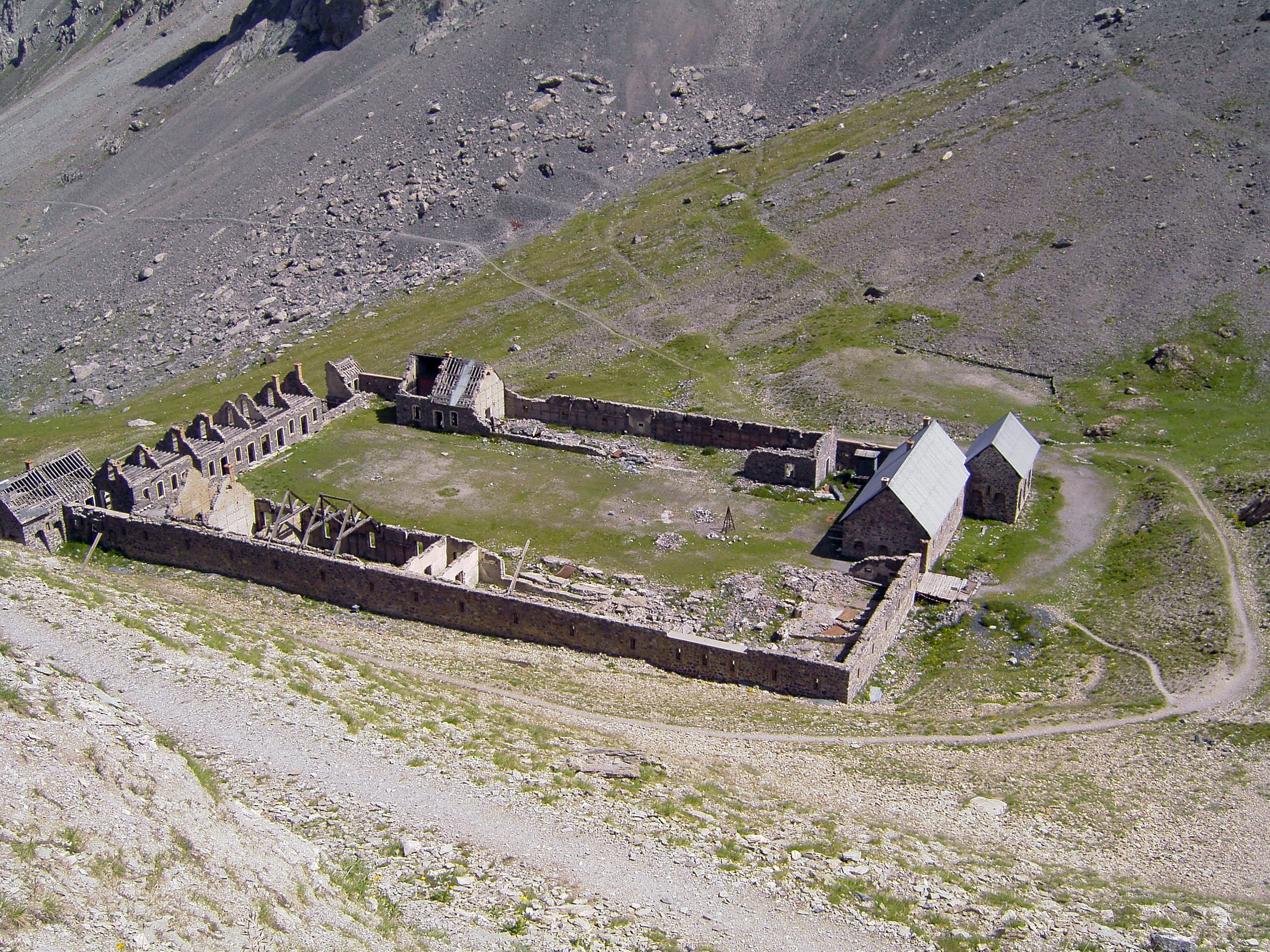

Site information
- Controlled by: France

Location
- Coordinates: 44.47538°N 6.85238°E

Site history
- In use: Preserved
- Materials: Stone, concrete
- Battles/wars: Italian invasion of France

The Fort de Viraysse is a fortification complex in the Cottian Alps overlooking the Ubaye Valley. It was built between 1885 and 1888 to defend France against invasion from Italy. The position was one of the highest military posts in France at 2,772 metres (9,094 ft), and the only one in the Alps with a clear view of Italy. It was constructed as part of the Séré de Rivières system of fortifications, as a small post with an enclosing wall, and formed part of the elaborate fortifications centering on the Fort de Tournoux. The Col de Mallemort is directly adjacent to the fort.

The original armament was four 95mm guns. The casemates were enlarged between 1890 and 1894. In 1940 the Fort de Viraysse was armed with four 150mm mortars, after it was adapted as an observation post for the Alpine Line fortifications farther from the French-Italian border.

The nearby barracks were built 550 metres (1,800 ft) to the northwest of the fort. 44°28′35.2″N 06°51′09.32″E The barracks are arranged in a large rectangle and disposed for defense within the stone walls. The barracks are presently roofless and ruinous.
