= Ouvrage Saint Ours Haut =

- Part of Maginot Line, Alpine Line
- Meyronnes, Southeast France
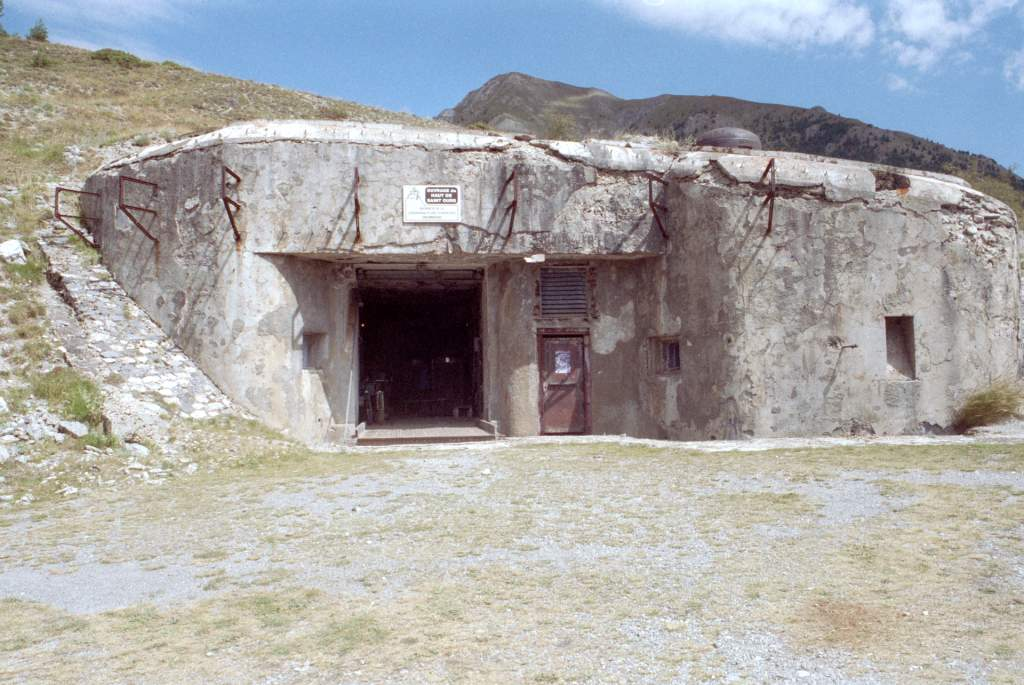
- St. Ours Haut entry block

Site information
- Controlled by: France
- Open to the public: Yes

Location
- Coordinates: 44.47663°N 6.81723°E

Site history
- In use: Preserved
- Materials: Concrete, steel, rock excavation
- Battles/wars: Italian invasion of France, Second Battle of the Alps

Ouvrage Saint Ours Haut is a work (gros ouvrage) of the Maginot Line's Alpine extension, the Alpine Line, also known as the Little Maginot Line. The ouvrage consists of one infantry block, one artillery block, two observation blocks and one combination block in the vicinity of the Col de Larche. It is located on the territory of the commune of Meyronnes. Construction began in March 1931, at a cost of 15.1 million francs.

The bulk of the subterranean galleries lie between Blocks 1 and 2, with branches running out to 3, 4 and 5.

== Description ==
- Block 1 (entry): one machine gun cloche, one grenade launcher cloche and one heavy twin machine gun embrasure.
- Block 2 (artillery): one heavy twin machine gun cloche, one grenade launcher cloche, one 75mm gun embrasure and two 81mm mortar embrasures.
- Block 3 (infantry): one machine gun cloche.
- Block 4 (infantry): one machine gun cloche.
- Block 5 (infantry): one machine gun cloche, one grenade launcher embrasure, three heavy twin machine gun embrasures and two 81mm mortar embrasures.

== History ==
See Fortified Sector of the Dauphiné for a broader discussion of the Dauphiné sector of the Alpine Line.

As Italian troops of the Forli Division advanced into France on 24 June 1940, they were bombarded by Saint Ours Haut's 75mm guns and 81mm mortars, supported by fire from Roche Lacroix, stopping the advance. Saint Ours Haut fired 92 shots from the guns and 379 shots from the mortars. The armistice of 25 June brought fighting to an end.

After the 1940 armistice, Italian forces occupied the Alpine ouvrages and disarmed them. In August 1943, southern France was occupied by the German 19th Army and Italian Alpini, which took over many of the Alpine positions that had been occupied by the Italians until Italy's withdrawal from the war in September 1943.

In 1945, the Germans evacuated Saint Ours Haut during the night of 22 April, leaving it free to be occupied the following day by Free French forces. Immediately after the war, the Alpine region was regarded as an area of medium priority for restoration and reuse by the military. By the 1950s the positions in the Southeast of France were restored and operational again. However, by 1960, with France's acquisition of nuclear weapons, the cost and effectiveness of the Maginot system was called into question. Between 1964 and 1971 nearly all of the Maginot fortifications were deactivated.

== Present condition ==
Saint-Ours-Haut is under restoration and may be visited, as part of the Museum of WSaint-Ours-Bas.

== See also ==
- List of Alpine Line ouvrages

== Bibliography ==
- Allcorn, William. The Maginot Line 1928-45. Oxford: Osprey Publishing, 2003. ISBN 1-84176-646-1
- Kaufmann, J.E. and Kaufmann, H.W. Fortress France: The Maginot Line and French Defenses in World War II, Stackpole Books, 2006. ISBN 0-275-98345-5
- Kaufmann, J.E., Kaufmann, H.W., Jancovič-Potočnik, A. and Lang, P. The Maginot Line: History and Guide, Pen and Sword, 2011. ISBN 978-1-84884-068-3
- Mary, Jean-Yves; Hohnadel, Alain; Sicard, Jacques. Hommes et Ouvrages de la Ligne Maginot, Tome 4 - La fortification alpine. Paris, Histoire & Collections, 2009. ISBN 978-2-915239-46-1 (in French)
- Mary, Jean-Yves; Hohnadel, Alain; Sicard, Jacques. Hommes et Ouvrages de la Ligne Maginot, Tome 5. Paris, Histoire & Collections, 2009. ISBN 978-2-35250-127-5 (in French)
