= Ouvrage Plate Lombard =

- Part of Maginot Line, Alpine Line
- Southeast France

Site information
- Controlled by: France

Location
- Coordinates: 44.51531°N 6.82469°E

Site history
- Built by: MOM
- In use: Abandoned
- Materials: Concrete, steel, rock excavation
- Battles/wars: Italian invasion of France

Ouvrage Plate Lombard is a lesser work (petit ouvrage) of the Maginot Line's Alpine extension, the Alpine Line. The ouvrage consists of one entry block, two infantry blocks and one observation block. Unusually for an ouvrage, Plate-Lombard was built by MOM (Main d'Oeuvre Militaire), which usually was responsible for lesser fortifications. The isolated position was commanded in 1940 by Lieutenant de Loye. It controlled the Fouillouse valley and the Col du Vallonet.

== Description ==
- Block 1 (entry): two machine gun embrasures.
- Block 2 (infantry block): one Pamart cloche.
- Block 3 (infantry block): one Pamart cloche.
- Block 4 (observation block): one STG observation cloche.

== History ==
See Fortified Sector of the Dauphiné for a broader discussion of the Dauphiné sector of the Alpine Line.

Plate-Lombard saw action against Italian forces on 22 June 1940, when covering fire from Ouvrage Roche-la-Croix assisted with the defense of Plate Lombard. After German forces occupied southern France, Free French forces completed the liberation of the Briançon area on 25 April 1945.

== See also ==
- List of Alpine Line ouvrages

== Bibliography ==
- Allcorn, William. The Maginot Line 1928-45. Oxford: Osprey Publishing, 2003. ISBN 1-84176-646-1
- Kaufmann, J.E. and Kaufmann, H.W. Fortress France: The Maginot Line and French Defenses in World War II, Stackpole Books, 2006. ISBN 0-275-98345-5
- Kaufmann, J.E., Kaufmann, H.W., Jancovič-Potočnik, A. and Lang, P. The Maginot Line: History and Guide, Pen and Sword, 2011. ISBN 978-1-84884-068-3
- Mary, Jean-Yves; Hohnadel, Alain; Sicard, Jacques. Hommes et Ouvrages de la Ligne Maginot, Tome 4 - La fortification alpine. Paris, Histoire & Collections, 2009. ISBN 978-2-915239-46-1 (in French)
- Mary, Jean-Yves; Hohnadel, Alain; Sicard, Jacques. Hommes et Ouvrages de la Ligne Maginot, Tome 5. Paris, Histoire & Collections, 2009. ISBN 978-2-35250-127-5 (in French)
