= 1st Light Cavalry Division (France) =

French Army division

The French 1st Light Cavalry Division (1er Division de Cavalerie Légère) was a French Army division active during World War II. The 1st Light Cavalry Division was formed alongside the 2nd, 3rd, 4th, and 5th Light Cavalry Divisions in February 1940.

== History ==
=== Second World War ===
==== Battle Of France ====
During the Battle of France in May 1940 the division contained the following units:

- Chief of Staff, 1st Light Division
- Components:
  - 11th Light Motorized Brigade (11e Brigade Légère Motorisée)
    - 1st Armoured Car Regiment (1er Régiment d'Autos-Mitrailleuses)
    - 5th Motorized Dragoon Regiment (5e Régiment de Dragons Portés)
  - 2nd Cavalry Brigade (2e Brigade de Cavalerie)
    - 1st Cavalry Regiment (1er Régiment de Chasseurs à Cheval)
    - 19th Dragoon Regiment (19e Régiment de Dragons)
  - 75th Divisionary Light Cavalry Artillery Regiment (75e Régiment d’Artillerie de Division Légère de Cavalerie)

In 1940 during the occupation of France the division was disbanded.
