= Giulio Perugi =

Italian politician

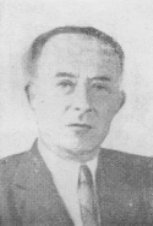
- Born: 14 June 1886; Viterbo, Kingdom of Italy
- Died: 23 February 1949 (aged 62); Rome, Italy
- Military career
- Allegiance: Kingdom of Italy
- Branch: Royal Italian Army
- Rank: Major General
- Commands: 157th Infantry Regiment "Liguria" "Fossalta" Infantry Brigade; 36th Infantry Division Forlì; 26th Infantry Division Assietta; Territorial Defense of Palermo; Territorial Defense of Udine
- Conflicts: Italo-Turkish War; Second Italo-Ethiopian War; World War II; Battle of the Western Alps; Greco-Italian War
- Awards: Bronze Medal of Military Valor; Military Order of Italy; Colonial Order of the Star of Italy

Giulio Perugi (14 June 1886 – 23 February 1949) was an Italian general during World War II. After the war he became a member of the Italian Constituent Assembly.

== Biography ==
He was born in Viterbo on June 14, 1886. After enlisting in the Royal Italian Army he became a cadet at the Royal Military Academy of Infantry and Cavalry of Modena in 1905–1907, after which he was appointed infantry second lieutenant and assigned to the 59th Infantry Regiment "Calabria". He took part in the Italian-Turkish War of 1911–1912 with the 60th Infantry Regiment, being awarded a Bronze Medal of Military Valor. After the war he was admitted to the Army War School in Turin, where he remained until September 1922, when he returned to service with the 60th Infantry Regiment.

Between the two world wars he was commander of the 157th Infantry Regiment "Liguria". He took part in the Second Italo-Ethiopian War as head of the Army transport office, and was then promoted to brigadier general for war merit on 1 July 1937. He was then commander of the "Fossalta" Infantry Brigade and then quartermaster-general of the 2nd Army. From 22 September 1939 he became commander of the 36th Infantry Division Forlì, and on 1 January 1940 he was promoted to the rank of Major General.

After the entry of the Kingdom of Italy into World War II, on 10 June 1940, he participated in operations against France in the western Alps at the head of the Forlì Division. On 1 October 1940 he was transferred at the disposal of the Ministry of War, and from the following 9 December he was appointed commander of the 51st Infantry Division Siena, participating in the Greco-Italian War until January 1941. During the Greek counteroffensive in late 1940, his Division suffered heavy casualties, and Perugi's decision to withdraw from Himara was heavily criticized by his superior Ubaldo Soddu. He was then repatriated and assigned from 1 August 1941 to the command of the division of the 26th Infantry Division Assietta (stationed in Sicily), a post he held until 30 April 1942, when he was replaced by General Pietro Zaglio.

On the same date he was appointed commander of the Territorial Defense of Palermo, which he held until 1 July 1943. From 15 July 1943 he became commander of the Territorial Defense of Udine; following the Armistice of Cassibile, he rejected requests by local anti-fascists to organize the resistance against the Germans, allowing them to enter Italian barracks and depots and quietly seize control of Udine, and on 13 September 1943 he was captured and interned at Oflag 64/Z in Schokken, Poland, where he remained until 9 October 1945.

After his release and return to Italy, he was subsequently elected to the Chamber of Deputies in the ranks of the Common Man's Front, serving in the Constituent Assembly, where he was a member of the commission tasked with drafting the Italian Constitution. He died in Rome on February 23, 1949.
