= Val-d'Oronaye =

Val-d'Oronaye Vau d'Oronaia (Occitan)
- Commune
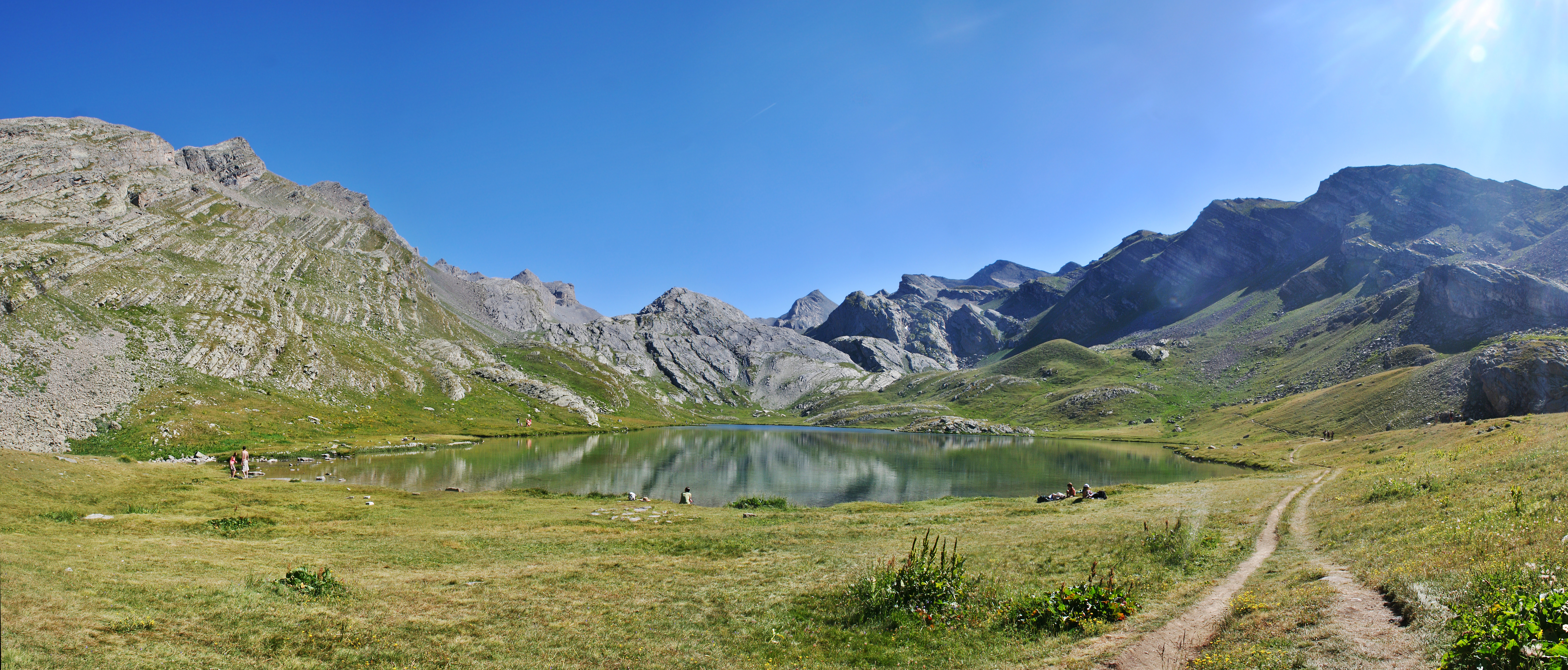
- Lac du Lauzanier
- Location of Val-d'Oronaye
- Location within France Location within Provence-Alpes-Côte d'Azur
- Coordinates: 44°28′34″N 6°47′56″E
- Country: France
- Region: Provence-Alpes-Côte d'Azur
- Department: Alpes-de-Haute-Provence
- Arrondissement: Barcelonnette
- Canton: Barcelonnette
- Intercommunality: CC Vallée de l'Ubaye - Serre-Ponçon

Government
  - Mayor (2026–32): Eric Martinez
- Area^{1}: 109.45 km^{2} (42.26 sq mi)
- Population (2023): 87
  - Density: 0.79/km^{2} (2.1/sq mi)
- Time zone: UTC+01:00 (CET)
  - Summer (DST): UTC+02:00 (CEST)
- INSEE/Postal code: 04120 /04530
- ^{1} French Land Register data, which excludes lakes, ponds, glaciers > 1 km^{2} (0.386 sq mi or 247 acres) and river estuaries.

Val-d'Oronaye (French pronunciation: [val dɔʁɔnaj]; Occitan: Vau d'Oronaia) is an alpine commune on the Italian border in the Alpes-de-Haute-Provence department in the southeastern Provence-Alpes-Côte d'Azur region in France. It was established on 1 January 2016, consisting of the former communes of Meyronnes and Larche. As of 2023, the population of the commune was 87.

== Notable residents ==
- Joseph Ollivier (owner of La Ciudad de Londres department store in Mexico City, which he bought it in 1862) – born May 6, 1829, Plan-Saint-Ours, Meyronnes; died April 5, 1910, Neuilly-sur-Seine

== See also ==
- Communes of the Alpes-de-Haute-Provence department
