= 36th Infantry Division "Forlì" =

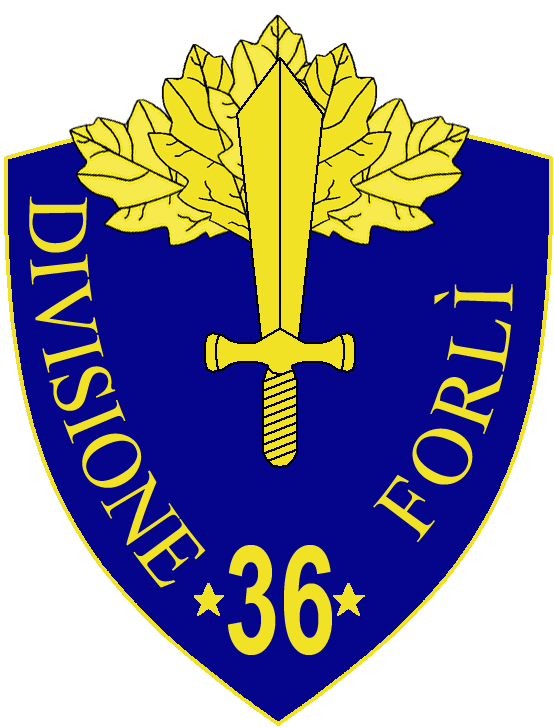
- 36th Infantry Division "Forlì" insignia
- Active: 1939–1943
- Country: Kingdom of Italy
- Branch: Royal Italian Army
- Type: Infantry
- Size: Division
- Garrison/HQ: Saluzzo
- Engagements: World War II

Commanders
- Notable commanders: Giulio Perugi

Insignia
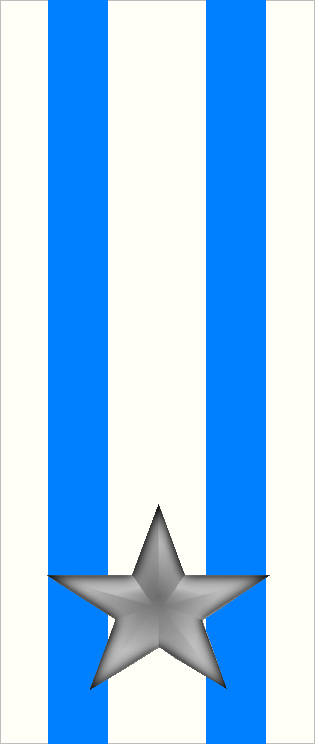
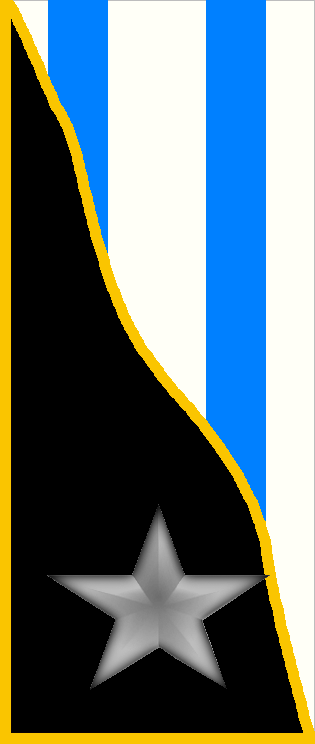
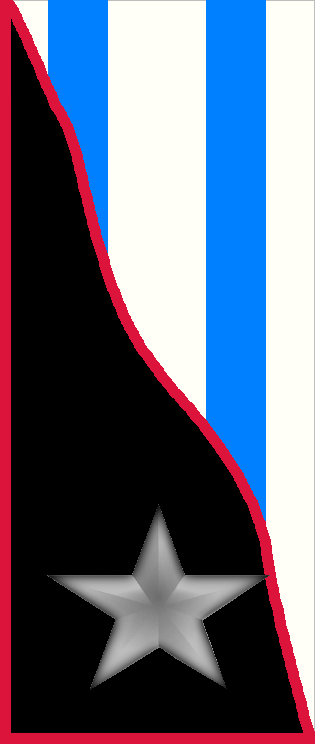
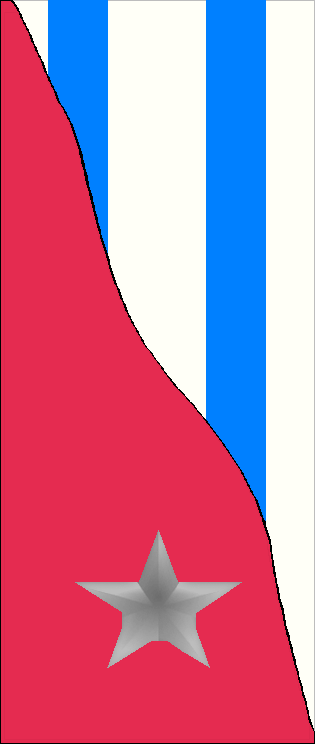
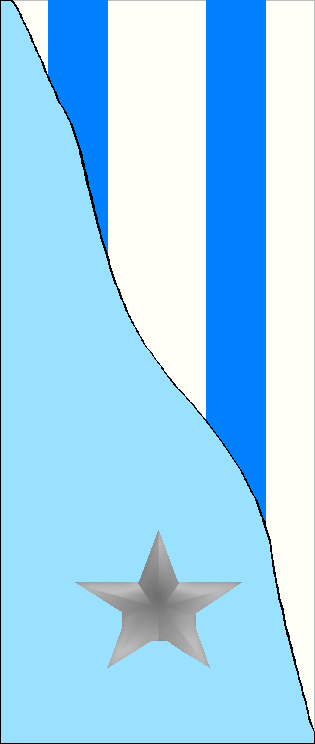
- Identification symbol: Forlì Division gorget patches

The 36th Infantry Division "Forlì" (Italian: 36ª Divisione di fanteria "Forlì") was a infantry division of the Royal Italian Army during World War II. The Forlì was a mountain-type infantry division, which meant that the division's artillery and logistics were moved by pack mules, while in standard infantry divisions artillery and logistics were moved by horse-drawn limbers and carriages. Italy's real mountain warfare divisions were the six alpine divisions manned by Alpini troops. The division was formed on 31 March 1939 and named for the city of Forlì. The division was based in Saluzzo and most of its troops were drafted in the surrounding Langhe region in southern Piedmont. The division's two infantry regiments were based in Alba (43rd) and Saluzzo (44th), with the division's artillery regiment also based in Saluzzo.

== History ==
The division's lineage begins with the XIII Brigade established on 24 June 1859 with the 23rd and 24th infantry regiments of the Army of the United Provinces of Central Italy. On 16 September 1859 the brigade received the name "Forlì". On 25 March 1860 the Brigade "Forlì" entered the Royal Sardinian Army three days after the Kingdom of Sardinia had annexed the United Provinces of Central Italy. Already before entering the Royal Sardinian Army the brigade's two infantry regiments had been renumbered on 30 December 1859 as 43rd Infantry Regiment and 44th Infantry Regiment.

=== World War I ===
The brigade fought on the Italian front in World War I. On 10 October 1926 the brigade assumed the name of III Infantry Brigade and received the 37th Infantry Regiment "Ravenna" from the disbanded Brigade "Ravenna". The brigade was the infantry component of the 3rd Territorial Division of Alessandria, which also included the 11th Field Artillery Regiment.

In 1930 the division exchanged the 44th Infantry Regiment "Forlì" for the 38th Infantry Regiment "Ravenna" with the 4th Territorial Division of Cuneo. In 1935 the division changed its name to 3rd Infantry Division "Monferrato". On 1 April 1934 the division exchanged the 38th Infantry Regiment "Ravenna" for 30th Infantry Regiment "Pisa" with the 26th Infantry Division "Assietta".

On 31 March 1939 the 36th Infantry Division "Forlì" was activated in Saluzzo and on the same day the 3rd Infantry Division "Monferrato" was renamed as 3rd Infantry Division "Ravenna", becoming thus the heir to the Brigade "Ravenna", while the traditions of the Brigade "Forlì" were passed to the newly activated 36th division. On the same day the Forlì received the 43rd Infantry Regiment "Forlì" from the Ravenna division and the 44th Infantry Regiment "Forlì" from the 4th Territorial Division of Cuneo. On 3 September 1939 the 36th Artillery Regiment was reformed in Saluzzo by the depot of the 11th Artillery Regiment "Ravenna" and assigned to the division.

=== World War II ===
On 10 June 1940 the Forlì was the part of the Italian 1st Army and took part in the Italian invasion of France. The division was initially deployed on the French border in defensive positions in the Argentera valley and between the Rocca Peroni and Monte Maniglia mountains. On 22 June 1940 the Forlì attacked towards Meyronnes and the road junction of La Condamine-Châtelard, after bypassing French defenders north of mount Tête de Viraysse, it took the forts of Bec du Lièvre and Tête Dure on 23 June. As result, the Forlì advanced rapidly that day and captured Malboisset, before stopping before the village of Larche at the news of the Franco-Italian Armistice.

In early 1941 the Forlì moved to Albania to augment the Italian forces fighting in the Greco-Italian War. On 12 February 1941 it entered the frontline west of Lake Ohrid, in the Librazhd-Kalivaç-Dunicë area and partly along the Shkumbin river. On 20 February the Greek army attacked the Forlì positions, focusing on mount Kosicës and the Kalivaç valley in Korçë municipality. On April 10, 1941, the Forlì went on the offensive as part of German-led Battle of Greece. The division attacked from Vloçisht to Gurisht. By 14 April 1941 it moved towards Leminot. When the Greek Army began to retreat due to the Germans' rapid advance in the east, and Forlì was able to reach Ersekë on 17 April 1941, where it stop at the Aoös river. After the Greek surrender the division was ordered to Larissa for occupation duties.

While the Forlì was on occupation duty in Greece the division's regimental depots in Italy raised the 154th Infantry Division "Murge": the depot of the 43rd Infantry Regiment "Forlì" raised the 259th Infantry Regiment "Murge", the depot of the 44th Infantry Regiment "Forlì" raised the 260th Infantry Regiment "Murge", and the depot of the 36th Artillery Regiment "Forlì" raised the 154th Artillery Regiment "Murge".

In August 1942 the Forlì was assigned occupation and coastal defence duties at Larissa, Volos and Lamia. In 1943, the Forlì has relocated further south, covering the Lamia – Amfikleia – Livadeia – Thebes and Attica area. Also, the Forlì was responsible for the control of the Euripus Strait, the island of Euboea and the area surrounding Athens.

On 5–6 March 1943, troops of the Forlì set the town of Servia on fire in retaliation for the defeat and capture of an Italian battalion at the Battle of Fardykambos by the Greek Resistance.

The Forlì surrendered to the German forces in Greece after the Armistice of Cassibile and was dissolved 16 September 1943.

== 343rd Infantry Regiment "Forlì" ==
On 1 November 1941 the regimental depot of the 16th Infantry Regiment "Savona" of the 55th Infantry Division "Savona" raised the 343rd Infantry Regiment "Forlì" in Cosenza. The regiment was meant to increase the Forlì's combat strength, but after spending 1942 as a coastal defense unit in Calabria the 343rd regiment was sent on 29 January 1943 to Albania, where it joined the 53rd Infantry Division "Arezzo".

== Organization ==
36th Infantry Division "Forlì" organization in 1940

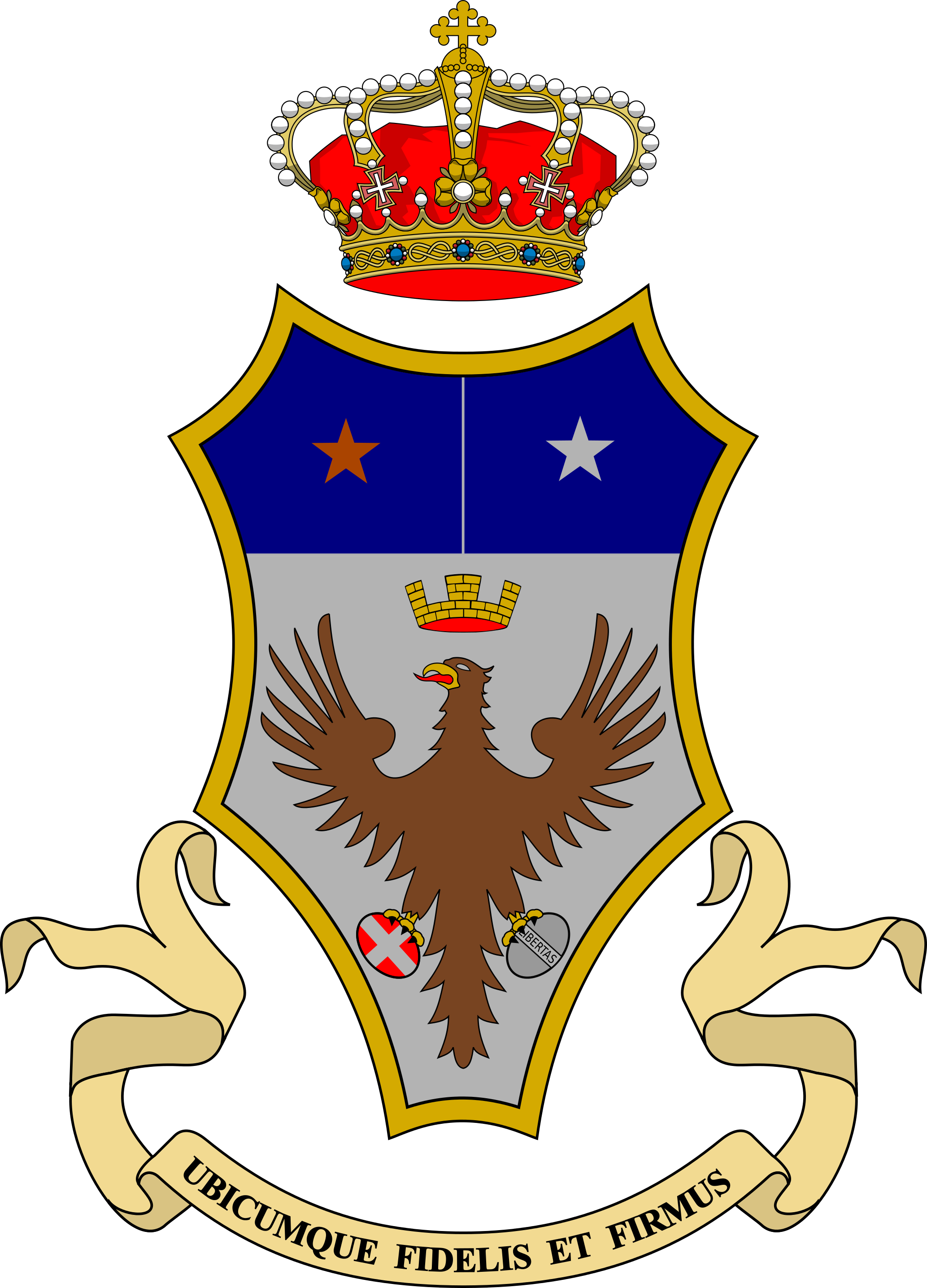
Coat of Arms of the 43rd Infantry Regiment "Forlì", 1939

- 36th Infantry Division "Forlì", in Saluzzo
  - Headquarters
    - Command Company
    - 9th Carabinieri Section
    - 12th Carabinieri Section
    - 38th Field Post Office
    - 36th Infantry Division Command Transport Squad
  - 43rd Infantry Regiment "Forlì", in Alba
    - Command Company
    - 3 × Fusilier battalions
    - Support Weapons Battery (65/17 mod. 13 infantry support guns)
    - Mortar Company (81mm mod. 35 mortars)
  - 44th Infantry Regiment "Forlì", in Saluzzo
    - Command Company
    - 3 × Fusilier battalions
    - Support Weapons Battery (65/17 mod. 13 infantry support guns)
    - Mortar Company (81mm mod. 35 mortars)
  - 343rd Infantry Regiment "Forlì" (raised 1 November 1941 in Cosenza, transferred to the 53rd Infantry Division "Arezzo" on 29 January 1943)
    - Command Company
    - 3 × Fusiliers battalions
    - Cannons Company (47/32 mod. 35 anti-tank guns)
    - Mortar Company (81mm mod. 35 mortars)
  - 36th Artillery Regiment "Forlì", in Saluzzo
    - Command Unit
    - I Group (75/27 mod. 11 field guns; transferred from the 17th Artillery Regiment "Sforzesca"; transferred on 2 February 1941 to the 25th Artillery Regiment "Assietta")
    - I Group (100/17 mod. 14 howitzers; transferred on 2 February 1941 from the 25th Artillery Regiment "Assietta")
    - II Group (75/27 mod. 11 field guns; transferred from the 28th Artillery Regiment "Livorno")
    - III Group (75/13 mod. 15 mountain guns; formed by the depot of the 11th Artillery Regiment "Ravenna")
    - 1 × Anti-aircraft battery (20/65 mod. 35 anti-aircraft guns)
    - Ammunition and Supply Unit
  - XXXVI Mortar Battalion (81mm mod. 35 mortars)
  - 36th Anti-tank Company (47/32 mod. 35 anti-tank guns)
  - 36th Telegraph and Radio Operators Company
  - 66th Engineer Company
  - 23rd Medical Section
    - 3 × Field hospitals
    - 1 × Surgical unit
  - 24th Supply Section
  - 36th Transport Section (replaced at the end of 1940 by the 347th Transport Section)
  - 74th Train Unit (equipped with mules)

Attached to the division from June 1940 to 31 November 1941:

- LXXX CC.NN. Battalion

Attached to the division from 1 December 1941 until 1942:

- 112th CC.NN. Legion "Dell’Urbe"
  - CXII CC.NN. (remained attached to the division until September 1943)
  - CXX CC.NN. Battalion
  - 112th CC.NN. Machine Gun Company

Attached to the division during its stay in Attica:

- 3rd Regiment "Granatieri di Sardegna e d'Albania"
  - Command Company
  - 3x Grenadier battalions
  - Support Weapons Battery (65/17 mod. 13 infantry support guns)
  - Mortar Company (81mm mod. 35 mortars)
- XVII Bersaglieri Battalion, 2nd Bersaglieri Regiment
- XXVI Machine Gun Battalion
- CDLXXIX Coastal Infantry Battalion
- CDLXXX Coastal Infantry Battalion
- II Group (105/28 cannons; formed by the 1st Army Corps Artillery Regiment)
- XIV Group (105/28 cannons; formed by the 8th Army Corps Artillery Regiment)
- XXXIII Group (105/28 cannons; formed by the 9th Army Corps Artillery Regiment)

Attached temporarily to the division in 1943:

- Regiment "Lancieri di Milano"
  - Command Squadron
  - I Squadrons Group
    - 2 × Lancer Squadrons
    - Machine Gun Platoon
  - II Squadrons Group
    - 2 × Lancer Squadrons
    - Machine Gun Platoon
  - Tank Platoon (L3/33 tankettes)
- 3rd Army Corps Artillery Grouping
  - CVII Group (149/13 heavy howitzers)
  - CVIII Group (149/13 heavy howitzers)
- CCXXXIV Mobile Territorial Battalion (Reserve unit)
- XLI Group (105/28 cannons; formed by the 1st Army Corps Artillery Regiment)
- XCI Army Artillery Group

== Commanding officers ==
The division's commanding officers were:

- Generale di Divisione Gabriele Nasci (5 April 1939 – 22 September 1939)
- Generale di Divisione Giulio Perugi (22 September 1939 - 31 September 1940)
- Generale di Divisione Giunio Ruggiero (1 October 1940 - 14 November 1942)
- Generale di Brigata Antonio Franceschini (15 November 1942 - 3 March 1943)
- Generale di Brigata Francesco Antonio Arena (4 March 1943 - 16 September 1943)

== CROWCASS ==
The names of four men attached to the division can be found in the Central Registry of War Criminals and Security Suspects (CROWCASS) set up by the Anglo-American Supreme Headquarters Allied Expeditionary Force in 1945. The names can be found at: Central Registry of War Criminals and Security Suspects from the Kingdom of Italy.
