= Betz, Oise =

Betz
- Commune
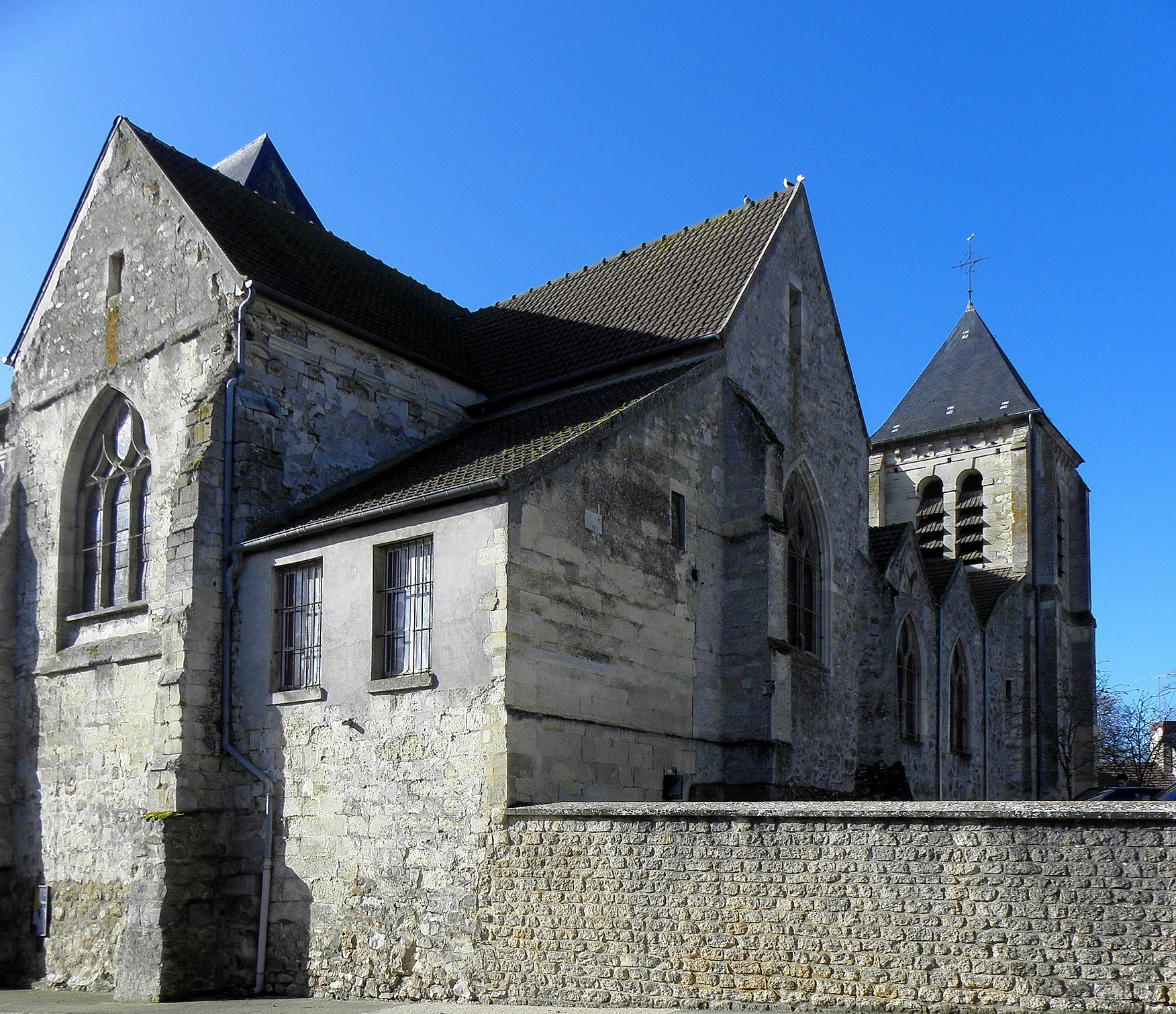
- The church in Betz
- Location of Betz
- Location within France Location within Hauts-de-France
- Coordinates: 49°09′27″N 2°57′22″E
- Country: France
- Region: Hauts-de-France
- Department: Oise
- Arrondissement: Senlis
- Canton: Nanteuil-le-Haudouin
- Intercommunality: Pays de Valois

Government
  - Mayor (2021–2026): Maryline Dolleans
- Area^{1}: 15.39 km^{2} (5.94 sq mi)
- Elevation: 103 m (338 ft)
- Highest elevation: 140 m (460 ft)
- Lowest elevation: 87 m (285 ft)
- Population (2023): 1,100
  - Density: 71/km^{2} (190/sq mi)
- Time zone: UTC+01:00 (CET)
  - Summer (DST): UTC+02:00 (CEST)
- INSEE/Postal code: 60069 /60620
- ^{1} French Land Register data, which excludes lakes, ponds, glaciers > 1 km^{2} (0.386 sq mi or 247 acres) and river estuaries.

Betz (French pronunciation: [bɛ]) is a commune in the Oise department in northern France. The Moroccan King Mohammed VI owns a 71ha palace there, where he is said to employ much of the commune's population.

== Population ==
Historical population
Year	Pop.	±% p.a.
1968	457	—
1975	531	+2.17%
1982	640	+2.70%
1990	871	+3.93%
1999	934	+0.78%
2007	1,019	+1.09%
2012	1,091	+1.37%
2017	1,161	+1.25%
2023	1,100	−0.90%
Source: INSEE

== See also ==
- Communes of the Oise department
