= Meyronnes =

- Part of Val-d'Oronaye
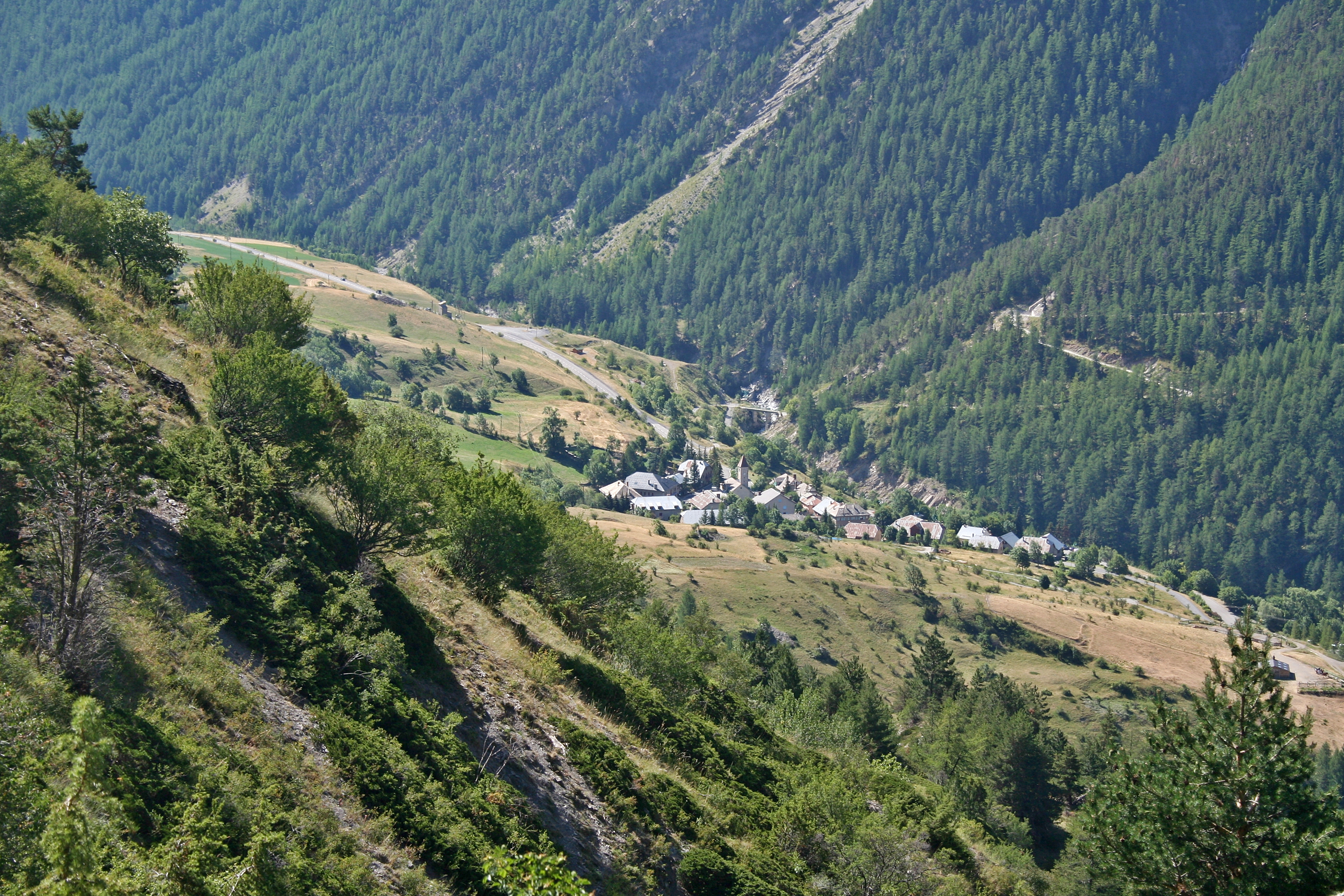
- The village of Meyronnes, in the Ubayette valley
- Location of Meyronnes
- Location within France Location within Provence-Alpes-Côte d'Azur
- Coordinates: 44°28′38″N 6°48′00″E
- Country: France
- Region: Provence-Alpes-Côte d'Azur
- Department: Alpes-de-Haute-Provence
- Arrondissement: Barcelonnette
- Canton: Barcelonnette
- Commune: Val-d'Oronaye
- Area^{1}: 40.59 km^{2} (15.67 sq mi)
- Elevation: 1,500 m (4,900 ft)
- Highest elevation: 3,192 m (10,472 ft)
- Lowest elevation: 1,307 m (4,288 ft)
- Population (2021): 58
  - Density: 1.4/km^{2} (3.7/sq mi)
- Time zone: UTC+01:00 (CET)
  - Summer (DST): UTC+02:00 (CEST)
- Postal code: 04530
- ^{1} French Land Register data, which excludes lakes, ponds, glaciers > 1 km^{2} (0.386 sq mi or 247 acres) and river estuaries.

Meyronnes (French pronunciation: [meʁɔn]; Vivaro-Alpine: Maironas) is a former commune in the Alpes-de-Haute-Provence department in southeastern France. On 1 January 2016, it was merged into the new commune Val-d'Oronaye.

== Population ==
Historical population

| Year | Pop. | ±% p.a. |
|---|---|---|
| 1793 | 554 | — |
| 1800 | 554 | +0.00% |
| 1806 | 541 | −0.39% |
| 1821 | 515 | −0.33% |
| 1831 | 605 | +1.62% |
| 1836 | 651 | +1.48% |
| 1841 | 608 | −1.36% |
| 1846 | 574 | −1.14% |
| 1851 | 558 | −0.56% |
| 1856 | 526 | −1.17% |
| 1861 | 499 | −1.05% |
| 1866 | 547 | +1.85% |
| 1872 | 476 | −2.29% |
| 1876 | 417 | −3.25% |
| 1881 | 388 | −1.43% |
| 1886 | 499 | +5.16% |
| 1891 | 355 | −6.58% |

| Year | Pop. | ±% p.a. |
|---|---|---|
| 1896 | 347 | −0.45% |
| 1901 | 347 | +0.00% |
| 1906 | 349 | +0.12% |
| 1911 | 324 | −1.48% |
| 1921 | 264 | −2.03% |
| 1926 | 197 | −5.69% |
| 1931 | 212 | +1.48% |
| 1936 | 177 | −3.54% |
| 1954 | 54 | −6.38% |
| 1962 | 32 | −6.33% |
| 1968 | 31 | −0.53% |
| 1975 | 46 | +5.80% |
| 1982 | 31 | −5.48% |
| 1990 | 48 | +5.62% |
| 1999 | 44 | −0.96% |
| 2021 | 58 | +1.26% |

Source: EHESS and INSEE

== See also ==
- Ouvrage Saint Ours Haut
- Ubaye Valley
- Communes of the Alpes-de-Haute-Provence department
