= Larche, Alpes-de-Haute-Provence =

Larche
- Part of Val-d'Oronaye
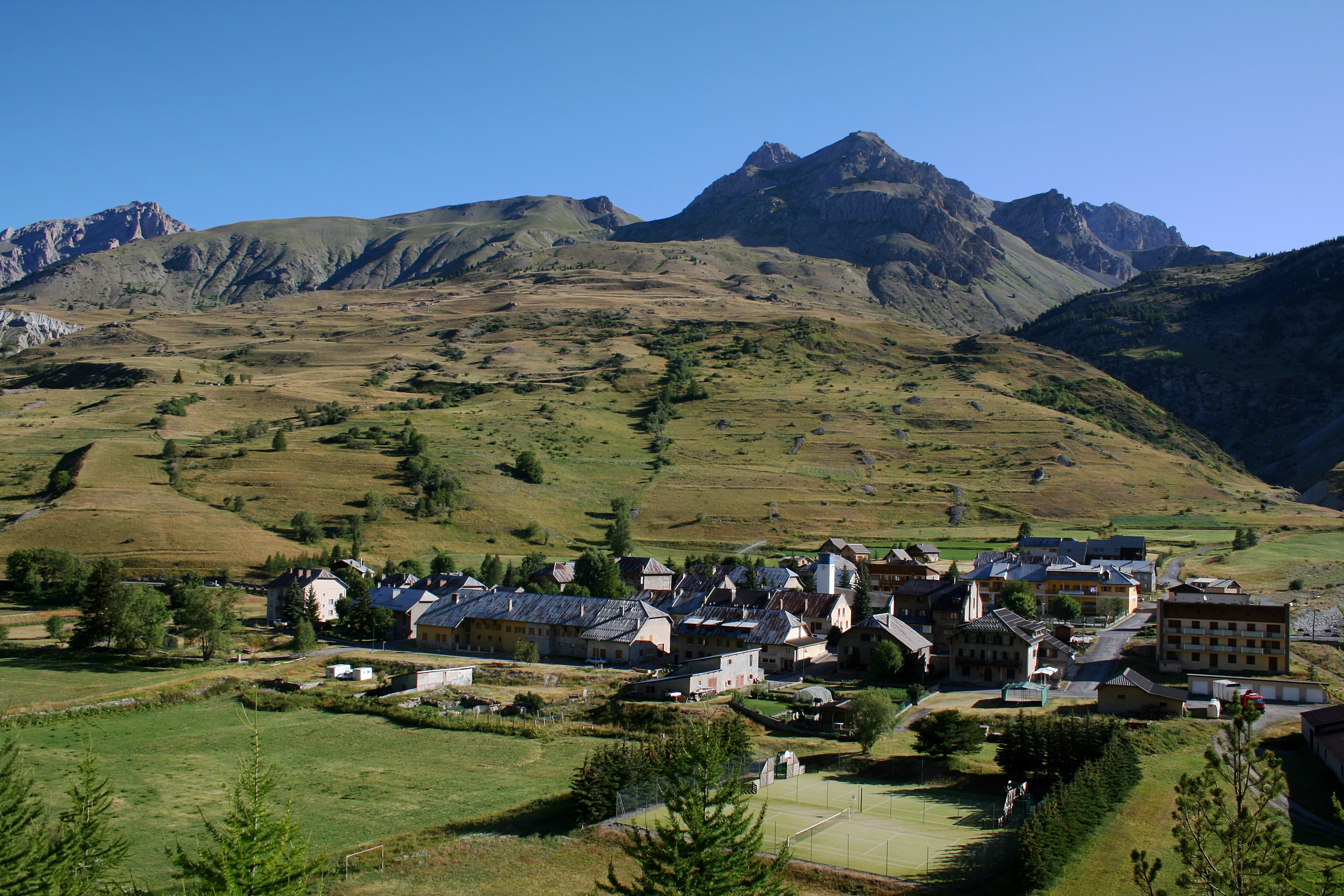
- A general view of the village of Larche
- Location of Larche
- Location within France Location within Provence-Alpes-Côte d'Azur
- Coordinates: 44°27′08″N 6°50′50″E
- Country: France
- Region: Provence-Alpes-Côte d'Azur
- Department: Alpes-de-Haute-Provence
- Arrondissement: Barcelonnette
- Canton: Barcelonnette
- Commune: Val-d'Oronaye
- Area^{1}: 68.86 km^{2} (26.59 sq mi)
- Elevation: 1,697 m (5,568 ft)
- Highest elevation: 3,165 m (10,384 ft)
- Lowest elevation: 1,606 m (5,269 ft)
- Population (2021): 50
  - Density: 0.73/km^{2} (1.9/sq mi)
- Time zone: UTC+01:00 (CET)
  - Summer (DST): UTC+02:00 (CEST)
- Postal code: 04530
- ^{1} French Land Register data, which excludes lakes, ponds, glaciers > 1 km^{2} (0.386 sq mi or 247 acres) and river estuaries.

Larche (French pronunciation: [laʁʃ]; Vivaro-Alpine: L'Archa) is a former commune in the Alpes-de-Haute-Provence department in southeastern France. On 1 January 2016, it was merged into the new commune Val-d'Oronaye.

== Geography ==
It lies on the northwestern foot of the Maddalena Pass, called Col de Larche in French.

== Population ==
Historical population

Year	Pop.	±% p.a.
1793	679	—
1800	848	+3.23%
1806	747	−2.09%
1821	784	+0.32%
1831	789	+0.06%
1836	788	−0.03%
1841	738	−1.30%
1846	677	−1.71%
1851	700	+0.67%
1856	672	−0.81%
1861	677	+0.15%
1866	650	−0.81%
1872	665	+0.38%
1876	645	−0.76%
1881	615	−0.95%
1886	787	+5.06%
1891	552	−6.85%

Year	Pop.	±% p.a.
1896	576	+0.85%
1901	558	−0.63%
1906	587	+1.02%
1911	552	−1.22%
1921	377	−3.74%
1926	362	−0.81%
1931	299	−3.75%
1936	267	−2.24%
1954	151	−3.12%
1962	102	−4.79%
1968	128	+3.86%
1975	100	−3.47%
1982	91	−1.34%
1990	71	−3.05%
1999	83	+1.75%
2021	50	−2.28%

Source: EHESS and INSEE

== See also ==
- Ubaye Valley
- Communes of the Alpes-de-Haute-Provence department
