= Maddalena Pass =

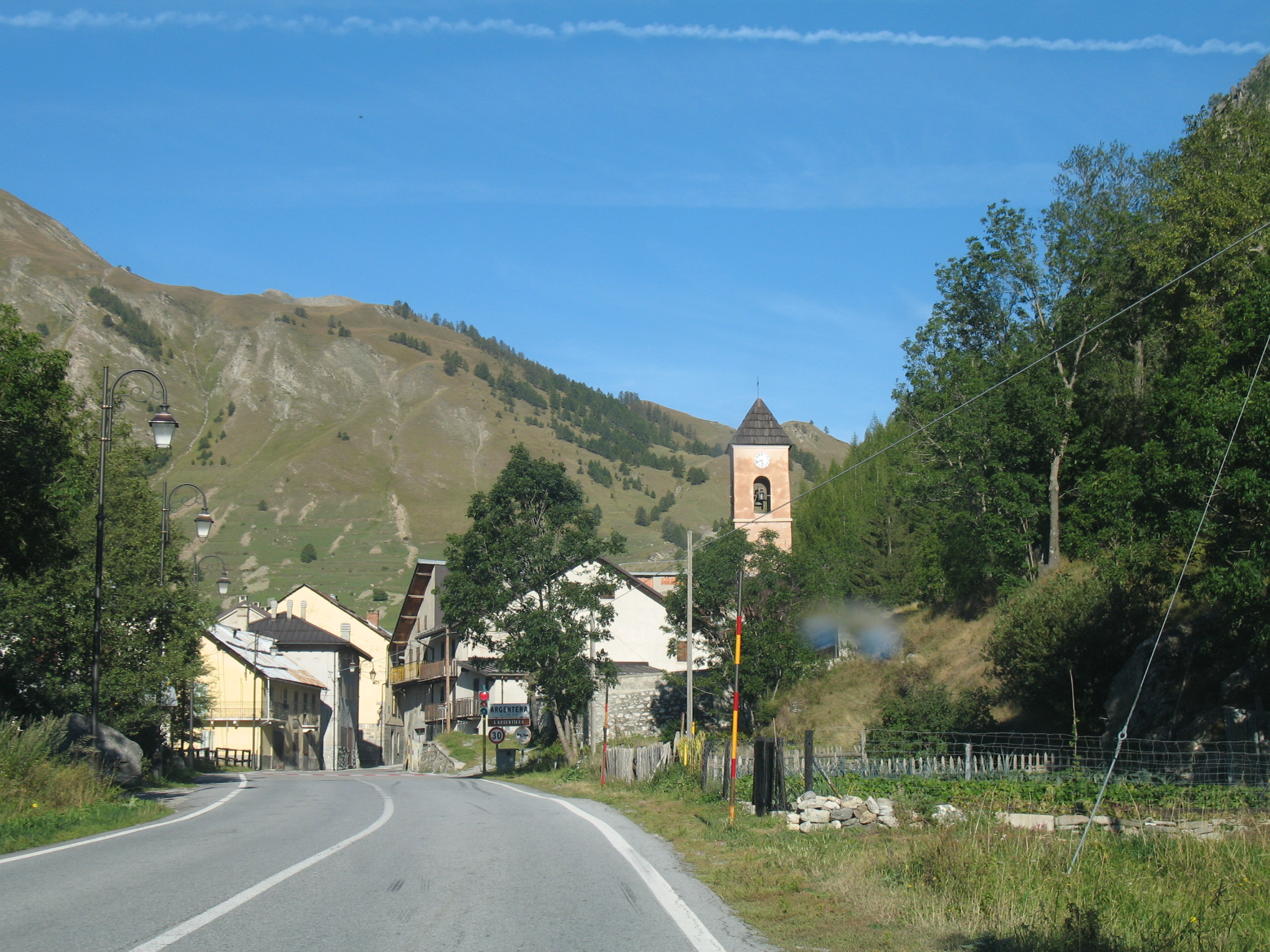
- The village Argentera near Maddalena Pass

- Location within Alps
- Elevation: 1,996 metres (6,549 ft)

Third Approach
- Location: Alpes-de-Haute-Provence, France / Province of Cuneo, Italy
- Range: Cottian Alps and Maritime Alps
- Coordinates: 44°25′18″N 6°53′55″E

The Maddalena Pass (Italian: Colle della Maddalena; French: Col de Larche, historically Col de l'Argentière) (elevation 1996 m.) is a high mountain pass between the Cottian Alps and the Maritime Alps, located on the border between Italy and France. It connects Barcelonnette in France with Cuneo in Italy. Its French name Col de Larche refers to the village Larche on its northwestern side.

Under its earlier name, Col de l'Argentière it has historically linked Lyon with Italy; the Col de l'Argentière was in the possession of the house of Savoy from 1388 to 1713, offering an easy route between Piedmont and its outlying valley of Barcelonnette, which came into Savoyard possession in 1388, when Amadeus VI of Savoy purchased it for the sum of 60,000 ecus, it was of such strategic and commercial importance.

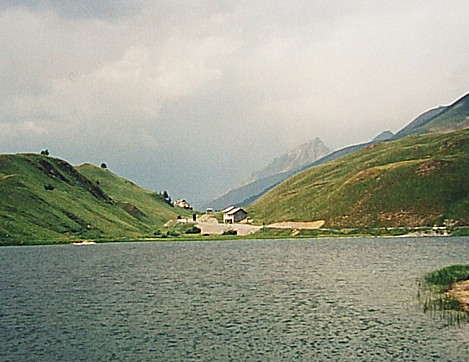
Lago della Maddalena

A few hundred metres from the pass, on its Italian side, is the Lago della Maddalena, which is the source of the Stura di Demonte, an important tributary of the Tanaro.

== See also ==
- List of highest paved roads in Europe
- List of mountain passes
