= List of botanical gardens in France =

This list of botanical gardens in France is intended to contain all significant botanical gardens and arboretums in France.

== Ain ==
- Arboretum de Cormoranche sur Saône, Cormoranche-sur-Saône
- Parc botanique de la Teyssonnière, Buellas

== Aisne ==
- Arboretum de Craonne, Craonne
- Arboretum de Septmonts, Septmonts
- Arboretum de Vauclair
- Espace Pierres Folles, St Jean des Vignes (Soissons)
- Jardins du Nouveau Monde, Blérancourt

== Allier ==
- Arboretum de Balaine, Villeneuve-sur-Allier
- Arboretum de l'Ile de la Ronde, Saint-Pourçain-sur-Sioule
- Arboretum et parc de la Rigolée, Avermes
- Arboretum Paul Barge, Ferrières-sur-Sichon
- Parc floral et arboré de la Chènevière, Abrest

== Alpes-de-Haute-Provence ==
- Jardin botanique des Cordeliers, Digne-les-Bains
- Jardins de Salagon, Mane

== Alpes-Maritimes ==
- Arboretum du Sarroudier, Le Mas
- Arboretum Marcel Kroenlein, Roure
- Jardin botanique de la Villa Thuret, Antibes
- Jardin botanique exotique de Menton (Jardin botanique exotique du Val Rahmeh), Menton
- Jardin botanique d'Èze, Èze
- Jardin botanique "Les Cèdres", Saint-Jean-Cap-Ferrat
- Jardin botanique La Leonina, Beaulieu-sur-Mer
- Jardin botanique de la Ville de Nice, Nice
- Jardin Serre de la Madone, Menton
- Station d'Acclimatation Botanique, La Colle-sur-Loup

== Ardennes ==
- Arboretum d'Élan, Élan
- Arboretum de Guignicourt-sur-Vence, Guignicourt-sur-Vence
- Arboretum de Matton-Clémency, Matton-et-Clémency
- Arboretum de la Pipe Qui Fume, Bogny-sur-Meuse
- Arboretum de Vendresse, Vendresse
- Jardin botanique de Sedan, Sedan

== Ariège ==
- Les Épines de Lespinet, Foix
- Le Parc aux Bambous, Lapenne

== Aube ==
- Arboretum Saint-Antoine, Ervy-le-Châtel
- Jardin botanique de Marnay-sur-Seine, Marnay-sur-Seine

== Aude ==
- Arboretum du Lampy, Saissac
- Arboretum du Planel, Arques
- Arboretum de Villardebelle, Villardebelle
- Cactuseraie d'Escaïre-Figue, Montolieu
- Épanchoir de Foucaud, Pennautier
- Jardin aux Plantes la Bouichère, Limoux
- Jardin botanique Méditerrannéen, Durban-Corbières

== Aveyron ==
- Jardin botanique d'Aubrac, Saint-Chély-d'Aubrac
- Jardin botanique des Causses, Millau
- Jardin botanique de Saint Xist, Le Clapier

== Bas-Rhin ==
- Jardin botanique du col de Saverne, Saverne
- Jardin botanique de l'Université de Strasbourg, Strasbourg

== Bouches-du-Rhône ==
- Jardin botanique E.M. Heckel, Marseille
- Parc du Mugel, La Ciotat

== Calvados ==
- Jardin botanique de Bayeux, Bayeux
- Jardin botanique de Caen, Caen

== Cantal ==
- Arboretum d'Arpajon-sur-Cère, Arpajon-sur-Cère

== Charente ==
- Arboretum du Chêne-Vert, Chabanais
- Arboretum Jean Aubouin, Combiers
- Sentier botanique de Soyaux, Soyaux

== Charente-Maritime ==
- Conservatoire du Bégonia, Rochefort
- Jardin des plantes de La Rochelle, La Rochelle
- Parc botanique Deau, Saint-André-de-Lidon
- Parc Jardins du Monde, Royan

== Cher ==
- Conservatoire national du Pélargonium, Bourges
- Pépinières Arboretum Adeline, La Chapelle-Montlinard

== Corrèze ==
- Arboretum de Chamberet, Chamberet
- Arboretum de la Tuillère, Ayen
- Arboretum du Massif des Agriers, Eygurande
- Arboretum du Puy Chabrol, Meymac
- Parc Arboretum de Saint-Setiers, Saint-Setiers

== Southern Corsica ==
- Arboretum des Milelli, Ajaccio

== Côte-d'Or ==
- Jardin botanique de l'Arquebuse, Dijon
- Jardin botanique textile, Flavigny-sur-Ozerain
- Serres de l'Université de Bourgogne, Dijon

== Creuse ==
- Arboretum du Puy de Jaule, La Courtine-le-Trucq
- Arboretum de la Sédelle - Crozant

== Deux-Sèvres ==
- Arboretum du Chemin de la Découverte, Melle

== Dordogne ==
- Arboretum de Podestat, Bergerac
- Arboretum des Pouyouleix, Saint-Jory-de-Chalais
- Jardin botanique d'Alaije, Brantôme
- Jardin botanique des oiseaux, Saint-Barthélemy-de-Bussière
- Jardin de Planbuisson, Le Buisson-de-Cadouin
- Jardin Musée de Limeuil, Limeuil
- Jardins d'Eau, Carsac-Aillac
- Parc botanique de Neuvic, Neuvic-Sur-L'Isle

== Doubs ==
- Jardin botanique de Besançon, Besançon
- Jardin Paléobotanique, Soulce-Cernay

== Drôme ==
- Jardin des Arômes, Nyons

== Essonne ==
- Arboretum de Segrez, Saint-Sulpice-de-Favières
- Arboretum municipal de Verrières-le-Buisson, Verrières-le-Buisson
- Arboretum Vilmorin, Verrières-le-Buisson
- Conservatoire National des Plantes à Parfum, Médicinales, Aromatiques et Industrielles, Milly-la-Forêt
- Parc botanique de Launay, Orsay

== Eure ==
- Arboretum d'Harcourt, Harcourt

== Finistère ==
- Arboretum du Cranou, Saint-Eloy
- Poërop Arboretum, Huelgoat
- Conservatoire botanique national de Brest, Brest
- Jardin botanique de l'Hôpital d'Instruction des Armées Clermont-Tonnerre, Brest
- Jardin botanique des Montagnes Noires, Spezet
- Jardin Exotique de Roscoff, Roscoff
- Jardin Georges Delaselle, Île de Batz
- Parc botanique de Cornouaille, Combrit
- Parc botanique de Suscinio, Morlaix

== Gard ==
- Arboretum de Cazebonne, Alzon
- Arboretum de la Foux, Le Vigan
- Arboretum de l'Hort de Dieu, Le Vigan
- Arboretum de Puéchagut, Bréau-et-Salagosse
- Arboretum de Saint-Sauveur-des-Pourcils, Saint-Sauveur-Camprieu
- Arboretum Sainte-Anastasie, Sainte-Anastasie
- Bambouseraie de Prafrance, Anduze
- Jardins ethnobotaniques de la Gardie, Rousson
- Parc botanique de la Tour Vieille, Alès

== Gers ==
- Jardins de Coursiana, La Romieu
- Nature et Paysages (Jardin Carnivore), Peyrusse-Massas

== Gironde ==
- Jardin botanique de Bordeaux, Bordeaux
- Jardin botanique de la Bastide, Bordeaux
- Jardin botanique de Talence, Talence
- Château de Mongenan in Portets

== Guadeloupe ==
- Jardin botanique de Deshaies, Deshaies
- Jardin exotique du Fort Napoléon, Terre-de-Haut

== French Guiana ==
- Jardin botanique de Cayenne, Cayenne

== Hautes-Alpes ==
- Arboretum Robert Ruffier-Lanche, Saint-Martin-d'Hères
- Conservatoire botanique national alpin de Gap-Charance, Gap
- Jardin botanique alpin du Lautaret, Villar-d'Arêne

== Haute-Garonne ==
- Arboretum de Jouéou, Bagnères-de-Luchon
- Arboretum de Cardeilhac, Cardeilhac
- Jardin botanique de Toulouse, Toulouse
- Jardin botanique Henri Gaussen, Toulouse
- Jardin botanique pyrénéen de Melles, Melles

== Haute-Loire ==
- Arboretum de l'Hermet, Riotord
- Arboretum de Charvols, Malvières
- Jardin botanique montagnard, Mazet-Saint-Voy

== Haute-Marne ==
- Arboretum de Montmorency, Bourbonne-les-Bains

== Hautes-Pyrénées ==
- Arboretum de Tournay, Tournay
- Conservatoire botanique Pyrénéen, Bagnères-de-Bigorre
- Jardin botanique du Tourmalet, Barèges

== Haute-Saône ==
- Arboretum de la Cude, Mailleroncourt-Charette
- Arboretum du Ru de Rôge, Fougerolles
- Parc botanique du Château d'Ouge, Ouge
- Parc de l'Étang, Battrans

== Haute-Savoie ==
- Arboretum de Ripaille, Thonon-les-Bains
- Jaÿsinia, Samoëns

== Haute-Vienne ==
- Arboretum de la Jonchère, La Jonchère-Saint-Maurice
- Jardin botanique de l'Evêché (Jardin botanique de Limoges), Limoges

== Haut-Rhin ==
- Parc Zoologique et Botanique de Mulhouse, Mulhouse

== Hauts-de-Seine ==
- Arboretum de la Vallée-aux-Loups, Châtenay-Malabry

== Hérault ==
- Arboretum du Figuier, Nézignan-l'Évêque
- Arboretum du Grenouillet, Gorniès
- Arboretum du Mas du Rouquet, Pégairolles-de-l'Escalette
- Cactus Park, Bessan
- Jardin botanique de la Font de Bézombes, Saint-André-de-Sangonis
- Jardin botanique du Puech, Le Puech
- Jardin des plantes de Montpellier, Montpellier
- La Serre Amazonienne, Montpellier

== Ille-et-Vilaine ==
- Jardin botanique de l'Université de Rennes, Rennes
- Jardin botanique du Thabor, Rennes
- Jardin botanique de Haute-Bretagne, Le Châtellier

== Indre-et-Loire ==
- Arboretum de la Petite Loiterie, Monthodon
- Jardin botanique de Tours, Tours
- Parcours botanique au fil de l'Indre, Montbazon

== Isère ==
- Arboretum Robert Ruffier-Lanche, Grenoble-Saint-Martin-d'Hères
- Arboretum de Combe Noire, La Mure
- Arboretum du Val d'Ainan, Saint-Geoire-en-Valdaine

== Jura ==
- Arboretum de Chevreuil, Supt
- Espace botanique du Frasnois, Le Frasnois

== Loire ==
- Arboretum des Grands Murcins, Arcon
- Jardin botanique de Saint-Chamond, Saint-Chamond

== Loire-Atlantique ==
- Jardin des plantes de Nantes, Nantes

== Loiret ==
- Arboretum national des Barres, Nogent-sur-Vernisson
- Arboretum des Grandes Bruyères, Ingrannes
- Arboretum des Prés des Culands, Meung-sur-Loire

== Loir-et-Cher ==
- Arboretum de la Fosse, Fontaine-les-Coteaux
- Parc botanique de la Fosse, Fontaine-les-Coteaux
- Parc botanique du Prieuré d'Orchaise, Orchaise

== Lozère ==
- Arboretum Curie (Arboretum du Col des Trois Soeurs), La Panouse
- Arboretum de Born, Le Born

== Maine-et-Loire ==
- Arboretum Gaston Allard, Angers
- Camifolia, Chemillé
- Jardin des Plantes d'Angers, Angers
- Jardin botanique de Briollay, Briollay
- Jardin botanique de la Faculté de Pharmacie d'Angers, Angers
- Parc Oriental de Maulévrier, Maulévrier
- Terra Botanica, Angers

== Manche ==
- Jardin botanique de la Roche Fauconnière, Cherbourg
- Jardin botanique du Château de Vauville, Vauville

== Marne ==
- Jardin botanique de la Presle, Nanteuil-la-Forêt

== Martinique ==
- Balata Garden, Fort-de-France

== Mayenne ==
- Arboretum de Montsûrs, Montsûrs
- Jardin botanique de la Perrine, Laval

== Meurthe-et-Moselle ==
- Arboretum de Bellefontaine, Champigneulles
- Arboretum d'Amance, Champenoux
- Arboretum de l'Abiétinée, Malzéville
- Arboretum de la Sivrite, Vandœuvre-lès-Nancy
- Jardin botanique du Montet, Villers-lès-Nancy
- Jardin Dominique Alexandre Godron, Nancy

== Meuse ==
- Arboretum du Petit-Bois, Montfaucon d'Argonne
- Arboretum de Varennes-en-Argonne, Varennes-en-Argonne
- Arboretum de Vaucouleurs

== Morbihan ==
- Arboretum de Camors, Camors
- Jardin botanique Yves Rocher de La Gacilly, La Gacilly
- Zoo and Botanical Garden of Branféré, Le Guerno
- Parc botanique de Kerbihan, Hennebont

== Moselle ==
- Jardin botanique de Metz, Montigny-lès-Metz

== Nièvre ==
- Herbularium du Morvan, Saint-Brisson

== Nord ==
- Arboretum de l'Étang David, Locquignol
- Jardin botanique de la Faculté de Pharmacie, Lille
- Jardin botanique de Tourcoing, Tourcoing
- Jardin botanique du Val d'Yser, Quaëdypre
- Jardin botanique Nicolas Boulay, Lille
- Jardin des Plantes de Lille, Lille
- Jardin des Plantes Sauvages du Conservatoire botanique national de Bailleul, Bailleul
- Parc Arboretum du Manoir aux Loups, Halluin

== Orne ==
- Arboretum de l'Étoile des Andaines, Champsecret
- Arboretum de Boiscorde, Rémalard en Perche
- Botanical Garden of Le Bois du Puits, Belforêt-en-Perche
- La Perrière botanical garden, Belforêt-en-Perche
- La Petite Rochelle, Rémalard en Perche

== Paris ==
- Arboretum de l'École du Breuil
- Jardin Botanique, Université Paris V
- Jardin botanique de la Ville de Paris
- Jardin des Plantes
- Jardin des Serres d'Auteuil

== Pas-de-Calais ==
- Arboretum de Boulogne, Boulogne-sur-Mer
- Arboretum d'Olhain, Fresnicourt-le-Dolmen
- Arboretum de Tigny-Noyelle, Tigny-Noyelle
- Jardin botanique Floralpina, Arras

== Puy-de-Dôme ==
- Arboretum de Royat, Royat
- Jardin botanique d'Auvergne (Jardin botanique d'essais de Royat-Charade), Royat
- Jardin botanique de la Charme, Clermont-Ferrand

== Pyrénées-Atlantiques ==
- Jardin botanique de Bayonne (Jardin botanique des Remparts), Bayonne
- Jardin botanique des Pyrénées occidentales, Saint-Jammes
- Jardin botanique littoral Paul Jovet, Saint-Jean-de-Luz

== Pyrénées-Orientales ==
- Arboretum de Font-Romeu, Font-Romeu
- Arboretum de Saint Guillem, Prats-de-Mollo-la-Preste
- Jardin ethnobotanique d'Eyne, Eyne
- Jardin exotique de Ponteilla, Ponteilla
- Village arboretum de Vernet-les-Bains, Vernet-les-Bains

== Réunion ==
- Conservatoire botanique national de Mascarin, Saint-Leu
- Jardin de l'État, Saint-Denis

== Rhône ==
- Jardin botanique de Lyon (Jardin botanique du Parc de la Tête d'Or), Lyon

== Saône-et-Loire ==
- Arboretum de Pézanin, Dompierre-les-Ormes
- Jardin géo-botanique, Chalon-sur-Saône
- Parc archéologique et botanique de Solutré, Solutré-Pouilly

== Sarthe ==
- Arboretum de la Grand Prée, Le Mans
- Arboretum des Quintes, Laigné-en-Belin
- Arboretum du Rosay, Sablé-sur-Sarthe
- Arboretum Saint-Jean-de-la-Motte, Saint-Jean-de-la-Motte
- Jardin des Plantes du Mans, Le Mans

== Savoie ==
- Jardin botanique de Mont Cenis, Lanslebourg-Mont-Cenis

== Seine-Maritime ==
- Arboretum de Forêt Verte, Houppeville
- Arboretum du parc de Rouelles, Montivilliers
- Le Jardin Jungle Karlostachys, Eu
- Jardin des Plantes de Rouen, Rouen

== Seine-Saint-Denis ==
- Parc Arboretum de Montfermeil, Montfermeil

== Somme ==
- Arboretum de Samara, La Chaussée-Tirancourt
- Jardins de Valloires, Argoules
- Parc et Roseraie du Château de Rambures, Rambures

== Tarn ==
- Arboretum de Calmels, Lacaune
- Jardin botanique Pierre Fabre "La Michonne", Castres
- Jardins des Martels, Giroussens
- Jardin des Paradis, Cordes-sur-Ciel

== Val-de-Marne ==
- Arboretum de l'école du Breuil, Vincennes
- Jardin botanique de l'École nationale vétérinaire d'Alfort, Maisons-Alfort

== Val-d'Oise ==
- Arboretum de La Roche-Guyon, La Roche-Guyon
- Jardin botanique de Sannois des Plantes Médicinales, Sannois

== Var ==
- Arboretum de Gratteloup, Bormes-les-Mimosas
- Arboretum du Ruscas, Bormes-les-Mimosas
- Arboretum du Treps, Collobrières
- Conservatoire botanique national méditerranéen de Porquerolles, Porquerolles
- Domaine d'Orvès, La Valette du Var
- Domaine du Rayol (Parc botanique à Rayol-Canadel-sur-Mer), Rayol-Canadel-sur-Mer
- Jardin d'acclimatation du Mourillon, Toulon
- Jardin d'Oiseaux Tropicaux, La Londe-les-Maures
- Parc du Moulin Blanc, Saint-Zacharie

== Vaucluse ==
- Arboretum du Font de l'Orme, Mérindol
- Harmas de Fabre, Sérignan-du-Comtat

== Vendée ==
- Arboretum de Saint-Avaugourd-des-Landes, Moutiers-les-Mauxfaits
- Arboretum du Puy du Fou, Les Epesses
- Jardin des Olfacties, Coëx

== Vienne ==
- Arboretum de Neuville-de-Poitou, Neuville-de-Poitou
- Jardin botanique et verger de La Bussière, La Bussière
- Jardin botanique universitaire de Poitiers, Mignaloux-Beauvoir
- Jardin des Plantes de Poitiers, Poitiers

== Vosges ==
- Arboretum de Bains-les-Bains, Bains-les-Bains
- Arboretum de Contrexéville, Contrexéville
- Arboretum du col du Haut-Jacques, Bruyères
- Arboretum du Col du Las, La Grande-Fosse
- Arboretum de Fontenoy-le-Château, Fontenoy-le-Château
- Arboretum de la Forêt d'Épinal, Épinal
- Arboretum de Fresse-sur-Moselle, Fresse-sur-Moselle
- Arboretum de la Hutte, Darney
- Arboretum de Mazeley, Mazeley
- Arboretum de Xertigny, Xertigny
- Jardins de Callunes, Ban-de-Sapt
- Jardin botanique de Gondremer, Rambervillers
- Jardin d'altitude du Haut Chitelet, Xonrupt-Longemer

== Yonne ==
- Serres municipales de Sens, Sens

== Yvelines ==
- Arboretum de Grignon, Thiverval-Grignon
- Jardin botanique de l'Institut National, Thiverval-Grignon
- Arboretum de Chèvreloup, Rocquencourt

== See also ==
- List of Remarkable Gardens of France

== References and external links ==
- Guide des jardins botaniques de France et des pays francophones, Le Carrousel, 2000. ISBN 978-2-7011-2784-2.
- Jardins Botaniques de France et des Pays Francophones
- Parcs et Jardins de France
- Arboretum liste
- Association des Parcs Botaniques de France (APBF)
- Convention on Biological Diversity: Botanical gardens in France
