= Arboretum Saint-Jean-de-la-Motte =

Arboretum in Pays de la Loire, France

The Arboretum Saint-Jean-de-la-Motte is the arboretum located along a botanical path in Saint-Jean-de-la-Motte, Sarthe, Pays de la Loire, France. It contains over 200 trees and is open daily without charge.

== See also ==
- List of botanical gardens in France
