= Jardin botanique de Tours =

Botanical garden and arboretum in Tours, France

Coordinates: 47°23′16″N 0°40′0″E

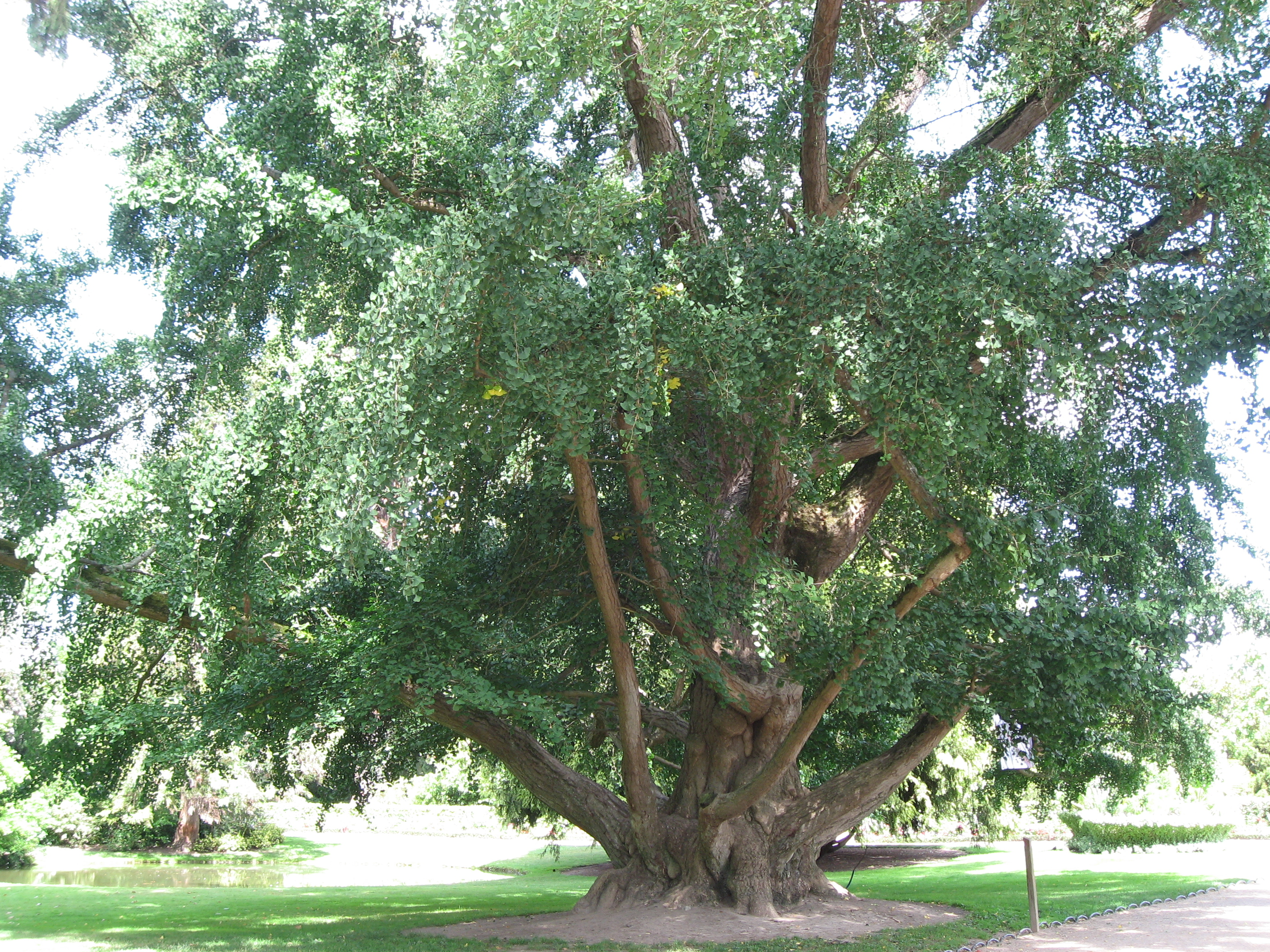
Ginkgo biloba in the Jardin botanique de Tours

The Jardin botanique de Tours (5 hectares) is a municipal botanical garden and arboretum located at 33, Boulevard Tonnellé, Tours, Indre-et-Loire, Centre-Val de Loire, France. It is open daily; admission is free.

The garden was established by public subscription in 1843 at the initiative of pharmacist Jean-Anthyme Margueron (1771–1848), and is the oldest public garden in the city. In response to the 1841 creation of the city's Hospice Général et de l’Ecole Préparatoire de Pharmacie, it began as a collection of about 2,000 medical and exotic plants arranged in greenhouses (containing about 500 plants), orchard, and garden proper. It was flooded by the Loire in 1848 and again in 1856, to a depth of 2 metres, which required rebuilding the garden and replacing most of its trees. In 1863 an orangery and animal park were added, and then in 1890 new greenhouses (cold, temperate, and hot) under the direction of Louis Madelin, with the garden's first seed catalog published in 1901. The greenhouses were damaged by bombardments in World War II.

The garden currently contains about 2,000 taxa, organized as follows:

- North - regular parterres along an avenue of magnolias, with a pool containing water lilies and lotus; renovated in 1980 to contain theme gardens and a phylogenetic garden.
- East - bulbs, rhizomes, and perennials, as well as a garden of plant evolution.
- South - an excellent arboretum in the English style, a pond, and a "garden of simples" as in medieval gardens.
- West - heath, bog, Mediterranean garden, and alpine garden.

The garden also contains an orangery, exhibition greenhouses, and a small space for animals.

== See also ==
- List of botanical gardens in France
