= Arboretum de l'Ile de la Ronde =

Arboretum in Auvergne, France

Coordinates: 46.30543°N 3.29334°E

The Arboretum de l'Ile de la Ronde (6 hectares) is an arboretum located in Saint-Pourçain-sur-Sioule, Allier, Auvergne, France. It is open daily; admission is free.

The arboretum is set within a park on the Ile de la Rond, bordering the Sioule river, and contains walking paths among a variety of flowers and trees.

== See also ==
- List of botanical gardens in France
