= Arboretum du Puy du Fou =

Arboretum in Pays de la Loire, France

Coordinates: 46.89°N 0.932°W

The Arboretum du Puy du Fou is an arboretum within the Grand Parc du Puy du Fou, a theme park located on La Papinière, Les Epesses, Vendée, Pays de la Loire, France. It is open daily in the summer; an admission fee is charged.

== See also ==
- Puy du Fou
- List of botanical gardens in France
