= Camifolia =

Botanical garden and tourist site in France

Coordinates: 47.2141°N 0.7336°W

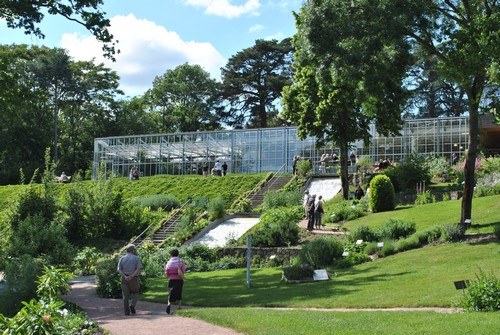
Le Jardin Camifolia, Paris, France

Camifolia (3.5 hectares), also known as various combinations of the Jardin botanique des Plantes Médicinales et Aromatiques and the Jardin botanique de Chemillé, is a botanical garden and tourist site. The park is located at 1 rue de l'Arzillé, Chemillé, Maine-et-Loire, Pays de la Loire, France. It is open daily except Monday in the warmer months; an admission fee is charged.

The garden was established in 1976 by several locals growers to reflect the region's traditional cultivation of medicinal plants, particularly chamomile. Camifolia was originally a public garden and was not made to charge for visits or to welcome tourists. In 1996 the non-profit society "Les Amis du Jardin" transformed the garden in a touristic and educational space with the Chemillé Tourist Office's help. The garden was inaugurated in 2008. Today the garden contains more than 600 types of medicinal and useful plants, with a national collection of chamomile, and has been recognized as a member of the Jardins botaniques de France et des pays francophones. In 2010, it received the label "Qualité tourisme" and "Jardin remarquable" in 2018. In 2013, the park had 17,000 visitors per seasons and 28,000 in 2018. The garden also contains greenhouses (200 m^{2}), an exhibition hall, a video room, and a store. Camifolia is adapted to welcome schoolchildren and it offers many visits and events like medicinal plant days, open-air cinema and wellness evenings. The garden has an ecological management. It is chemical-free and wants to keep a biological diversity. There are 48 birds species in the garden. Camifolia tries to help the fauna by installing various insect shelters.

== The different gardens ==
There are six different gardens with specific themes:

- The garden of flavour and scents: all the species have strong smells or special textures and colours
- The garden of local produce: a chamomile field, the typical product of Camifolia
- The medicinal and toxic plant garden: only toxic plants, who can be useful in medicine if they are used correctly
- The garden of flavours: all plants in this garden can be used to cook. It can be vegetables or herbs to season your meals
- The fibre and dye garden: plants in this garden can be used to make naturals dyes, ropes, or clothes
- The botanical garden: the biggest garden, with over 300 plants laid in a specific order (APG III)

== See also ==
- List of botanical gardens in France
