= Jardin des plantes de Caen =

Botanical garden and arboretum in Normandy, France

Coordinates: 49°11′21″N 0°22′18″W

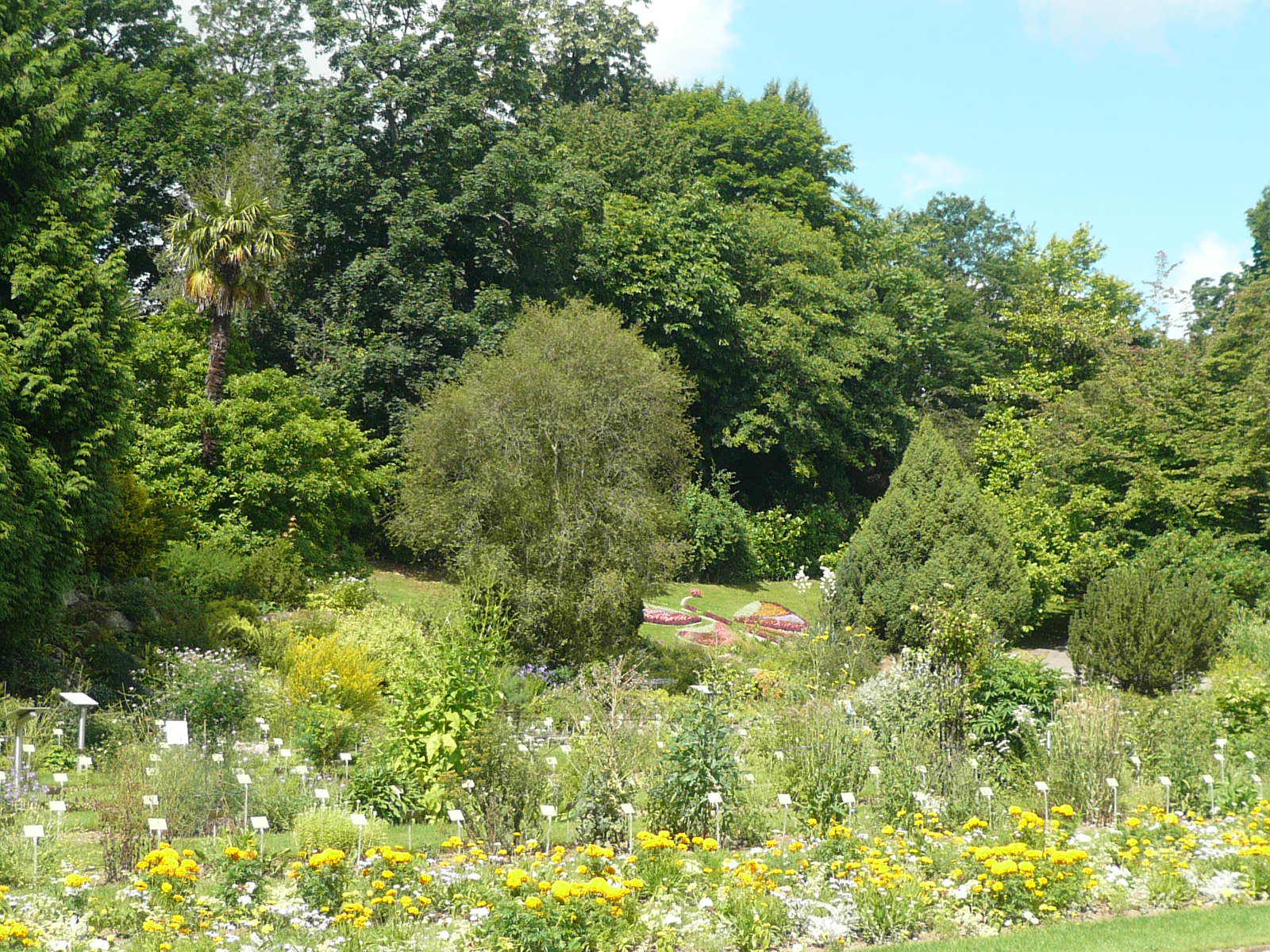
Jardin botanique de Caen

The jardin des plantes de Caen (French for: 'Garden of the Plants of Caen'), also known as jardin botanique de Caen ('Botanical Garden of Caen') is a botanical garden and arboretum located at 5, place Blot, Caen, Calvados, Normandy, France. Covering 5,000 m^{2}, it is open daily.

The garden's earliest plants were collected in 1689, and its first catalog published in 1781 (Jardin botanique de Caen by Farin and Demoneuse). It was established on the site of an old stone quarry as a university botanical garden, but in 1803, after the French Revolution, it was extended by 3.5 hectares to become a municipal park. In 1860 two large greenhouses were constructed, and a botanical institute added in 1891, but all were destroyed in World War II. New greenhouses were built in 1988.

Today the garden contains more than 8,000 species laid out in two sections. The lower section contains native plants of Normandy (about 1,000 species), a medicinal garden (600 plants), horticultural collections (700 varieties), rockeries (1,500 dwarf specimens), an arboretum of trees and shrubs (500 species), and a greenhouse of about 1,500 exotic species. The upper section is a public park containing remarkable tree specimens including Sophora japonica (1750), Sequoiadendron giganteum (1890), and Cryptomeria japonica (1870).

The garden also has a pedagogical role, where gardeners can ask advice to professionals, who are available to answer questions and regularly organize workshops, and is committed on environmental issues. During Spring, they offer ladybug and lacewing eggs to local gardeners, in order to encourage biological gardening and avoiding the use of pesticides.

== See also ==
- List of botanical gardens in France
