= Jardin botanique du Château de Vauville =

Private botanical garden in Vauville, Manche, Normandy, France

Coordinates: 49°38′6″N 1°50′43″W

The Jardin botanique du Château de Vauville (4 hectares), also known as the Jardin botanique de Vauville, is a private botanical garden located on the grounds of the Château de Vauville near Beaumont-Hague in Vauville, Manche, Normandy, France. It is open afternoons in the warmer months; an admission fee is charged.

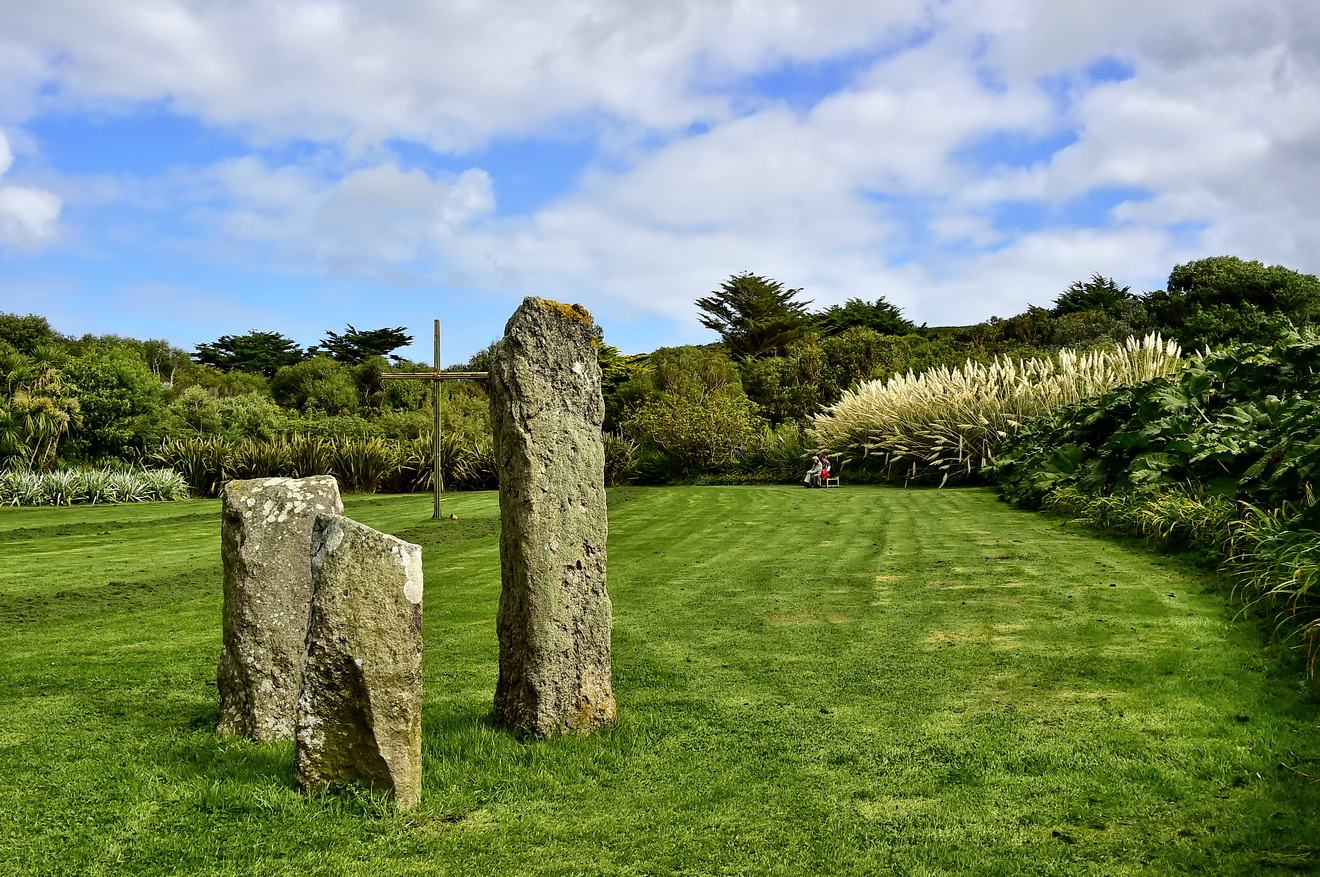
Jardin botanique de Vauville

The garden was begun by Eric Pellerin in 1948 on a windy site located within 300 meters of the Atlantic Ocean. Today it contains more than 900 semi-tropical species of plants from the Southern Hemisphere set within windbreaks of diverse eucalyptus and bamboo. Collections include aloes, Dimorphotheca, Echium pininana, and palm trees.

== See also ==
- List of botanical gardens in France
