= Espace botanique du Frasnois =

Botanical garden in La Fromagerie, France

Coordinates: 46.6190°N 5.8814°E

The Espace botanique du Frasnois is a botanical garden located in the village of La Fromagerie near Le Frasnois, Jura, Franche-Comté, France. It is open daily in the warmer months; admission is free.

The garden was created in 1997 by Christian Monneret and consists of three distinct parts: the botanical garden proper, a botanical trail, and an indoor exhibit of the region's plants. The garden focuses on herbs and medical plants; it contains about 150 plants with explanations of their therapeutic qualities. The nature trail is about 800 metres in length and displays about 250 species, each labeled with Latin and French names.

== See also ==
- List of botanical gardens in France
