= Arboretum du Chêne-Vert =

Arboretum in Nouvelle-Aquitaine, France

Coordinates: 45.8811°N 0.7206°E

The Arboretum du Chêne-Vert (3 hectares) is a private arboretum located just off the Route de Limoges in Chabanais, Charente, Nouvelle-Aquitaine, France. It is open daily by appointment; an admission fee is charged.

The arboretum was established in 1977 beside the Vienne River, with most landscaping and development taking place since 1985. It currently contains more than 2500 species of trees, shrubs and perennials, including birches (40 varieties), pines (60), magnolias (40), maples (102), oaks (60), as well as hybrid roses (75 varieties), lonicera (60), and cornus (40). Plantings also include good collections of Hamamelidaceae, Styracaceae, and Stewartia, as well as herbs, ferns, bulbs, and flowers.

== See also ==
- List of botanical gardens in France
