= Jardin botanique du Thabor =

French botanical garden

Coordinates: 48.1144°N 1.6669°W

The Jardin botanique du Thabor (Breton: Liorzh louzawouriezh Tabor), also known as the Jardin botanique de la Ville de Rennes (Liorzh louzawouriezh Kêr Roazhon), is a compact but significant botanical garden located at the eastern side of the Parc du Thabor in, Rennes, Brittany, France. It is open daily without charge.

The garden was established in 1868 and consists of circular walkways around 11 beds growing over 3,000 species. The larger park contains 129 species of trees, including 34 conifer species, as well as 373 shrub species. Its holdings also include about 1500 herbarium specimens. Between 2008 and 2018, the park was renovated. This was complicated by the presence of buxus parasites.

Images of the Jardin botanique du Thabor
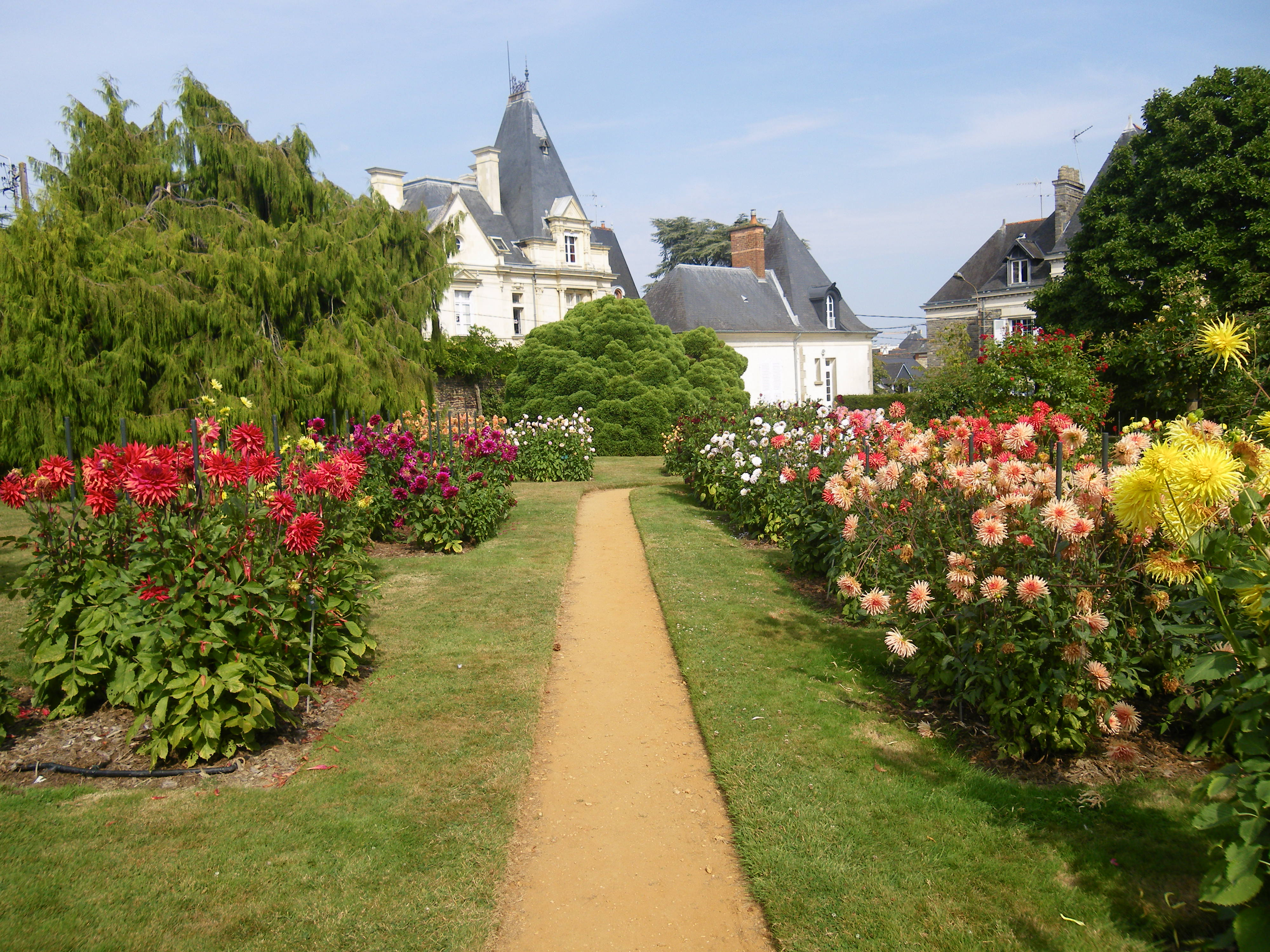
View of the garden buildings in September

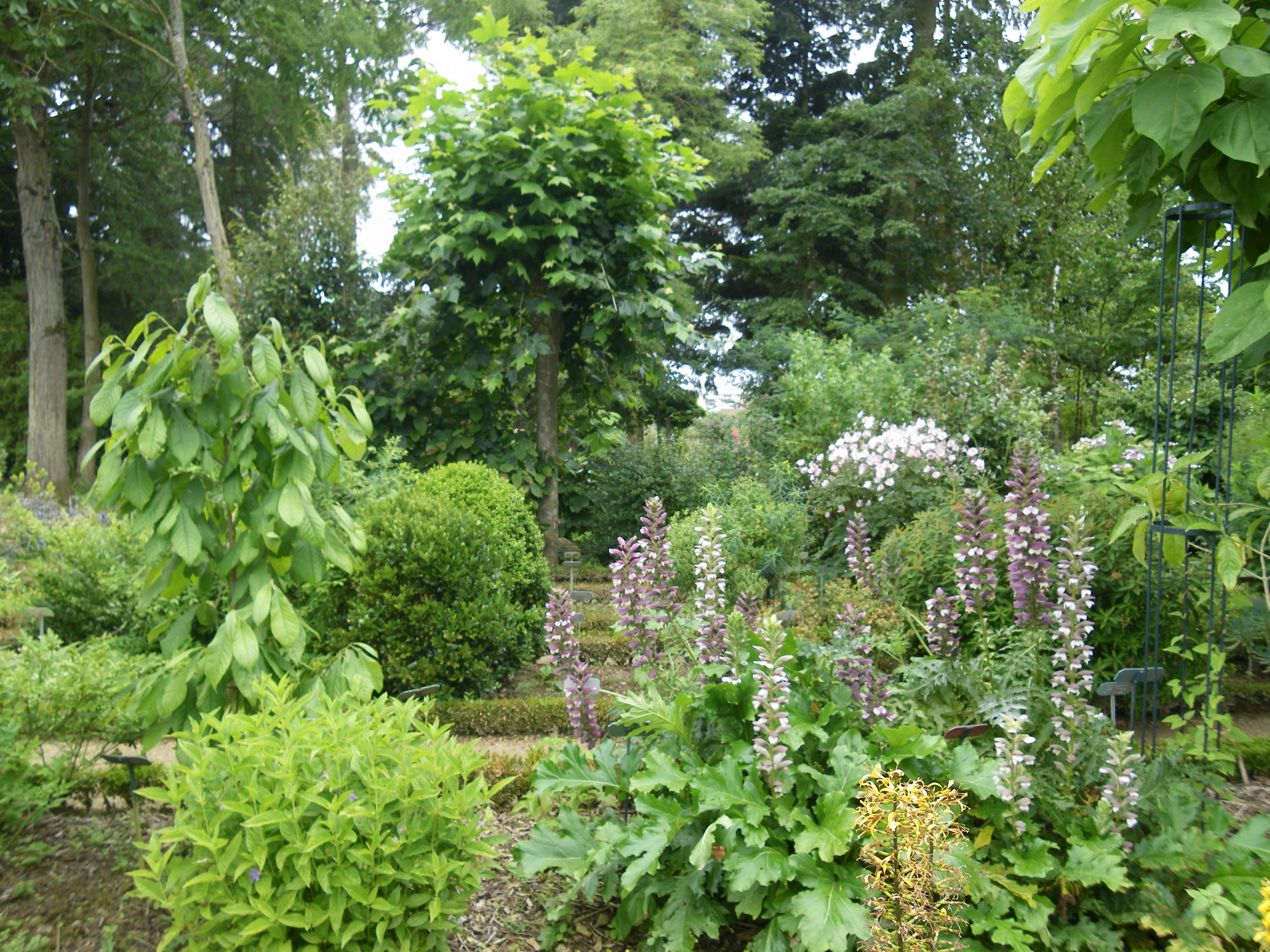
A verdant section of the gardens

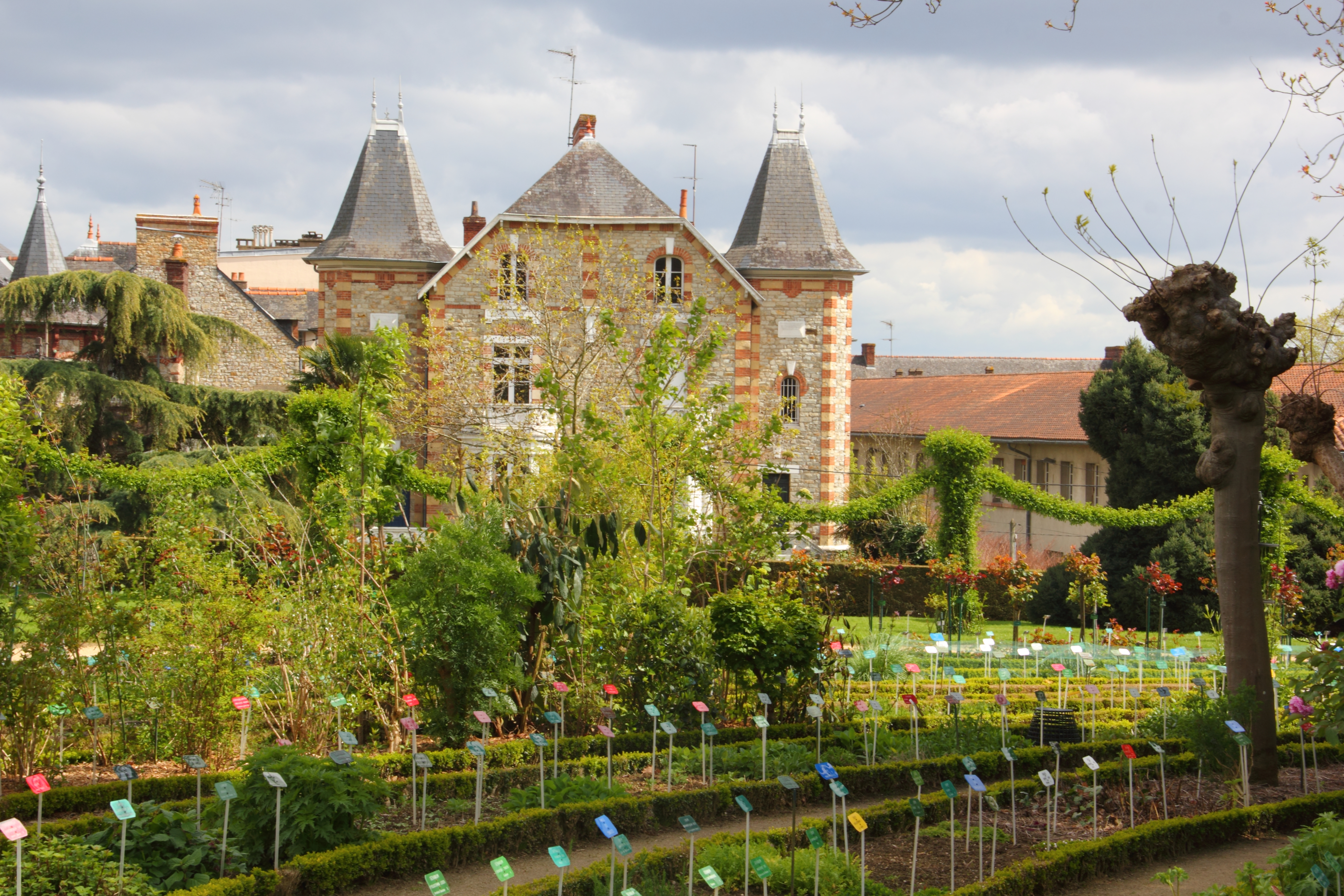
Flower beds and buildings at Jardin botanique du Thabor

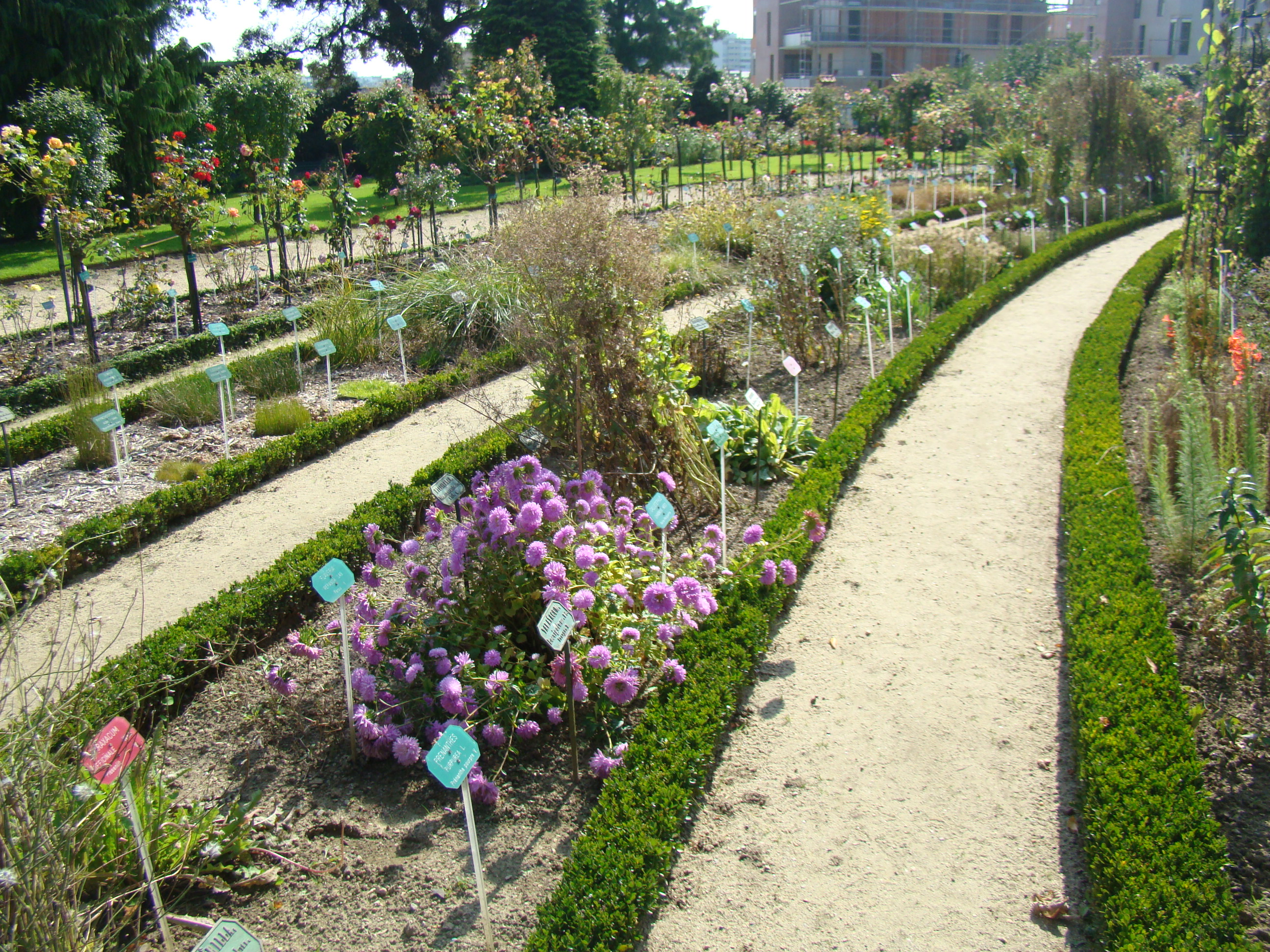
Detail of flowerbeds at Jardin botanique du Thabor

== See also ==
- List of botanical gardens in France
