= Arboretum de la Sivrite =

Research arboretum in Lorraine, France

Coordinates: 48.67°N 6.07°E

The Arboretum de la Sivrite is a research arboretum located within the Forêt de Haye near Vandœuvre-lès-Nancy, Meurthe-et-Moselle, Lorraine, France.

== See also ==
- List of botanical gardens in France
