= Jardin botanique de la Charme =

Botanical garden in France

Coordinates: 45.7999°N 3.1238°E

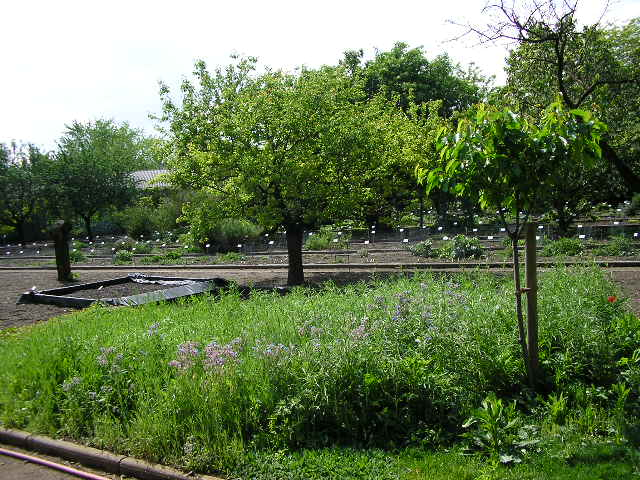
Jardin botanique de la Charme

The Jardin botanique de la Charme (18,000 m²), formerly known as the Jardin botanique de la Ville de Clermont-Ferrand, is a municipal botanical garden located at 10, rue de la Charme, Clermont-Ferrand, Puy-de-Dôme, Auvergne, France. It is open weekdays year-round plus weekends in the warmer months; admission is free.

The city's first botanical garden was established in 1781 by Abbé Antoine Delarbre on a rented site, now the Jardin Lecoq, and moved multiple times throughout the centuries.

Today's garden was created in 1974 and currently contains about 2600 plant species arranged in a variety of collections including a systematic collection arranged by botanical family (1600 species), a collection of trees and ornamental shrubs, perennials, shade garden with ferns, pond and bog plants, medicinal and useful plants (500 plants), a collection of fruit species, test garden for conifers, and a greenhouse. It also contains a seed collection of 2000 samples.

== See also ==
- List of botanical gardens in France
