= Jardin botanique de l'Evêché =

Botanical garden in Limoges, Haute-Vienne, Limousin, France

Coordinates: 45.8285°N 1.2670°E

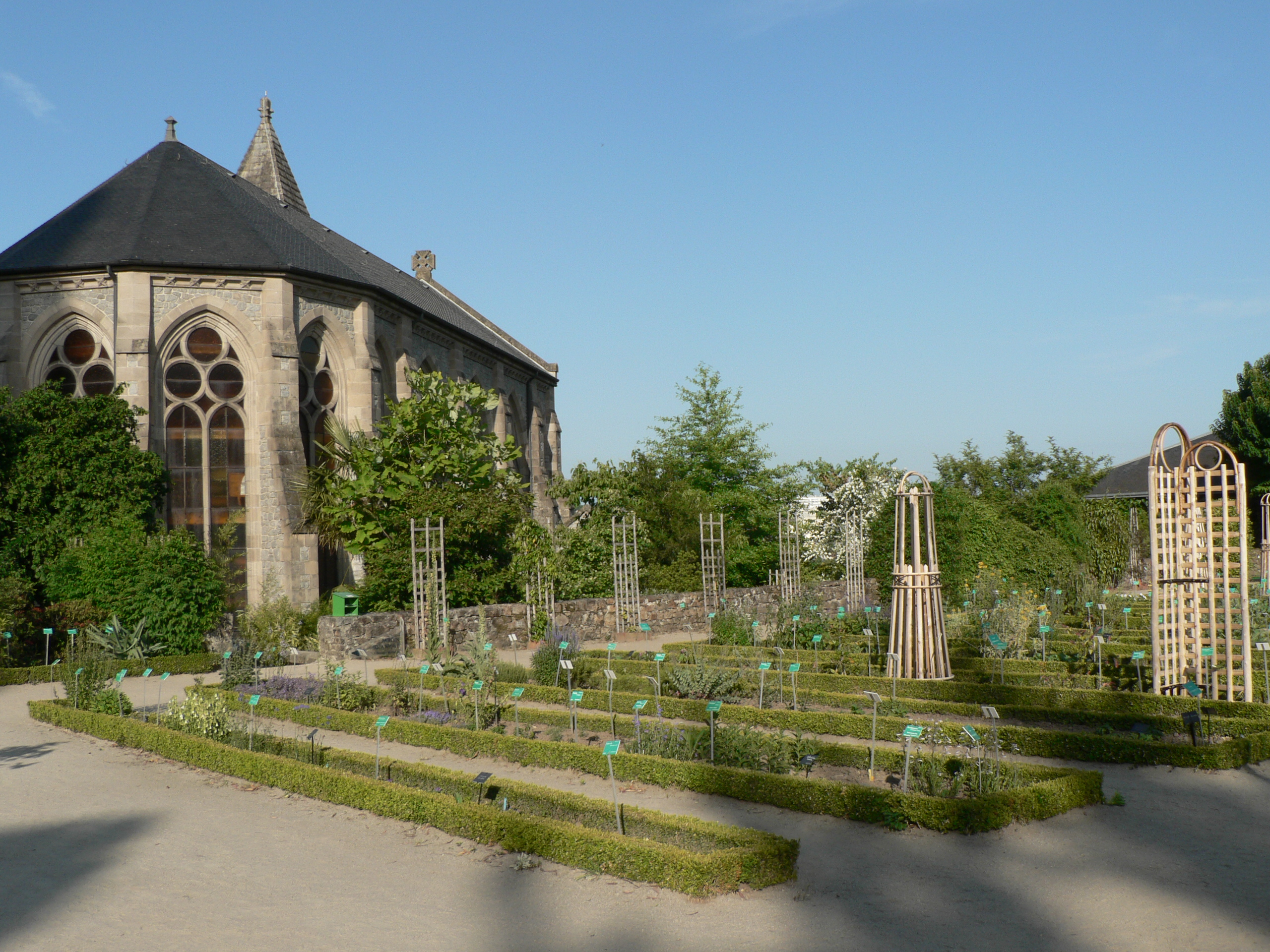
Jardin botanique de l'Evêché

The Jardin botanique de l'Evêché (Botanical Garden of the Bishopric, 2 hectares), also known as the Jardin botanique de Limoges, is a botanical garden located behind the Cathedral and Musée de l'Evêché in Limoges, Haute-Vienne, Limousin, France. It is open daily without charge.

The garden was first established in the 18th century, with today's botanical garden created 1956–1961 and renovated in 1976. It occupies several terraces overlooking the Vienne River with gardens organized into French parterres. Today the systematic garden contains more than 1,200 plants, organized into groupings including medicinal plants; industrial and dye plants; food and condiments; fodder; and aromatic plants.

== See also ==
- List of botanical gardens in France
