= Jardin botanique Floralpina =

Botanical garden in Nord-Pas de Calais, France

Coordinates: 50.2852°N 2.7580°E

The Jardin botanique Floralpina is a private botanical garden specializing in alpine plants. It is located at 59, Avenue du Mémorial des Fusillés, Arras, Pas de Calais, Nord-Pas de Calais, France. It is open on the last Sunday in May and by appointment.

The garden was established in 1953 by Jean-Michel Spas. Today it is one of the most extensive collections of alpine plants in France, containing about 4,100 alpine taxa (2,500 genera) representing 3,700 species and 400 cultivars, with 450 taxa of Saxifraga and many threatened species. It also contains fine tree specimens including Cedrus libani, Ginkgo biloba, Metasequoia glyptostroboides, Pinus cembra, Sequoiadendron, and Taxodium distichum.

== See also ==
- List of botanical gardens in France
