= Jardin botanique de la Perrine =

Botanical garden in Pays de la Loire, France

Coordinates: 48.0661°N 0.7695°W

The Jardin botanique de la Perrine is a botanical garden located along the river Mayenne on the Allée Adrien-Bruneau, Laval, Mayenne, Pays de la Loire, France. It is open daily without charge.

The garden was created in 1920 by Jules Denier on land purchased in 1885 by the city from its previous owner, who lost it to gambling debts. It consists of a French garden and a second English-style rose garden containing about a hundred rose varieties. Plants of interest include 20 types of camellia, Cedrus atlantica and Cedrus libani, Ginkgo biloba, Quercus ilex, Sequoiadendron, and an allée of Tilia platyphyllos some 120–130 years old.

The garden also contains a memorial to native son Le Douanier Henri Rousseau (1844-1910), the painter, engraved with the autograph poem written by Guillaume Apollinaire in chalk on its stone, as well as a duck pond, an aviary of exotic birds and another of pigeons, and an orangerie now reworked as exhibition hall.

== See also ==
- List of botanical gardens in France
