= Jardin botanique de Sedan =

Botanical Garden in Sudan

Coordinates: 49.6972°N 4.9464°E

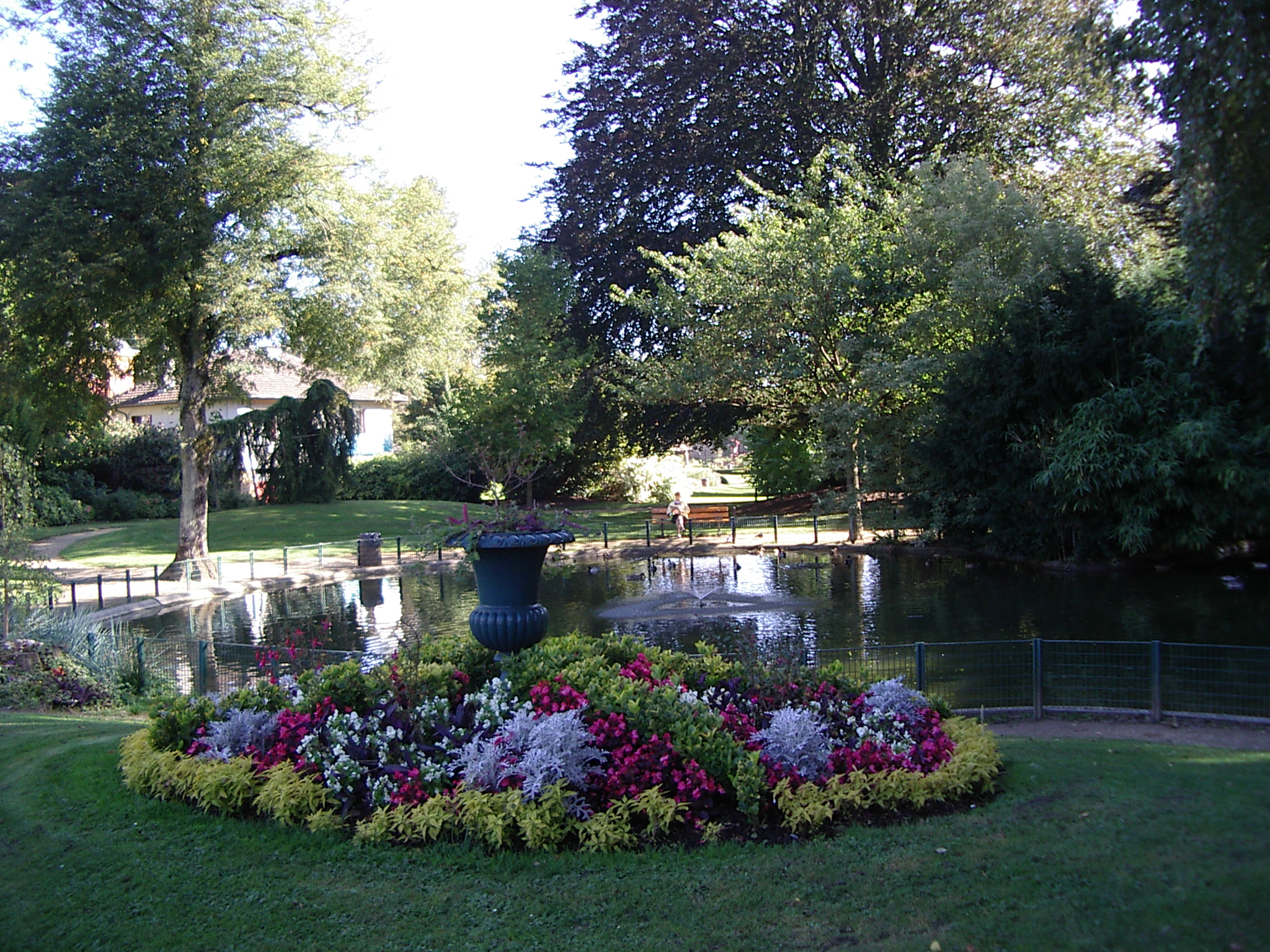
Photography of Jardin botanique de Sedan

The Jardin botanique de Sedan is a botanical garden and city park located on Philippoteaux Avenue beside the Place d'Alsace-Lorraine, Sedan, Ardennes, Champagne-Ardenne, France. It is open daily without charge.

The garden was established in 1875 upon the demolition of the Bourbon bastion, with its plan drawn up by René Richer. A statue of Paul et Virginie beneath an umbrella, battered in the cyclone of 1905, still graces the garden. Today it contains mature trees (beech, maple, chestnut), magnolias, a rose garden with more than 50 varieties, a collection of hydrangeas, a bandstand, and a pool with fish, swans, and ducks.

== See also ==
- List of botanical gardens in France
