= Jardin botanique de Talence =

Botanical garden in Aquitaine, France

Coordinates: 44.8099°N 0.5905°W

The Jardin botanique de Talence (2.5 hectares) is a small botanical garden within the Parc du Château Peixotto at 3 avenue Espeleta, Talence, Gironde, Aquitaine, France. The park is open daily without charge, but the botanical garden itself is open only to students and professionals.

Today's garden belongs to the Université de Bordeaux. It contains about 2000 species of pharmaceutical and medical interest, including numerous taxa Cucurbitaceae, Cyperaceae, Malvaceae, as well as two greenhouses, an orangerie, and a classroom building.

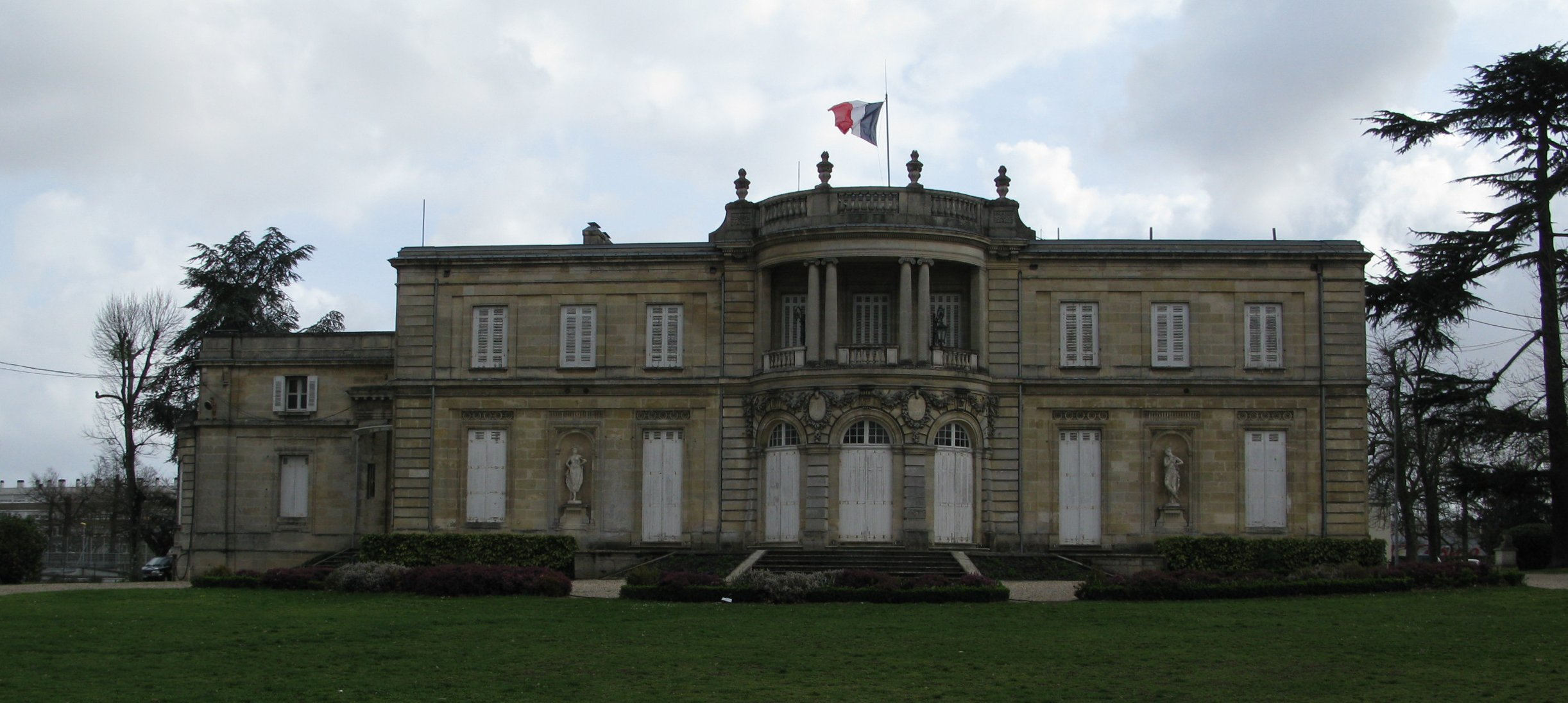
Jardin botanique de Talence

== See also ==
- List of botanical gardens in France
