= Arboretum de la Fosse =

Arboretum in Centre-Val de Loire, France

Coordinates: 47°46′35″N 0°50′47″E

The Arboretum de la Fosse (25 hectares), sometimes known as the Parc botanique de la Fosse, is a historic, private arboretum located in Fontaine-les-Coteaux, Loir-et-Cher, Centre-Val de Loire, France. It is open several days per week in the summer; an admission fee is charged.

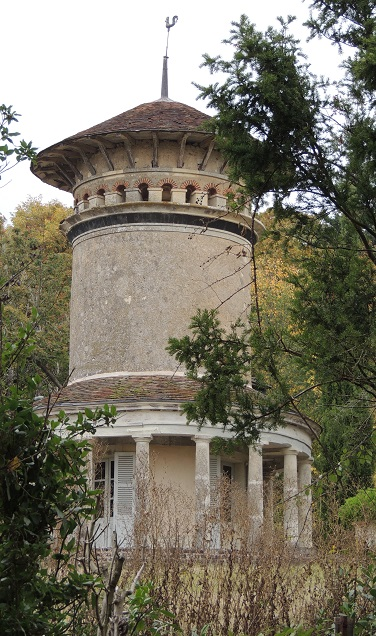
Pigeon habitat column at the Domaine

The arboretum was established in 1751 by Alexandre-Sébastien Gérard, an advisor to Empress Josephine on the Château de Malmaison, and is one of France's oldest arboreta. It has subsequently been owned and maintained by 7 generations of the same family, and in 1978 was the first arboretum entitled to protection by the Monuments Historiques designation. It contains a number of buildings dating to the 18th century onwards, including an interesting dovecote built in 1817.

The arboretum is notable for its mature specimens of Cedrus libani (1810), Taxus baccata cv. Lebanon (1810), Pinus laricio (1820), Pinus strobus (1820), Taxus baccata cv. fastigiata (1825), Cephalotaxus fortunei (1880), Juniperus drupacea (1880), Davidia involucrata (1905), Cedrus brevifolia (1908), as well as good plantings of magnolias, cornus, rhododendrons, and Actinidia sinensis, Carya ovata, Ceanothus, Cedrus brevifolia, Cyclobalanopsis myrsinifolia, Fraxinus biltmoreana, Fraxinus paxiana, Lagerstroemia indica, Magnolia ashei, Magnolia fraseri, Nyssa sylvatica, Parrotia persica, Quercus acuta, Quercus dentata, Quercus glandulifera, Quercus myrsinifolia, Quercus paxiana, and Quercus stellata.

== See also ==
- List of botanical gardens in France
