= Arboretum du Ru de Rôge =

Arboretum in Franche-Comté, France

The Arboretum du Ru de Rôge is an arboretum located in Blanzey, southeast of Fougerolles, Haute-Saône, Franche-Comté, France. The arboretum was established in 1996 with plantings conducted 1997–1998. It now contains nearly 60 species of trees with walking paths, and is open daily without charge.

== See also ==
- List of botanical gardens in France
