= Jardin botanique d'Auvergne =

Botanical garden in Auvergne, France

Coordinates: 45°46′50″N 3°05′15″E

The Jardin botanique d'Auvergne (9 hectares), also known as the Jardin botanique d'essais de Royat-Charade, is a botanical garden located in Charade, Royat, Puy-de-Dôme, Auvergne, France.

The garden was established in 2007 as a joint undertaking between the Jardin en Herbes association and the town of Royat. It has been planted with more than 150 types of local flora, and in 2008 began a collaboration with the Conservatoire botanique national du Massif central.

As present the garden's main areas include: a reception area, jardin d'altitude (plants of the Massif Central or sub-Alpine areas), reconstruction of an open and a closed environment, meadows and hedgerows, stream valley areas, space reserved for scientific study of plant species, ethnobotanical garden, magical garden based on popular beliefs, shrubs, and forest garden.

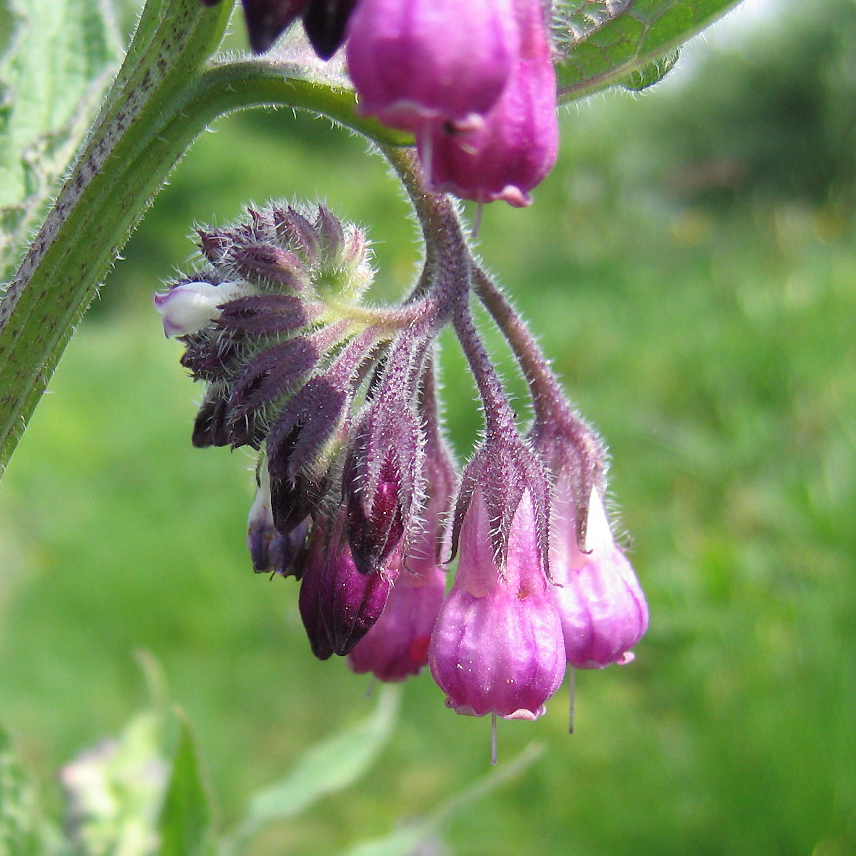
Jardin botanique d'Auvergne

== See also ==
- List of botanical gardens in France
