= Jardin botanique de Tourcoing =

Municipal botanical garden and arboretum in Nord-Pas-de-Calais, France

Coordinates: 50.7245°N 3.1676°E

The Jardin botanique de Tourcoing (11,900 m^{2}) is a municipal botanical garden and arboretum located at 32 rue du Moulin Fagot, Tourcoing, Nord, Nord-Pas-de-Calais, France. It is open daily; admission is free.

The garden was established in 1917 on the site of a former private garden, and has recently been renovated and extended. Today it is arranged into five major sections:

- Cherry tree allée
- Greenhouses for collections and education
- French garden, divided into four quadrants
- English garden
- New garden with a North American theme

The garden contains fine specimens of Fagus sylvatica, Pinus nigra, and Tilia platyphyllos, as well as trees including Acer pseudoplatanus, Aesculus hippocastanum, Fraxinus excelsior, Platanus × hispanica, Populus nigra, Prunus serrulata, Robinia pseudoacacia, Taxus baccata, and Tilia platyphyllos, with lesser trees including Acer platanoides, Ailanthus altissima, Crataegus, Fagus sylvatica, Ginkgo biloba, Gleditsia triacanthos, Ilex aquifolium, Pinus griffithii, Pinus mugo, Pinus nigra, Pyrus communis, Salix alba, Sophora japonica, Taxus baccata, and Tilia americana.

== See also ==
- List of botanical gardens in France
