= Parc botanique de la Tour Vieille =

Garden in Alès, France

Coordinates: 44.1117°N 4.0790°E

The Parc botanique de la Tour Vieille is a municipal park with botanical collections, located at the old tower in Alès, Gard, Languedoc-Roussillon, France. It is open daily without charge.

The park was created by an amateur landscaper, but abandoned for some years before its acquisition by the city in 1973. The city then rehabilitated its grounds, as well as its greenhouse and eponymous old tower, and in 1981 opened it to the public. In 1990 its first botanical inventory identified 200 species and varieties of plants; there are now over 700. The park also contains a miniature golf facility.

== See also ==
- List of botanical gardens in France
