= Arboretum de la Forêt d'Épinal =

Arboretum in Grand Est, France

Coordinates: 48.18°N 6.45°E

The Arboretum de la Forêt d'Epinal (1.1 hectares) is an arboretum located in Saut-le-Cerf, in the 3600-hectare communal forest of Épinal, Vosges, Grand Est, France.

== See also ==
- List of botanical gardens in France
