= Arboretum de Tournay =

Arboretum in Midi-Pyrénées, France

Coordinates: 43.18°N 0.246°E

The Arboretum de Tournay (9 hectares) is an arboretum located in Tournay, Hautes-Pyrénées, Midi-Pyrénées, France. It is managed by the Office National des Forêts and open daily without charge.

The arboretum was established in 1992, following a proposal by M. Patrick Pierquet, on woodlands that had been reforested in 1958 after a fire. The arboretum contained 70 species at inception, which collection has now grown to 170 species including Acer griseum, Cornus florida rubra, Fagus sylvatica, Ginkgo biloba, Magnolia macrophylla, Pyrus salicifolia, Torreya nucifera, and Ulmus parvifolia

== See also ==
- List of botanical gardens in France
