= Arboretum de Guignicourt-sur-Vence =

Arboretum in Grand Est, France

Coordinates: 49.68205°N 4.64573°E

The Arboretum de Guignicourt-sur-Vence, also known as the Arboretum Victor Cayasse, is an arboretum located in Guignicourt-sur-Vence, Ardennes, Grand Est, France. It is open daily without charge.

The arboretum was established at the start of the 20th century, and subsequently restored by the Natural History Society of the Ardennes. It contains some 80 species of trees and shrubs, as well as about a hundred species of herbaceous plants of the Crêtes Préardennaises.

== See also ==
- List of botanical gardens in France
