= Arboretum du Val d'Ainan =

Private arboretum in Rhône-Alpes, France

Coordinates: 45.19°N 5.778°E

The Arboretum du Val d'Ainan (10 hectares) is a private arboretum located in Saint-Geoire-en-Valdaine, Isère, Rhône-Alpes, France. It is open primarily by appointment; a fee is charged.

The arboretum was established in 1993 and now contains nearly 350 species of trees and shrubs, organized into areas as follows: mountain, Mediterranean, Caucasus, Himalaya, China, Korea and Japan, and North America. The collection concentrates on autumn foliage, remarkable tree bark, oaks, and Pinaceae.

== See also ==
- List of botanical gardens in France
