= Arboretum de Saint-Avaugourd-des-Landes =

Botanical garden in France

The Arboretum de Saint-Avaugourd-des-Landes is an arboretum located in Saint-Avaugourd-des-Landes, Vendée, Pays de la Loire, France.

== See also ==
- List of botanical gardens in France
