= Conservatoire national du Pélargonium =

Municipal botanical garden in Centre-Val de Loire, France

Coordinates: 47.0719°N 2.3610°E

The Conservatoire national du Pélargonium is a municipal botanical garden specializing in pelargoniums, which is located within the municipal greenhouses (serres municipales) on the Chemin Tortiot, Bourges, Cher, Centre-Val de Loire, France. The collection was established in 1982 by Daniel Lejeune and now contains 250 pelargonium species and 1,100 cultivars. It describes itself as the largest such collection in France, and has been designated a member of the French Conservatoire des collections végétales spécialisées (CCVS).

== See also ==
- List of botanical gardens in France
