= Serres municipales de Sens =

Municipal greenhouses in Bourgogne, France

Coordinates: 48.1858°N 3.2790°E

The Serres municipales de Sens (600 m^{2}) are municipal greenhouses located in the Parc du Moulin à Tan at 28, Chemin de Babie, Sens, Yonne, Bourgogne, France. They are open every afternoon without charge.

The greenhouses were constructed circa 1970 and restored in 2000. They contain about 1,500 plant taxa organized into three distinct rooms:

- Cactus House - cactus and succulents.
- Winter Garden - a tropical forest including avocado tree, sugar cane, orange and pear trees, pineapples, cocoa trees and coffee plants, banana, date palms, vanilla vines and pomegranates, as well as aquatic plants including Euryale ferox, Victoria cruziana and Victoria regia.
- Epiphyte House - orchids, carnivorous plants, bromeliads and other epiphytes.

== See also ==
- List of botanical gardens in France
