= Arboretum de Ripaille =

Arboretum and forest in Rhône-Alpes, France

Coordinates: 46°23′30″N 6°30′03″E

The Arboretum de Ripaille (53 hectares) is an arboretum and forest located on the grounds of the Château de Ripaille, Thonon-les-Bains, Haute-Savoie, Rhône-Alpes, France. It is open daily except Monday, but closed in December.

The arboretum is set beside the Lake Geneva (Lac Léman), within the medieval hunting grounds of the Counts and Dukes of Savoy which are now surrounded by high walls and cut through with a web of wide allées. Its chateau was constructed in 1434 with partial restoration in 1892. From 1930 to 1934 Andrew Engel planted 58 species of trees, from around the world, across 19 hectares of these grounds. Heavy storms in 1999 severely damaged the arboretum, with restoration beginning in 2002. Since 1997 the Mémorial National des Justes de France, honoring citizens who risked their lives saving Jews during World War II, has been set within the center of the arboretum.

== See also ==
- List of botanical gardens in France
