= Nature et Paysages =

Botanical garden in Midi-Pyrénées, France

Coordinates: 43°44′23″N 0°33′45″E

Nature et Paysages, also known as the Jardin Carnivore, is a botanical garden specializing in carnivorous plants. It is located in Peyrusse-Massas, Gers, Midi-Pyrénées, France, and open daily except Tuesdays and Wednesdays in the warmer months; an admission fee is charged.

The garden was created in 1986 by Jean-Jacques Labat. In 1995 it was designated a national collection of carnivorous plants by the Conservatoire des Collections Végétales Spécialisées (CCVS), in 1999 was recognized by the Jardins botaniques de France et des pays francophones, and in 2003 opened to the public. Today the garden contains about 500 species of carnivorous plants, out of approximately 600 identified across the world, grown within a set of bogs and swamps. It describes itself as one of the largest such collections in the world.

== See also ==
- List of botanical gardens in France
