= Fossilea =

Museum with geological exhibit and botanical garden in Auvergne-Rhône-Alpes, France

Coordinates: 45.8795°N 4.6758°E

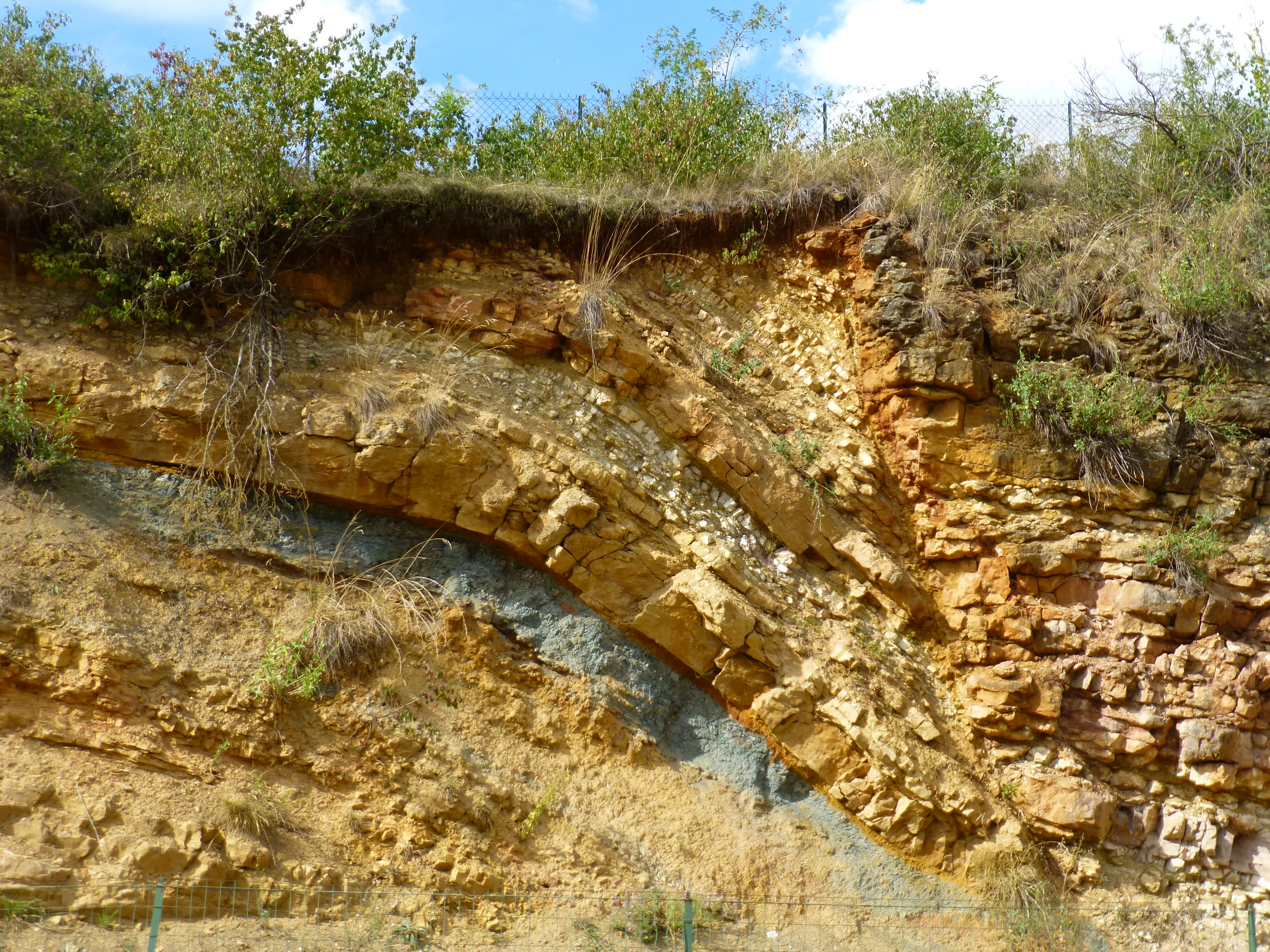
A geological fault display on the museum site

Fossilea (formerly known as "Espace Pierres Folles") is a museum with geological exhibit and botanical garden located at 116 chemin du Pinay, St Jean des Vignes, Rhône, Auvergne-Rhône-Alpes, France. It is open daily in the warmer months; an admission fee is charged.

The museum was established in 1987 on the 2-hectare former site of a cement works. Its ground floor presents the Earth's formation, emergence of life and its evolution over time, and fossils of the region; it also contains several aquariums. The second floor presents the relationship between soil and vegetation, including viticulture with the origin of the diversity of Beaujolais wine, as well as the regional use of stone for construction and cement manufacture. The top floor contains temporary exhibits.

The geological trail was established in 1988, and consists of four sites reflecting the region's geology, particularly of fossils and strata from 195 to 245 million years ago. The trail contains informative displays designed by students of the College des Quatre Vents.

The botanical garden was inaugurated in April 1995 and is a member of Jardins Botaniques de France et des Pays Francophones. It covers 8400 m^{2} and as of 2007 contained 529 plant species, including 567 taxa of herbaceous plants and 8 taxa of conifers, focusing on local flora, particularly those of the clay and limestone soil of southern Beaujolais, but also including Mediterranean plants and a few non-native trees such as Atlas cedar and walnut. The garden consists of three flowerbeds, landscaped plantings, a sandy area for heathers, and a rock garden. Each species is labeled with its botanical family, scientific name, and common name.

== See also ==
- List of botanical gardens in France
