= Jardin botanique et verger de La Bussière =

Botanical garden in France

Coordinates: 46°38′07″N 0°49′28″E

The Jardin botanique et verger de La Bussière is a botanical garden located in La Bussière, Vienne, Nouvelle-Aquitaine, France. The garden contains 300 types of medicinal and edible plants including roses and fruit trees. An admission fee is charged.

== See also ==
- Château de La Bussière in La Bussière, Loiret, which also contains a garden
- List of botanical gardens in France
