= Jardin botanique de Bayeux =

Botanical garden and municipal park in Calvados, Normandy, France

Coordinates: 49.2855°N 0.7176°W

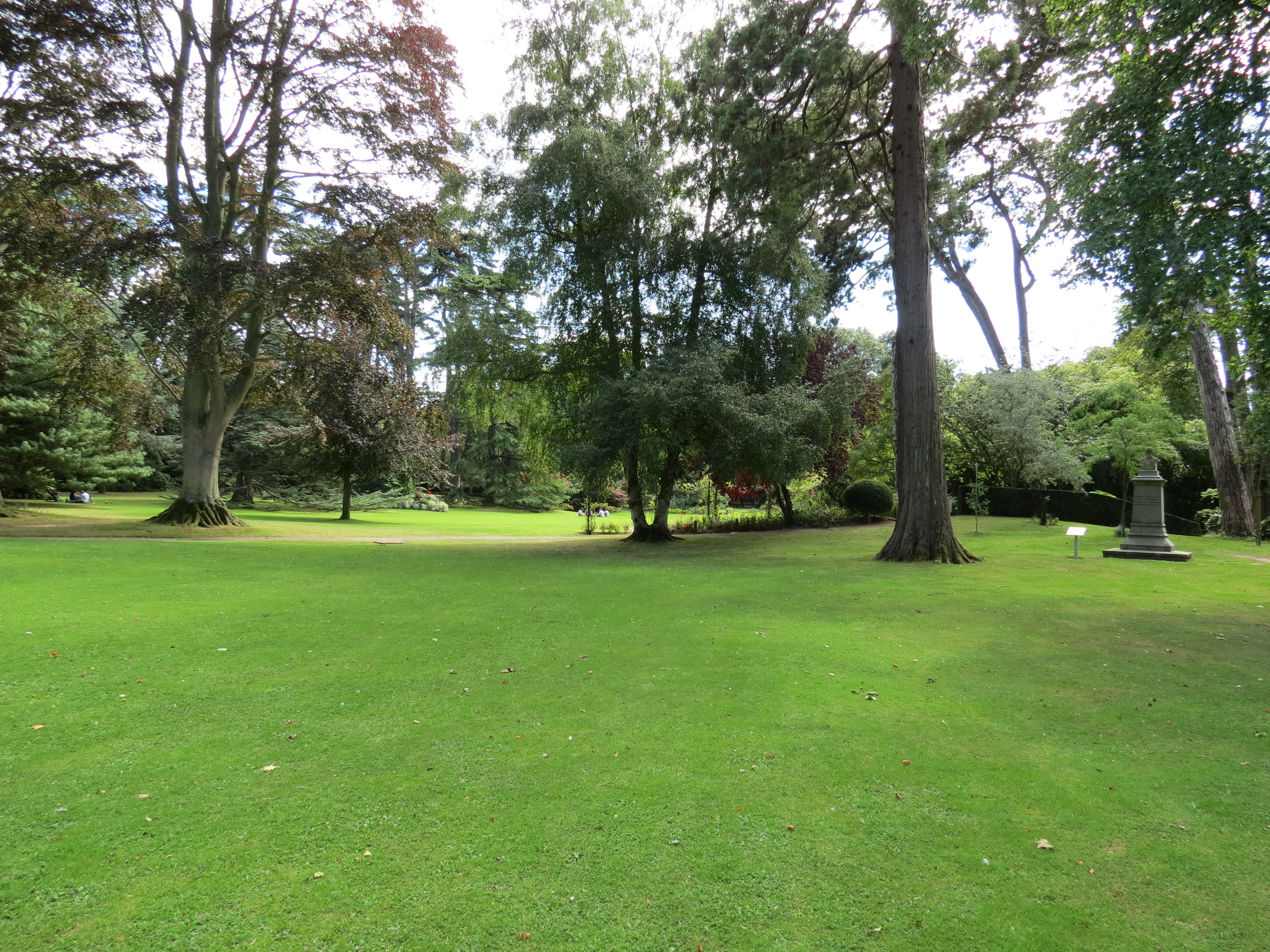

The Jardin botanique de Bayeux (2.6 hectares), also called the Jardin public de Bayeux, is a botanical garden and municipal park located at 53, route de Port-en-Bessin, Bayeux, Calvados, Normandy, France. It is open daily without charge.

The garden site was formerly a meadow, bequeathed in 1851 by Charlemagne Jean-Delamare (1772–1858) as a garden for teaching horticulture, landscaped by Eugène Bühler (1822–1907), and in 1864 opened to the public. Many specimens planted from 1859 to 1864 remain. The most notable among its roughly 400 mature trees is a weeping European Beech that in 1932 was named a natural monument and in 2000 a remarkable tree of France.

== See also ==
- List of botanical gardens in France
