= Arboretum et parc de la Rigolée =

Arboretum and town park in Auvergne, France

Coordinates: 46.5816°N 3.3137°E

The Arboretum et parc de la Rigolée is an arboretum and town park located on the Avenue des Isles in Avermes, Allier, Auvergne, France. It is open daily without charge.

== See also ==
- List of botanical gardens in France
