= Arboretum du Petit-Bois =

Arboretum in france

Coordinates: 49.27°N 5.142°E

The Arboretum du Petit-Bois (0.5 hectares) is an arboretum located in Montfaucon d'Argonne, Meuse, Lorraine, France. It began in 1996, contains about 50 types of trees, and is open daily without charge.

== See also ==
- List of botanical gardens in France
