= Jardin des plantes de La Rochelle =

Botanical garden in Nouvelle-Aquitaine, France

Coordinates: 46.1651°N 1.1505°W

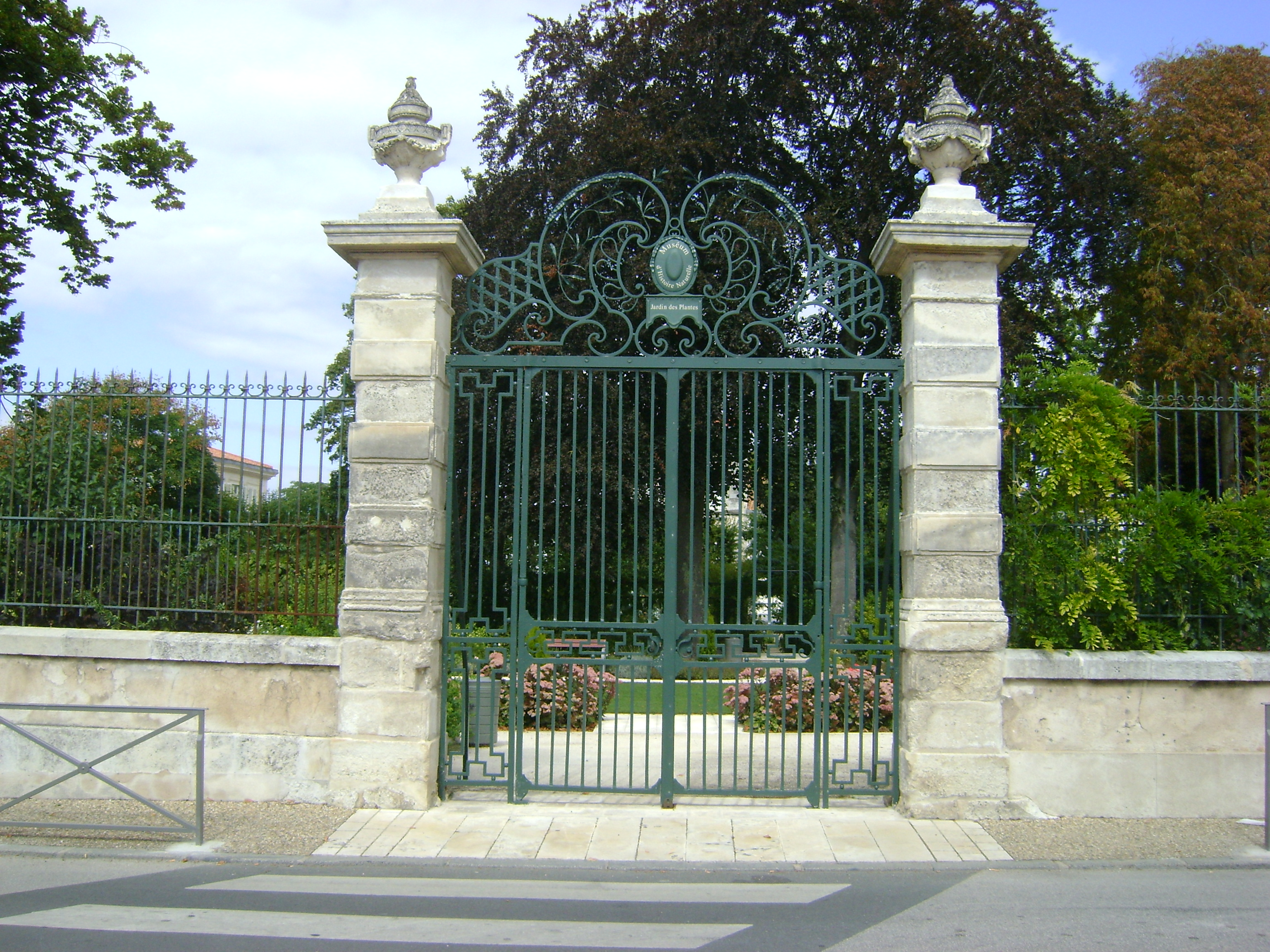

The Jardin des plantes de La Rochelle is a small botanical garden located behind the natural history museum at 28 rue Albert Ier, La Rochelle, Charente-Maritime, Nouvelle-Aquitaine, France. It is open daily without charge.

The garden was formerly owned by the Jesuits. In 1808 it became a municipal botanical garden as extension of the former Hôtel Jouin de la Tremblaye, but was quickly turned into a park. A new botanical garden has recently been established on the site, which now contains a collection of local plants, as well as species from China, North Africa, and North America.

== See also ==
- List of botanical gardens in France
