= Parc botanique de Suscinio =

Botanical garden in Brittany, France

Coordinates: 48°34′42″N 3°49′36″W

The Parc botanique de Suscinio (28,862 m^{2}) is a botanical garden located on the grounds of the Château de Suscinio, Morlaix, Finistère, in Brittany, north-west France. It is open daily; an admission fee is charged.

The château dates to the 11th-15th centuries; note that it is distinct from the better-known Château de Suscinio in Morbihan. Its botanical park was created in 2004 as an ambitious development project supported by Morlaix, but then closed for several years before reopening in 2008. Today the park contains parterres, gardens, and variety of trees, some of which are more than two centuries old and designated arbres remarquables de France (remarkable trees of France).

== See also ==
- List of botanical gardens in France
