= Arboretum de la Grand Prée =

Arboretum in Pays de la Loire, France

Coordinates: 48.008°N 0.198°W

The Arboretum de la Grand Prée (4 hectares) is an arboretum located at 2 impasse Petit Pavillon, Le Mans, Sarthe, Pays de la Loire, France. It is open by appointment.

== See also ==
- List of botanical gardens in France
