= Planet Exotica =

Commercial botanical garden in Nouvelle-Aquitaine, France

Coordinates: 45°37′48″N 1°00′45″W

Planet Exotica (7.6 hectares) is a commercial botanical garden located at 5 avenue des Fleurs de la Paix, Royan, Charente-Maritime, Nouvelle-Aquitaine, France. It is open daily; an admission fee is charged.

The gardens include Japanese gardens, Tuscan landscapes, a bonsai collection (400 m^{2}), an orchid greenhouse described as the largest in France (700 m^{2}, about 3,000 specimens), a butterfly conservatory, bamboo labyrinth with artificial fog, boat trips through the marshes, and water games. Of particular interest is an olive tree imported from Spain, 4m high, 7m in circumference, with an estimated age of 1800 years.

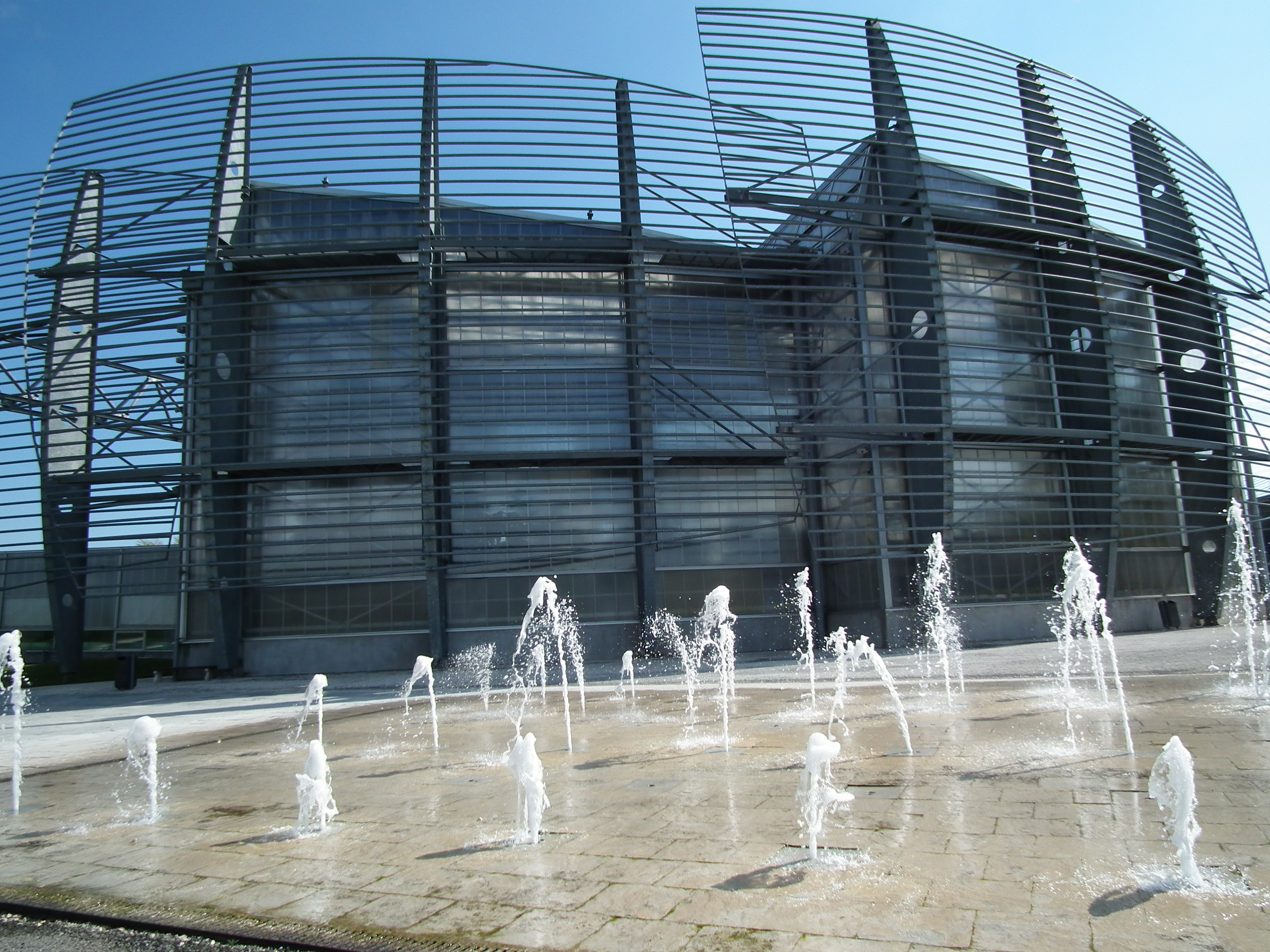
Planet Exotica

== See also ==
- List of botanical gardens in France
