= Arboretum du Treps =

Arboretum in Provence-Alpes-Côte d'Azur, France

Coordinates: 43.24°N 6.31°E

The Arboretum du Treps is an arboretum located near Collobrières, Var, Provence-Alpes-Côte d'Azur, France.

== See also ==
- List of botanical gardens in France
