= Conservatoire botanique national alpin de Gap-Charance =

National conservatory in Provence-Alpes-Côte d'Azur, France

Coordinates: 44.5763°N 6.0513°E

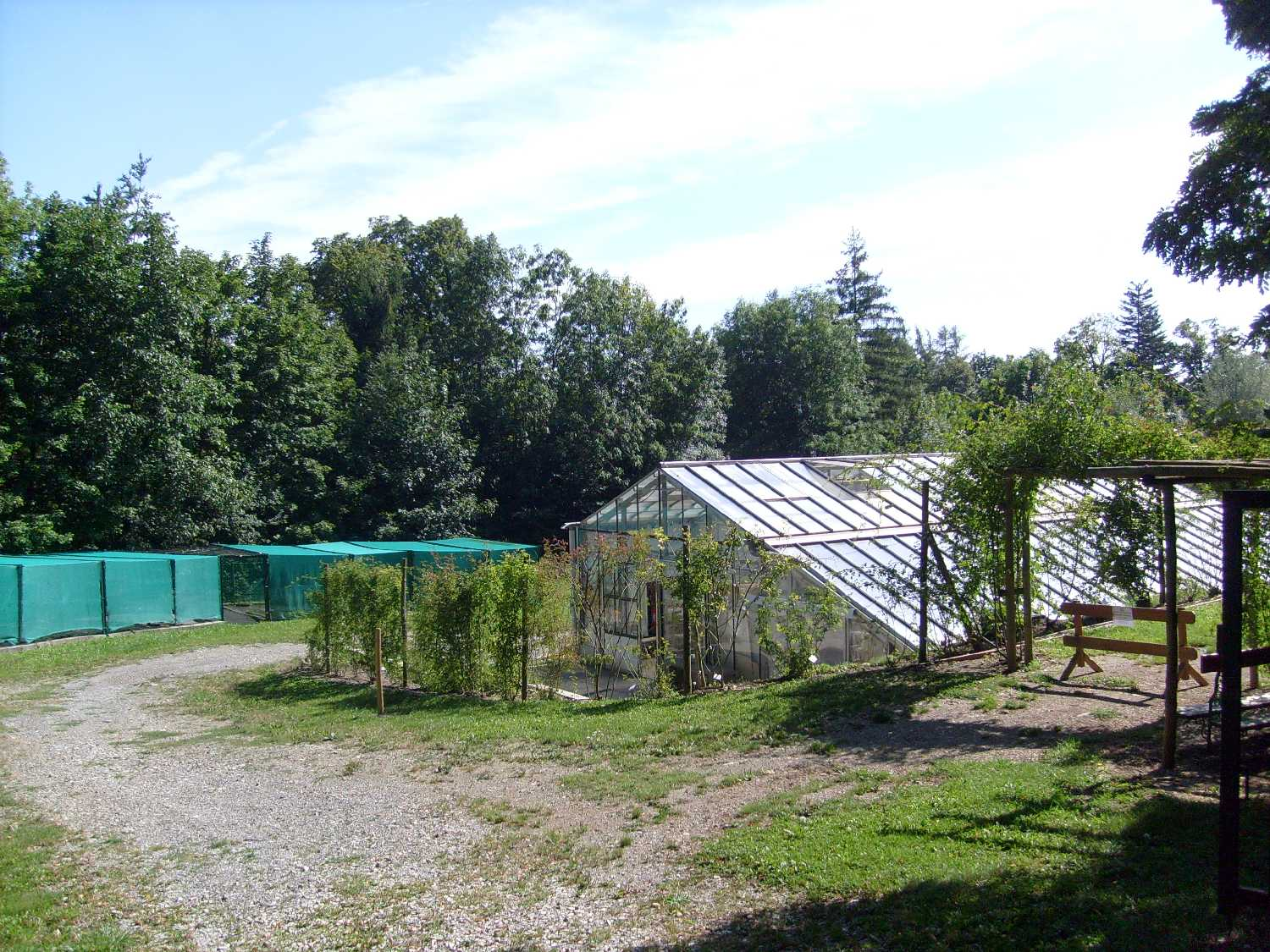
Greenhouse of the Conservatoire botanique national alpin

The Conservatoire botanique national alpin is a national conservatory specializing in alpine plants, located in the Domaine de Charance, about 4 km northwest of Gap, Hautes-Alpes, Provence-Alpes-Côte d'Azur, France.

The conservatory was established in 1993 by national statute to study and conserve alpine species in now seven adjacent French departments: Ain, Alpes de Haute-Provence, Hautes-Alpes, Drôme, Isère, Savoie, and Haute-Savoie. It is housed within the old stables of the domain, and maintains a small garden with greenhouses as well as an herbarium of about 100000 specimens.

The larger municipal Domaine de Charance comprises 220 hectares, with terraced garden, English park, and about 1500 varieties of old roses, 800 varieties of pears, and 550 varieties of apple trees.

== See also ==
- List of botanical gardens in France
