= Jardin botanique de Bayonne =

Botanical garden in Nouvelle-Aquitaine, France

Coordinates: 43.4923°N 1.4793°W

The Jardin botanique de Bayonne (3000 m^{2}), also known as the Jardin botanique des Remparts, is a botanical garden located at the Avenue du 11 Novembre and Allée de Tarride, Bayonne, Pyrénées-Atlantiques, Nouvelle-Aquitaine, France. It is open Tuesday through Saturday in the warmer months; admission is free.

The botanical garden was established in the late 1990s atop an existing 7-metre high bastion by Vauban, within the city's protected sector between its cathedral and ramparts, and overlooking its war memorial. It contains about 1,000 taxa arranged in 11 groupings, including bamboos, a fine collection of Japanese maples, fountain, waterfall, pond, Japanese bridge, and walkways created from recycled materials. It is served by free shuttle bus of the city center line at the stop number 7. Entry is free (easy access for the disabled) but no dogs allowed from Tuesday to Saturday from middle of April to middle of October, from 9:30 to 12:00 and from 14.00 to 18.00.

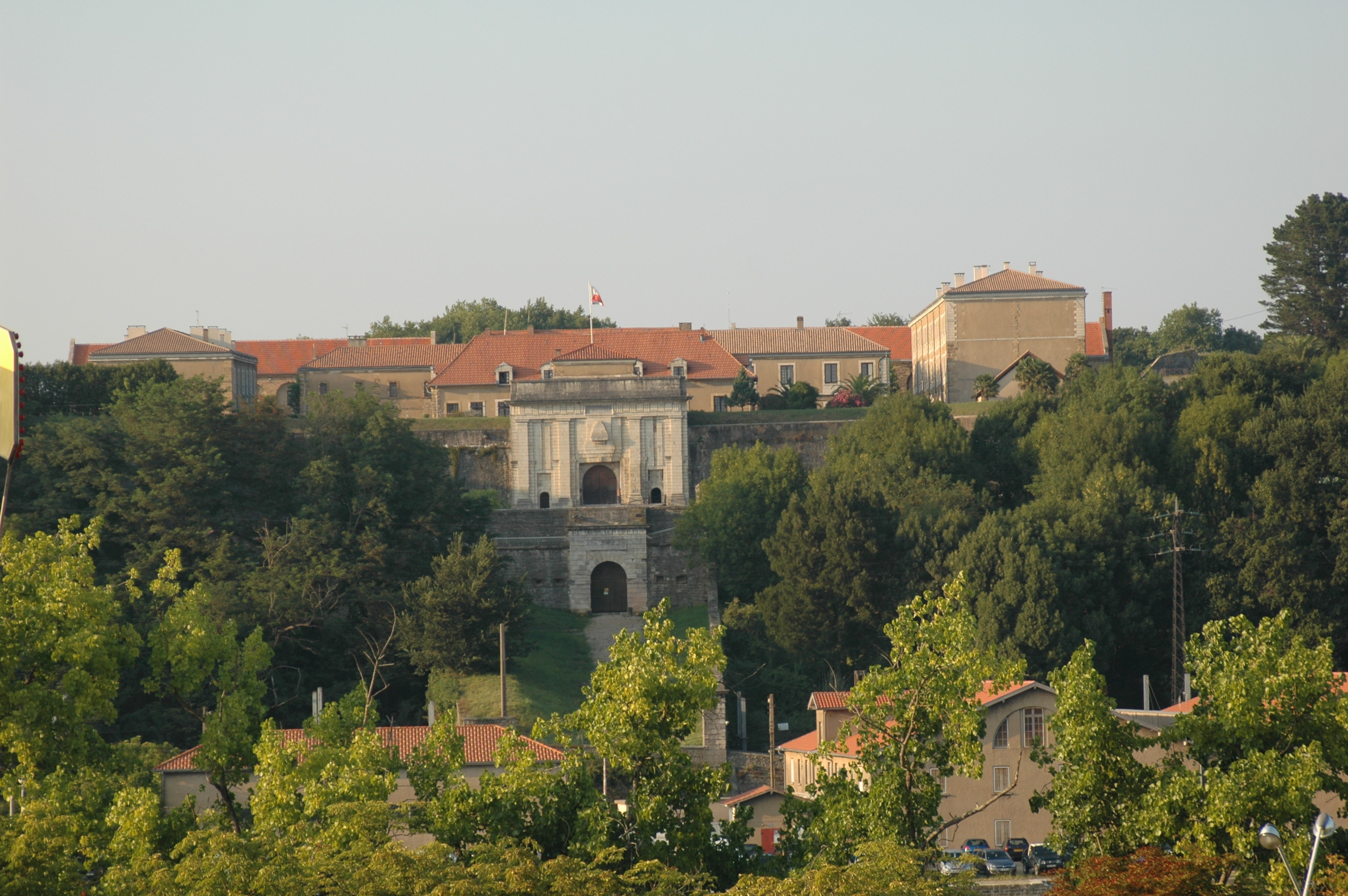
Jardin botanique de Bayonne

== See also ==
- List of botanical gardens in France
