= Jardin botanique de l'Arquebuse =

Botanical garden and arboretum in Bourgogne, France

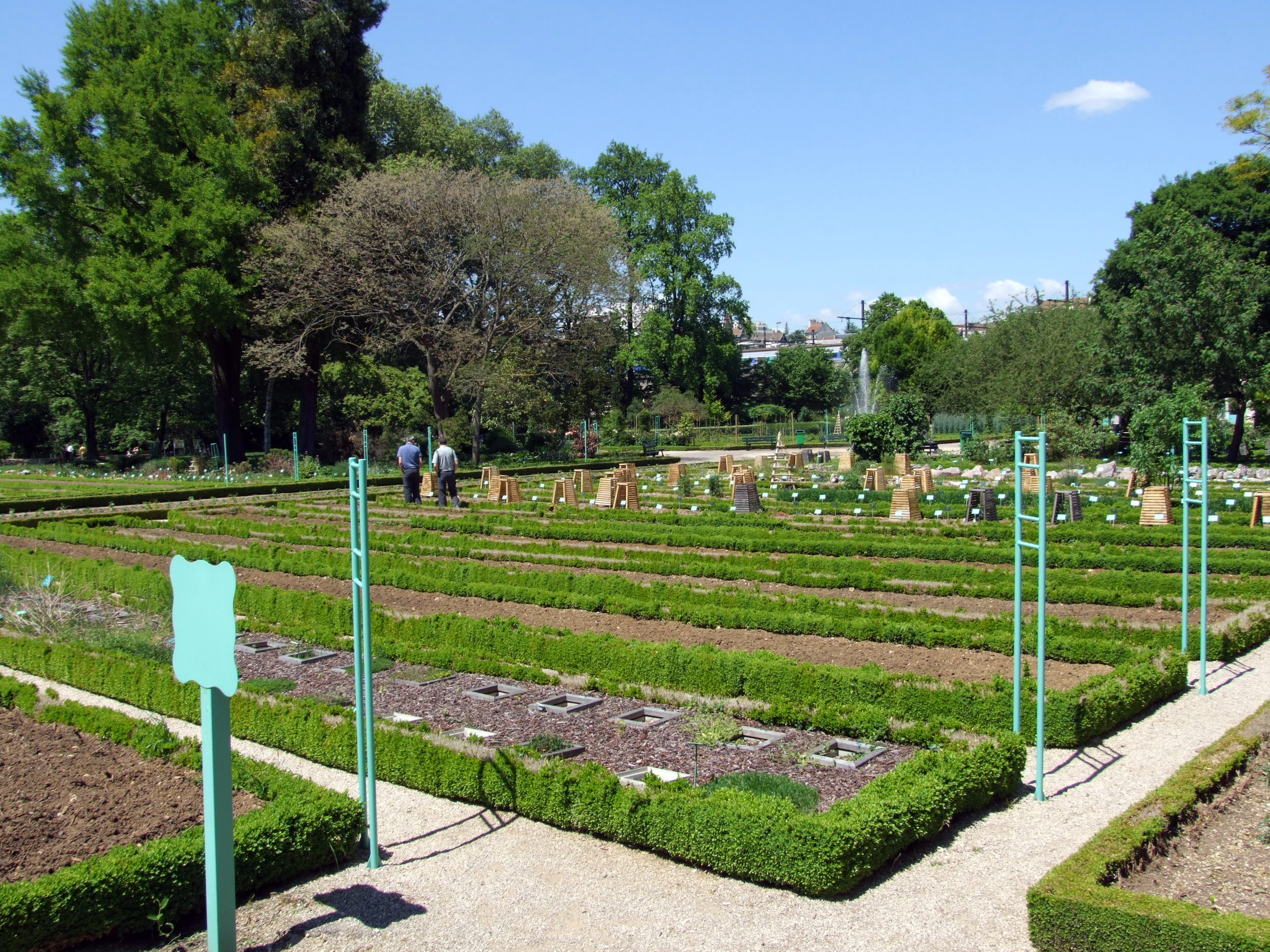
- Jardin botanique de l'Arquebuse in Dijon
- Interactive map of Jardin botanique de l'Arquebuse
- Type: Botanical garden and arboretum
- Location: 1 Avenue Albert-Premier, Dijon, Côte-d'Or, Bourgogne, France
- Coordinates: 47.3214°N 5.0279°E
- Area: 2 ha (botanical garden); 5 ha (entire park)
- Created: 18th century (as English garden); 1833 (current botanical garden)
- Operated by: City of Dijon
- Status: Open daily, free of charge
- Collections: ~4,000 plant species; Bourgogne flora; systematic collection; arboretum; herbarium (100,000 specimens)

The Jardin botanique de l'Arquebuse (2 hectares) is a botanical garden and arboretum located at 1 Avenue Albert-Premier, Dijon, Côte-d'Or, Bourgogne, France. It is open daily without charge.

The garden is located within a larger park and garden (5 hectares) created on the former 16th-century training grounds for chevaliers of the arquebus. There, in the late 18th century, the chevaliers' last captain built an English garden on the site to designs by noted landscaper Jean-Marie Morel, which in 1803 became city property. In 1833 the plants from Dijon's first botanical garden, established 1771 by writer Bénigne Legouz de Gerland (1695–1774), were transferred to form today's botanical garden, which was named a Conservatoire Botanique Régional in 2002.

Today the garden contains nearly 4,000 plant species with an emphasis on the flora of Bourgogne. Its collections include a systematic collection (3,352 taxa), regional flora of Bourgogne (1,423 taxa), French native plants (789 species), and 1,140 species from the rest of the world, with specimens of ornamental plants, food plants, succulents, carnivorous plants, subtropical plants, and Mediterranean plants. It also contains an arboretum, a herbarium containing about 100,000 specimens, greenhouses, and a school of botany, as well as an extensive collection of Anatidae (wild ducks, geese, and swans).

== See also ==
- List of botanical gardens in France
