= Jardin des Plantes de Poitiers =

Municipal park and botanical garden in Nouvelle-Aquitaine, France

Coordinates: 46.5875°N 0.3480°E

The Jardin des Plantes de Poitiers (1.5 hectares) is a municipal park and botanical garden located at 1 rue du Jardin des Plantes, Poitiers, Vienne, Nouvelle-Aquitaine, France. It is open daily without charge.

Poitiers' first Jardin des Plantes was established in 1621 by Le Coq Paschal, Dean of the Faculty of Medicine, but the garden was relocated 8 times before its establishment in 1869 on the former grounds of the Hôtel Dieu, its current location.

Today's garden is landscaped as an English park with winding pathways and pond, waterfall, and grotto. The park contains about one hundred species of trees and shrubs, including notable specimens of Cedrus atlantica, Cedrus deodara, Diospyros kaki, Ginkgo biloba, Quercus ilex, Quercus robur pyramidalis, Sequoiadendron, and Taxodium distichum.

The botanical garden was created at the initiative of Professors of Medicine for student instruction, and consists of thirty beds (total area 1700 m^{2}) of labeled plants, set within a larger, fenced collection of plants (4800 m^{2}). A tropical greenhouse (200 m^{2}), rebuilt in 1994, houses 145 plants including bromeliads, cacti, and several species of orchids.

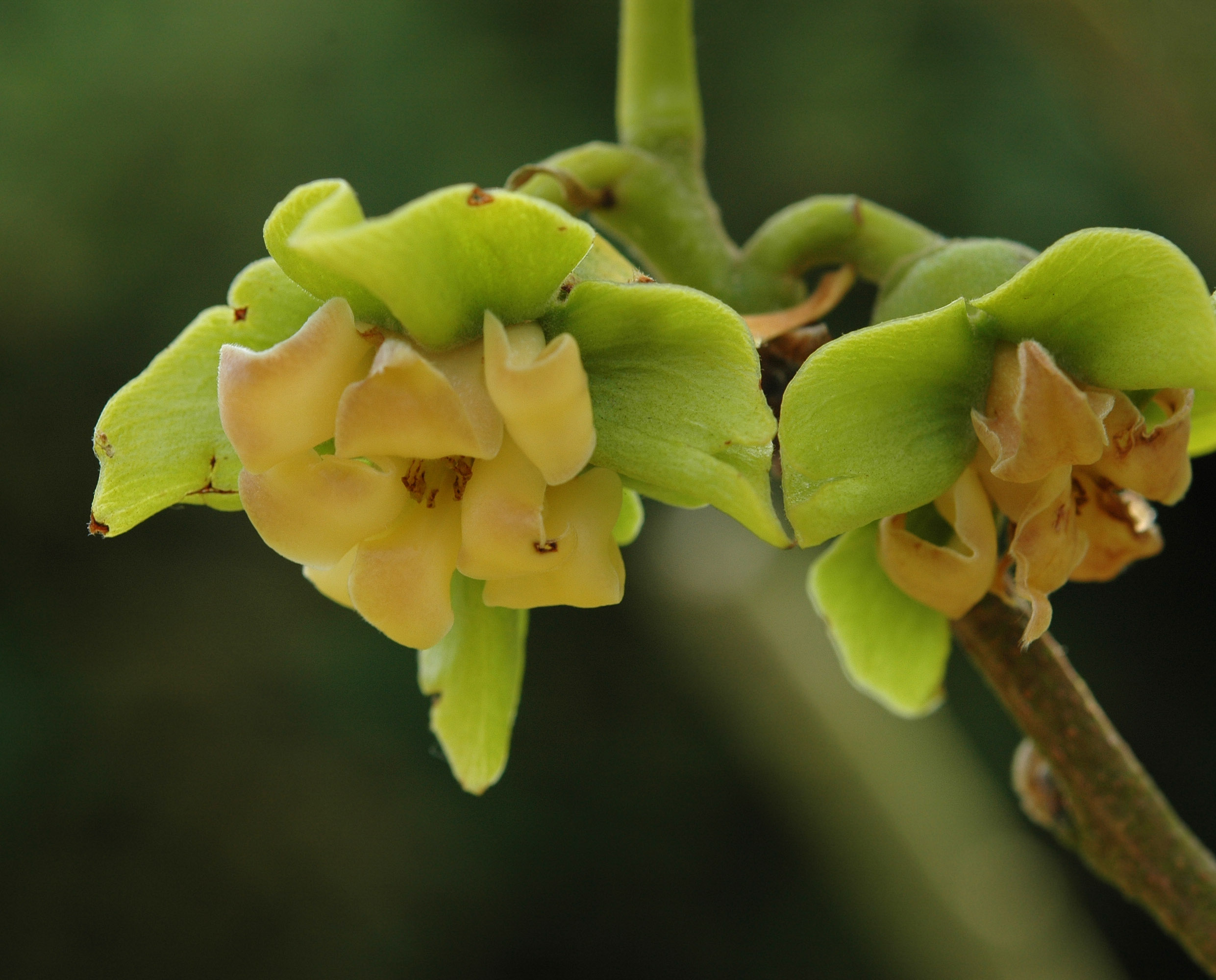
Jardin des Plantes de Poitiers

== See also ==
- List of botanical gardens in France
