= Jardin botanique de la Roche Fauconnière =

Botanical garden in Manche, Normandy, France

Coordinates: 49°37′59″N 1°37′00″W

The Jardin botanique de la Roche Fauconnière is a private botanical garden located in the Parc de la Fauconnière, Cherbourg-Octeville, Manche, Normandy, France. The garden was created in 1870 or 1873 by Alfred Favier and maintained by subsequent family members Léon Favier and Dr. Charles Favier. Today it contains 3,400 taxa, many from the Southern Hemisphere, with eucalyptus, magnolia, and unusual specimens including Ilex nothofagifolia and Pseudopanax laetevirens. It is open by appointment only.

== See also ==
- List of botanical gardens in France
