= Conservatoire du Bégonia =

Botanical garden in France

Coordinates: 45.9245°N 0.9558°W

The Conservatoire du Bégonia (1,000 m^{2}) is a botanical garden specializing in begonias. It is located at 1 rue Charles Plumier, Rochefort, Charente-Maritime, Nouvelle-Aquitaine, France, and open for guided tours several days per week in early spring and late fall; an admission fee is charged.

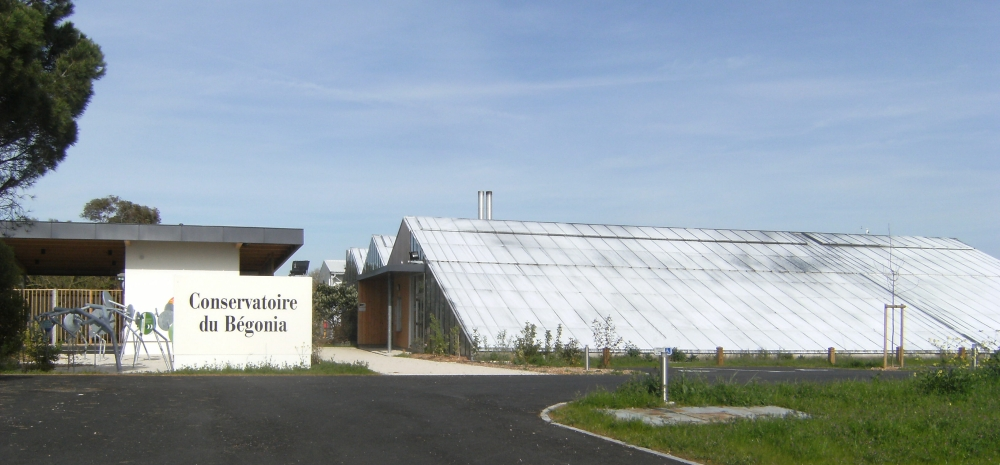
Conservatoire du Bégonia

== History ==
The conservatory was established in 1988 in honor of royal botanist Charles Plumier (1646–1704), who discovered begonias while on an American expedition, and Michel Bégon (1638-1710), expedition organizer and Rochefort intendant, for whom the flower was named in 1690. Thanks to their efforts, Rochefort was famed for its importation of exotic plants during the 17th-18th centuries, especially coffee. The conservatory's original 650 m^{2} floor space was extended in 1993 by a further 350 m^{2}. Its collection has grown by trades, purchases, and expeditions to South America and Cameroon.

== Today ==
Today the conservatory serves as the National Collection of the genus Begonia, and contains over 500 species and 1,000 hybrid varieties. It describes itself as the world's largest begonia collection.

== See also ==
- List of botanical gardens in France
