= Jardin botanique de Cayenne =

Botanical garden in Cayenne, French Guiana

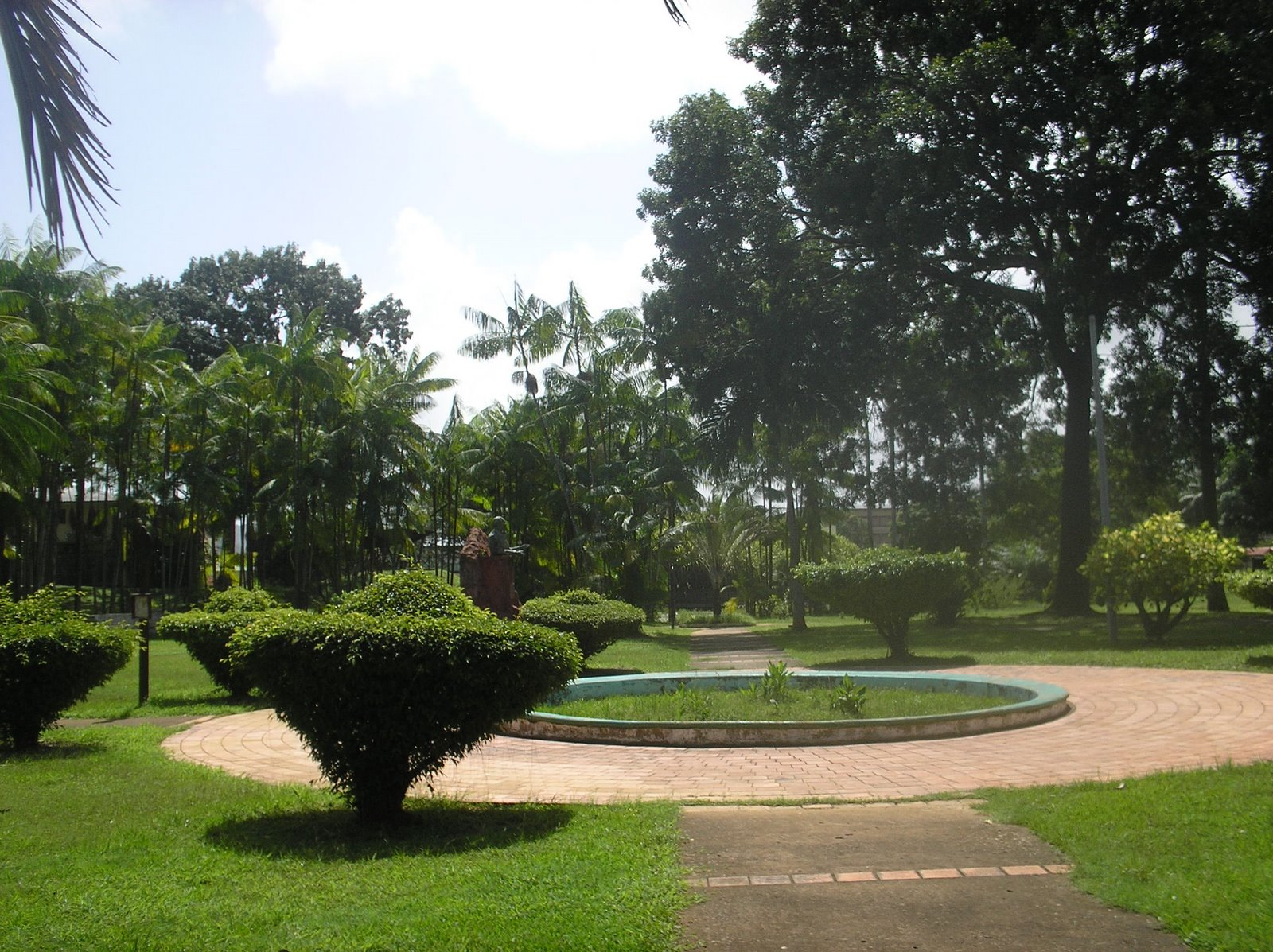
- Interactive map of Jardin botanique de Cayenne
- Type: Botanical garden
- Location: Cayenne, French Guiana
- Coordinates: 4.9390°N 52.3203°W
- Area: 3 hectares (7.4 acres)
- Created: 1879
- Status: Public park

The Jardin botanique de Cayenne is a botanical garden located at the end of the Avenue Charles de Gaulle, adjacent to the university, in Cayenne, French Guiana. The garden measures 3 hectares. Although the Conseil Général de la Guyane states that the garden, formerly the Jardin du Roi (King's Garden), was established in 1879, there are earlier references to a botanical garden in Cayenne. It now contains a statue of politician Gaston Monnerville (1897-1991).

== See also ==
- List of botanical gardens in France
