= Jardin botanique des Causses =

Botanical garden in Occitania, France

Coordinates: 44°05′55″N 3°04′42″E

The Jardin botanique des Causses (6,000 m²) is a botanical garden located at 17 Avenue Charles de Gaulle, Millau, Aveyron, Occitania, France. It is open daily without charge.

The garden was created in 1996 within the Parc de la Victoire. It contains more than 3500 trees and shrubs representing 80 species of the area's limestone plateau and nearby Regional Natural Park des Grands Causses. Plants of interest include arbutus, beech, Cedar of Lebanon, liquidambar, oak, redwood, collections of roses and ophrys of Aveyron, and displays of about 10,000 flowering plants renewed twice a year.

== See also ==
- List of botanical gardens in France
