= Jardin géo-botanique =

Botanical garden in Bourgogne, France

Coordinates: 46.7856°N 4.8604°E

The Jardin géo-botanique (1.3 hectares) is a municipal botanical garden located at 1, Place Mathias, Chalon-sur-Saône, Saône-et-Loire, Bourgogne, France. It is open daily without charge.

The garden was established in 1953 by the Society of Natural History and Mycology of Saône-et-Loire under the active direction of its president, Dr. Gilbert Durand, and has been maintained by the city since 1959. Today, the garden contains about 600 plant taxa set within eight areas of regional scenery, including water, limestone, granite, swamps, pine lands, Provence, aromatic and medicinal plants, and a perennial garden.

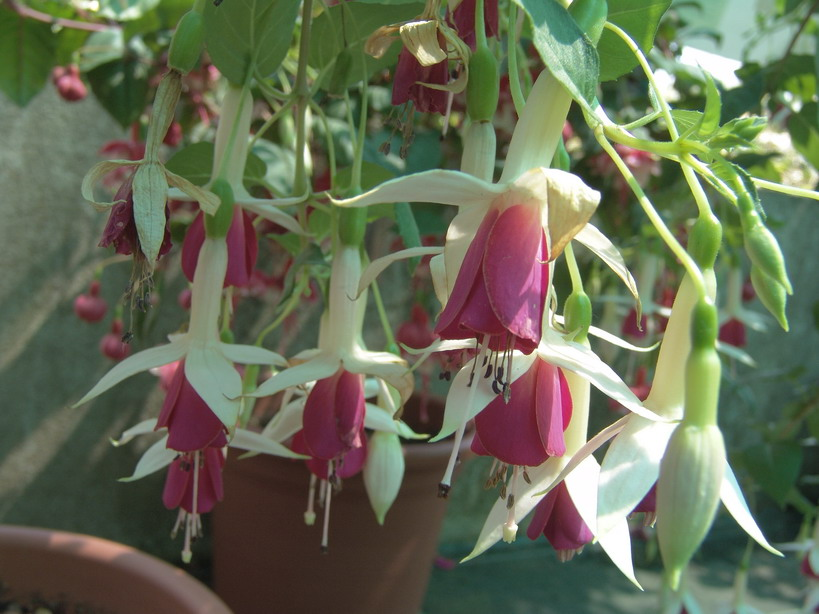
Jardin géo-botanique

== See also ==
- List of botanical gardens in France
