= Jardin botanique de l'Hôpital d'Instruction des Armées Clermont-Tonnerre =

Botanical garden in Brittany, France

Coordinates: 48°23′27″N 4°29′08″W

The Jardin botanique de l'Hôpital d'Instruction des Armées Clermont-Tonnerre (Botanical Garden of the Teaching Hospital of the Clermont-Tonnerre Armies; Breton: Liorzh louzawouriezh Ospital pedagogel an armeoù Clermont-Tonnerre) is a botanical garden located on the grounds of the Hôpital d'Instruction des Armées Clermont-Tonnerre at Rue du Colonel Fonferrier, Brest, Finistère, in the region of Brittany, France. It is open to the public weekend afternoons; admission is free.

The garden was begun in 1688 by Desclouzeaux, Intendant de la Marine at Brest, as a jardin des simples for herbs and medicines on the grounds of the royal naval hospital (established 1684). Under the supervision of chief gardener Antoine Laurent (1744-1820) it developed greatly to become an important adjunct to the Jardin du Roi (now Jardin des Plantes) in Paris, as Brest's mild climate favored the cultivation of a wide variety of exotic plants from around the world. By the 19th century it had become a major botanical garden, but the slow withering of its original medical function led to a progressive decline. The garden's remnants were almost totally destroyed in World War II, along with the hospital itself, but in subsequent years the garden has been gradually been restored.

Today the garden's terraces are again open to the public, and still display some 19th-century accessions. The garden is described in Actu Santé as containing the oldest two Chinese palms in Europe, the largest Ginkgo biloba in Europe, and excellent specimens of Camellias and Gunnera manicata. Rare and valuable specimens are identified by signs.

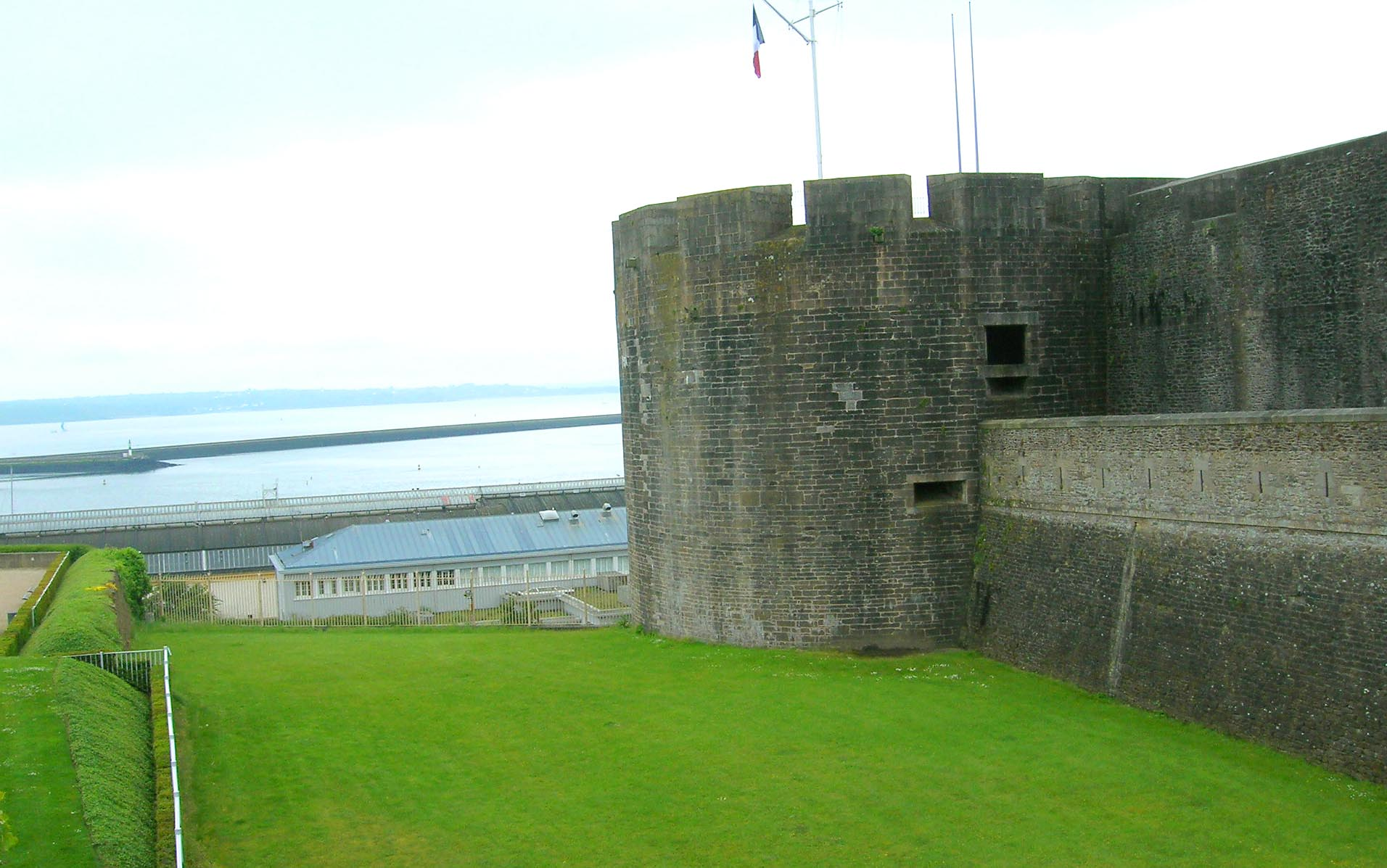
Jardin botanique de l'Hôpital d'Instruction des Armées Clermont-Tonnerre

== See also ==
- List of botanical gardens in France
