= La Bussière, Vienne =

La Bussière
- Commune
- Location of La Bussière
- Location within France Location within Nouvelle-Aquitaine
- Coordinates: 46°38′07″N 0°49′28″E
- Country: France
- Region: Nouvelle-Aquitaine
- Department: Vienne
- Arrondissement: Montmorillon
- Canton: Montmorillon

Government
  - Mayor (2020–2026): Éric Viaud
- Area^{1}: 32.09 km^{2} (12.39 sq mi)
- Elevation: 129 m (423 ft)
- Highest elevation: 143 m (469 ft)
- Lowest elevation: 69 m (226 ft)
- Population (2023): 298
  - Density: 9.29/km^{2} (24.1/sq mi)
- Time zone: UTC+01:00 (CET)
  - Summer (DST): UTC+02:00 (CEST)
- INSEE/Postal code: 86040 /86310
- ^{1} French Land Register data, which excludes lakes, ponds, glaciers > 1 km^{2} (0.386 sq mi or 247 acres) and river estuaries.

La Bussière (French pronunciation: [la bysjɛʁ]) is a commune in the Vienne department in the Nouvelle-Aquitaine region in western France.

== Points of interest ==
- Jardin botanique et verger de La Bussière

== See also ==
- Communes of the Vienne department
