= Fontaine-les-Coteaux =

- Commune
- Coat of arms
- Location of Fontaine-les-Coteaux
- Location within France Location within Centre-Val de Loire
- Coordinates: 47°47′59″N 0°49′46″E
- Country: France
- Region: Centre-Val de Loire
- Department: Loir-et-Cher
- Arrondissement: Vendôme
- Canton: Le Perche
- Intercommunality: CA Territoires Vendômois

Government
  - Mayor (2020–2026): Philippe Braem
- Area^{1}: 22.11 km^{2} (8.54 sq mi)
- Elevation: 120 m (390 ft)
- Highest elevation: 154 m (505 ft)
- Lowest elevation: 63 m (207 ft)
- Population (2023): 342
  - Density: 15.5/km^{2} (40.1/sq mi)
- Time zone: UTC+01:00 (CET)
  - Summer (DST): UTC+02:00 (CEST)
- INSEE/Postal code: 41087 /41800
- ^{1} French Land Register data, which excludes lakes, ponds, glaciers > 1 km^{2} (0.386 sq mi or 247 acres) and river estuaries.

Fontaine-les-Coteaux (French pronunciation: [fɔ̃tɛn le kɔto]) is a commune in the Loir-et-Cher department of central France.

== Population ==
Historical population
Year	Pop.	±% p.a.
1968	435	—
1975	366	−2.44%
1982	337	−1.17%
1990	353	+0.58%
1999	343	−0.32%
2007	382	+1.36%
2012	381	−0.05%
2017	337	−2.42%
2023	342	+0.25%
Source: INSEE

== Sights ==
- Arboretum de la Fosse

== See also ==
- Communes of the Loir-et-Cher department
