= Saint-Jean-de-la-Motte =

- Commune
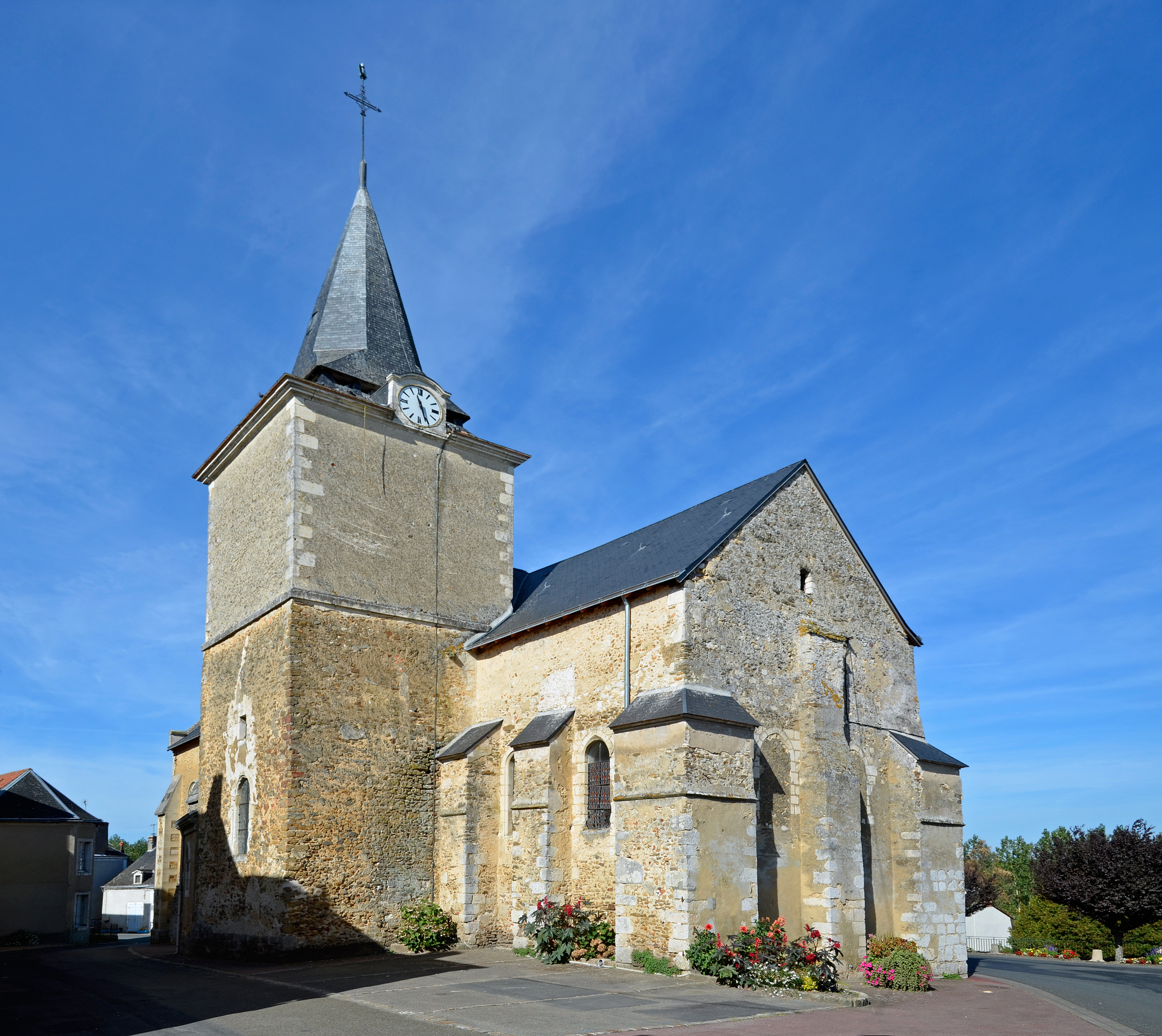
- The church of Saint-Jean-Baptiste

- Coat of arms
- Location of Saint-Jean-de-la-Motte
- Location within France Location within Pays de la Loire
- Coordinates: 47°44′31″N 0°03′25″E
- Country: France
- Region: Pays de la Loire
- Department: Sarthe
- Arrondissement: La Flèche
- Canton: Le Lude
- Intercommunality: Sud Sarthe

Government
  - Mayor (2020–2026): Jean Gouband
- Area^{1}: 32.03 km^{2} (12.37 sq mi)
- Highest elevation: 109 m (358 ft)
- Lowest elevation: 40 m (130 ft)
- Population (2023): 955
  - Density: 29.8/km^{2} (77.2/sq mi)
- Demonym(s): Mottais, Mottaise
- Time zone: UTC+01:00 (CET)
  - Summer (DST): UTC+02:00 (CEST)
- INSEE/Postal code: 72291 /72510
- ^{1} French Land Register data, which excludes lakes, ponds, glaciers > 1 km^{2} (0.386 sq mi or 247 acres) and river estuaries.

Saint-Jean-de-la-Motte (French pronunciation: [sɛ̃ ʒɑ̃ də la mɔt]) is a commune in the Sarthe department in the region of Pays de la Loire in north-western France.

== See also ==
- Communes of the Sarthe department
