= Trégomeur =

Trégomeur Tregonveur
- Commune
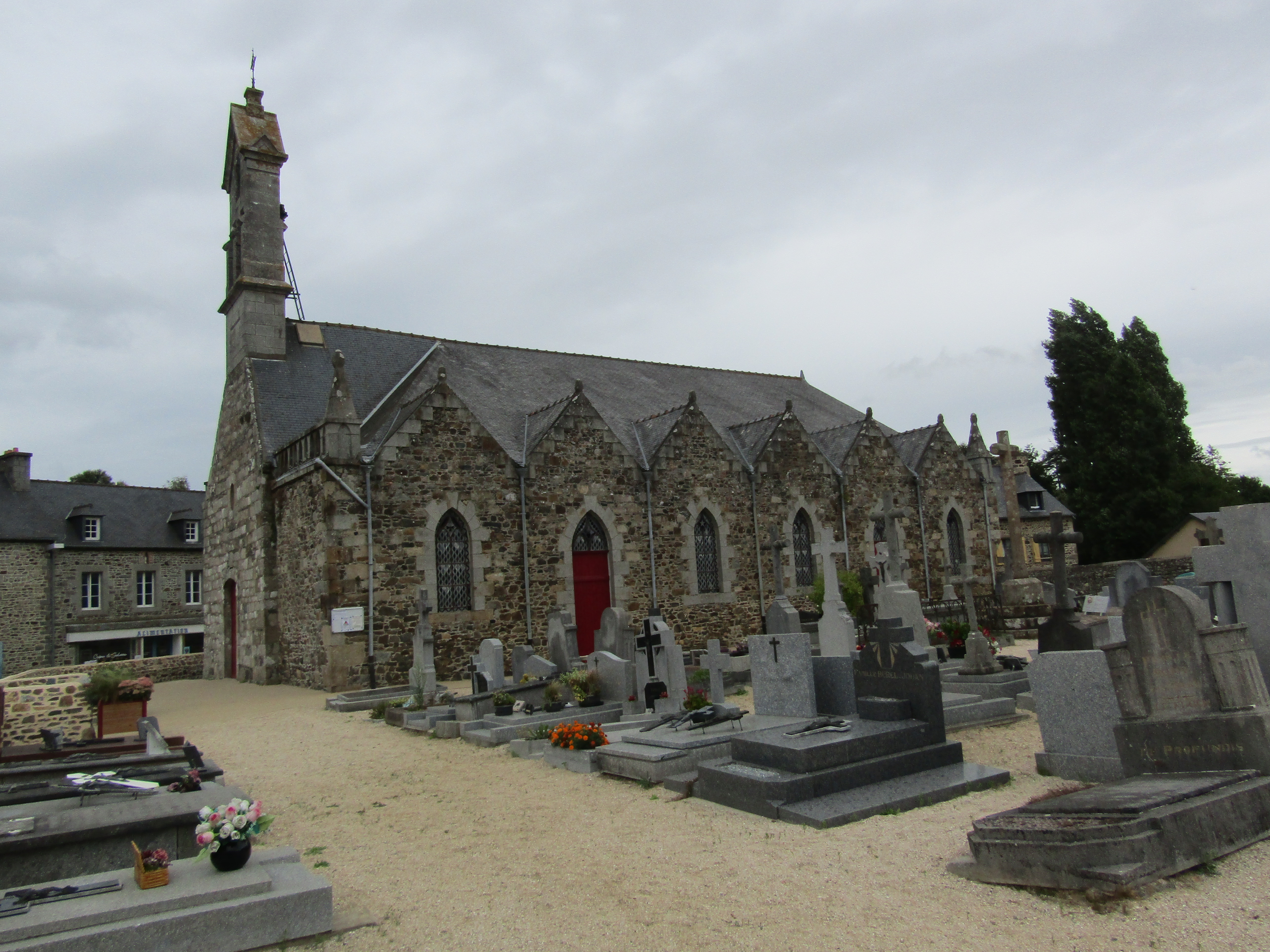
- The church of Saint-Gildas, in Trégomeur

- Coat of arms
- Location of Trégomeur
- Location within France Location within Brittany
- Coordinates: 48°33′59″N 2°52′50″W
- Country: France
- Region: Brittany
- Department: Côtes-d'Armor
- Arrondissement: Guingamp
- Canton: Plélo

Government
  - Mayor (2020–2026): Denis Manac'h
- Area^{1}: 10.37 km^{2} (4.00 sq mi)
- Highest elevation: 123 m (404 ft)
- Lowest elevation: 20 m (66 ft)
- Population (2023): 945
  - Density: 91.1/km^{2} (236/sq mi)
- Time zone: UTC+01:00 (CET)
  - Summer (DST): UTC+02:00 (CEST)
- INSEE/Postal code: 22356 /22590
- ^{1} French Land Register data, which excludes lakes, ponds, glaciers > 1 km^{2} (0.386 sq mi or 247 acres) and river estuaries.

Trégomeur (French pronunciation: [tʁeɡɔmœʁ]; Breton: Tregonveur) is a commune in the Côtes-d'Armor department of Brittany in northwestern France.

== Population ==
Historical population
Year	Pop.	±% p.a.
1968	595	—
1975	610	+0.36%
1982	689	+1.75%
1990	682	−0.13%
1999	729	+0.74%
2007	877	+2.34%
2012	927	+1.12%
2017	938	+0.24%
2023	945	+0.12%
Source: INSEE

Inhabitants of Trégomeur are called trégomeurois in French.

== See also ==
- Communes of the Côtes-d'Armor department
- Zooparc de Trégomeur
