= Zooparc de Trégomeur =

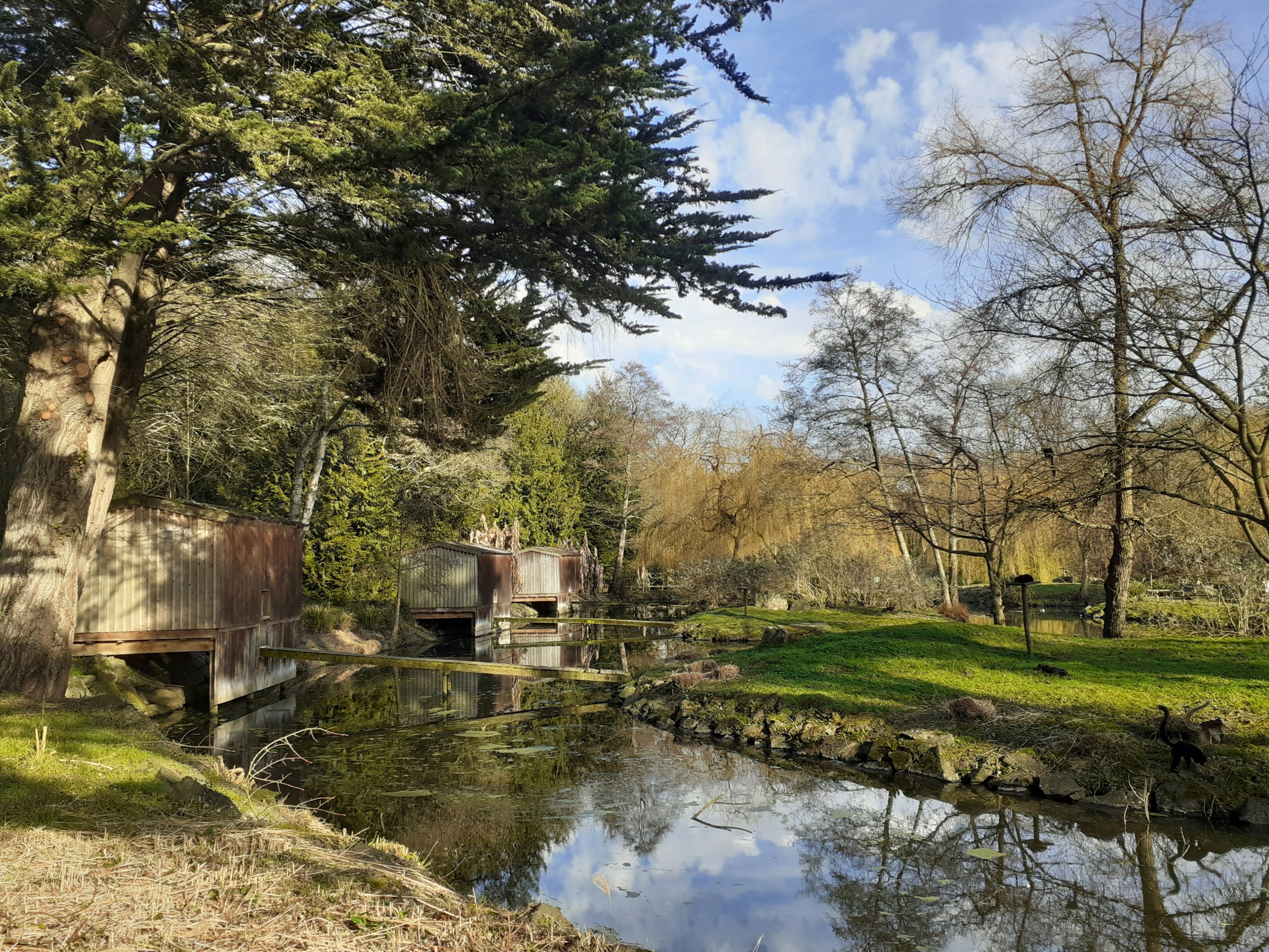
- Lemur enclosures in Zooparc de Trégomeur, 202
- Interactive map of Zooparc de Trégomeur
- 48°35′04″N 2°52′56″W
- Date opened: 2007
- Location: Trégomeur, Côtes-d'Armor, Brittany, France
- Land area: 14 ha (35 acres)
- Website: www.zoo-tregomeur.com

The Trégomeur Zoopark (Breton: Park loened-loened Tregomer) is a zoological park and botanical garden located on 14 hectares in a valley in the commune of Trégomeur in the Côtes-d'Armor department in Brittany. Owned by the department, its mission is the conservation of species and the presentation of animals in their ecosystem. The zoo specializes on the nature of Asia and Madagascar and includes more than 300 animals representing around 60 different species. In 2018, the park attendance was 88,000 visitors.

== Gallery ==
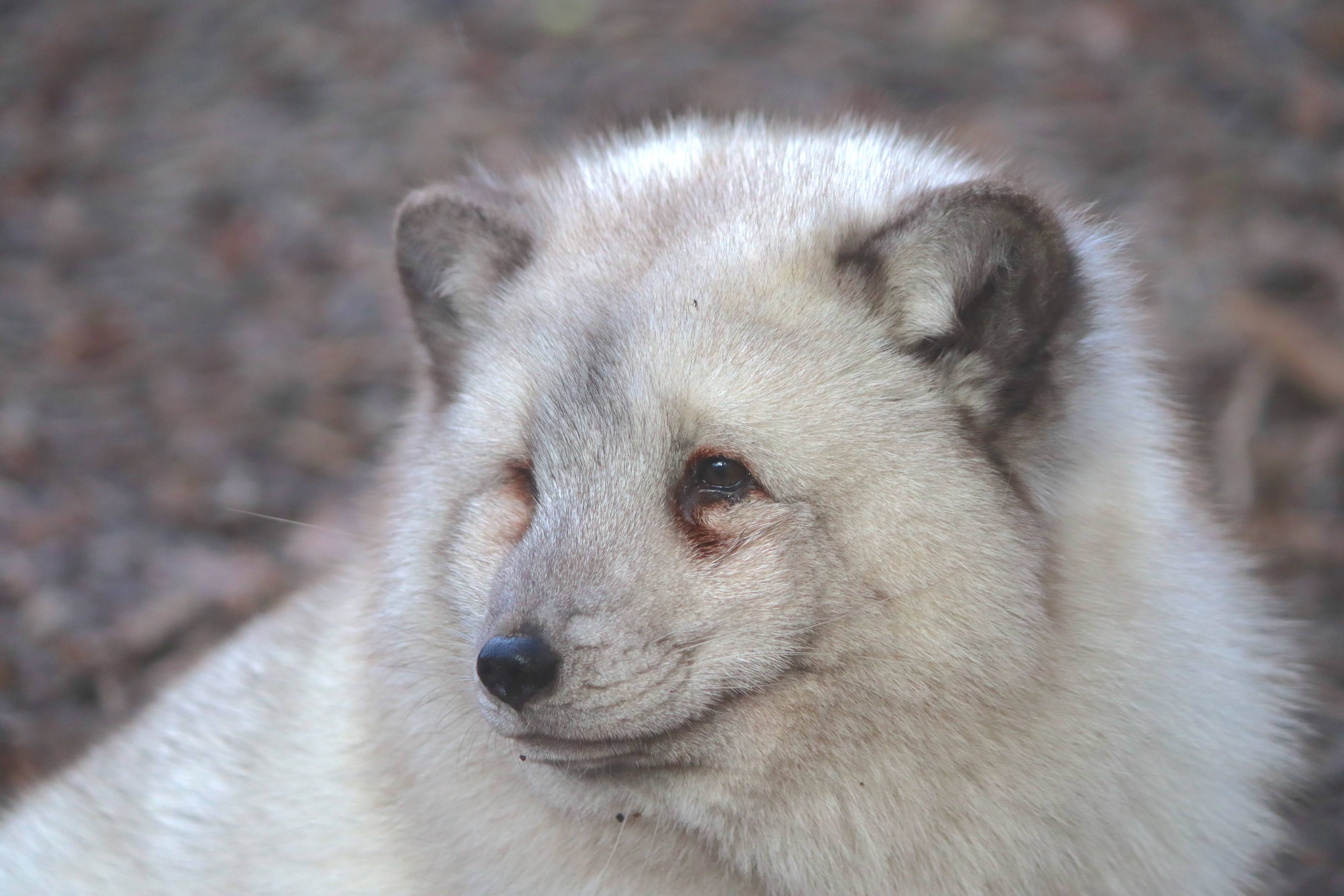
Arctic fox (Vulpes lagopus) in Zooparc de Trégomeur, 2025

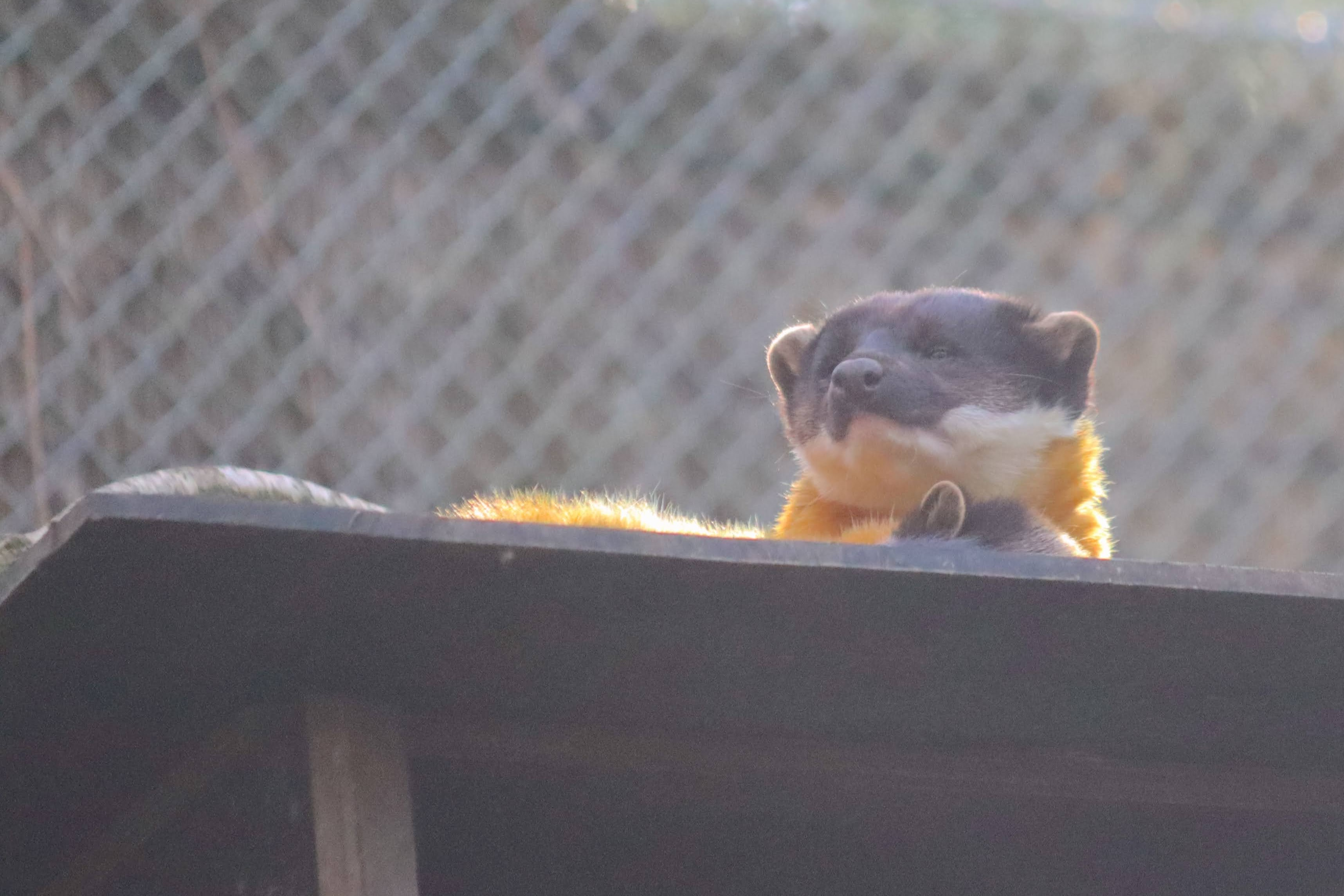
Yellow-throated marten (Martes flavigula) in Zooparc de Trégomeur, 2025

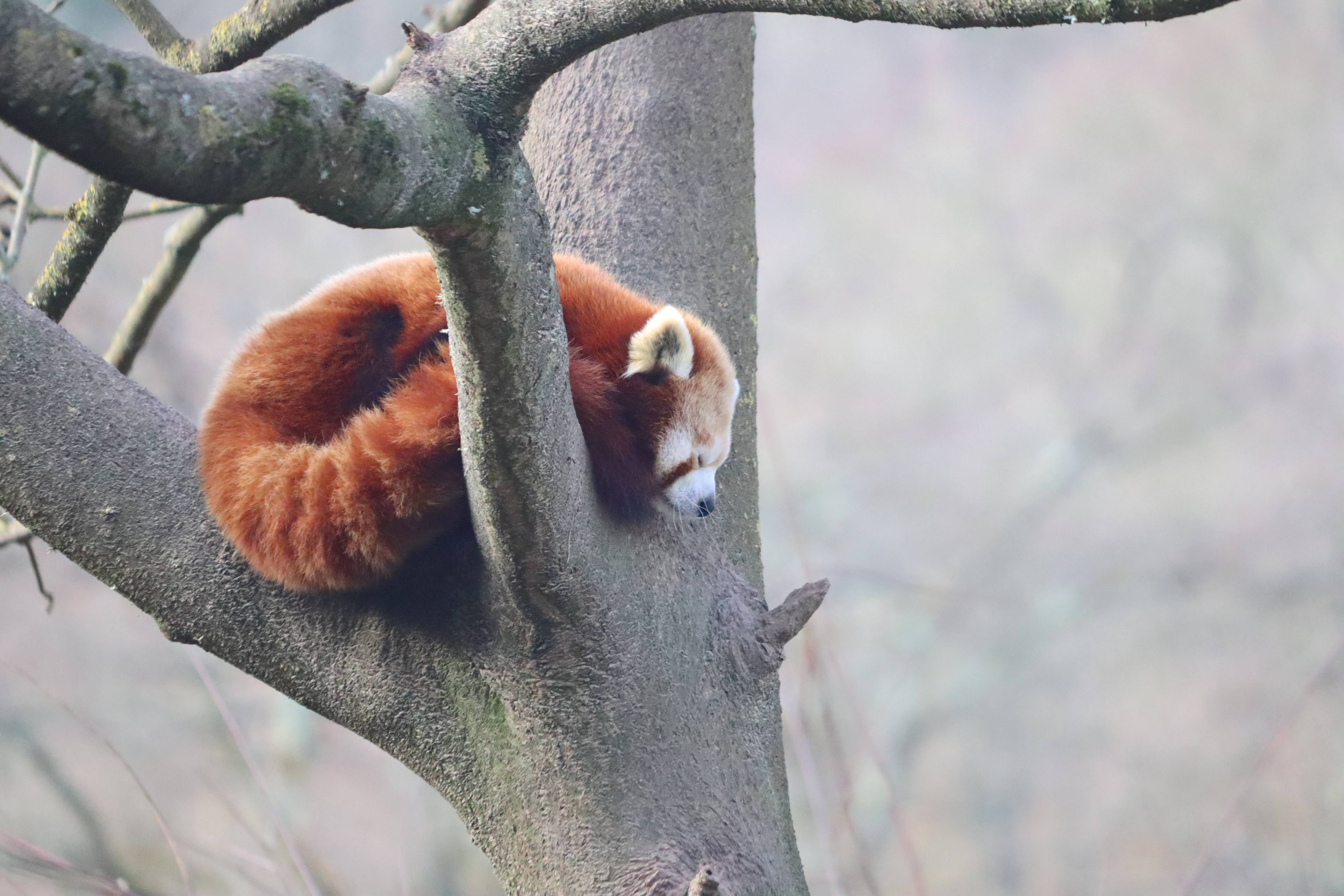
Red panda (Ailurus fulgens) in Zooparc de Trégomeur, 2025

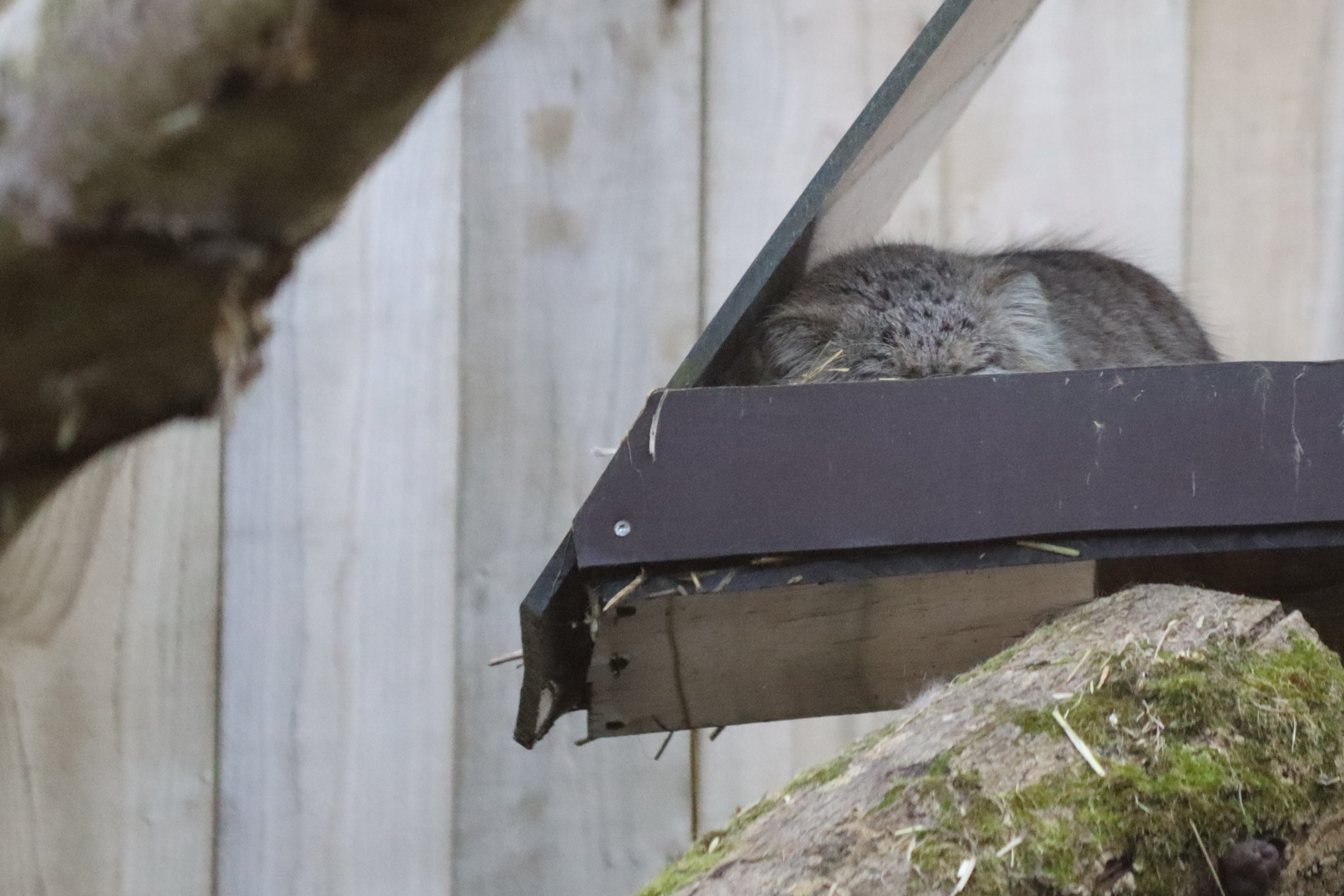
Pallas's cat (Otocolobus manul) in Zooparc de Trégomeur, 2025

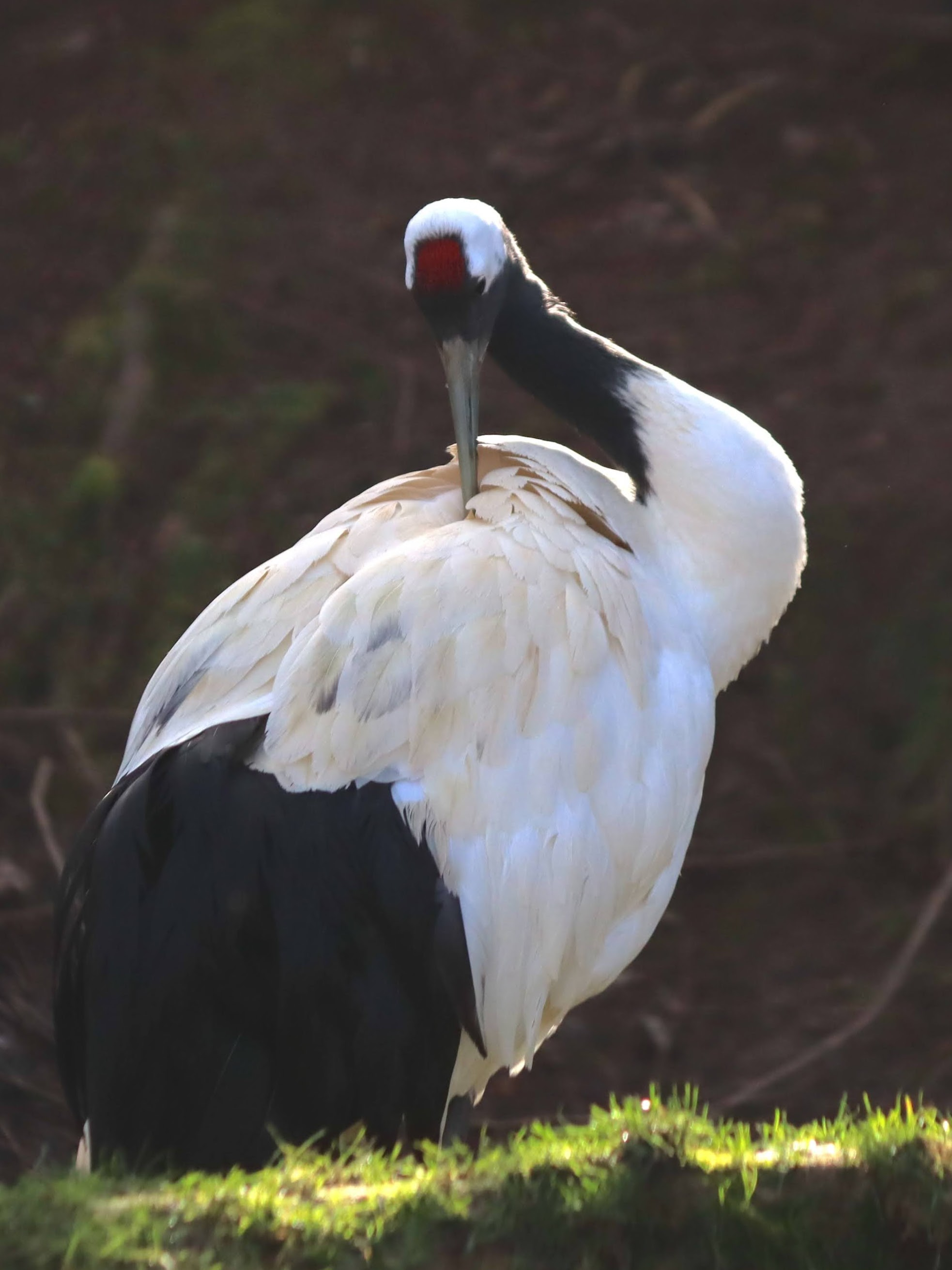
Red-crowned crane (Grus japonensis) in Zooparc de Trégomeur, 2025

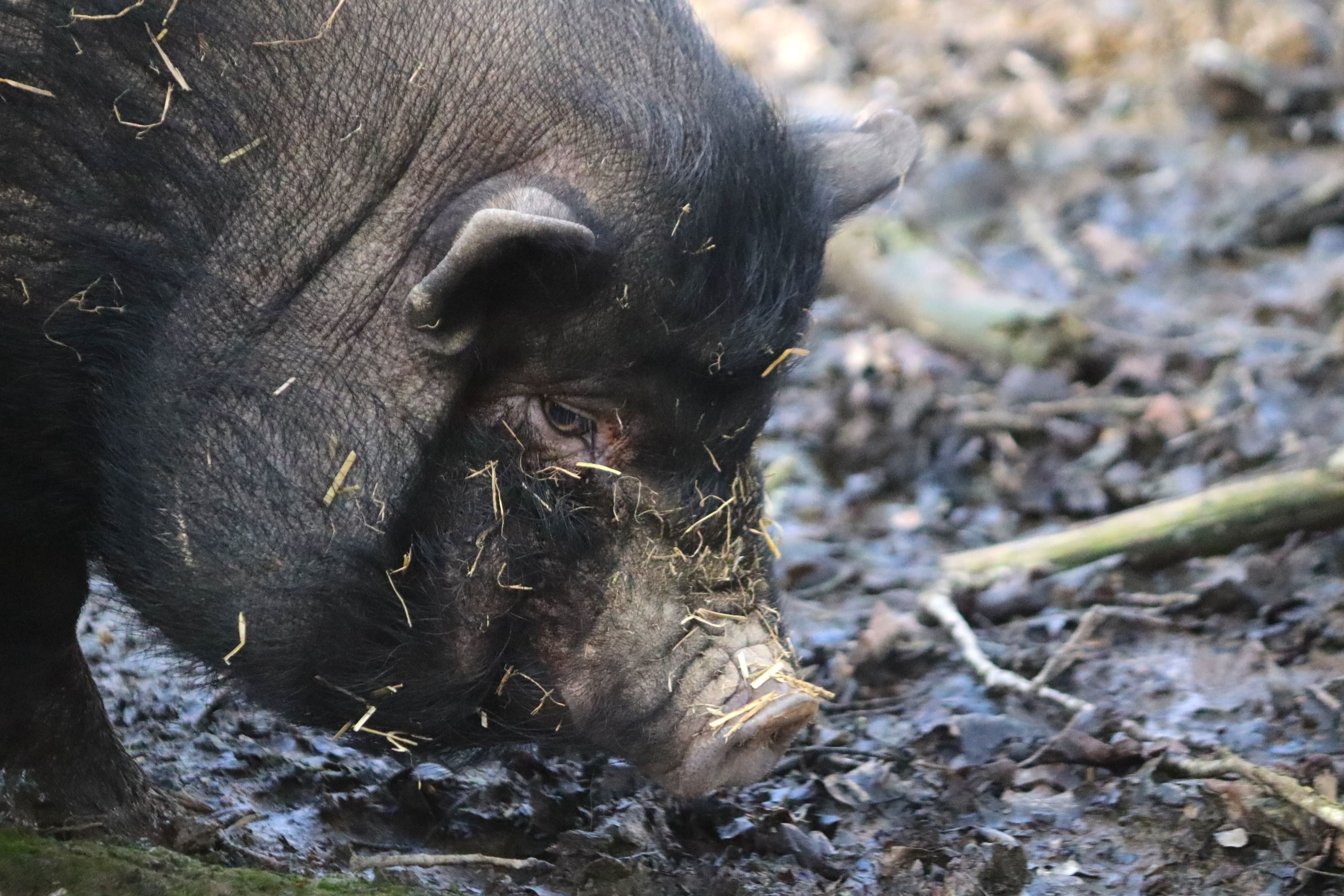
Vietnamese Pot-bellied pig in Zooparc de Trégomeur, 2025

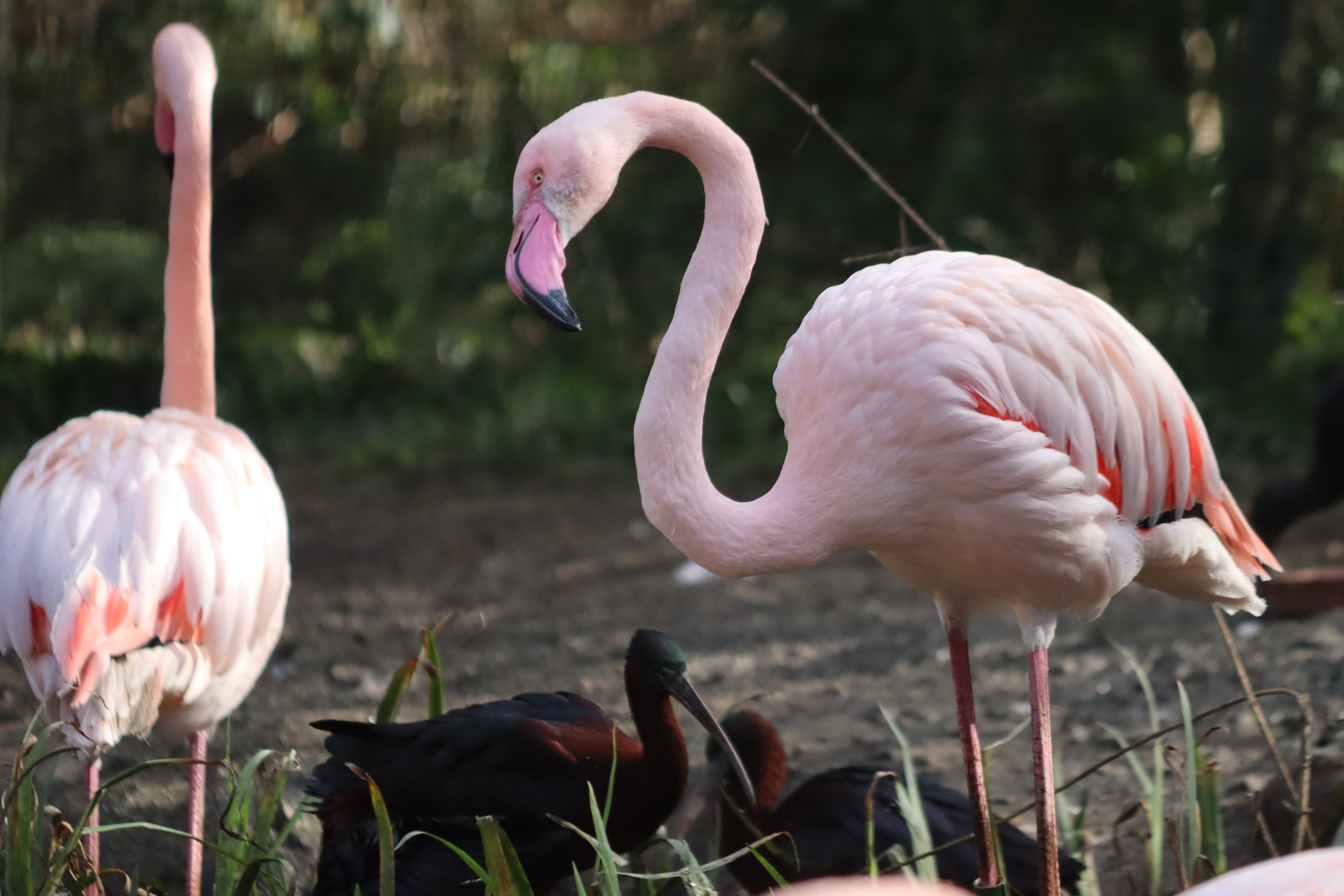
Greater flamingo (Phoenicopterus roseus) and glossy ibis (Plegadis falcinellus) in Zooparc de Trégomeur, 2025

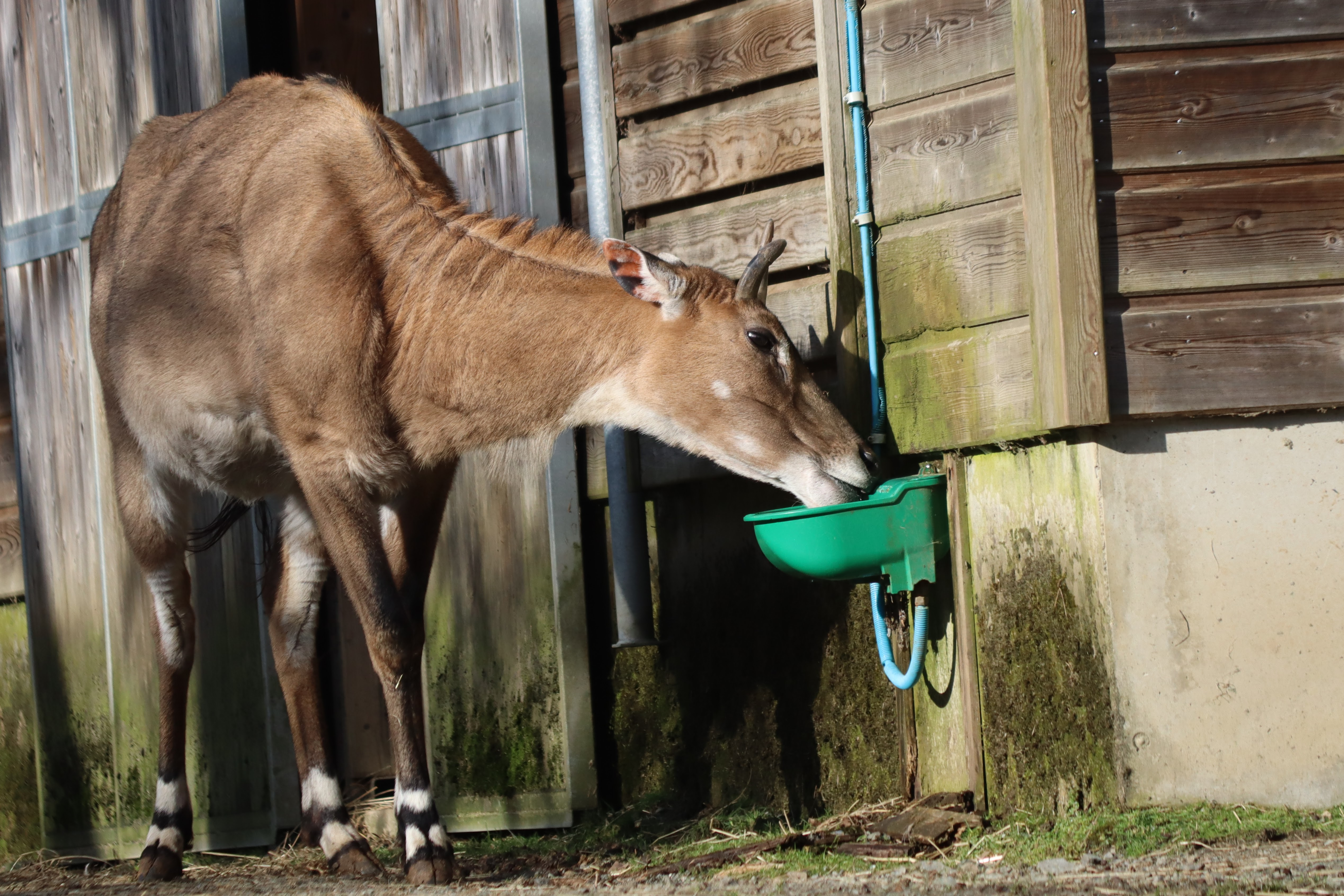
Nilgai (Boselaphus tragocamelus) in Zooparc de Trégomeur, 2025

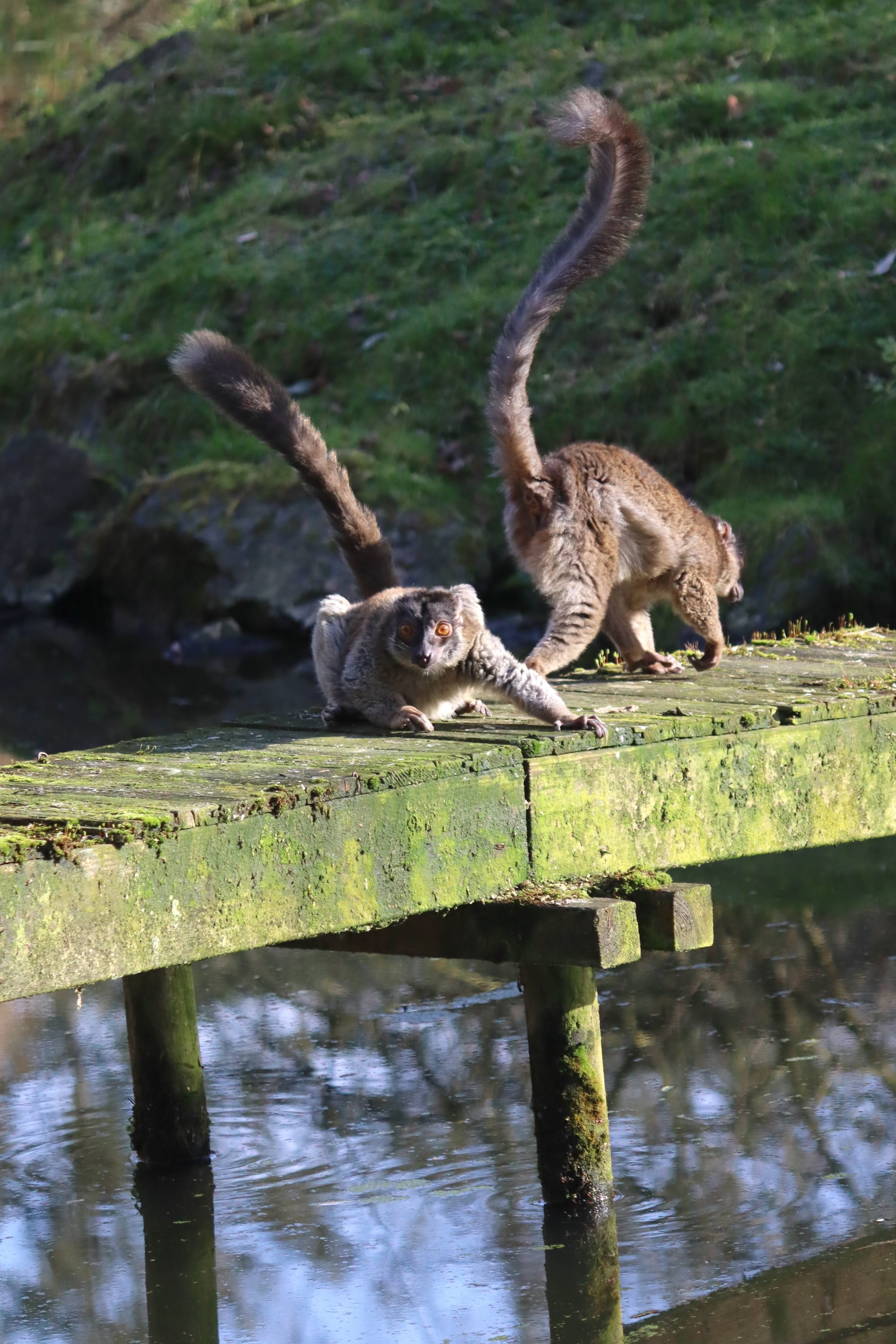
Common brown lemur (Eulemur fulvus) in Zooparc de Trégomeur, 2025

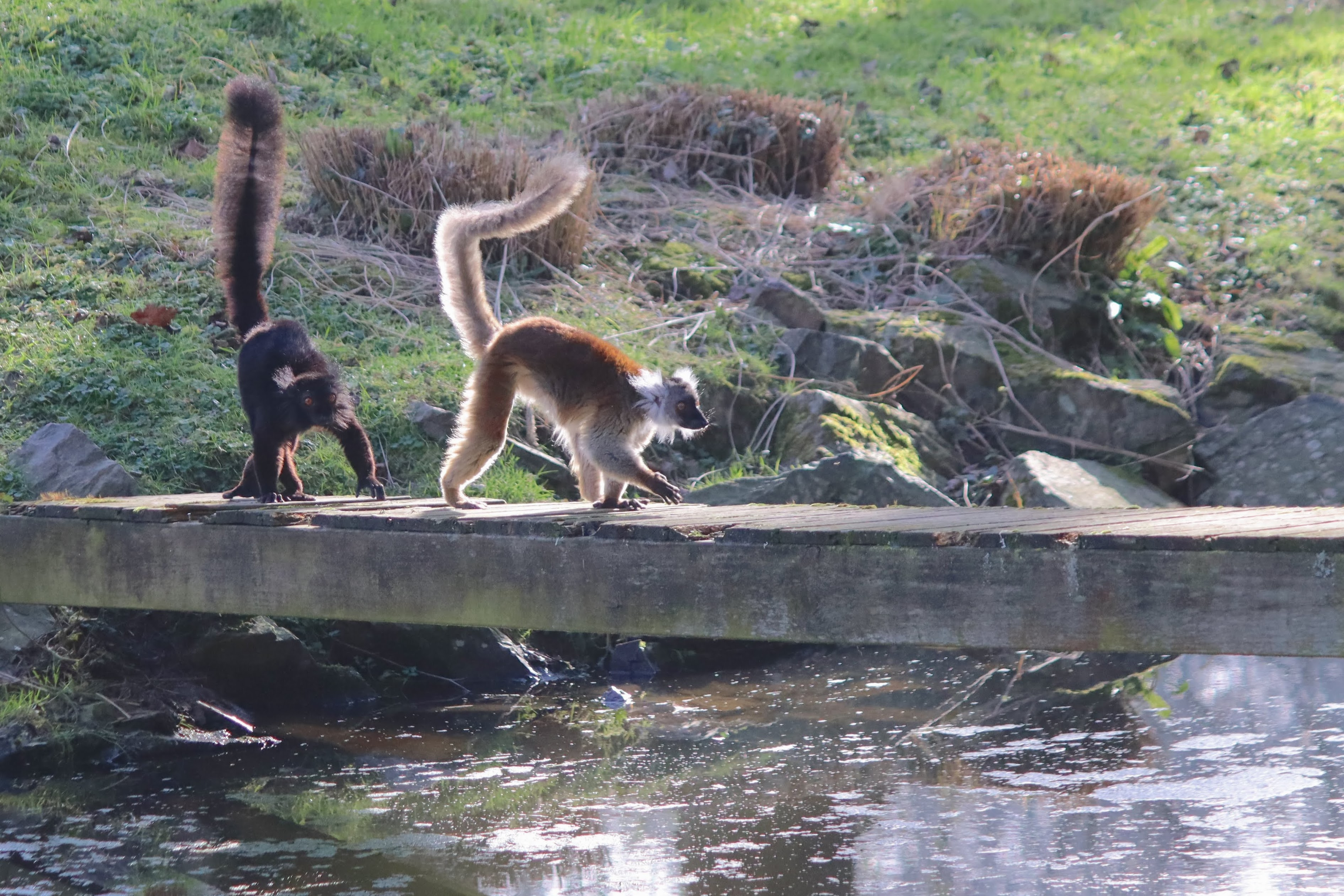
Black lemur (Eulemur macaco) in Zooparc de Trégomeur, 2025

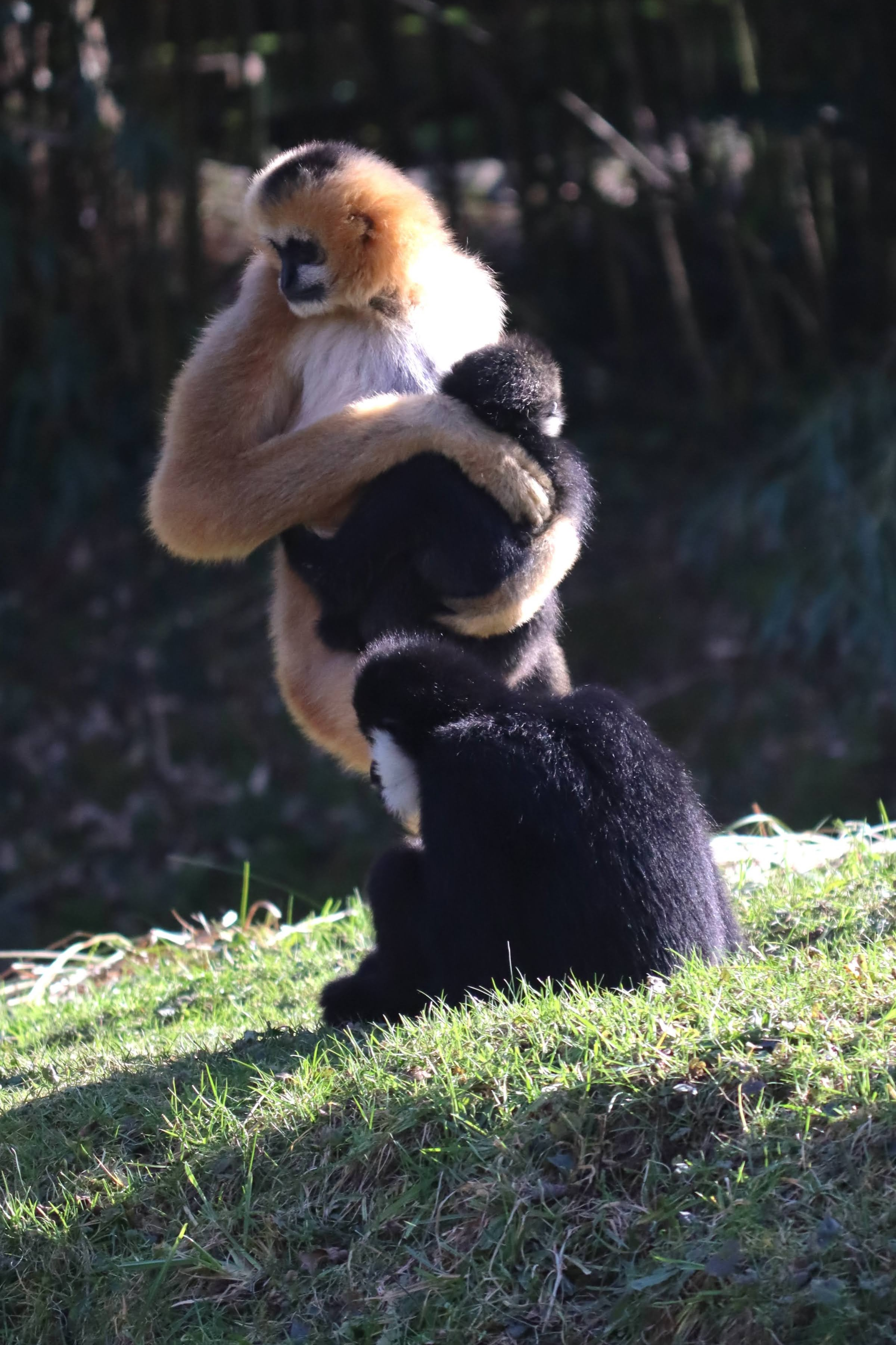
Northern white-cheeked gibbon (Nomascus leucogenys) in Zooparc de Trégomeur, 2025

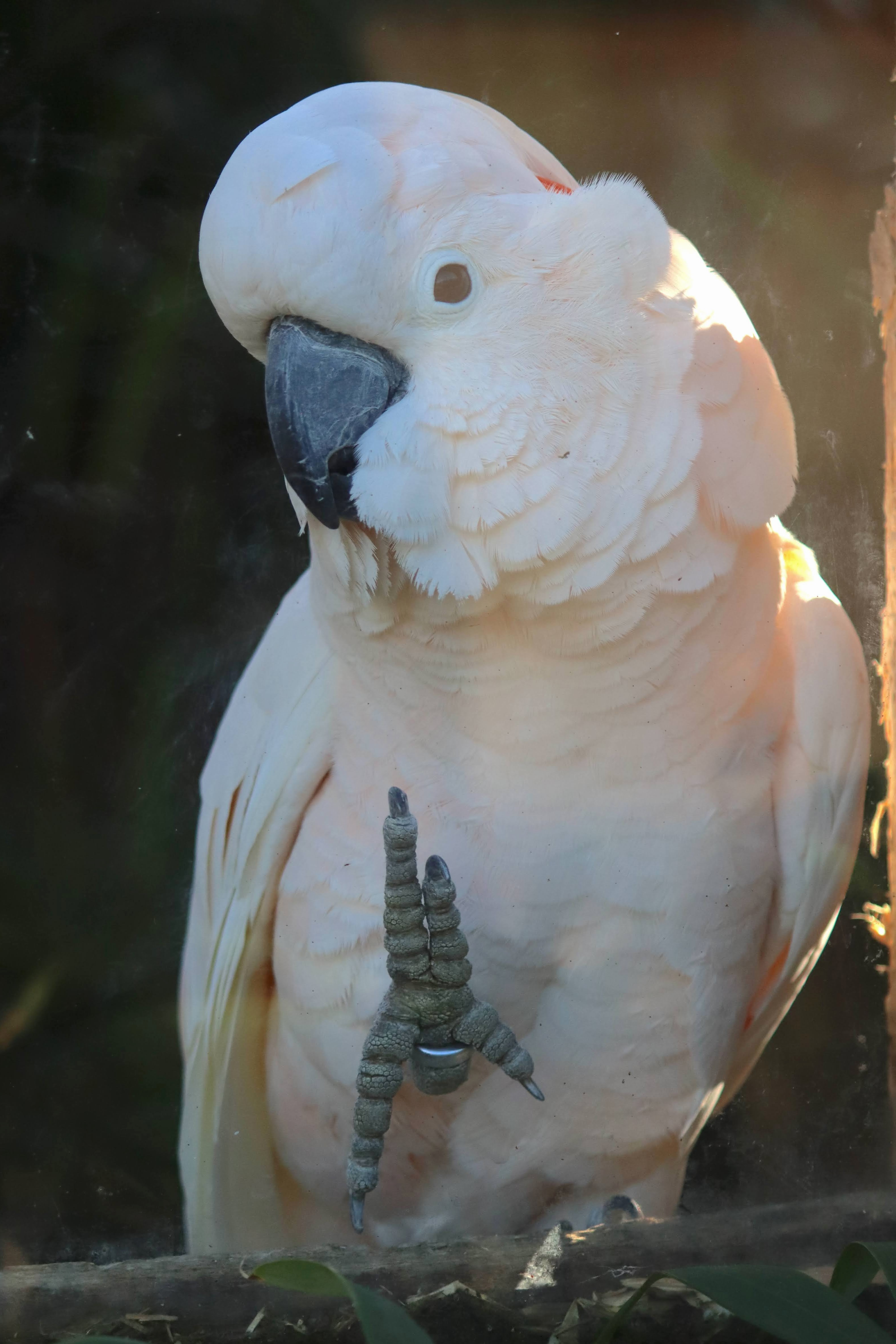
Salmon-crested cockatoo (Cacatua moluccensis) in Zooparc de Trégomeur, 2025

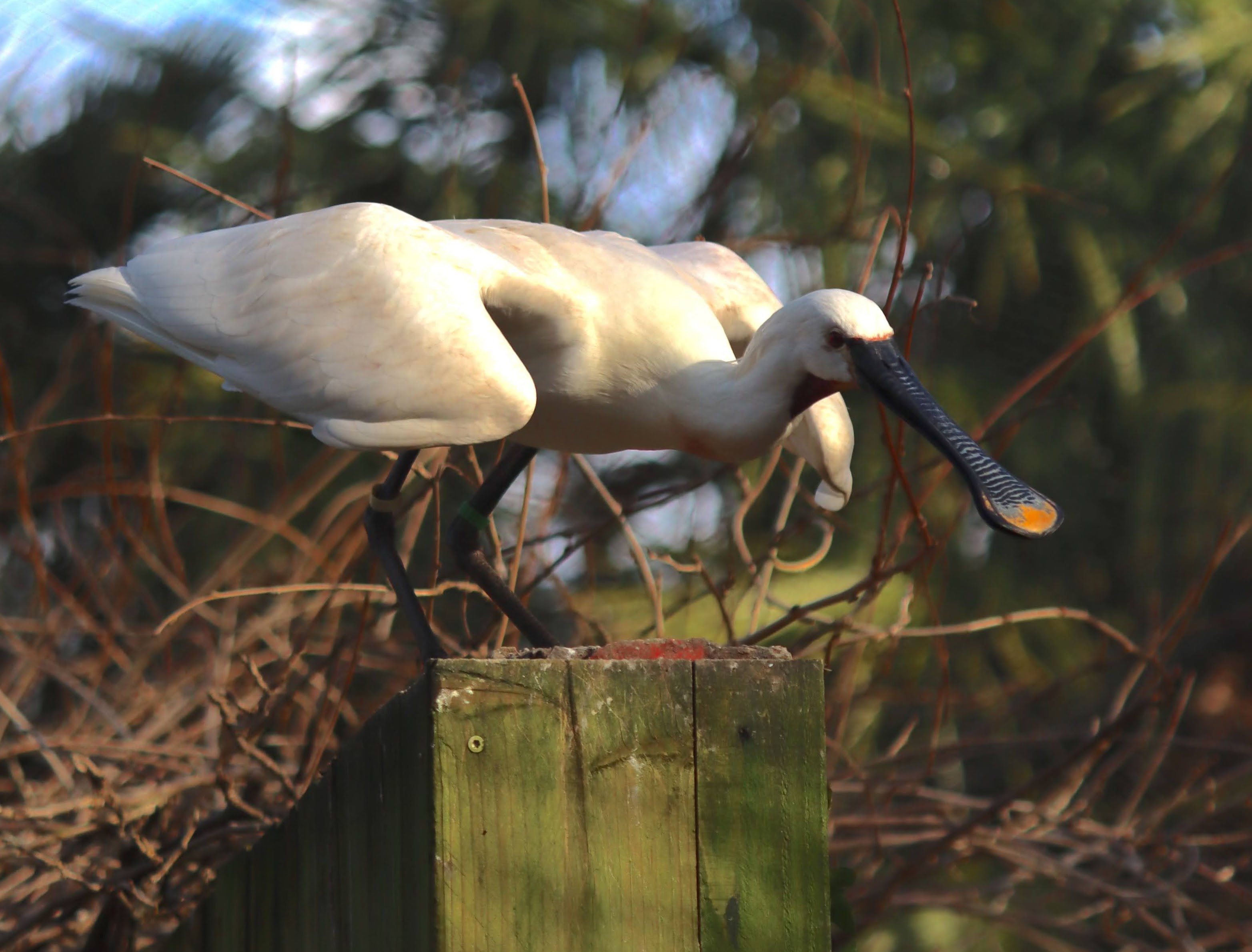
Eurasian spoonbill (Platalea leucorodia) in Zooparc de Trégomeur, 2025

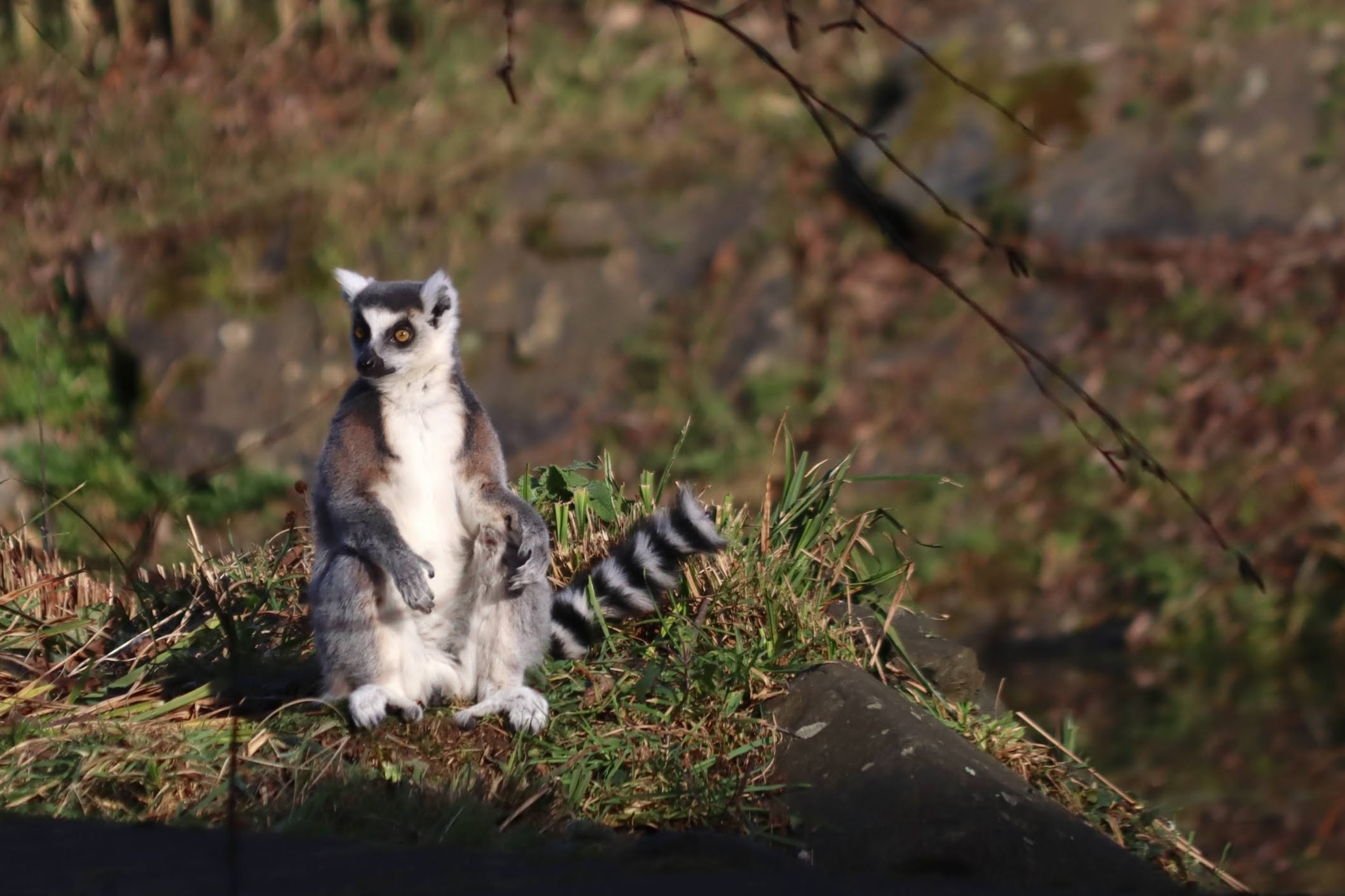
Ring-tailed lemur (Lemur catta) in Zooparc de Trégomeur, 2025

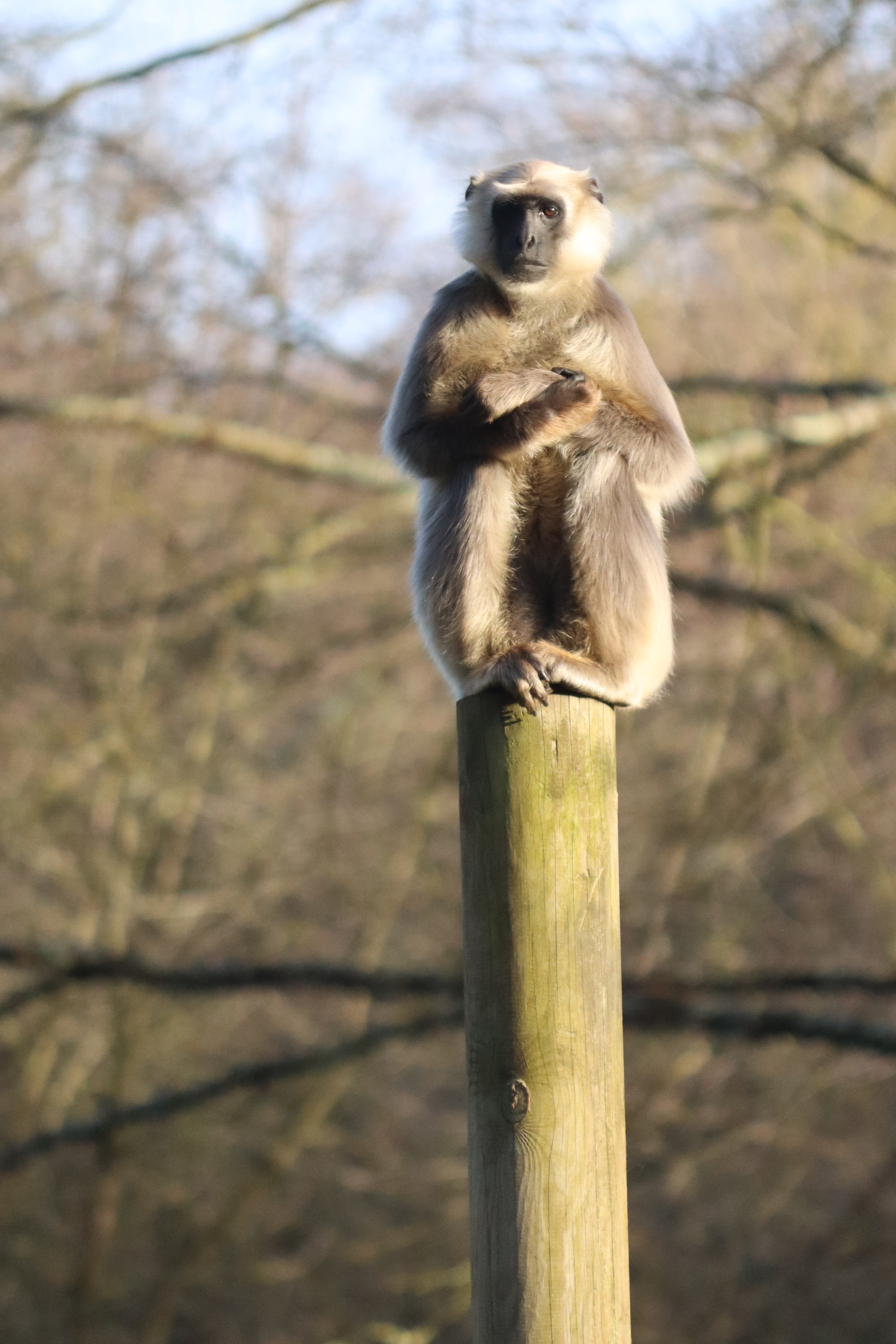
Northern plains gray langur (Semnopithecus entellus) in Zooparc de Trégomeur, 2025

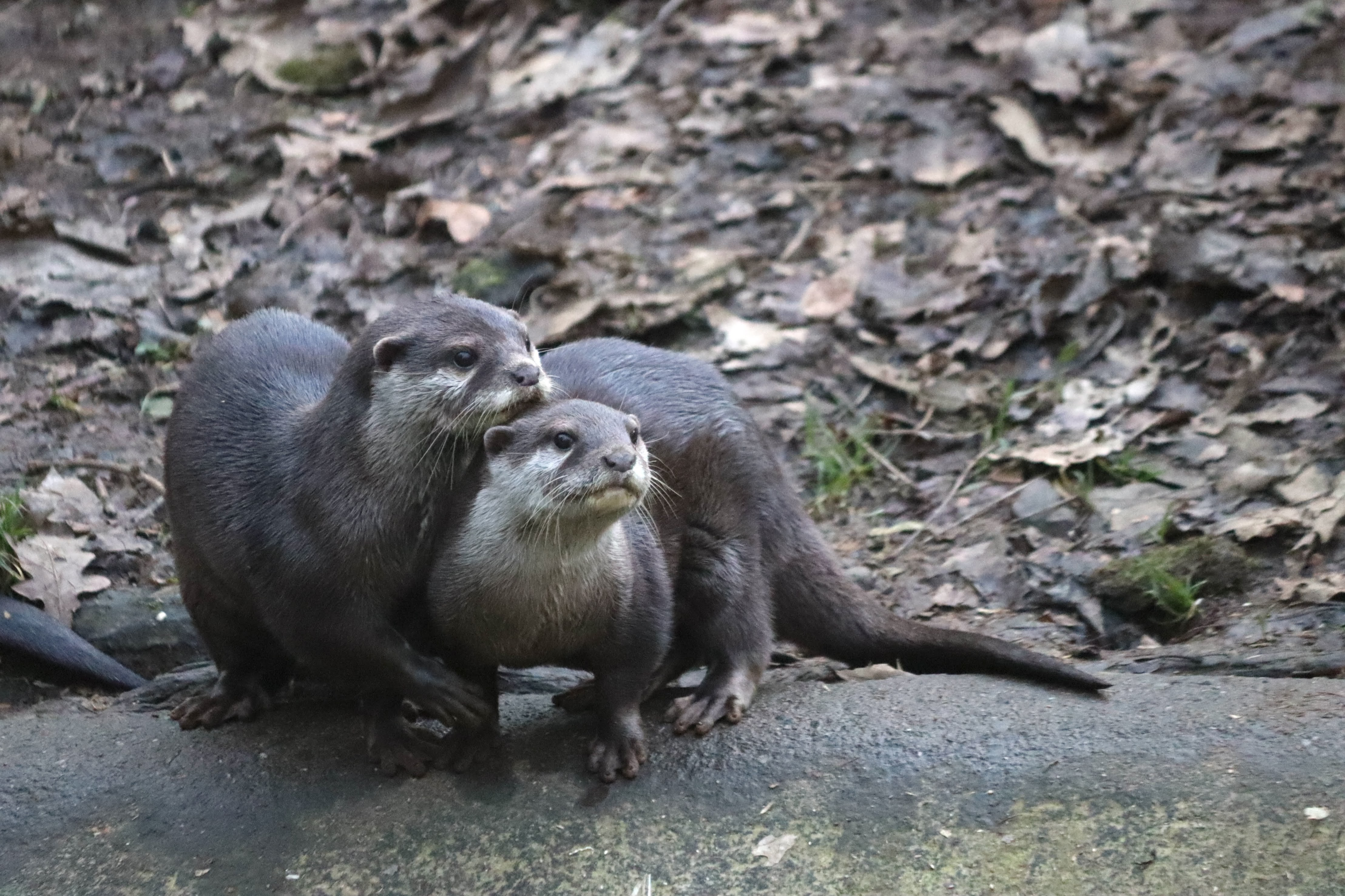
Asian small-clawed otter (Aonyx cinereus) in Zooparc de Trégomeur, 2025

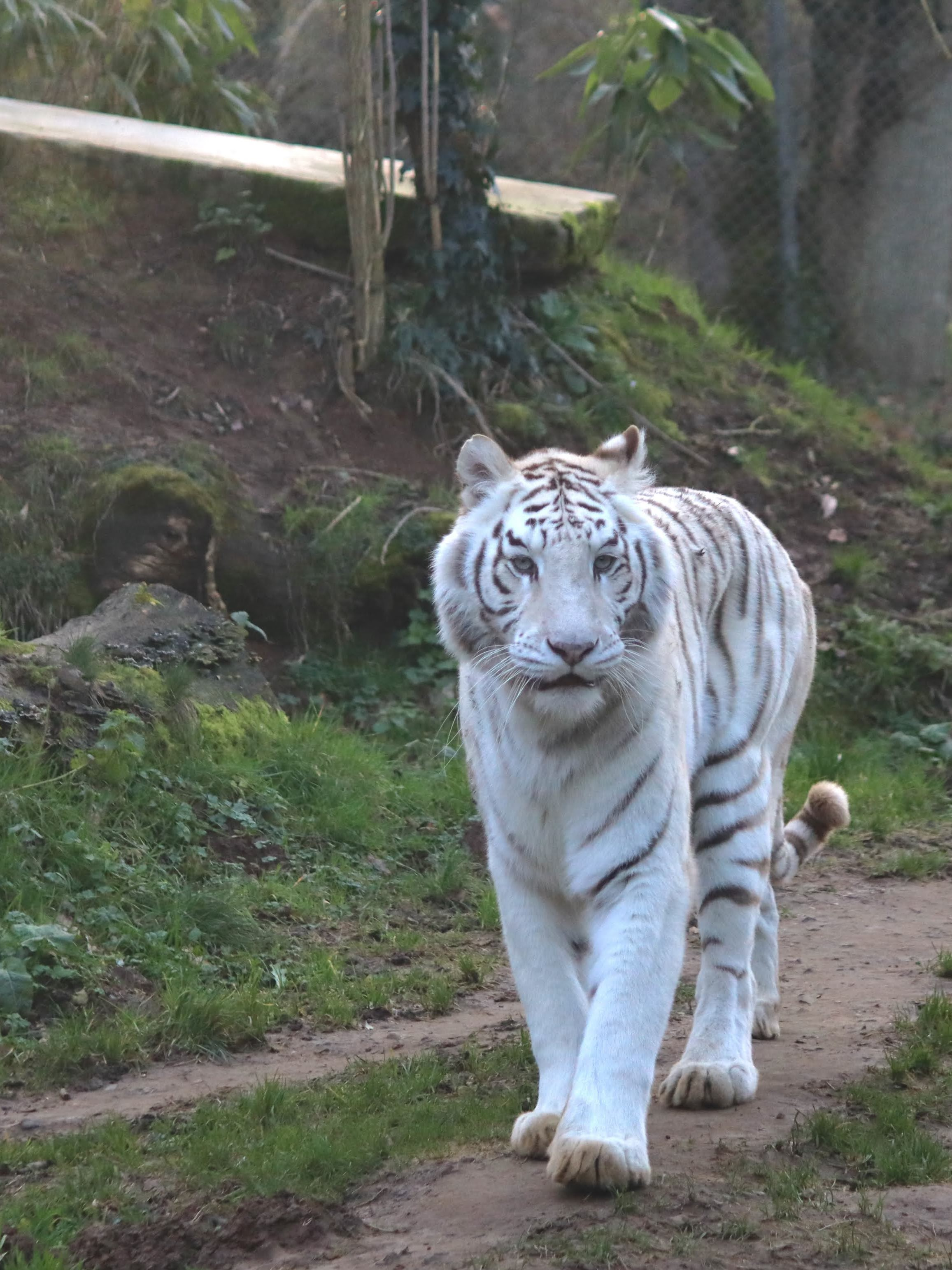
Leucistic tiger (Panthera tigris) in Zooparc de Trégomeur, 2025

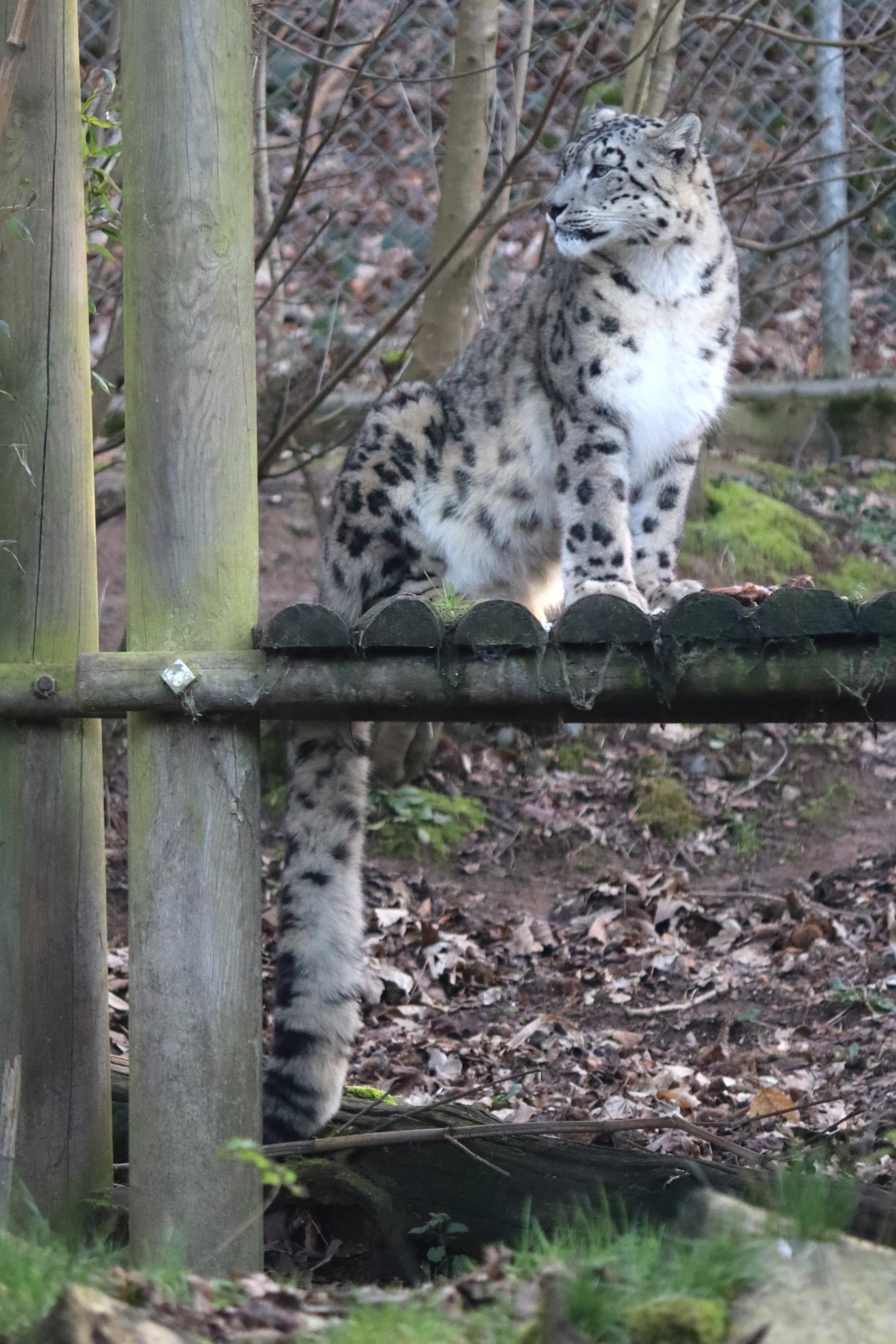
Snow leopard (Panthera uncia) in Zooparc de Trégomeur, 2025

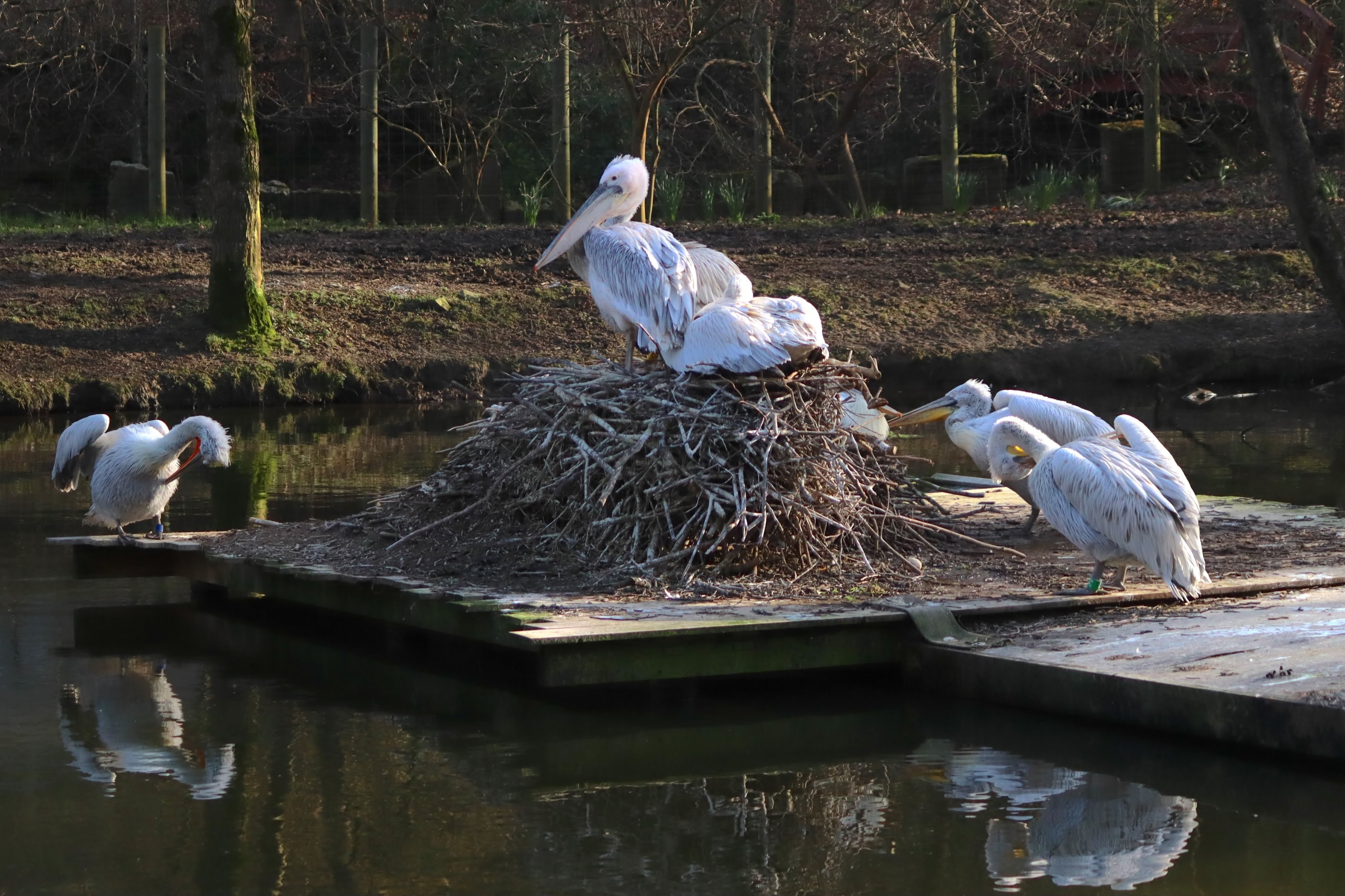
Dalmatian pelican (Pelecanus crispus) in Zooparc de Trégomeur, 2025

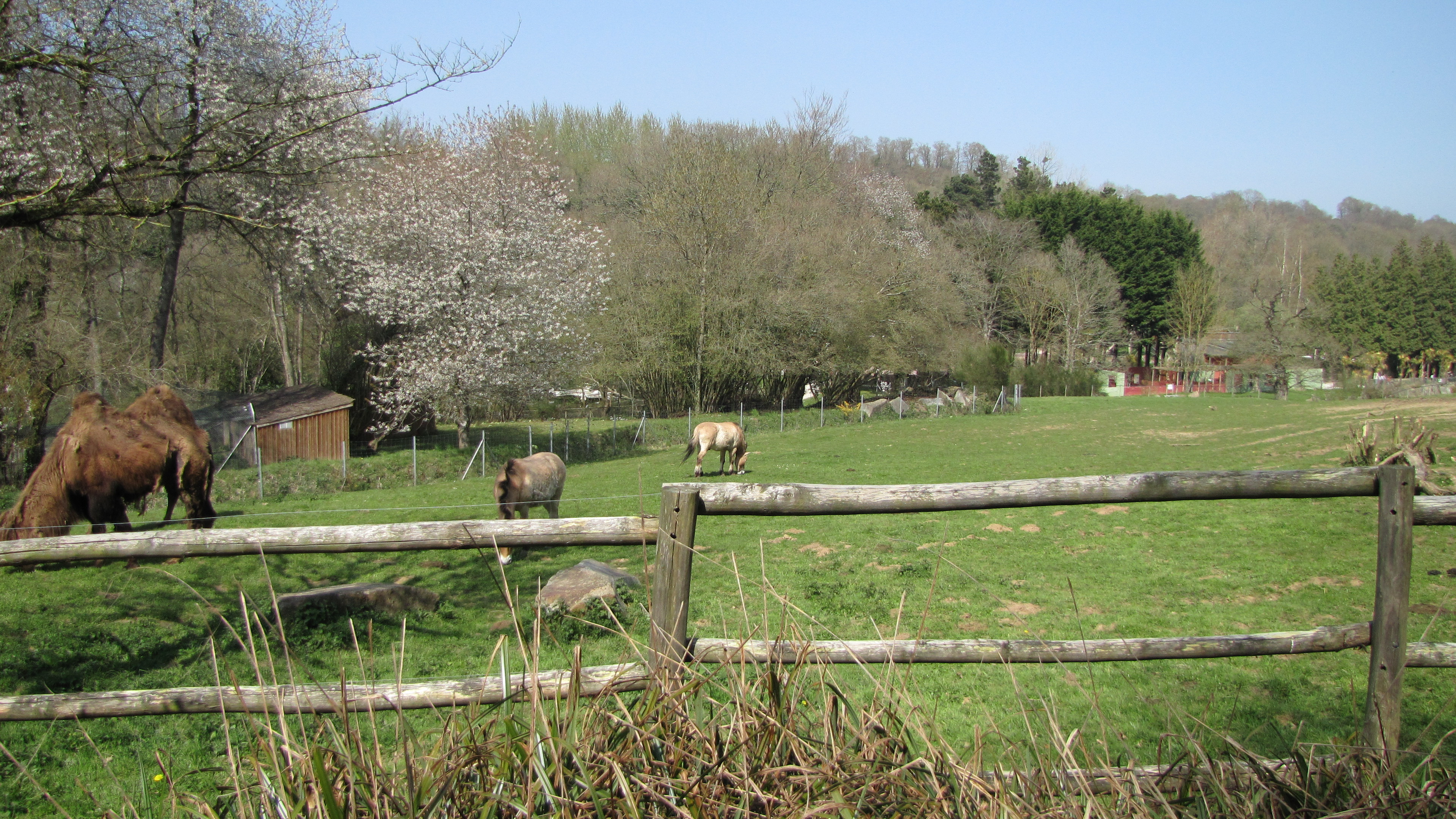
Przewalski's horses (Equus przewalskii) and Bactrian camel (Camelus bactrianus) in Zooparc de Trégomeur, 2010

== See also ==
- Zoo and Botanical Garden of Branféré
- Conservatoire botanique national de Brest
- Jardin Exotique de Roscoff
