= Jardin Exotique de Roscoff =

Botanical garden in Roscoff, Finistère, Brittany, France

The Jardin Exotique de Roscoff (Breton: Liorzh Ezotek Roscoff) (1.6 hectares) is a botanical garden located in Roscoff, Finistère, in the region of Brittany, France. It is open daily; an admission fee is charged.

== History ==
The garden was begun in 1986 when the département of Finistère purchased the rocky outcrop Roc'h Hievec, and a group of amateurs interested in subtropical plants decided to create a garden on the spot.

== Plants ==
Today the garden contains about 3,350 plants from the Southern Hemisphere, including Australia and New Zealand, the Canary Islands, and South America. Collections include representatives of the genera Acacia, Agave, Aloe, Echium, Eucalyptus, Pelargonium, Geranium, Fuchsia, Passiflora, and Yucca, as well as various cacti and palms.

== Gallery ==
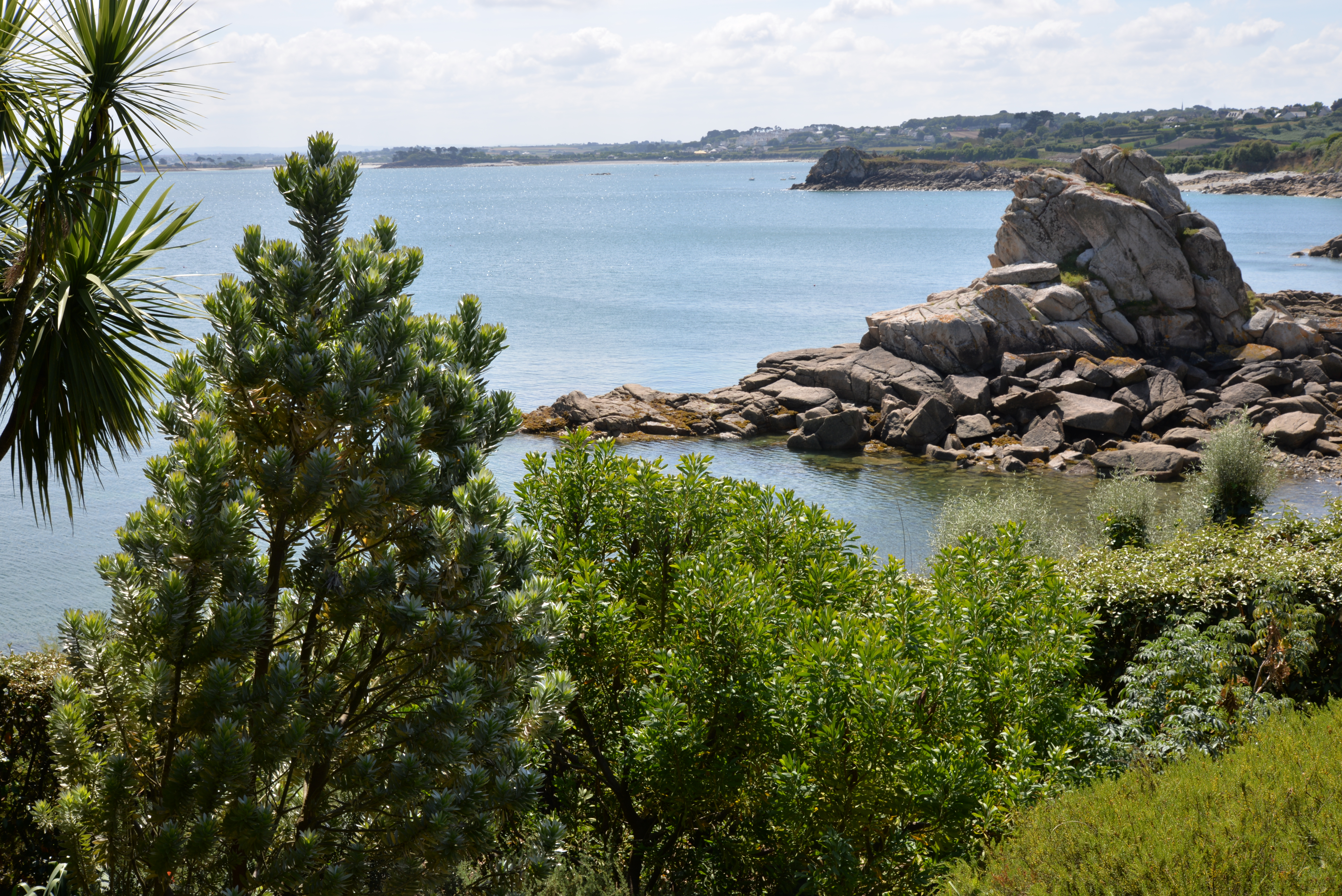

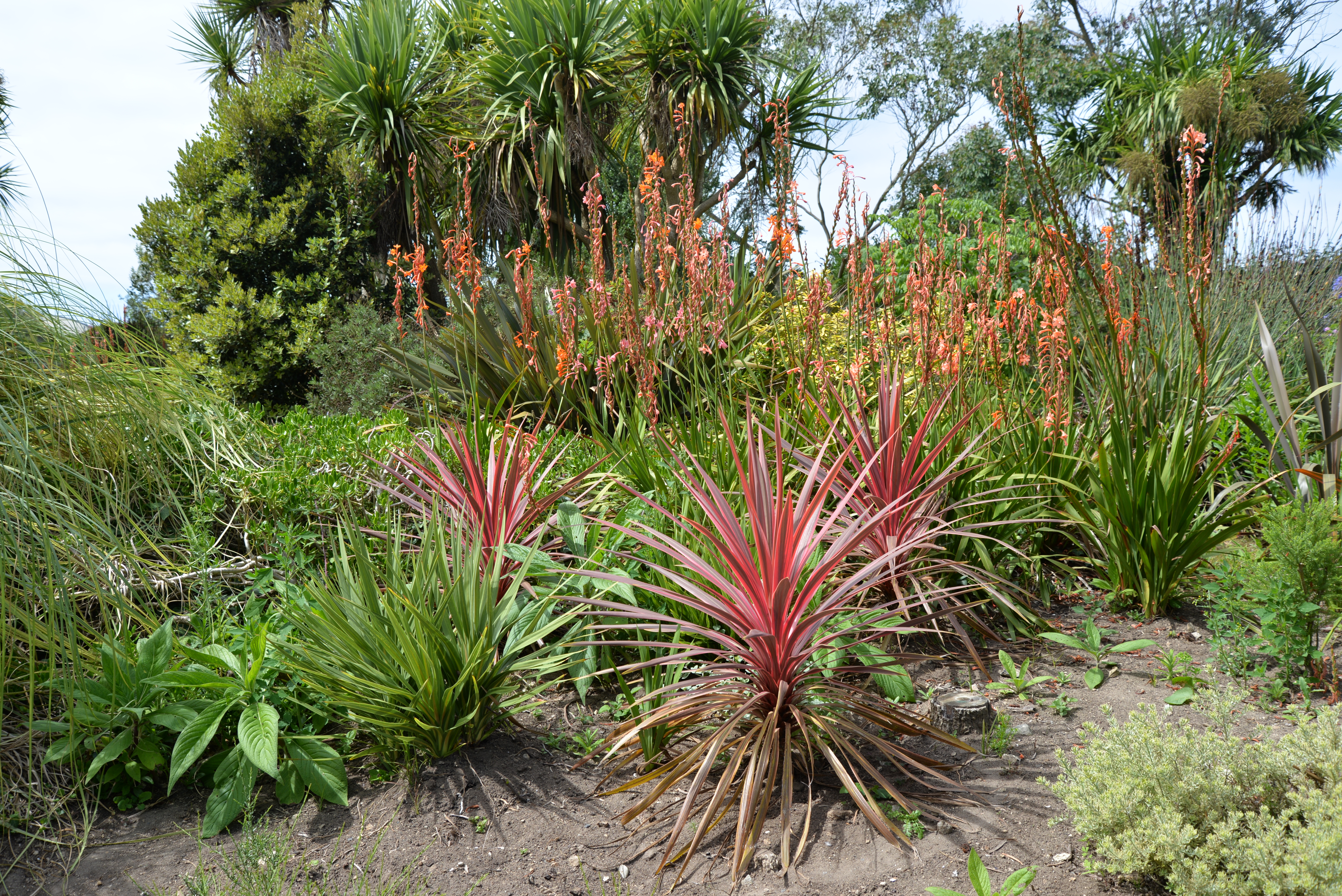

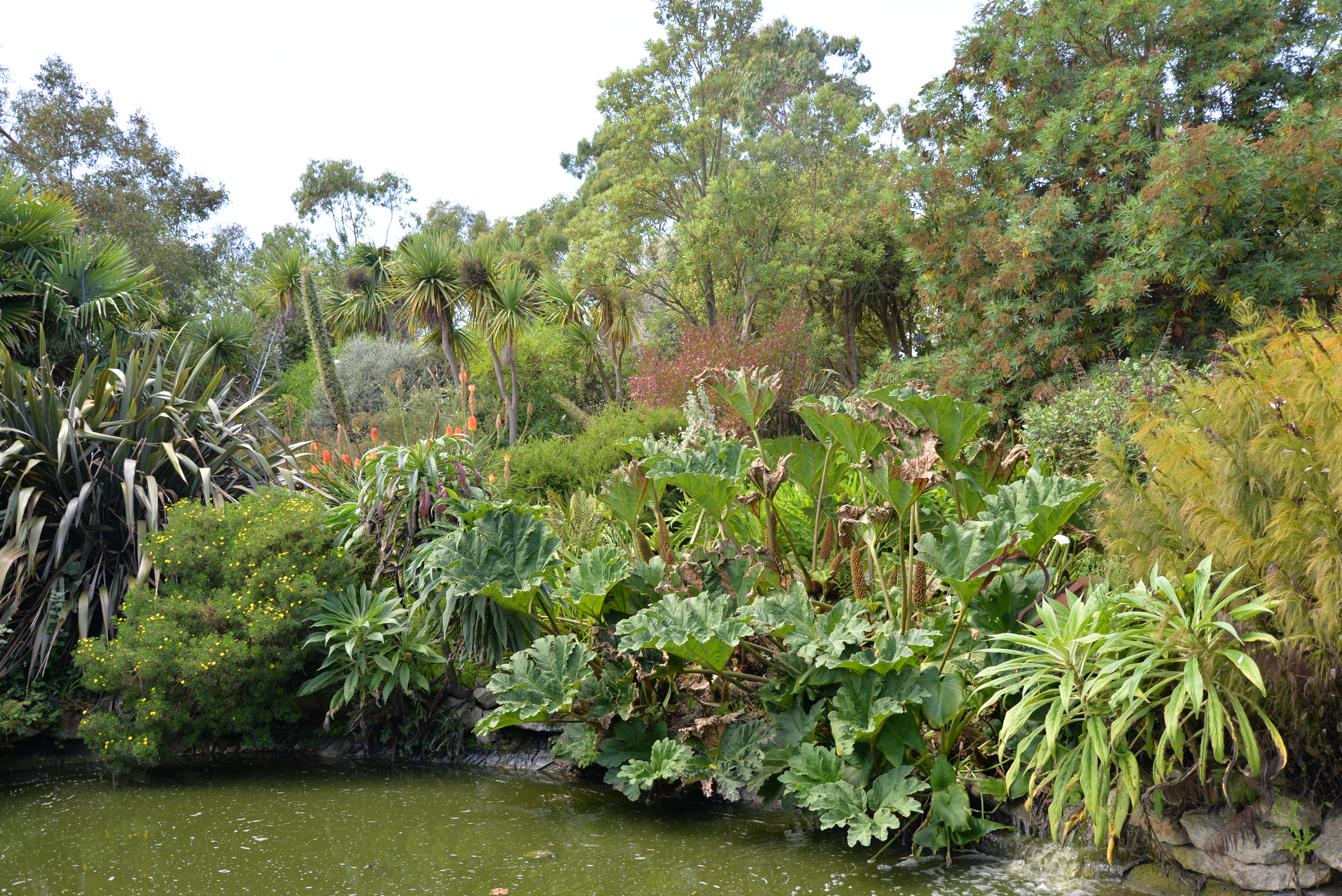

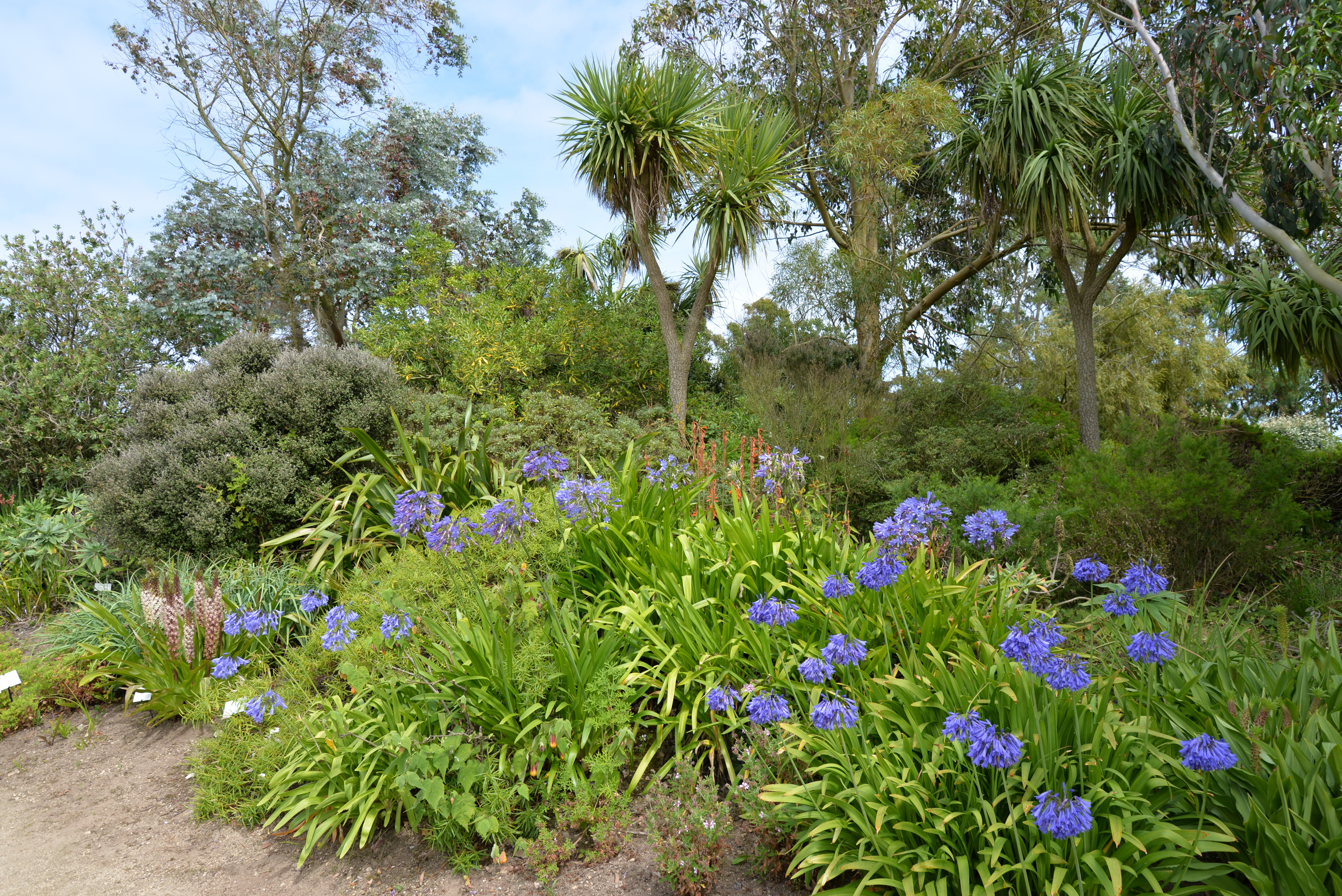

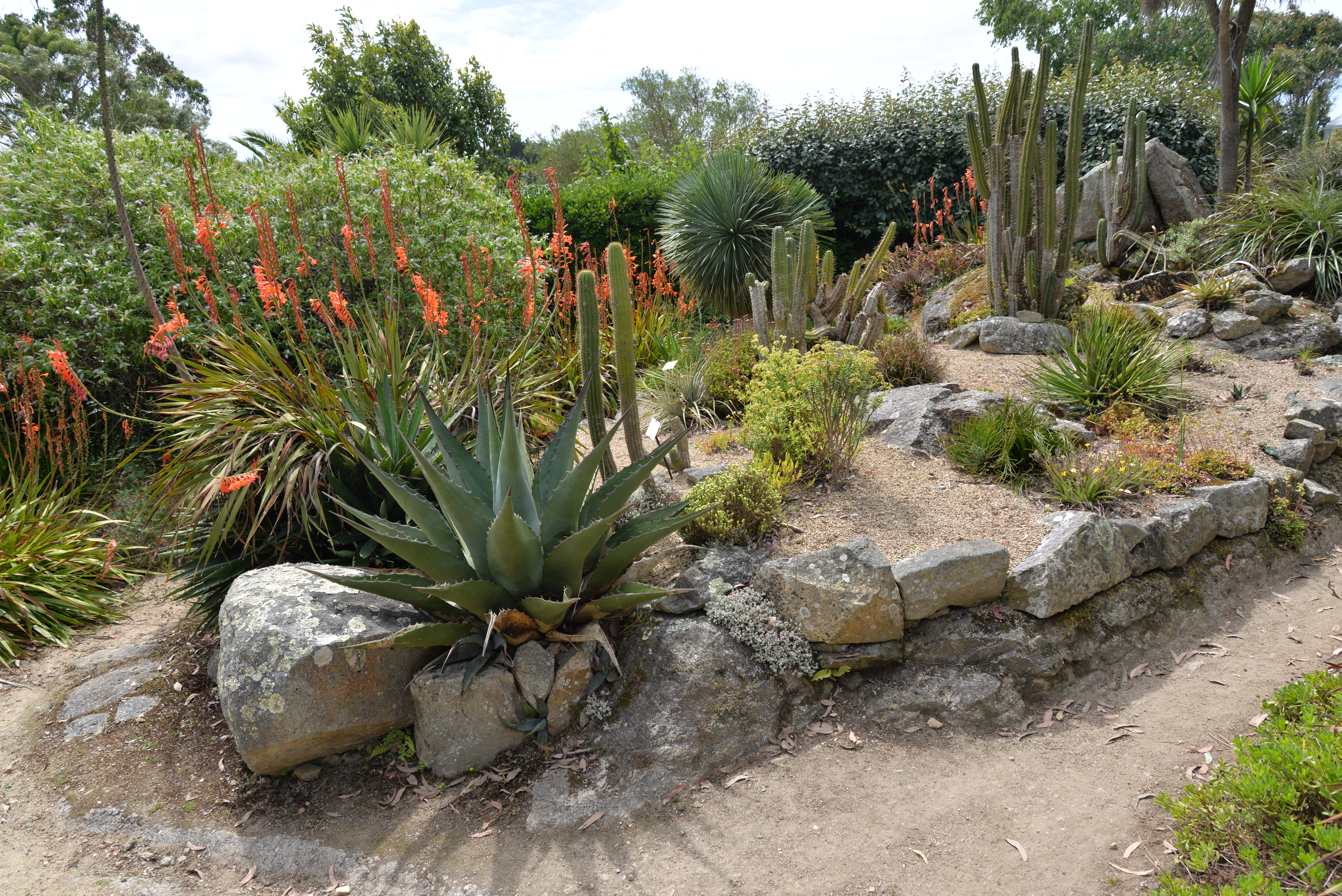

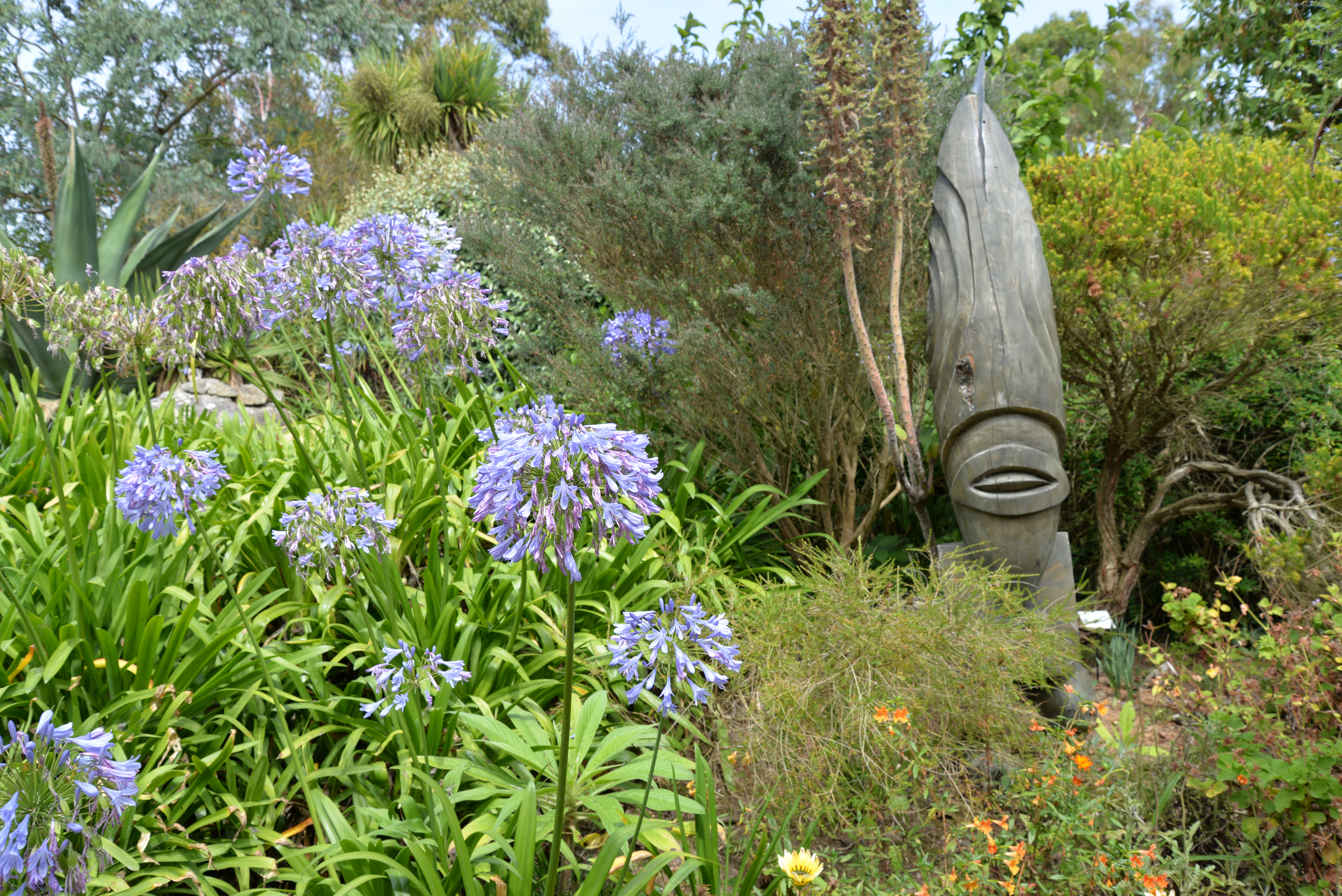

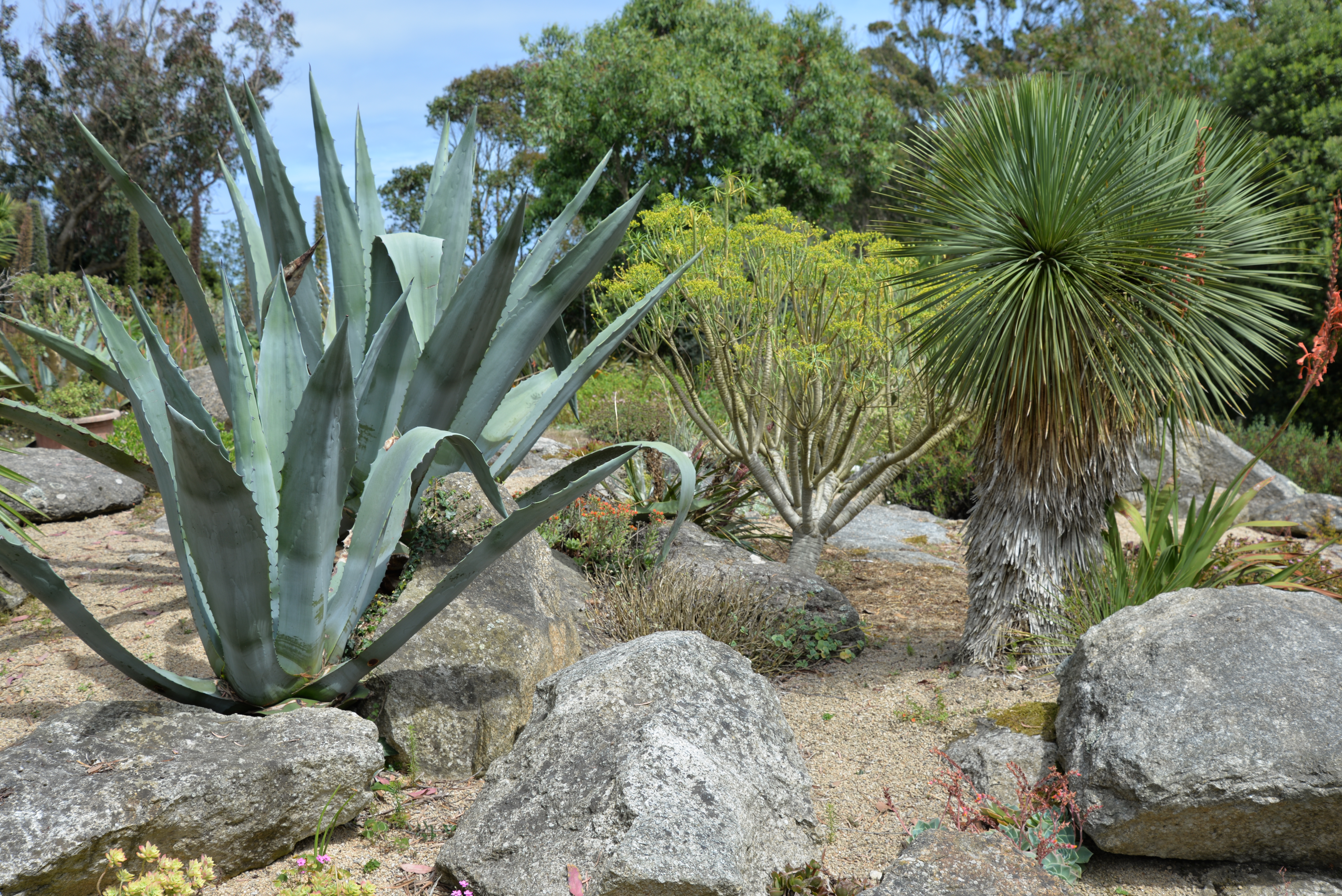

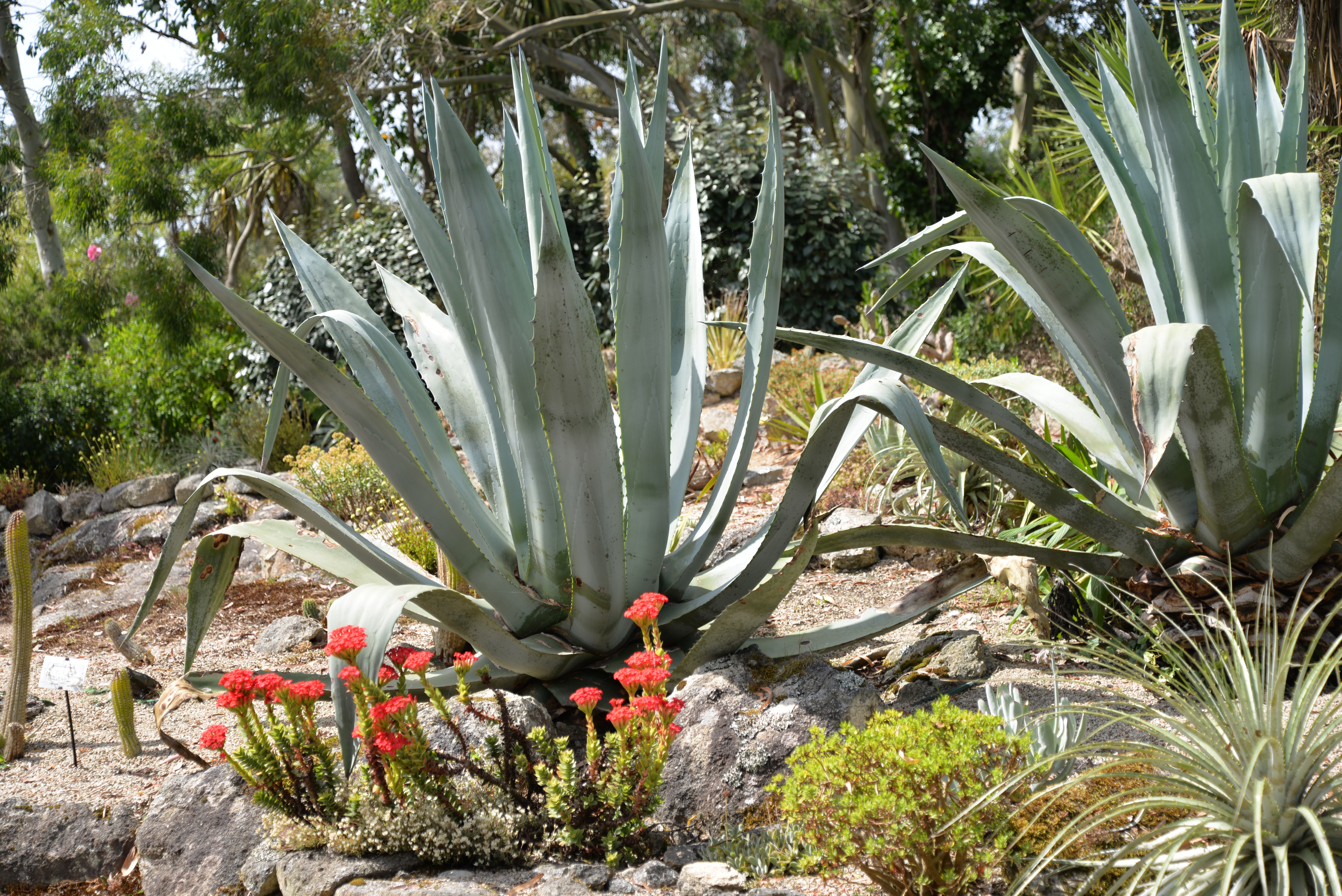

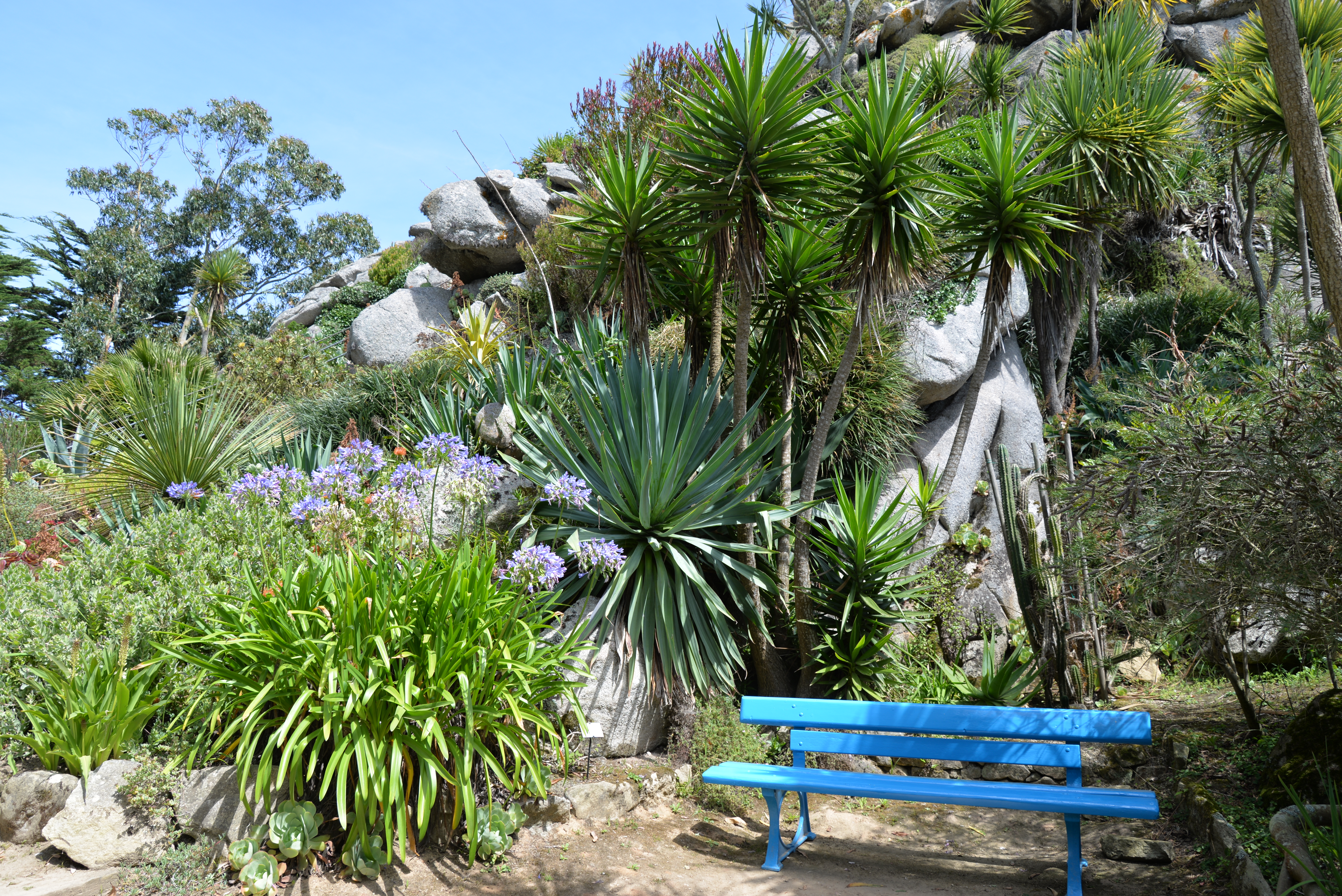

== See also ==
- List of botanical gardens in France
- Conservatoire botanique national de Brest
- Zoo and Botanical Garden of Branféré
- Zooparc de Trégomeur

== Links ==
- Jardin Exotique de Roscoff
- 1001 Fleurs entry (French)
- Conservatoire des Jardins et Paysages entry (French)
- Association des Parcs et Jardins de Bretagn entry (French)
- Gralon.net entry (French)
