= Zoo and Botanical Garden of Branféré =

- Interactive map of Zoo and Botanical Garden of Branféré
- 47.5943275°N 2.39856°W
- Date opened: 1965
- Location: Le Guerno, Morbihan, Brittany, France
- Land area: 45 hectares (110 acres)
- No. of animals: 1500
- No. of species: 150
- Memberships: EAZA
- Website: branfere.com

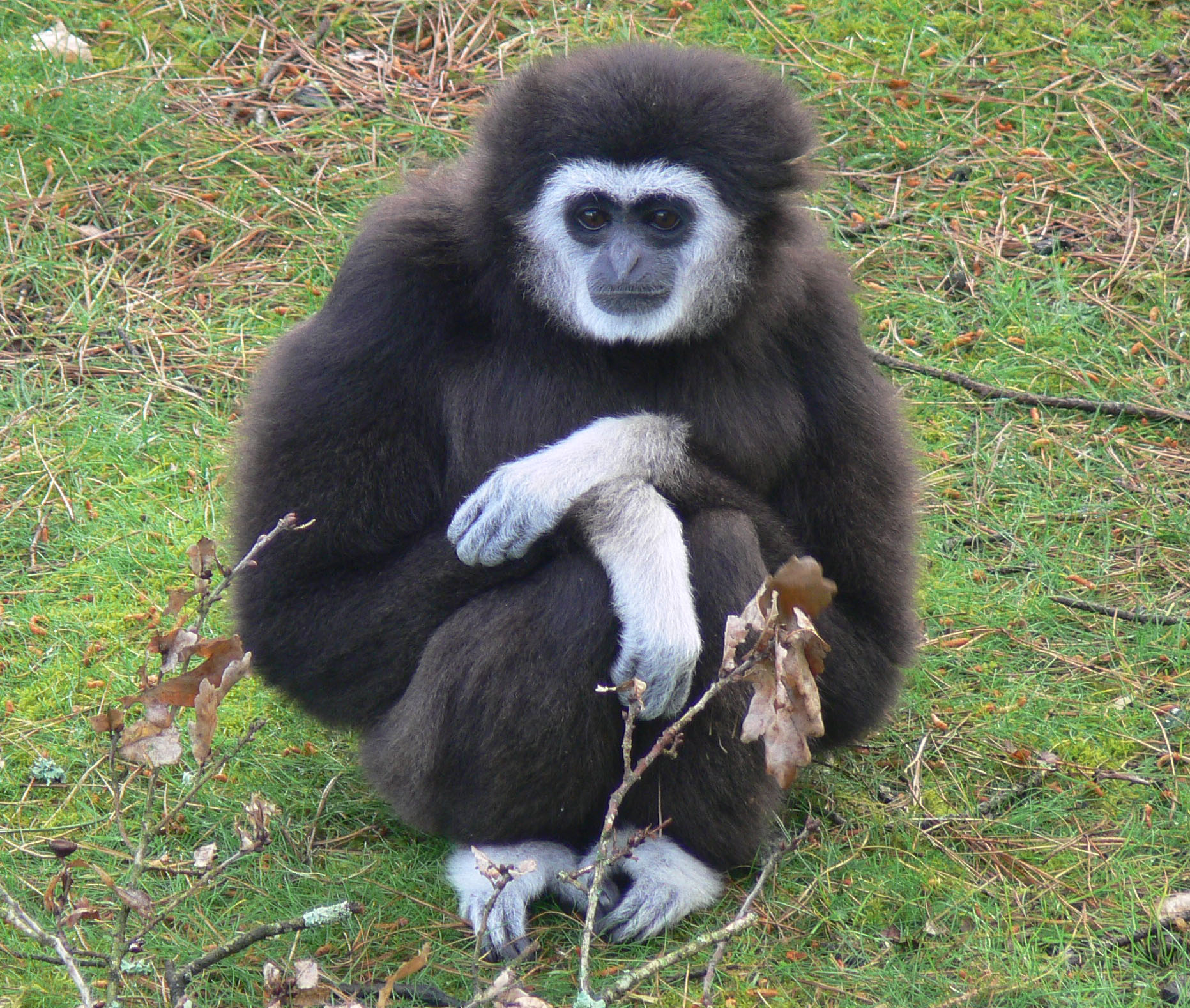
Hylobates lar in the Parc animalier et botanique de Branféré

The Zoo and Botanical Garden of Branféré (French: Parc animalier et botanique de Branféré) is a 35-hectare (86-acre) zoo and botanical garden located in Le Guerno, Morbihan, Brittany, France.

The park is open daily except in winter, and an admission fee is charged. Visitors can see the animals roaming freely in a centuries-old botanical garden.

== History ==
From 1662 until 1988, the garden was a private estate, with a château built in 1848 by the family of Freslon Freslonnière. It was acquired in 1884 by Casimir Jourde, whose grandson Paul became a wildlife painter and world traveler. In the 1930s Paul and his wife, Hélène Castori, having discovered a game reserve maintained by Khengarji III, Maharao of Kutch, decided to create an "animal paradise" at Branféré by letting exotic animals from around the world acclimatize to the property and roam free, creating a park where animals and humans could interact. In 1965 the park opened to the public after thirty years of development, and in 1988 it was bequeathed to the Fondation de France.

== Animals ==
Today the park contains almost 1,000 animals representing nearly 150 species, including antelope, gibbons, hippopotamus, lemurs, llamas, prairie dogs, tapirs, wallaby, zebras, and yaks, as well as flamingos, parrots, pelicans, and storks, all set within landscapes of prairies, waterfalls, and small islands. Its grounds have displayed botanical plantings since the 18th century, and today contain about 70 species of trees and shrubs including araucaria, azaleas, camellias, laricio pines, rhododendrons, sequoia, and a 300-year-old weeping specimen listed as one of the remarkable trees in France.

== Education ==
The Fondation de France, in collaboration with the Fondation Nicolas Hulot pour la Nature et l'Homme and the commune of Muzillac have created the Nicolas Hulot School for Nature and Man, open since 2004 at Park Branféré.

== See also ==
- List of botanical gardens in France
- List of zoos in France
- Zooparc de Trégomeur
- Conservatoire botanique national de Brest
- Jardin Exotique de Roscoff
