= Conservatoire botanique national de Brest =

Botanical garden in Brest, France

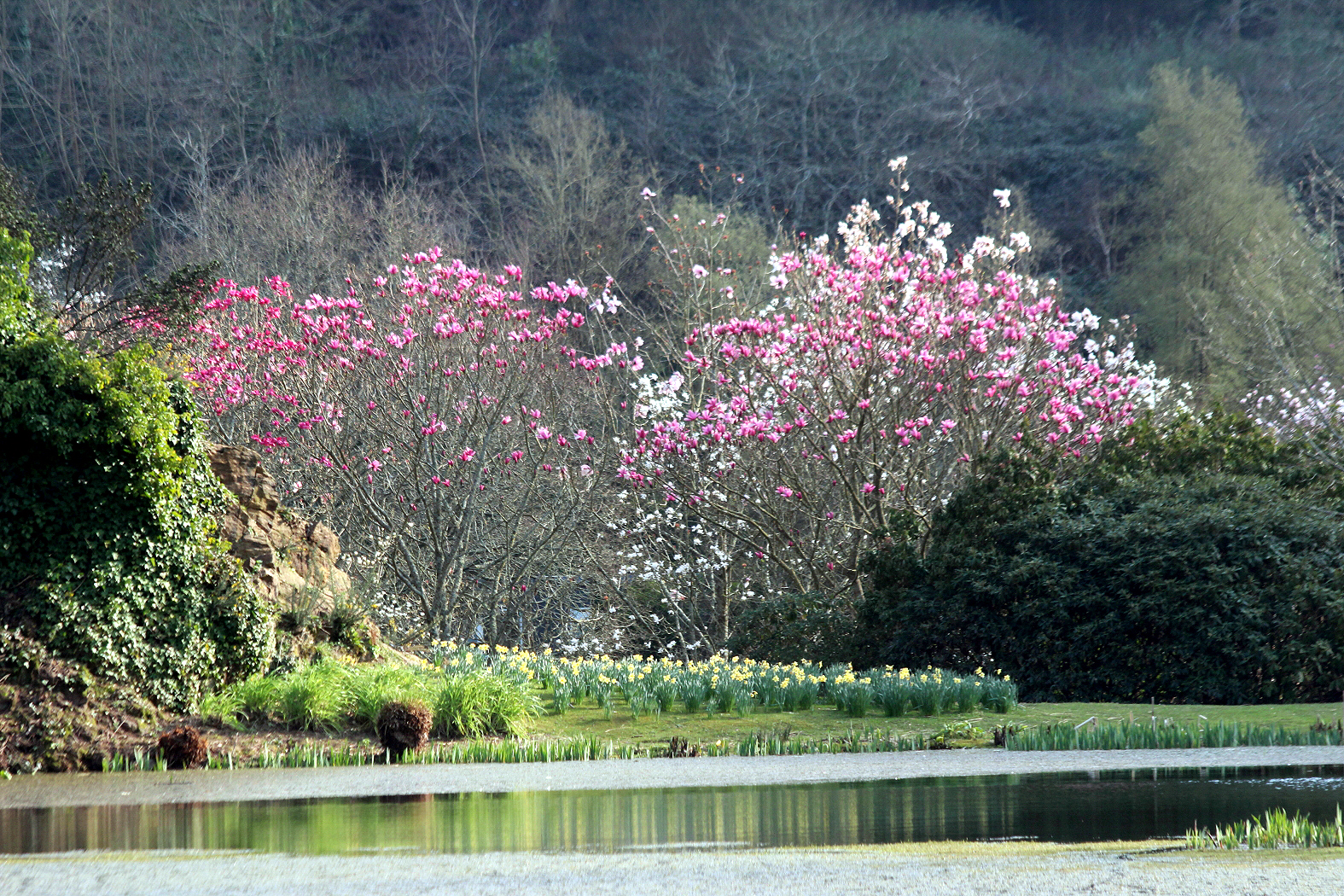
- Magnolia pond
- Interactive map of Conservatoire botanique national de Brest
- Location: 52 Allée du Bot, Brest, Finistère
- Coordinates: 48°24′10″N 4°26′54″W
- Area: 32 hectares (79 acres)
- Status: Open year round
- Website: cbnbrest.fr/

The Conservatoire botanique national de Brest (Breton: Mirva broadel louzawouriezh Brest) (32 hectares) is a notable botanical garden located at 52 Allée du Bot, Brest, Finistère, in the region of Brittany, France. It is open daily without charge.

== History ==
The conservatory site was formerly a quarry and rubbish dump, purchased in 1971 by the municipality to create open space. The conservatory itself was founded in 1975 with a primary mission of preserving endangered species from the Armorican Massif (including parts of Brittany, Basse-Normandie and Pays de la Loire), France, Europe, and islands around the world, but also including plants from China, Japan, the Americas, Australia, and New Zealand. Since 1990 it has been designated a National Botanical Conservation Center to protect endangered and protected plants of the Armorican Massif.

== Plants ==
Today the conservatory contains a remarkable collection of endangered plants, totaling about 1,700 species, of which 20 species have been preserved in large part by the conservatory's actions. These very rare plants include Brighamia insignis, Centaurium favargeri, Cheirolophus massonianus, Cylindrocline lorencei, Dombeya cacuminum, Hibiscus insularis, Hibiscus liliiflorus, Impatiens thomassetii, Limonium humile, Normania triphylla, Ruizia cordata, and Trochetia boutoniana.

Additional specimens of interest include Amorphophallus titanum, Asparagus fallax, Astrophytum myriostigma, Angraecum sesquipedale, Commelina rupicola, Geranium maderense, Hibiscus storckii (H. rosa-sinensis), Lavandula pinnata, Limonium dendroides, Monizia edulis, Pachypodium rosulatum, Pelargonium cotyledonis, Tolpis glabrescens, Tournefortia bojeri, and Turbina inopinata.

== Greenhouses ==
The conservatory includes greenhouses (1,000 m^{2} total area), containing over 200 taxa of which 95% are endangered, which are subdivided into four sections: tropical mountains, dry tropics, humid tropical forests, and subtropical ocean islands. It also contains a herbarium (about 5,000 specimens) and cold storage rooms for packs of seeds. The greenhouses are open to the public during certain parts of the year and, unlike for the open-air garden, an admission fee is charged.

== Gallery ==
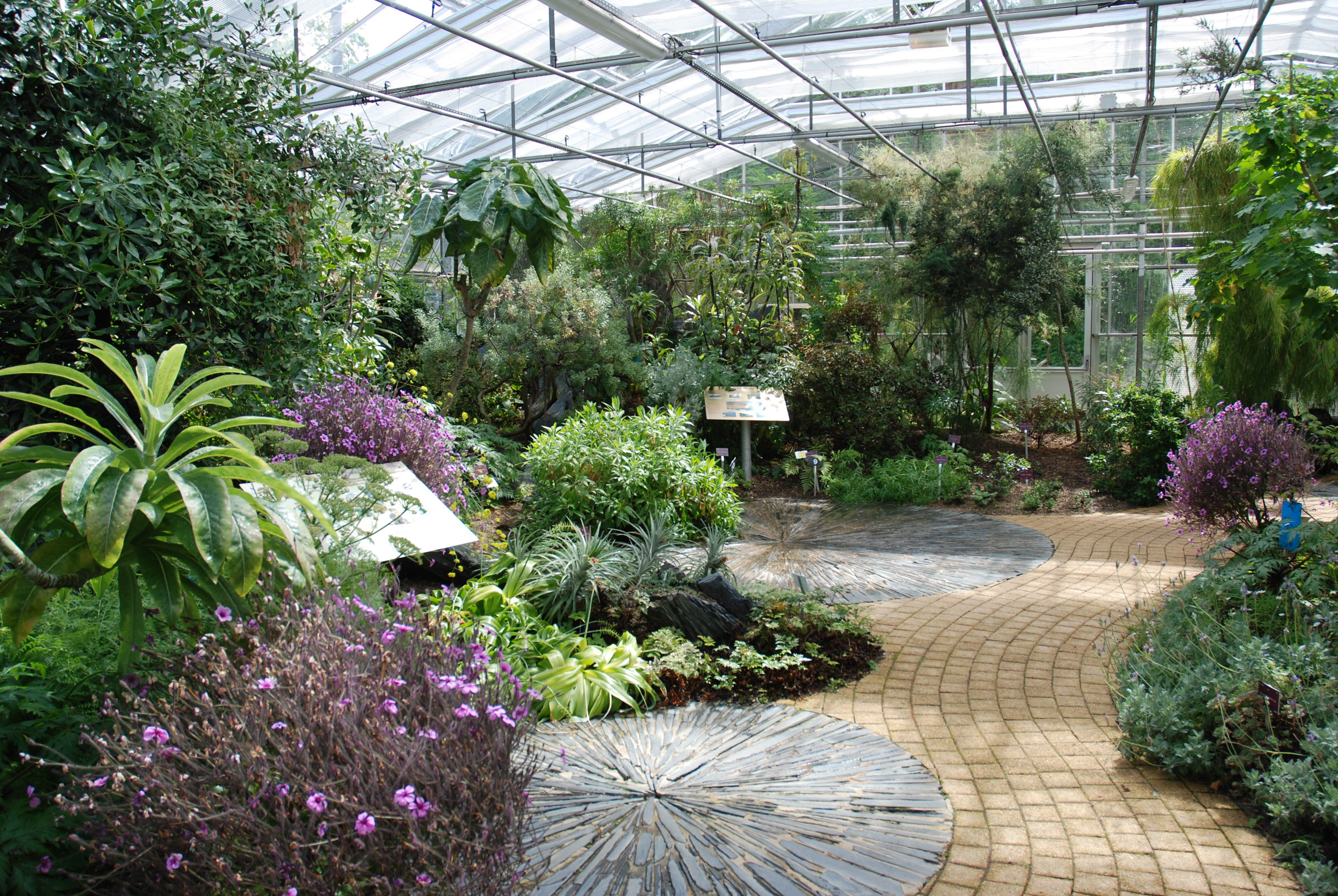
Interior of the greenhouse

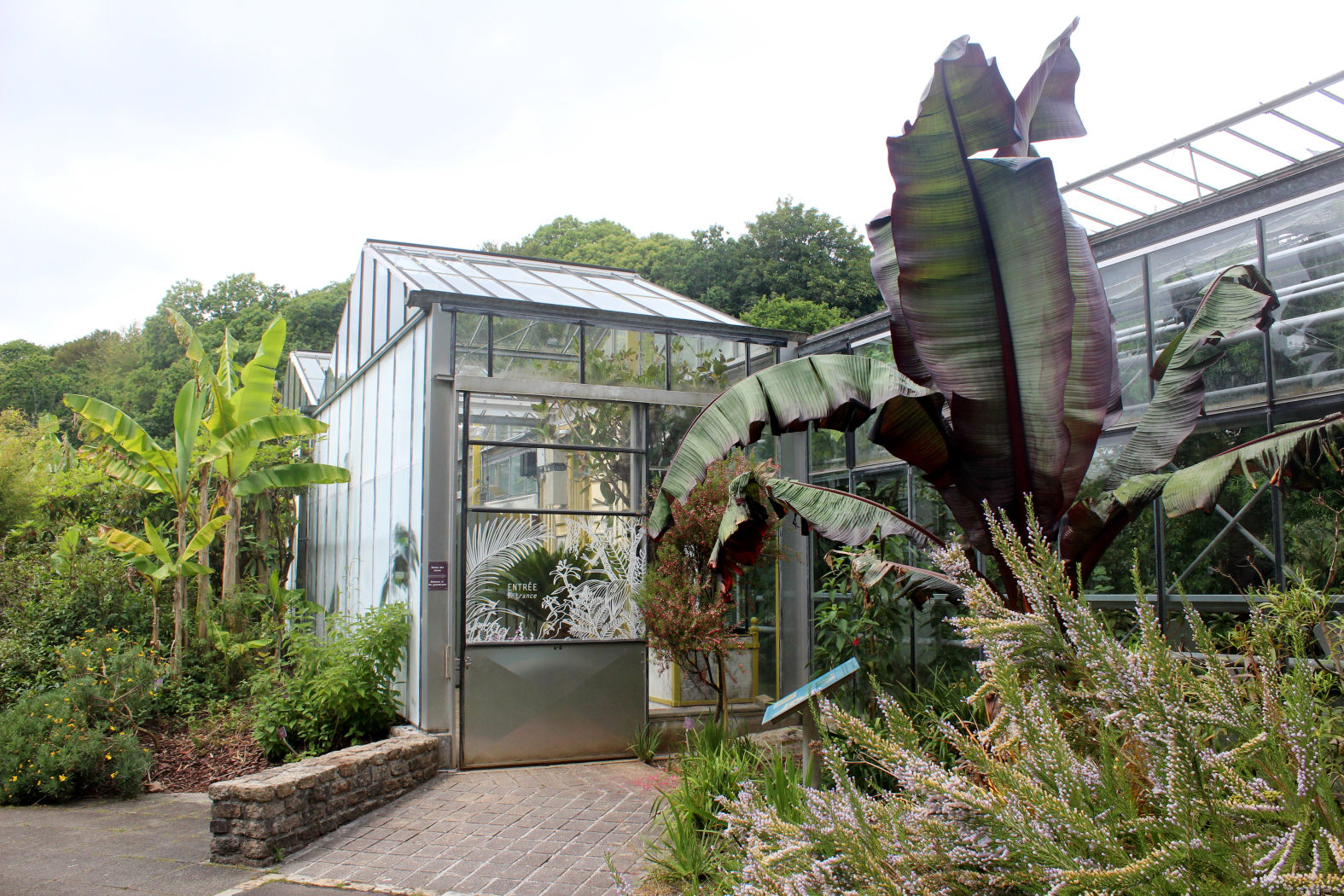
Exterior of the greenhouse

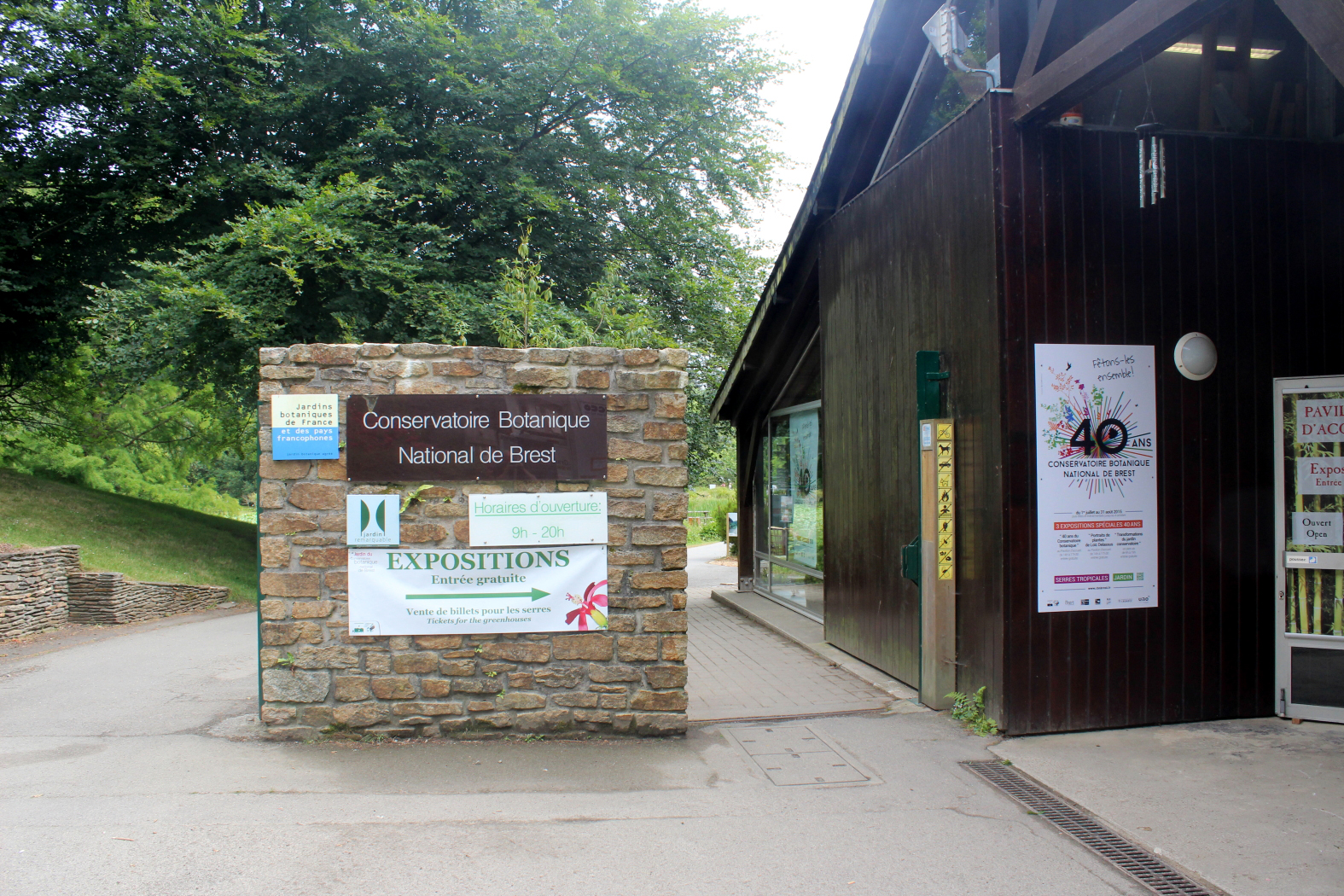
Entrance to the garden

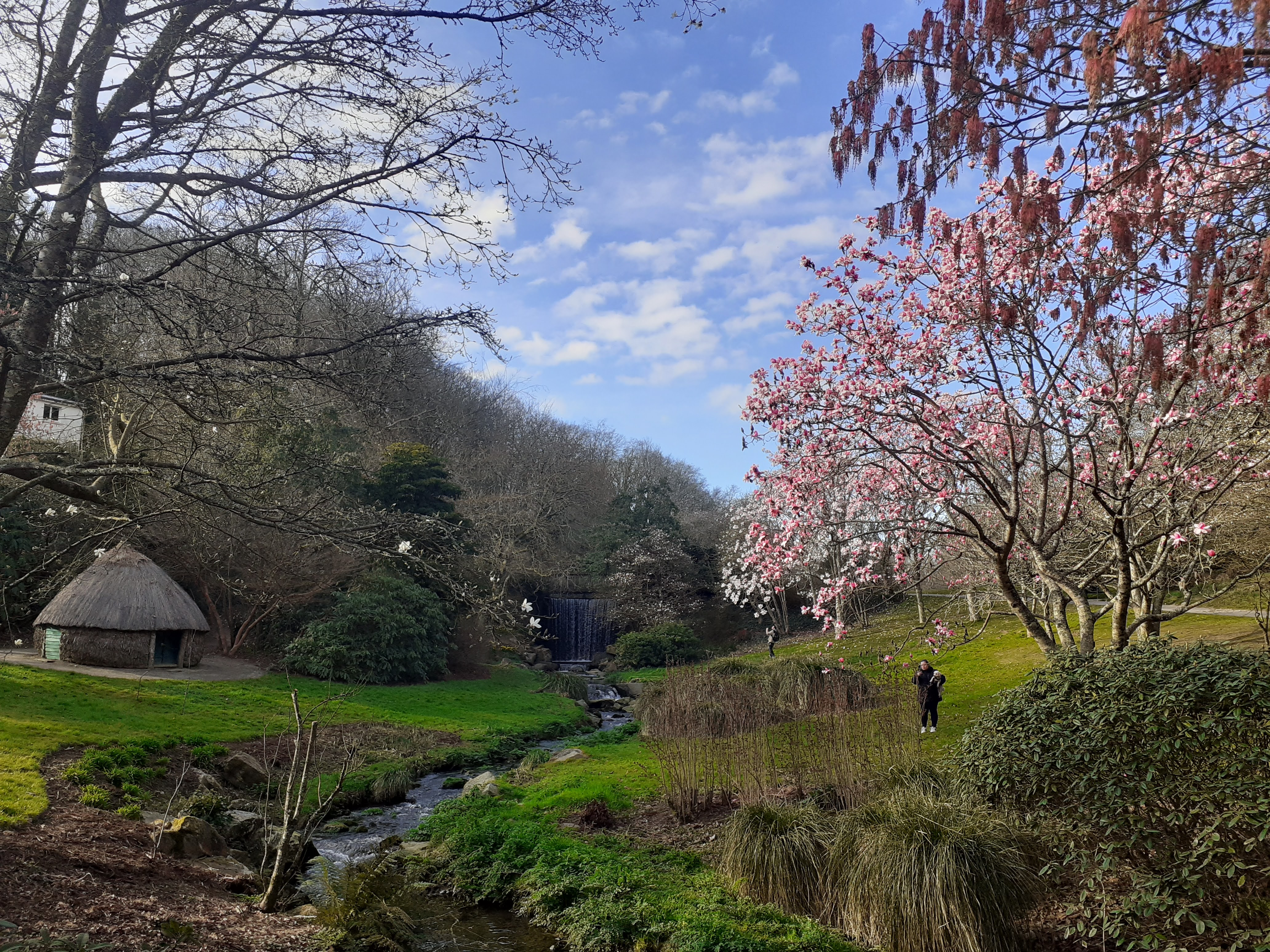
Spring in the garden of Conservatoire botanique national de Brest

== See also ==
- List of botanical gardens in France
- Jardin Exotique de Roscoff
- Zooparc de Trégomeur
- Zoo and Botanical Garden of Branféré

== Links ==
- Conservatoire botanique national de Brest
- Mairie Brest: Conservatoire (French)
- BGCI entry
- Association des Parcs et Jardins de Bretagne entry (French)
