= Le Guerno =

Commune in Brittany, France

Le Guerno Ar Gwernoù
- Commune
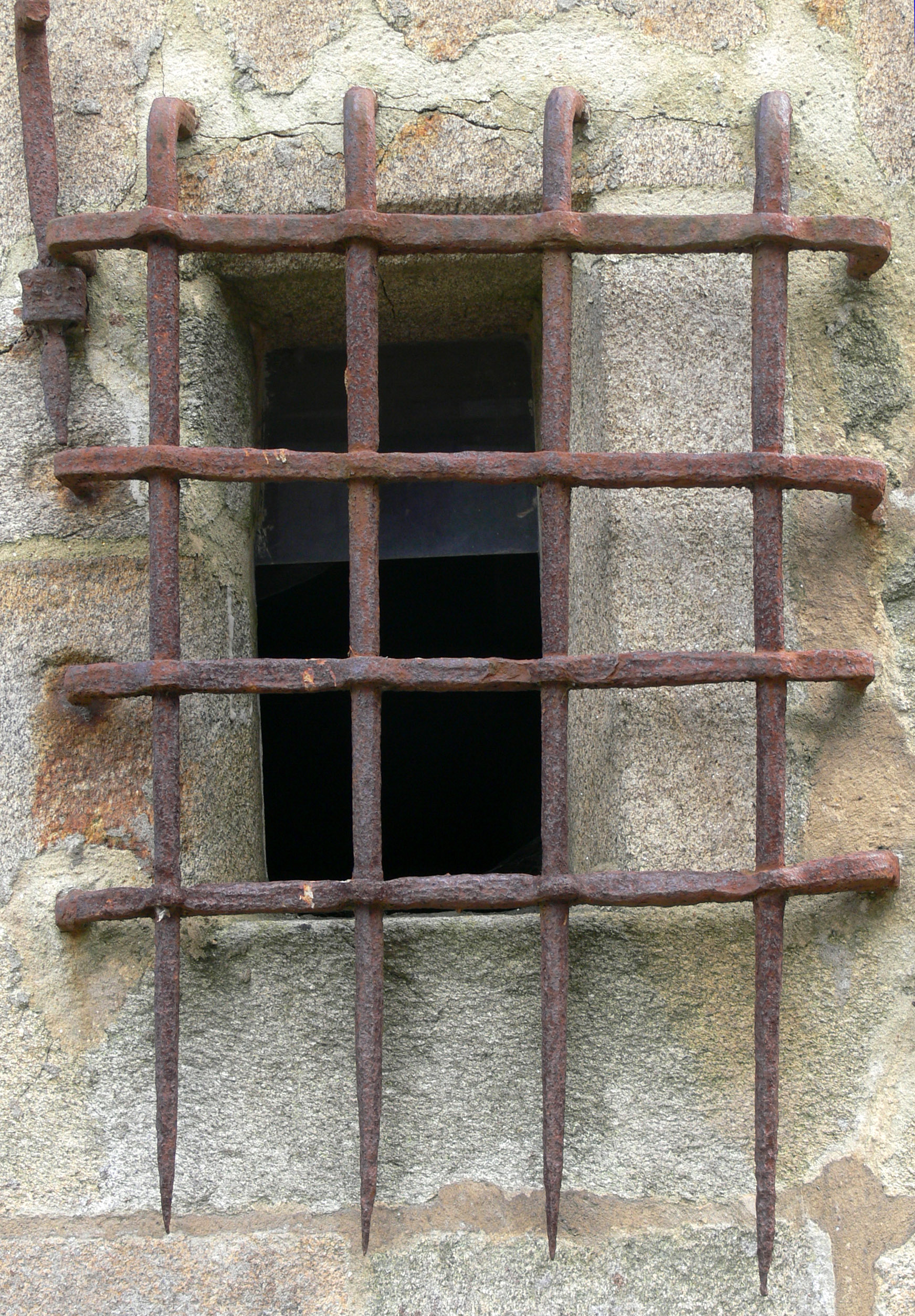
- A barred window of the church

- Coat of arms
- Location of Le Guerno
- Location within France Location within Brittany
- Coordinates: 47°35′02″N 2°24′25″W
- Country: France
- Region: Brittany
- Department: Morbihan
- Arrondissement: Vannes
- Canton: Muzillac
- Intercommunality: Arc Sud Bretagne

Government
  - Mayor (2026–32): Nadia Christmann
- Area^{1}: 9.75 km^{2} (3.76 sq mi)
- Highest elevation: 86 m (282 ft)
- Lowest elevation: 45 m (148 ft)
- Population (2023): 989
  - Density: 101/km^{2} (263/sq mi)
- Time zone: UTC+01:00 (CET)
  - Summer (DST): UTC+02:00 (CEST)
- INSEE/Postal code: 56077 /56190
- ^{1} French Land Register data, which excludes lakes, ponds, glaciers > 1 km^{2} (0.386 sq mi or 247 acres) and river estuaries.

Le Guerno (French pronunciation: [lə ɡɛʁno] or [lə ɡɥɛʁno]; Breton: Ar Gwernoù) is a commune in the Morbihan department of Brittany in north-western France. Inhabitants of Le Guerno are called Guernotais.

== Points of interest ==
- Zoo and Botanical Garden of Branféré, a zoo and botanical garden

== See also ==
- Communes of the Morbihan department
