= Sisters of the Cenacle =

The Sisters of the Cenacle (full title: Congregation of Our Lady of the Retreat in the Cenacle) is a Roman Catholic Congregation founded in 1826 in the village of Lalouvesc (Ardèche), France. The founders were Saint Thérèse Couderc and diocesan priest Jean-Pierre Etienne Terme.

The sisters' ministry is focused on spiritual direction and hosting religious retreats. As of 2021, over 325 sisters serve in more than fifteen countries; the headquarters is in Rome.

== History ==
Saint Thérèse Couderc, 1805-1885

The French Revolution had left people with a deeply disturbed faith, few religious leaders, and little, if any, education in faith. In the early decades of the nineteenth century, seminaries were being re-opened and mission bands roamed the countryside in an effort to rekindle the faith.

Marie-Victoire-Thérèse Couderc, who lived in the small hamlet of Le Mas in Sablières, located in Southern France. In 1825, her father brought her home from school to participate with the rest of the family in a mission given at Sablières. This mission was to be given by an energetic and zealous priest, Etienne Terme, who had recently founded a small group of teaching Sisters, called the Sisters of St. Regis. When Victoire revealed to him that she would like to enter religious life, he offered to take her to the novitiate of the Sisters of St. Regis. Although her father was unhappy with this prospect, he eventually relented, and Victoire entered the Sisters of St. Regis and became Sister Thérèse.

The shrine of Saint John Francis Regis at Lalouvesc attracted large crowds. In 1826, Father Terme was distressed when he saw the disorder that often accompanied the pilgrimages. Since there was no suitable place for the women pilgrims to stay, he took the initiative and opened a hostel to welcome women and girls, entrusting it to some of the Sisters of Saint Regis. In 1828, Thérèse Couderc was named Superior of the small congregation, and when Lalouvesc was made the mother house, she was named the Superior General.

=== Beginnings of the retreat ministry ===
At the hostel for women, the Sisters took in all who came to the door, and when they did not have enough beds, they spread straw in the corridors. Not only was the place crowded, but it was noisy and unruly. Mother Thérèse approached Father Terme and told him that they could not live religious life in these circumstances. She managed, with a bit of difficulty it appears, to convince him that from then on, only those women who were willing to make their stay a time of serious prayer would be given lodging.

The next step was when Father Terme introduced the Spiritual Exercises of Ignatius of Loyola, and the Sisters began using these to guide the women who came to the house to pray.

Father Terme died in 1834 at the peak of his missionary activity. In his will he confided his "daughters of the Retreat" to the Fathers of the Society of Jesus, who continued the formation of the Sisters in Ignatian spirituality and the use of the Spiritual Exercises.

The original inspiration matured and took a definite form. Gradually it became clear that the Congregation was evolving into one which reflected the spirit and mission of the community gathered with Mary the Mother of Jesus in the Upper Room, or Cenacle (Latin: coenaculum). The new institute grew rapidly and soon counted houses in France, Italy, Belgium, Switzerland, and Holland. During the Franco-Prussian War, the sisters of Paris and Versailles took an active part in the civil ambulances.

In England, the first house was opened at Manchester, in 1888. The year 1892 saw the first foundation in America, at New York.

In 1892, four sisters left Le Havre for New York at the invitation of Archbishop Michael Corrigan. Initially they stayed with the Dominican nuns of Corpus Christi Monastery in Hunts Point, Bronx before purchasing property at W 140th St. in Manhattan, where they established the Convent of St. Regis. The Lake Ronkonkoma land was donated by stage actress Maude Adams after her death. Her grave and Lake Ronkonkoma Home reside on the land to this day.

The sisters opened a retreat house in the Brighton section of Boston in 1910; it closed in 1994.

== Present day ==
The Society of Our Lady of the Cenacle honours particularly, and proposes to itself for its model, the retirement of the Blessed Virgin in the Cenacle, after the Ascension of our Lord, while the whole Church, expecting the Holy Ghost, "were persevering with one mind in prayer with the women, and Mary the mother of Jesus" (Acts 1:14).

As of 2021, there were 327 sisters serving in various countries. The Generalate is in Rome. The apostolic service of the Cenacle Sisters takes the form of retreats, spiritual direction, religious education, or other spiritual ministries.

Faced with diminishing financial resources and increasing maintenance costs, the Cenacle in Metairie, Louisiana closed in 2013. In 2020, the Houston Cenacle closed and became the lay-run Emmaus Spirituality Center. Also in 2020, due to a lack of personnel, the Cenacle property in Ronkonkoma, New York was sold to the Diocese of Rockville Centre to provide a residence for retired priests. There are about three Cenacle retreat houses in the United States.

== Locations ==
In September 2011, the 5 countries of England, Ireland, France, Togo and Italy became one Province, the province of Europe-Togo. The North American Province is based in Chicago, Illinois.

The Cenacle is also located in:

- Australia
- Belgium
- Bosnia-Herzegovina
- Brazil
- Canada
- Macau, China S.A.R.
- Madagascar
- Netherlands
- New Zealand
- Philippines
- Singapore
- United States

== Sources ==
- "Origin of the Congregation," Congregation of Our Lady of the Retreat in the Cenacle: Constitutions and Norms (Chicago: 1984)
- Rose Hoover, rc, "A Brief History of the Cenacle Through Elements of Spirituality"
- Cenacle Mission
