= Thérèse Couderc =

French Roman Catholic saint

Saint Thérèse Couderc

Virgin
- Born: 1 February 1805; Mas de Sablières, Ardèche, First French Empire
- Died: 26 September 1885 (aged 80); Lyon, Rhône, French Third Republic
- Venerated in: Roman Catholic Church
- Beatified: 4 November 1951, Saint Peter's Basilica, Vatican City by Pope Pius XII
- Canonized: 10 May 1970, Saint Peter's Square, Vatican City by Pope Paul VI
- Feast: 26 September
- Patronage: Sisters of the Cenacle

Thérèse Couderc (1 February 1805 – 26 September 1885), born Marie-Victoire Couderc, was a French religious sister and the co-founder of the Sisters of the Cenacle. Couderc underwent humiliations during her time as a sister for she was forced to resign from positions and was ridiculed and mocked due to false accusations made against her though this softened towards the end of her life. She was a spiritual writer having written on sacrifice and service to God. After her death, she left a series of spiritual writings. Pope Paul VI canonised her in 1970.

== Life ==
Marie-Victoire Couderc was born in 1805 in Le Mas as the fourth of twelve children to farmers Claude Michel Corderc (1780-???) and Anne Méry; her parents married in 1801. One sibling was Jean and two others died in their childhood. The surviving children were eight sons and two daughters; Couderc was the elder one. In her childhood she attended Mass twice a week. She received her First Communion in 1815.

In 1822 her parents sent her to a boarding school at Vans and she remained there until in Lent 1825 when her father wanted her to attend a school in their local area. In 1825, she entered the novitiate of the Sisters of Saint Regis, a teaching congregation in Lalouvesc. Couderc, who took the religious name Thérèse, made her the perpetual vows on 6 January 1837.

Couderc and two other sisters were sent to care for female pilgrims at a hostel at the shrine of St. John Francis Regis in Lalouvesc. In 1826, Couderc co-founded the Sisters of the Cenacle with a priest, Jean-Pierre Etienne Terme, and became their superior in 1828. Desirous to provide women a place for recollection in solitude, prayer, and meditation, they resolved to open houses where women could make retreat. When a motherhouse was established, Couderc became superior general. In 1828, Jean-Pierre Etienne Terme began to hold Ignatian retreats for the sisters. He continued to do so until his death in December 1834. After Terme's death the congregation split into the Sisters of Saint Regis who retained teaching, and the Congregation of Our Lady of the Cenacle, which continued its retreat ministry. Jesuits then led the retreats.

The regular school teaching of the hostel was separated from the retreats, and this resulted in financial hardship for the sisters. Although she was not at fault, Couderc accepted responsibility. This led, in October 1838, to the Bishop of Viviers, Abbon-Pierre-François Bonnel de la Brageresse, to remove her from her office; Couderc resigned in full on 27 October 1838.

In 1842 she was sent for almost eighteen months with another sister to a small house in Lyon; in 1852 she went to Paris. In November 1856 she was appointed as the superior of the Tournon house until it was to be sold off and so she returned to Lyon. On 20 October 1859 a Jesuit gave a retreat on the topic of Christian sacrifice that had a profound impact on her. At the end of August 1860 she was sent to the house at Montpellier but its closure in 1867 saw her return to Lyon once more.

In the beginning of 1885 she fainted and was unconscious for several hours in an occurrence that left her bedridden until her death. Couderc died on 26 September 1885 and was buried in Lalouvesc.

== Beatification process ==
The beatification cause was opened on 18 July 1927, and Couderc was titled as a Servant of God. Pope Pius XI proclaimed Couderc to be venerable on 12 May 1935 after he confirmed her heroic virtue. Pope Pius XII beatified her on 4 November 1951 after approving two miracles attributed to her intercession. Pope Paul VI canonized Couderc on 10 May 1970 after approving two more miracles attributed to her intercession.

== Spirituality ==
=== To surrender oneself ===
In 1864 Couderc wrote:

I understand the full extent of the expression to surrender oneself, but I cannot explain it. I only know that it is very vast, that it embraces both the present and the future.

To surrender oneself is more than to devote oneself, more than to give oneself, it is even something more than to abandon oneself to God. In a word, to surrender oneself is to die to everything and to self, to be no longer concerned with self except to keep it continually turned toward God.

To surrender oneself is, moreover, no longer to seek oneself in anything, either for the spiritual or the physical, that is to say, no longer to seek one's own satisfaction, but solely the divine good pleasure.

It should be added that to surrender oneself is also to follow that spirit of detachment which clings to nothing, neither to persons nor to things, neither to time nor to place. It means to adhere to everything, to accept everything, to submit to everything.

But perhaps you will think that this is very difficult to do. Do not let yourself be deceived. There is nothing so easy to do, nothing so sweet to put into practice. The whole thing consists in making a generous act once and for all, saying with all the sincerity of your soul: "My God, I wish to be entirely thine; deign to accept my offering." And all is said. But from then on, you must take care to keep yourself in this disposition of soul and not to shrink from any of the little sacrifices which can help you advance in virtue. You must always remember that you have surrendered yourself.

I pray to our Lord to give an understanding of this word to all souls desirous of pleasing him and to inspire them to take advantage of so easy a means of sanctification. Oh! If people could just understand ahead of time the sweetness and peace that are savored when nothing is held back from the good God! How he communicates himself to the one who seeks him sincerely and has known how to surrender herself. Let them experience it and they will see that here is found the true happiness they are vainly seeking elsewhere.

The surrendered soul has found paradise on earth.

=== Goodness ===
In 1866, Couderc reported having a vision of goodness which was a defining moment for her life and spirituality, and which she describes in a letter to Mother de Larochenégly:

A few days ago, I saw something that consoled me very much. It was during my thanksgiving, when I was making a few reflections on the goodness of God — and how would it be possible not to think of this in such moments: of this infinite goodness, uncreated goodness, source of all goodness! And without which there would be no goodness, neither in people nor in other creatures.

I was extremely touched by these reflections, when I saw written as in letters of gold this word Goodness, which I repeated for a long while with an indescribable sweetness. I saw it, I say, written on all creatures, animate and inanimate, rational or not — all bore this name of goodness. I saw it even on the chair which I was using for a kneeler. I understood then that all that these creatures have of good and all the services and help that we receive from each of them are a blessing that we owe to the goodness of our God, who has communicated to them something of his infinite goodness, so that we may meet it in everything and everywhere.

== Sources ==
- Paule de Lassus, rc, "Thérèse Couderc, 1805-1885: la femme - la sainte" (Lyon: Lescuyer,1985)
- Stogdon, Kate (December 9, 2010). "Expressions of Self-surrender in 19th-century France: The Case of Therese Couderc (1805-1885)". In Lux-Sterritt, Laurence; Mangion, Carmen (eds.). Gender, Catholicism and Spirituality: Women and the Roman Catholic Church in Britain and Europe, 1200-1900. Basingstoke: Bloomsbury. ISBN 978-1-3503-0783-4.
- Saint Thérèse Couderc / Šv. Teresė Kudirka. (Livre). R.S. Butautas-Kudirka. Publisher Gediminas p. 210. Vilnius. 2015. ISBN 978-9955-806-08-0
