= Aiglun =

Aiglun is the name of 2 communes in France:

- Aiglun, Alpes-de-Haute-Provence, in the Alpes-de-Haute-Provence department
- Aiglun, Alpes-Maritimes, in the Alpes-Maritimes department
