= Arboretum du Sarroudier =

Arboretum in Provence-Alpes-Côte d'Azur, France

Coordinates: 43.7755°N 7.4755°E

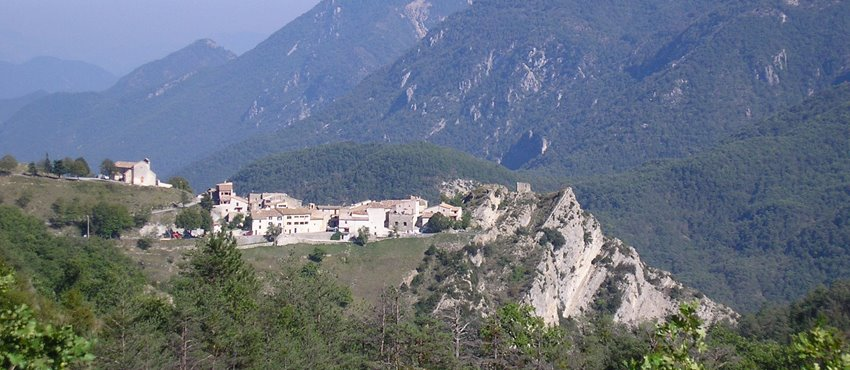
Overview of the village of Le Mas (Alpes-Maritimes)

The Arboretum du Sarroudier (60 hectares) is a new arboretum now taking shape in the village of Le Mas, Alpes-Maritimes, Provence-Alpes-Côte d'Azur, France. Its stated goal is to create the largest private arboretum in France.

The arboretum was founded in 2005 by Sauveur Gaëtan Mareschi on the grounds of a disused sheep farm owned by Cistercian monks of the Lérins Abbey. Its hilly site is about 780 meters above sea level. Some 30 hectares have been designated for the arboretum proper, including a pond, with an adjacent 9 hectares set aside for growing organic vegetables and ancient fruit varieties.

== See also ==
- List of botanical gardens in France
