= Lalouvesc =

- Commune
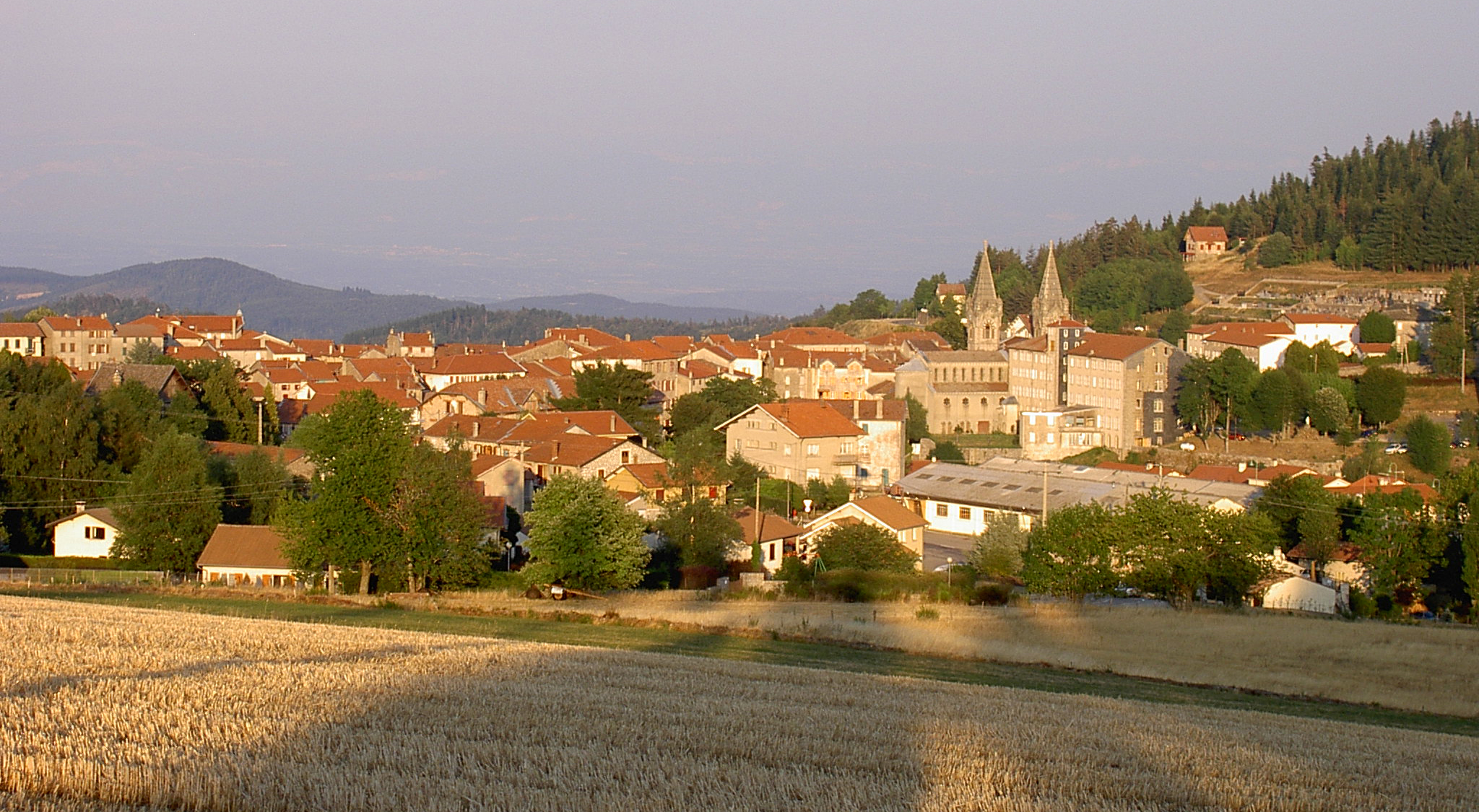
- A general view of Lalouvesc

- Coat of arms
- Location of Lalouvesc
- Location within France Location within Auvergne-Rhône-Alpes
- Coordinates: 45°07′15″N 4°32′08″E
- Country: France
- Region: Auvergne-Rhône-Alpes
- Department: Ardèche
- Arrondissement: Tournon-sur-Rhône
- Canton: Haut-Vivarais
- Intercommunality: Val d'Ay

Government
  - Mayor (2020–2026): Jacques Burriez
- Area^{1}: 10.53 km^{2} (4.07 sq mi)
- Elevation: 1,050 m (3,440 ft)
- Highest elevation: 1,256 m (4,121 ft)
- Lowest elevation: 716 m (2,349 ft)
- Population (2023): 388
  - Density: 36.8/km^{2} (95.4/sq mi)
- Time zone: UTC+01:00 (CET)
  - Summer (DST): UTC+02:00 (CEST)
- INSEE/Postal code: 07128 /07520
- ^{1} French Land Register data, which excludes lakes, ponds, glaciers > 1 km^{2} (0.386 sq mi or 247 acres) and river estuaries.

Lalouvesc (French pronunciation: [laluvɛsk]; Occitan: L'Alauvesc) is a commune in the Ardèche department in the southern east region of France.

== Population ==
Historical population
Year	Pop.	±% p.a.
1968	559	—
1975	470	−2.45%
1982	487	+0.51%
1990	514	+0.68%
1999	494	−0.44%
2007	489	−0.13%
2012	404	−3.75%
2017	386	−0.91%
2023	388	+0.09%
Source: INSEE

== Sights ==
The Basilica of St. Regis, designed in Byzantine Revival style and completed in 1877, contains the relics of St. John Francis Regis (Jean-François Régis). The windows of the basilica recount the life of the saint and the frescoes in the choir tell the history of pilgrimages to the place. The basilica includes a museum for visitors.

The house where the saint died, on 31 December 1640, is located nearby and has been transformed into a sanctuary.

== Personalities ==
St. Thérèse Couderc, co-founder of the Sisters of the Cenacle, also is buried in Lalouvesc.

== See also ==
- Communes of the Ardèche department
