= Aiglun, Alpes-Maritimes =

Commune in Provence-Alpes-Côte d'Azur, France

Aiglun
- Commune
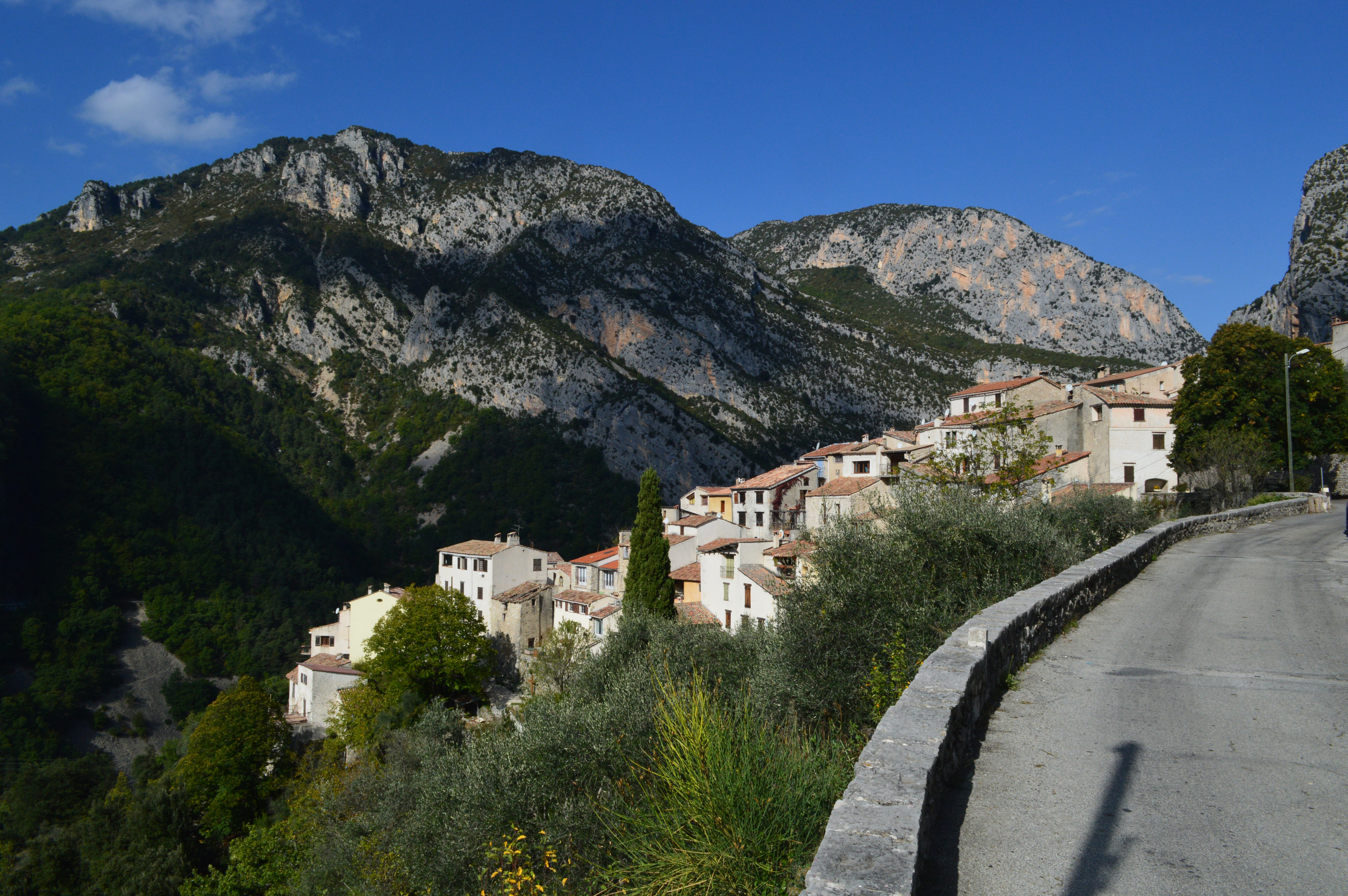
- A general view of the village

- Coat of arms
- Location of Aiglun
- Location within France Location within Provence-Alpes-Côte d'Azur
- Coordinates: 43°51′30″N 6°54′54″E
- Country: France
- Region: Provence-Alpes-Côte d'Azur
- Department: Alpes-Maritimes
- Arrondissement: Grasse
- Canton: Vence
- Intercommunality: Alpes d'Azur

Government
  - Mayor (2026–32): Anthony Salomone
- Area^{1}: 15.37 km^{2} (5.93 sq mi)
- Elevation: 624 m (2,047 ft)
- Highest elevation: 1,541 m (5,056 ft)
- Lowest elevation: 373 m (1,224 ft)
- Population (2023): 104
  - Density: 6.77/km^{2} (17.5/sq mi)
- Time zone: UTC+01:00 (CET)
  - Summer (DST): UTC+02:00 (CEST)
- INSEE/Postal code: 06001 /06910
- ^{1} French Land Register data, which excludes lakes, ponds, glaciers > 1 km^{2} (0.386 sq mi or 247 acres) and river estuaries.

Aiglun (French pronunciation: [ɛɡlœ̃]) is a commune in the Alpes-Maritimes department in the Provence-Alpes-Côte d'Azur region of southeastern France.

== Geography ==
Aiglun is a remote mountain commune some 40 km north-east of Nice in a straight line. There are only two access routes to the commune - the first by Highway D17 from Roquesteron to the east. Heading west on Highway D17 continue left onto Highway D10 which continues via a mountainous route into the commune and the village of Aiglun. The other access is the continuation of Highway D10 west from Aiglun over a circuitous mountain route to Le Mas. The Estéron river passes through the commune south of the village and forms part of the western border of the commune as well as a small portion of the eastern border. Numerous streams feed into this river in the commune.

The northern part of the commune consists of high snow-capped mountains while the southern part is less high mountains. There are few roads however there are four hamlets in the Esteron Valley: Vascogne, Les Lones, Le Colombier, and L'Escle.

== History ==
In 1388 the village of Aiglun was under the protection of the House of Savoy like the rest of the region during the "Dédition of Nice to Savoy" from 1388.

At the Treaty of Turin on 24 March 1760, the commune became French (the kingdom of France and that of Sardinia then proceeded to boundary adjustments and therefore there was an exchange of territories).

=== Toponymy ===
The name of the town appears for the first time in texts around 1200 in the form Ayglezuni. This was derived from the Latin word Aquila, meaning "eagle", and the Gallic dunum, meaning "height" and signifies as a whole the "height of the eagle".

== Heraldry ==
Arms of Aiglun	Blazon: Azure, a spread eagle of Argent over a salmon the same.

== Administration ==
List of Successive Mayors of Aiglun

Mayors from 1870 to 1942

From	To	Name	Party	Position
1870	1874	Jean-Baptiste GRANIER		
1874	1876	Antoine BERNARD		
1876	1878	Louis BERNARD		
1878	1881	Auguste BONNEFROI		
1881	1884	Désiré MARTEL		
1884	1888	Joseph DAUMAS		
1888	1896	Désiré MARTEL		
1896	1900	Jean-Pierre JAUME		
1900	1901	Pierre GUIZOL		
1901	1912	Joseph ROBIN		
1912	1920	Jean-Pierre JAUME		
1920	1942	Antoine ROUX		

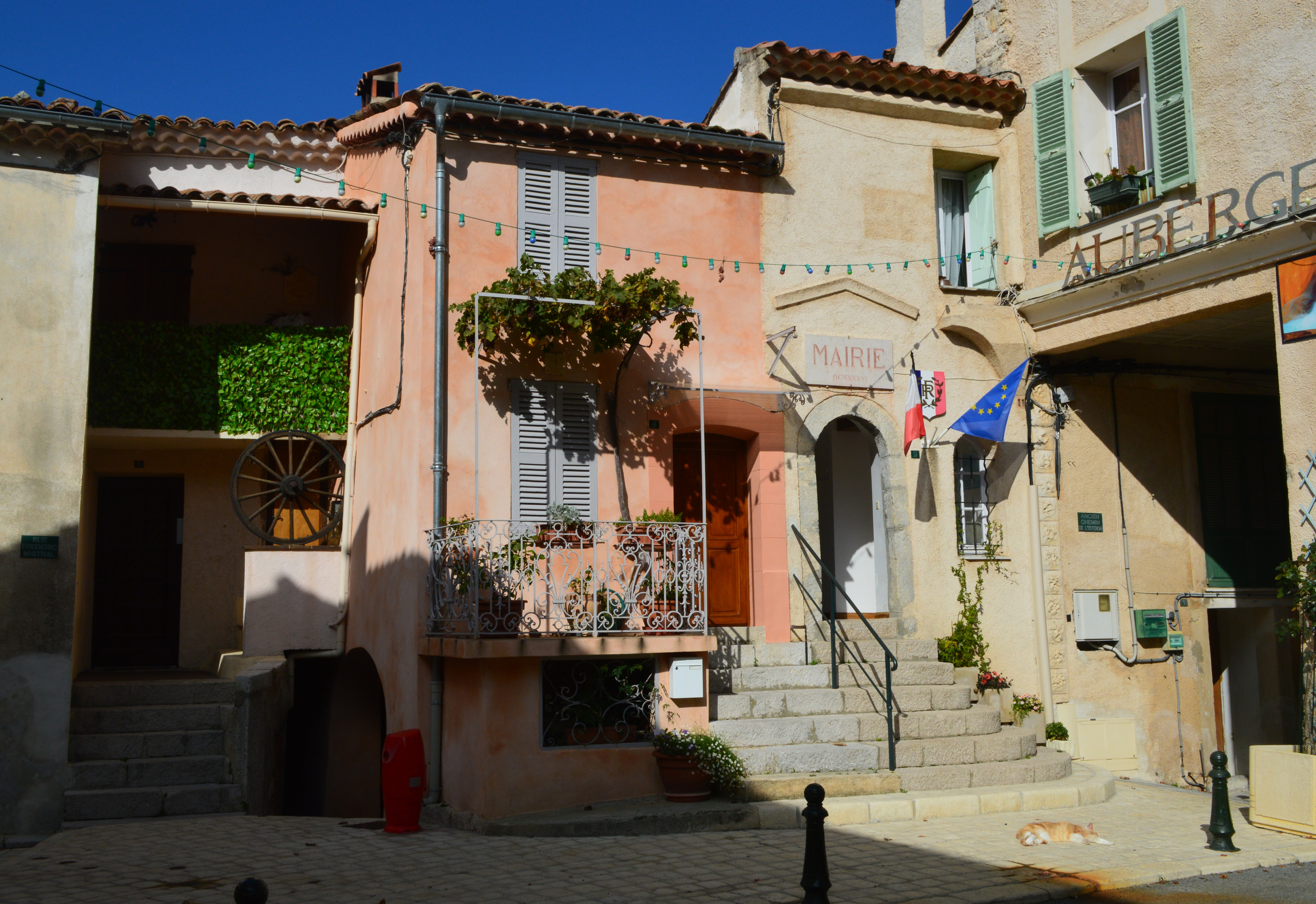
The Town Hall

Mayors from 1942

From	To	Name	Party
1942	1945	François Blanc	
1945	1978	Pierre Martin	
1978	2001	Marius Blanc	
2001	2005	Irene Montiglio	SE
2005	2014	Charles Bremond	DVD
2014	2020	Didier Nicolas	
2020	Current	Anthony Salomone	

== Population ==
The inhabitants of the commune are known as Aiglenois or Aiglenoises in French.

Historical population

Year	Pop.	±% p.a.
1793	240	—
1821	250	+0.15%
1846	366	+1.54%
1872	272	−1.14%
1901	150	−2.03%
1926	115	−1.06%
1946	95	−0.95%
1962	58	−3.04%
1968	50	−2.44%

Year	Pop.	±% p.a.
1975	70	+4.92%
1982	94	+4.30%
1990	91	−0.40%
1999	106	+1.71%
2007	92	−1.76%
2012	91	−0.22%
2017	91	+0.00%
2023	104	+2.25%

Source: EHESS and INSEE

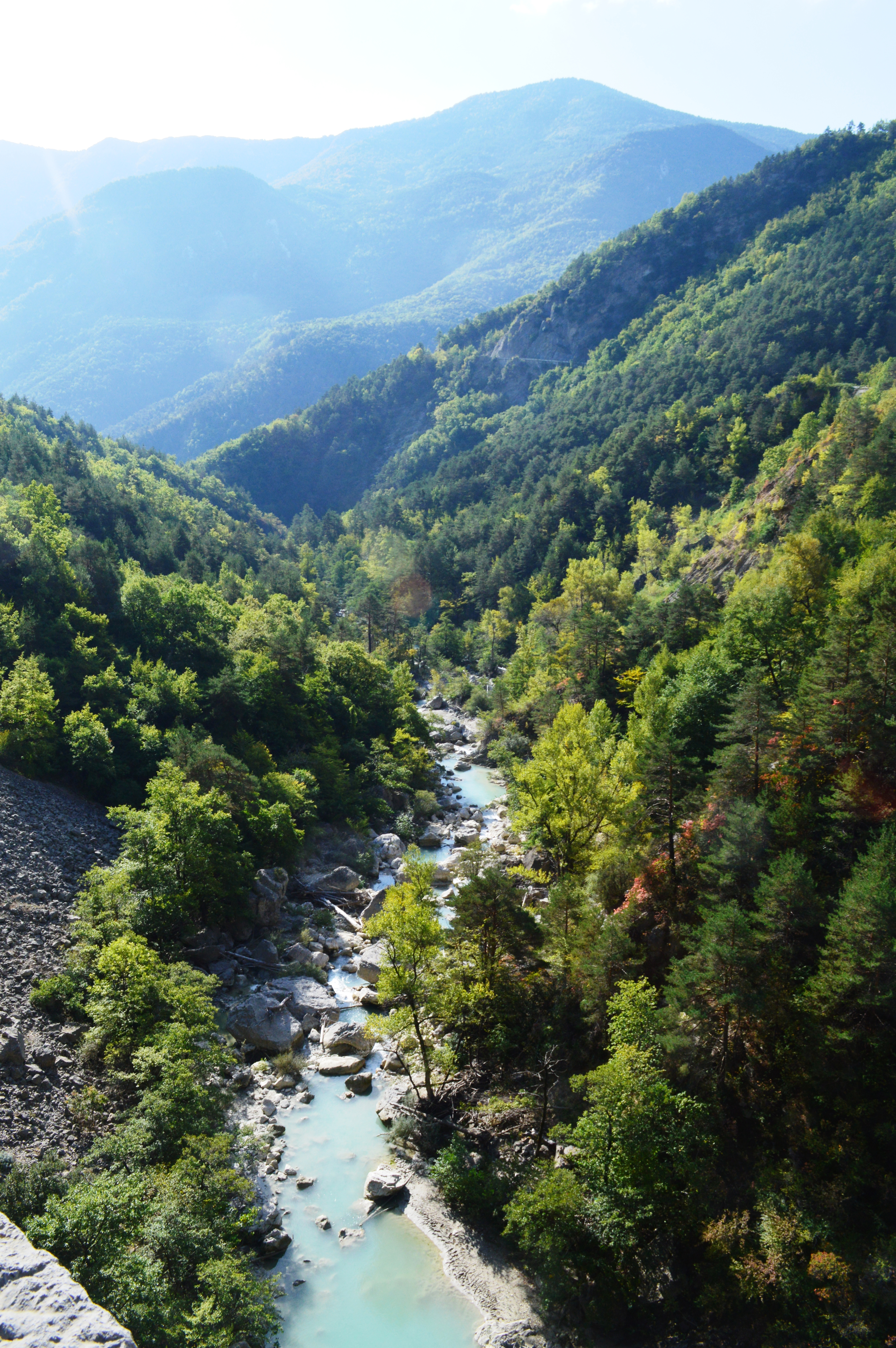
The Estéron river

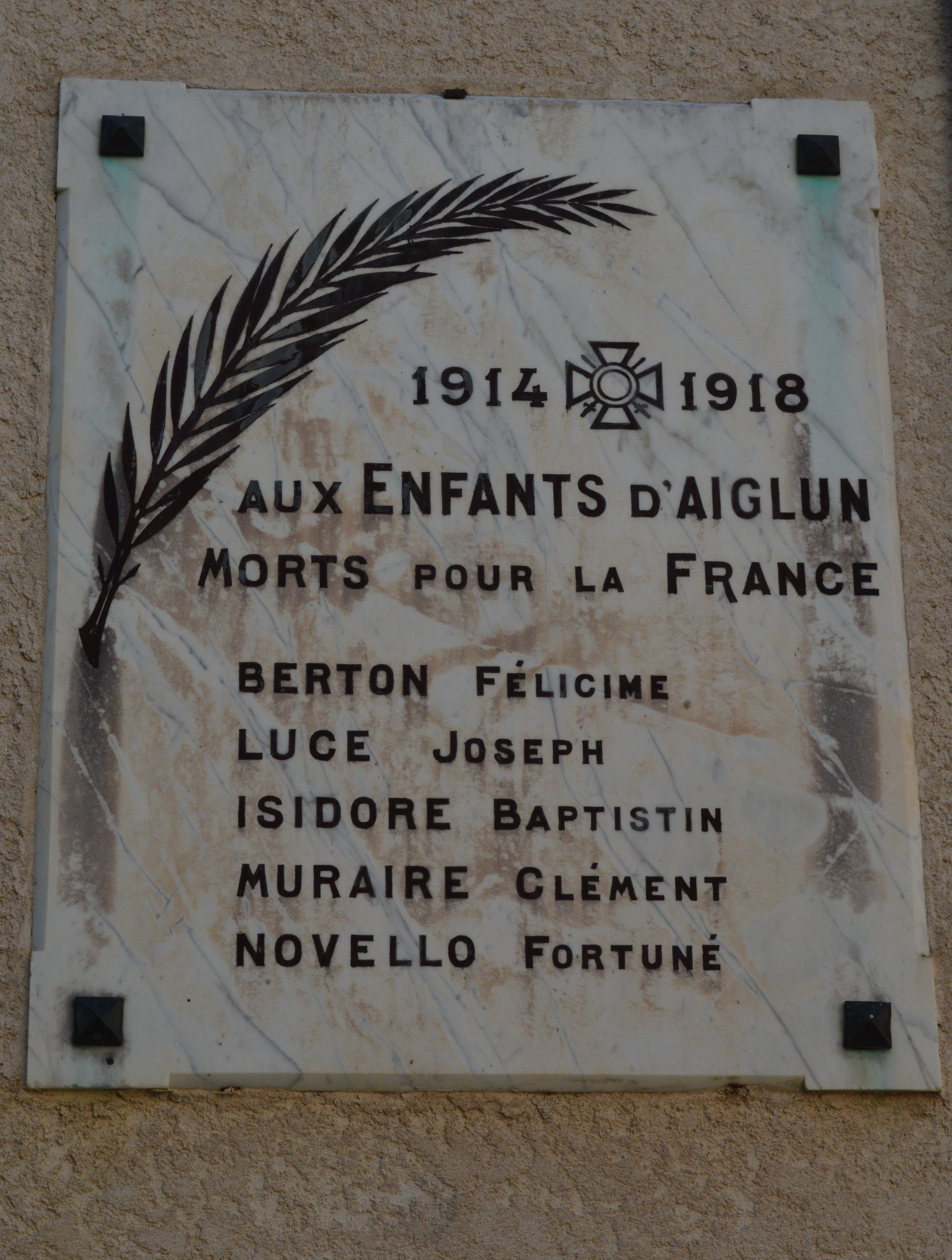
Aiglun War Memorial

== Sites and Monuments ==
The village is known for its steep climbing walls over 200 metres high with high difficulty routes. The Aiglun canyon is also popular for canyoning enthusiasts.

=== Aiglun Picture Gallery ===
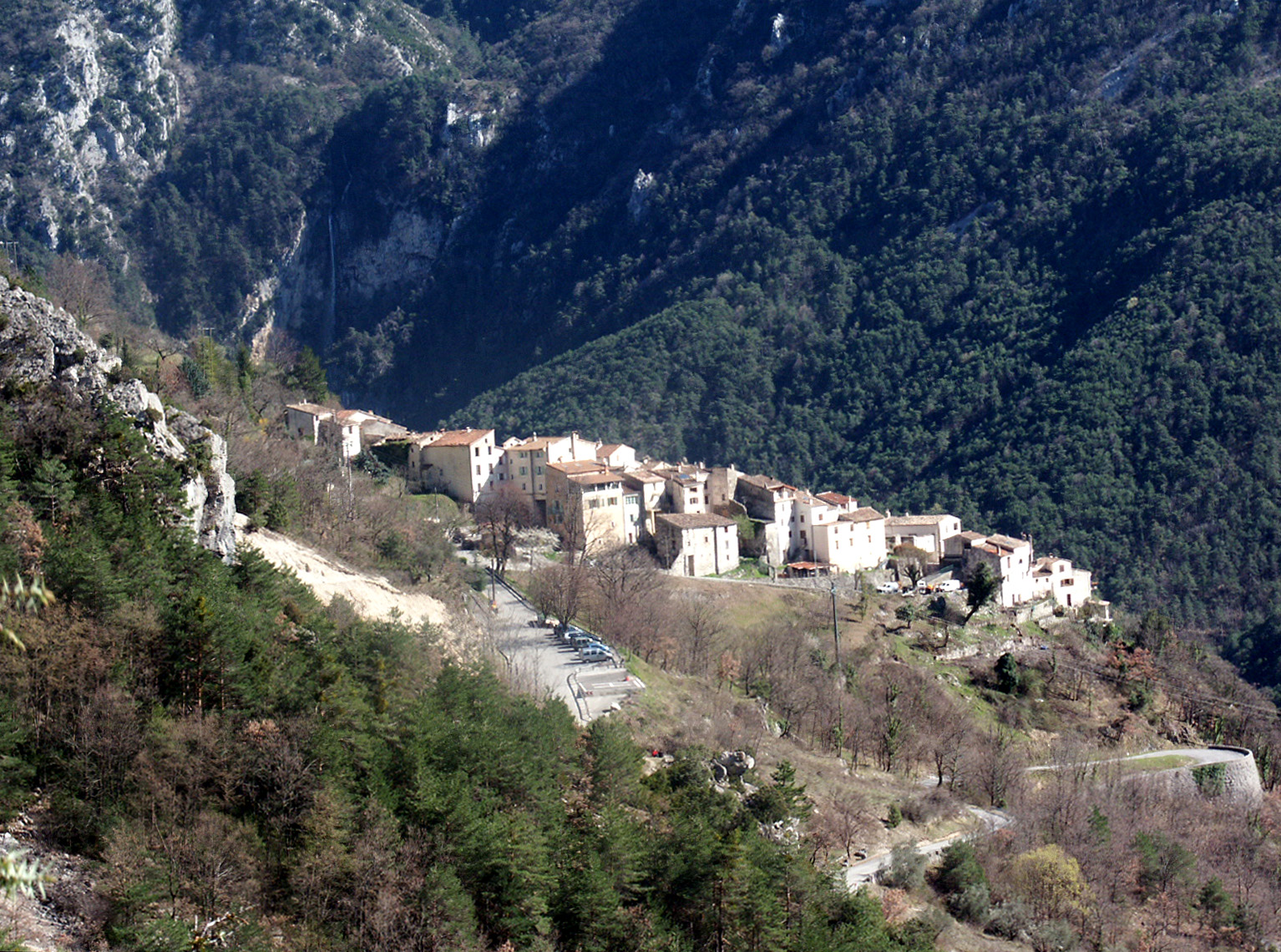
The Village

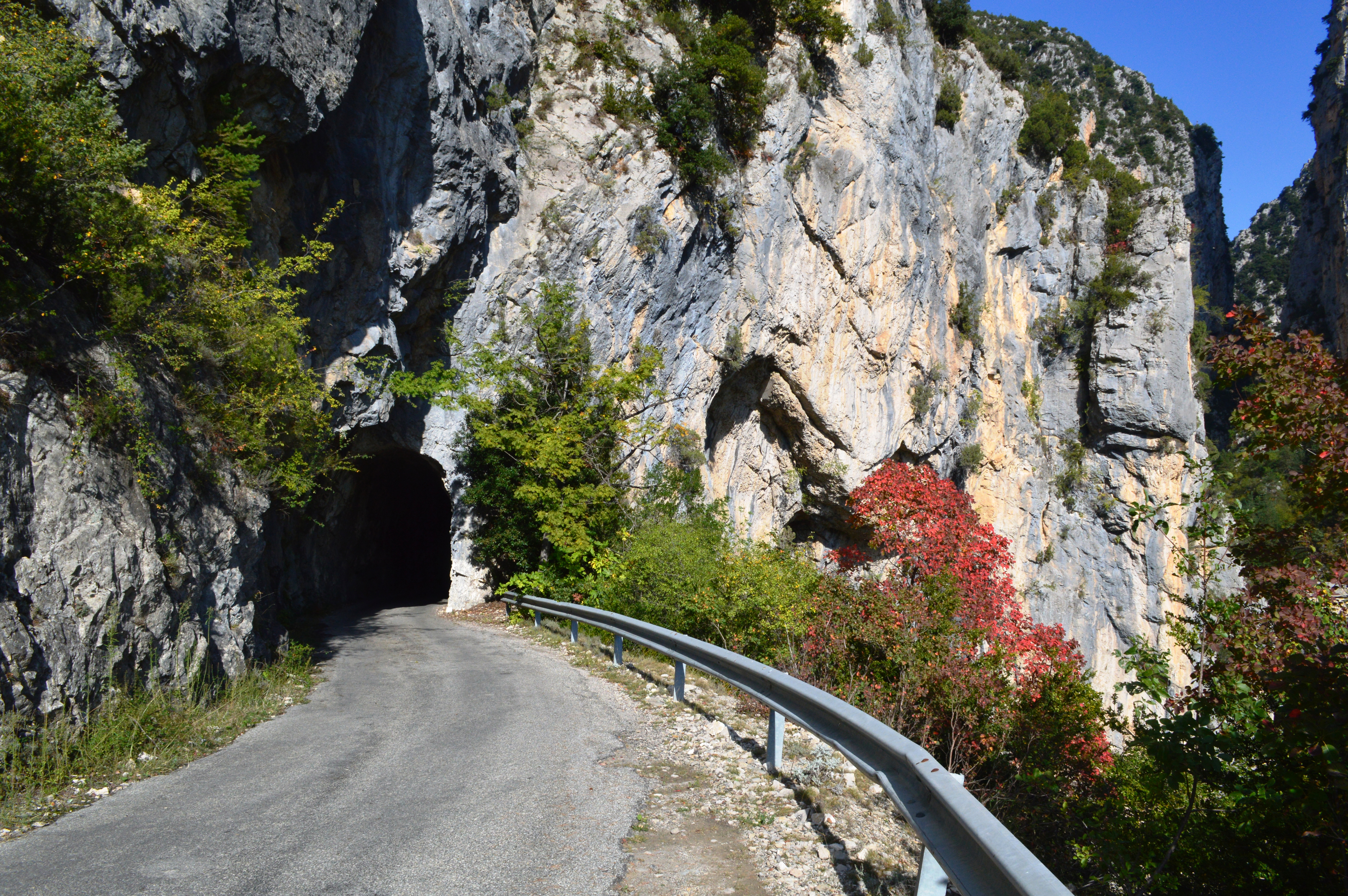
First tunnel on the road to the village

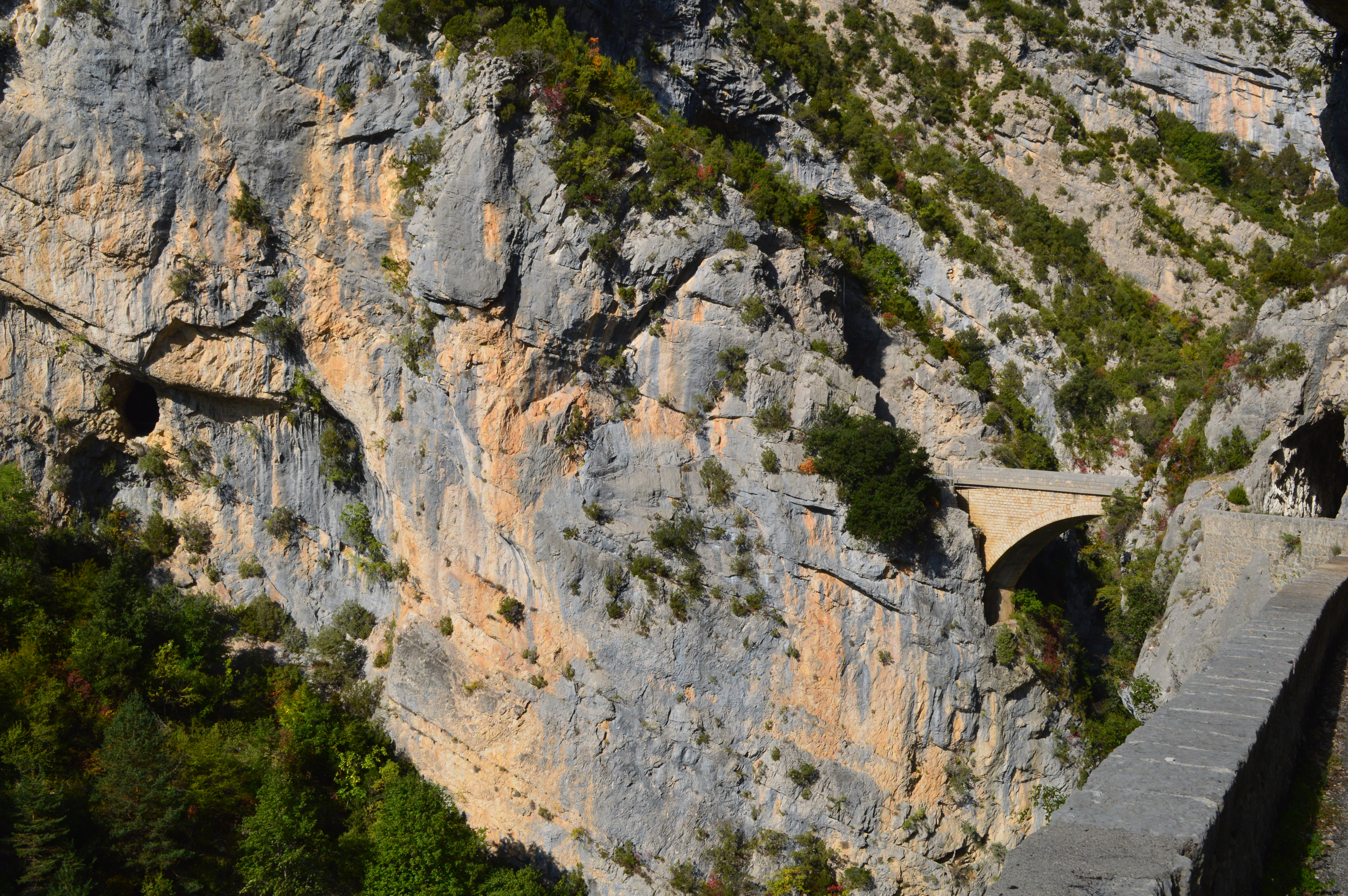
The bridge entering Aiglun

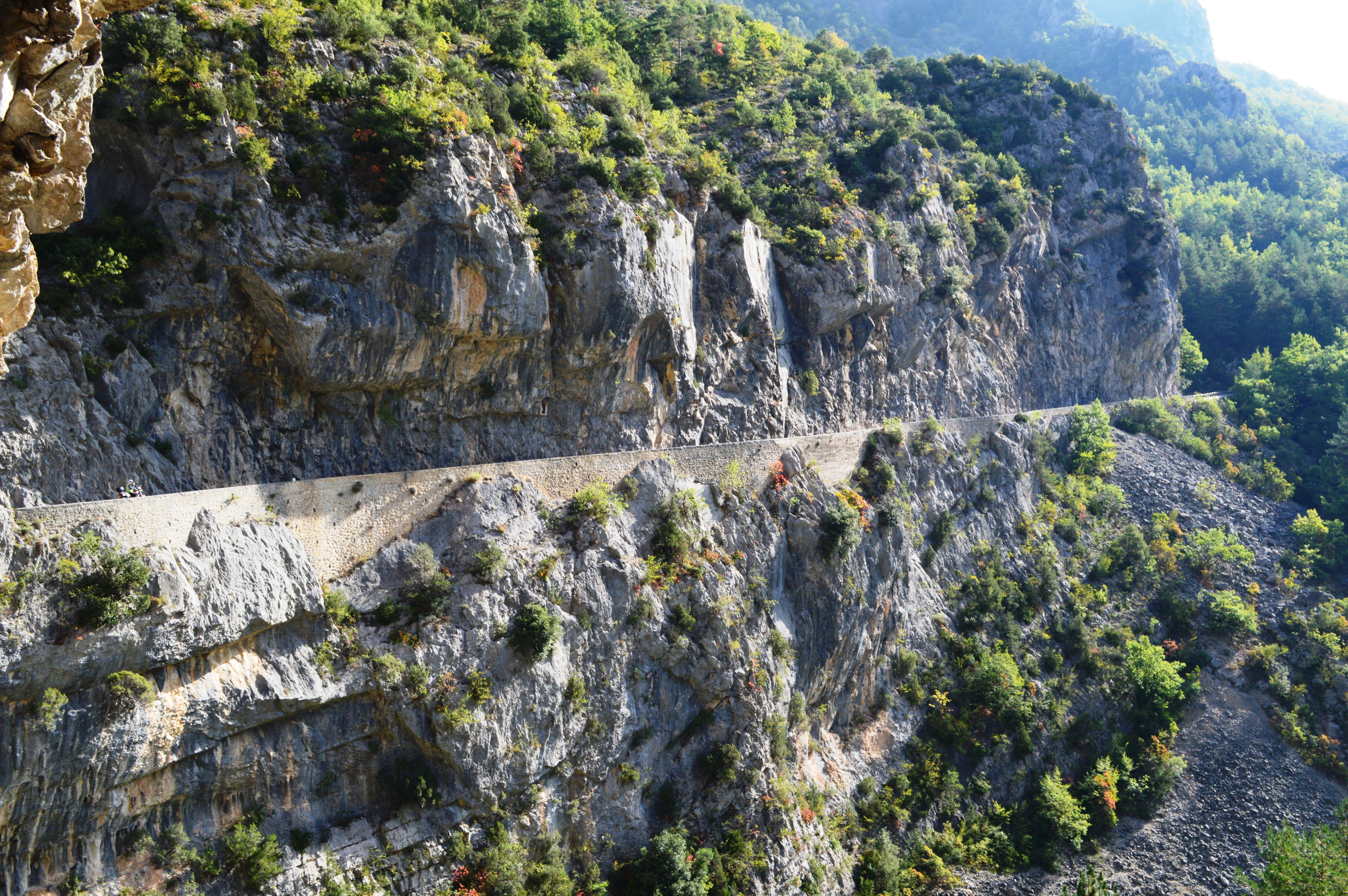
The cliff road into Aiglun

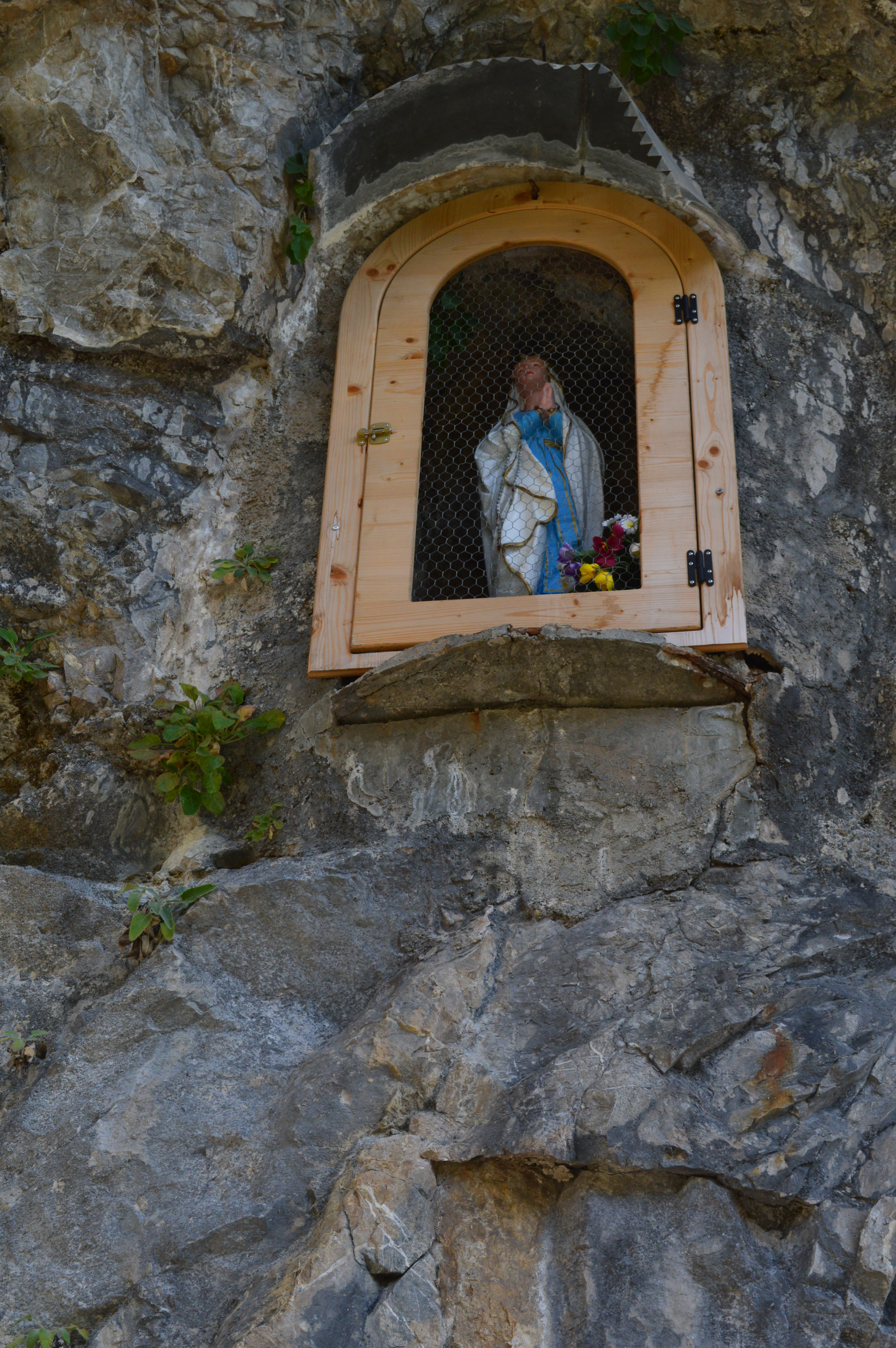
An Oratory in the cliff face

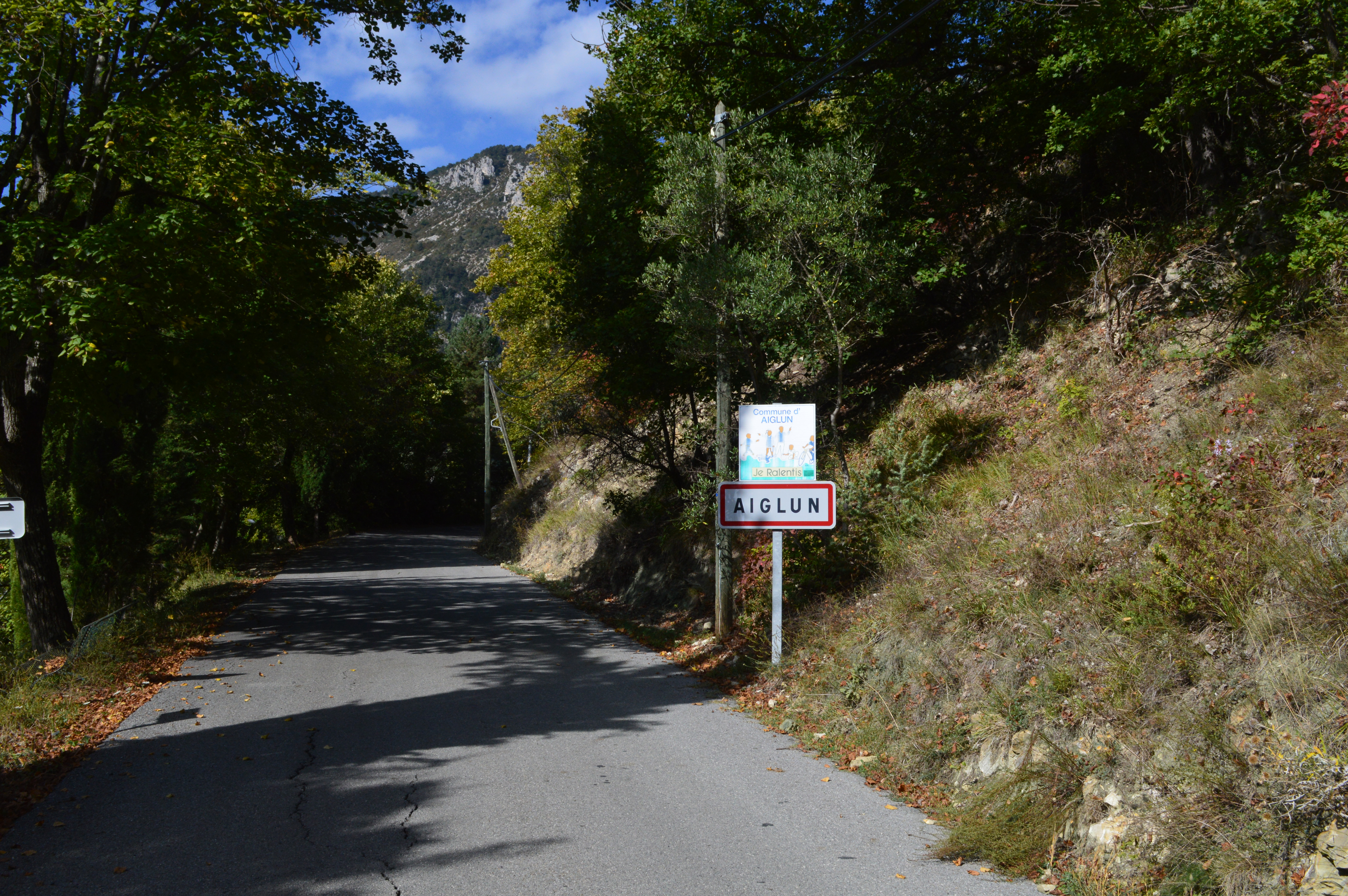
The entry to Aiglun

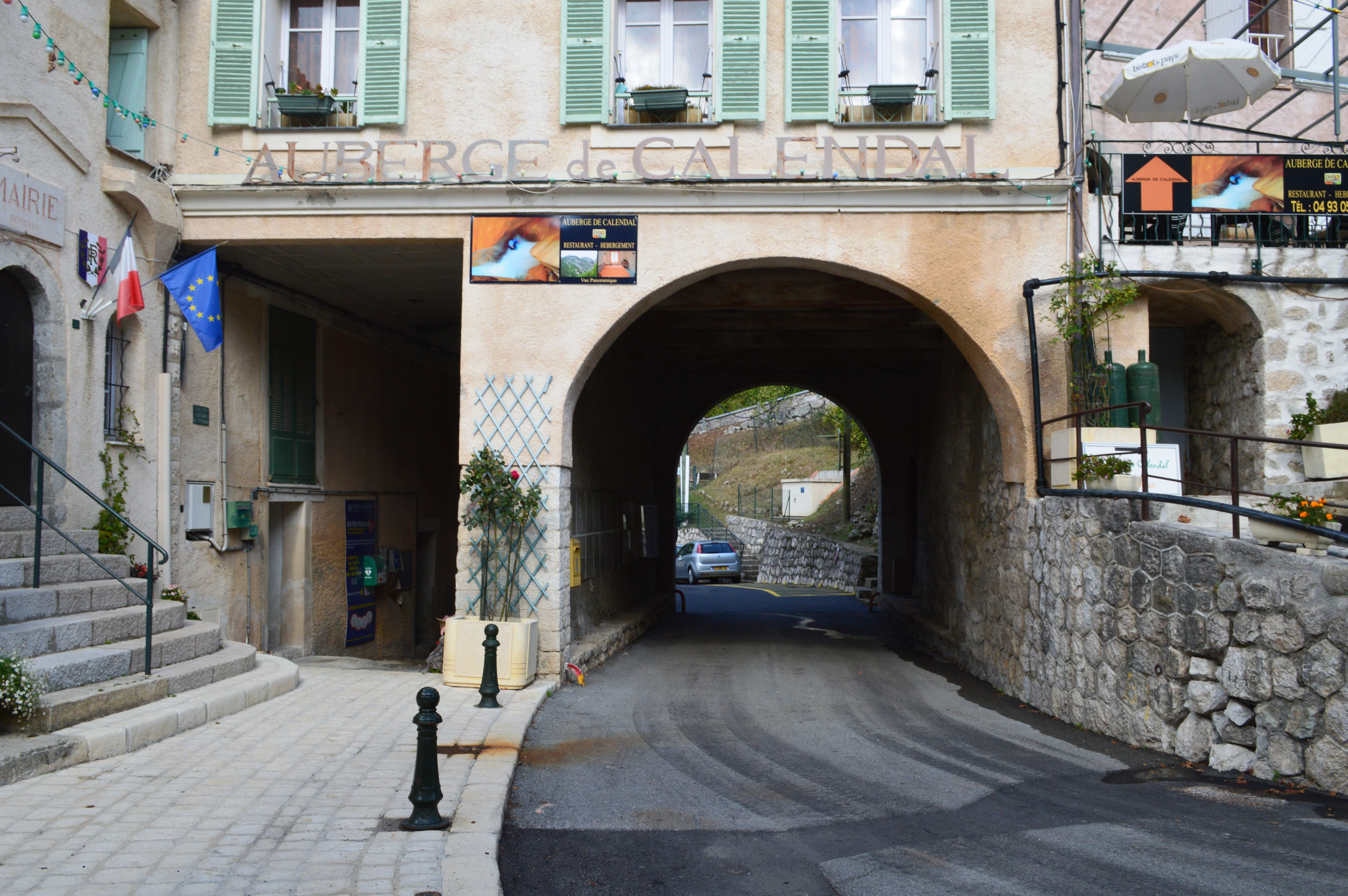
Main entrance to Aiglun

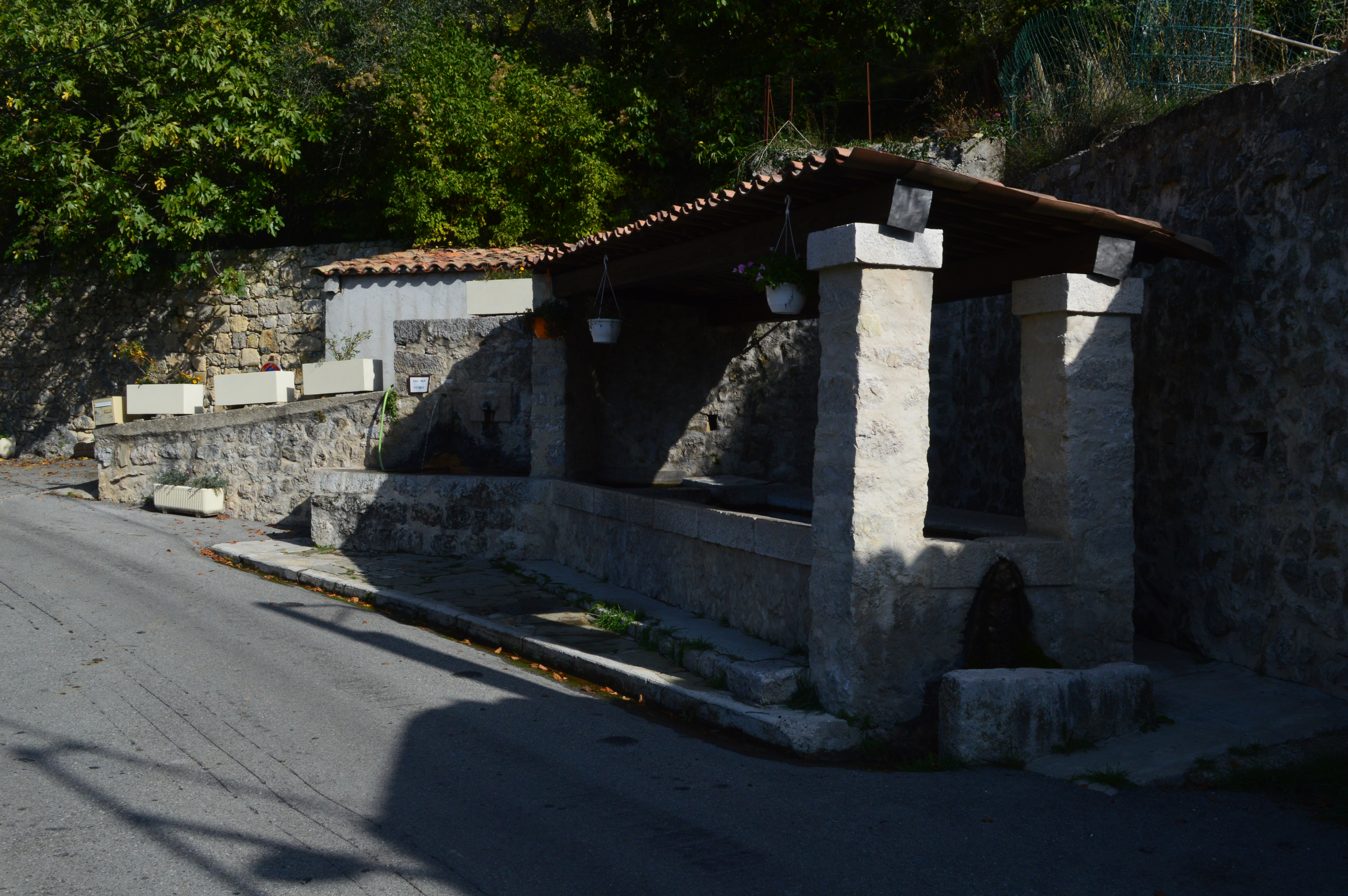
Aiglun Water Trough

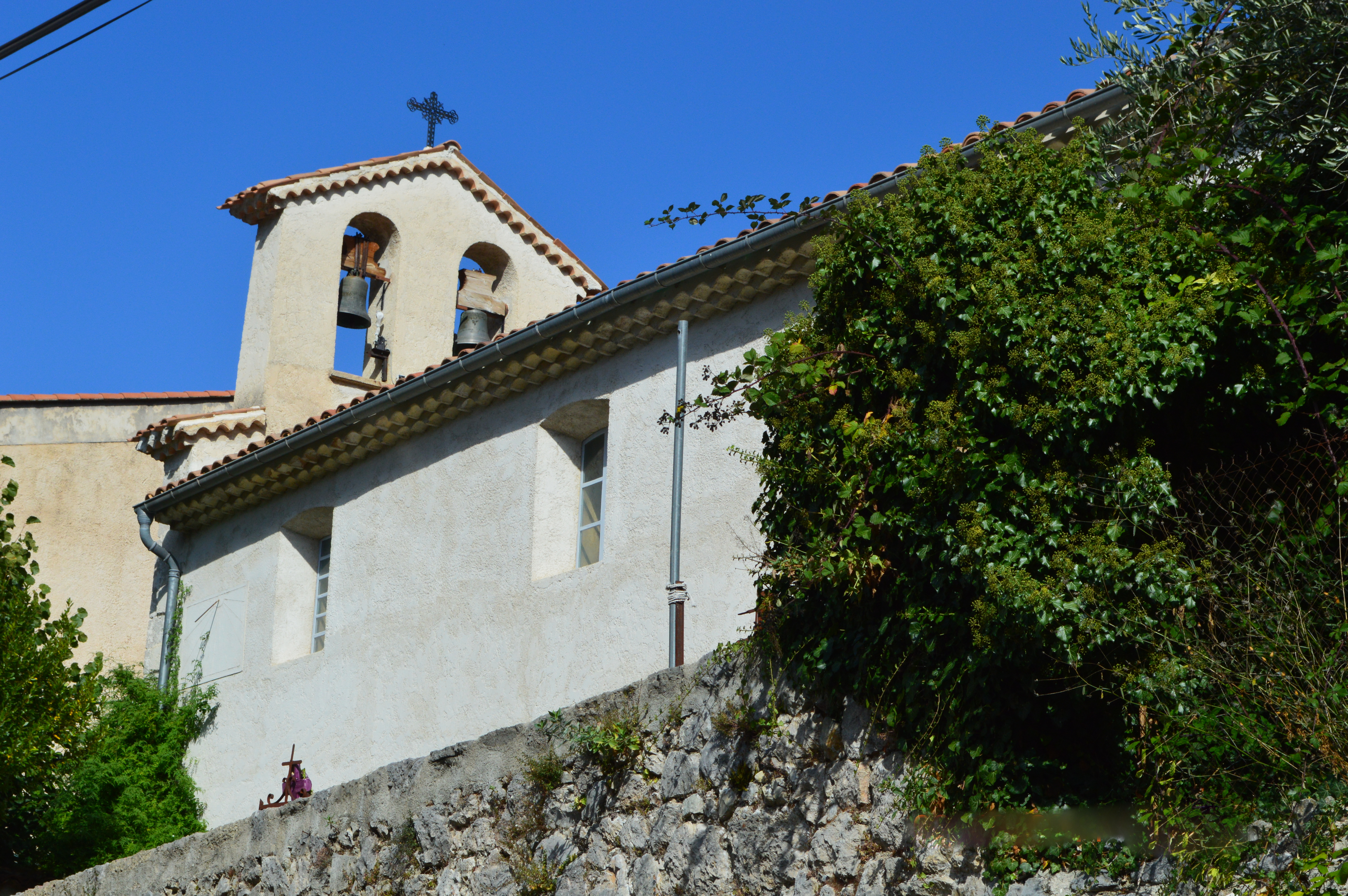
Aiglun Church

== Notable people ==
- Fanny Robiane. Daughter of Joseph Robin, who was mayor of Aiglun in the early 20th century, this French theatre actress died in 1982 at Aiglun, where she retired and she has left a rich archive (autographed books, including by Armand Godoy, Jean-Richard Bloch and others; pictures; clippings, etc.). Her memory is still alive with the people of Aiglun (the Aiglenois) who knew her and plans are underway to honour her. A cultural association sponsored among others by the commune and the General Council launched since 2004 called "Fanny Robiane Encounter" devoted to theatre, poetry, music and other one-time cultural events are scheduled throughout the year. Sometimes these events are carried out in collaboration with the University of Nice.

== See also ==
- Communes of the Alpes-Maritimes department
- Yves Bernard, The Tourist and Cultural Directory of the Alpes-Maritimes and Monaco, p. 149 Publishing Campanile, 1997 (ISBN 978-2-912366-00-9)
