= John Francis Regis =

French Jesuit priest and Roman Catholic saint

Saint John Francis Regis S.J.
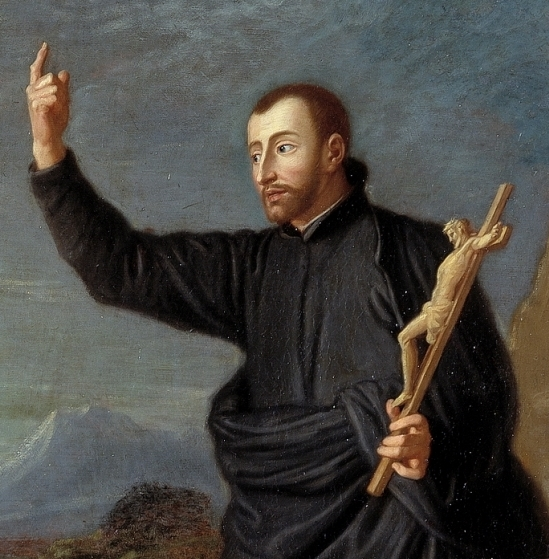
- Saint Francis Regis, SJ Preaching. Michel Ange Houasse. Beginning of the 18th-century. Museo del Prado. Madrid. Spain.

Jesuit missionary, priest, saint
- Born: 31 January 1597; Fontcouverte, Languedoc, France
- Died: 31 December 1640 (aged 43); Lalouvesc, Languedoc, France
- Venerated in: Catholic Church
- Beatified: 18 May 1716, Rome, Papal States by Pope Clement XI
- Canonized: 5 April 1737, Rome, Papal States by Pope Clement XII
- Major shrine: Lalouvesc, France
- Feast: 16 June
- Patronage: Regis University; Regis High School (New York City); Regis Jesuit High School (Aurora, Colorado); lacemakers

John Francis Regis, SJ, commonly known Saint Regis (French: Jean-François Régis; 31 January 1597 – 31 December 1640), was a French Jesuit priest who was canonized in 1737. A tireless preacher and social reformer, Regis is best known for his work with at-risk women and orphans.

== Life ==
Jean-François Régis was born 31 January 1597, in Fontcouverte, Aude, in the Languedoc region of southern France. His father, Jean Régis, had recently been ennobled as a result of service rendered during the Wars of the League. His mother, Marguerite de Cugunhan, was of a noble family. He was educated at the Jesuit College of Béziers. On 8 December 1616, in his nineteenth year, he entered the Jesuit novitiate at Toulouse and he took his vows two years later.

After finishing his course in rhetoric at Cahors, Regis was sent to teach grammar at several colleges: Billom (1619–22), Puy-en-Velay (1625–27), and Auch (1627–28). While he was teaching, he also pursued his studies in philosophy at the scholasticate at Tournon-sur-Rhône . Noted for an intense love of preaching and teaching the Faith, as well as the desire to save souls, Regis began his study of theology at Toulouse in 1628. Less than two years later, in 1630, he was ordained a priest at 31. The following year, having completed his studies, Regis made his tertianship.

Regis was now fully prepared for his lifework and entered upon his apostolic career in the summer of 1631. He was a tireless worker who spent most of his life serving the marginalized. As a newly ordained priest, he worked with bubonic plague victims in Toulouse. From May 1632 until September 1634, his headquarters was at the Jesuit College of Montpellier. Here he labored for the conversion of the Huguenots, visited hospitals, assisted the needy, withdrew from vice wayward women and girls, and preached Catholic doctrine with tireless zeal to children and the poor. Regis is best known for his work with at-risk women and orphans. He established safe houses and found jobs for them. Regis established the Confraternity of the Blessed Sacrament, which organized charitable collections of money and food from the wealthy. He also established several hostels for prostitutes, and helped many become trained lace makers, which provided them with a stable income and an opportunity to avoid the threat of exploitation.

In 1633, Regis went to the Diocese of Viviers at the invitation of the local bishop, Monsignor Louis II de la Baume de Suze, giving missions throughout the diocese. From 1633 to 1640 he evangelized more than fifty districts in le Vivarais, le Forez, and le Velay. Regis labored diligently on behalf of both priests and laypersons. His preaching style was said to have been simple and direct. He appealed to the uneducated peasantry and numerous conversions resulted.

Regis's labors reaped a harvest of conversions. However, his boldness – perceived as arrogance in some cases – led to a conflict with certain other priests, a period of tension with the local bishop, and even threats of violence from those whose vices he condemned. Although he longed to devote himself to the conversion of the indigenous inhabitants of Canada, he remained in France all his life.

Regis walked from town to town, in rough mountainous areas where travel was difficult, especially in the winter. He died of pneumonia at age forty-three on 31 December 1640, at Lalouvesc (Ardèche).

== Veneration ==
John Francis Regis was beatified by Pope Clement XI on 18 May 1716, and canonized by Pope Clement XII on 5 April 1737.

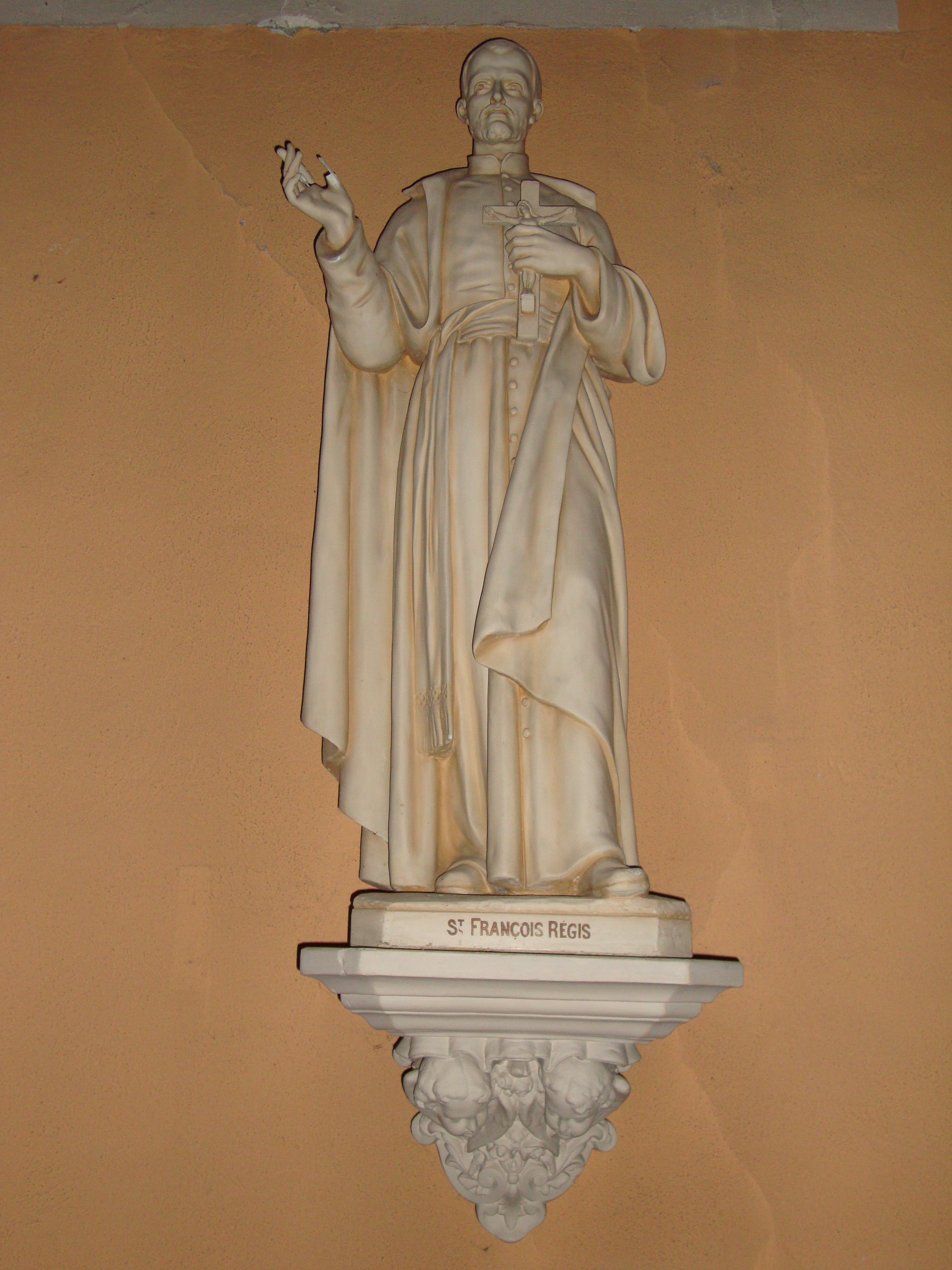
Statue of St.François Regis, St. Martin-de-Valamas, Ardèche

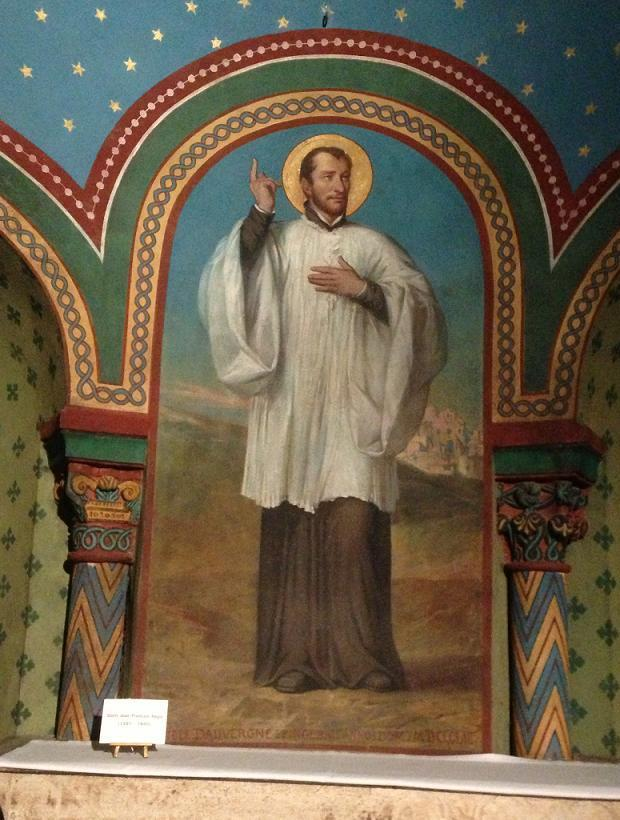
The altar dedicated to Saint John Francis Regis in the Cathédrale Notre-Dame du Puy

=== Iconography ===
On the occasion of his canonization in 1737, the death of the Saint was represented in a large and famous painting by Jacopo Zoboli, preserved in the sacristy of the Church of the Gesù in Rome.

=== Patronage ===
John Francis Regis is the patron saint of lacemakers, medical social workers, and illegitimate children.

== Legacy ==
Pope Gregory XVI wrote to François-René Boussen, Bishop of Bruges in Belgium, on 28 May 1845, commending the latter's diocese for an initiative undertaken under the patronage of Regis, whereby couples who were living together (i poveri concubinari) were encouraged to consider entering into a sacramental Catholic marriage. The Pope referred to a similar initiative in what was then the Diocese of Malines.

In a 1997 letter to the Bishop of Viviers, Pope John Paul II commemorated the fourth centenary of St. John Francis Regis' birth, honoring him as a "lofty figure of holiness" and an example for the Church in the modern world.

Today, Regis' name lives on across the world. There are lakes, mountains, hotels, apartment complexes, swimming pools, and streets with his namesake.

Parishes are dedicated to St. John Francis Regis in Arnaudville, Louisiana; Hollywood, Maryland; and Kansas City, Missouri.

Regis University, located in Colorado, along with the Regis Campus of Saint Ignatius' College, Riverview, are both named in his honor, as well as numerous elementary and high schools worldwide, including Regis High School (New York City), Regis School of the Sacred Heart (Houston, Texas), Regis High School (Stayton, Oregon), Regis High School (Eau Claire, Wisconsin) and Regis Jesuit High School (Aurora, Colorado).

St. Regis Mohawk Reservation, where a Roman Catholic church named for him stands, is also named in his honor, due to his respect for the native inhabitants of North America.

The Jesuit mission at Conewago, Pennsylvania, was named after him.

== See also ==
- List of Catholic saints

== Bibliography ==
- Holland, Robert E. (1922). The Life of Saint John Francis Regis of the Society of Jesus. Chicago, Illinois: Loyola University Press. ISBN 9781117653297. OCLC 1343407.
- Hoever, Hugo H. (1955). Lives of the saints: for every day of the year: in accord with the norms and principles of the new Roman calendar (New rev. ed.). New York: Catholic Book Pub. Co. ISBN 0899428703. OCLC 24886449.
