= Fontcouverte, Aude =

Commune in Occitanie, France

Fontcouverte
- Commune
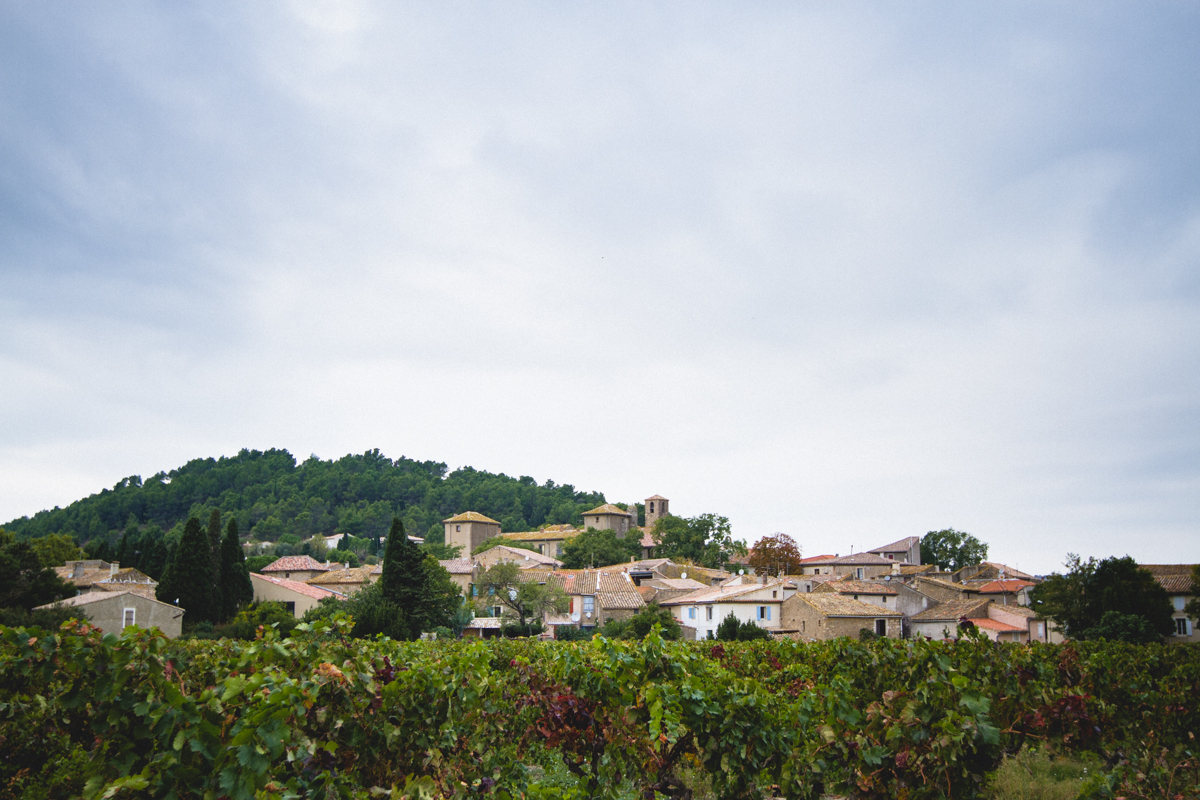
- A general view of Fontcouverte

- Coat of arms
- Location of Fontcouverte
- Location within France Location within Occitanie
- Coordinates: 43°10′08″N 2°41′22″E
- Country: France
- Region: Occitania
- Department: Aude
- Arrondissement: Narbonne
- Canton: Les Corbières
- Intercommunality: Région Lézignanaise, Corbières et Minervois

Government
  - Mayor (2020–2026): Jacques Conties
- Area^{1}: 9.97 km^{2} (3.85 sq mi)
- Elevation: 65 m (213 ft)
- Highest elevation: 189 m (620 ft)
- Lowest elevation: 62 m (203 ft)
- Population (2023): 575
  - Density: 57.7/km^{2} (149/sq mi)
- Time zone: UTC+01:00 (CET)
  - Summer (DST): UTC+02:00 (CEST)
- INSEE/Postal code: 11148 /11700
- ^{1} French Land Register data, which excludes lakes, ponds, glaciers > 1 km^{2} (0.386 sq mi or 247 acres) and river estuaries.

Fontcouverte (French pronunciation: [fɔ̃kuvɛʁt]; Occitan: Fontcobèrta) is a commune in the Aude department in southern France.

== Population ==
Historical population
Year	Pop.	±% p.a.
1968	397	—
1975	336	−2.36%
1982	328	−0.34%
1990	333	+0.19%
1999	424	+2.72%
2007	535	+2.95%
2012	518	−0.64%
2017	546	+1.06%
2023	575	+0.87%
Source: INSEE

== Sights ==
- Monument Saint Régis
- Fountain on the Place de la Révolution, built in the late 19th century
- A column 4.40 m high with a statue of a woman symbolizing agriculture
- Montagne d'Alaric

== See also ==
- Corbières AOC
- Communes of the Aude department
