= Le Mas =

Commune in Provence-Alpes-Côte d'Azur, France

- Commune
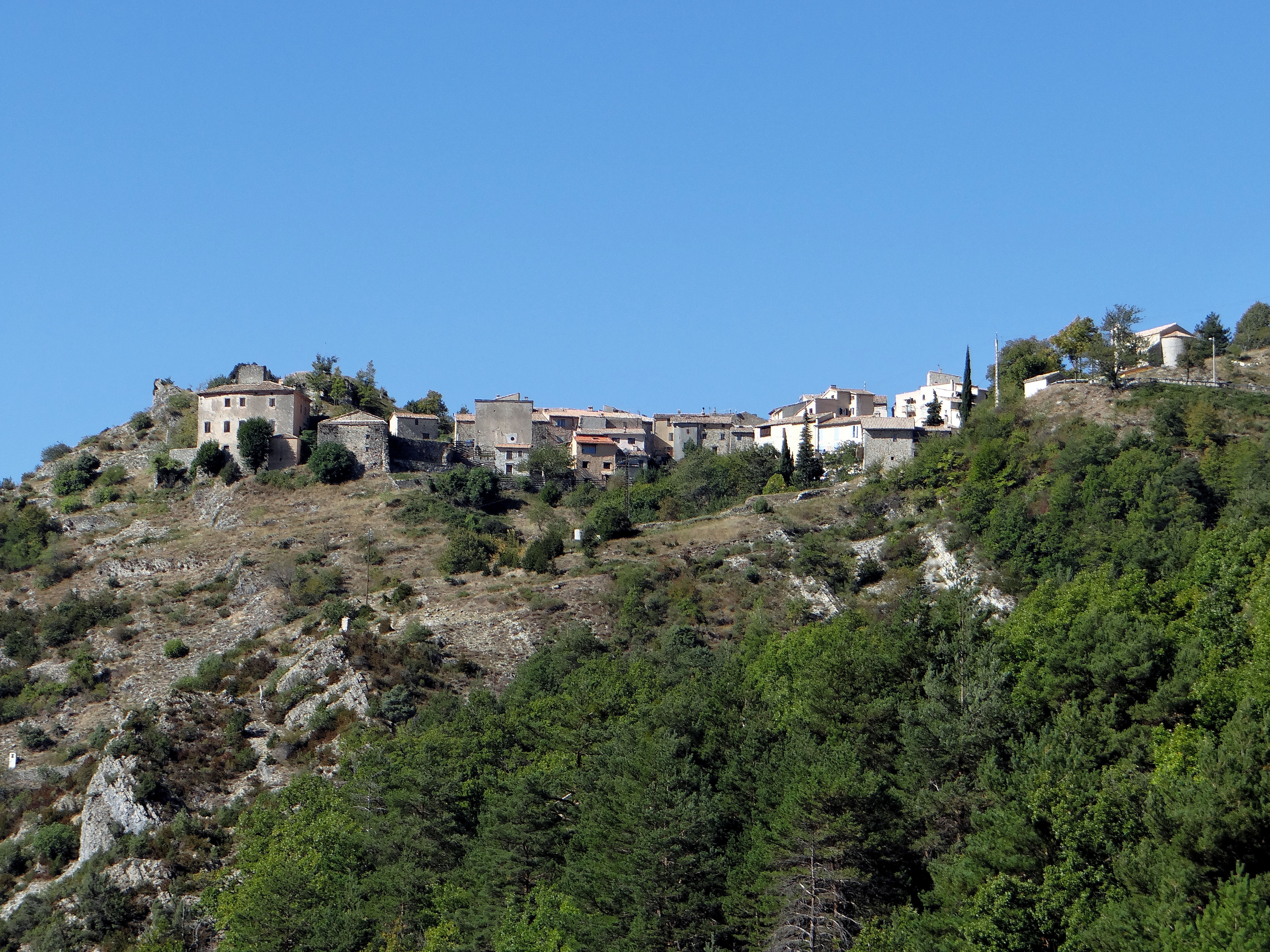
- A general view of the village

- Coat of arms
- Location of Le Mas
- Location within France Location within Provence-Alpes-Côte d'Azur
- Coordinates: 43°50′38″N 6°51′33″E
- Country: France
- Region: Provence-Alpes-Côte d'Azur
- Department: Alpes-Maritimes
- Arrondissement: Grasse
- Canton: Grasse-1
- Intercommunality: CA Pays de Grasse

Government
  - Mayor (2026–32): Ludovic Sanchez-Zampolini
- Area^{1}: 32.15 km^{2} (12.41 sq mi)
- Highest elevation: 1,689 m (5,541 ft)
- Lowest elevation: 440 m (1,440 ft)
- Population (2023): 97
  - Density: 3.0/km^{2} (7.8/sq mi)
- Time zone: UTC+01:00 (CET)
  - Summer (DST): UTC+02:00 (CEST)
- INSEE/Postal code: 06081 /06910
- ^{1} French Land Register data, which excludes lakes, ponds, glaciers > 1 km^{2} (0.386 sq mi or 247 acres) and river estuaries.

Le Mas (Occitan: Lo Mas) is a commune in the Alpes-Maritimes department in the Provence-Alpes-Côte d'Azur region of South-eastern France.

== Geography ==
Le Mas is located some 45 km north-west of Nice and 32 km east of Castellane in a direct line. Access to the commune is by road D10 which branches from the D5 road on the western border of the commune and passes through the length of the commune through the village before continuing to Aiglun in the east. The D110 branches from the D10 in the west of the commune and passes along the river valley to rejoin the D10 east of the village. The commune is alpine in nature with high mountains and alpine valleys throughout.

The Gironde river flows through the commune from west to east to join the Estéron which forms the eastern border of the commune as it flows south then east joining the Var at Saint-Martin-du-Var. Numerous tributaries feed the Gironde in the commune.

=== Neighbouring communes and villages ===
Source:

== History ==
Isnard, from the House of Grasse, Commander of St. John of Jerusalem, Prior of Capua, Grand Seneschal of Provence, in recognition of his services received the lands of Mas and Aiglun from Queen Jeanne on 7 July 1348. He donated the land of Aiglun to his cousin Pons of Ferres on 18 May 1349. The fief of Mas passed down to Bertrand II de Grasse. The Grasse family lost the lordship of Mas at the time of the separation of Nice and it subsequently remained with the Counts of Provence.

In 1713 the Treaty of Utrecht provided that Ubaye and its dependencies, formerly under the Kingdom of Piedmont-Sardinia, were exchanged for the French areas in the Susa Valley so that the boundary followed the line of the watershed. But the overlapping of territories inherited from history remained: Entraunes and Saint-Martin-d'Entraunes were dependent on Barcelonnette but are in the Var valley while the Piedmontese side upstream of Guillaumes was already French. The Kingdoms of France and Piedmont both claimed them. In addition, in the Estéron Valley the right bank of the Var was Piedmontese which created a tongue of land jutting out into French Provence. In Haut-Var it was ultimately the line of the watershed which prevailed. To provide compensation to France and to reduce the irregularity of the border, the community of Mas was ceded to France in 1718.

For more historical information (in French) click here.

=== Heraldry ===
Arms of Le Mas	The official status of the blazon remains to be determined. Blazon: Azure, a house Argent posed on a hillock Vert; in chief parti per pale, at 1 Gules charged with a cross Argent, at 2 Azure charged with 3 fleurs-de-lis Or 2 and 1.

== Administration ==
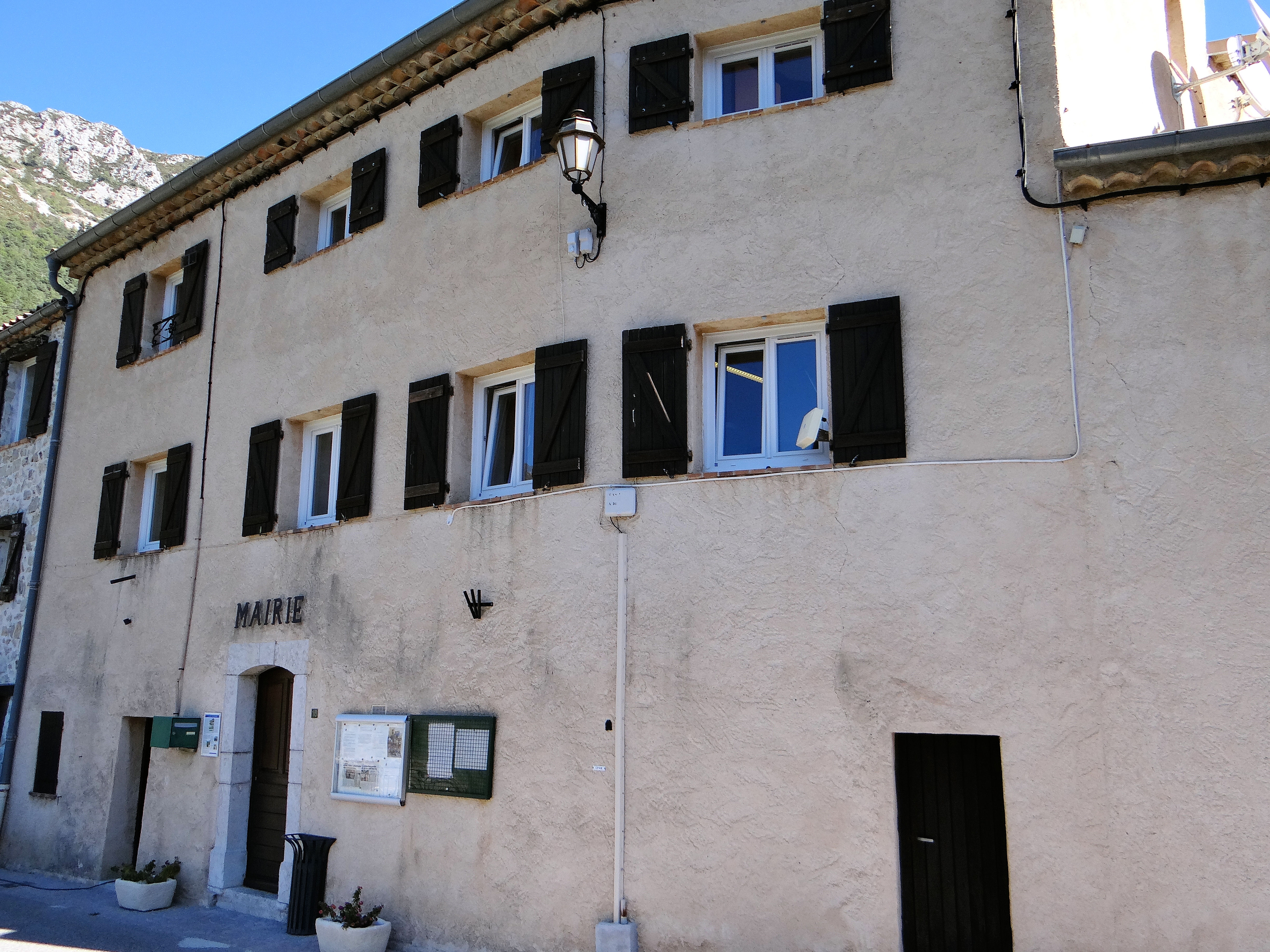
The Town Hall

List of Successive Mayors

From	To	Name	Party
2001	2007 (died in office)	Marcel Rebuffel	
2006	2008	Frédéric Castellano	DVD
2008	2020	Fabrice Lachenmaier	PRG
2020	incumbent	Ludovic Sanchez	

== Demography ==
The inhabitants of the commune are known as Massois, Massoises, or Massoinques in French.

Historical population

Year	Pop.	±% p.a.
1793	467	—
1821	460	−0.05%
1846	512	+0.43%
1872	387	−1.07%
1901	257	−1.40%
1911	165	−4.33%
1921	130	−2.36%
1931	67	−6.41%
1946	55	−1.31%
1954	46	−2.21%

Year	Pop.	±% p.a.
1962	41	−1.43%
1968	46	+1.94%
1975	25	−8.34%
1982	120	+25.12%
1990	108	−1.31%
1999	136	+2.59%
2007	129	−0.66%
2012	171	+5.80%
2017	155	−1.95%
2023	97	−7.51%

Source: EHESS and INSEE

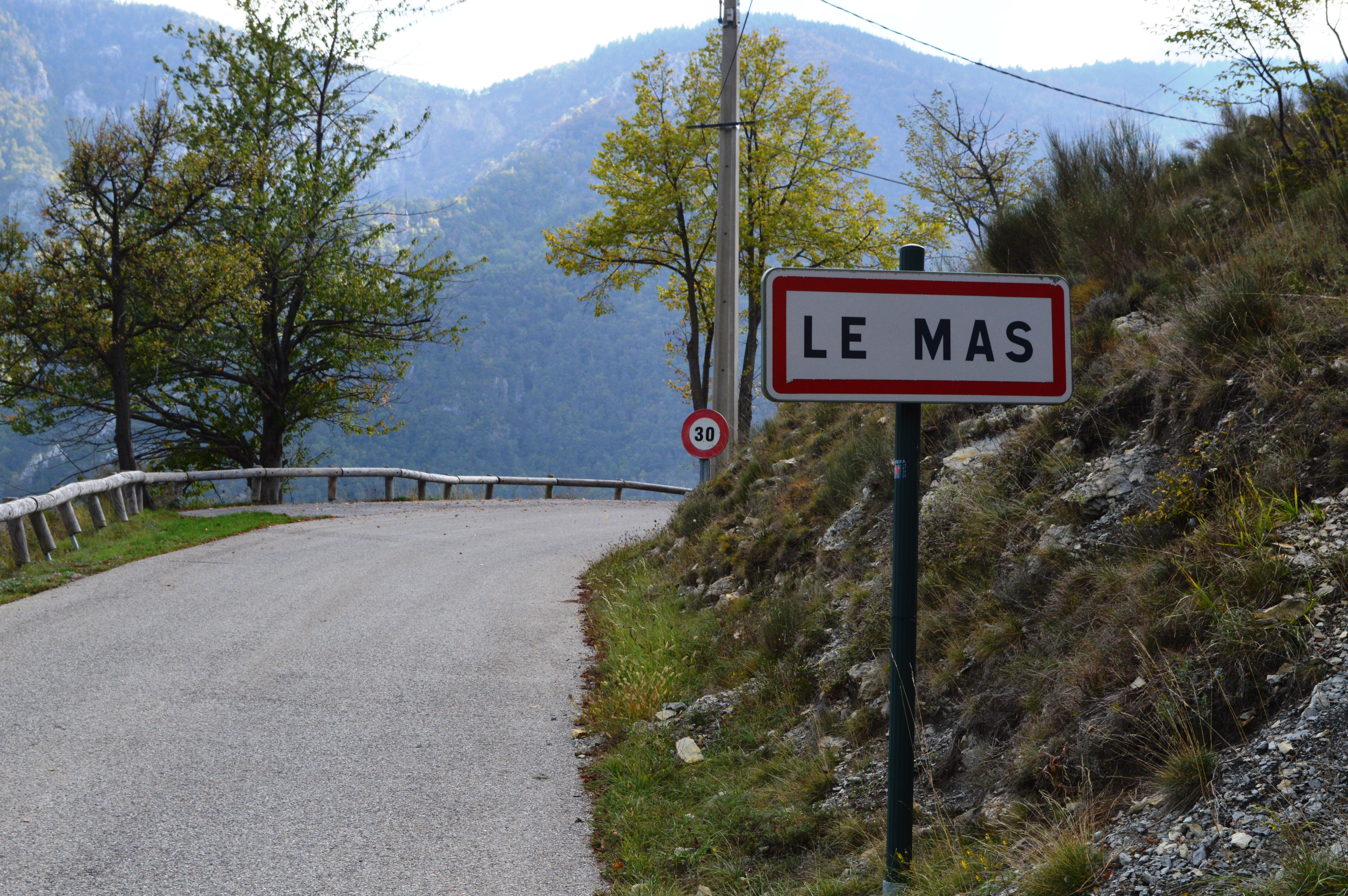
The entry to Le Mas

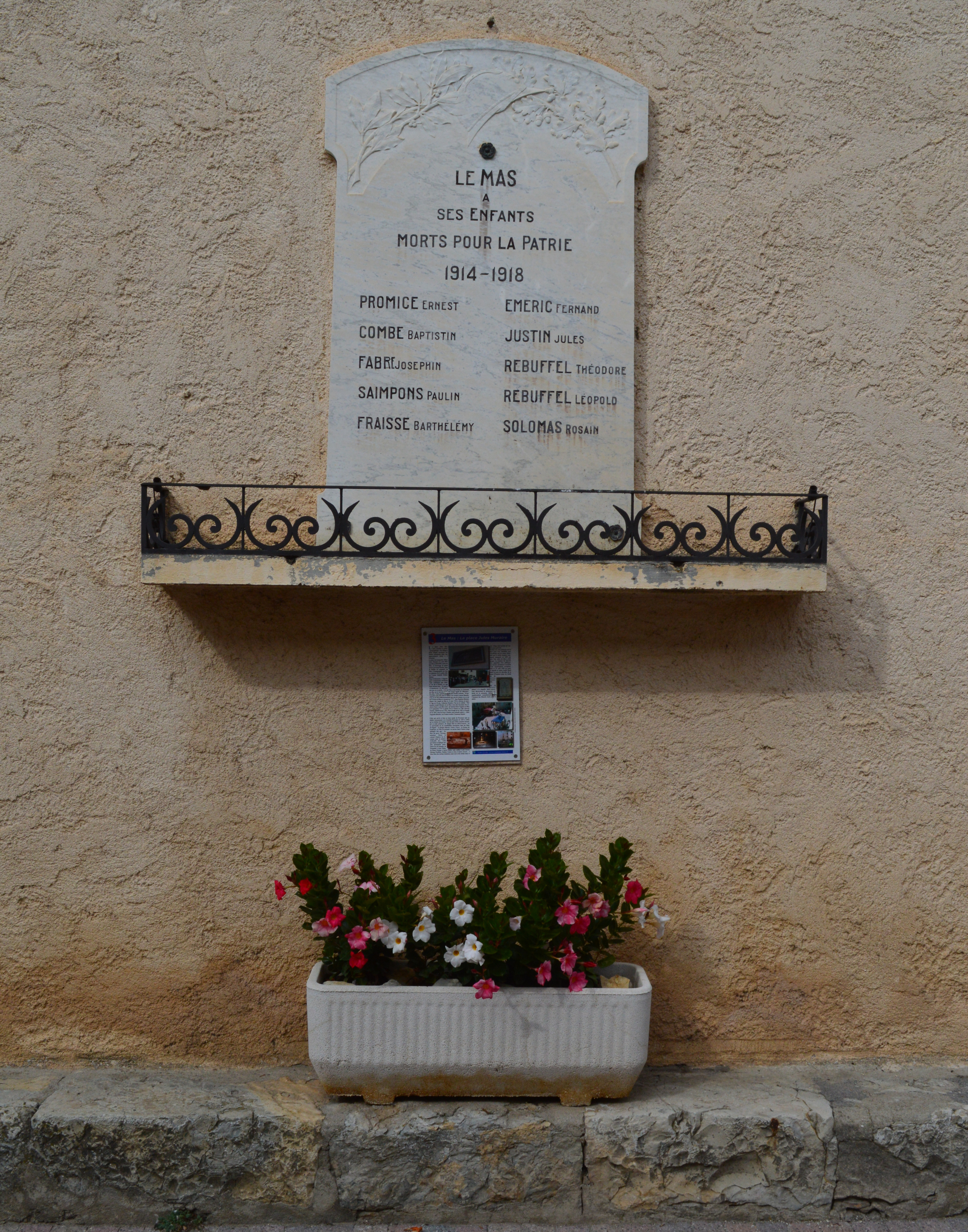
Le Mas War Memorial

== Culture and heritage ==
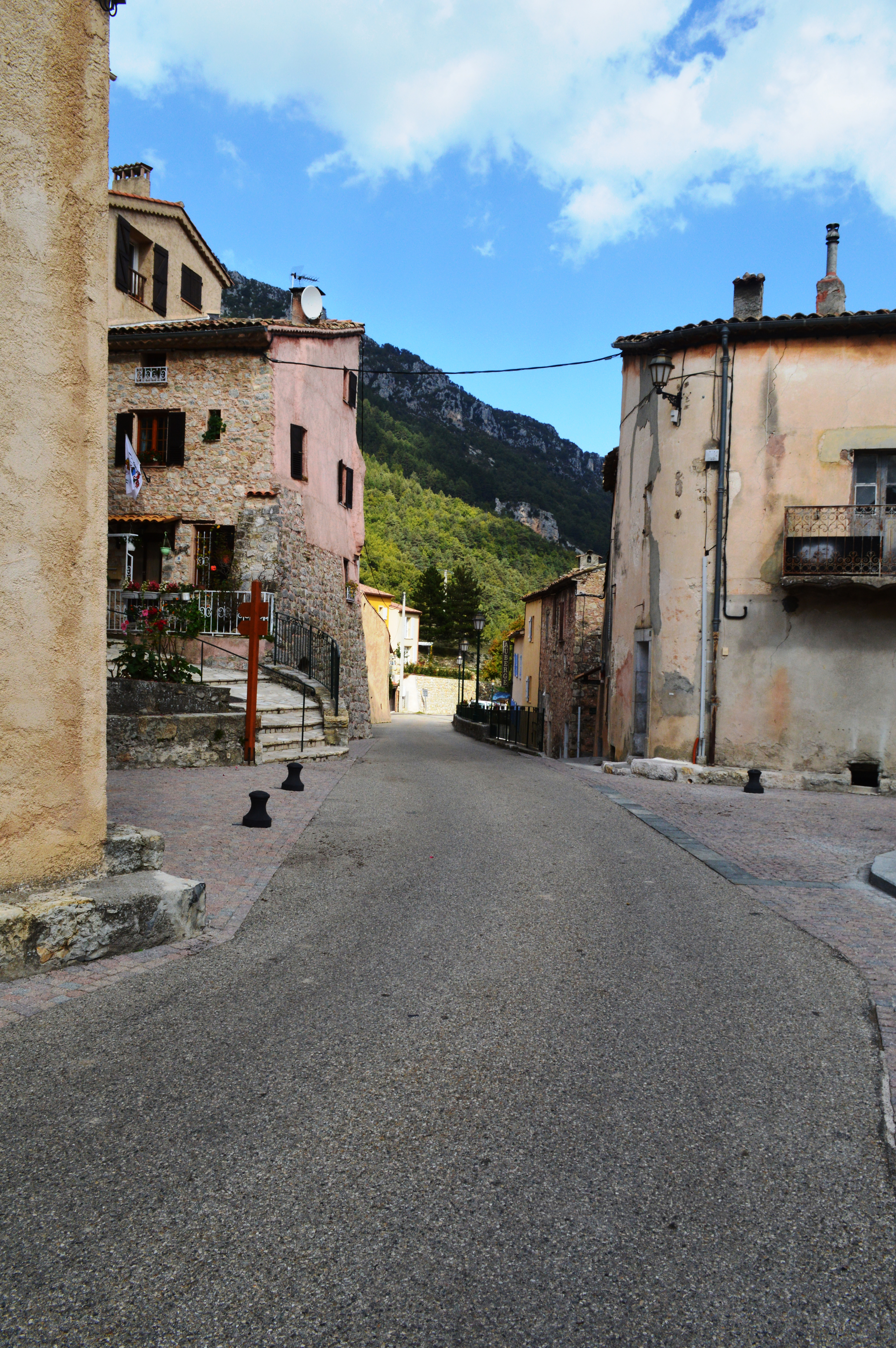
A street in Le Mas

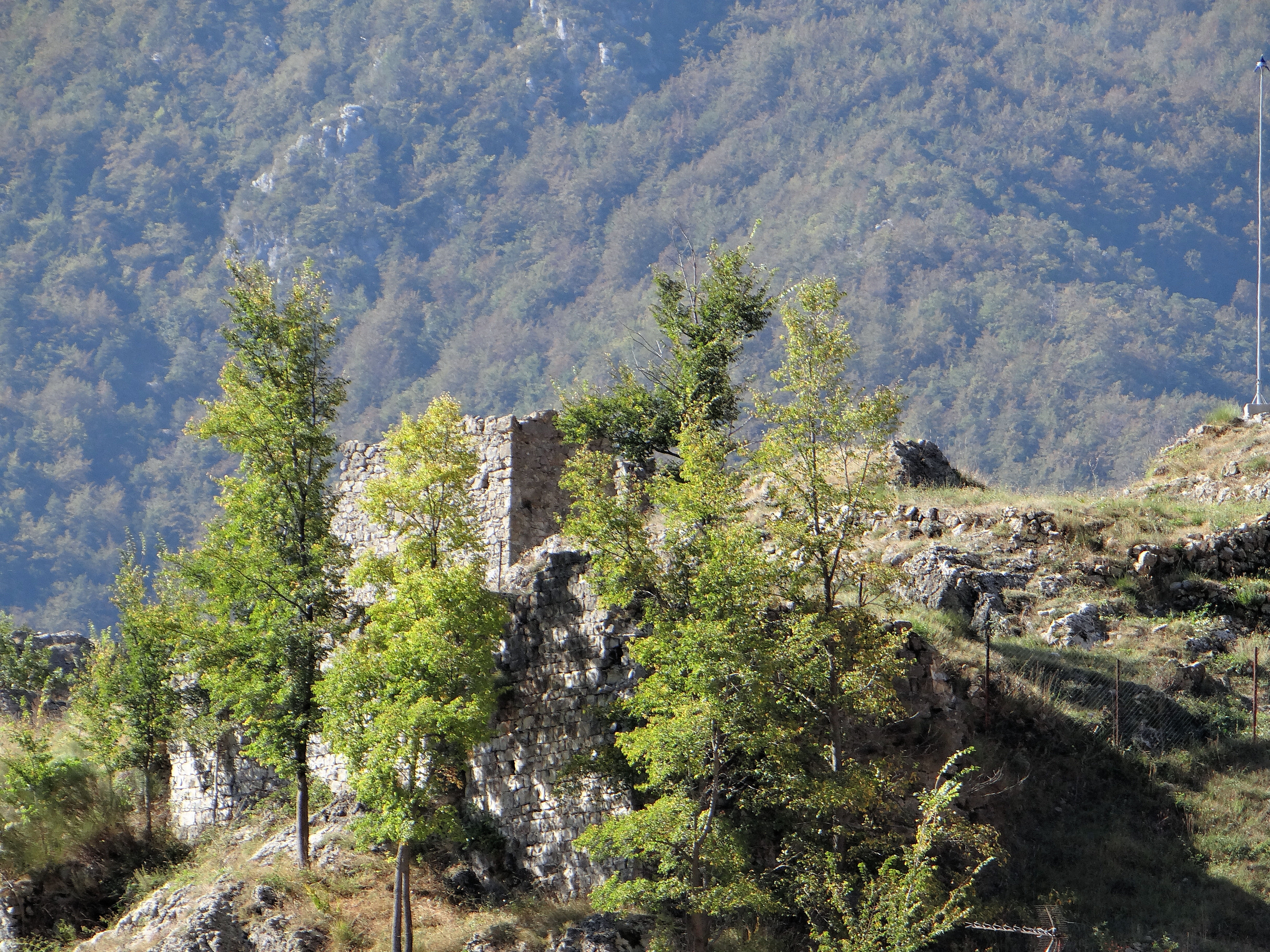
Remains of the old Chateau

=== Civil heritage ===
- The remains of a Chateau from the 11th century
- A small classical chateau
- A Mill to the south of the village
- The Arboretum du Sarroudier

=== Religious heritage ===
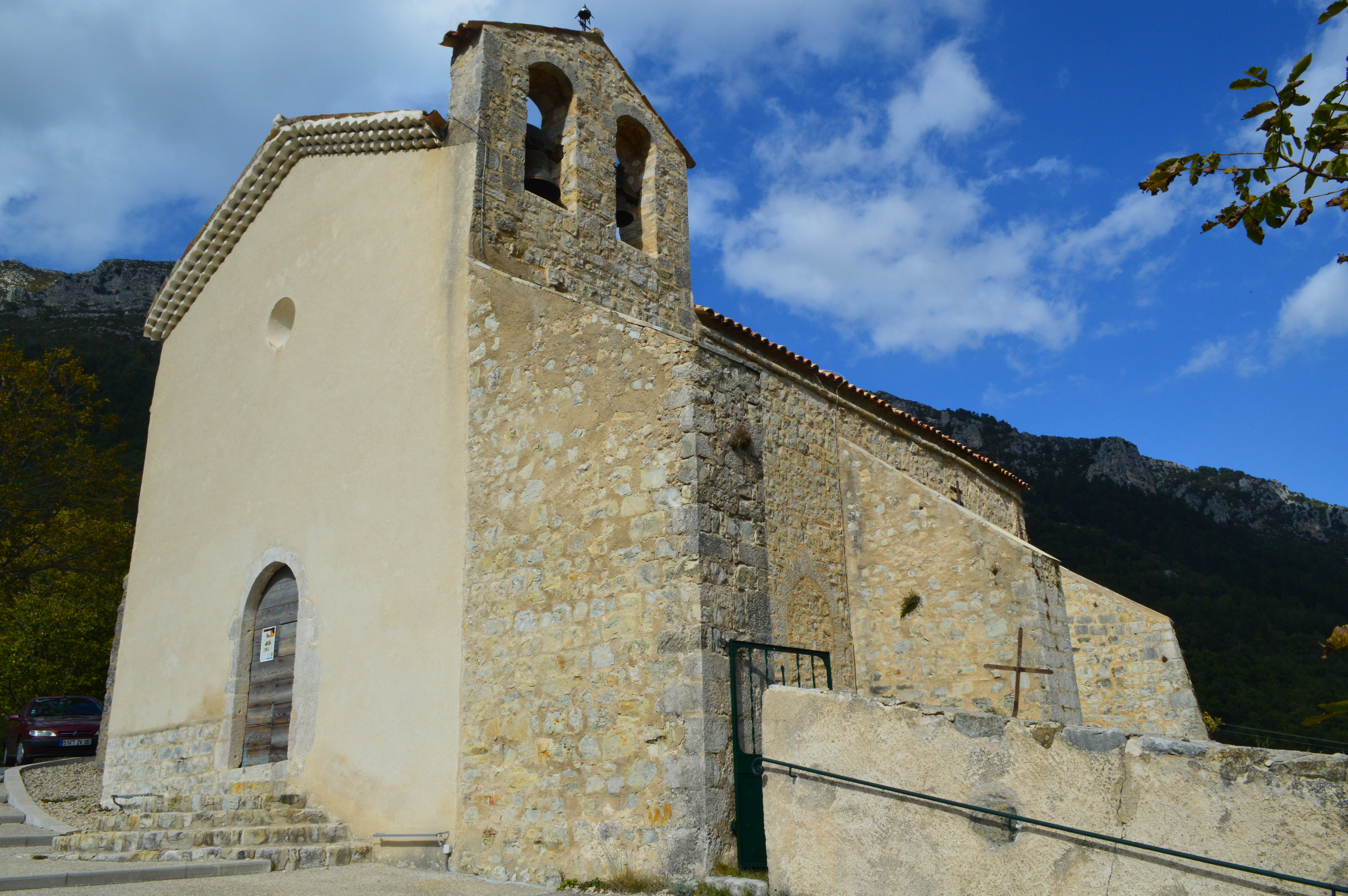
The Church of Notre-Dame

The Church of Notre-Dame (12th century) is registered as an historical monument The Church contains two items that are registered as historical objects:

- A Reliquary of Saint Arnoux (16th century)
- A Bust-Reliquary of Saint Arnoux (16th century)

Other religious sites of interest

- The Chapel of Saint Arnoux
- The Chapel of the White Penitents (Now converted to a private residence)
- The Chapel of Saint Sebastian (Now private)
- The Hamlet of Sausses with the Chapel of Saint Sauveur and the Oratory of Saint Aman

Le Mas Photo Gallery

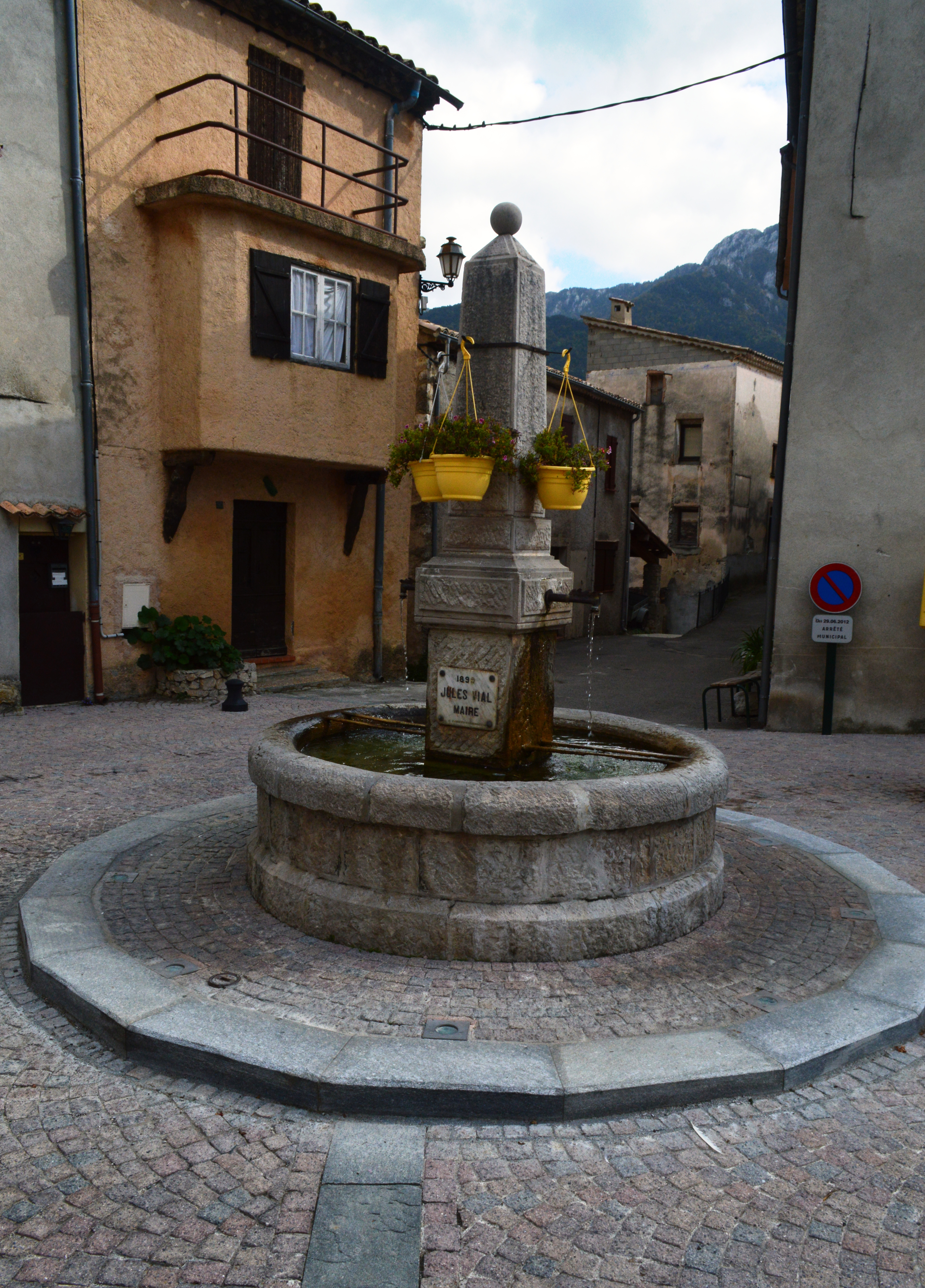
Le Mas Fountain

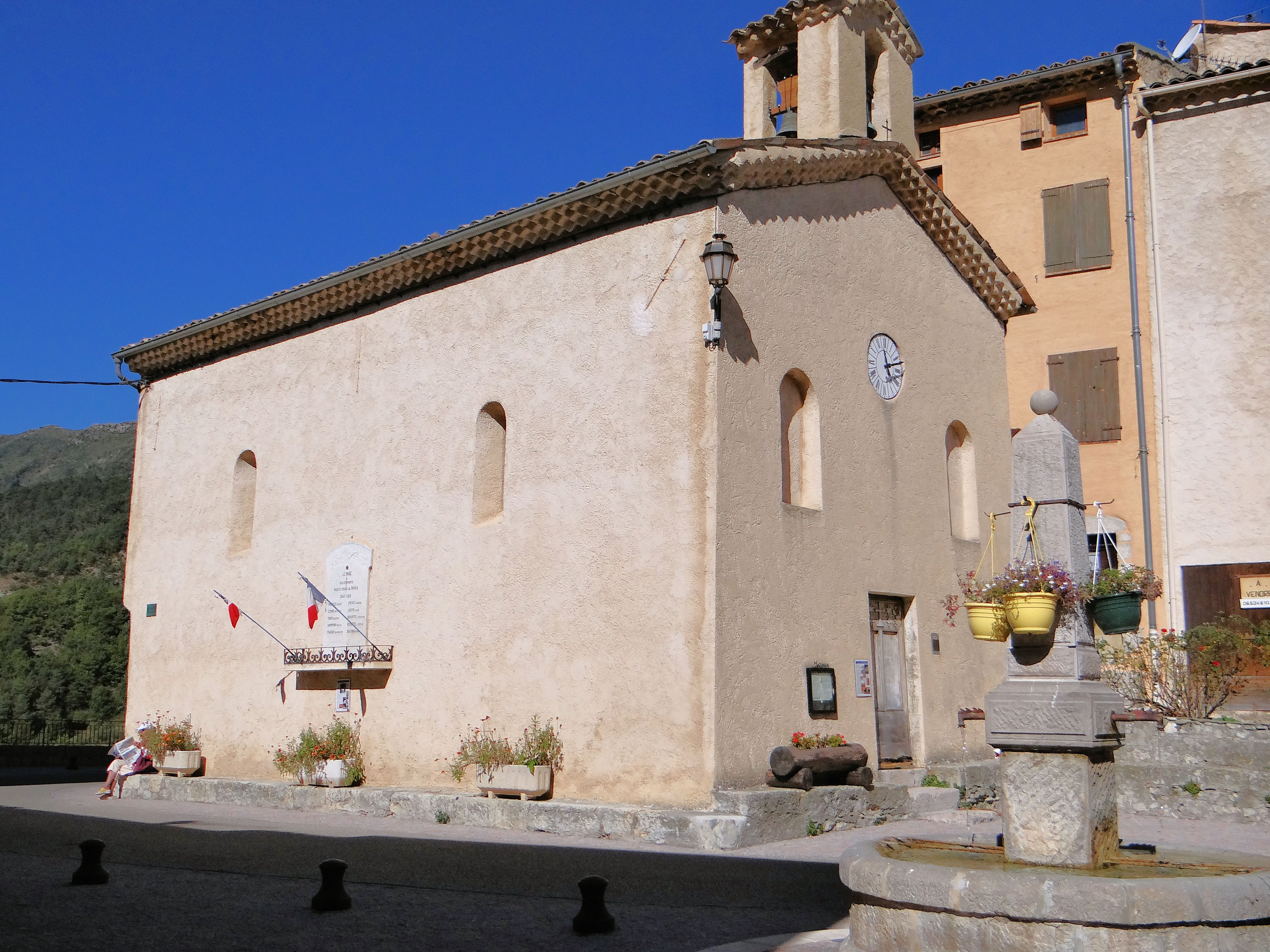
The Chapel of Saint-Arnoux

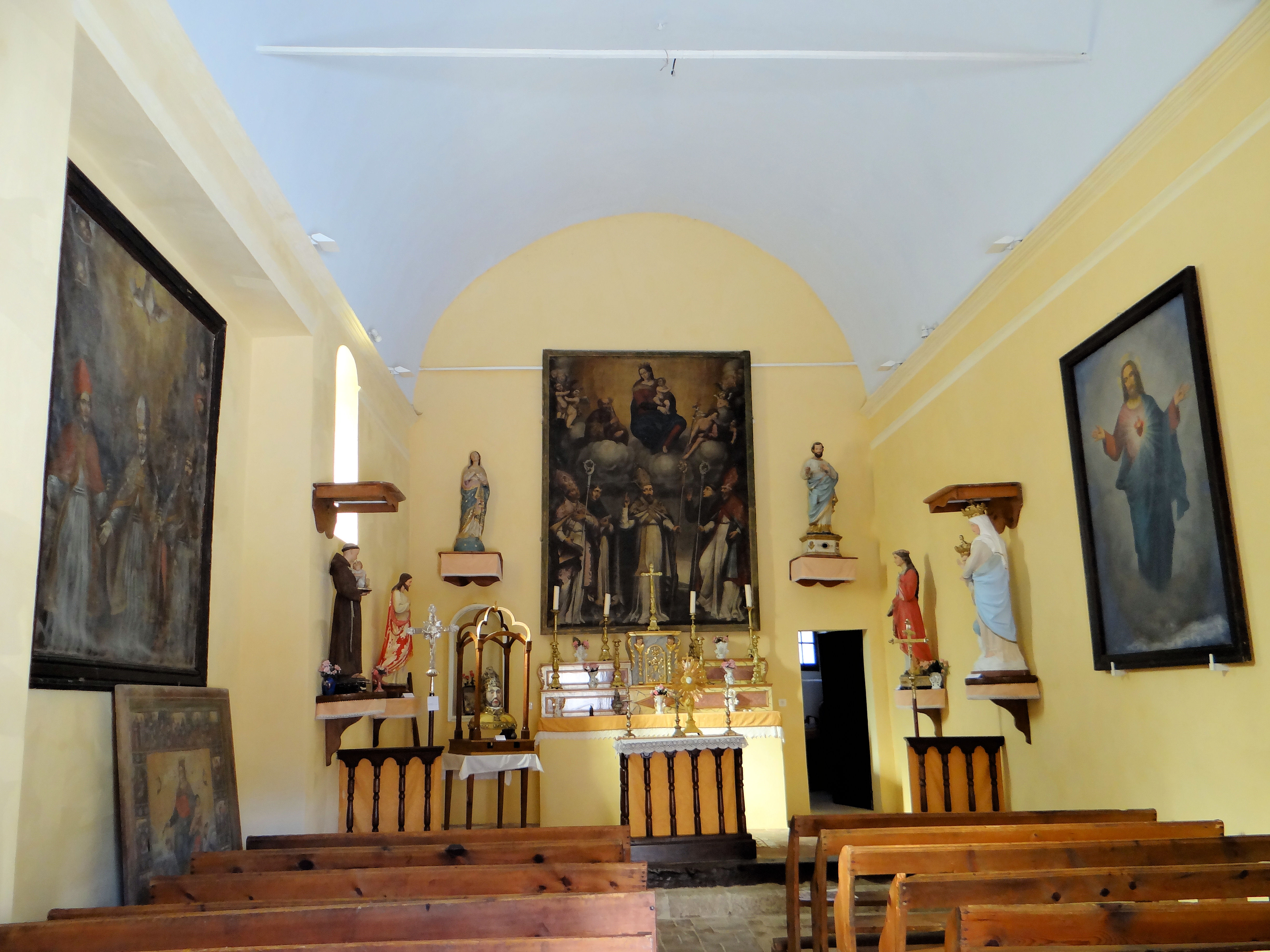
The Chapel of Saint-Arnoux interior

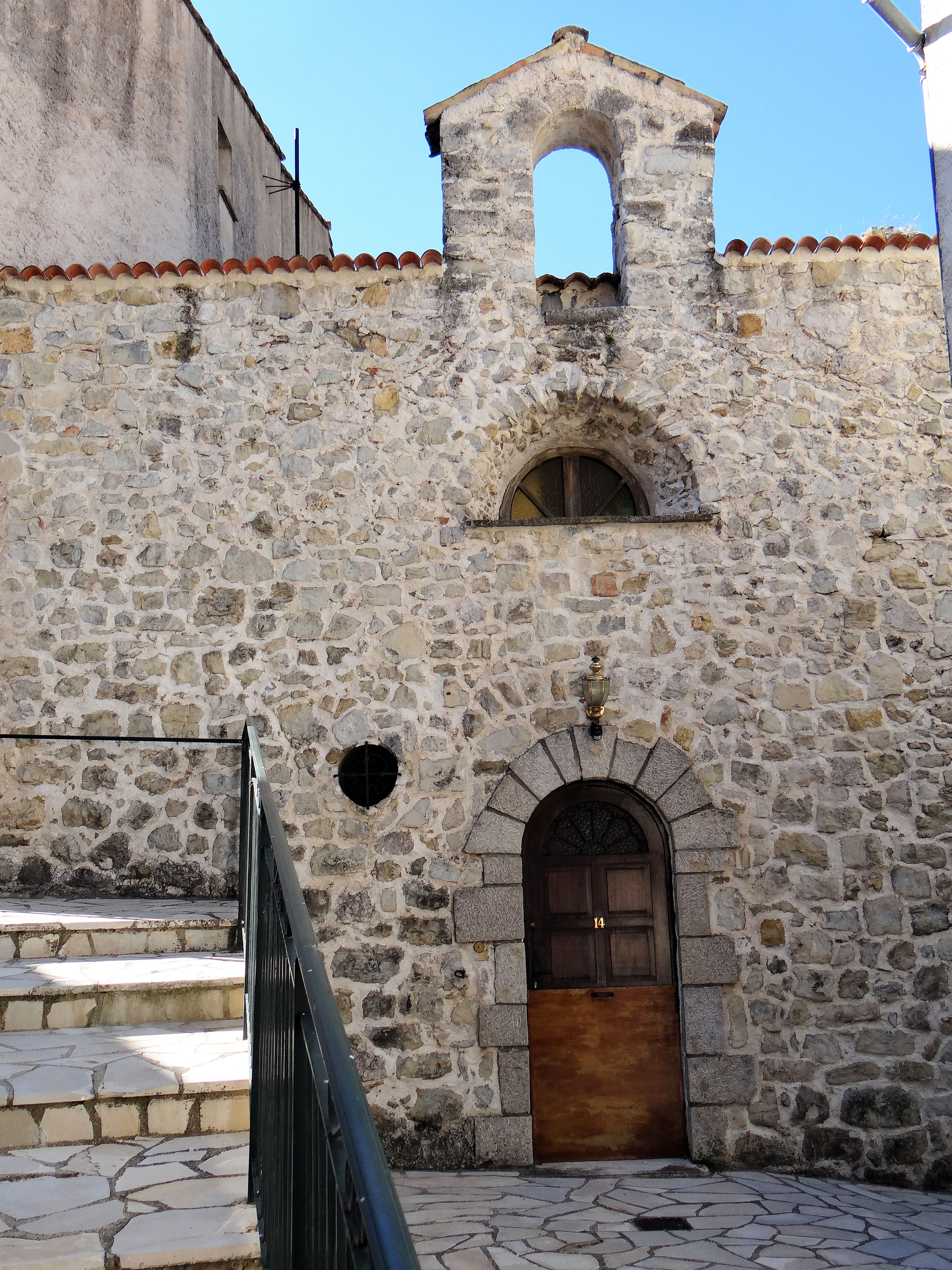
The old Chapel of the White Penitents

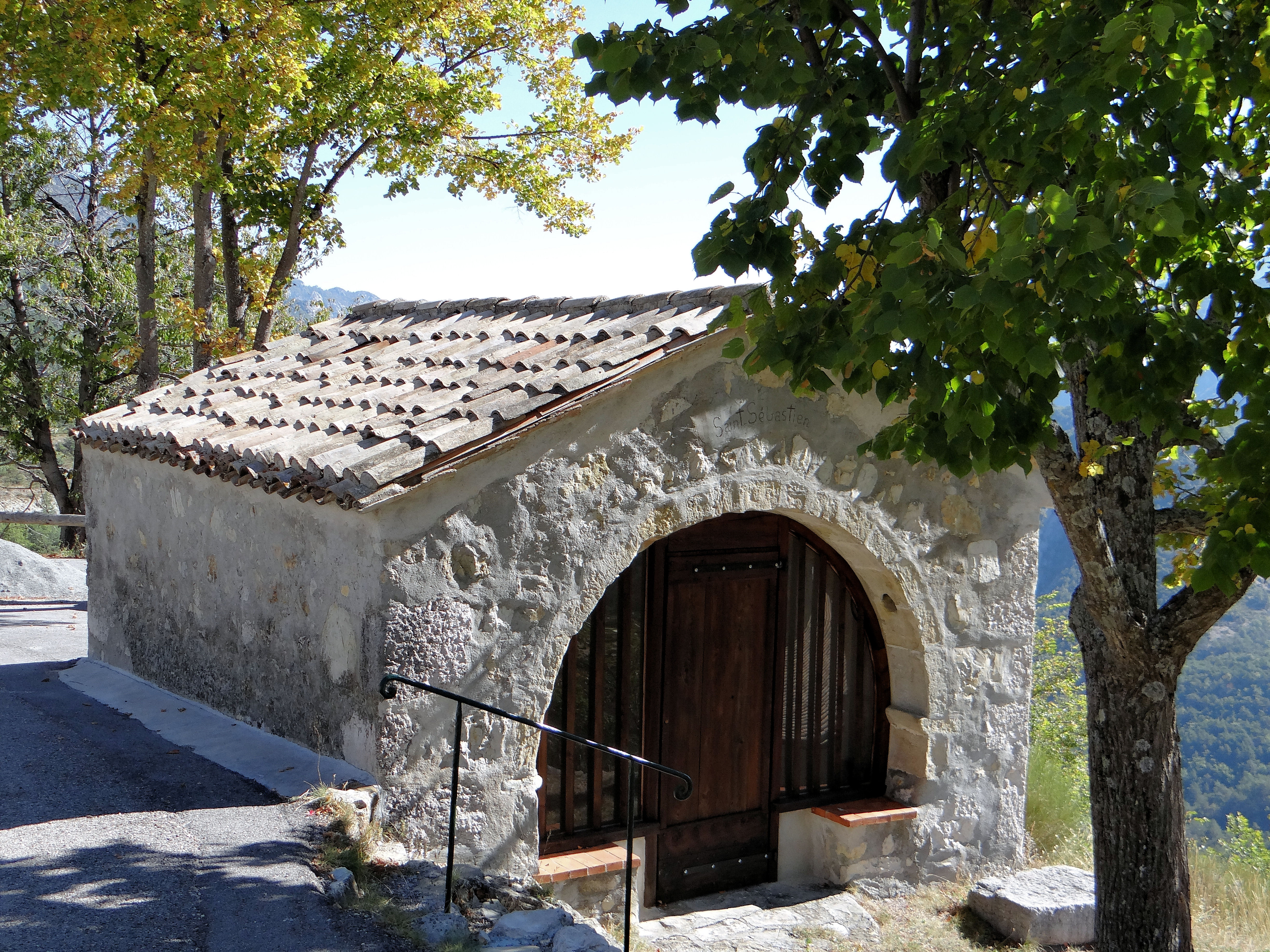
The Chapel of Saint Sebastian

== See also ==
- Communes of the Alpes-Maritimes department

=== Bibliography ===
- Philippe de Beauchamp, The Misunderstood High Country. Villages & isolated hamlets of Alpes-Maritimes, p. 137, Éditions Serre, Nice, 1989 ISBN 978-2-86410-131-4; p. 159

=== External links ===
- Le Mas on Géoportail, National Geographic Institute (IGN) website (in French)
- Mas on the 1750 Cassini Map
