= Jardin Royal (Toulouse) =

Garden in France

Coordinates: 43.36°N 1.27°E

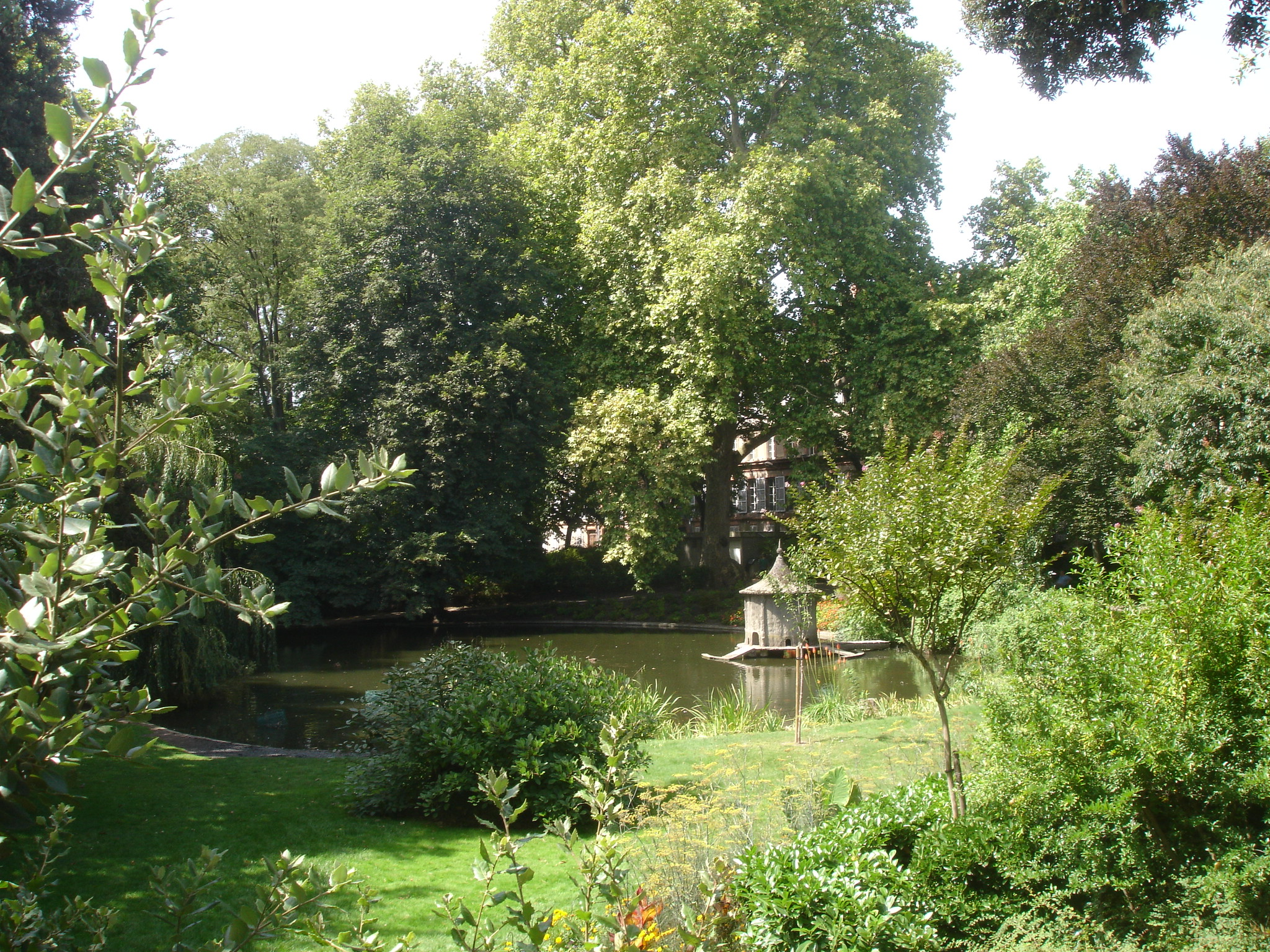
The Jardin Royal lake with its duck house

The Jardin Royal (Royal Garden) is a public park in the French city of Toulouse. Created in 1754 and re-landscaped in the English style in the 1860s, it is the oldest park in the city and has been designated by the French Ministry of Culture as a "Jardin remarquable" (notable garden). It is located in the southeast area of Toulouse with its main entrance on the corner of Rue Ozenne and Allée Jules Guesde.

== History ==
The park was created as part of a major urban renewal project for Toulouse designed in 1751 by the economist and urbanist Louis de Mondran (1699–1792). The project involved demolishing a large area of dilapidated buildings and slums to create a network of interconnected esplanades, parks, plazas, and embankments. A central part of the plan was to build broad tree-lined avenues radiating from an oval hub. One of the avenues led to what would become the Jardin Royal. The oval hub itself would become another park, now known as the Grand Rond.

Although not all of de Mondran's plan was implemented, the Jardin Royal was created in 1754. During the French Revolution, its name was changed to the "Park Public", and the two names continued to fluctuate over the next 130 years depending on the political situation in France. However, its name was finalised as "Jardin Royal" in 1886 following a decree by the Toulouse City Council.

In the early 19th century the Jardin Royal was also the site of a forestry school. From 1861 to 1863, during the height of the Second French Empire, the park was completely re-landscaped in the English style. It underwent a restoration project in 2016 which maintained the English style but with new plantings and park furniture. The project was completed in November 2018.

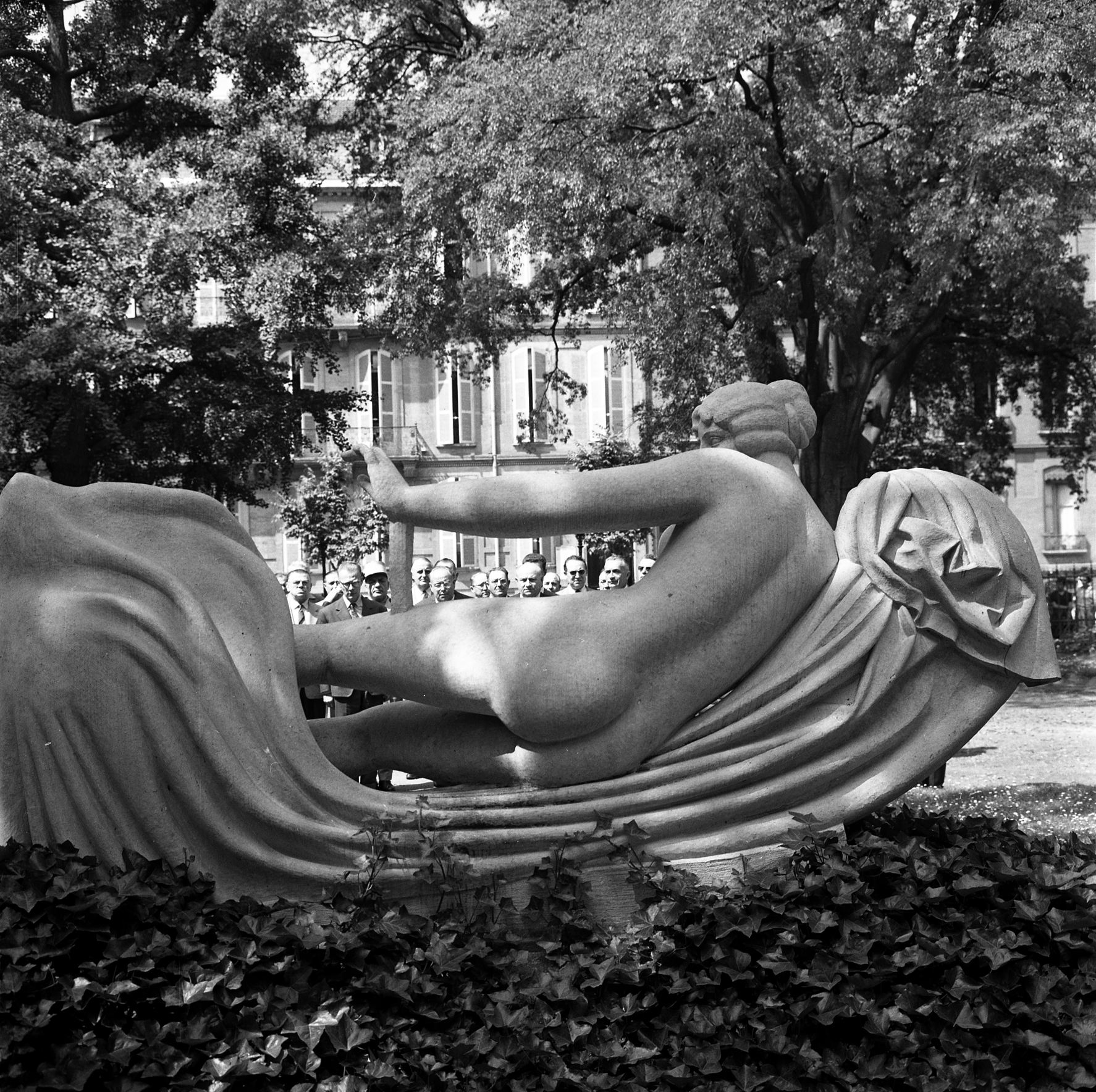
La Gloire de l'Aviation in the Jardin Royal photographed in 1961 during a wreath-laying led by Didier Daurat

== Features ==
The Jardin Royal encompasses 1.7 hectares with lawns, winding paths and a footbridge flanked by a large Ginkgo biloba tree that leads to the Grand Rond park. At its centre is a lake with a duck house and a rustic bridge at one end. The park contains several species of trees that are relatively rare to the area —cedar of Lebanon, Himalayan cedar, Virginia tulip tree, Osage orange, and American copalme—some of them 200 years old.

The park has several statues and sculptures including a statue of The Little Prince in memory of Antoine de Saint-Exupéry and one of the composer Déodat de Séverac sculpted by Auguste Guénot (1882–1966). La Gloire de l'Aviation, a monument to French aviation pioneers sculpted in marble by Aristide Maillol stood in the park from 1948 until 1993 when it was removed after being damaged by repeated vandalism. An abstract steel sculpture by Theodoulos Gregoriou commemorating Jean Mermoz and the pilots of the Aéropostale was erected in its place in 2001.

The Jardin Royal has been designated by the French Ministry of Culture as a "Jardin remarquable" (notable garden) since 2013. The designation is given to French gardens of particular cultural, historic, aesthetic or botanical interest.

== See also ==
- List of botanical gardens in France
- Two other gardens in Toulouse:
  - Jardin des Plantes
  - Jardin botanique Henri Gaussen
