= Jardin des Plantes, Toulouse =

Public park and botanical garden in Toulouse, France

Coordinates: 43.5929°N 1.4511°E

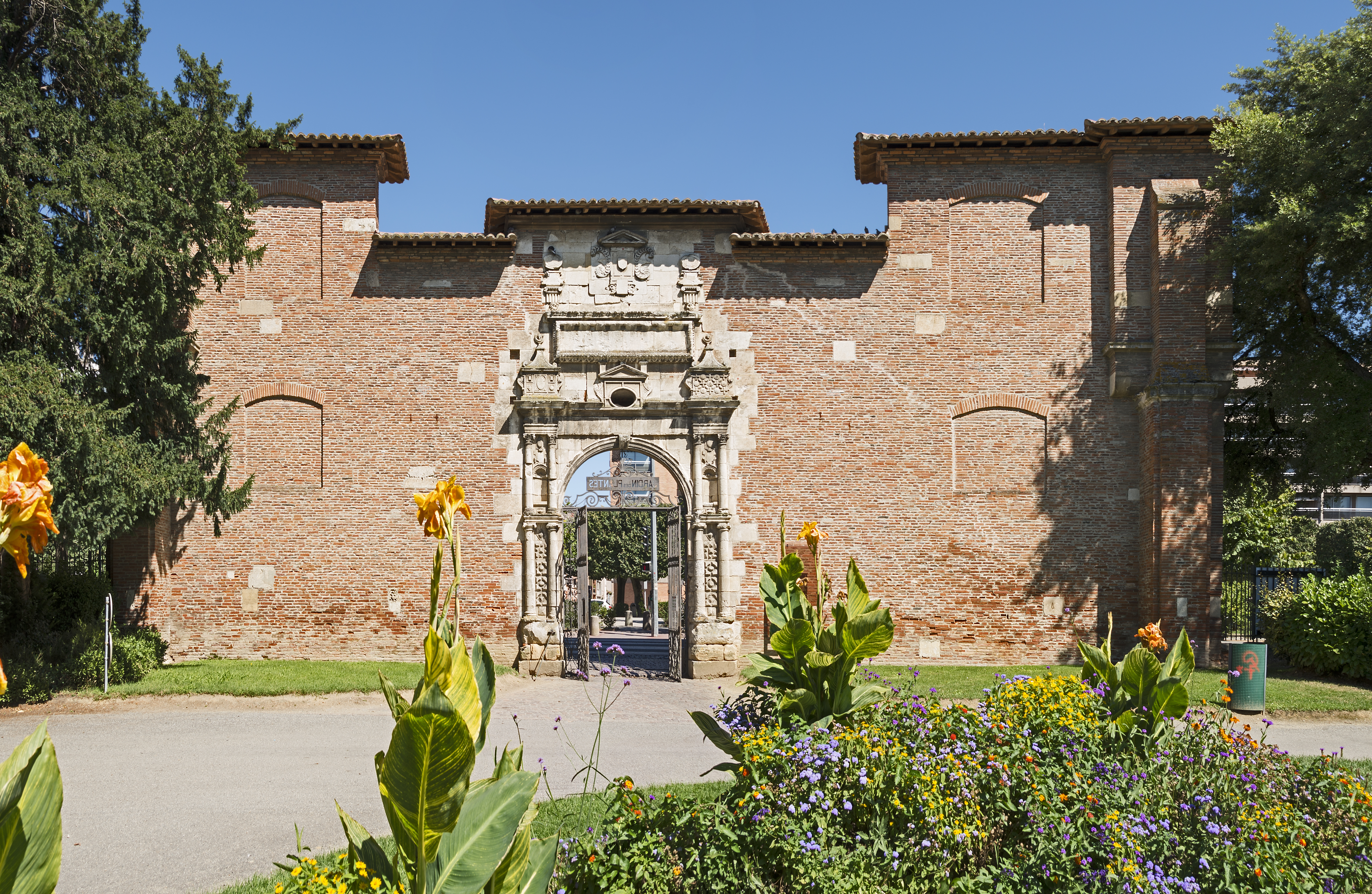
Entrance

The Jardin des Plantes (Occitan: Jardin dels Plantas) (7 hectares) is a public park and botanical garden located on Allée Jules-Guesde, Toulouse, France.

== History ==
The first botanical garden in Toulouse was created in 1730 by the Société des sciences de Toulouse (Society of Sciences of Toulouse) and located in the Saint-Sernin district, not far from the Matabiau. However, the quality of the ground was unsatisfactory, and in 1756 the collection was moved towards Sénéchaussée Street (now the Street of the Flowers). This second garden was surrounded by walls and in time proved to be too small. In 1794, thanks to naturalist Philippe-Isidore Picot de Lapeyrouse, the garden was relocated into part of the old enclosure of the Carmelite friars, where it remains.

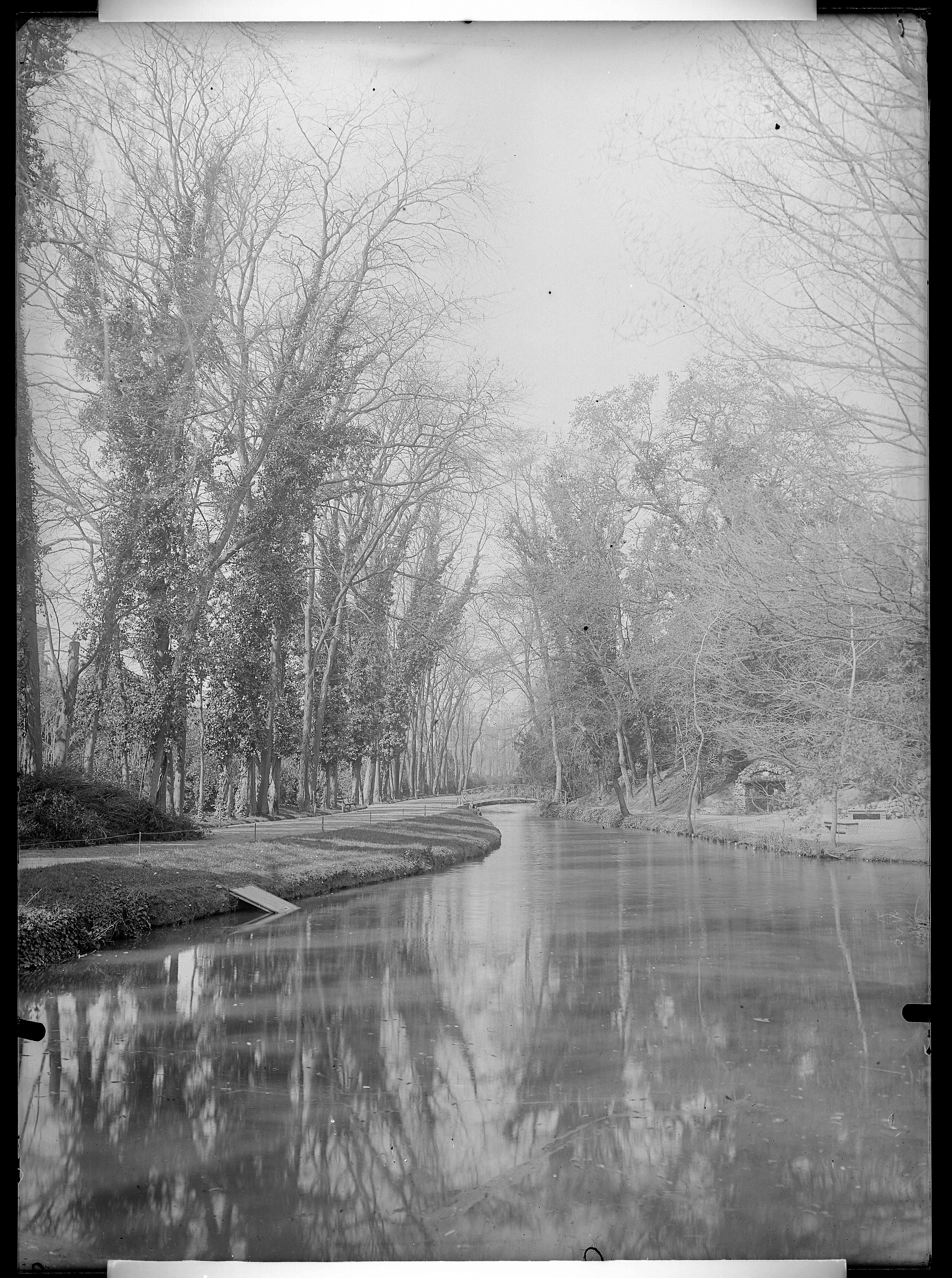
Toulouse : Botanical garden - canal April 1898, by Eugène Trutat. Conserved in the Muséum de Toulouse

This third site became both a large botanical garden and also a place where the poorest of the city could collect medicinal plants, growing to contain some 1,300 species, both local and acclimatised. By decree of July 27, 1808, Napoleon gave the grounds and the buildings of the garden to the city, and during the battle of Toulouse (April 10, 1814), the garden was used as artillery point. In 1885 the garden was slightly trimmed due to the construction of the Faculty of Medicine near the Allée Jules-Guesde, but at the same time it increased in size towards the Grand Allée. The garden was transformed for the arrival of the international exhibition of 1887, becoming a park.

== Present day ==
Today's botanical garden, the Jardin botanique Henri Gaussen, lies in the south-east of the downtown area, in the district of Busca close to the district of the Bridge of the Young Ladies, near the Canal du Midi. Although it was originally outside the city walls, it is now within a zone of very dense habitat mixing old construction and the more recent buildings.

It is bordered by the Medical school, the Natural history museum, the Daniel-Sorano theatre and the Saint-Exupère church. It is very close to Boulingrin but a broad avenue separates them. A metal footbridge makes it possible for pedestrians to travel between the two public parks.

The Garden has several old buildings or vestiges. The Natural History Museum dates to the end of the 16th century. The entrance door in the garden is a reconstitution of one of the doors of old Capitole, and dates back to 1886. The Northern door at Ozenne street was drawn by Virebent.

Ornaments

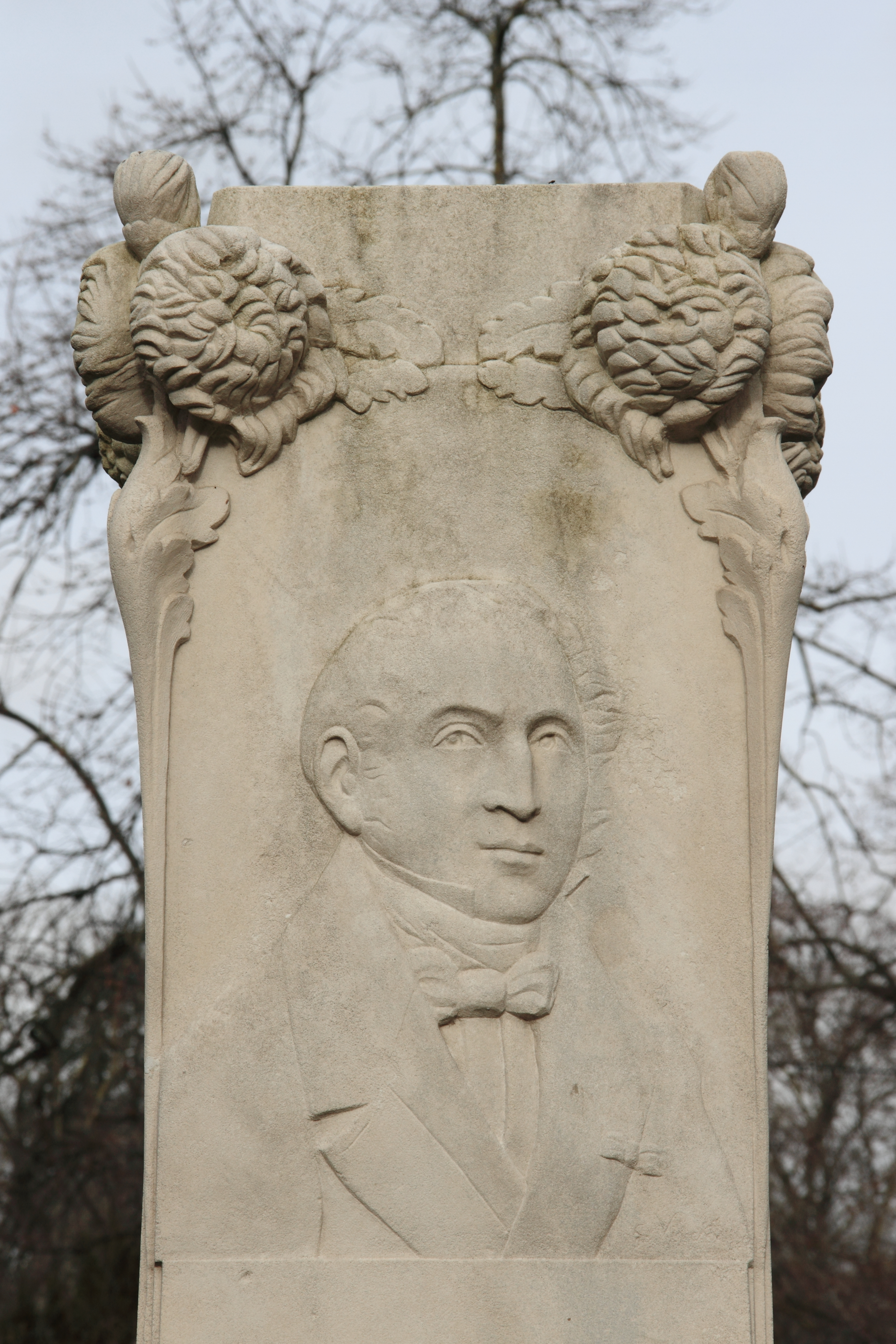
Memorial from "Capitaine Bernet"

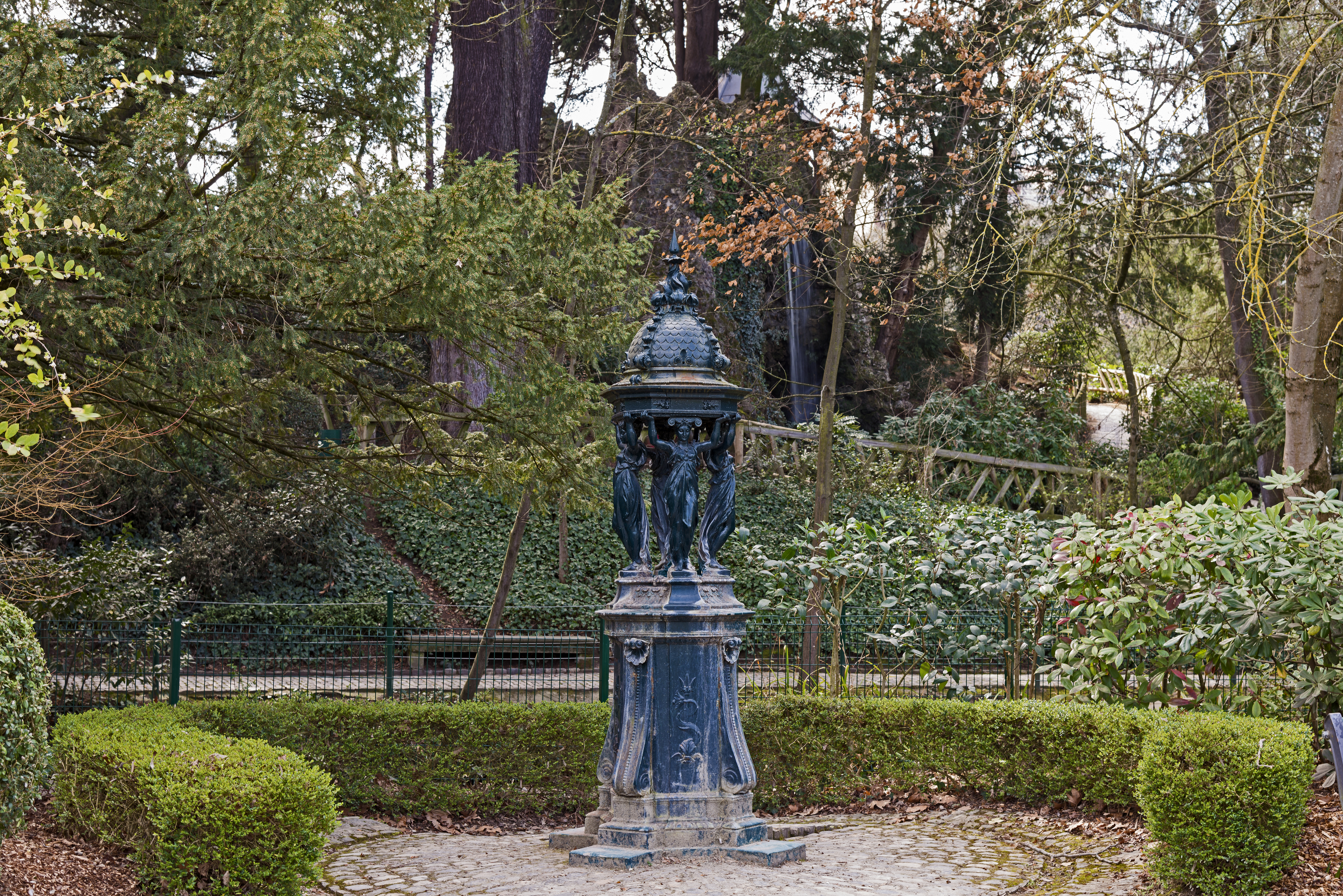
Wallace Fontaine

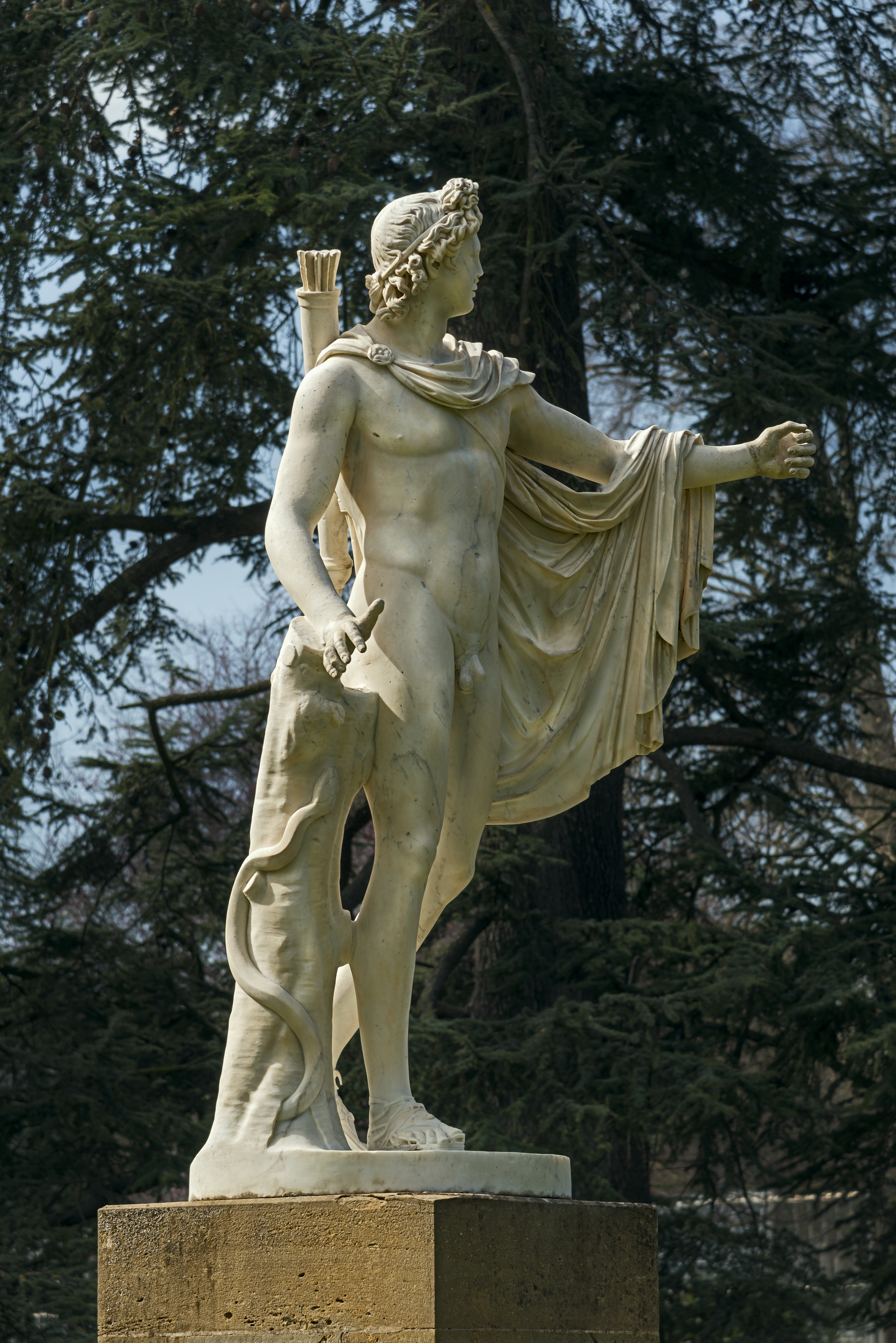
Apollo Belvedere

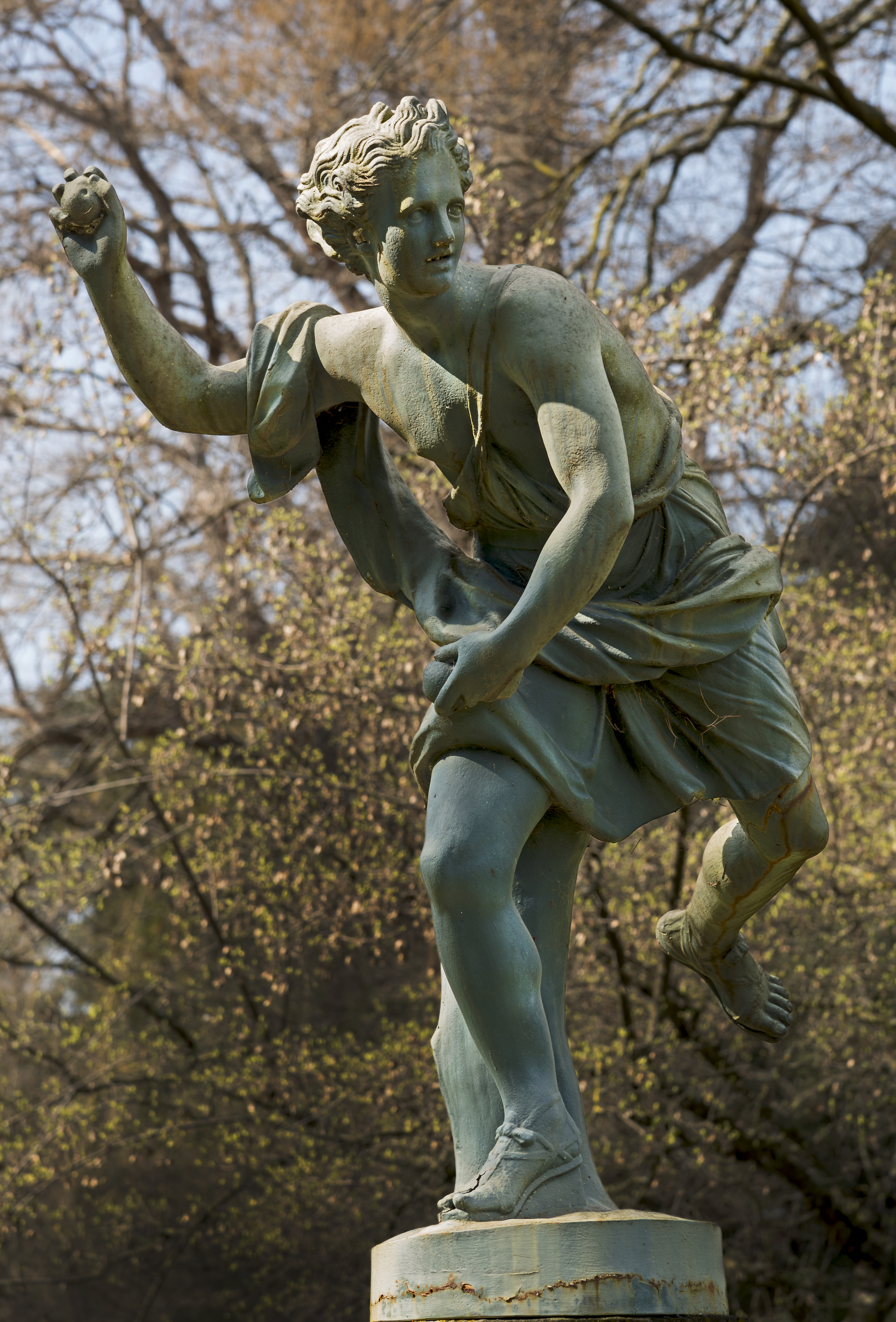
"Hippomène"

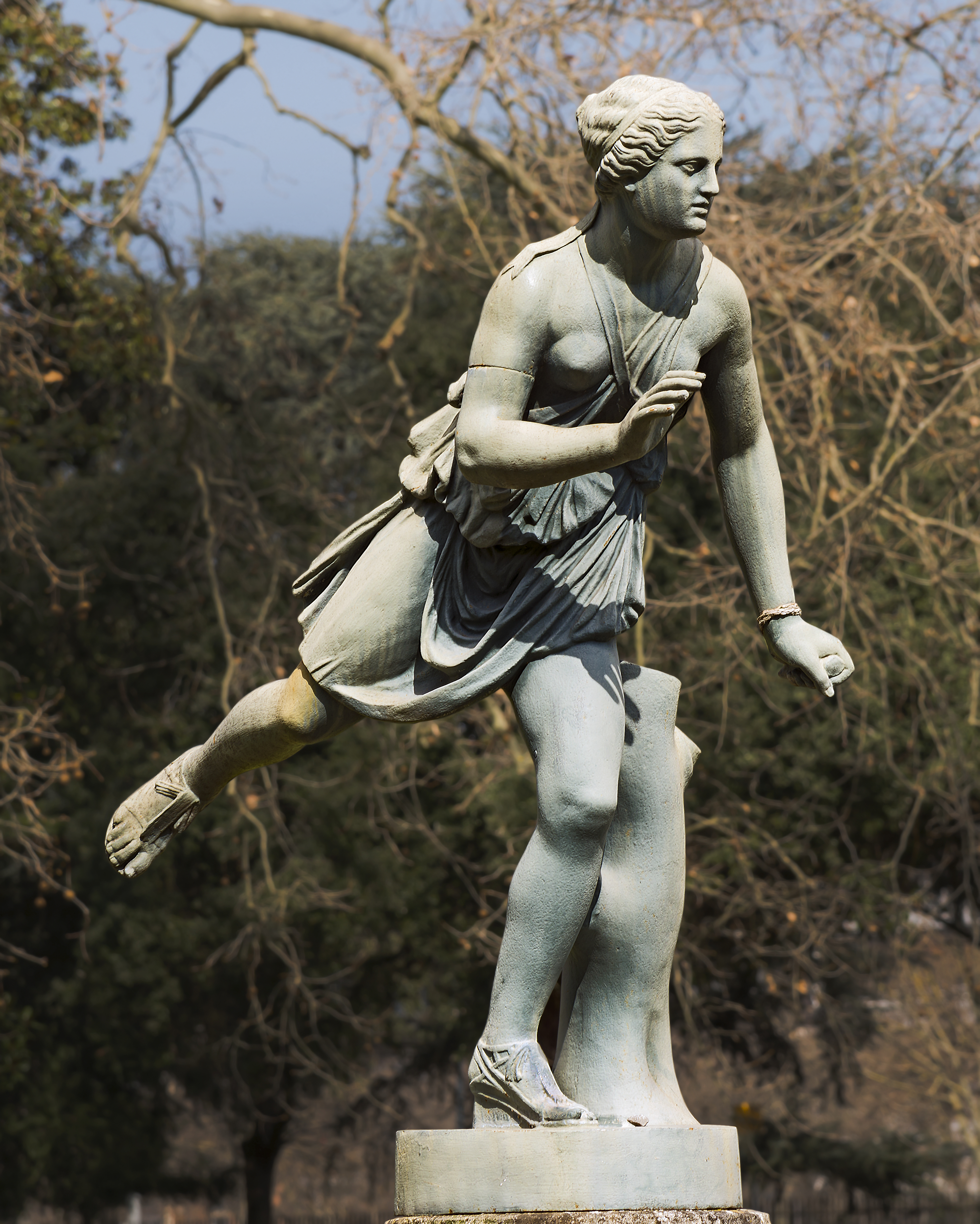
"Atalante"

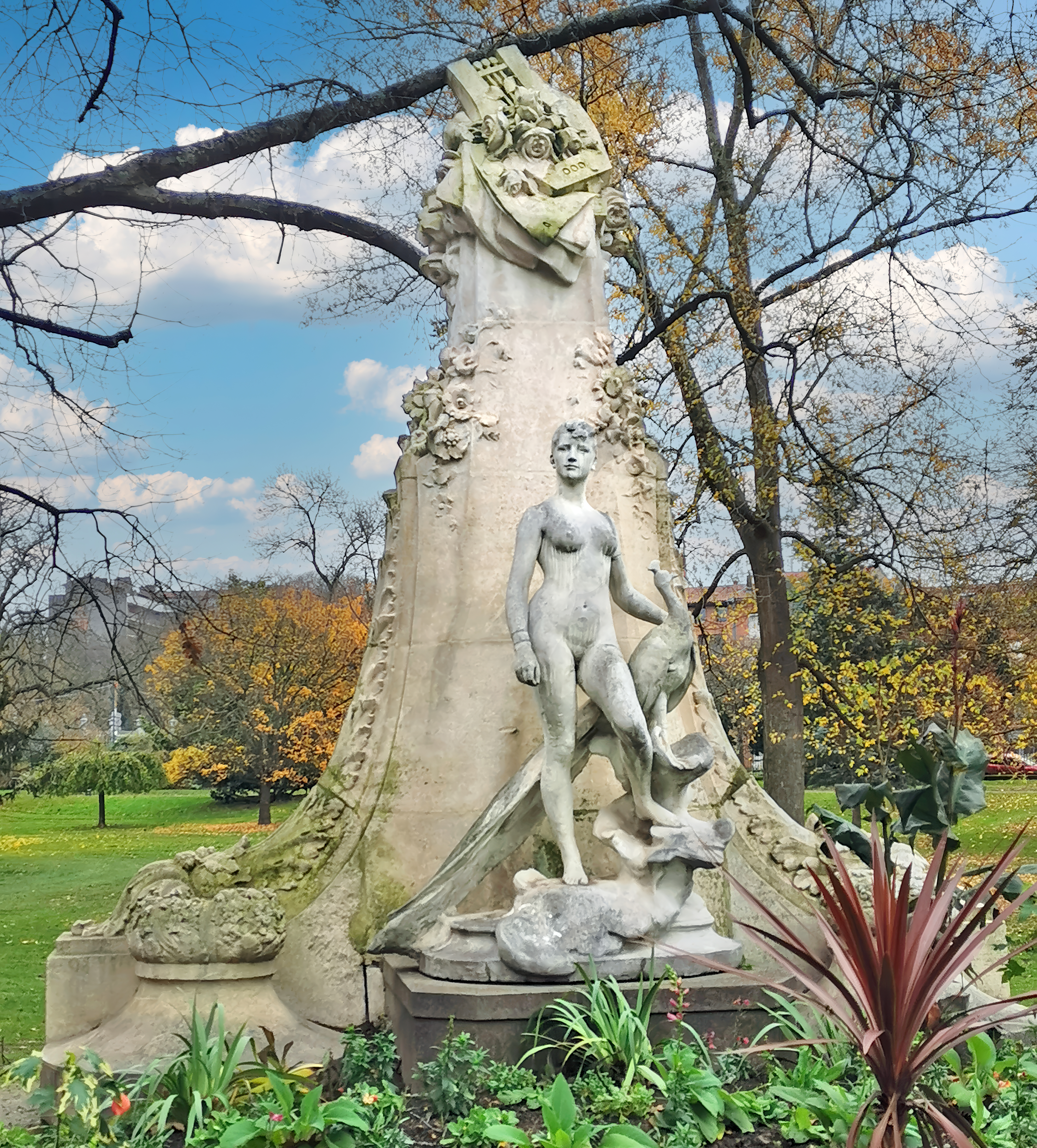
"La femme au paon" by A. Falguière

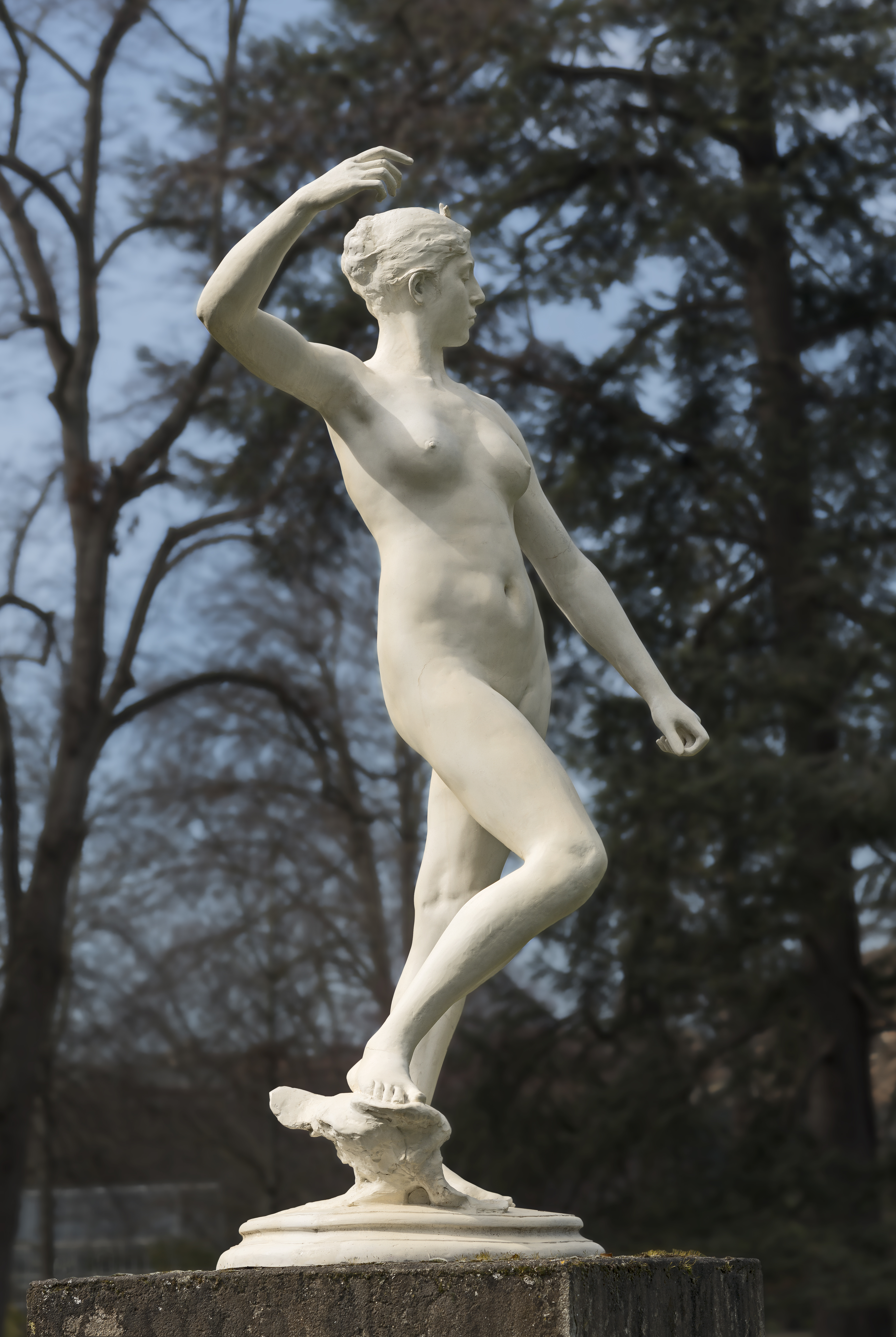
Diana by A. Falguière

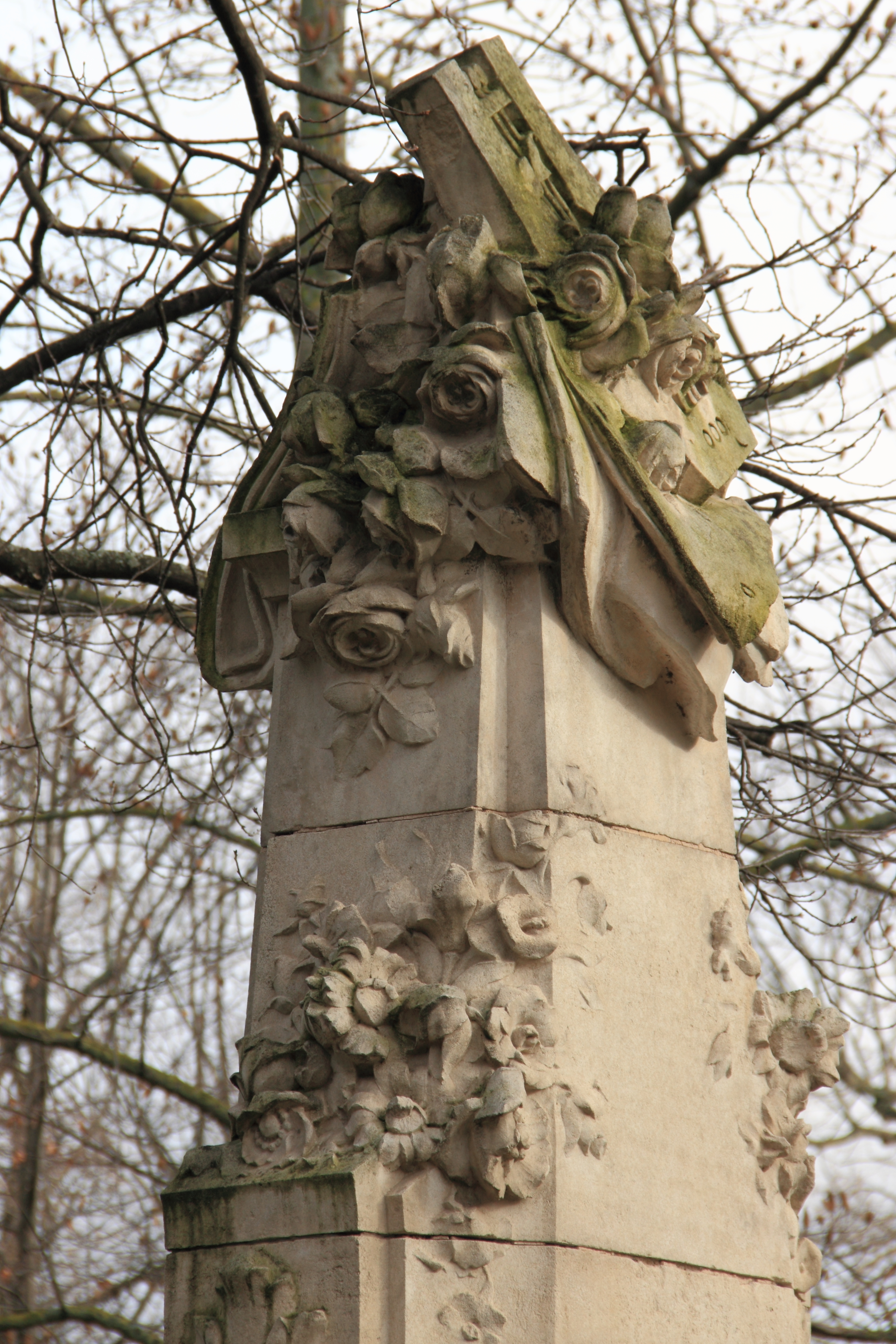
Jardin des Plantes de Toulouse

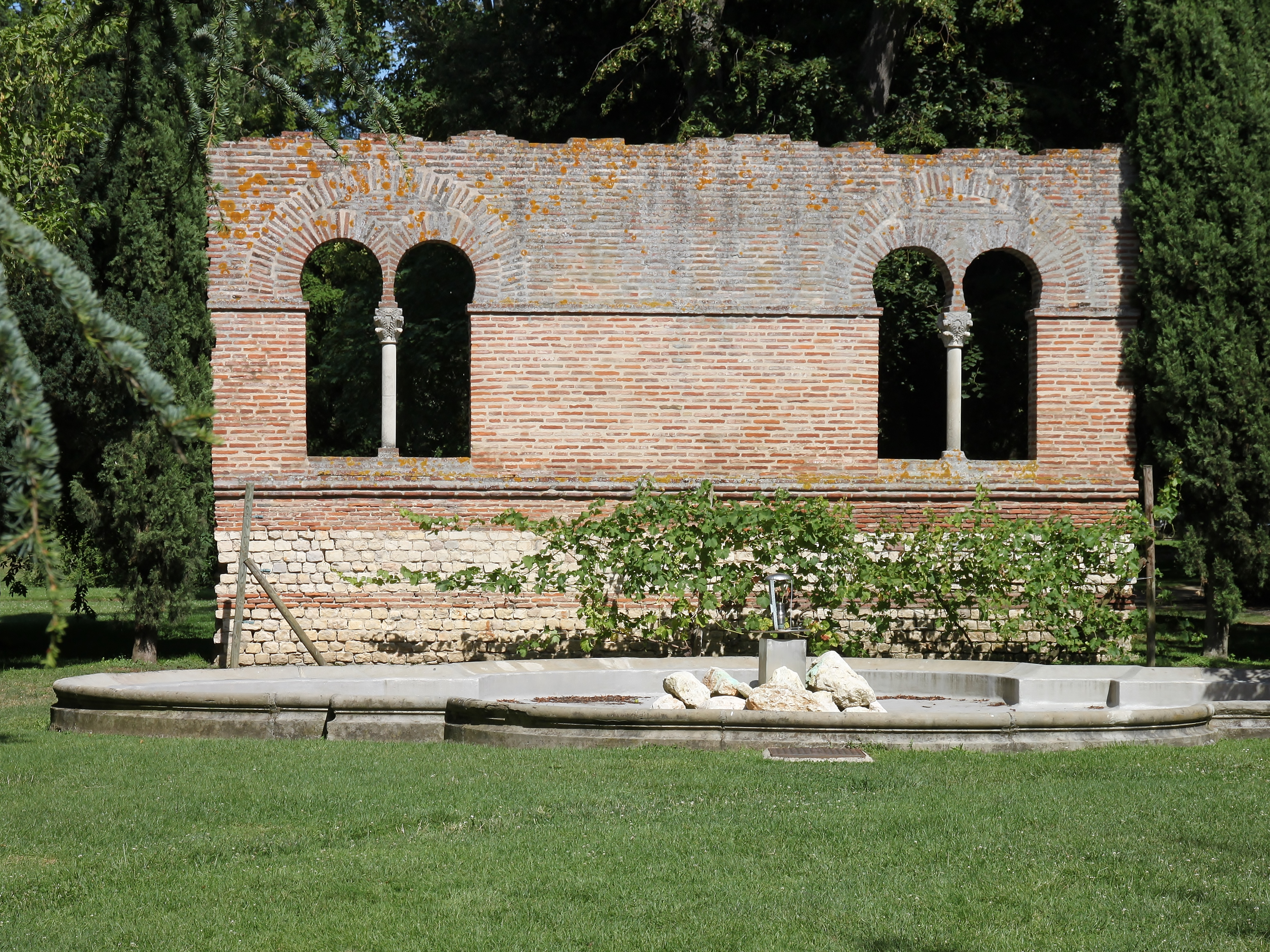
Romanesque wall reassembled in the garden.

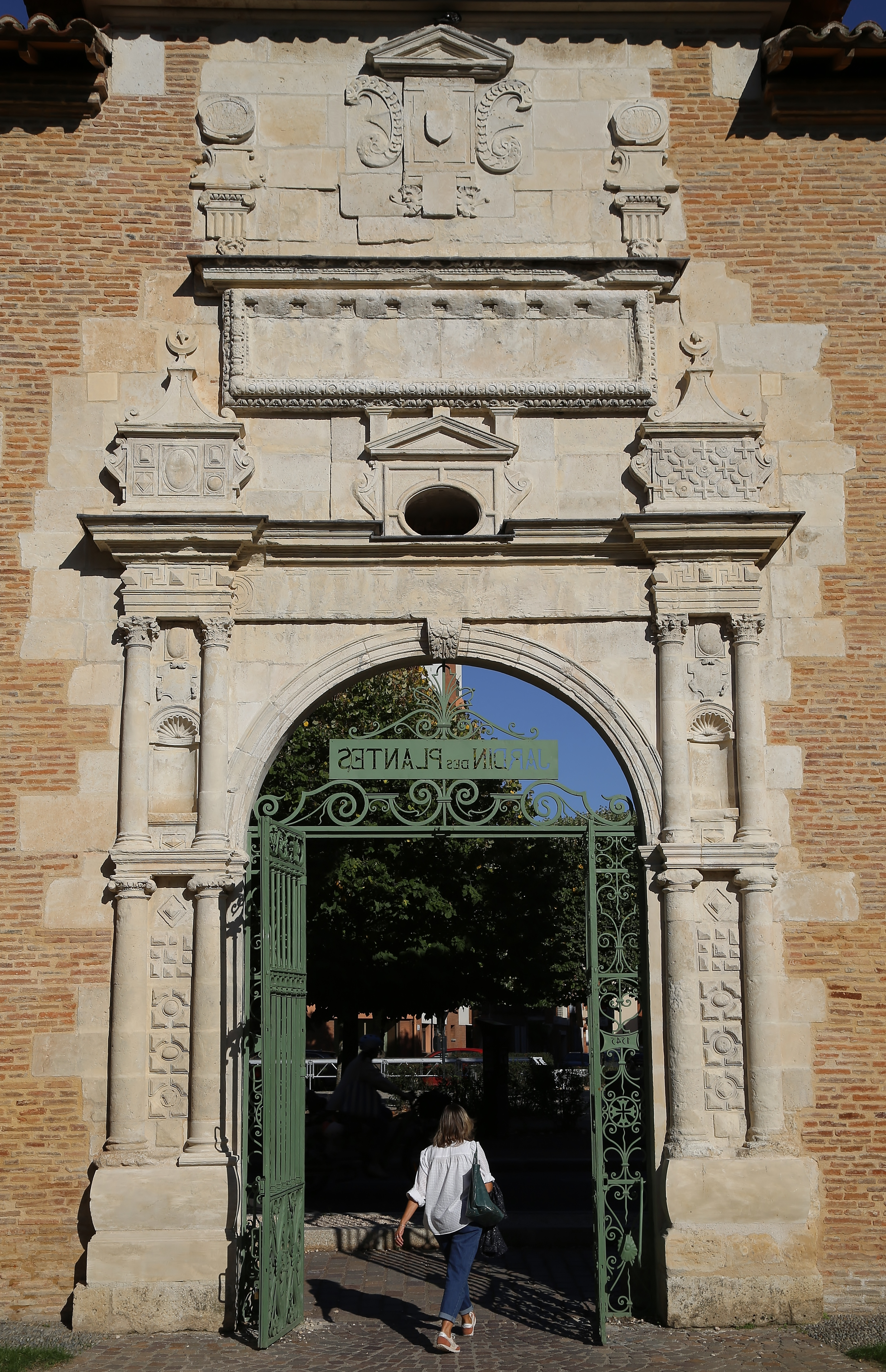
Renaissance door of the old city hall of Toulouse.

== See also ==
- List of botanical gardens in France
- Jardin Royal (Toulouse)
