= Lac d'Espingo =

French reservoir in the Pyrénées

- Location within Pyrenees
- Location: Haute-Garonne, Pyrénées
- Coordinates: 42°43′43″N 0°29′44″E
- Type: reservoir
- Basin countries: France
- Surface area: 0.076 km^{2} (0.029 sq mi)
- Surface elevation: 1,882 m (6,175 ft)

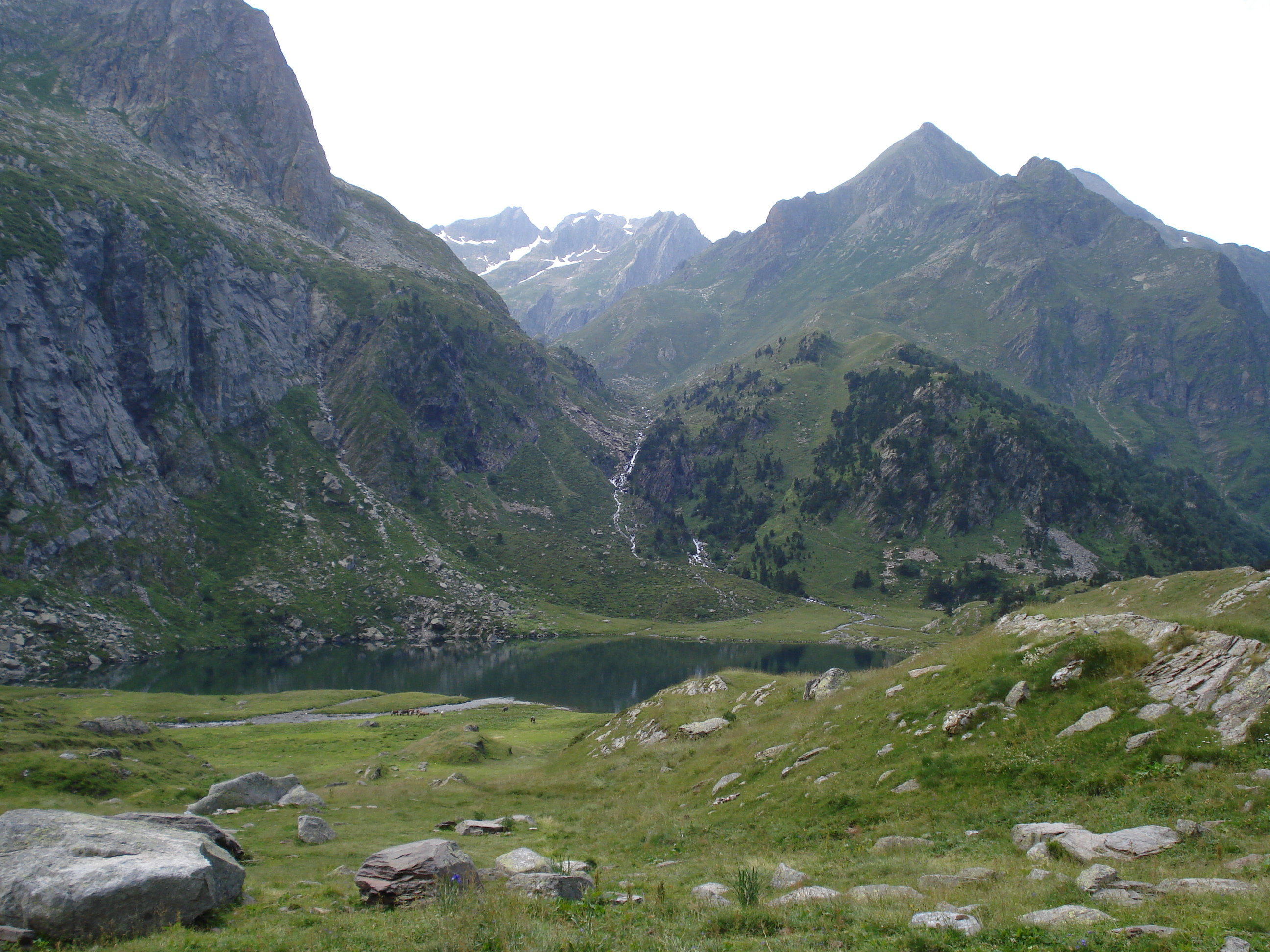

Lac d'Espingo is a lake in Haute-Garonne, Pyrénées, France. At an elevation of 1882 m, its surface area is 0.076 km². In 1836, James David Forbes reported it had mica similar to the mica palmier in granite near Bagnères-de-Luchon. In 1940, Henri Gaussen reported the lake sat nearly 2,000 meters above sea level and had 1.5 meters of rainfall per year.
