= BGI =

BGI may refer to:

- Bainbridge Graduate Institute, an MBA program based in Washington State
- Bagnoles-Gaussen Index, or Gaussen Index, a climatological measure of aridity
- Barclays Global Investors, an asset management business
- Basic Ground Instructor, a class of Ground Instructor certificate issued in the United States by the Federal Aviation Administration
- BGI Genomics, a genome sequencing company in China
- Borland Graphics Interface, a graphics library included with many Borland compiler products in the 1990s
- Grantley Adams International Airport, an airport in Barbados (IATA airport code)
