= Arboretum de Jouéou =

Arboretum in Haute-Garonne, Midi-Pyrénées, France

Coordinates: 42.732025°N 0.625789°E

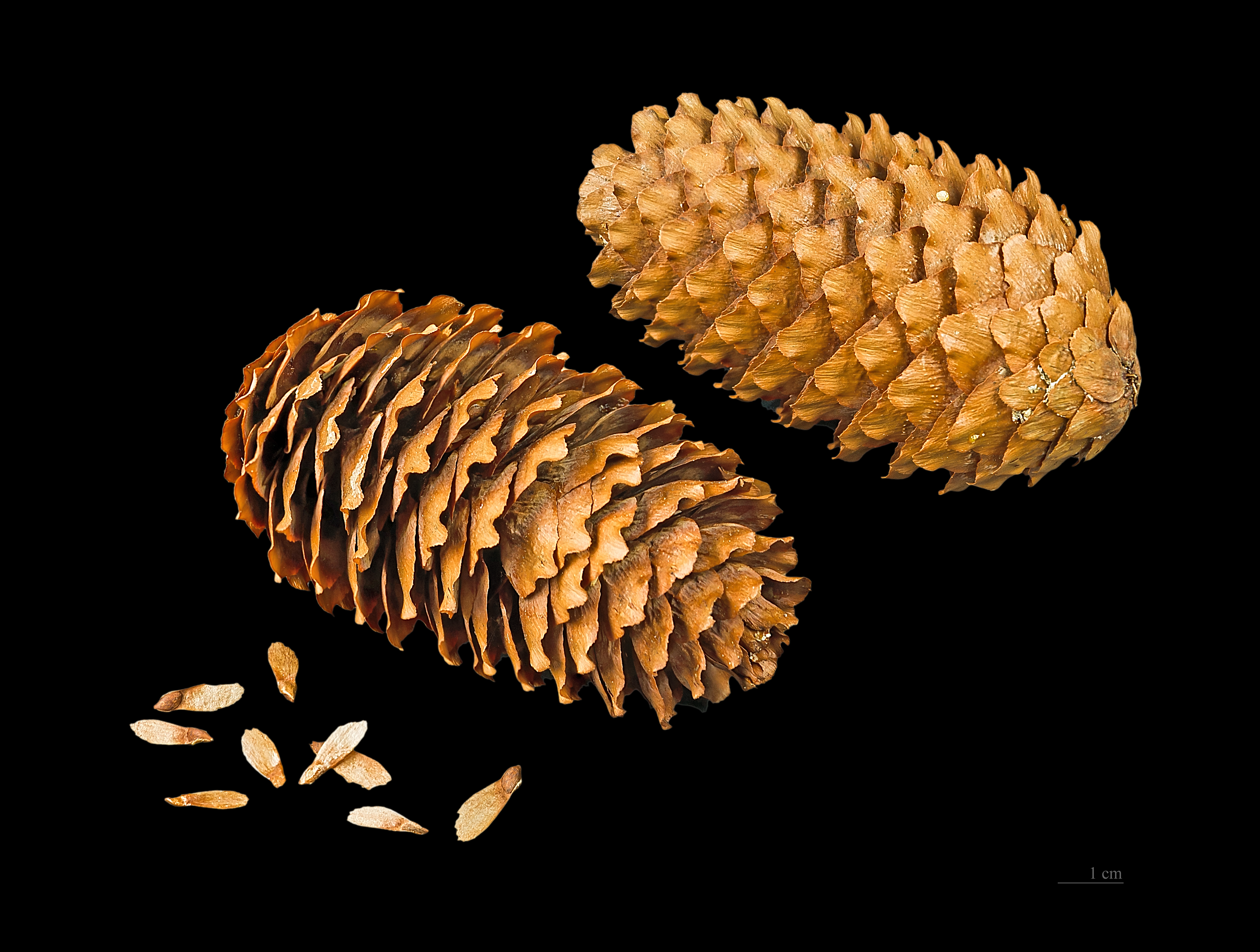
Picea likiangensis - MHNT

The Arboretum de Jouéou (1.9 hectares), also known as the Arboretum Henri Gaussen, is an arboretum located on the Route de l'Hospice de France in Bagnères-de-Luchon, Haute-Garonne, Midi-Pyrénées, France. It opens daily.

The arboretum was created 1921-1928 by Professor Henri Gaussen, and continues to be managed by the Jardin botanique Henri Gaussen of the Université Paul Sabatier in Toulouse. It contains 250 conifer taxa from around the world, of which 186 are naturally occurring and 64 hybrids and cultivars, organized systematically with American species to the west, and Mediterranean, central Europe, and Asia to the east. The garden is arranged in two sections:

- The botanical collection, in which each conifer species is represented by four individuals, containing over 100 species, mostly from North America and Eurasia.
- The collection of breeds and varieties, which compares side-by-side specimens of the same species but of different geographic origin.

The arboretum has been recognized by the Conservatoire des Collections Végétales Spécialisées (CCVS) for its conifer collection.

== See also ==
- List of botanical gardens in France
