= Gémil =

- Commune
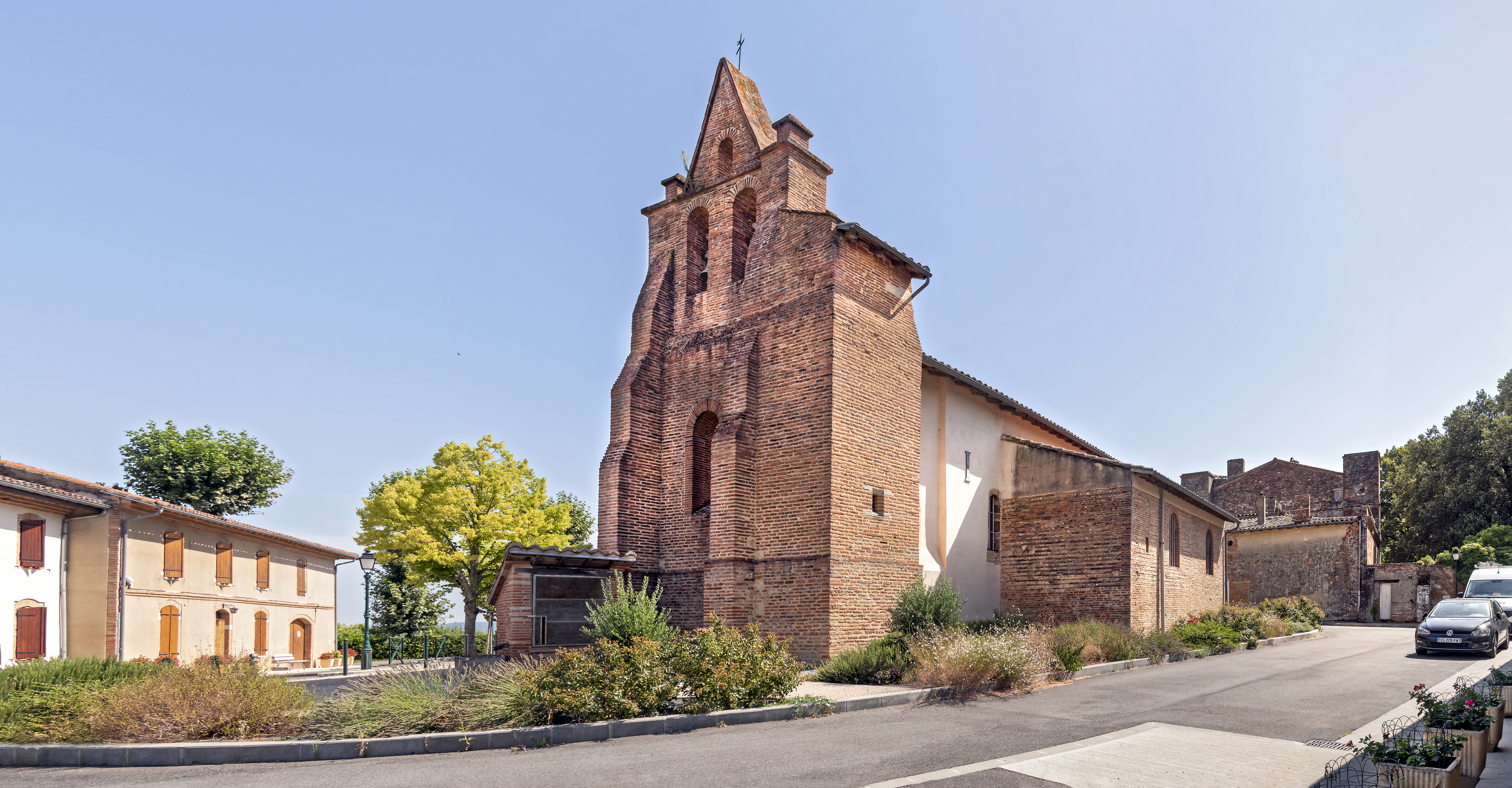
- Church square

- Coat of arms
- Location of Gémil
- Location within France Location within Occitanie
- Coordinates: 43°44′11″N 1°35′30″E
- Country: France
- Region: Occitania
- Department: Haute-Garonne
- Arrondissement: Toulouse
- Canton: Pechbonnieu
- Intercommunality: Coteaux du Girou

Government
  - Mayor (2020–2026): Jean-Noël Baudou
- Area^{1}: 2.81 km^{2} (1.08 sq mi)
- Elevation: 194 m (636 ft)
- Highest elevation: 200 m (660 ft)
- Lowest elevation: 130 m (430 ft)
- Population (2023): 483
  - Density: 172/km^{2} (445/sq mi)
- Time zone: UTC+01:00 (CET)
  - Summer (DST): UTC+02:00 (CEST)
- INSEE/Postal code: 31216 /31380
- ^{1} French Land Register data, which excludes lakes, ponds, glaciers > 1 km^{2} (0.386 sq mi or 247 acres) and river estuaries.

Gémil (Occitan: Gem) is a commune in the Haute-Garonne department in southwestern France.

== Population ==
Historical population
Year	Pop.	±% p.a.
1968	107	—
1975	141	+4.02%
1982	174	+3.05%
1990	201	+1.82%
1999	196	−0.28%
2007	269	+4.04%
2012	272	+0.22%
2017	270	−0.15%
2023	483	+10.18%
Source: INSEE

The inhabitants of the commune are called Gémilois in French.

== See also ==
- Communes of the Haute-Garonne department

== Gallery ==
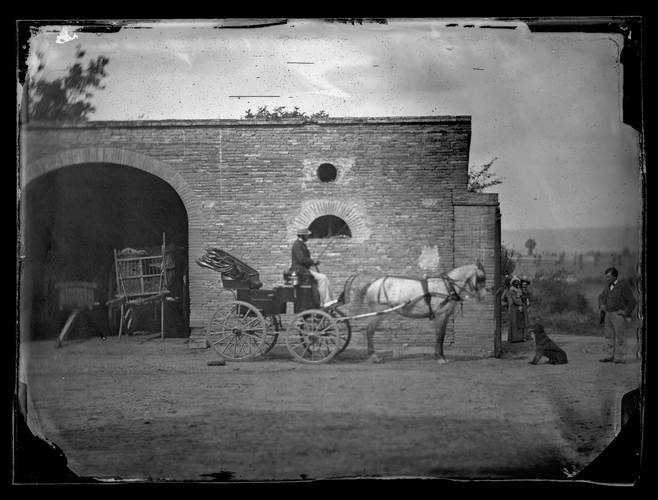
Photograph of Gémil (1881) by Eugène Trutat
