= Jardin botanique Henri Gaussen =

Botanical garden in Midi-Pyrénées, France

Coordinates: 43°35′36″N 1°26′59″E

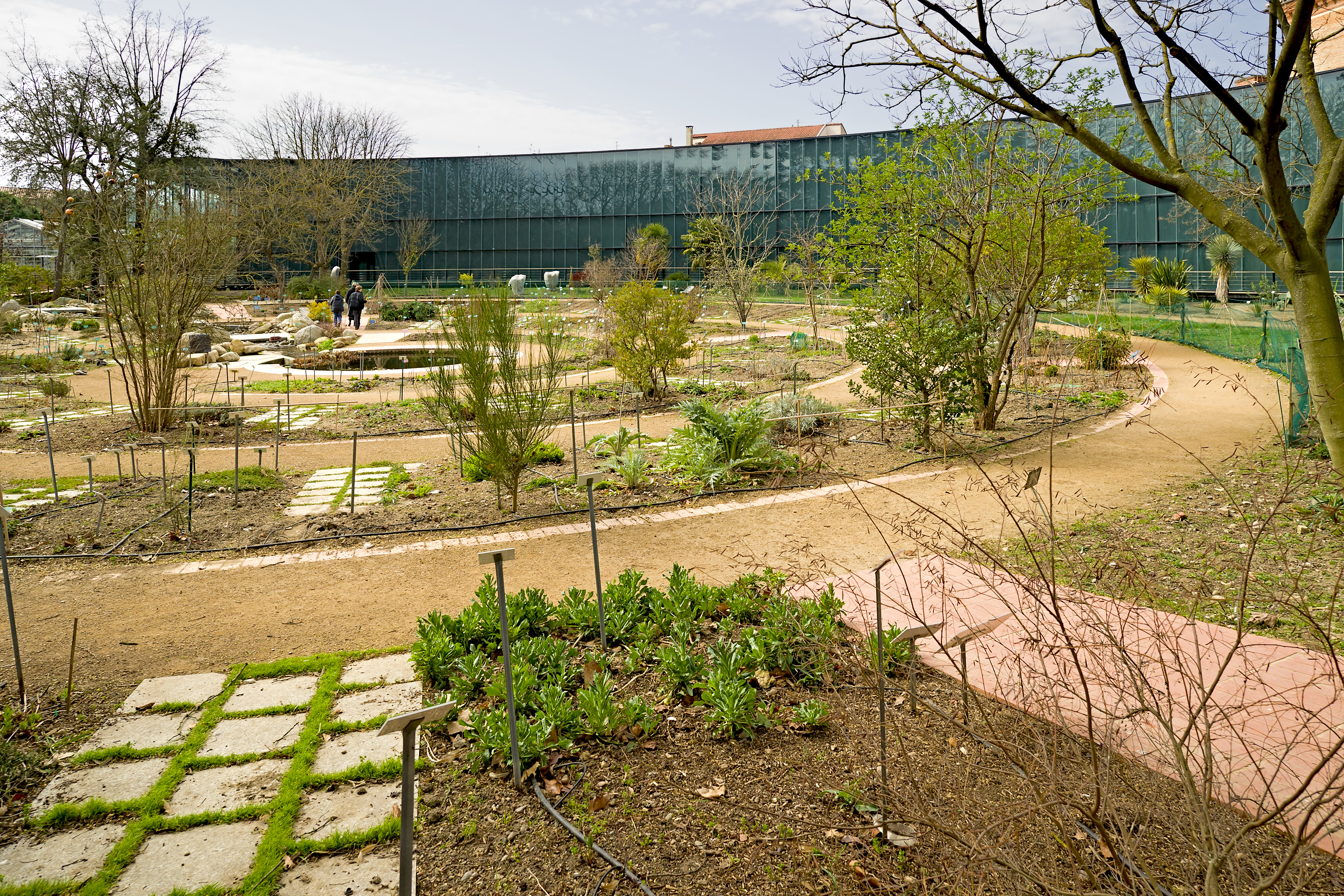
The spiral Ethnobotanical.

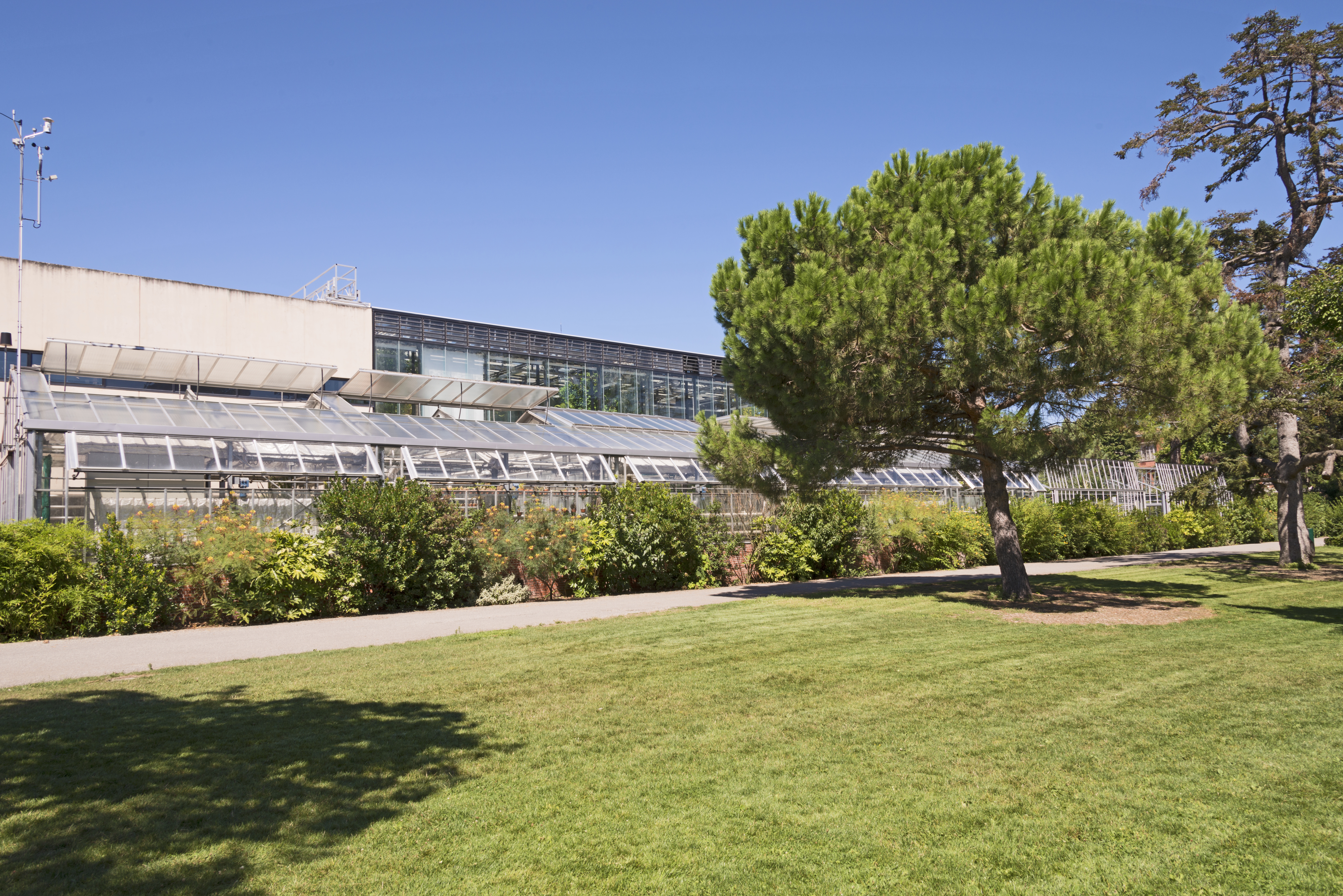
Greenhouses, Lane Claudine Sudre

The Jardin botanique Henri Gaussen is a botanical garden operated by the Université Paul Sabatier at 39 allées Jules Guesde, Toulouse, Haute-Garonne, Midi-Pyrénées, France. It is open weekdays in the warmer months.

The botanical garden was originally created by Philippe-Isidore Picot de Lapeyrouse in the Jardin des Plantes (7 hectares) established within the grounds of a Carmelite monastery requisitioned during the French Revolution. It was divided into sections (medicinal plants, industrial, edible), and eventually grew to incorporate more than 5000 species from the nearby Pyrenees and around the world.

Today's garden is maintained by the Université Paul Sabatier as an adjunct to the natural history museum of Toulouse. It contains about 2500 taxa of plants in an ethnobotanical collection arranged into sections of medicinal, industrial, and edible plants, as well as six greenhouses (450 m^{2}) and a herbarium with about 300,000 specimens. Of particular interest are its collections of toxic plants (840 species), tropical plants (145 species), epiphytes (300 species), succulents (730 species), and carnivorous plants (90 species). Its collections also include about 4500 photographic plates and 35,000 diapositives taken by Prof. Henri Gaussen documenting the flora of the French Pyrenees. The Arboretum de Jouéou is also administered as part of this garden.

== See also ==
- Arboretum de Jouéou
- List of botanical gardens in France
