= Eugène Trutat =

French naturalist, mountaineer, pyreneist, geologist and photographer

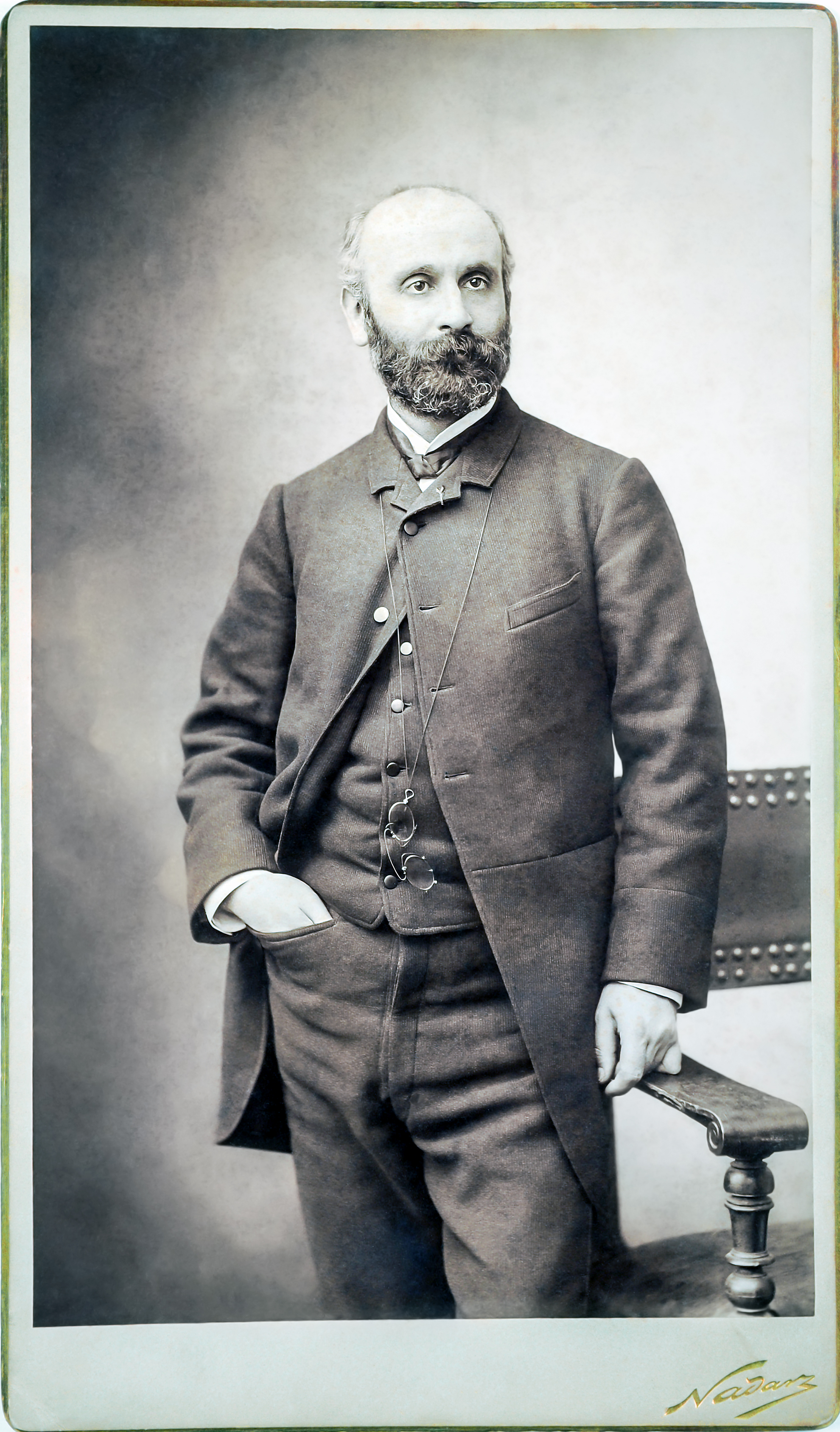
- Portrait of Eugène Trutat by Nadar
- Born: 25 August 1840
- Died: 6 August 1910 (aged 69)
- Occupations: Naturalist, mountaineer, geologist, photographer

Eugène Trutat (25 August 1840 – 6 August 1910) was a French naturalist, mountaineer, pyreneist, geologist and photographer, who was curator of the Museum of Toulouse.

He began taking photographs in 1859, and produced almost 15,000 over the course of the next fifty years, covering a wide range of topics.

In 2020, Anna Neimark, Faculty at SCI-Arc and Co-Principal of First Office in Los Angeles presented the exhibition Rude Forms among us (Los Angeles) in collaboration with Frédérique Gaillard, Curatorial Assistant and Head of Photo Library at Museum of Toulouse. Dolmens are prehistoric stone assemblies. At the end of the 19th century, Eugène Trutat, Director of the Museum of Natural History of Toulouse, took photographs of these megalithic structures in the French landscape. Inspired by the Dolmen de Vaour in Tarn, this exhibition imagines extending the elusive quality of rude forms into the modern-day Accessory Dwelling Unit (ADU).

== Publications ==
- La Photographie appliquée à l’archéologie, Paris, Gauthier-Villars, 1879
- Traité élémentaire du microscope, Paris, Gauthier-Villars, 1883
- La Photographie appliquée à l’histoire naturelle, 1884
- Les Papiers photographiques par développement,
- Une excursion à Montpellier-le-Vieux (Aveyron), Toulouse, imp. Durand, 1885
- Le Midi pittoresque, la Vallée de la Garonne, Limoges, Marc Barbou et Cie, 1894
- Les Pyrénées, Paris, librairie J.-B. Baillière, 1896
- La Photographie animée, 1899

== Publications on Eugène Trutat & exhibitions ==
- Objectifs Pyrénées, sur les traces d'Eugène Trutat, Museum of Toulouse, 2011. Monography : Eugène Trutat, savant et photographe, 2011. (ISBN 978-2-906702-21-9).
- Regard'Ailleurs, Voyage en Algérie, Muséum de Toulouse, 2011 (exhibition).
- Monography : Bertrand de Vivies, Luce Lebart, Frédérique Gaillard and Donatien Rousseau, Le Tarn : Regard Photographique (1840-1910), Éditions Grand Sud, Albi, France, 2013 (ISBN 978-2363780416).
- Biarritz par Georges Ancely et Eugène Trutat, Aquarium de Biarritz, Biarritz, France (from July 11, 2016, to January 8, 2017) Monography : Bruno Fay, Marc Ancely, Frédérique Gaillard, Luce Lebart and Patrice Guérin, Biarritz par Georges Ancely er Eugène Trutat, Aquarium de Biarritz, Biarritz, France, 2016.
- Frédérique Gaillard, « Sciences, enseignement et photographie : les indissociables activités d’Eugène Trutat (1840-1910) » In La plaque photographique. Un outil pour la fabrication et la diffusion des savoirs (19th–20th centuries), under the direction of Denise Borlée and Hervé Doucet, Institut d’Histoire de l’art (EA 3400), Presses Universitaires de Strasbourg, France, 2019.
- Rude forms among us, by Anna Neimark in collaboration with Frédérique Gaillard, SCI-Arc (from January 31 to March 27, 2020), Los Angeles, 2020 (exhibition).
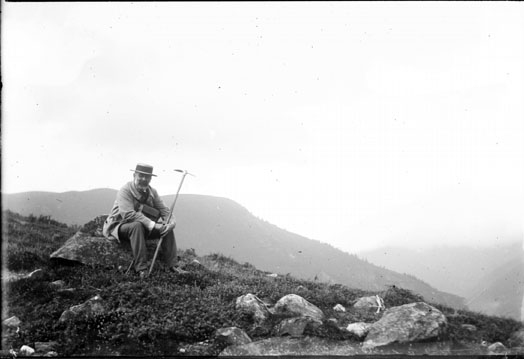
Eugène Trutat in 1897

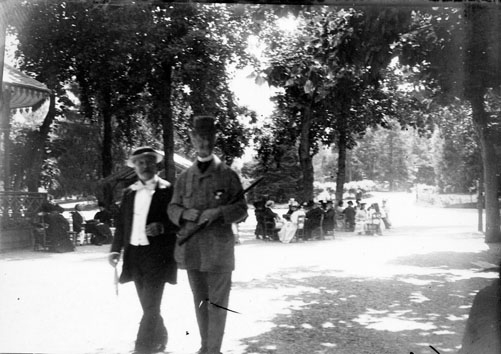
Henry Russell (right) and the baron de Lassus (left) in Luchon, in 1895, photograph by Eugène Trutat

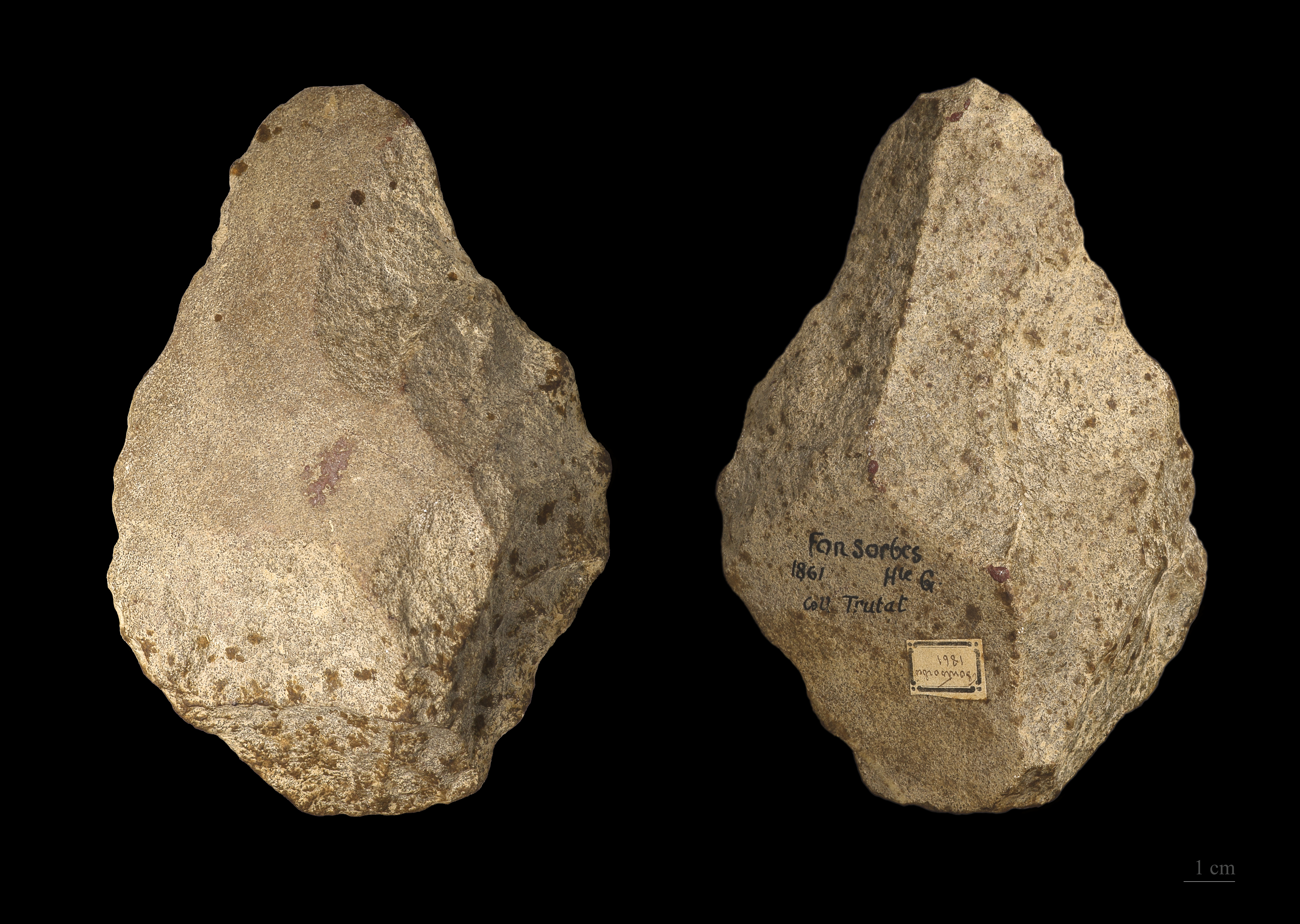
Chopper - Collection Eugene Trutat

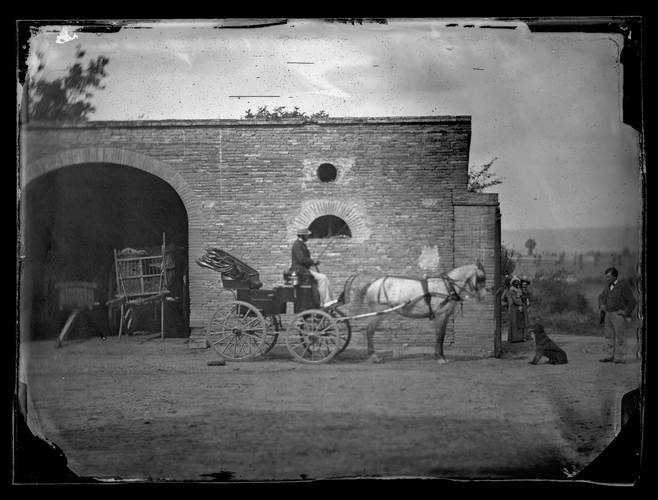
Vue d'ensemble de M. Montano conduisant sa voiture dans la cour d'une ferme, Gémil, 1881

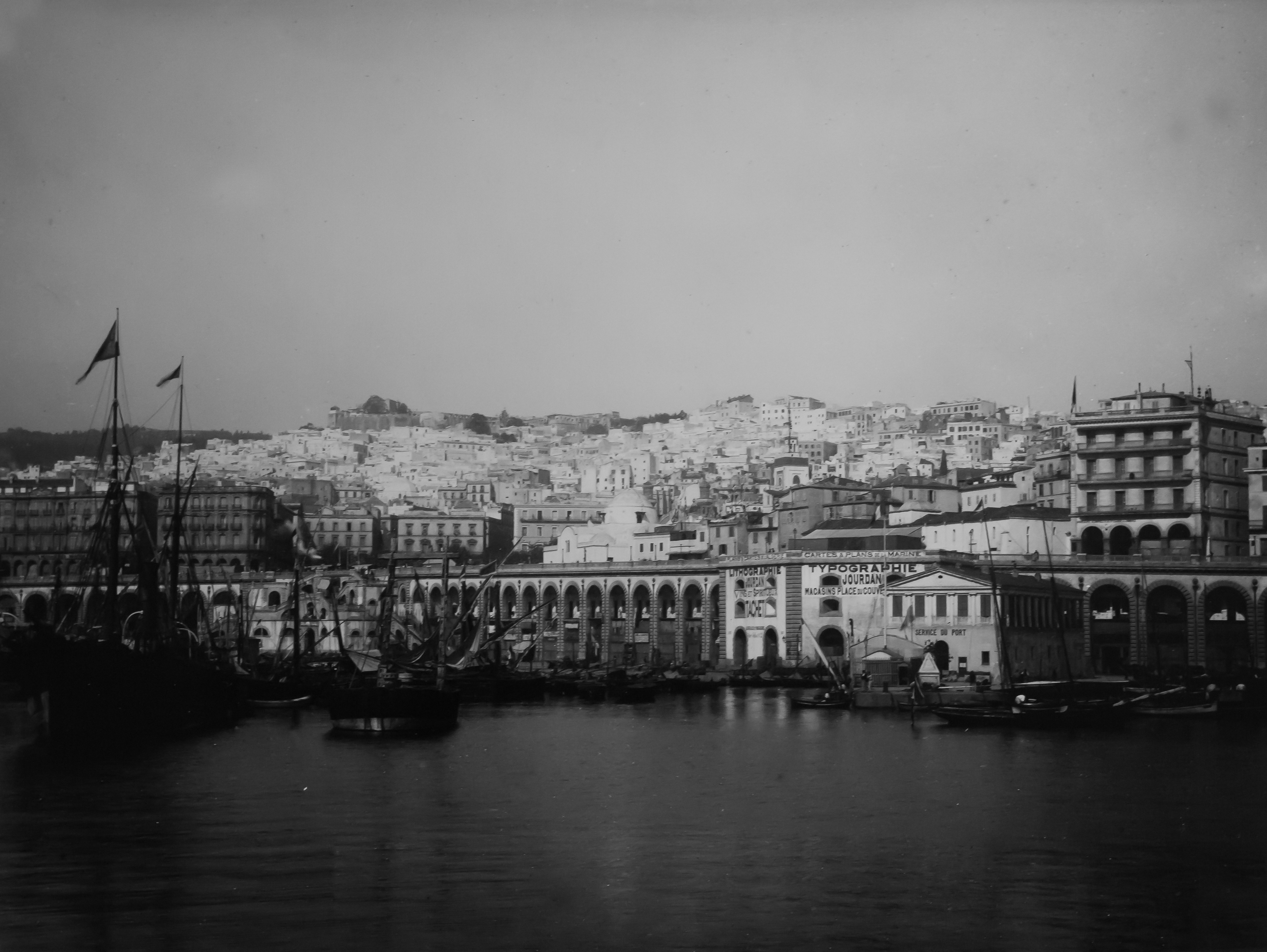
Harbor of Alger, 1881, Collection Eugene Trutat

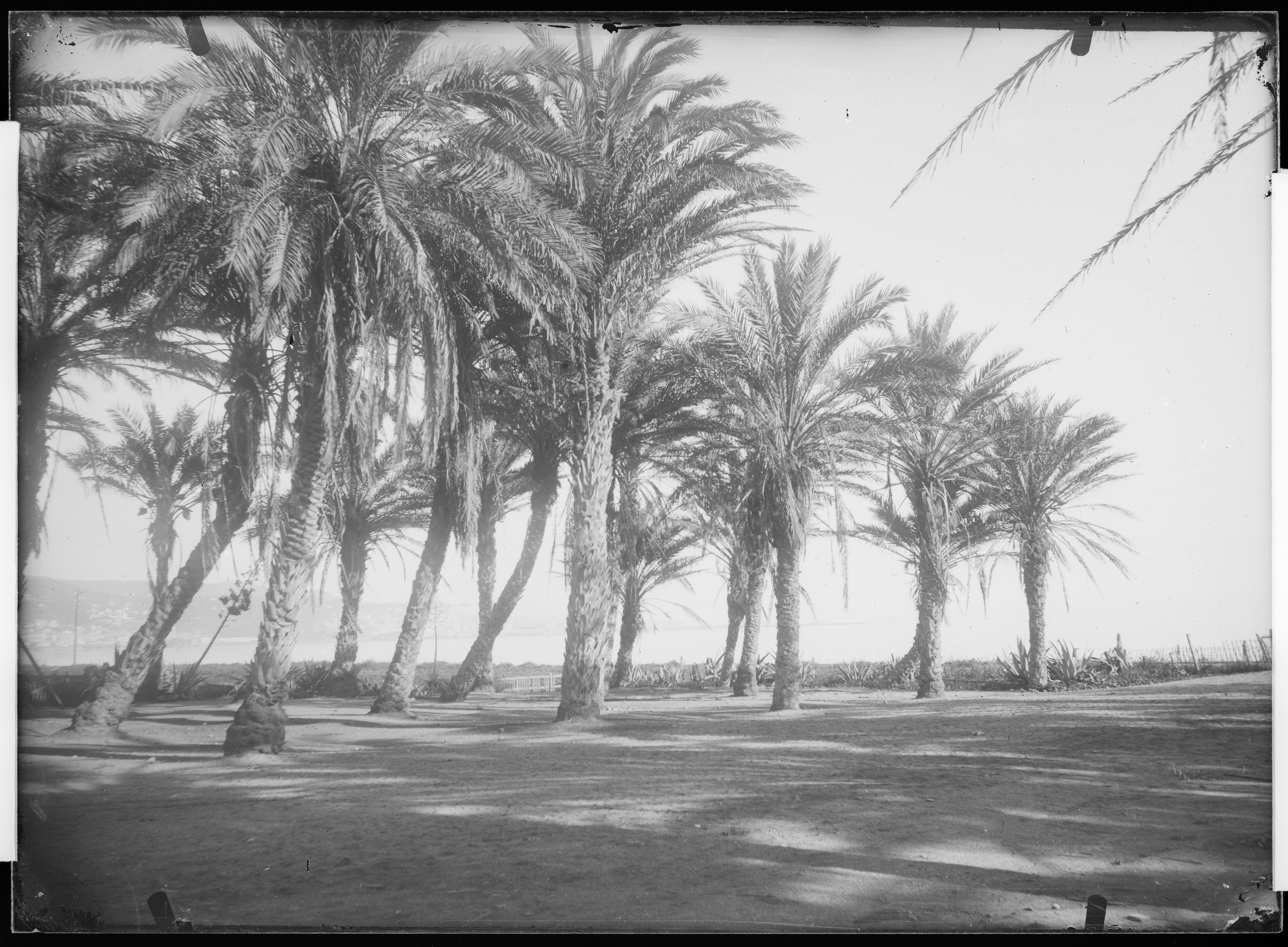
Palms of Alger, , 1881, Collection Eugene Trutat

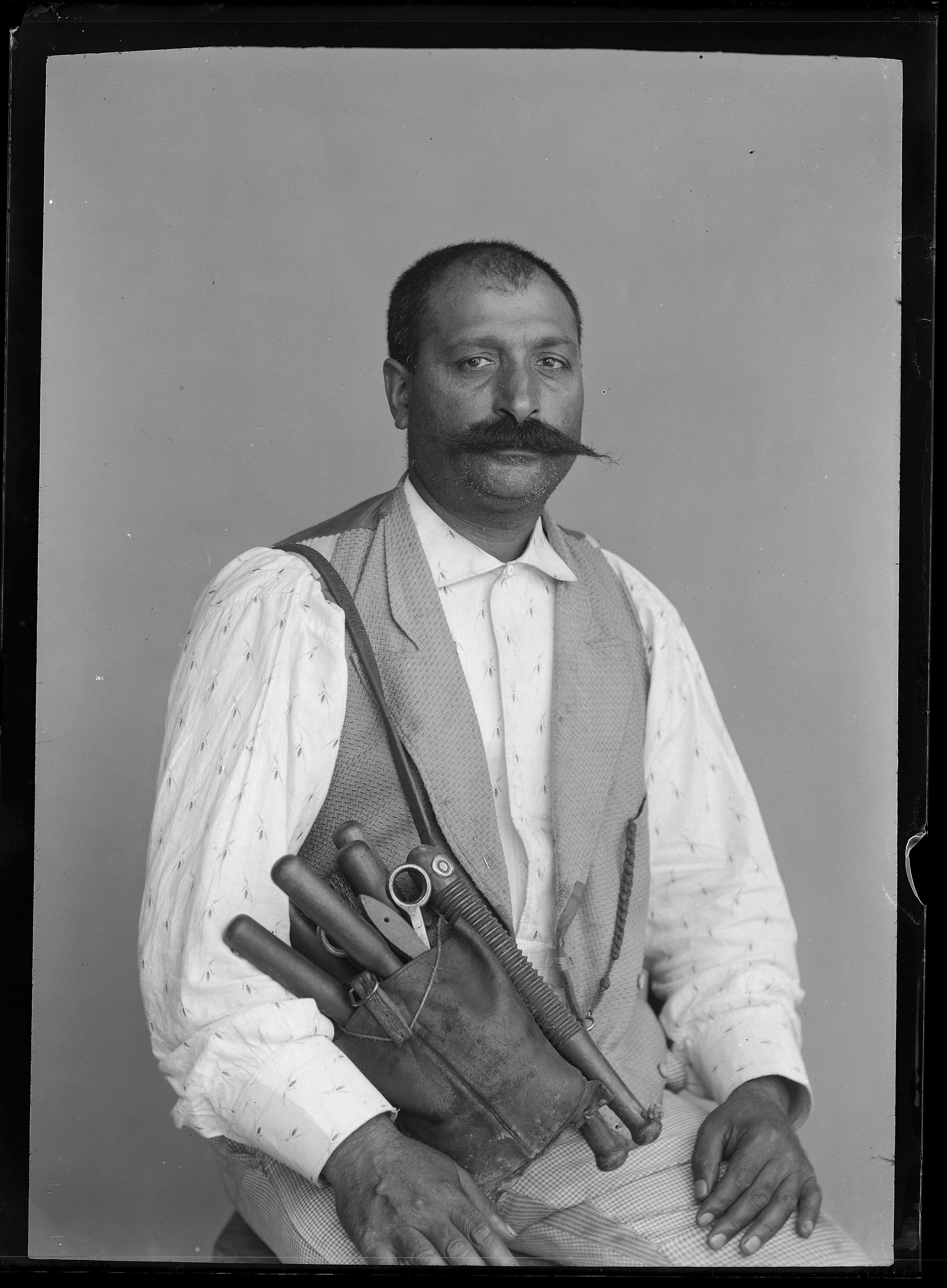
Espinasse père, Gitan de St Cyprien, 1895

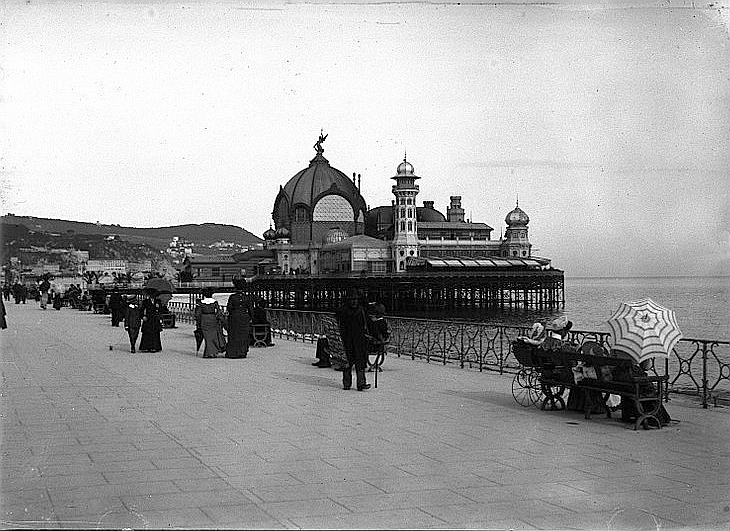
Casino et Promenades des anglais, Nice, 1904

Grand Palais, Exposition Universelle de 1900, Paris

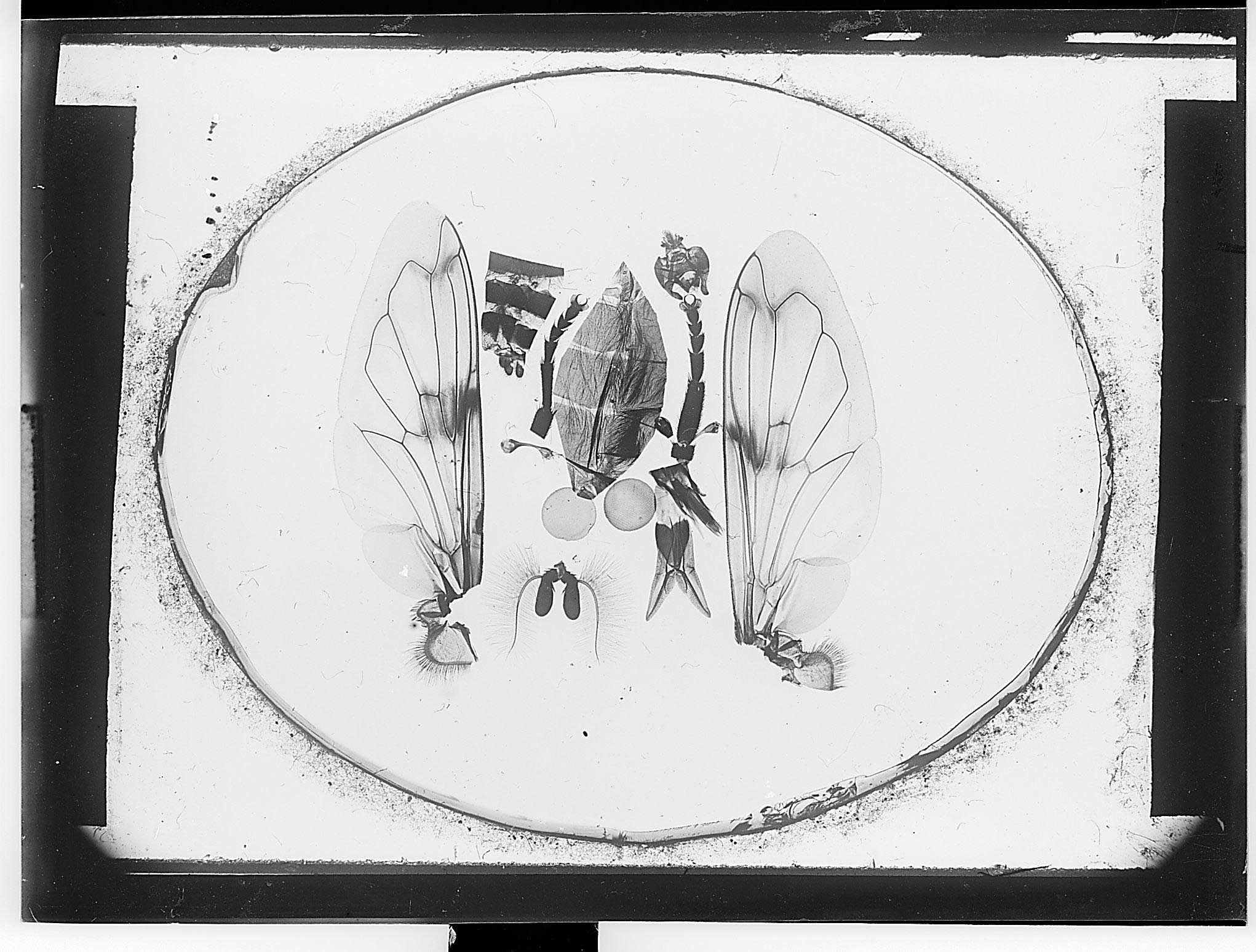
Pièces anatomiques d'un diptère, sans date

Paris, Exposition Universelle 1900

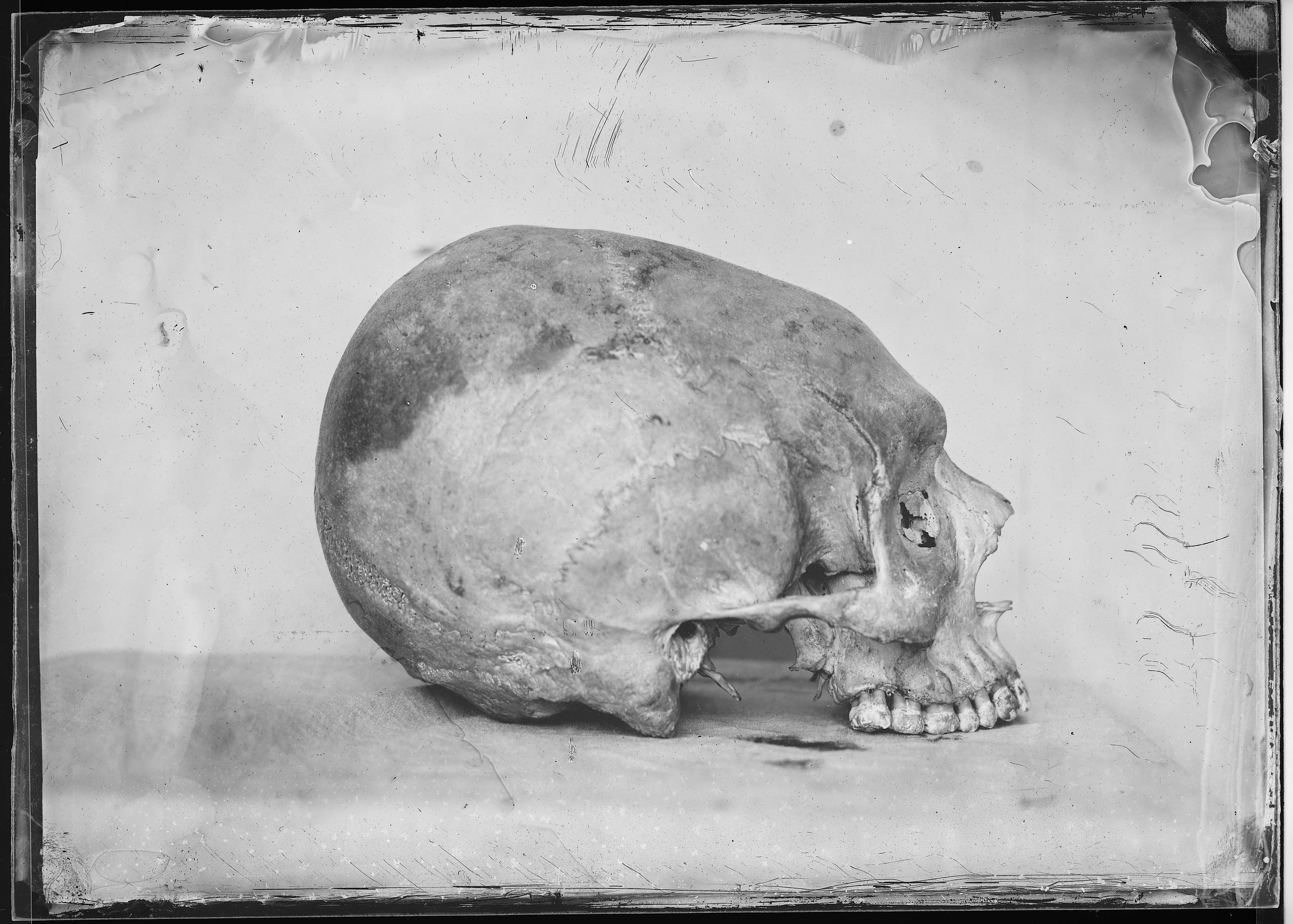
Crâne déformé

15.000 photographs are preserved in the Photographic Library of the Museum of Toulouse.
