= Gaussen Index =

Method of calculating aridity

The Gaussen Index (or Bagnouls-Gaussen Index) or xerothermic index is a method of calculating and comparing aridity.

According to Henri Gaussen (French botanist and biogeographer), a given period is said to be arid, when: $P < {2 \times T}$.

(P: total precipitation in millimeters over the given period, T: average temperature in °C over the given period)

The resulting index number indicates the number of biologically dry days in a year for a given location (it therefore ranges between 0 and 365). The data includes not only precipitation stricto sensu but also fog, dew and humidity of the air.

In general, it is accepted that an environment is non-arid when the index is less than 100, semi-arid between 100 and 290, arid between 290 and 350, and hyperarid between 350 and 365.

This index is very useful for the use of an ombrothermic diagram, the latter always constructed on the scale model: 1 °C = 2 mm precipitation.

Other indices such as the Louis Emberger rainfall quotient (which is not unique) have been defined. However, the Gaussen index which is simple and precise is still preferable. Indeed Henri Gaussen defines precisely the 4 nuances of Mediterranean climate just against this index, while Emberger defines the level of humidity in a region of Mediterranean climate but does not support precisely this Mediterranean climate.

The calculation does not reflect reality because it is based on averages. For example, according to the calculation, we find a total of 0 biologically dry days in Lyon, for 60 biologically dry days in Marseille.

== Bibliography ==
- Gaussen, Henri; F., Bagnouls (12 January 1952). "L'indice xérothermique" [The xerothermic index]. Bulletin de l'Association de géographes français (in French). 29 (222–223): 10–16. doi:10.3406/bagf.1952.7361.
- Gaussen, Henri; Bagnouls, F. (1953). Saison sèche et indice xérothermique [Dry seasons and the Xerothermic index] (in French). University of Toulouse, Faculty of Sciences. OCLC 893798321.
- Gaussen, Henri; Bagnouls, F. (1957). "Les climats biologiques et leur classification" [Biological climates and their classification]. Annales de Géographie (in French). 6 (355): 193–220. doi:10.3406/geo.1957.18273.
