= Henri Gaussen =

French botanist (1891–1981)

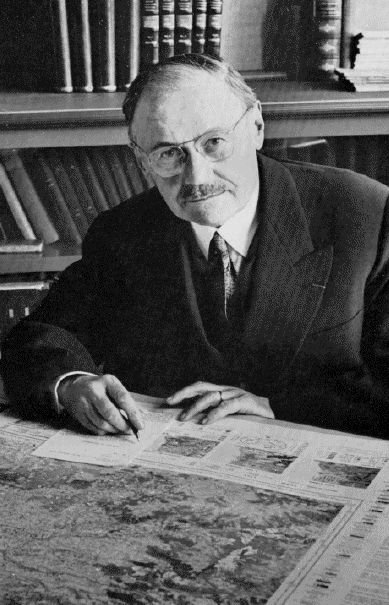
- Born: 14 July 1891; Cabrières-d'Aigues
- Died: 27 July 1981 (aged 90); Toulouse
- Scientific career
- Fields: Botany, geography
- Institutions: University of Toulouse
- Author abbrev. (botany): Gaussen

Marcel-Henri Gaussen (14 July 1891 in Cabrières-d'Aigues (Vaucluse) – 27 July 1981 in Toulouse), was a French botanist and biogeographer.

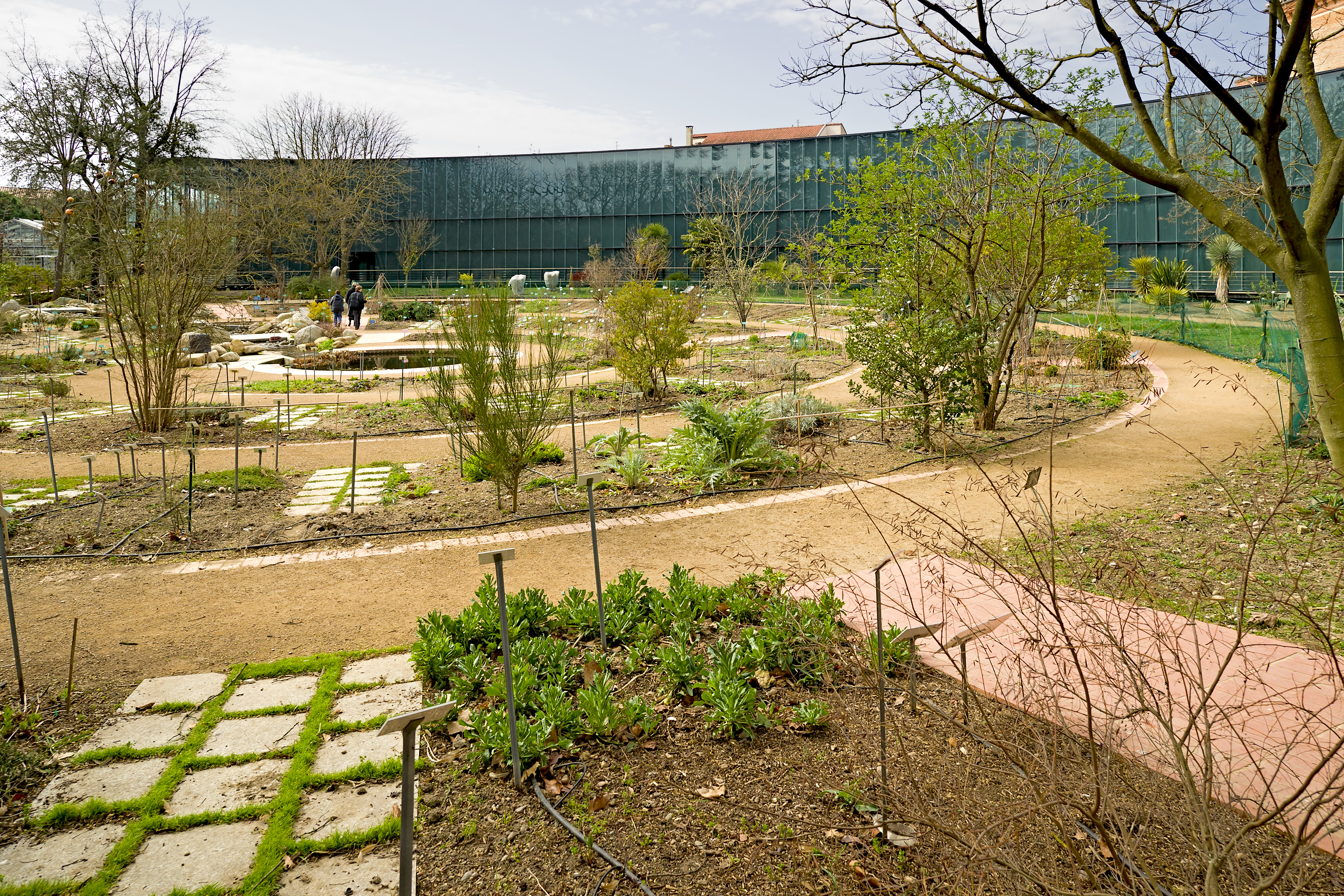
Muséum de Toulouse - Jardin botanique Henri Gaussen - La spirale ethnobotanique.

In 1926, he defended his thesis on "the vegetation of the eastern half of the Pyrenees", which laid the foundation for future work on the border between biogeography and vegetation mapping. Gaussen was an early advocate of the ideas of stages and vegetation succession, which are fundamental to phytogeography. His work allowed for the production of a vegetation map of France at a scale of 1/200 000 (completed after his death by the service of the CNRS, but which he had created and directed) and many similar projects in other countries. His work led to many advanced phytogeographic tools such as the xerothermic or Gaussen Index, and the "ombrothermic diagram". As recognition for his scientific work in mapping of vegetation cover and ecology, he received the Grand Prix of the Geographical Society for geographical research and publications in 1971.

He was also responsible for the creation of the Arboretum de Jouéou in 1922, and for the strength and reputation of teaching and research in botany at the University of Toulouse. A great traveller, he was also the creator of a science section at the French Institute of Pondicherry. He worked with Flora Europaea as a regional adviser for France.

Henri Gaussen spent his entire career as a professor at Toulouse, where he was also in 1958 elected as a "mainteneur" (council member) of the Académie des Jeux floraux.

Having accumulated an impressive number of personal photographs, he donated his collection to the archives of the department of Haute-Garonne, where they can still be viewed.

== Principal publications ==
- Gaussen, Henri (1927). "Les cultures en terrasses dans le bassin méditerranéen occidental" [Terraced crops in the western Mediterranean basin]. Annales de géographie (in French). tome 36 (201): 276–278. doi:10.3406/geo.1927.8778.
- Gaussen, Henri (1933). Géographie des Plantes [Plant Geography] (in French). Paris: Librairie Armand Colin. OCLC 5246885. (222 pages, 8 maps and figures)
- Gaussen, Henri (1946). "Les gymnospermes actuelles et fossiles" [Current and fossil gymnosperms]. Travaux du laboratoire forestier de Toulouse (in French). 2.
- Gaussen, Henri (February 1950). "Le dynamisme des biocénoses végétales" [The dynamism of plant biocenoses]. Colloque international du CNRS sur l'écologie. (in French). CNRS.
- Gaussen, Henri; Bagnouls, F. (1953). Saison sèche et indice xérothermique (in French). University of Toulouse, Faculty of Sciences. OCLC 893798321.
- Gaussen, Henri; Barreul, Paul (1955). Montagnes, la vie aux hautes altitudes [Mountains, life at high altitudes] (in French). Paris: Horizons de France. OCLC 797579874.
- Gaussen, Henri (December 1966), "Habitations humaines dans les Pyrénées et les Alpes" [Human dwellings in the Pyrenees and the Alps], La Montagne (in French), Club alpin français

== Eponymy ==
genus

- (Podocarpaceae) Gaussenia A.V.Bobrov & Melikyan

Species

- (Aizoaceae) Opophytum gaussenii (Leredde) H.Jacobsen ex Greuter & Burdet
- (Araliaceae) Brassaiopsis gaussenii Bui
- (Asteraceae) Leontodon gaussenii Sennen
- (Campanulaceae) Phyteuma gaussenii Chouard
- (Cupressaceae) Juniperus gaussenii Cheng
- (Elaeocarpaceae) Elaeocarpus gaussenii Weibel
- (Moraceae) Dorstenia gaussenii J.Troch. & Koechl.
- (Pinaceae) Pseudotsuga gaussenii Flous
- (Podocarpaceae) Afrocarpus gaussenii (Woltz) C.N.Page
- (Ulmaceae) Ulmus gaussenii W. C. Cheng

== Honours ==
- The Henri Gaussen Prize

Presented by the Académie des sciences, inscriptions et belles-lettres de Toulouse, this prize is awarded annually for a scientific work on the Pyrenees mountain range.

- The City of Toulouse honours him with the Boulevard Henri Gaussen, in the Minimes quarter.
