= Natural History Museum, Dijon =

Coordinates: 47°19′19″N 5°01′44″E

- Muséum d'histoire naturelle de Dijon
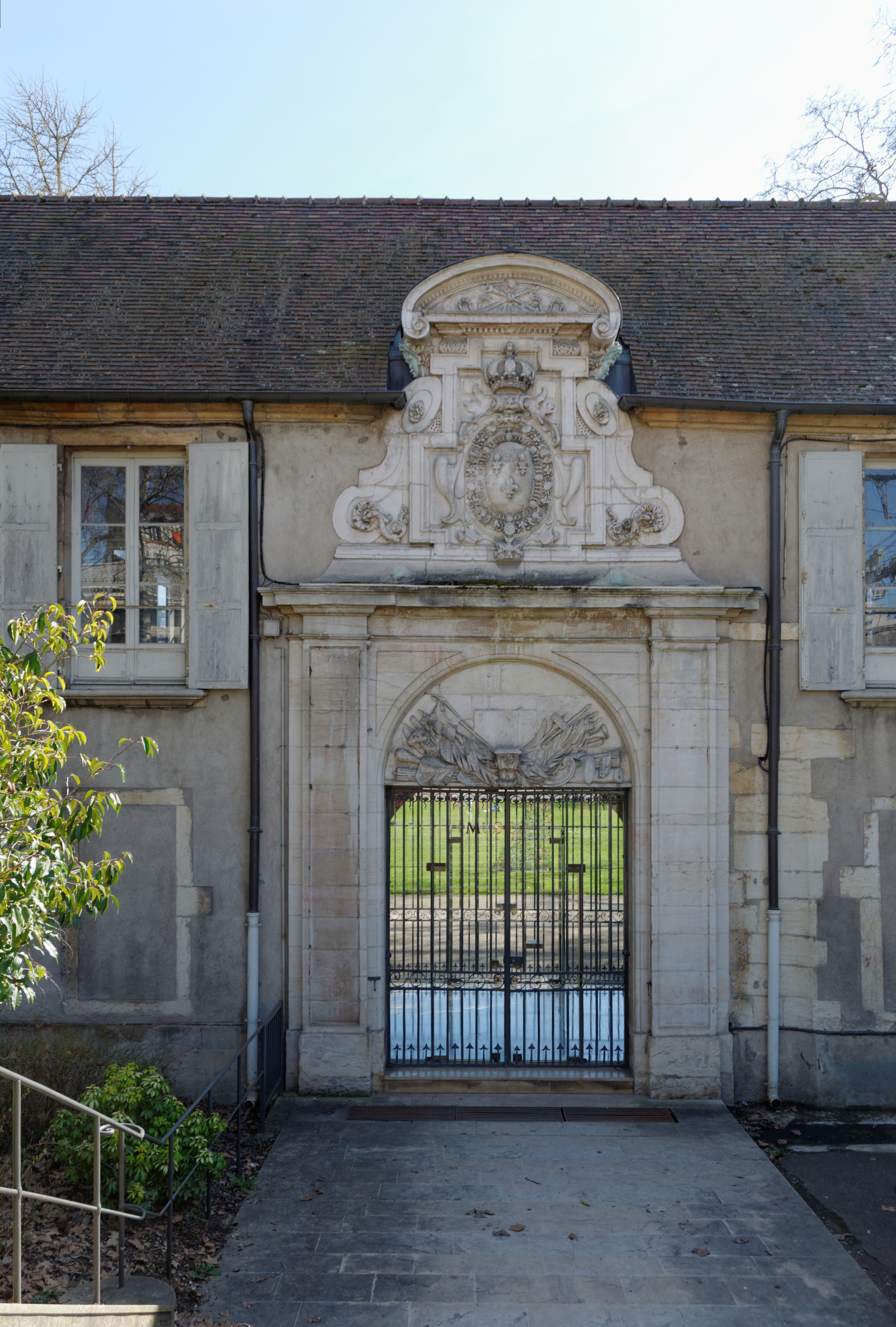
- Visitors: 121 798 (2015); 109 158 (2016); 122 825 (2017)

The Natural History Museum of Dijon (French: Muséum d'histoire naturelle de Dijon) is a natural history museum located in the Parc de l'Arquebuse, in Dijon, France. It is one of the three entities that make up the Jardin des Sciences, along with the Hubert Curien Planetarium and the Botanical Garden of Arquebuse.

== History ==
The Dijon museum was founded in 1836 by the naturalist Léonard Nodot. Its premises are established in the former pavilion of Arquebuse, former barracks of arquebusiers built around 1608.

Later, the municipality of Dijon built a Planetarium. These two buildings now form a scientific center bringing together the sciences of the Earth, Nature and the Universe.

The Planetarium welcomes around 100,000 visitors a year, including a large school population. It opened its doors on September 9, 2005 with a capacity of 70 seats; it has been designed for both schoolchildren and the general public. There are various experimental activities, multimedia workshops, meetings with the world of research, via conferences, videoconferences, screenings, debates, exhibitions. It is open to all public.
