= County of Nice =

Historical region now part of France

Coordinates: 43.70°N 7.27°E

County of Nice Contèa de Niça (Provençal) Contea di Nizza (Italian) Comté de Nice (French) Comitatus Nicaeensis (Medieval Latin)
- 1388–1860
- Flag (variants) Coat of arms

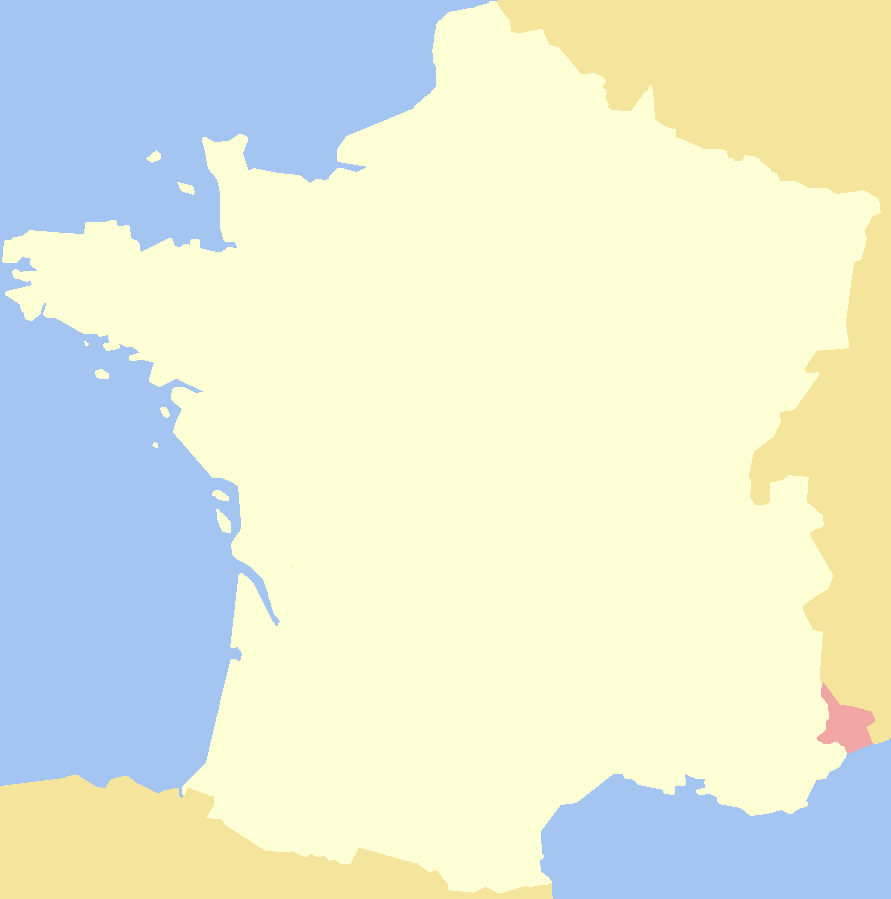
- The county inside modern France.
- Status: County within the Savoyard state
- Capital: Nice
- Common languages: Niçard, Italian, French
- Religion: Roman Catholicism
- History
  - Dedication of Nice to Savoy: 1388
  - Part of County of Savoy: 1388–1416
  - Part of Savoyard State: 1416–1720
  - Part of Sardinia-Piedmont-Savoy: 1720–1796
  - French conquest: 1796–1814
  - Part of Kingdom of Sardinia: 1814–1860
  - Perfect Fusion: 1847
  - Treaty of Turin: 1860
- Currency: Piedmontese scudo (to 1816); French franc (1800–1814); Sardinian lira (1816–1848)
Preceded by	Succeeded by
County of Provence	France
- Today part of: Provence-Alpes-Côte d'Azur, France

The County of Nice (French: Comté de Nice / Pays Niçois; Italian: Contea di Nizza / Paese Nizzardo; Niçard Occitan: Contèa de Niça / País Niçard) was a historical region of France and Italy located around the southeastern city of Nice and roughly equivalent to the modern arrondissement of Nice. It was part of the Savoyard state.

== History ==
Its territory lies between the Mediterranean Sea (Côte d'Azur), Var River and the southernmost crest of the Alps.

Ligurian tribes populated the County of Nice prior to its occupation by the Romans. These tribes, conquered by Augustus, had become fully Romanized (according to Theodore Mommsen) by the 4th century, when the barbarian invasions began.

The Franks conquered the region after the Fall of the Western Roman Empire, and the local Romance populations became integrated within the County of Provence, with a period of independence as a maritime republic (1108–1176). It was initially a semi-autonomous part of the ancient County of Provence.

=== The domain of the House of Savoy (1388–1860) ===
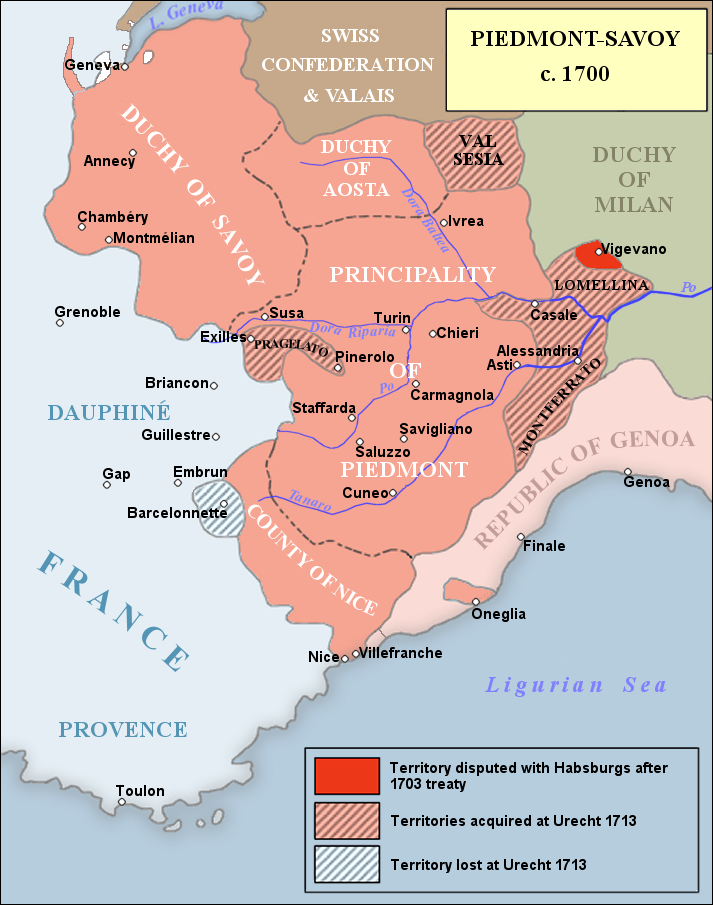
The County of Nice as part of the Savoyard State.

Nice became part of the domains of the House of Savoy on 28 September 1388, with which Amadeus VII, Count of Savoy, taking advantage of the internal struggles in Provence, negotiated with Giovanni Grimaldi, baron of Boglio (governor of Nice and the Eastern Provence) the passage of Nice and the Ubaye Valley to the Savoy domains, with the name of Terre Nuove di Provenza. The Terre Nuove then took the name of County of Nice in 1526, where in this context the term "county" was used in an administrative and not a feudal sense.

On 25 October 1561, following the Edict of Rivoli, Italian replaced Latin as the language for drafting the official documents of the County of Nice.

Charles Emmanuel I, Duke of Savoy, made Nice a free port in 1614 and established a senate there. The revolt of the count of Boglio was put down in 1621 and from that moment the county experienced a period of stability, unlike the nearby Provence battered by the revolts. Hostilities with France recommenced during the 17th century and the county was subjected to French occupation twice (1691–1697 and 1707–1713).

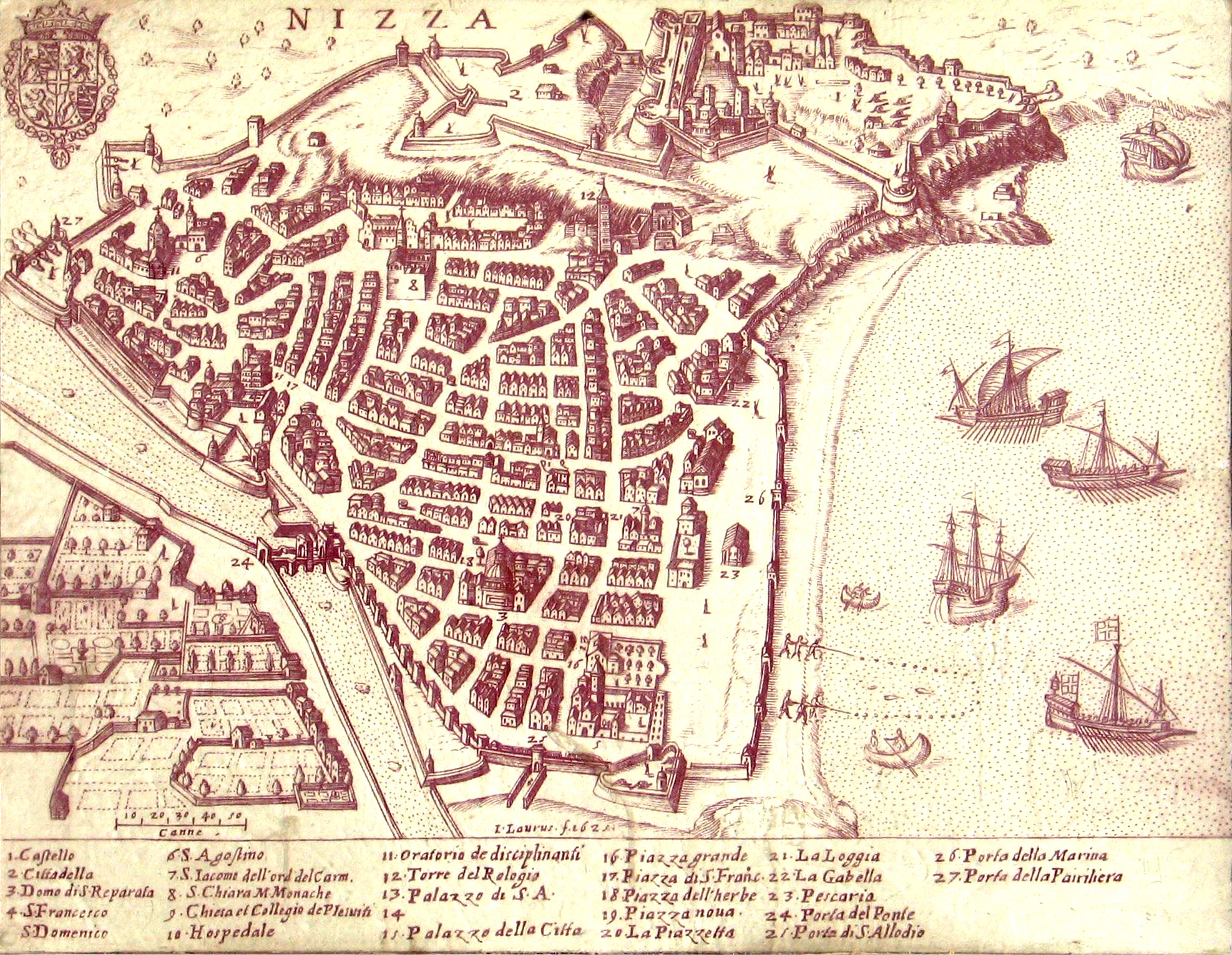
Nice in 1624, when it was called Nizza

During the 18th century the border between the county of Nice and France was rectified several times. The first time in 1718, when Victor Amadeus II of Sardinia repurchased the upper Varo valley with Entraunes and Saint-Martin-d'Entraunes in exchange for municipality of Le Mas, and a second time with the Treaty of Turin of 24 March 1760, with which the Savoys ceded Gattières and the right bank of the Esterone river to France, in exchange for the areas of Guglielmi and La Penna, which passed to Savoyard possessions.

In 1789, Nice was a counter-revolutionary center; the Army of the Midi of the young French Republic, under the command of General Jacques Bernard d'Anselme, entered the city on 29 September 1792. The following 31 January, the National Convention ordered the integration of the county into French territory and the creation of the Alpes-Maritimes department. During the period of the French occupation, the popular movement of barbetism was active in the territory of the County, loyal to the House of Savoy.

On 23 April 1814 the county returned under the control of the King Victor Emmanuel I of Sardinia, while the Principality of Monaco passed from the French to the Sardinian protectorate. With the outbreak of national uprisings of 1848, the Monegasque towns of Menton and Roquebrune rebelled against their prince and became free cities administered by the House of Savoy, the Free Cities of Menton and Roquebrune.

=== Annexation to France (1860) ===
A map of the County of Nice showing the area of the Kingdom of Sardinia annexed in 1860 to France (light brown). The area in red had already become part of France before 1860.

After the Treaty of Turin was signed in 1860 between the Victor Emmanuel II of Sardinia and Napoleon III as a consequence of the Plombières Agreement, the county was again and definitively ceded to France as a territorial reward for French assistance in the Second Italian War of Independence against Austria, which saw Lombardy united with the Kingdom of Sardinia. King Victor-Emmanuel II, on 1 April 1860, solemnly asked the population to accept the change of sovereignty, in the name of Italian unity, and the cession was ratified by a regional referendum. Italophile manifestations and the acclamation of an "Italian Nice" by the crowd were reported on this occasion. A referendum was held on 15 and 16 April 1860. The opponents of annexation called for abstention, hence the very high abstention rate. The "yes" vote won 83% of registered voters throughout the county of Nice, and 86% in Nice, partly due to pressure from the authorities. This was the result of a masterful operation of information control by the French and Piedmontese governments, to influence the outcome of the vote in relation to the decisions already taken. The irregularities in the referendum voting operations were evident. The case of Levens is emblematic: the same official sources recorded, faced with only 407 voters, 481 votes cast, naturally almost all in favor of joining France.

The Italian language was the official language of the County, used by the Church, the town hall, taught in schools, used in theaters and at the Opera; though it was immediately abolished and replaced by French. Discontent over annexation to France led to the emigration of a large part of the Italophile population, also accelerated by Italian unification after 1861. A quarter of the population of Nice, around 11,000 people from Nice, decided to voluntarily exile themselves to Italy. The emigration of a quarter of the Niçard Italians to Italy was known as the Niçard exodus. Many Italians from Nice then moved to the Ligurian towns of Ventimiglia, Bordighera and Ospedaletti, giving rise to a local branch of the movement of the Italian irredentists which considered the reacquisition of Nice to be one of their nationalist goals. Giuseppe Garibaldi, born in Nice, strongly opposed the cession to France, arguing that the ballot was rigged by the French. Furthermore, for the niçard general his hometown was unquestionably Italian. Politically, the liberals of Nice and the partisans of Garibaldi also appreciated very little Napoleonic authoritarianism. Elements on the right (aristocrats) as on the left (Garibaldians) therefore wanted Nice to return to Italy. Savoy was also transferred to the French crown by similar means.

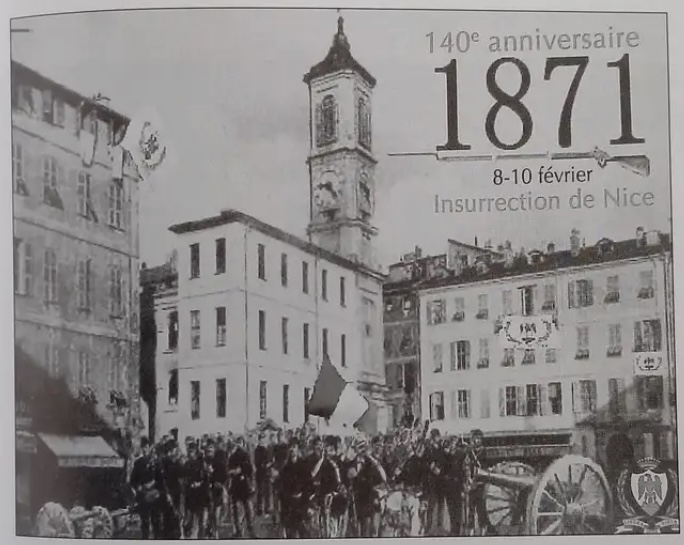
Pro-Italian protests in Nice, 1871, during the Niçard Vespers

In 1871, during the first free elections in the County, the pro-Italian lists obtained almost all the votes in the legislative elections (26,534 votes out of 29,428 votes cast), and Garibaldi was elected deputy at the National Assembly. Pro-Italians take to the streets cheering "Viva Nizza! Viva Garibaldi!" The French government sent 10,000 soldiers to Nice, closed the Italian newspaper Il Diritto di Nizza and imprisoned several demonstrators. The population of Nice rose from 8 to 10 February, and the three days of demonstration became known as "Niçard Vespers". The revolt was suppressed by French troops. On 13 February, Garibaldi was not allowed to speak at the French parliament meeting in Bordeaux to ask for the reunification of Nice to the newborn Italian unitary state, and he resigned from his post as deputy. The failure of Vespers led to the expulsion of the last pro-Italian intellectuals from Nice, such as Luciano Mereu or Giuseppe Bres, who were expelled or deported.

The pro-Italian irredentist movement persisted throughout 1860–1914, despite the repression carried out since the annexation. The French government implemented a policy of Francization of society, language and culture. The toponyms of the communes of the ancient County have been francized, with the obligation to use French in Nice, as well as certain surnames (for example the Italian surname "Bianchi" was francized into "Leblanc", and the Italian surname "Del Ponte" was francized into "Dupont").

Italian-language newspapers in Nice were banned. In 1861, La Voce di Nizza was closed (temporarily reopened during the Niçard Vespers), followed by Il Diritto di Nizza, closed in 1871. In 1895, it was the turn of Il Pensiero di Nizza, accused of irredentism. Many journalists and writers from Nice wrote in these newspapers in Italian. Among these are Enrico Sappia, Giuseppe André, Giuseppe Bres, Eugenio Cais di Pierlas and others.

=== 20th century ===
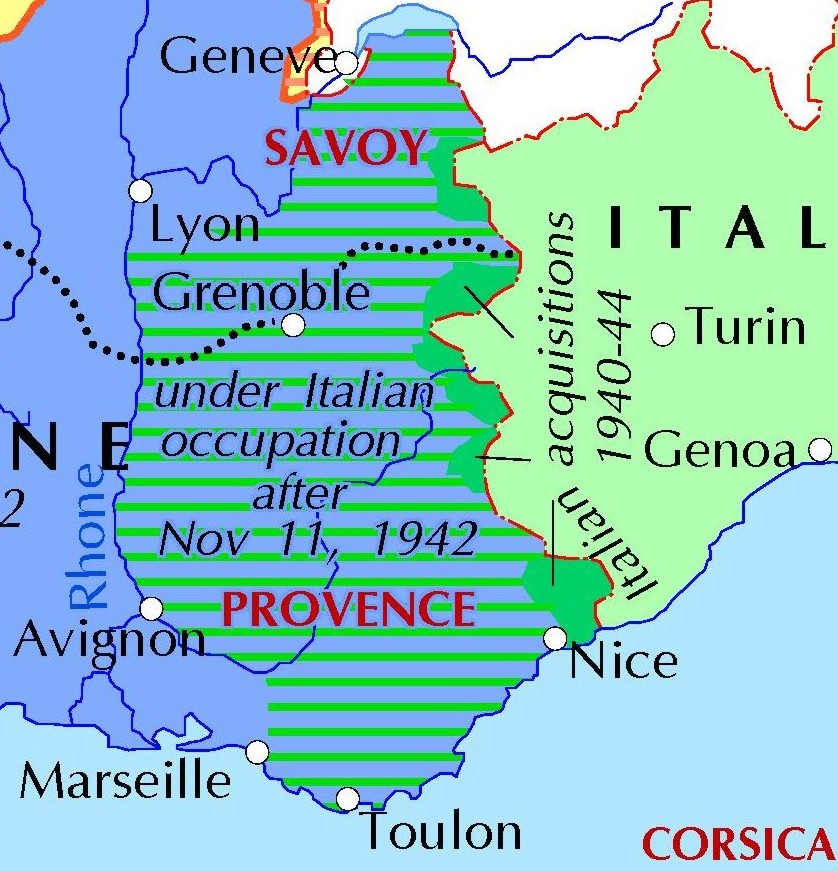
Italian occupation of France (1940–1943) during World War II

Benito Mussolini considered the annexation of Nice to be one of his main targets. In 1940, the County of Nice was occupied by the Italian army and the newspaper Il Nizzardo ("The Niçard") was restored there. It was directed by Ezio Garibaldi, grandson of Giuseppe Garibaldi. Only Menton was administered until 1943 as if it was an Italian territory, even if the Italian supporters of Italian irredentism in Nice wanted to create an Italian governorate (on the model of the Governorate of Dalmatia) up to the Var river or at least a "Province of the Western Alps".

The Italian occupation government was far less severe than that of Vichy France; thus, thousands of Jews took refuge there. For a while, Nice became an important mobilization center for various Jewish organizations. However, when the Italians signed the Armistice of Cassibile with the Allies, German troops invaded the region on 8 September 1943, and initiated brutal raids. Alois Brunner, the SS official for Jewish affairs, was placed at the head of units formed to search for Jews. Within five months, 5,000 Jews were caught and deported.

The area was returned to France following the war and in 1947, the areas of La Brigue and Tende, which had remained Italian after 1860 were ceded to France. Thereafter, a quarter of the Niçard Italians living in that mountainous area moved to Piedmont and Liguria in Italy (mainly from the Roya Valley and Tenda).

== Creation of Alpes-Maritimes ==
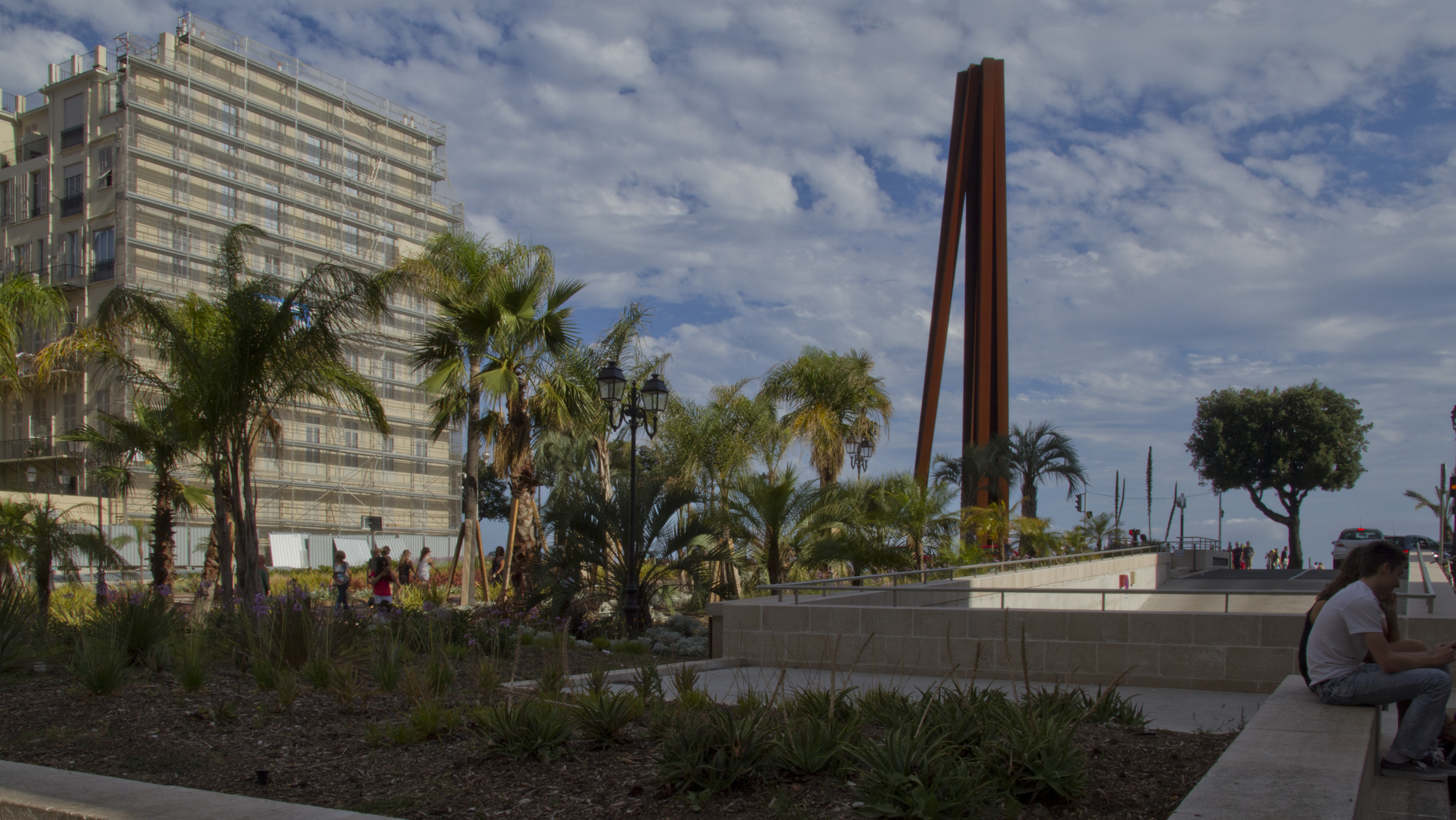
The statue Neuf Lignes Obliques on the Promenade des Anglais, that commemorates the 150th year of Nice's annexation to France

As the county was too small to form its own department, the Government of France added it to the arrondissement of Grasse, detached from the neighboring Var department, to create the Alpes-Maritimes department. Since 1926, the county has been largely coterminous with the arrondissement of Nice, one of two arrondissements of the Alpes-Maritimes, in the Provence-Alpes-Côte d'Azur region. Nevertheless, the term County of Nice (Countea de Nissa in Niçard dialect) continues to be in use to identify the territory as a distinct cultural and historical region, particularly to distinguish it from the neighboring Provence.

The historical language used by inhabitants of the County of Nice was Niçard, though it has been almost entirely supplanted by French since 1860. Since 2010, the statue Neuf Lignes Obliques on the Promenade des Anglais commemorates the 150th year of Nice's annexation.

== Francization of the toponyms of the municipalities of the County of Nice ==
The Francization of the toponyms of the municipalities of the County of Nice was the process, imposed by the French authorities, of replacing the official Italian toponyms with francized names for its 101 municipalities which formed the arrondissement of Nice after the annexation to France in 1861 following the Treaty of Turin (for some territories in 1947 following the Treaty of Paris).

Italian name	French name	Notes
Ascroso	Ascros	Scroso was also used in Italian.
Aspromonte di Nizza	Aspremont	
Auvara	Auvare	
Belluogo	Beaulieu-sur-Mer	
Belvedere	Belvédère	
Bendigiuno	Bendejun	
Berra	Berre-les-Alpes	Until 1997 Berre-des-Alpes.
Blausasco	Blausasc	Use of the Occitan name.
Boglio	Beuil	
Bolena	La Bollène-Vésubie	
Bonsone	Bonson	Use of the Occitan name.
Breglio	Breil-sur-Roya	Municipality annexed in 1861. In 1947 the frazioni of Piena and Libri were annexed, detached from the Italian municipality of Olivetta San Michele (province of Imperia).
Briga Marittima	La Brigue	Until 1947 in province of Cuneo it was known as from 1947 to 1976 as La Brigue de Nice.
Cantarone	Cantaron	
Castagnera	Castagniers	
Castellaro	Castellar	
Castelnuovo d'Entraunes	Châteauneuf-d'Entraunes	
Castelnuovo Villavecchia	Châteauneuf-Villevieille	
Castiglione di Mentone	Castillon	
Cigala	Sigale	Cigalla, Sigalla and Sigalle were also used in Italian.
Clanzo	Clans	Use of the Occitan name.
Coarazza	Coaraze	
Colomarte	Colomars	
Conti	Contes	
Daluis	Daluis	
Drappo	Drap	
Duranusso	Duranus	Duranuzzo was also used in Italian.
Eza	Èze	
Falicone	Falicon	Use of the Occitan name.
Giletta	Gilette	
Gorbio	Gorbio	Use of the Italian name.
Guglielmi	Guillaumes	
Ilonza	Ilonse	
Isola	Isola	Use of the Italian name. In 1976 the ski resort of Isola 2000 was founded.
La Penna	La Penne	
La Torre	La Tour	
Lantosca	Lantosque	
Levenzo	Levens	
Lieucia	Lieuche	
Lucerame	Lucéram	
Malaussena	Malaussène	
Maria	Marie	
Massone	Massoins	
Mentone	Menton	Until 1848, it was part of the Principality of Monaco, then part of the Free Cities of Menton and Roquebrune (1848) and later part of the County of Nice until 1860.
Molinetto	Moulinet	
Nizza	Nice	In Italian, Nizza Marittima and Nizza di Provenza were also used so as not to confuse it with the Italian municipality of Nizza Monferrato (province of Asti).
Peglio Marittimo	Peille	
Peglione	Peillon	
Peona	Péone	
Pietrafuoco	Pierrefeu	
Poggetto Tenieri	Puget-Théniers	
Quebris	Cuébris	
Rimplasso	Rimplas	
Robione	Roubion	
Roccabigliera	Roquebillière	Roccabellera was also used in Italian.
Roccabruna	Roquebrune-Cap-Martin	In Italian Roccabruna sul Capo Martino was also used. Up to 1848, it was part of the Principality of Monaco, then part of the Free Cities of Menton and Roquebrune (1848) and later of the County of Nice up to 1860.
Roccasterone	Roquesteron	
Rocchetta di Varo	La Roquette-sur-Var	
Rora	Roure	
San Biagio	Saint-Blaise	
San Dalmazzo Selvaggio	Saint-Dalmas-le-Selvage	San Dalmazzo Selvatico was also used in Italian.
San Giovanni sul Capo Ferrato	Saint-Jean-Cap-Ferrat	
San Legerio	Saint-Léger	
San Martino del Varo	Saint-Martin-du-Var	
San Martino d'Entraunes	Saint-Martin-d'Entraunes	
San Martino Lantosca	Saint-Martin-Vésubie	
San Salvatore di Tinea	Saint-Sauveur-sur-Tinée	
Sant'Andrea di Nizza	Saint-André-de-la-Roche	
Sant'Antonino	Saint-Antonin	
Santo Stefano di Tinea	Saint-Étienne-de-Tinée	
Saorgio	Saorge	
Scarena	L'Escarène	
Sospello	Sospel	
Tenda	Tende	Until 1947 in province of Cuneo.
Tieri	Thiéry	
Todone	Toudon	
Toetto di Scarena	Touët-de-l'Escarène	
Toetto di Boglio	Touët-sur-Var	Toetto sul Varo was also used in Italian.
Tornaforte	Tournefort	
Torretta Levenzo	Tourrette-Levens	
Trinità Vittorio	La Trinité	In Italian until 1861, it was called Trinità Vittorio in honor of the King of Sardinia Victor Emmanuel I of Sardinia.
Turbia	La Turbie	
Utello	Utelle	
Valdiblora	Valdeblore	
Venanzone	Venanson	
Villafranca Marittima	Villefranche-sur-Mer	
Villar del Varo	Villars-sur-Var	

== See also ==
- Bishopric of Nice
- Provence
- Italia irredenta
- Italian irredentism in Nice

== Sources ==
- Amicucci, Ermanno. Nizza e l'Italia. Mondadori Editore. Milano, 1939.
- Barelli Hervé, Rocca Roger. Histoire de l'identité niçoise, Nice: Serre, 1995. ISBN 2-86410-223-4
- "County of Nice (Traditional province, France)". flagspot.net. (flag/history).
