= René Vestri =

French politician

Senator, French Senate
- In office 21 September 2008 – 6 February 2013
- Constituency: Alpes-Maritimes

Mayor, Saint-Jean-Cap-Ferrat
- In office 2002 – 6 February 2013
- Preceded by: Honoré Toscan

Councillor, Alpes-Maritimes General Council
- In office 1985 – 6 February 2013
- Constituency: Canton of Villefranche-sur-Mer

Personal details
- Born: 25 October 1938 Saint-Jean-Cap-Ferrat, France
- Died: 6 February 2013 (aged 74)
- Party: UMP

René Vestri (25 October 1938 in Saint-Jean-Cap-Ferrat, France – 6 February 2013, in Paris) was a French politician. He was a member of the Senate of France for the Alpes-Maritimes department, a member of the General council of the Alpes-Maritimes and the mayor of Saint-Jean-Cap-Ferrat. He was a member of the Rassemblement pour la République (RPR) and of the Union for a Popular Movement (UMP).

In 2010 Vestri was indicted for money laundering, influence peddling and conspiracy. In 2011, in a separate corruption case, he received a suspended five-month prison sentence and a 3000 Euros fine.
