= Roquebillière =

Commune in Provence-Alpes-Côte d'Azur, France

- Commune
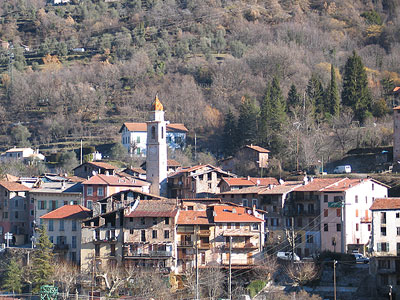
- A general view of the village, with the belfry in the middle

- Coat of arms
- Location of Roquebillière
- Location within France Location within Provence-Alpes-Côte d'Azur
- Coordinates: 44°00′43″N 7°18′27″E
- Country: France
- Region: Provence-Alpes-Côte d'Azur
- Department: Alpes-Maritimes
- Arrondissement: Nice
- Canton: Tourrette-Levens
- Intercommunality: Métropole Nice Côte d'Azur

Government
  - Mayor (2026–32): Gérard Manfredi
- Area^{1}: 25.92 km^{2} (10.01 sq mi)
- Highest elevation: 2,045 m (6,709 ft)
- Lowest elevation: 500 m (1,600 ft)
- Population (2023): 1,818
  - Density: 70.14/km^{2} (181.7/sq mi)
- Time zone: UTC+01:00 (CET)
  - Summer (DST): UTC+02:00 (CEST)
- INSEE/Postal code: 06103 /06450
- ^{1} French Land Register data, which excludes lakes, ponds, glaciers > 1 km^{2} (0.386 sq mi or 247 acres) and river estuaries.

Roquebillière (French pronunciation: [ʁɔkbiljɛʁ]; historical Italian: Roccabigliera; Occitan: Ròcabilhiera) is a commune in the Alpes-Maritimes department in southeastern France.

== History ==
It was part of the historic County of Nice until 1860 as Roccabigliere. The town was at one time a Templar settlement.

Arthur Koestler describes the town in August 1939 in the opening chapter of Scum of the Earth, his memoir of the Fall of France. He and two companions spent their last summer there before the outbreak of World War II while finishing his book Darkness at Noon.

== Population ==
Historical population
Year	Pop.	±% p.a.
1968	1,426	—
1975	1,336	−0.93%
1982	1,504	+1.71%
1990	1,539	+0.29%
1999	1,467	−0.53%
2007	1,634	+1.36%
2012	1,752	+1.40%
2017	1,841	+1.00%
2023	1,818	−0.21%
Source: INSEE

== See also ==
- Communes of the Alpes-Maritimes department
