= Arrondissement of Nice =

Coordinates: 43°42′N 7°16′E

Nice
- Arrondissement
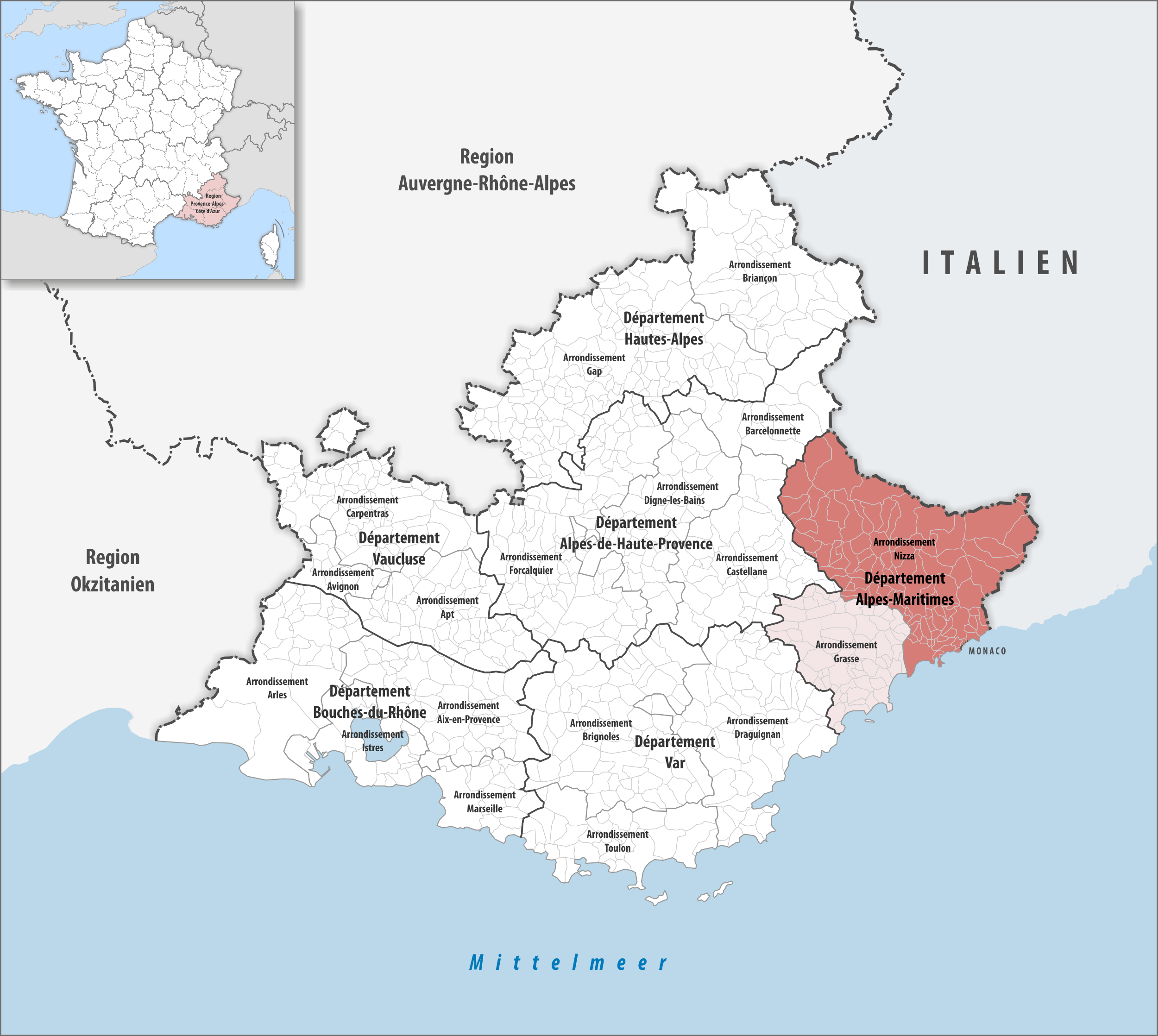
- Location within the region Provence-Alpes-Côte d'Azur
- Country: France
- Region: Provence-Alpes-Côte d'Azur
- Department: Alpes-Maritimes
- No. of communes: 101
- Area: 3,067.4 km^{2} (1,184.3 sq mi)
- Population (2023): 540,639
  - Density: 176.25/km^{2} (456.49/sq mi)
- INSEE code: 062

The arrondissement of Nice is an arrondissement of France in the Alpes-Maritimes department in the Provence-Alpes-Côte d'Azur region. It has 101 communes. Its population is 530,694 (2021), and its area is 3,067.4 km^{2} (1,184.3 sq mi).

== Composition ==
The communes of the arrondissement of Nice, and their INSEE codes, are:

1. Ascros (06005)
2. Aspremont (06006)
3. Auvare (06008)
4. Bairols (06009)
5. Beaulieu-sur-Mer (06011)
6. Beausoleil (06012)
7. Belvédère (06013)
8. Bendejun (06014)
9. Berre-les-Alpes (06015)
10. Beuil (06016)
11. Blausasc (06019)
12. La Bollène-Vésubie (06020)
13. Bonson (06021)
14. Breil-sur-Roya (06023)
15. La Brigue (06162)
16. Cantaron (06031)
17. Cap-d'Ail (06032)
18. Castagniers (06034)
19. Castellar (06035)
20. Castillon (06036)
21. Châteauneuf-d'Entraunes (06040)
22. Châteauneuf-Villevieille (06039)
23. Clans (06042)
24. Coaraze (06043)
25. Colomars (06046)
26. Contes (06048)
27. La Croix-sur-Roudoule (06051)
28. Cuébris (06052)
29. Daluis (06053)
30. Drap (06054)
31. Duranus (06055)
32. Entraunes (06056)
33. L'Escarène (06057)
34. Èze (06059)
35. Falicon (06060)
36. Fontan (06062)
37. Gilette (06066)
38. Gorbio (06067)
39. Guillaumes (06071)
40. Ilonse (06072)
41. Isola (06073)
42. Lantosque (06074)
43. Levens (06075)
44. Lieuche (06076)
45. Lucéram (06077)
46. Malaussène (06078)
47. Marie (06080)
48. Massoins (06082)
49. Menton (06083)
50. Moulinet (06086)
51. Nice (06088)
52. Peille (06091)
53. Peillon (06092)
54. La Penne (06093)
55. Péone (06094)
56. Pierlas (06096)
57. Pierrefeu (06097)
58. Puget-Rostang (06098)
59. Puget-Théniers (06099)
60. Revest-les-Roches (06100)
61. Rigaud (06101)
62. Rimplas (06102)
63. Roquebillière (06103)
64. Roquebrune-Cap-Martin (06104)
65. Roquestéron (06106)
66. La Roquette-sur-Var (06109)
67. Roubion (06110)
68. Roure (06111)
69. Saint-André-de-la-Roche (06114)
70. Saint-Antonin (06115)
71. Saint-Blaise (06117)
72. Saint-Dalmas-le-Selvage (06119)
73. Sainte-Agnès (06113)
74. Saint-Étienne-de-Tinée (06120)
75. Saint-Jean-Cap-Ferrat (06121)
76. Saint-Léger (06124)
77. Saint-Martin-d'Entraunes (06125)
78. Saint-Martin-du-Var (06126)
79. Saint-Martin-Vésubie (06127)
80. Saint-Sauveur-sur-Tinée (06129)
81. Saorge (06132)
82. Sauze (06133)
83. Sigale (06135)
84. Sospel (06136)
85. Tende (06163)
86. Thiéry (06139)
87. Toudon (06141)
88. Touët-de-l'Escarène (06142)
89. Touët-sur-Var (06143)
90. La Tour (06144)
91. Tourette-du-Château (06145)
92. Tournefort (06146)
93. Tourrette-Levens (06147)
94. La Trinité (06149)
95. La Turbie (06150)
96. Utelle (06151)
97. Valdeblore (06153)
98. Venanson (06156)
99. Villars-sur-Var (06158)
100. Villefranche-sur-Mer (06159)
101. Villeneuve-d'Entraunes (06160)

== History ==
A map of the County of Nice showing the area of the Italian kingdom of Sardinia annexed in 1860 to France (light brown). The area in red had already become part of France before 1860.

The arrondissement of Nice is roughly equivalent to the ancient County of Nice, a historical region belonging first to the Duchy of Savoy and then to the Kingdom of Piedmont-Sardinia. Conquered in 1792 by the armies of the French First Republic, the County of Nice continued to be part of France until 1814; but after that date it reverted to the Kingdom of Piedmont-Sardinia. After the Treaty of Turin was signed in 1860 between the Sardinian king and Napoleon III as a consequence of the Plombières Agreement, the County of Nice was again and definitively ceded to France as a territorial reward for French assistance in the Second Italian War of Independence against Austria, which saw Lombardy united with Piedmont-Sardinia.

In particular, the arrondissement of Nice was created in 1800 during the first French annexation, disbanded in 1814 after the Treaty of Paris, when its territory returned to the Kingdom of Piedmonte-Sardinia, and restored in 1860 after the aforementioned Treaty of Turin. As a result of the reorganisation of the cantons of France which came into effect in 2015, the borders of the cantons are no longer related to the borders of the arrondissements. The cantons of the arrondissement of Nice were, as of January 2015:

1. Beausoleil
2. Breil-sur-Roya
3. Contes
4. L'Escarène
5. Guillaumes
6. Lantosque
7. Levens
8. Menton-Est
9. Menton-Ouest
10. Nice 1st Canton
11. Nice 2nd Canton
12. Nice 3rd Canton
13. Nice 4th Canton
14. Nice 5th Canton
15. Nice 6th Canton
16. Nice 7th Canton
17. Nice 8th Canton
18. Nice 9th Canton
19. Nice 10th Canton
20. Nice 11th Canton
21. Nice 12th Canton
22. Nice 13th Canton
23. Nice 14th Canton
24. Puget-Théniers
25. Roquebillière
26. Roquestéron
27. Saint-Étienne-de-Tinée
28. Saint-Martin-Vésubie
29. Saint-Sauveur-sur-Tinée
30. Sospel
31. Tende
32. Villars-sur-Var
33. Villefranche-sur-Mer
