= Canton of Tourrette-Levens =

Coordinates: 43.79°N 7.27°E

- Canton
- Situation of the canton of Tourrette-Levens in the department of Alpes-Maritimes
- Country: France
- Region: Provence-Alpes-Côte d'Azur
- Department: Alpes-Maritimes
- No. of communes: {{{nbcomm}}}
- Population (2023): 36,605
- INSEE code: 0624

The canton of Tourrette-Levens (French: Canton de Tourrette-Levens) is an administrative division of the southeastern Alpes-Maritimes department, Provence-Alpes-Côte d'Azur region, France. It was created at the French canton reorganisation which came into effect in March 2015. Its seat is in Tourrette-Levens. In the 2021 election, MP Éric Ciotti and Rimplas Mayor Christelle D'Intorni of The Republicans were elected.

It consists of the following communes:

1. Aspremont
2. Belvédère
3. La Bollène-Vésubie
4. Castagniers
5. Clans
6. Colomars
7. Duranus
8. Falicon
9. Ilonse
10. Isola
11. Lantosque
12. Levens
13. Marie
14. Rimplas
15. Roquebillière
16. Roubion
17. Roure
18. La Roquette-sur-Var
19. Saint-Blaise
20. Saint-Dalmas-le-Selvage
21. Saint-Étienne-de-Tinée
22. Saint-Martin-du-Var
23. Saint-Martin-Vésubie
24. Saint-Sauveur-sur-Tinée
25. Tourrette-Levens
26. Utelle
27. Valdeblore
28. Venanson
