= Neuf Lignes Obliques =

Steel monument in France by Bernar Venet

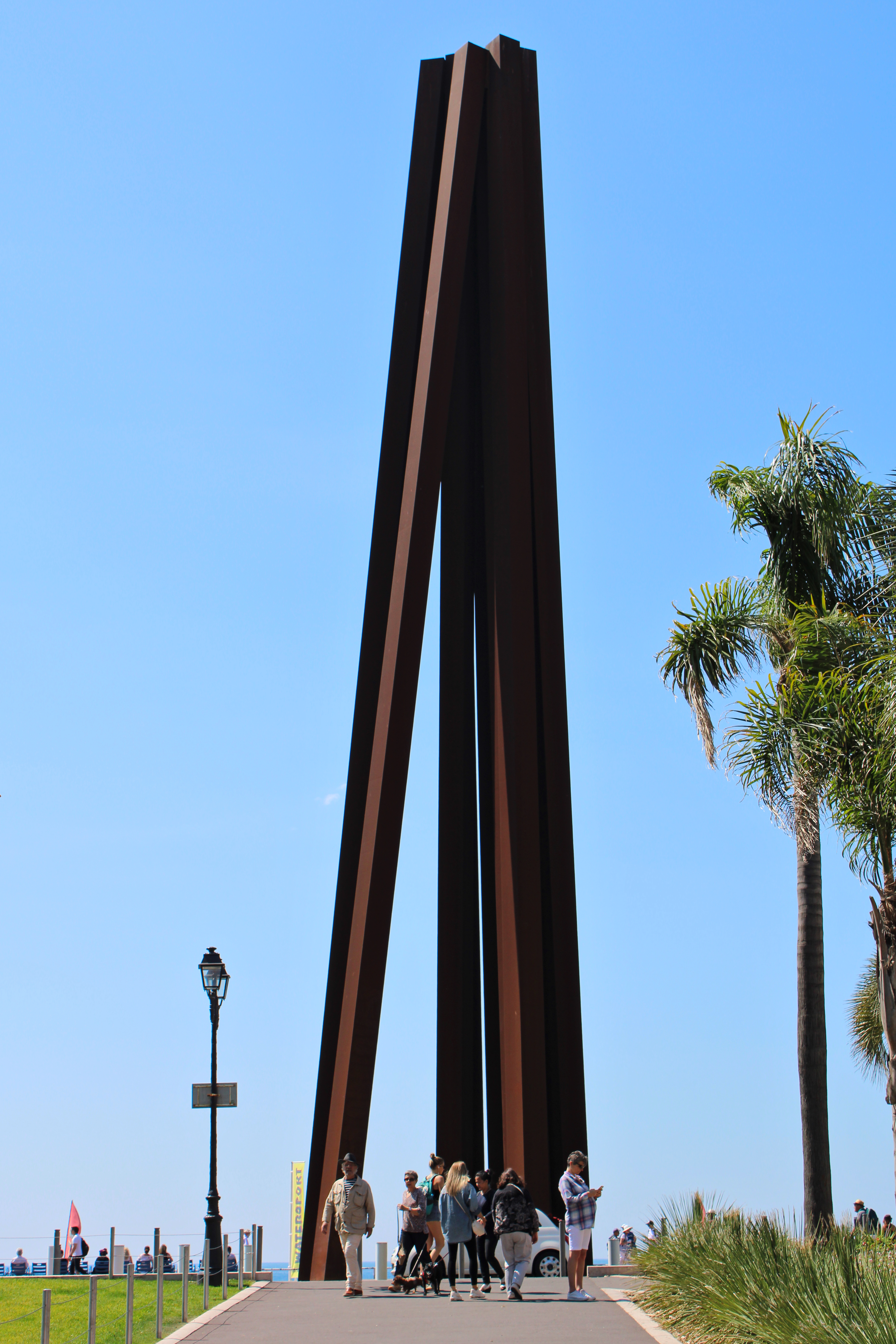
- Artist: Bernar Venet
- Year: 2010
- Medium: Corten Steel Sculpture
- Dimensions: 30 m (98 ft)
- Location: Promenade des Anglais, Nice, France
- 43.695325°N 7.271147°E

Neuf lignes obliques (English: Nine Oblique Lines) is a steel monument on the Promenade des Anglais, by French artist Bernar Venet. It was commissioned to mark the 150th anniversary of the 1860 annexation of the County of Nice by France.

The sculpture is made of nine steel beams, 30 metres long, which meet at their top. As the name implies the beams are inclined at an oblique angle. The sculpture is made of 65 tonnes of corten steel, set on a 130 tonne concrete foundation.

Neuf lignes obliques is between the George Pompidou esplanade, a square on the south side of Vieux-Nice, and the Promenade des Anglais on Nice's Mediterranean coast.

The Mayor of Nice, Christian Estrosi, commissioned it to symbolise the nine valleys of the old County of Nice as well as the surrounding mountains pointing to the sea. The sculpture was inaugurated on 31 May 2010 and moved 10m to its current site in 2012.
