= Rimplas =

Commune in Provence-Alpes-Côte d'Azur, France

- Commune
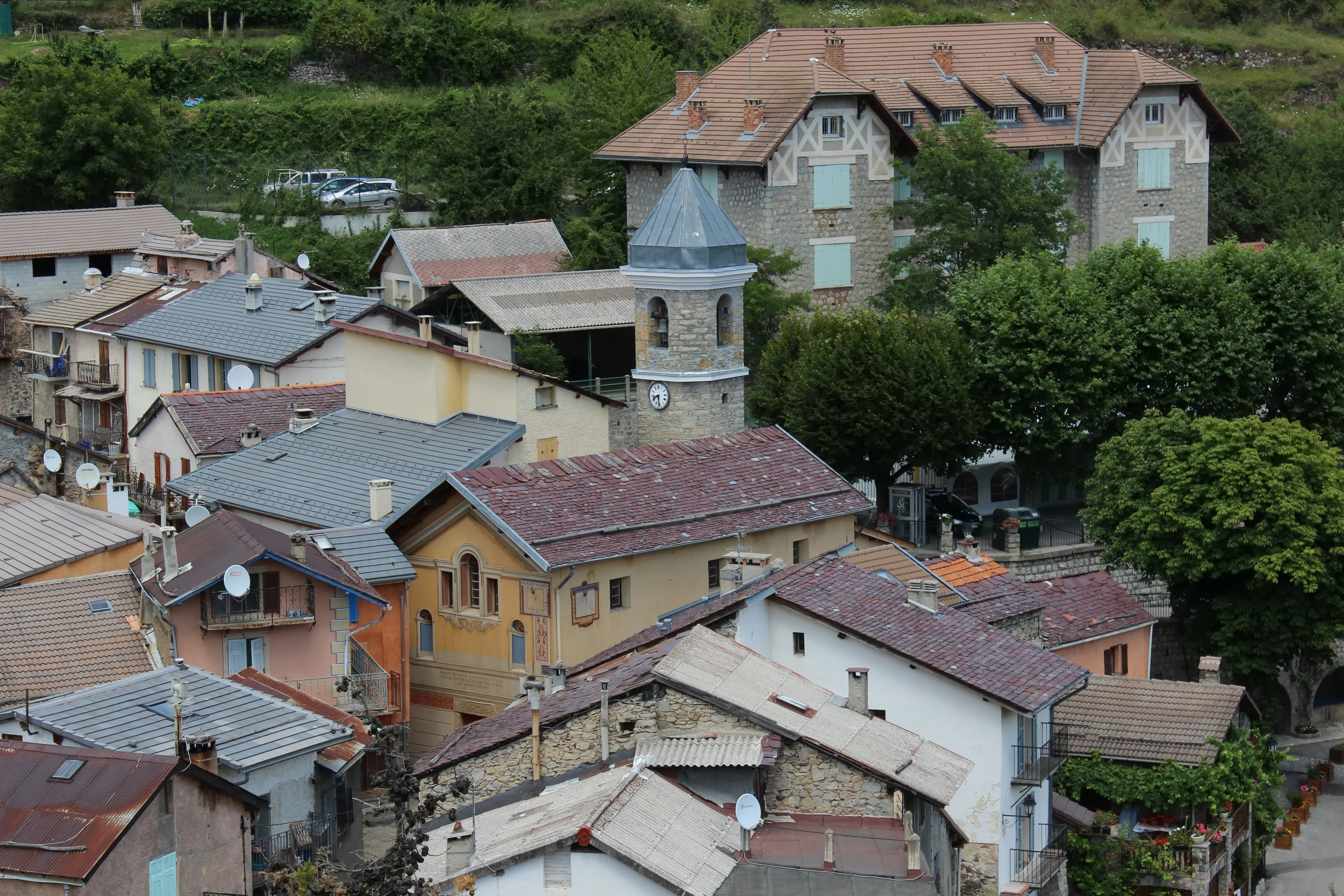
- Rimplas.

- Coat of arms
- Location of Rimplas
- Location within France Location within Provence-Alpes-Côte d'Azur
- Coordinates: 44°03′52″N 7°07′51″E
- Country: France
- Region: Provence-Alpes-Côte d'Azur
- Department: Alpes-Maritimes
- Arrondissement: Nice
- Canton: Tourrette-Levens
- Intercommunality: Métropole Nice Côte d'Azur

Government
  - Mayor (2026–32): Pascal Guglielmetti
- Area^{1}: 24.95 km^{2} (9.63 sq mi)
- Elevation: 1,000 m (3,300 ft)
- Highest elevation: 2,649 m (8,691 ft)
- Lowest elevation: 400 m (1,300 ft)
- Population (2023): 156
  - Density: 6.25/km^{2} (16.2/sq mi)
- Time zone: UTC+01:00 (CET)
  - Summer (DST): UTC+02:00 (CEST)
- INSEE/Postal code: 06102 /06420
- ^{1} French Land Register data, which excludes lakes, ponds, glaciers > 1 km^{2} (0.386 sq mi or 247 acres) and river estuaries.

Rimplas (French pronunciation: [ʁɛ̃plas]; Occitan: Rimplàs; Italian: Rimplasso) is a commune in the Alpes-Maritimes department in southeastern France.

== Population ==
Historical population
Year	Pop.	±% p.a.
1968	38	—
1975	55	+5.42%
1982	80	+5.50%
1990	84	+0.61%
1999	108	+2.83%
2007	114	+0.68%
2012	141	+4.34%
2017	91	−8.39%
2023	156	+9.40%
Source: INSEE

== See also ==
- Communes of the Alpes-Maritimes department
