= Ilonse =

Commune in Provence-Alpes-Côte d'Azur, France

- Commune
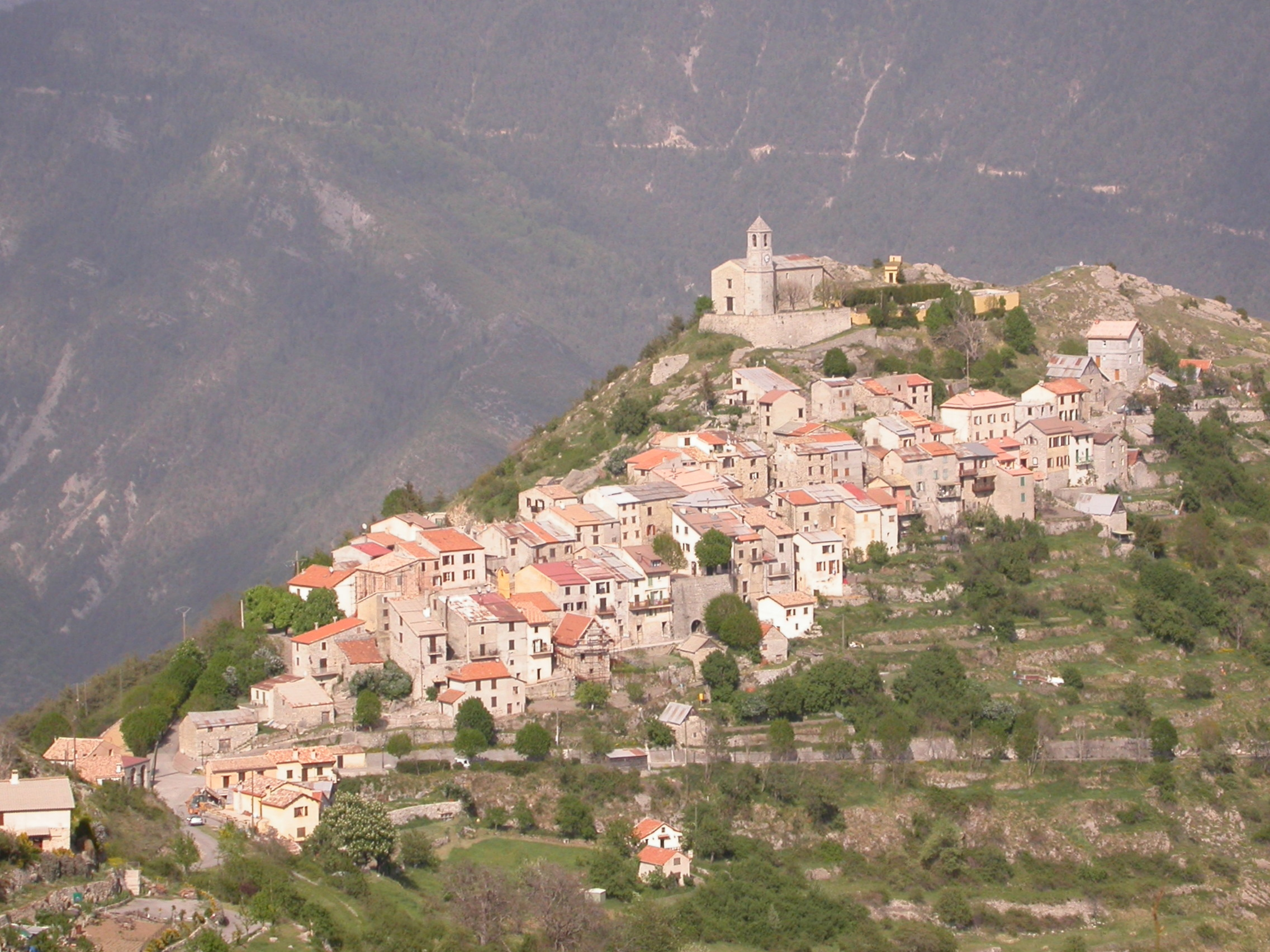
- A general view of the village of Ilonse

- Coat of arms
- Location of Ilonse
- Location within France Location within Provence-Alpes-Côte d'Azur
- Coordinates: 44°01′59″N 7°06′01″E
- Country: France
- Region: Provence-Alpes-Côte d'Azur
- Department: Alpes-Maritimes
- Arrondissement: Nice
- Canton: Tourrette-Levens
- Intercommunality: Métropole Nice Côte d'Azur

Government
  - Mayor (2026–32): Gérard Mario
- Area^{1}: 40.59 km^{2} (15.67 sq mi)
- Elevation: 1,256 m (4,121 ft)
- Highest elevation: 1,992 m (6,535 ft)
- Lowest elevation: 351 m (1,152 ft)
- Population (2023): 132
  - Density: 3.25/km^{2} (8.42/sq mi)
- Time zone: UTC+01:00 (CET)
  - Summer (DST): UTC+02:00 (CEST)
- INSEE/Postal code: 06072 /06420
- ^{1} French Land Register data, which excludes lakes, ponds, glaciers > 1 km^{2} (0.386 sq mi or 247 acres) and river estuaries.

Ilonse (French pronunciation: [ilɔ̃s]; Occitan: Ilonça; Italian: Ilonza) is a commune in the Alpes-Maritimes department in southeastern France.

== Population ==
Historical population
Year	Pop.	±% p.a.
1968	80	—
1975	57	−4.73%
1982	55	−0.51%
1990	78	+4.46%
1999	113	+4.20%
2007	147	+3.34%
2012	173	+3.31%
2017	193	+2.21%
2023	132	−6.14%
Source: INSEE

== See also ==
- Communes of the Alpes-Maritimes department
