= Roubion =

Commune in Provence-Alpes-Côte d'Azur, France

- Commune
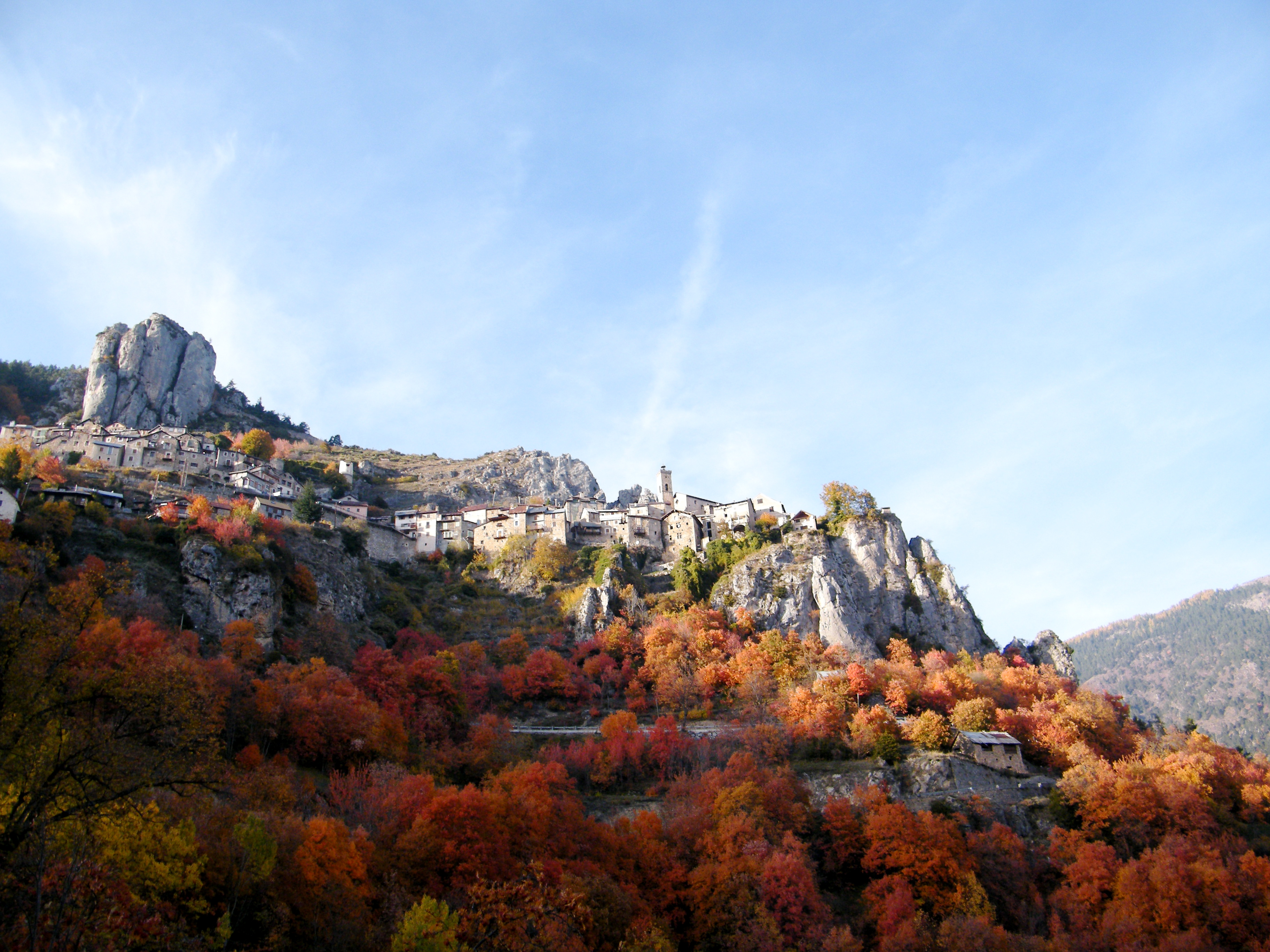
- The village of Roubion in Autumn

- Coat of arms
- Location of Roubion
- Location within France Location within Provence-Alpes-Côte d'Azur
- Coordinates: 44°05′37″N 7°03′04″E
- Country: France
- Region: Provence-Alpes-Côte d'Azur
- Department: Alpes-Maritimes
- Arrondissement: Nice
- Canton: Tourrette-Levens
- Intercommunality: Métropole Nice Côte d'Azur

Government
  - Mayor (2026–32): Philip Bruno
- Area^{1}: 27.26 km^{2} (10.53 sq mi)
- Highest elevation: 2,488 m (8,163 ft)
- Lowest elevation: 840 m (2,760 ft)
- Population (2023): 112
  - Density: 4.11/km^{2} (10.6/sq mi)
- Time zone: UTC+01:00 (CET)
  - Summer (DST): UTC+02:00 (CEST)
- INSEE/Postal code: 06110 /06420
- ^{1} French Land Register data, which excludes lakes, ponds, glaciers > 1 km^{2} (0.386 sq mi or 247 acres) and river estuaries.

Roubion (French pronunciation: [ʁubjɔ̃]; Occitan: Robion; Italian: Robione) is a commune in the Alpes-Maritimes department in southeastern France.

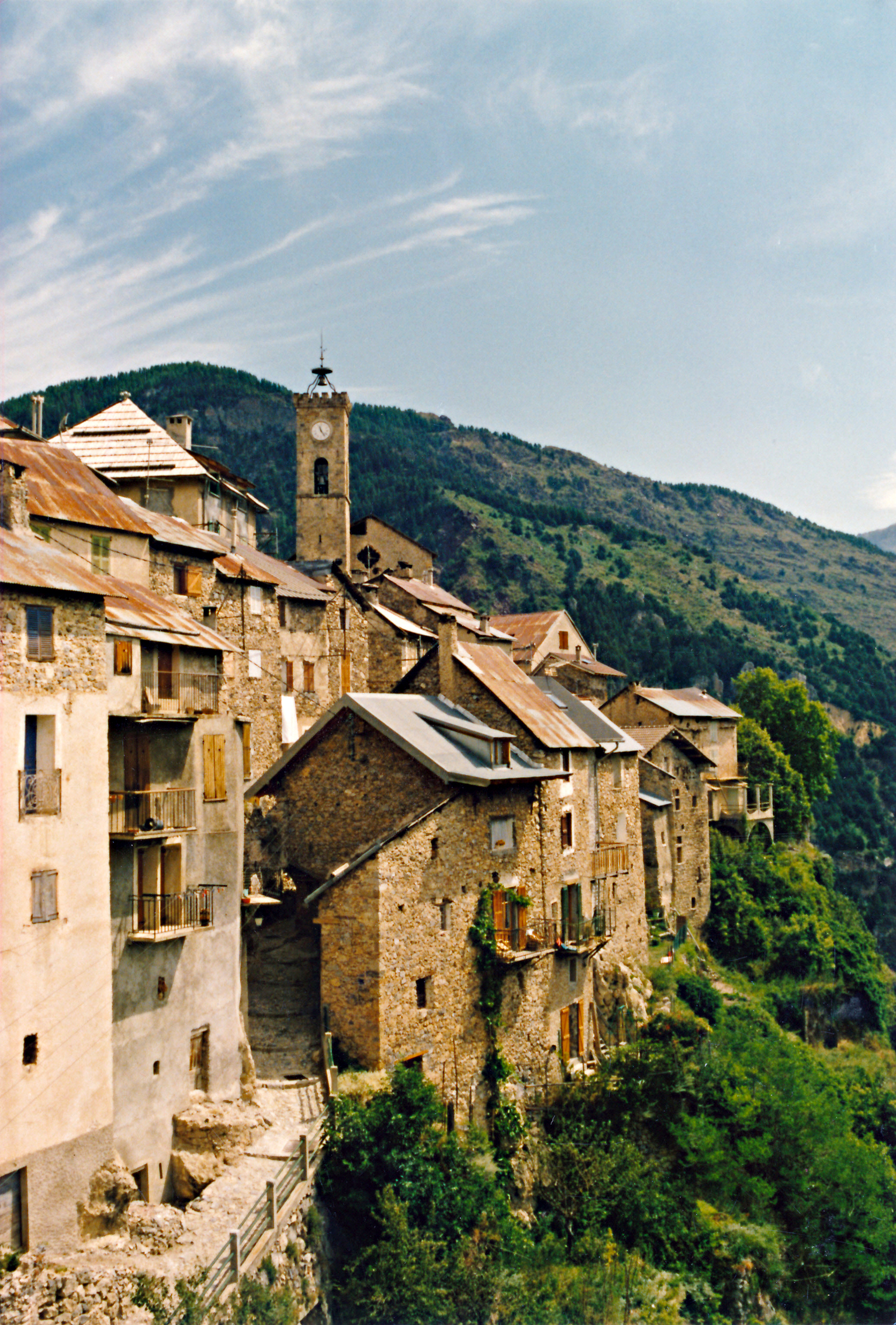
The village in the summer.

== Population ==
Historical population
| Year | Pop. | ±% p.a. |
|---|---|---|
| 1968 | 102 | — |
| 1975 | 62 | −6.86% |
| 1982 | 83 | +4.26% |
| 1990 | 105 | +2.98% |
| 1999 | 113 | +0.82% |
| 2007 | 108 | −0.56% |
| 2012 | 125 | +2.97% |
| 2017 | 121 | −0.65% |
| 2023 | 112 | −1.28% |
Source: INSEE

== See also ==
- Communes of the Alpes-Maritimes department
