= Thiéry, Alpes-Maritimes =

Commune in Provence-Alpes-Côte d'Azur, France

Thiéry Tièri (Occitan)
- Commune
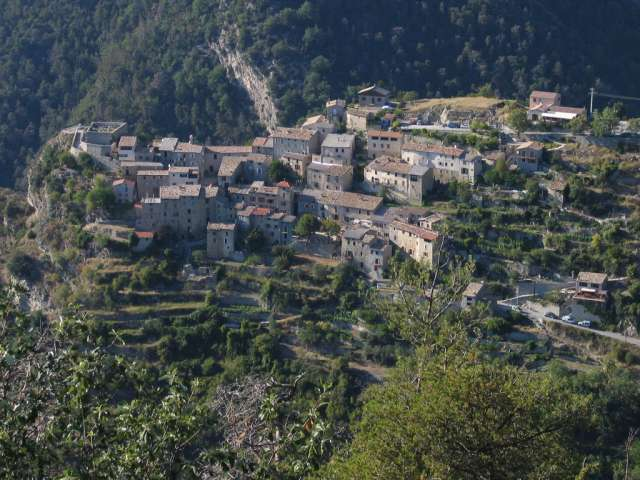
- A general view of the village of Thiéry

- Coat of arms
- Location of Thiéry
- Location within France Location within Provence-Alpes-Côte d'Azur
- Coordinates: 43°58′45″N 7°01′52″E
- Country: France
- Region: Provence-Alpes-Côte d'Azur
- Department: Alpes-Maritimes
- Arrondissement: Nice
- Canton: Vence

Government
  - Mayor (2026–32): Thierry Grandbouche
- Area^{1}: 22.24 km^{2} (8.59 sq mi)
- Elevation: 1,050 m (3,440 ft)
- Highest elevation: 1,783 m (5,850 ft)
- Lowest elevation: 351 m (1,152 ft)
- Population (2023): 91
  - Density: 4.1/km^{2} (11/sq mi)
- Time zone: UTC+01:00 (CET)
  - Summer (DST): UTC+02:00 (CEST)
- INSEE/Postal code: 06139 /06710
- ^{1} French Land Register data, which excludes lakes, ponds, glaciers > 1 km^{2} (0.386 sq mi or 247 acres) and river estuaries.

Thiéry (French pronunciation: [tjeʁi]; Occitan: Tièri; Italian: Tieri, formerly) is a rural commune in the Alpes-Maritimes department in the southeastern Provence-Alpes-Côte d'Azur region in France.

== Geography ==
The commune is traversed by the river Cians.

== Demographics ==
Historical population
Year	Pop.	±% p.a.
1968	57	—
1975	58	+0.25%
1982	71	+2.93%
1990	83	+1.97%
1999	93	+1.27%
2007	101	+1.04%
2012	104	+0.59%
2017	106	+0.38%
2023	91	−2.51%
Source: INSEE

== See also ==
- Communes of the Alpes-Maritimes department
