= La Penne =

Commune in Provence-Alpes-Côte d'Azur, France

- Commune
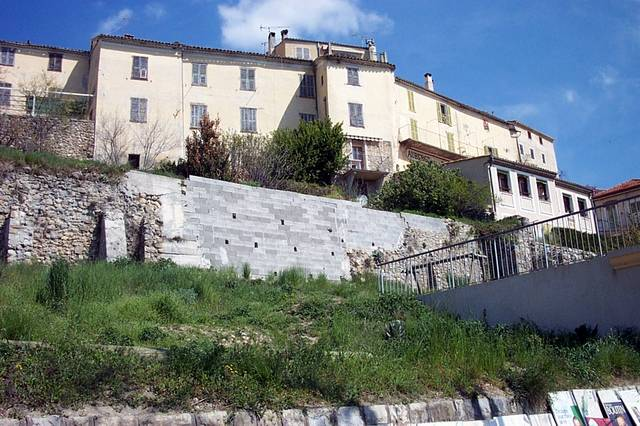
- A general view of the village

- Coat of arms
- Location of La Penne
- Location within France Location within Provence-Alpes-Côte d'Azur
- Coordinates: 43°55′40″N 6°56′53″E
- Country: France
- Region: Provence-Alpes-Côte d'Azur
- Department: Alpes-Maritimes
- Arrondissement: Nice
- Canton: Vence

Government
  - Mayor (2026–32): Marjorie Rosa
- Area^{1}: 18.08 km^{2} (6.98 sq mi)
- Elevation: 800 m (2,600 ft)
- Highest elevation: 1,436 m (4,711 ft)
- Lowest elevation: 520 m (1,710 ft)
- Population (2023): 254
  - Density: 14.0/km^{2} (36.4/sq mi)
- Time zone: UTC+01:00 (CET)
  - Summer (DST): UTC+02:00 (CEST)
- INSEE/Postal code: 06093 /06260
- ^{1} French Land Register data, which excludes lakes, ponds, glaciers > 1 km^{2} (0.386 sq mi or 247 acres) and river estuaries.

La Penne (French pronunciation: [la pɛn]; Occitan: La Pena; Italian: La Penna) is a commune in the Alpes-Maritimes department in southeastern France.

== Population ==
Historical population
Year	Pop.	±% p.a.
1968	124	—
1975	116	−0.95%
1982	120	+0.49%
1990	145	+2.39%
1999	164	+1.38%
2007	293	+7.52%
2012	327	+2.22%
2017	221	−7.54%
2023	254	+2.35%
Source: INSEE

== See also ==
- Communes of the Alpes-Maritimes department
