= Lieuche =

Commune in Provence-Alpes-Côte d'Azur, France

- Commune
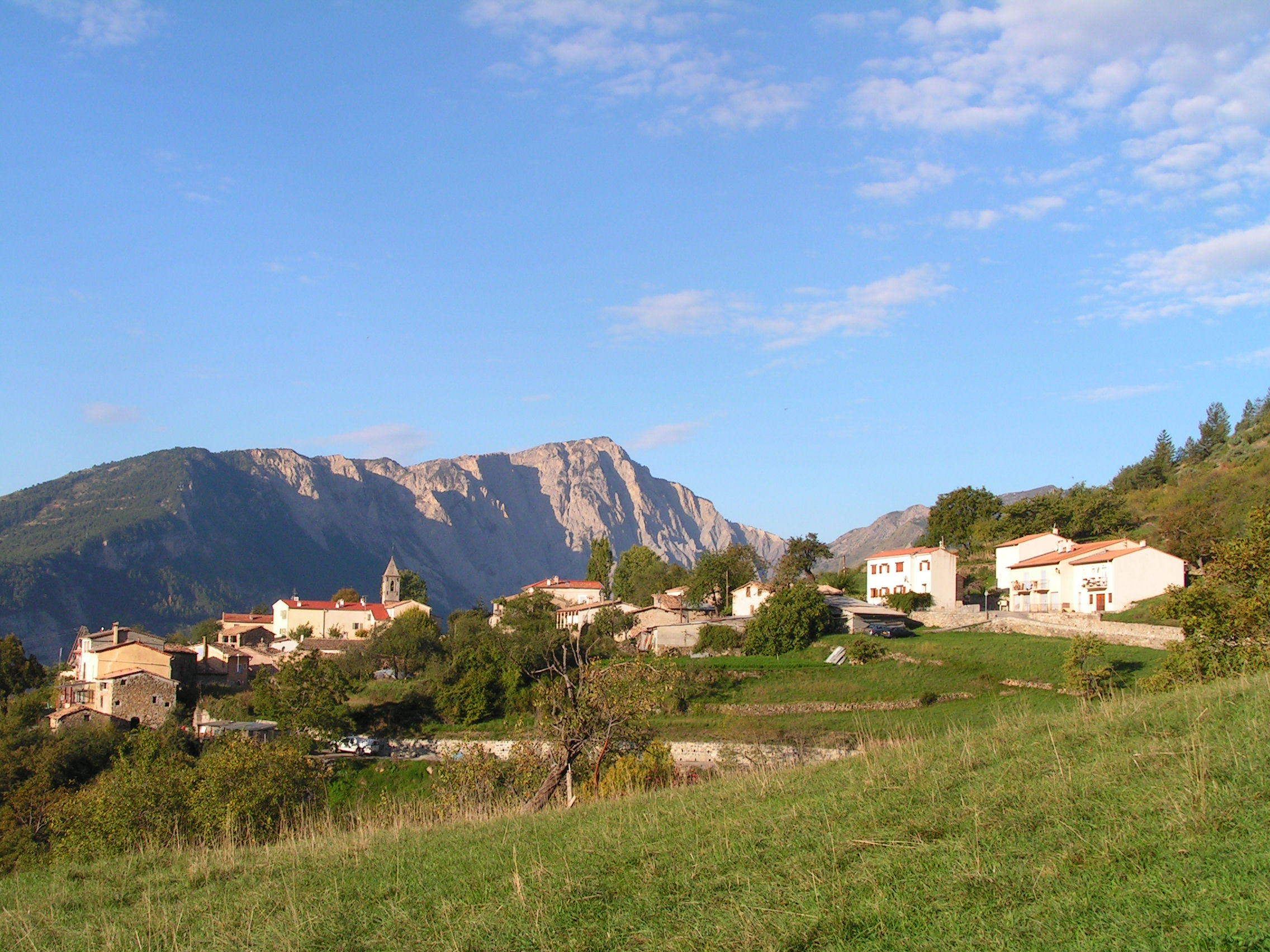
- A general view of the village of Lieuche

- Coat of arms
- Location of Lieuche
- Location within France Location within Provence-Alpes-Côte d'Azur
- Coordinates: 43°59′50″N 7°01′04″E
- Country: France
- Region: Provence-Alpes-Côte d'Azur
- Department: Alpes-Maritimes
- Arrondissement: Nice
- Canton: Vence

Government
  - Mayor (2026–32): Denise Leiboff
- Area^{1}: 13.40 km^{2} (5.17 sq mi)
- Highest elevation: 1,783 m (5,850 ft)
- Lowest elevation: 509 m (1,670 ft)
- Population (2023): 50
  - Density: 3.7/km^{2} (9.7/sq mi)
- Time zone: UTC+01:00 (CET)
  - Summer (DST): UTC+02:00 (CEST)
- INSEE/Postal code: 06076 /06260
- ^{1} French Land Register data, which excludes lakes, ponds, glaciers > 1 km^{2} (0.386 sq mi or 247 acres) and river estuaries.

Lieuche (French pronunciation: [ljœʃ]; Occitan: Lieucha; Italian: Lieucia) is a commune in the Alpes-Maritimes department in southeastern France.

== Population ==
Historical population
Year	Pop.	±% p.a.
1968	15	—
1975	17	+1.80%
1982	23	+4.41%
1990	27	+2.02%
1999	45	+5.84%
2007	44	−0.28%
2012	38	−2.89%
2017	46	+3.90%
2023	50	+1.40%
Source: INSEE

== See also ==
- Communes of the Alpes-Maritimes department
