= Valdeblore =

Commune in Provence-Alpes-Côte d'Azur, France

- Commune
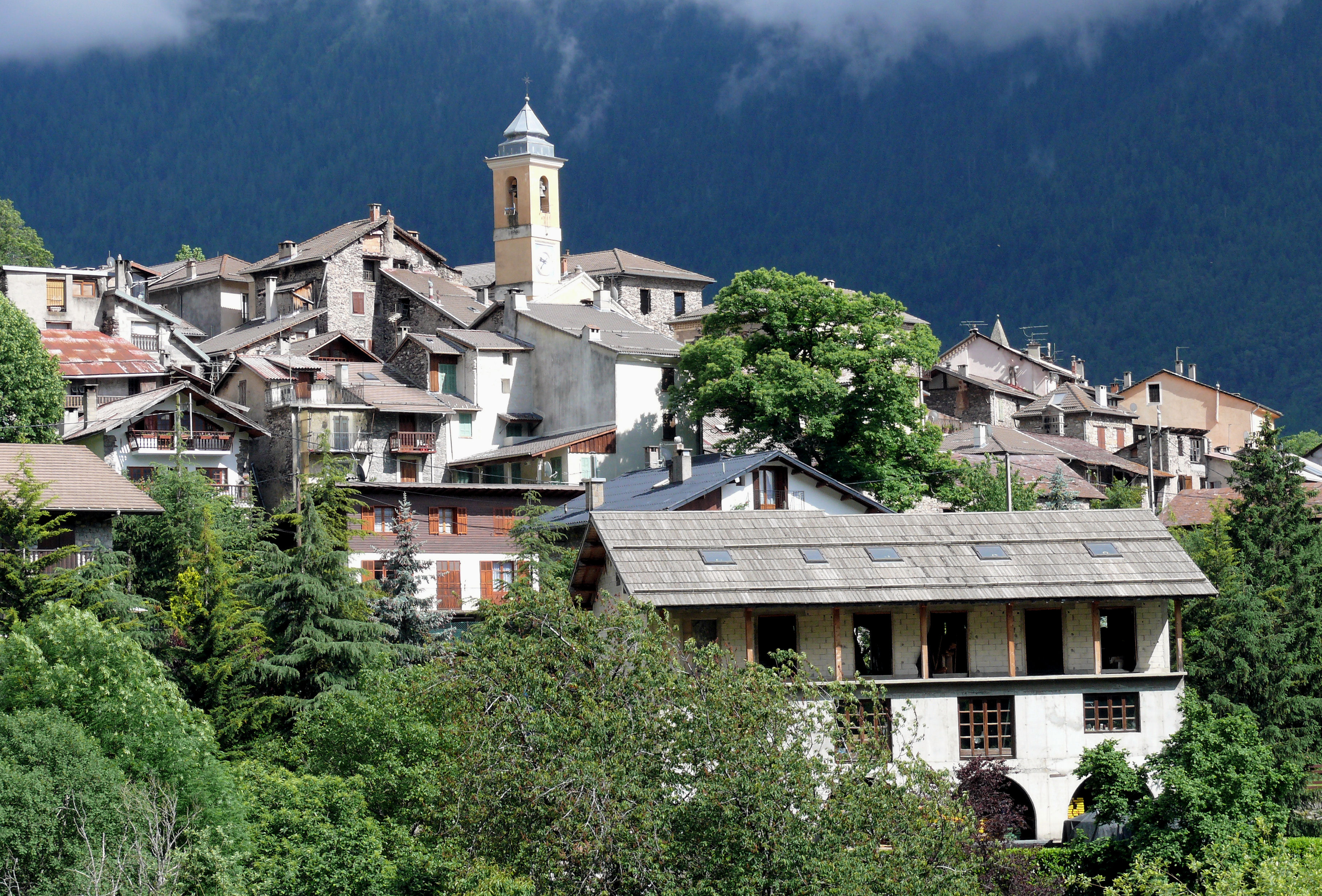
- A view of La Bolline, in Valdebore, with the bell tower of the chapel of the Pénitents Blancs

- Coat of arms
- Location of Valdeblore
- Location within France Location within Provence-Alpes-Côte d'Azur
- Coordinates: 44°04′19″N 7°10′19″E
- Country: France
- Region: Provence-Alpes-Côte d'Azur
- Department: Alpes-Maritimes
- Arrondissement: Nice
- Canton: Tourrette-Levens
- Intercommunality: Métropole Nice Côte d'Azur

Government
  - Mayor (2026–32): Danièle Giuge-Gastaldi
- Area^{1}: 94.16 km^{2} (36.36 sq mi)
- Elevation: 1,050 m (3,440 ft)
- Highest elevation: 2,880 m (9,450 ft)
- Lowest elevation: 399 m (1,309 ft)
- Population (2023): 835
  - Density: 8.87/km^{2} (23.0/sq mi)
- Time zone: UTC+01:00 (CET)
  - Summer (DST): UTC+02:00 (CEST)
- INSEE/Postal code: 06153 /06420
- ^{1} French Land Register data, which excludes lakes, ponds, glaciers > 1 km^{2} (0.386 sq mi or 247 acres) and river estuaries.

Valdeblore (French pronunciation: [valdəblɔʁ]; Vivaro-Alpine: Val de Blora; Italian: Valdiblora) is a commune in the Alpes-Maritimes department in the Provence-Alpes-Côte d'Azur region in southeastern France.

== Population ==
Historical population
Year	Pop.	±% p.a.
1968	556	—
1975	466	−2.49%
1982	584	+3.28%
1990	664	+1.62%
1999	686	+0.36%
2007	806	+2.04%
2012	908	+2.41%
2017	853	−1.24%
2023	835	−0.35%
Source: INSEE

== See also ==
- Communes of the Alpes-Maritimes department
