= Saint-Léger, Alpes-Maritimes =

Commune in Provence-Alpes-Côte d'Azur, France

Saint-Léger
- Commune
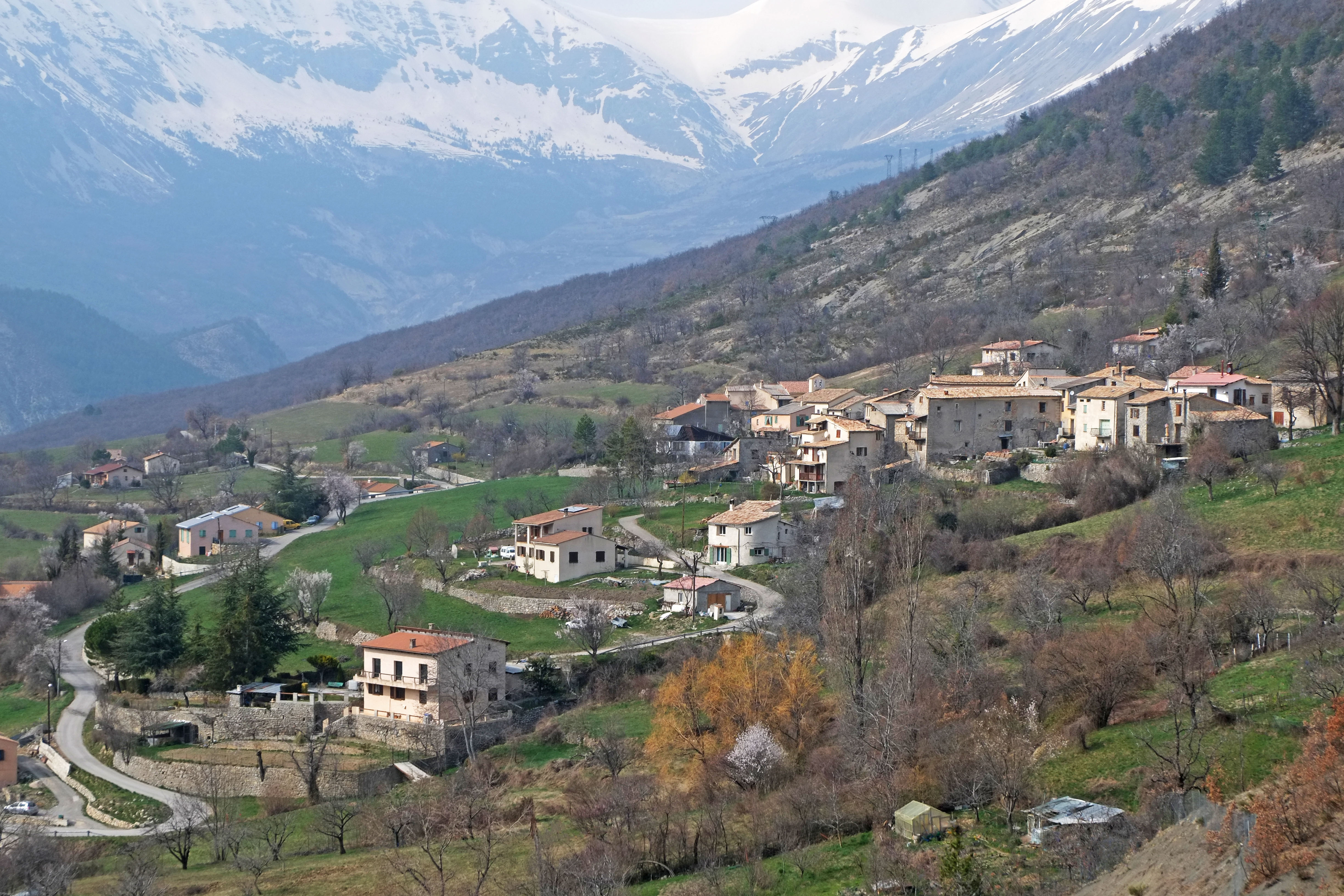
- A view of the village of Saint-Léger from the Col de Saint-Léger

- Coat of arms
- Location of Saint-Léger
- Location within France Location within Provence-Alpes-Côte d'Azur
- Coordinates: 44°00′02″N 6°49′45″E
- Country: France
- Region: Provence-Alpes-Côte d'Azur
- Department: Alpes-Maritimes
- Arrondissement: Nice
- Canton: Vence

Government
  - Mayor (2026–32): Jacques David
- Area^{1}: 4.61 km^{2} (1.78 sq mi)
- Elevation: 1,000 m (3,300 ft)
- Highest elevation: 1,600 m (5,200 ft)
- Lowest elevation: 590 m (1,940 ft)
- Population (2023): 61
  - Density: 13/km^{2} (34/sq mi)
- Time zone: UTC+01:00 (CET)
  - Summer (DST): UTC+02:00 (CEST)
- INSEE/Postal code: 06124 /06260
- ^{1} French Land Register data, which excludes lakes, ponds, glaciers > 1 km^{2} (0.386 sq mi or 247 acres) and river estuaries.

Saint-Léger (French pronunciation: [sɛ̃ leʒe]; Occitan: Sant Leugier; Italian: San Legerio) is a commune in the Alpes-Maritimes department in southeastern France.

== Population ==
Historical population
Year	Pop.	±% p.a.
1968	44	—
1975	23	−8.85%
1982	40	+8.23%
1990	54	+3.82%
1999	65	+2.08%
2007	69	+0.75%
2012	69	+0.00%
2017	51	−5.87%
2023	61	+3.03%
Source: INSEE

== See also ==
- Communes of the Alpes-Maritimes department
