= Touët-sur-Var =

Commune in Provence-Alpes-Côte d'Azur, France

Touët-sur-Var Lo Toit (Occitan)
- Commune
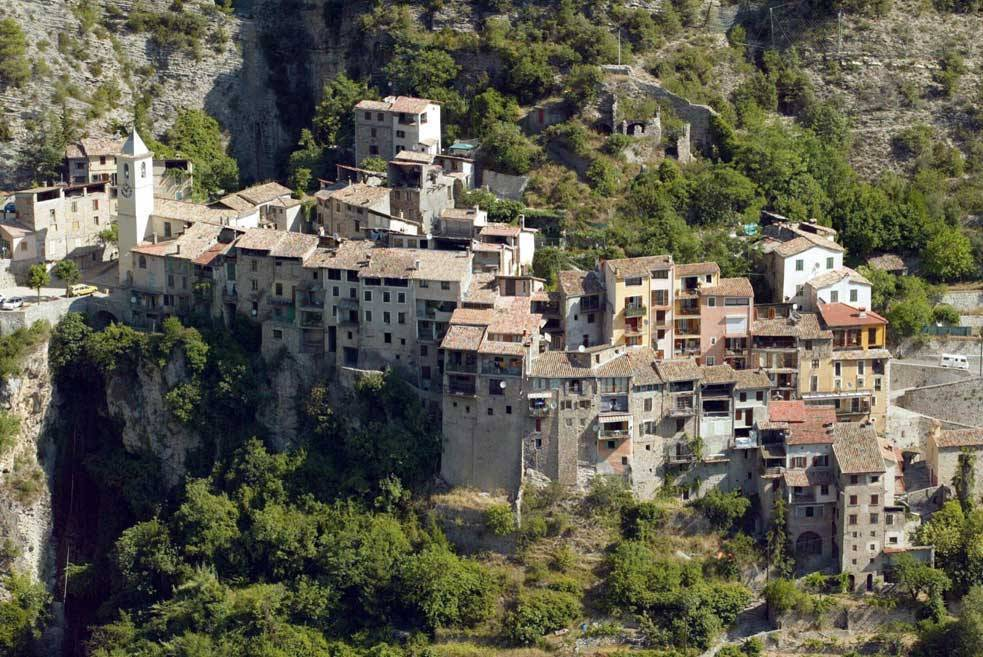
- The upper village of Touët-sur-Var

- Coat of arms
- Location of Touët-sur-Var
- Location within France Location within Provence-Alpes-Côte d'Azur
- Coordinates: 43°56′53″N 7°00′25″E
- Country: France
- Region: Provence-Alpes-Côte d'Azur
- Department: Alpes-Maritimes
- Arrondissement: Nice
- Canton: Vence

Government
  - Mayor (2026–32): Roger Ciais
- Area^{1}: 14.98 km^{2} (5.78 sq mi)
- Elevation: 350 m (1,150 ft)
- Highest elevation: 1,043 m (3,422 ft)
- Lowest elevation: 280 m (920 ft)
- Population (2023): 748
  - Density: 49.9/km^{2} (129/sq mi)
- Demonym: Touëtans
- Time zone: UTC+01:00 (CET)
  - Summer (DST): UTC+02:00 (CEST)
- INSEE/Postal code: 06143 /06710
- ^{1} French Land Register data, which excludes lakes, ponds, glaciers > 1 km^{2} (0.386 sq mi or 247 acres) and river estuaries.

Touët-sur-Var (French pronunciation: [twɛ syʁ vaʁ], lit. "Touët-on-Var"; Occitan: Lo Toit; Italian, formerly: Toetto sul Varo) is a commune in the Alpes-Maritimes department in the Provence-Alpes-Côte d'Azur region in Southeastern France.

== Geography ==
The commune, which covers a geographical area of 14.98 km^{2} (5.78 sq mi), is traversed by the rivers Var (in its centre) and the Cians (in the northeast).

== Demographics ==
Historical population
Year	Pop.	±% p.a.
1968	301	—
1975	307	+0.28%
1982	320	+0.59%
1990	342	+0.83%
1999	445	+2.97%
2007	607	+3.96%
2012	686	+2.48%
2017	672	−0.41%
2023	748	+1.80%
Source: INSEE

== See also ==
- Communes of the Alpes-Maritimes department
