= Canton of Villefranche-sur-Mer =

Coordinates: 43°42′18″N 7°18′45″E

Villefranche-sur-Mer
- Former canton
- Interactive map of Villefranche-sur-Mer
- Country: France
- Region: Provence-Alpes-Côte d'Azur
- Department: Alpes-Maritimes
- No. of communes: {{{nbcomm}}}
- Disbanded: 2015
- Area: 27.24 km^{2} (10.52 sq mi)
- Population (2012): 21,551
  - Density: 791.2/km^{2} (2,049/sq mi)

The Canton of Villefranche-sur-Mer is a French former administrative division, located in the arrondissement of Nice, in the Alpes-Maritimes département (Provence-Alpes-Côte d'Azur région). It had 21,551 inhabitants (2012). It was disbanded following the French canton reorganisation which came into effect in March 2015. The communes of the canton joined the canton of Beausoleil.

== Communes ==
The canton of Villefranche-sur-Mer comprised the following communes:

- Villefranche-sur-Mer
- Cap-d'Ail
- Beaulieu-sur-Mer
- Saint-Jean-Cap-Ferrat
- La Turbie
- Èze

== Population ==
Historical population
| Year | Pop. | ±% |
|---|---|---|
| 1968 | 20,949 | — |
| 1975 | 21,709 | +3.6% |
| 1982 | 22,314 | +2.8% |
| 1990 | 24,255 | +8.7% |
| 1999 | 22,465 | −7.4% |
| 2012 | 21,551 | −4.1% |

== See also ==
- List of cantons of France
