= Cuébris =

Commune in Provence-Alpes-Côte d'Azur, France

- Commune
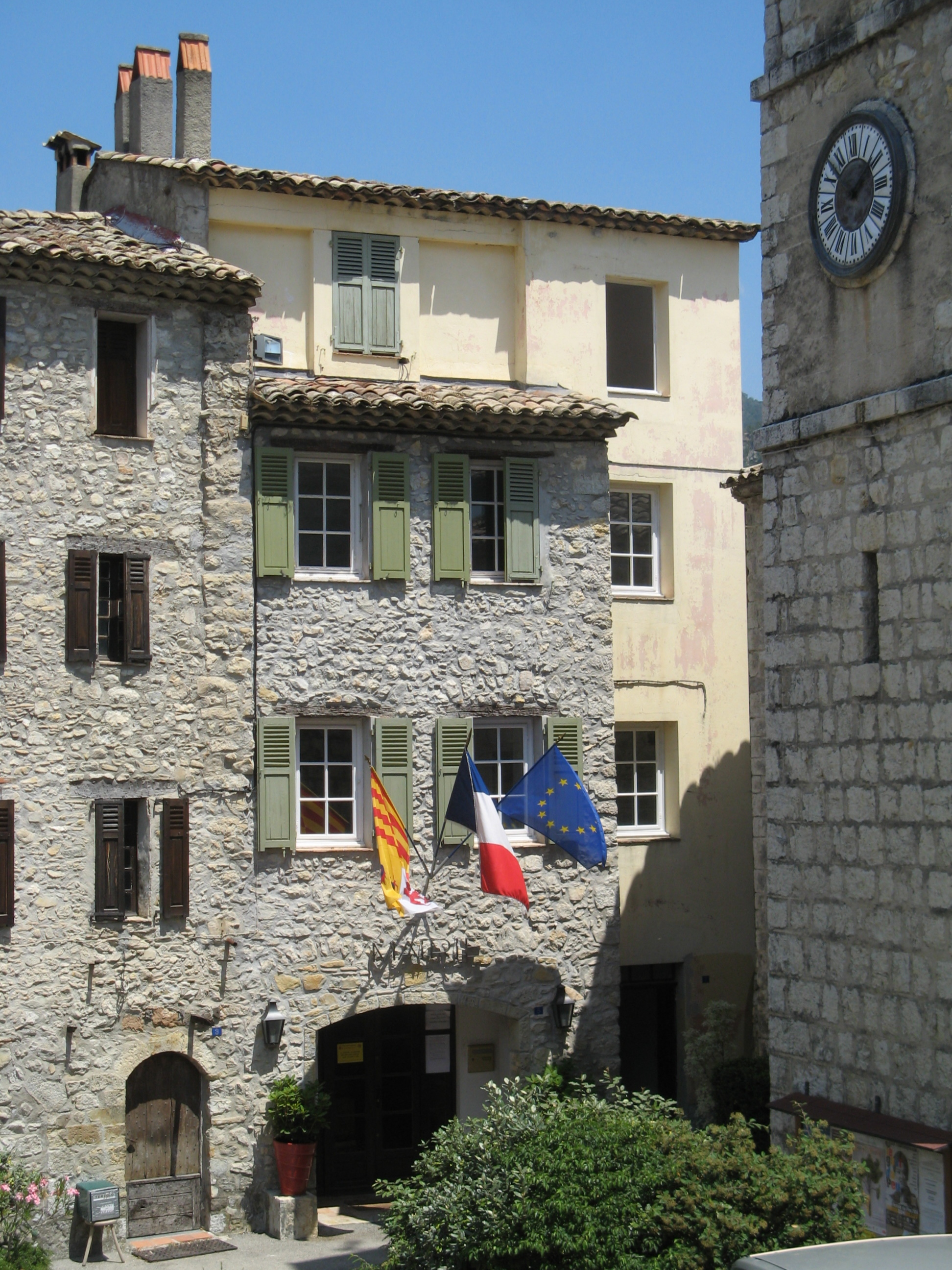
- Town hall

- Coat of arms
- Location of Cuébris
- Location within France Location within Provence-Alpes-Côte d'Azur
- Coordinates: 43°53′16″N 7°01′16″E
- Country: France
- Region: Provence-Alpes-Côte d'Azur
- Department: Alpes-Maritimes
- Arrondissement: Nice
- Canton: Vence

Government
  - Mayor (2026–32): Jean-Marc Blanc
- Area^{1}: 23.1 km^{2} (8.9 sq mi)
- Elevation: 500 m (1,600 ft)
- Highest elevation: 1,108 m (3,635 ft)
- Lowest elevation: 320 m (1,050 ft)
- Population (2023): 130
  - Density: 5.6/km^{2} (15/sq mi)
- Time zone: UTC+01:00 (CET)
  - Summer (DST): UTC+02:00 (CEST)
- INSEE/Postal code: 06052 /06910
- ^{1} French Land Register data, which excludes lakes, ponds, glaciers > 1 km^{2} (0.386 sq mi or 247 acres) and river estuaries.

Cuébris (Occitan: Cuèbri; Italian: Quebris) is a commune in the Alpes-Maritimes department in southeastern France.

== Population ==
Historical population
| Year | Pop. | ±% p.a. |
|---|---|---|
| 1968 | 63 | — |
| 1975 | 91 | +5.39% |
| 1982 | 140 | +6.35% |
| 1990 | 179 | +3.12% |
| 1999 | 180 | +0.06% |
| 2007 | 195 | +1.01% |
| 2012 | 122 | −8.95% |
| 2017 | 172 | +7.11% |
| 2023 | 130 | −4.56% |
Source: INSEE

== See also ==
- Communes of the Alpes-Maritimes department
