= Clans, Alpes-Maritimes =

Commune in Provence-Alpes-Côte d'Azur, France

Clans
- Commune
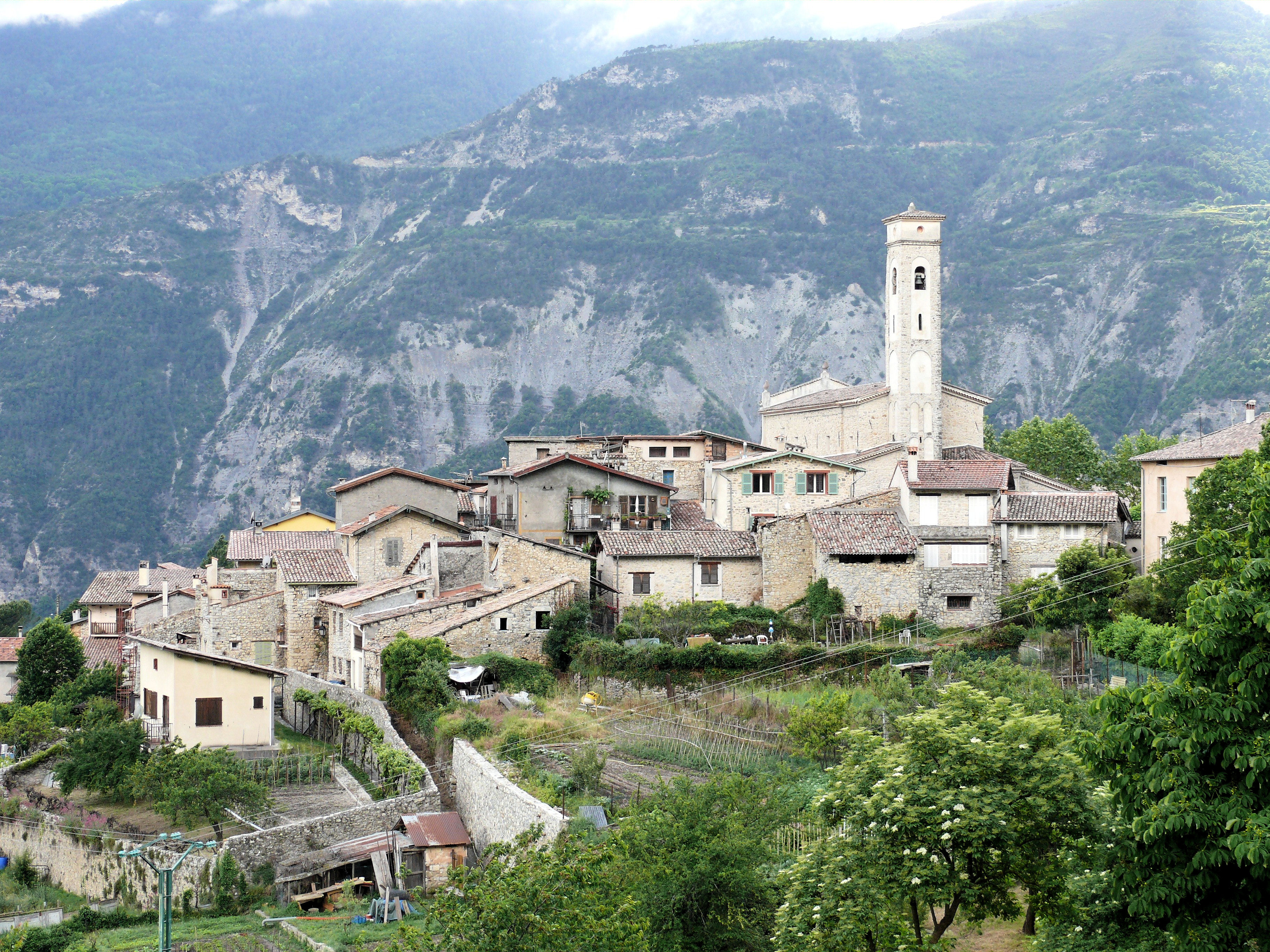
- A general view of the village

- Coat of arms
- Location of Clans
- Location within France Location within Provence-Alpes-Côte d'Azur
- Coordinates: 43°59′44″N 7°08′54″E
- Country: France
- Region: Provence-Alpes-Côte d'Azur
- Department: Alpes-Maritimes
- Arrondissement: Nice
- Canton: Tourrette-Levens
- Intercommunality: Métropole Nice Côte d'Azur

Government
  - Mayor (2026–32): Philippe Ippolito
- Area^{1}: 37.79 km^{2} (14.59 sq mi)
- Elevation: 700 m (2,300 ft)
- Highest elevation: 2,082 m (6,831 ft)
- Lowest elevation: 264 m (866 ft)
- Population (2023): 703
  - Density: 18.6/km^{2} (48.2/sq mi)
- Time zone: UTC+01:00 (CET)
  - Summer (DST): UTC+02:00 (CEST)
- INSEE/Postal code: 06042 /06420
- ^{1} French Land Register data, which excludes lakes, ponds, glaciers > 1 km^{2} (0.386 sq mi or 247 acres) and river estuaries.

Clans (French pronunciation: [klɑ̃s]; Italian: Clanzo, formerly) is a rural commune in the Métropole Nice Côte d'Azur in the Alpes-Maritimes department in the southeastern Provence-Alpes-Côte d'Azur region in France.

== Demographics ==
Historical population
| Year | Pop. | ±% p.a. |
|---|---|---|
| 1968 | 472 | — |
| 1975 | 400 | −2.34% |
| 1982 | 367 | −1.22% |
| 1990 | 496 | +3.84% |
| 1999 | 532 | +0.78% |
| 2007 | 554 | +0.51% |
| 2012 | 575 | +0.75% |
| 2017 | 638 | +2.10% |
| 2023 | 703 | +1.63% |
Source: INSEE

== See also ==
- Communes of the Alpes-Maritimes department
