= Saint-Martin-du-Var =

Commune in Provence-Alpes-Côte d'Azur, France

- Commune
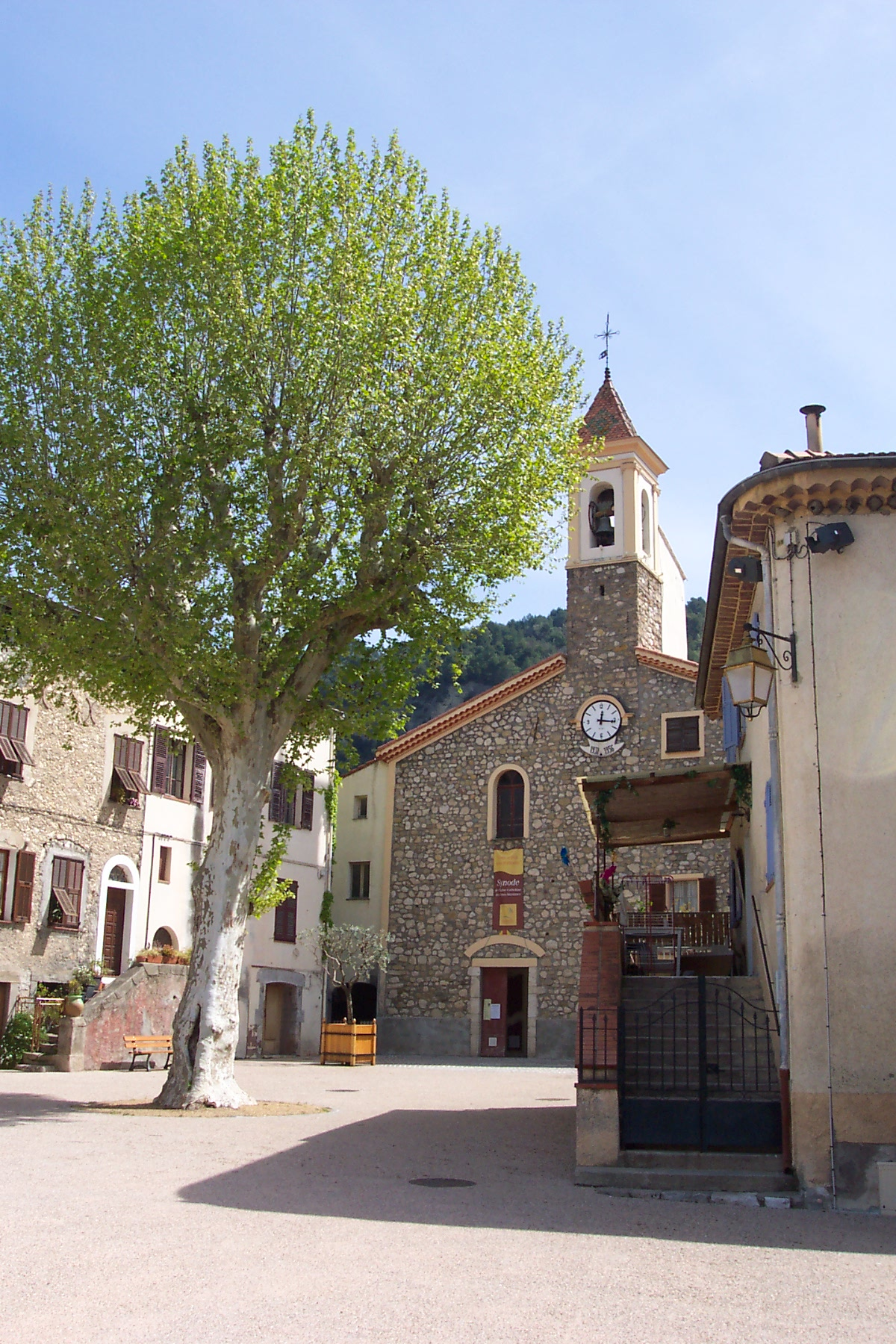
- The church and the square

- Coat of arms
- Location of Saint-Martin-du-Var
- Location within France Location within Provence-Alpes-Côte d'Azur
- Coordinates: 43°49′24″N 7°11′34″E
- Country: France
- Region: Provence-Alpes-Côte d'Azur
- Department: Alpes-Maritimes
- Arrondissement: Nice
- Canton: Tourrette-Levens
- Intercommunality: Métropole Nice Côte d'Azur

Government
  - Mayor (2026–32): Hervé Paul
- Area^{1}: 5.59 km^{2} (2.16 sq mi)
- Elevation: 115 m (377 ft)
- Highest elevation: 403 m (1,322 ft)
- Lowest elevation: 88 m (289 ft)
- Population (2023): 3,431
  - Density: 614/km^{2} (1,590/sq mi)
- Time zone: UTC+01:00 (CET)
  - Summer (DST): UTC+02:00 (CEST)
- INSEE/Postal code: 06126 /06670
- ^{1} French Land Register data, which excludes lakes, ponds, glaciers > 1 km^{2} (0.386 sq mi or 247 acres) and river estuaries.

Saint-Martin-du-Var (French pronunciation: [sɛ̃ maʁtɛ̃ dy vaʁ], literally Saint-Martin of the Var; Occitan: Sant Martin de Var; Italian: San Martino del Varo) is a commune in the Alpes-Maritimes department in southeastern France.

== Population ==
Historical population
Year	Pop.	±% p.a.
1968	1,180	—
1975	1,318	+1.59%
1982	1,528	+2.13%
1990	1,869	+2.55%
1999	2,197	+1.81%
2007	2,502	+1.64%
2012	2,682	+1.40%
2017	3,000	+2.27%
2023	3,431	+2.26%
Source: INSEE

== See also ==
- Communes of the Alpes-Maritimes department
