= Saint-Antonin, Alpes-Maritimes =

Commune in Provence-Alpes-Côte d'Azur, France

Saint-Antonin
- Commune
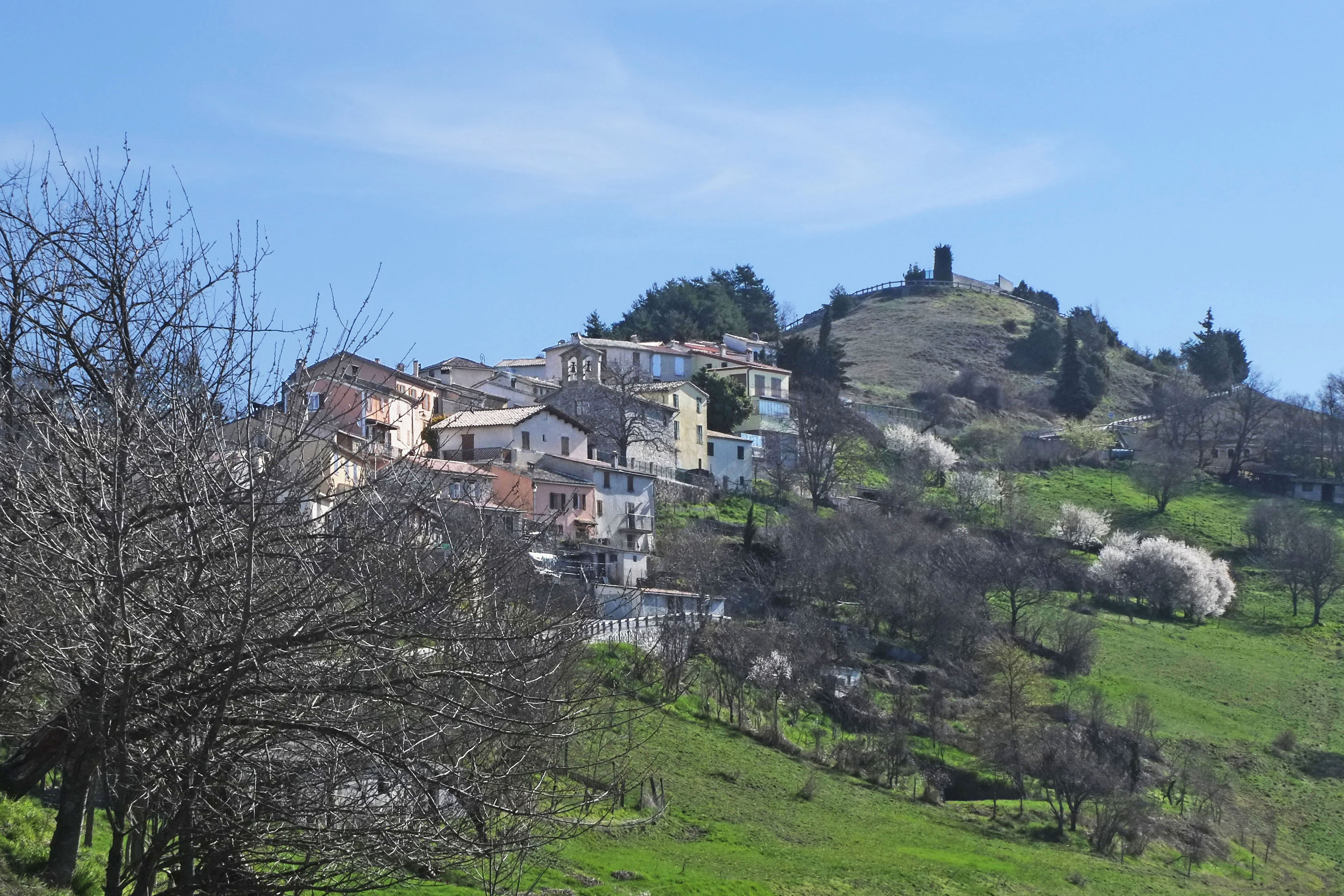
- A view of the village from the valley of La Penne

- Coat of arms
- Location of Saint-Antonin
- Location within France Location within Provence-Alpes-Côte d'Azur
- Coordinates: 43°54′41″N 6°58′51″E
- Country: France
- Region: Provence-Alpes-Côte d'Azur
- Department: Alpes-Maritimes
- Arrondissement: Nice
- Canton: Vence

Government
  - Mayor (2026–32): Céline Pignon
- Area^{1}: 6.44 km^{2} (2.49 sq mi)
- Elevation: 800 m (2,600 ft)
- Highest elevation: 901 m (2,956 ft)
- Lowest elevation: 625 m (2,051 ft)
- Population (2023): 85
  - Density: 13/km^{2} (34/sq mi)
- Time zone: UTC+01:00 (CET)
  - Summer (DST): UTC+02:00 (CEST)
- INSEE/Postal code: 06115 /06260
- ^{1} French Land Register data, which excludes lakes, ponds, glaciers > 1 km^{2} (0.386 sq mi or 247 acres) and river estuaries.

Saint-Antonin (French pronunciation: [sɛ̃.t‿ɑ̃tɔnɛ̃]; Occitan: Sant Antonin; Italian: Sant'Antonino) is a commune in the Alpes-Maritimes department in southeastern France.

== Population ==
Historical population
Year	Pop.	±% p.a.
1968	44	—
1975	43	−0.33%
1982	54	+3.31%
1990	55	+0.23%
1999	78	+3.96%
2007	103	+3.54%
2012	118	+2.76%
2017	93	−4.65%
2023	85	−1.49%
Source: INSEE

== See also ==
- Communes of the Alpes-Maritimes department
