= Malaussène =

Commune in Provence-Alpes-Côte d'Azur, France

- Commune
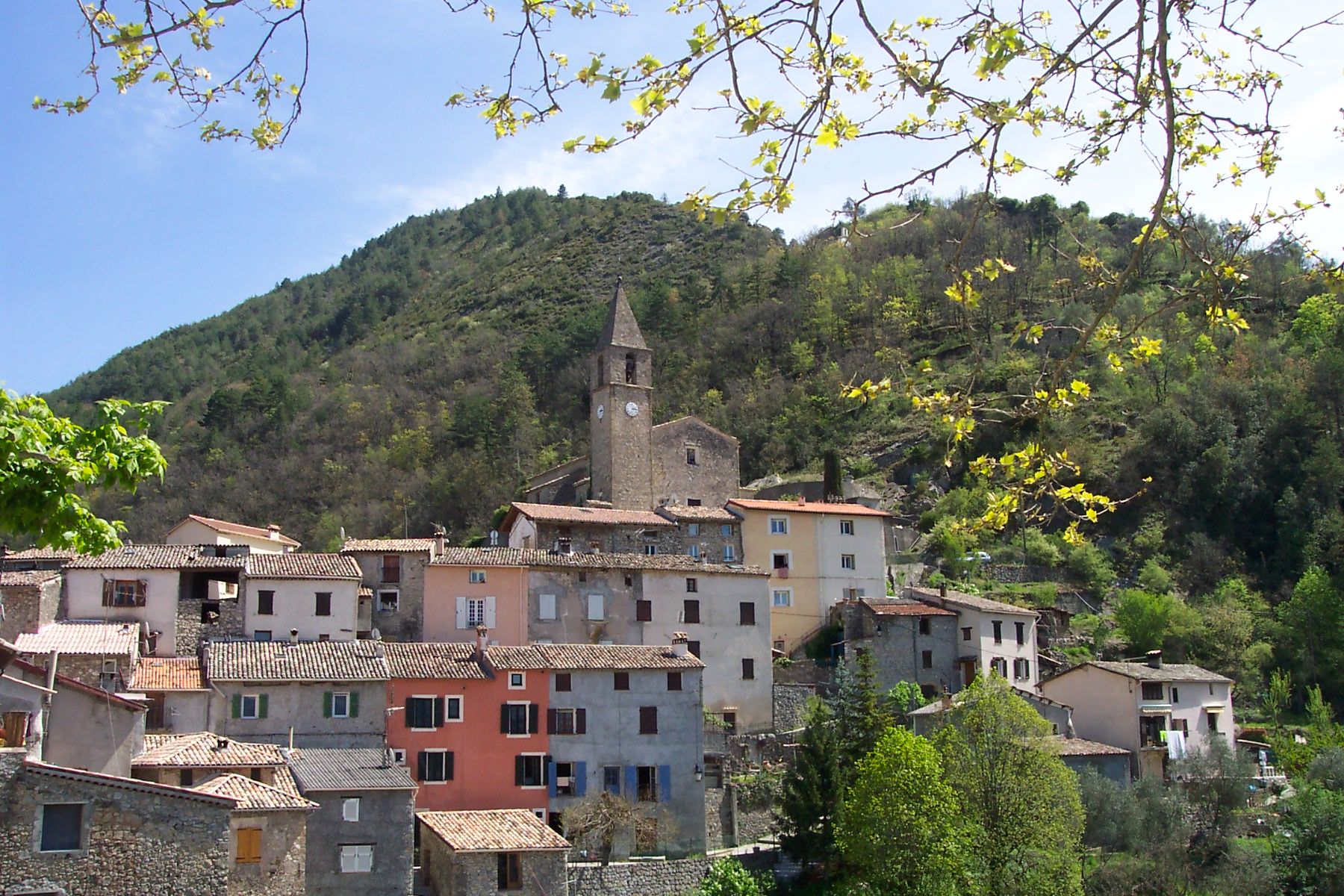
- A general view of the village

- Coat of arms
- Location of Malaussène
- Location within France Location within Provence-Alpes-Côte d'Azur
- Coordinates: 43°55′51″N 7°07′43″E
- Country: France
- Region: Provence-Alpes-Côte d'Azur
- Department: Alpes-Maritimes
- Arrondissement: Nice
- Canton: Vence

Government
  - Mayor (2026–32): Jean-Pierre Castiglia
- Area^{1}: 19.48 km^{2} (7.52 sq mi)
- Elevation: 410 m (1,350 ft)
- Highest elevation: 1,468 m (4,816 ft)
- Lowest elevation: 154 m (505 ft)
- Population (2023): 326
  - Density: 16.7/km^{2} (43.3/sq mi)
- Time zone: UTC+01:00 (CET)
  - Summer (DST): UTC+02:00 (CEST)
- INSEE/Postal code: 06078 /06710
- ^{1} French Land Register data, which excludes lakes, ponds, glaciers > 1 km^{2} (0.386 sq mi or 247 acres) and river estuaries.

Malaussène (French pronunciation: [malosɛn]; Occitan: Malaussèna; Italian: Malaussena) is a commune in the Alpes-Maritimes department in southeastern France.

== Population ==
Historical population
Year	Pop.	±% p.a.
1968	114	—
1975	72	−6.35%
1982	72	+0.00%
1990	129	+7.56%
1999	173	+3.31%
2007	221	+3.11%
2012	265	+3.70%
2017	311	+3.25%
2023	326	+0.79%
Source: INSEE

== See also ==
- Communes of the Alpes-Maritimes department
