= Bonson, Alpes-Maritimes =

Commune in Provence-Alpes-Côte d'Azur, France

Bonson
- Commune
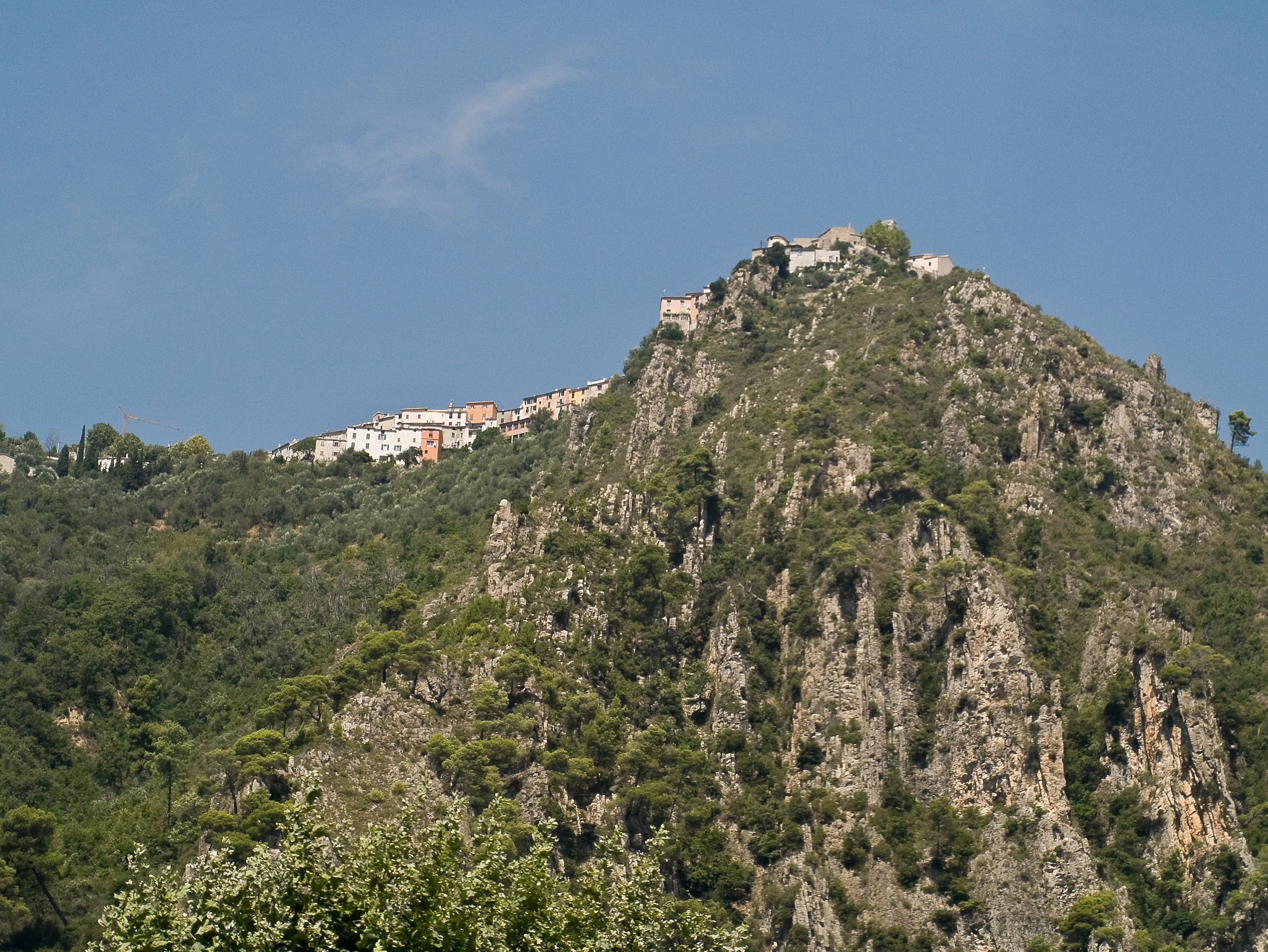
- The village of Bonson, perched on the hillside and seen from the Var valley

- Coat of arms
- Location of Bonson
- Location within France Location within Provence-Alpes-Côte d'Azur
- Coordinates: 43°51′49″N 7°11′26″E
- Country: France
- Region: Provence-Alpes-Côte d'Azur
- Department: Alpes-Maritimes
- Arrondissement: Nice
- Canton: Vence
- Intercommunality: Métropole Nice Côte d'Azur

Government
  - Mayor (2026–32): Jean-Claude Martin
- Area^{1}: 6.72 km^{2} (2.59 sq mi)
- Elevation: 400 m (1,300 ft)
- Highest elevation: 841 m (2,759 ft)
- Lowest elevation: 119 m (390 ft)
- Population (2023): 740
  - Density: 110/km^{2} (290/sq mi)
- Demonym: Bonsonnois
- Time zone: UTC+01:00 (CET)
  - Summer (DST): UTC+02:00 (CEST)
- INSEE/Postal code: 06021 /06830
- ^{1} French Land Register data, which excludes lakes, ponds, glaciers > 1 km^{2} (0.386 sq mi or 247 acres) and river estuaries.

Bonson (French pronunciation: [bɔ̃sɔ̃]; Italian: Bonsone) is a commune in the Alpes-Maritimes department in southeastern France.

== Population ==
Historical population
Year	Pop.	±% p.a.
1968	232	—
1975	235	+0.18%
1982	288	+2.95%
1990	456	+5.91%
1999	601	+3.12%
2007	668	+1.33%
2012	706	+1.11%
2017	737	+0.86%
2023	740	+0.07%
Source: INSEE

== See also ==
- Communes of the Alpes-Maritimes department
