= Châteauneuf-d'Entraunes =

Commune in Provence-Alpes-Côte d'Azur, France

- Commune
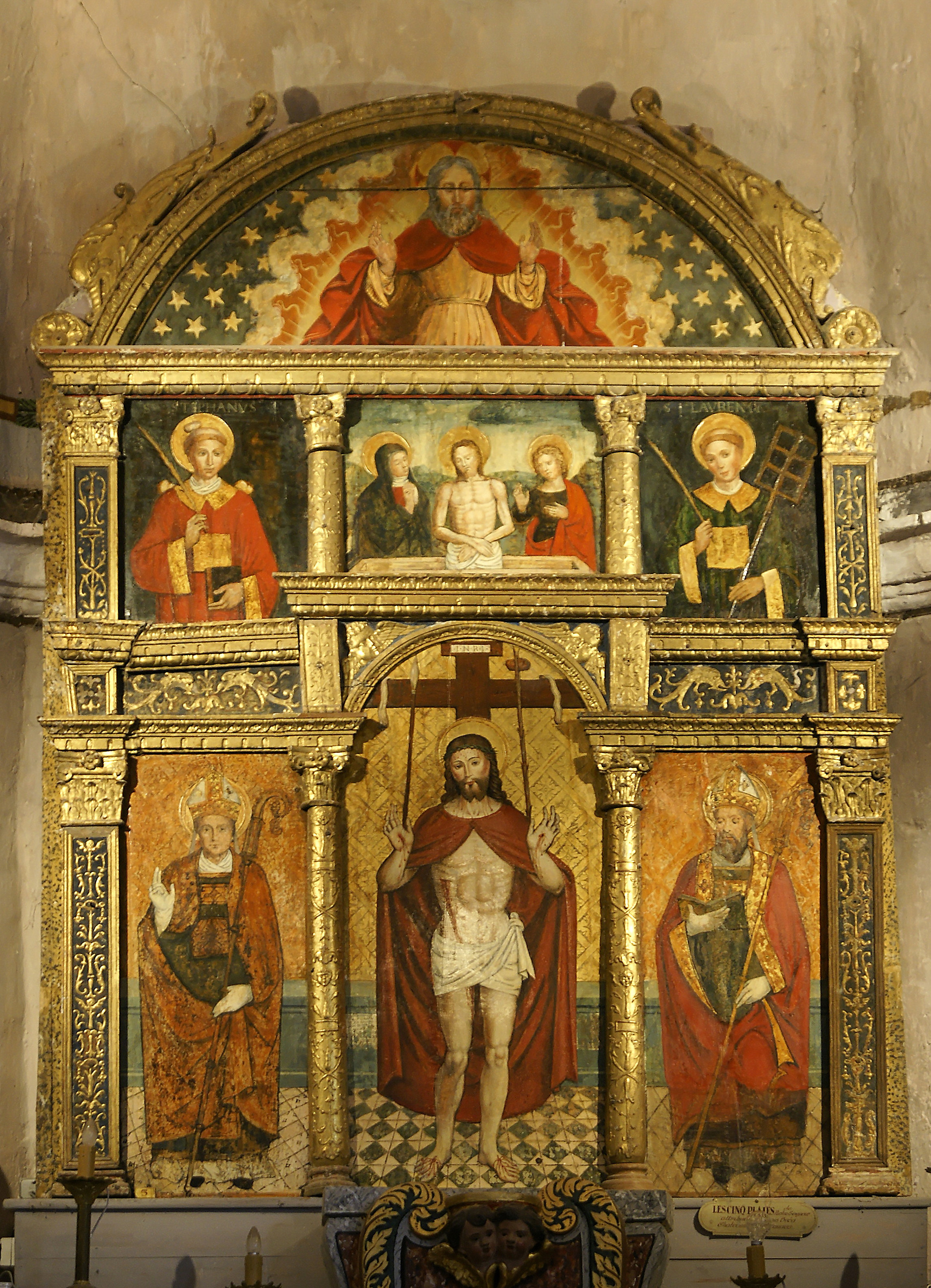
- Altarpiece

- Coat of arms
- Location of Châteauneuf-d'Entraunes
- Location within France Location within Provence-Alpes-Côte d'Azur
- Coordinates: 44°07′45″N 6°49′58″E
- Country: France
- Region: Provence-Alpes-Côte d'Azur
- Department: Alpes-Maritimes
- Arrondissement: Nice
- Canton: Vence

Government
  - Mayor (2026–32): Jocelyne Baruffa
- Area^{1}: 29.91 km^{2} (11.55 sq mi)
- Elevation: 1,282 m (4,206 ft)
- Highest elevation: 2,813 m (9,229 ft)
- Lowest elevation: 880 m (2,890 ft)
- Population (2023): 62
  - Density: 2.1/km^{2} (5.4/sq mi)
- Time zone: UTC+01:00 (CET)
  - Summer (DST): UTC+02:00 (CEST)
- INSEE/Postal code: 06040 /06470
- ^{1} French Land Register data, which excludes lakes, ponds, glaciers > 1 km^{2} (0.386 sq mi or 247 acres) and river estuaries.

Châteauneuf-d'Entraunes (French: [ʃɑtonœf dɑ̃tʁon]; Occitan: Chasternòu d'Entraunas; Italian: Castelnuovo d'Entraunes) is a commune in the Alpes-Maritimes department in southeastern France. It is situated in the Val d'Entraunes, the upper valley of the river Var. It lies partly within the Mercantour National Park. The church of Saint-Nicolas houses a 16th-century altarpiece, attributed to François Bréa.

== Population ==
Historical population
Year	Pop.	±% p.a.
1968	19	—
1975	36	+9.56%
1982	47	+3.88%
1990	71	+5.29%
1999	56	−2.60%
2007	66	+2.08%
2012	52	−4.66%
2017	58	+2.21%
2023	62	+1.12%
Source: INSEE

== See also ==
- Communes of the Alpes-Maritimes department
