= Marie, Alpes-Maritimes =

Commune in Provence-Alpes-Côte d'Azur, France

Marie
- Commune
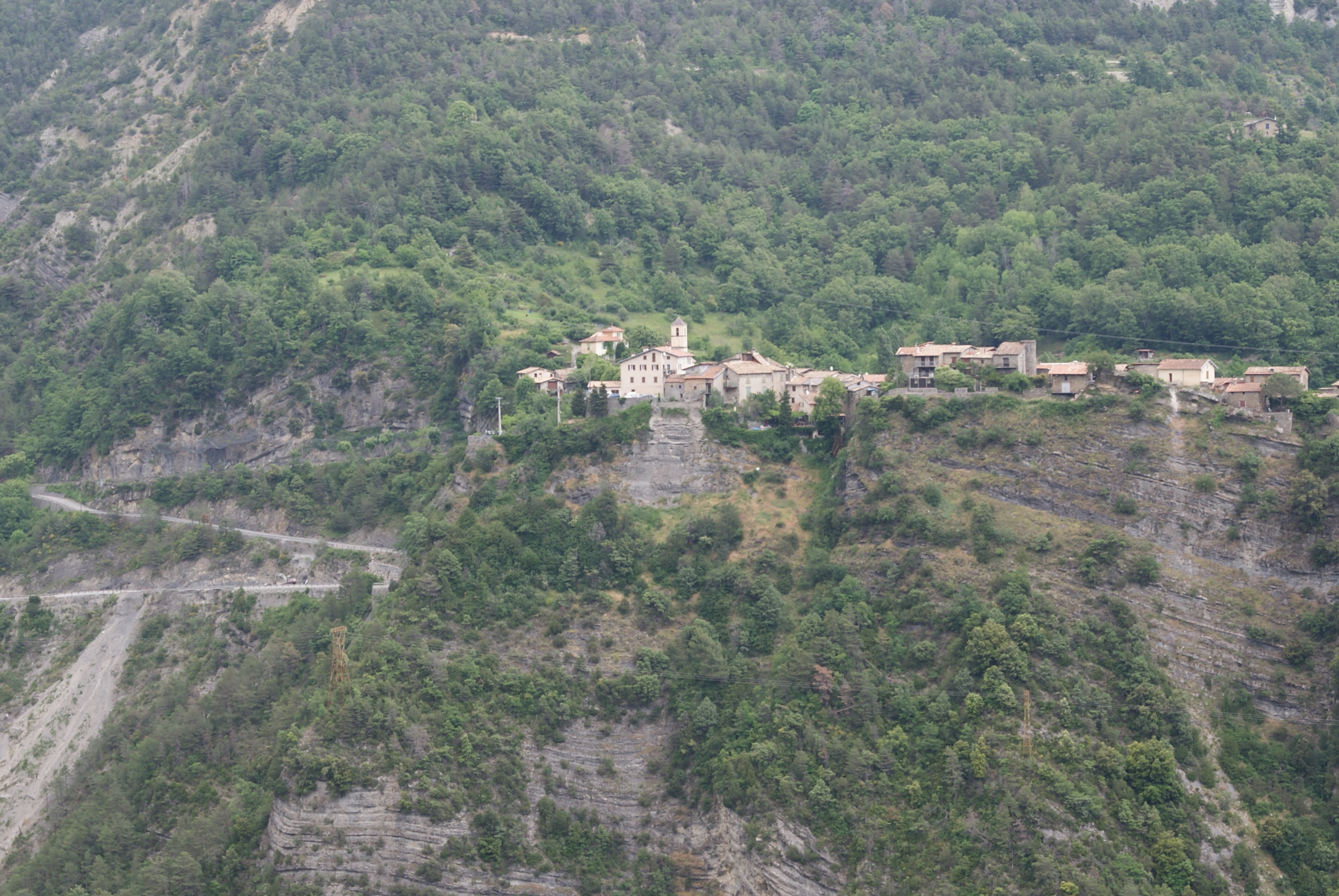
- A distant view of the village of Marie

- Coat of arms
- Location of Marie
- Location within France Location within Provence-Alpes-Côte d'Azur
- Coordinates: 44°01′59″N 7°08′07″E
- Country: France
- Region: Provence-Alpes-Côte d'Azur
- Department: Alpes-Maritimes
- Arrondissement: Nice
- Canton: Tourrette-Levens
- Intercommunality: Métropole Nice Côte d'Azur

Government
  - Mayor (2026–32): Gérard Steppel
- Area^{1}: 14.77 km^{2} (5.70 sq mi)
- Elevation: 628 m (2,060 ft)
- Highest elevation: 2,089 m (6,854 ft)
- Lowest elevation: 341 m (1,119 ft)
- Population (2023): 109
  - Density: 7.38/km^{2} (19.1/sq mi)
- Demonym: Mariols
- Time zone: UTC+01:00 (CET)
  - Summer (DST): UTC+02:00 (CEST)
- INSEE/Postal code: 06080 /06420
- ^{1} French Land Register data, which excludes lakes, ponds, glaciers > 1 km^{2} (0.386 sq mi or 247 acres) and river estuaries.

Marie (French pronunciation: [maʁi]; Occitan and Italian: Maria) is a commune in the Alpes-Maritimes department in southeastern France.

== Population ==
Historical population
Year	Pop.	±% p.a.
1968	50	—
1975	44	−1.81%
1982	50	+1.84%
1990	64	+3.13%
1999	50	−2.71%
2007	83	+6.54%
2012	91	+1.86%
2017	105	+2.90%
2023	109	+0.63%
Source: INSEE

== See also ==
- Communes of the Alpes-Maritimes department
