= Venanson =

Commune in Provence-Alpes-Côte d'Azur, France

Venanson Venaçon (Occitan)
- Commune
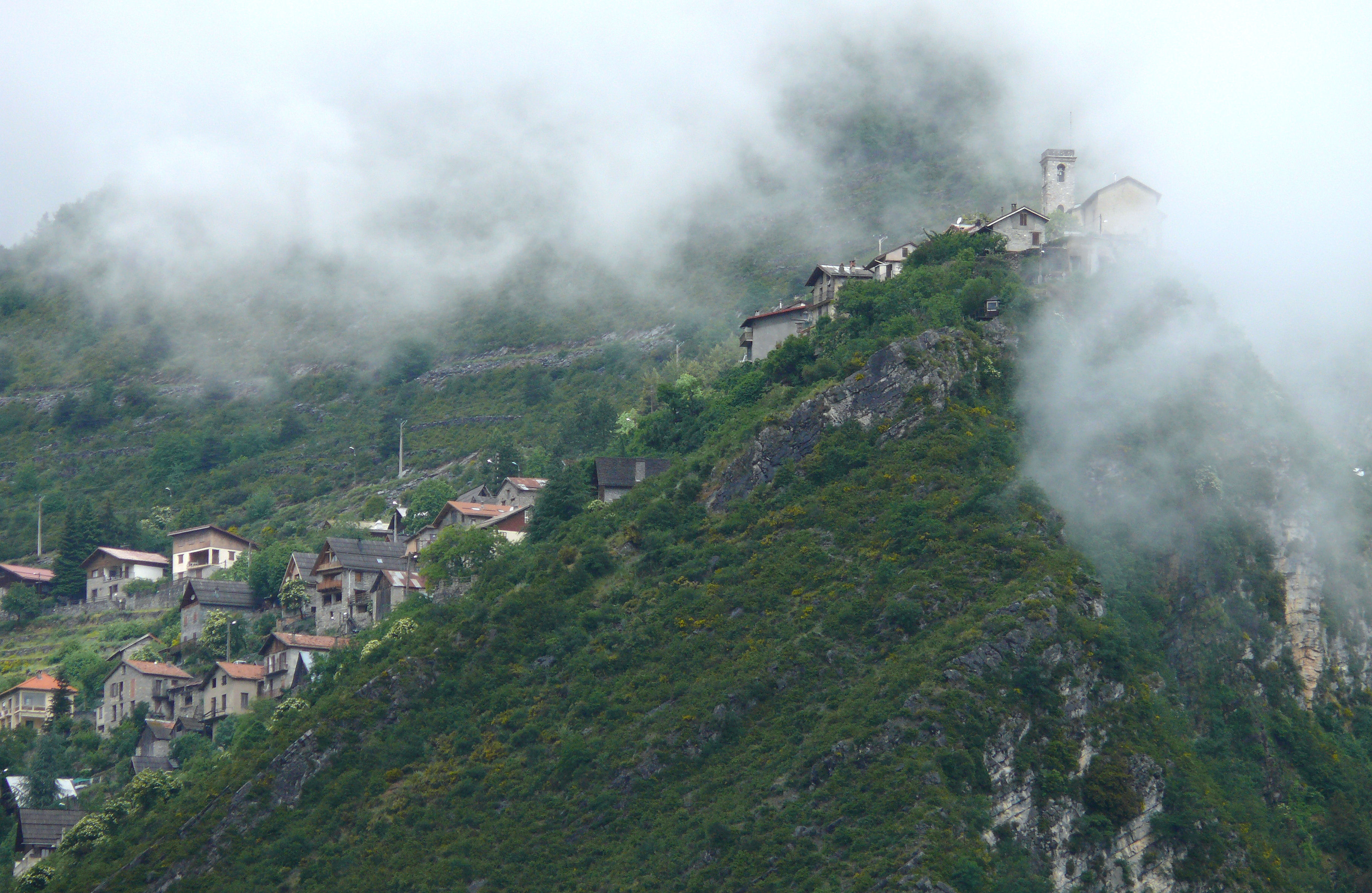
- Venanson, on the hillside, among the clouds

- Coat of arms
- Location of Venanson
- Location within France Location within Provence-Alpes-Côte d'Azur
- Coordinates: 44°03′14″N 7°15′14″E
- Country: France
- Region: Provence-Alpes-Côte d'Azur
- Department: Alpes-Maritimes
- Arrondissement: Nice
- Canton: Tourrette-Levens
- Intercommunality: Métropole Nice Côte d'Azur

Government
  - Mayor (2026–32): Loetitia Loré
- Area^{1}: 17.98 km^{2} (6.94 sq mi)
- Elevation: 1,164 m (3,819 ft)
- Highest elevation: 2,089 m (6,854 ft)
- Lowest elevation: 760 m (2,490 ft)
- Population (2023): 195
  - Density: 10.8/km^{2} (28.1/sq mi)
- Time zone: UTC+01:00 (CET)
  - Summer (DST): UTC+02:00 (CEST)
- INSEE/Postal code: 06156 /06450
- ^{1} French Land Register data, which excludes lakes, ponds, glaciers > 1 km^{2} (0.386 sq mi or 247 acres) and river estuaries.

Venanson (French pronunciation: [vənɑ̃sɔ̃]; Occitan: Venaçon; Italian: Venanzone, formerly) is a rural commune in the Alpes-Maritimes department in the Provence-Alpes-Côte d'Azur region in Southeastern France.

== Demographics ==
Historical population
Year	Pop.	±% p.a.
1968	103	—
1975	84	−2.87%
1982	106	+3.38%
1990	95	−1.36%
1999	123	+2.91%
2007	140	+1.63%
2012	152	+1.66%
2017	159	+0.90%
2023	195	+3.46%
Source: INSEE

== See also ==
- Communes of the Alpes-Maritimes department
