= La Bollène-Vésubie =

Commune in Provence-Alpes-Côte d'Azur, France

- Commune
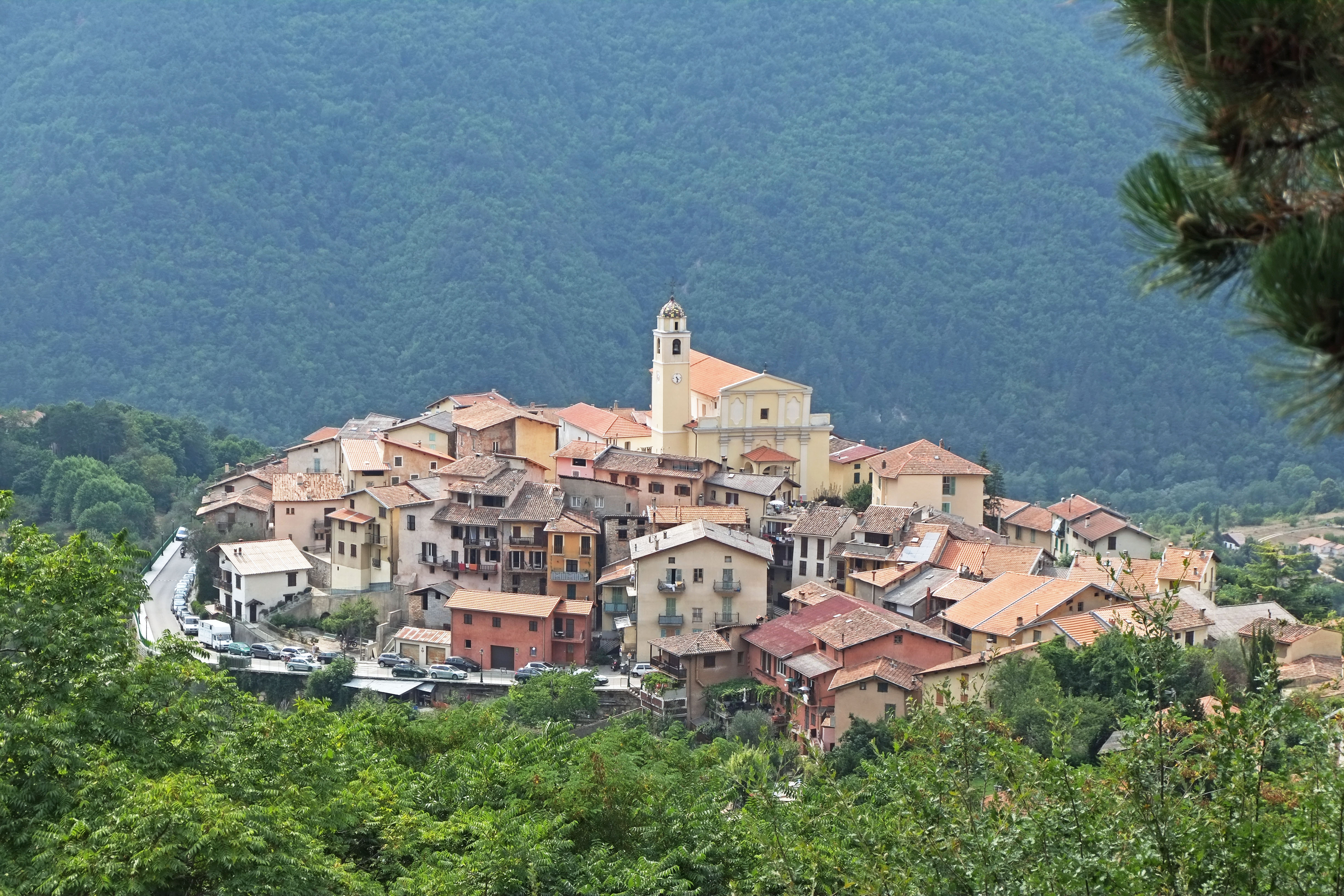
- The village of La Bollène Vésubie seen from the north side of the Col de Turini

- Coat of arms
- Location of La Bollène-Vésubie
- Location within France Location within Provence-Alpes-Côte d'Azur
- Coordinates: 43°59′26″N 7°19′54″E
- Country: France
- Region: Provence-Alpes-Côte d'Azur
- Department: Alpes-Maritimes
- Arrondissement: Nice
- Canton: Tourrette-Levens
- Intercommunality: Métropole Nice Côte d'Azur

Government
  - Mayor (2026–32): Martine Barengo-Ferrier
- Area^{1}: 35.57 km^{2} (13.73 sq mi)
- Elevation: 650 m (2,130 ft)
- Highest elevation: 2,122 m (6,962 ft)
- Lowest elevation: 465 m (1,526 ft)
- Population (2023): 662
  - Density: 18.6/km^{2} (48.2/sq mi)
- Time zone: UTC+01:00 (CET)
  - Summer (DST): UTC+02:00 (CEST)
- INSEE/Postal code: 06020 /06450
- ^{1} French Land Register data, which excludes lakes, ponds, glaciers > 1 km^{2} (0.386 sq mi or 247 acres) and river estuaries.

La Bollène-Vésubie (French pronunciation: [la bɔlɛn vezybi]; Occitan: La Bolena; Italian: Bolena) is a commune in the Alpes-Maritimes department in the Provence-Alpes-Cote-d'Azur region in southeastern France.

Its inhabitants are called Bollénois; in the Niçois dialect of Langue d'Oc the name is la Boulèna, the inhabitants lu Boulenasc.

== Population ==
Historical population
Year	Pop.	±% p.a.
1968	243	—
1975	247	+0.23%
1982	262	+0.85%
1990	308	+2.04%
1999	413	+3.31%
2007	562	+3.93%
2012	552	−0.36%
2017	575	+0.82%
2023	662	+2.38%
Source: INSEE

== See also ==
- Communes of the Alpes-Maritimes department
