= Andon, Alpes-Maritimes =

Commune in Provence-Alpes-Côte d'Azur, France

Andon Andon e Torenc (Occitan) Andone (Italian)
- Commune
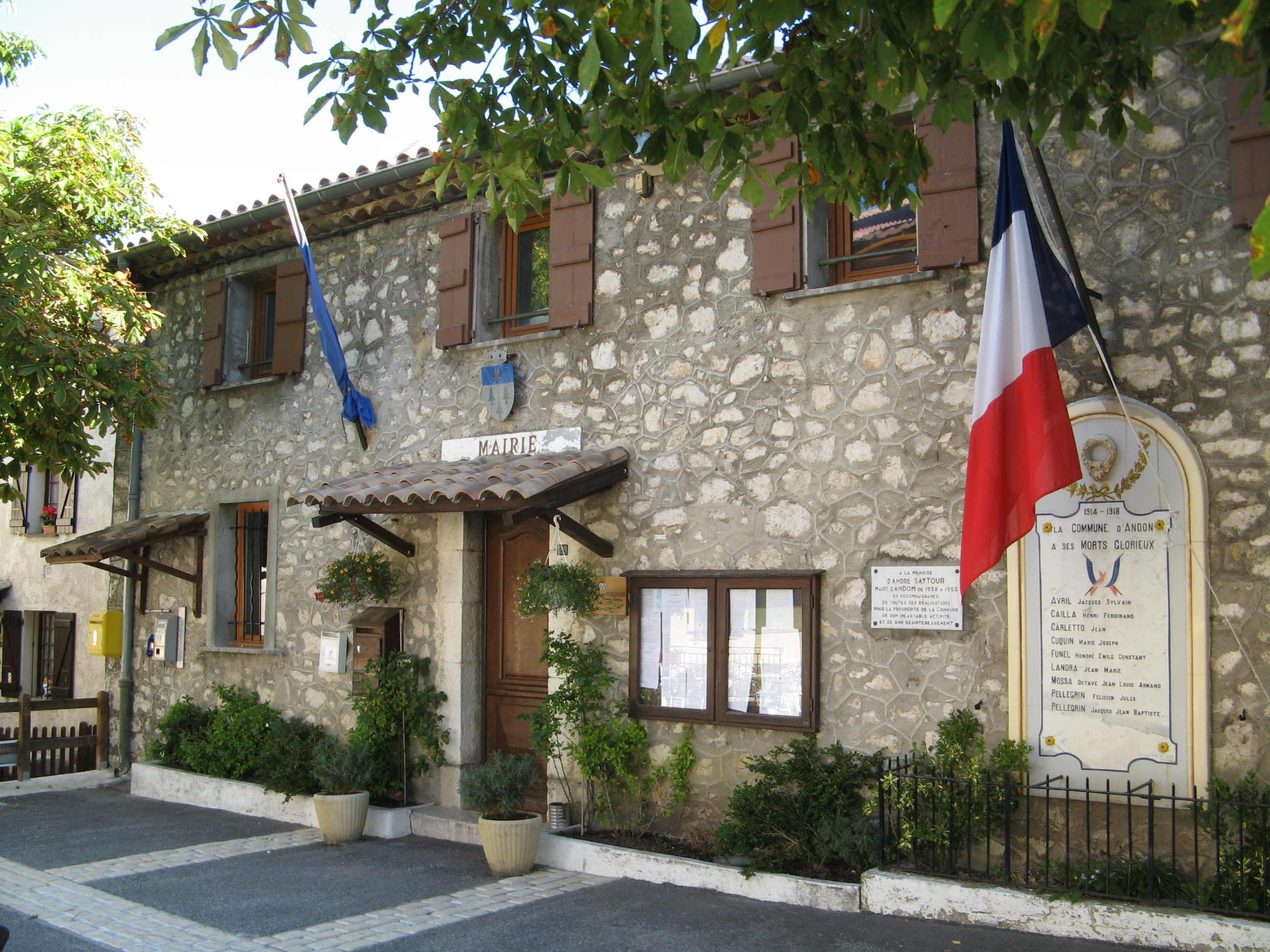
- Town hall

- Coat of arms
- Location of Andon
- Location within France Location within Provence-Alpes-Côte d'Azur
- Coordinates: 43°46′27″N 6°47′14″E
- Country: France
- Region: Provence-Alpes-Côte d'Azur
- Department: Alpes-Maritimes
- Arrondissement: Grasse
- Canton: Grasse-1
- Intercommunality: Pays de Grasse

Government
  - Mayor (2026–32): David Varrone
- Area^{1}: 54.3 km^{2} (21.0 sq mi)
- Elevation: 1,200 m (3,900 ft)
- Highest elevation: 1,649 m (5,410 ft)
- Lowest elevation: 911 m (2,989 ft)
- Population (2023): 665
  - Density: 12.2/km^{2} (31.7/sq mi)
- Demonym: Andonnais-Thorencois
- Time zone: UTC+01:00 (CET)
  - Summer (DST): UTC+02:00 (CEST)
- INSEE/Postal code: 06003 /06750
- ^{1} French Land Register data, which excludes lakes, ponds, glaciers > 1 km^{2} (0.386 sq mi or 247 acres) and river estuaries.

Andon (French pronunciation: [ɑ̃dɔ̃]; Occitan: Andon e Torenc; Italian: Andone) is a commune in the Alpes-Maritimes department in the Provence-Alpes-Côte d'Azur region of southeastern France.

== Geography ==
Andon is a small village in the Alpes-Maritimes located about 50 kilometres north-west of Cannes and 30 kilometres south-east of Castellane. Andon is a second home for many coastal residents and for people attracted by the peace and beauty of the area and a winter village surrounded by small ski resorts.

Due to its proximity to the Côte d'Azur and the quietness of the mountains, Andon is a hub for tourists, regular or not, each in search of calm for a few days or hours and is also a haven of peace for artists.

The ski resort of Audibergue is in Andon commune. The Loup has its source nearby.

The village is accessible via the D79 which branches west from the D5 road passing through the village and continuing west to Caille. The D2 road also passes through the north of the commune from Valderoure in the west to Greolieres in the east. The No. 400 route of the Sillages Transport Association (Valderoure-Saint-Vallier) serves the town from Monday to Friday on request and No. 410 route (Valderoure-Villaute) and No. 411 route (Saint-Auban-Villaute) from Monday to Saturday also on request.

=== Climate ===
The climate of the region is Alpine with Mediterranean influences. Winters are cold (−4 °C to 6 °C) with warm summers (22 °C in the afternoon) and sunny with cool nights (8 to 10 °C). The rest of the year is rather cool with frosts possible from October to May.

Climate data for Andon-Thorenc (1899-1908; 1932-1941; 1943-1950 except 1945-1947)
Month	Jan	Feb	Mar	Apr	May	Jun	Jul	Aug	Sep	Oct	Nov	Dec	Year
Mean daily maximum °C (°F)	5.5 (41.9)	5.5 (41.9)	9.0 (48.2)	12.4 (54.3)	15.5 (59.9)	19.6 (67.3)	22.3 (72.1)	22.1 (71.8)	19.2 (66.6)	14.1 (57.4)	9.5 (49.1)	5.5 (41.9)	13.4 (56.1)
Mean daily minimum °C (°F)	−3.0 (26.6)	−3.4 (25.9)	−1.4 (29.5)	1.7 (35.1)	4.2 (39.6)	7.9 (46.2)	10.3 (50.5)	10.3 (50.5)	8.0 (46.4)	4.3 (39.7)	−0.1 (31.8)	−2.4 (27.7)	3.0 (37.4)
Average rainfall mm (inches)	82 (3.2)	82 (3.2)	117 (4.6)	91 (3.6)	104 (4.1)	72 (2.8)	60 (2.4)	30 (1.2)	106 (4.2)	167 (6.6)	137 (5.4)	78 (3.1)	1,126 (44.3)
Average rainy days (≥ 1 mm)	4	5	6	7	9	7	5	4	5	9	8	6	75
Mean monthly sunshine hours	182.9	186.5	221.7	246.0	190.7	285.0	339.5	244.9	258.0	223.2	171.0	127.1	2,676.5
Source: Les Alpes-Maritimes, Etages Climatiques et Indications Médicales - Dr. Jean Ducoeur

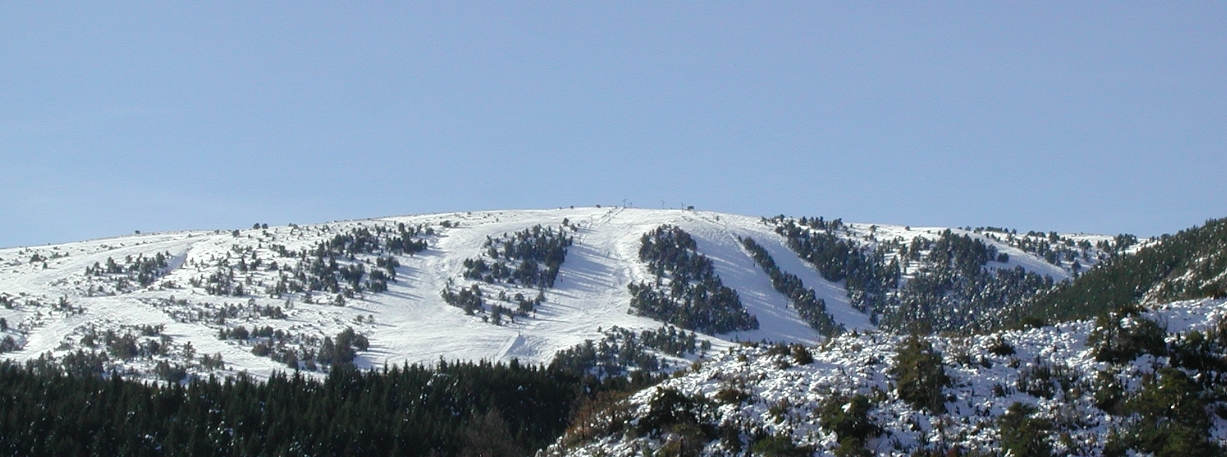
Panoramic View of Audiberge in winter

== History ==
The commune of Andon incorporates territory from three areas with Thorenc and Haut-Thorenc, Thorenc-Station, and Bas-Thorenc in the north, the hamlet of Canauxin in the east, and the ski resort of Audibergue in the south.

=== Andon ===
The site of Andon village has been occupied since 1000 BC. There are traces of the presence of Ligures in an entrenched camp called Castellaras de la Selle d'Andon. This site was later occupied by the Romans. Milestones have been found indicating the Via Vintiana connecting Séranon to Gréolières with the names of the Emperor Marcus Aurelius and the procurator Julius Honoratus.

There are traces of Roman presence at multiple sites in the commune at: la Selle de Caille, la ferme du château, la Moulière, les Teilles, la Selle d'Andon, la Baisse, la Haute-Valette. At Collet de la Serre in the castellaras a small necropolis was found. The ruins of a large Roman tomb have been identified near the priory of Clos de Bourges.

The village of Andon succeeded a former village which was perched on the Col de Castellaras and whose remains date to the 13th century. It was abandoned after a fire in the 18th century. The village was then rebuilt at the current location.

The Count of Provence gave the lordship of Andon to Romée de Villeneuve in 1230. The lordship then passed to the family of Grasse-Bar, then to Russan then Théas. On the eve of the Revolution it belonged, with Thorenc, to Mr. de Fanton, a Lieutenant-General at the Grasse headquarters.

The death of Queen Joanna I of Naples created a crisis of succession for the head of the County of Provence. The cities of the Union of Aix (1382-1387) supported Charles of Duras against Louis I of Anjou. The Lord of Andon, Florent de Castellane, endorsed the Angevins in 1385 after the death of Louis I.

=== Canaux ===
Canaux appears in texts in 1251.

In 1421, the Countess of Provence gave this lordship to Bertrand de Grasse. The original village was located 1 km to the west.

In 1623, the Bishop of Grasse dared not climb to Canaux "as we are assured that the road is rough and bad". His successors were equally cautious.

=== Thorenc ===
Thorenc is mentioned in texts from 1200 under the name castrum de Torenc or Torenc. The village was originally a lordship of Grasse, then of Boniface de Castellane before depending the Count of Provence in 1235 who passed it to Romée de Villeneuve. The Lords of Thorenc only resided in the castle of the Four Towers a few months per year.

From 1348 village life was disturbed by the arrival of the Black Death that decimated the population and then by the war between the Angevins and Duras for the succession of the County of Provence. In 1384 and between January and October 1385, a gang leader called Vita de Blois was present at Thorenc who seized the lordship on behalf of the Count of Savoy. The text of the Truce of Nice of 3 November 1388, stated that Vita de Blois entered the service of Amédée VII with 25 spears and undertakes not to attack until the following May the Duchess of Anjou and her supporters from his castrum de Thorenc. There were still the ravages of the plague in the 15th century that drove people to leave the village.

In 1542 a branch of Villeneuve-Thorenc appeared with Claude I. His descendants were also lords of Saint-Jeannet and governors of Saint-Paul-de-Vence. Claude I of Villeneuve-Thorenc sold, in 1539, the Castle of the Four Towers to Rascas, Lord of Muy. He built a new castle in Haut-Thorenc. Antoine de Russan, who was called Virnasse Lord of Thorenc, of Malle, and of Pignans, would have bought the Lordship of Thorenc from Rascas of Muy around 1515. The Rascas family had sufficient money to follow François I to war. They held Thorenc from Charles of Anjou (after it having belonged to the Templars.) It was he who strengthened and renovated the castle. The castle then belonged to Raymond of Eoulx, Puget de Clermont, Calvy, Saint-André, then to the Count of Estang-Parade.

Towards 1515, the Russan family originally from Grasse (Simosse said of Russan that they were converted Jewish merchants the 3rd richest in the city in the 15th century who certainly came from Russan near Nîmes) were co-lords of Thorenc and owned land in Bas-Thorenc. An Act of 26 August 1520 recorded the sharing agreement of Thorenc land between Antoine de Villeneuve (of Haut-Thorenc) and Antoine de Russan (of Lower Thorenc). In 1640 at the wedding of Honorade de Russan, the Russans were still lords of Thorenc. In 1624, Antoine III de Russan, Squire of Thorenc, married his daughter Gasparde "acted, done and published audit at Thorenc and in the room of the house and castle of the Squire of Thorenc". (There may be some scepticism about the sale of the Castle of the Four Towers to Villeneuve in 1560 since it was in the Russan family from 1515 to at least 1624).

Antoine de Grasse inherited the Russan land and formed the line of Grasse-Thorenc with a share of the land of Bas-Thorenc with the other part belonging to Grasse-Saint-Cézaire. The fief of Grasse-Thorenc was purchased by the Lombards of Amirat in 1632. It was sold in 1708 to Paul de Théas, Lord of Caille. The marriage in 1746 of Anne-Marie, sister of François de Théas-Thorenc, to Albert de Durand de Sartoux brought the Castle of Barraque into the Durand de Sartoux family.

The Castle of the Four Towers was sold in 1560 by Rescas, Lord of Muy to Villeneuve-Mons and it then passed into the Villeneuve-Bargemon family. In the middle of the 18th century their heirs sold this part of the fief to Claude de Fanton, Lord of Andon and king's counsel in the Seneschal of Grasse.

After the Revolution, the territory of Thorenc became part of the commune of Andon.

The hygienism of the 19th century (based on the findings of Louis Pasteur) created the fashion of staying in Thorenc as a climate station using therapy for hygiene. The sanatorium of the clergy of France was built on the site of the castle of the abbots of Lérins.

=== Heraldry ===
Arms of Andon	Blazon: Argent, three trees Vert, in chief Azure charged with an eagle of Or between the letters A and R in gothic script.

== Administration ==
List of Successive Mayors

From	To	Name	Party	Position
1813	1816	Antoine Funel		
1818		Honoré Funel		
1826		Jean-Baptiste Fanton d'Andon		
1827		Antoine Funel		
1832		Honoré Funel		
1837		Pierre Michel		
1884		Michel Fortune		
1907		Michel Asprien		
1914		Bonhomme Sederin		
1918		Joseph Pellegrin		
1932		Victorin Bonhomme		
1938		Gabriel Michel Adolphe		
1938	1955	André Saytour		
1955	1971	Victorin Bonhomme		
1971	1982	Michel Dikansky		
1982	1983	Armand Rebuffel		
1983	1991	Roger Perrimond		
1991	2002	Adrien Prato		
2002	2020	Michèle Sicard-Olivier	UMP then LR	Former president of the Community of Communes of Monts d'Azur
2020	incumbent	David Varrone		

Partial municipal elections took place in 2002 following the revocation of Adrien Prato by judicial decision, leading to the election of Michèle Olivier.

== Population ==
The inhabitants of the commune are known as Andonnais or Andonnaises in French.

Historical population
Year	Pop.	±% p.a.
1968	341	—
1975	444	+3.84%
1982	249	−7.93%
1990	300	+2.36%
1999	341	+1.43%
2007	527	+5.59%
2012	568	+1.51%
2017	620	+1.77%
2023	665	+1.17%
Source: INSEE

== Sites and Monuments ==
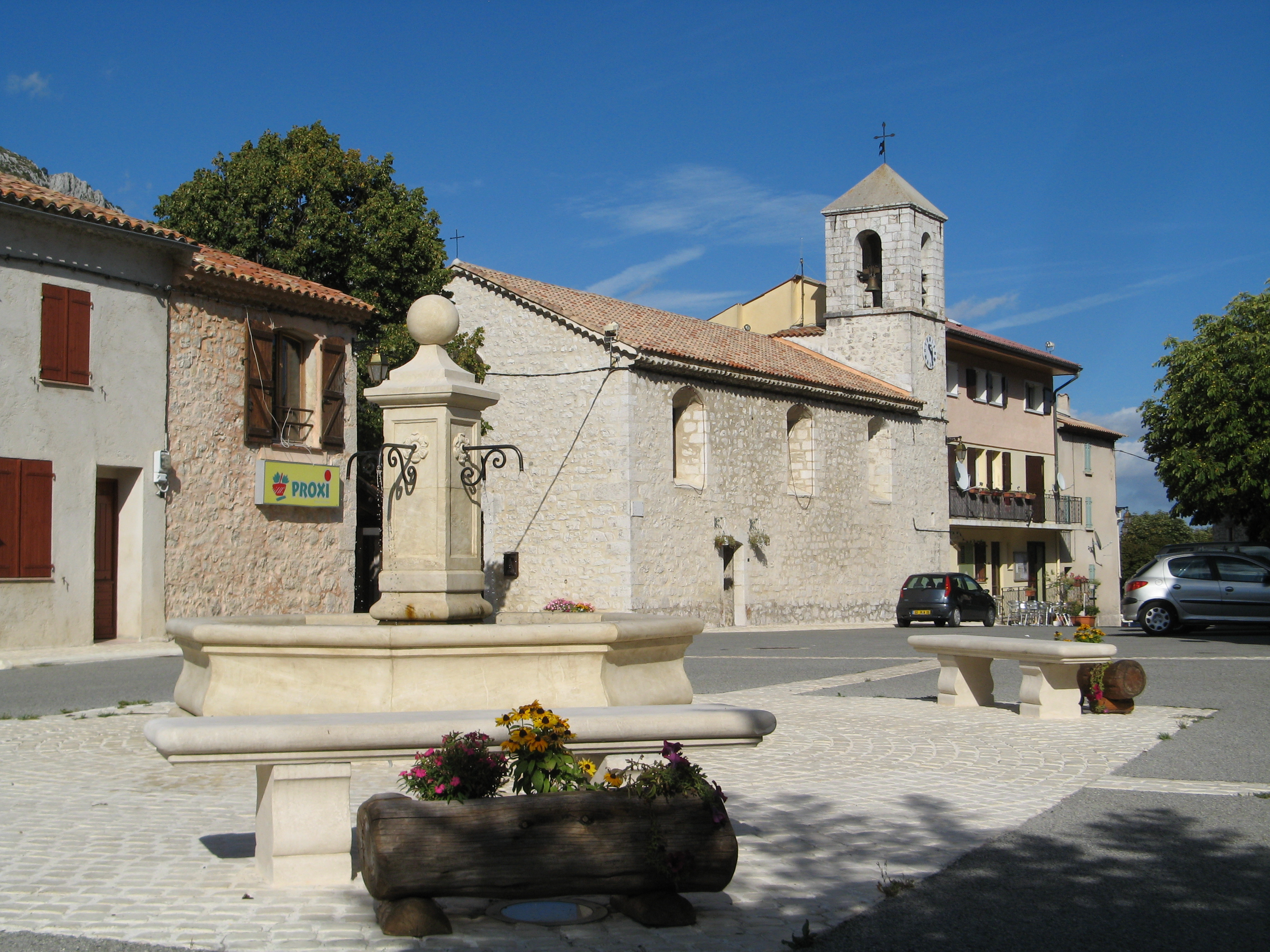
Victorin Bonhomme Square at the centre of the village and the church

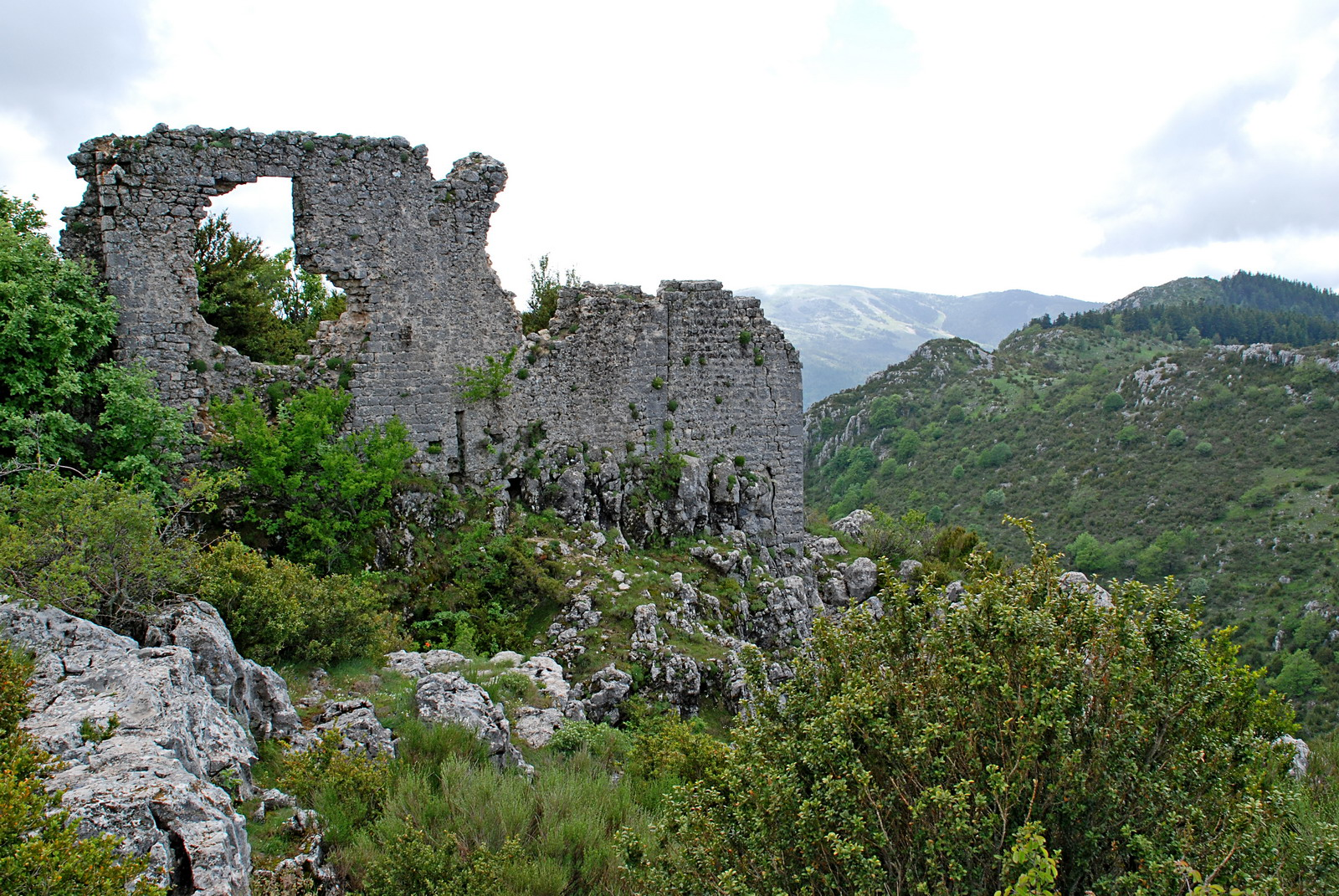
The ramparts of Castellaras de Thorenc

- The Church was of medieval origin but completely rebuilt in 1820. It contains a Stoup (12th century) which is registered as an historical object.
- The ruins of the Chapel of Saint-Hilaire, abandoned after the War of the Austrian Succession in 1746
- The oppidum of Font-Freye at 1211 m
- The Selle d'Andon where there was a priory dependent on the Abbey of Lérins. The site was occupied by the Romans. There is a Roman cemetery next to the chapel
- The Oratory of Saint Antoine, a former place of pilgrimage
- Audibergue Mountain with a peak at 1642 m. A ski resort was created there in 1960
- The Chasms of Audibergue
- The hamlet of Canaux with the ruins of the old village abandoned in the 14th century, the 5 Celtic-Ligurian camps, the Pitches of the Moulière Valley
- The Castellaras de Thorenc (Middle Ages) is a remnant of the medieval village with its castle and ramparts dating from the 12th and 14th centuries. The city was at the fork of an east-west Roman road and the medieval road from Grasse to Castellane
- The Château des Quatre-Tours (Chateau of Four Towers) is a fortified manor house built in the 15th century at Thorenc-Station

== See also ==
- Communes of the Alpes-Maritimes department
