= Collongues =

Collongues is the name of 2 communes in France:

- Collongues, Alpes-Maritimes, in the Alpes-Maritimes department
- Collongues, Hautes-Pyrénées, in the Hautes-Pyrénées department
