= Arrondissement of Grasse =

Coordinates: 43.67°N 6.92°E

Grasse
- Arrondissement
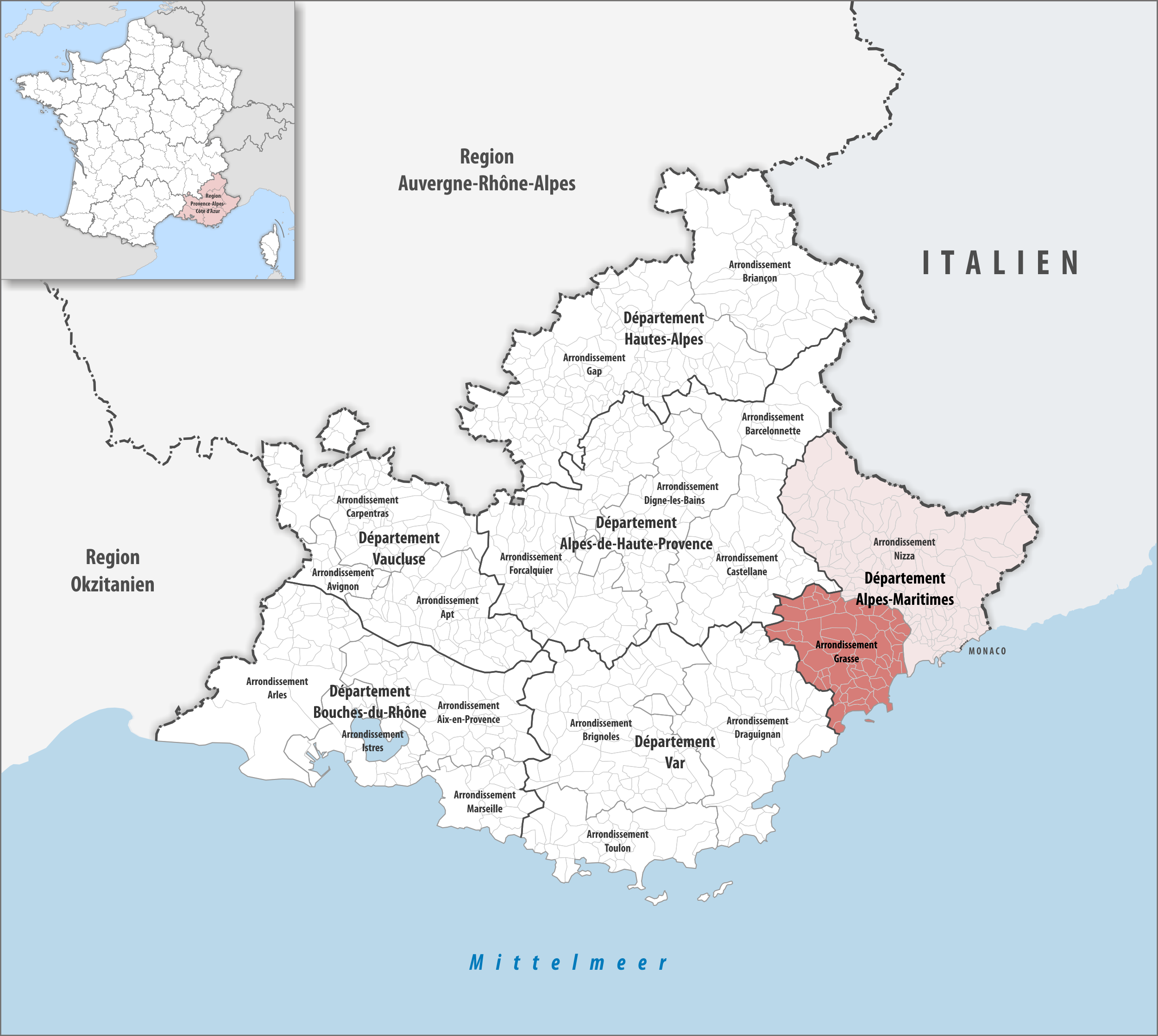
- Location within the region Provence-Alpes-Côte d'Azur
- Country: France
- Region: Provence-Alpes-Côte d'Azur
- Department: Alpes-Maritimes
- No. of communes: {{{nbcomm}}}
- Area: 1,231.2 km^{2} (475.4 sq mi)
- Population (2023): 587,779
  - Density: 477.40/km^{2} (1,236.5/sq mi)
- INSEE code: 061

The arrondissement of Grasse is an arrondissement of France in the Alpes-Maritimes department in the Provence-Alpes-Côte d'Azur region. It has 62 communes. Its population is 573,247 (2021), and its area is 1,231.2 km^{2} (475.4 sq mi).

== Composition ==
The communes of the arrondissement of Grasse, and their INSEE codes, are:

1. Aiglun (06001)
2. Amirat (06002)
3. Andon (06003)
4. Antibes (06004)
5. Auribeau-sur-Siagne (06007)
6. Le Bar-sur-Loup (06010)
7. Bézaudun-les-Alpes (06017)
8. Biot (06018)
9. Bouyon (06022)
10. Briançonnet (06024)
11. Le Broc (06025)
12. Cabris (06026)
13. Cagnes-sur-Mer (06027)
14. Caille (06028)
15. Cannes (06029)
16. Le Cannet (06030)
17. Carros (06033)
18. Caussols (06037)
19. Châteauneuf-Grasse (06038)
20. Cipières (06041)
21. La Colle-sur-Loup (06044)
22. Collongues (06045)
23. Conségudes (06047)
24. Courmes (06049)
25. Coursegoules (06050)
26. Escragnolles (06058)
27. Les Ferres (06061)
28. Gars (06063)
29. Gattières (06064)
30. La Gaude (06065)
31. Gourdon (06068)
32. Grasse (06069)
33. Gréolières (06070)
34. Mandelieu-la-Napoule (06079)
35. Le Mas (06081)
36. Mouans-Sartoux (06084)
37. Mougins (06085)
38. Les Mujouls (06087)
39. Opio (06089)
40. Pégomas (06090)
41. Peymeinade (06095)
42. La Roque-en-Provence (06107)
43. Roquefort-les-Pins (06105)
44. La Roquette-sur-Siagne (06108)
45. Le Rouret (06112)
46. Saint-Auban (06116)
47. Saint-Cézaire-sur-Siagne (06118)
48. Saint-Jeannet (06122)
49. Saint-Laurent-du-Var (06123)
50. Saint-Paul (06128)
51. Saint-Vallier-de-Thiey (06130)
52. Sallagriffon (06131)
53. Séranon (06134)
54. Spéracèdes (06137)
55. Théoule-sur-Mer (06138)
56. Le Tignet (06140)
57. Tourrettes-sur-Loup (06148)
58. Valbonne (06152)
59. Valderoure (06154)
60. Vallauris (06155)
61. Vence (06157)
62. Villeneuve-Loubet (06161)

== History ==
The arrondissement of Grasse was created in 1800 as part of the department Var. In 1860 it became part of the department Alpes-Maritimes.

As a result of the reorganisation of the cantons of France which came into effect in 2015, the borders of the cantons are no longer related to the borders of the arrondissements. The cantons of the arrondissement of Grasse were, as of January 2015:

1. Antibes-Biot
2. Antibes-Centre
3. Le Bar-sur-Loup
4. Cagnes-sur-Mer-Centre
5. Cagnes-sur-Mer-Ouest
6. Cannes-Centre
7. Cannes-Est
8. Le Cannet
9. Carros
10. Coursegoules
11. Grasse-Nord
12. Grasse-Sud
13. Mandelieu-Cannes-Ouest
14. Mougins
15. Saint-Auban
16. Saint-Laurent-du-Var-Cagnes-sur-Mer-Est
17. Saint-Vallier-de-Thiey
18. Vallauris-Antibes-Ouest
19. Vence
