= Spéracèdes =

Commune in Provence-Alpes-Côte d'Azur, France

Spéracèdes Las Perascedas (Occitan)
- Commune
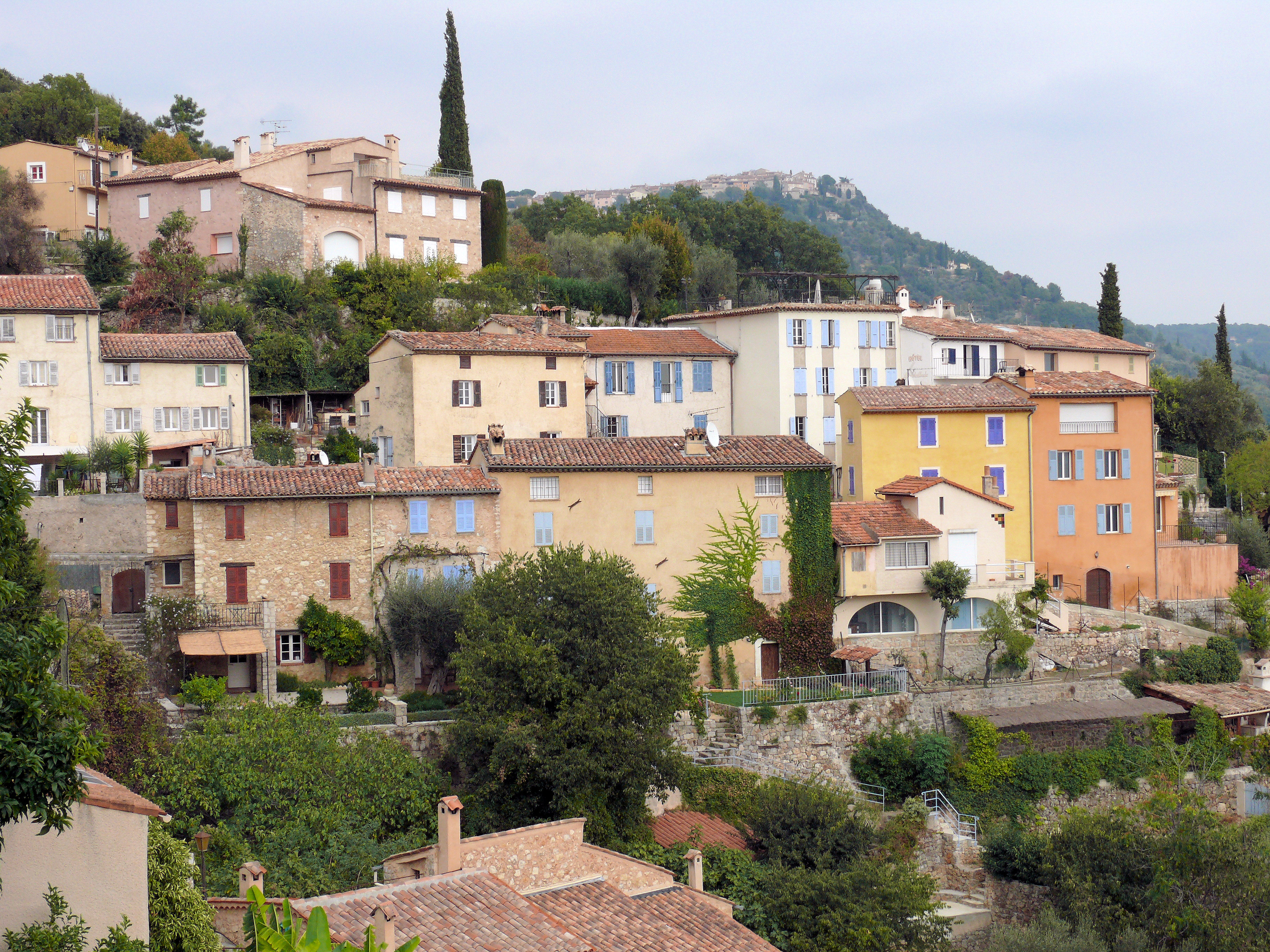
- View of the village towards Cabris

- Coat of arms
- Location of Spéracèdes
- Location within France Location within Provence-Alpes-Côte d'Azur
- Coordinates: 43°38′58″N 6°51′34″E
- Country: France
- Region: Provence-Alpes-Côte d'Azur
- Department: Alpes-Maritimes
- Arrondissement: Grasse
- Canton: Grasse-1
- Intercommunality: CA du Pays de Grasse

Government
  - Mayor (2026–32): Jean-Marc Macario
- Area^{1}: 3.46 km^{2} (1.34 sq mi)
- Elevation: 390 m (1,280 ft)
- Highest elevation: 790 m (2,590 ft)
- Lowest elevation: 204 m (669 ft)
- Population (2023): 1,241
  - Density: 359/km^{2} (929/sq mi)
- Demonym: Spéracèdois
- Time zone: UTC+01:00 (CET)
  - Summer (DST): UTC+02:00 (CEST)
- INSEE/Postal code: 06137 /06530
- Website: www.speracedes.fr
- ^{1} French Land Register data, which excludes lakes, ponds, glaciers > 1 km^{2} (0.386 sq mi or 247 acres) and river estuaries.

Spéracèdes (French pronunciation: [speʁasɛd]; Occitan: Las Perascedas; Italian, formerly: Speiraceta) is a commune in the Alpes-Maritimes department in the Provence-Alpes-Côte d'Azur region in Southeastern France.

Part of Préalpes d'Azur Regional Natural Park, Spéracèdes is located 7 km (4.3 mi) west of Grasse and 25 km (15.5 mi) northwest of Cannes on the Mediterranean coast. Its inhabitants are called Spéracèdois (masculine) and Spéracèdoises (feminine) in French.

== Demographics ==
Historical population
Year	Pop.	±% p.a.
1968	531	—
1975	674	+3.47%
1982	764	+1.81%
1990	1,029	+3.79%
1999	1,095	+0.69%
2007	1,126	+0.35%
2012	1,279	+2.58%
2017	1,264	−0.24%
2023	1,241	−0.31%
Source: INSEE

== See also ==
- Communes of the Alpes-Maritimes department
