= Communes of the Alpes-Maritimes department =

The following is a list of the 163 communes of the Alpes-Maritimes department of France.

The communes cooperate in the following intercommunalities (as of 2025):

- Métropole Nice Côte d'Azur
- Communauté d'agglomération Cannes Pays de Lérins
- Communauté d'agglomération du Pays de Grasse
- Communauté d'agglomération de la Riviera Française
- Communauté d'agglomération de Sophia Antipolis
- Communauté de communes Alpes d'Azur
- Communauté de communes du Pays des Paillons

INSEE	Postal	Commune
06001	06910	Aiglun
06002	06910	Amirat
06003	06750	Andon
06004	06160	Antibes
06005	06260	Ascros
06006	06790	Aspremont
06007	06810	Auribeau-sur-Siagne
06008	06260	Auvare
06009	06420	Bairols
06010	06620	Le Bar-sur-Loup
06011	06310	Beaulieu-sur-Mer
06012	06240	Beausoleil
06013	06450	Belvédère
06014	06390	Bendejun
06015	06390	Berre-les-Alpes
06016	06470	Beuil
06017	06510	Bézaudun-les-Alpes
06018	06410	Biot
06019	06440	Blausasc
06020	06450	La Bollène-Vésubie
06021	06830	Bonson
06022	06510	Bouyon
06023	06540	Breil-sur-Roya
06024	06850	Briançonnet
06162	06430	La Brigue
06025	06510	Le Broc
06026	06530	Cabris
06027	06800	Cagnes-sur-Mer
06028	06750	Caille
06029	06400	Cannes
06030	06110	Le Cannet
06031	06340	Cantaron
06032	06320	Cap-d'Ail
06033	06510	Carros
06034	06670	Castagniers
06035	06500	Castellar
06036	06500	Castillon
06037	06460	Caussols
06040	06470	Châteauneuf-d'Entraunes
06038	06740	Châteauneuf-Grasse
06039	06390	Châteauneuf-Villevieille
06041	06620	Cipières
06042	06420	Clans
06043	06390	Coaraze
06044	06480	La Colle-sur-Loup
06045	06910	Collongues
06046	06670	Colomars
06047	06510	Conségudes
06048	06390	Contes
06049	06620	Courmes
06050	06140	Coursegoules
06051	06260	La Croix-sur-Roudoule
06052	06910	Cuébris
06053	06470	Daluis
06054	06340	Drap
06055	06670	Duranus
06056	06470	Entraunes
06057	06440	L'Escarène
06058	06460	Escragnolles
06059	06360	Èze
06060	06950	Falicon
06061	06510	Les Ferres
06062	06540	Fontan
06063	06850	Gars
06064	06510	Gattières
06065	06610	La Gaude
06066	06830	Gilette
06067	06500	Gorbio
06068	06620	Gourdon
06069	06520	Grasse
06070	06620	Gréolières
06071	06470	Guillaumes
06072	06420	Ilonse
06073	06420	Isola
06074	06450	Lantosque
06075	06670	Levens
06076	06260	Lieuche
06077	06440	Lucéram
06078	06710	Malaussène
06079	06210	Mandelieu-la-Napoule
06080	06420	Marie
06081	06910	Le Mas

INSEE	Postal	Commune
06082	06710	Massoins
06083	06500	Menton
06084	06370	Mouans-Sartoux
06085	06250	Mougins
06086	06380	Moulinet
06087	06910	Les Mujouls
06088	06000	Nice
06089	06650	Opio
06090	06580	Pégomas
06091	06440	Peille
06092	06440	Peillon
06093	06260	La Penne
06094	06470	Péone
06095	06530	Peymeinade
06096	06260	Pierlas
06097	06910	Pierrefeu
06098	06260	Puget-Rostang
06099	06260	Puget-Théniers
06100	06830	Revest-les-Roches
06101	06260	Rigaud
06102	06420	Rimplas
06103	06450	Roquebillière
06104	06190	Roquebrune-Cap-Martin
06107	06910	La Roque-en-Provence
06105	06330	Roquefort-les-Pins
06106	06910	Roquestéron
06108	06550	La Roquette-sur-Siagne
06109	06670	La Roquette-sur-Var
06110	06420	Roubion
06111	06420	Roure
06112	06650	Le Rouret
06114	06730	Saint-André-de-la-Roche
06115	06260	Saint-Antonin
06116	06850	Saint-Auban
06117	06670	Saint-Blaise
06118	06530	Saint-Cézaire-sur-Siagne
06119	06660	Saint-Dalmas-le-Selvage
06113	06500	Sainte-Agnès
06120	06660	Saint-Étienne-de-Tinée
06121	06230	Saint-Jean-Cap-Ferrat
06122	06640	Saint-Jeannet
06123	06700	Saint-Laurent-du-Var
06124	06260	Saint-Léger
06125	06470	Saint-Martin-d'Entraunes
06126	06670	Saint-Martin-du-Var
06127	06450	Saint-Martin-Vésubie
06128	06570	Saint-Paul
06129	06420	Saint-Sauveur-sur-Tinée
06130	06460	Saint-Vallier-de-Thiey
06131	06910	Sallagriffon
06132	06540	Saorge
06133	06470	Sauze
06134	06750	Séranon
06135	06910	Sigale
06136	06380	Sospel
06137	06530	Spéracèdes
06163	06430	Tende
06138	06590	Théoule-sur-Mer
06139	06710	Thiéry
06140	06530	Le Tignet
06141	06830	Toudon
06142	06440	Touët-de-l'Escarène
06143	06710	Touët-sur-Var
06144	06710	La Tour
06145	06830	Tourette-du-Château
06146	06710	Tournefort
06147	06690	Tourrette-Levens
06148	06140	Tourrettes-sur-Loup
06149	06340	La Trinité
06150	06320	La Turbie
06151	06450	Utelle
06152	06560	Valbonne
06153	06420	Valdeblore
06154	06750	Valderoure
06155	06220	Vallauris
06156	06450	Venanson
06157	06140	Vence
06158	06710	Villars-sur-Var
06159	06230	Villefranche-sur-Mer
06160	06470	Villeneuve-d'Entraunes
06161	06270	Villeneuve-Loubet
