= Caille, Alpes-Maritimes =

Commune in Provence-Alpes-Côte d'Azur, France

Caille
- Commune
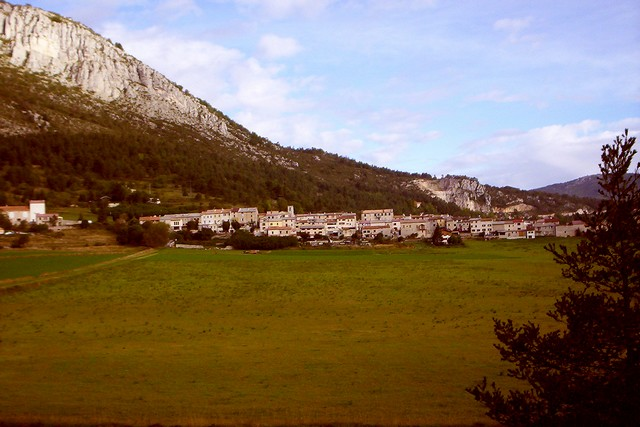
- A general view of Caille

- Coat of arms
- Location of Caille
- Location within France Location within Provence-Alpes-Côte d'Azur
- Coordinates: 43°46′47″N 6°43′53″E
- Country: France
- Region: Provence-Alpes-Côte d'Azur
- Department: Alpes-Maritimes
- Arrondissement: Grasse
- Canton: Grasse-1
- Intercommunality: CA Pays de Grasse

Government
  - Mayor (2026–32): Adrien Prato
- Area^{1}: 16.96 km^{2} (6.55 sq mi)
- Elevation: 1,160 m (3,810 ft)
- Highest elevation: 1,644 m (5,394 ft)
- Lowest elevation: 1,122 m (3,681 ft)
- Population (2023): 441
  - Density: 26.0/km^{2} (67.3/sq mi)
- Time zone: UTC+01:00 (CET)
  - Summer (DST): UTC+02:00 (CEST)
- INSEE/Postal code: 06028 /06750
- ^{1} French Land Register data, which excludes lakes, ponds, glaciers > 1 km^{2} (0.386 sq mi or 247 acres) and river estuaries.

Caille (French pronunciation: [kaj]; Occitan: Calha; Italian: Caglia) is a commune in the Alpes-Maritimes department in southeastern France.

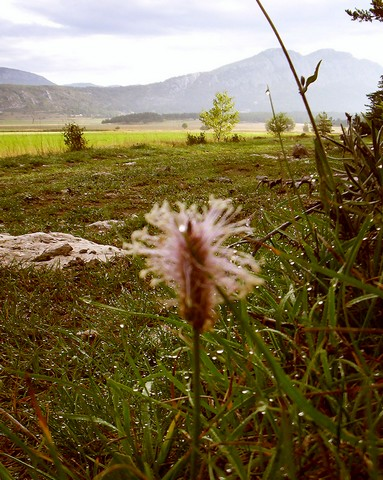
Caille plain

== Geography ==
Caille is built on a rocky outcrop in a glacial peneplain. Near to Bauroux, one of the major summits of the Alps, the village is surrounded by coniferous forests. Caille is constructed on an East-West axis along a single main street, which leads to the village of Andon, six kilometres away. Caille was a fundamentally agrarian town and although the population of farmers has halved in the last 30 years, cereal crops, sheep and cattle are still farmed there today by two families. Recently, there has been a drive towards tourism and the village features gîtes, mountain biking courses, an adventure playground, a ski slope and a gallery exhibiting local artists.

== History ==
Caille takes its name from the Indo-European root word Cal, meaning a place overlooking a rock. Caille is also the French word for quail, and the local church, rectory and town hall all feature carvings of quails. Although there was a human presence in the Caille region in antiquity, it was not until the late 15th century that the name of Caille is mentioned in official documents as Calha. Two large families were recorded in the region; 'De Castellane' (of Castellane) and 'Brun de Castellane' (Brown of Castellane). From the 17th to 18th century, the ruling family of Caille were 'Théas'. In 1790, when the National Constituent Assembly created the department of Var, it was included in the canton of Séranon. In 1801, when the number of cantons was reduced, it was included in the canton of Saint-Auban. Since 2015, it is part of the canton of Grasse-1.

== Population ==
Historical population
Year	Pop.	±% p.a.
1968	124	—
1975	109	−1.83%
1982	144	+4.06%
1990	176	+2.54%
1999	220	+2.51%
2007	318	+4.71%
2012	403	+4.85%
2017	426	+1.12%
2023	441	+0.58%
Source: INSEE

== See also ==
- Communes of the Alpes-Maritimes department
