= Amirat =

Commune in Provence-Alpes-Côte d'Azur, France

Amirat Amiral (Occitan) Ammirato (Italian)
- Commune
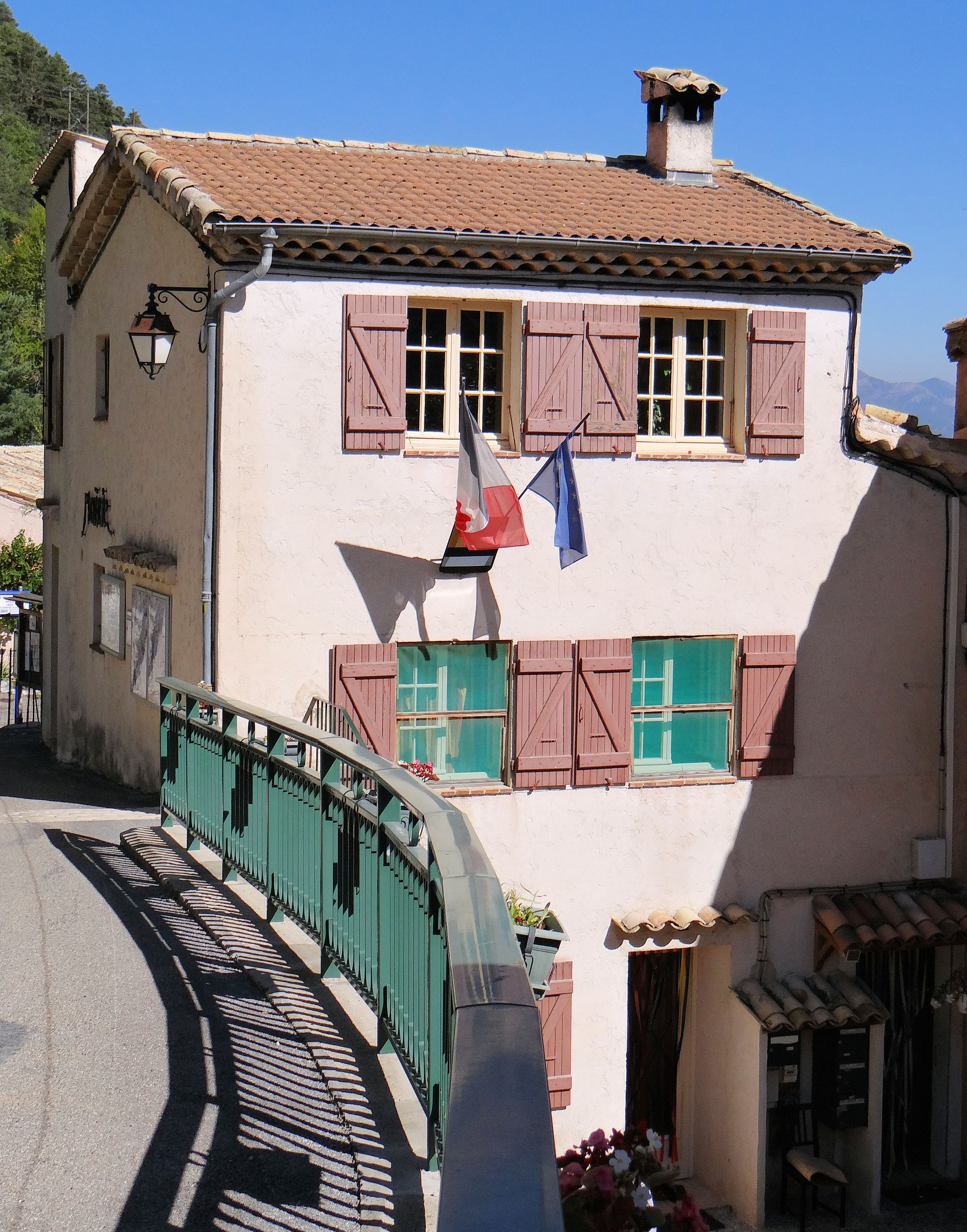
- The town hall of Amirat

- Coat of arms
- Location of Amirat
- Location within France Location within Provence-Alpes-Côte d'Azur
- Coordinates: 43°53′29″N 6°49′30″E
- Country: France
- Region: Provence-Alpes-Côte d'Azur
- Department: Alpes-Maritimes
- Arrondissement: Grasse
- Canton: Grasse-1
- Intercommunality: Pays de Grasse

Government
  - Mayor (2026–32): Jean-Louis Conil
- Area^{1}: 12.95 km^{2} (5.00 sq mi)
- Elevation: 860 m (2,820 ft)
- Highest elevation: 1,373 m (4,505 ft)
- Lowest elevation: 725 m (2,379 ft)
- Population (2023): 45
  - Density: 3.5/km^{2} (9.0/sq mi)
- Time zone: UTC+01:00 (CET)
  - Summer (DST): UTC+02:00 (CEST)
- INSEE/Postal code: 06002 /06910
- ^{1} French Land Register data, which excludes lakes, ponds, glaciers > 1 km^{2} (0.386 sq mi or 247 acres) and river estuaries.

Amirat (French pronunciation: [amiʁa]; Occitan: Amiral; Italian: Ammirato) is a commune in the Alpes-Maritimes department in southeastern France.

== Geography ==
This little village is made up of three quarters:

- The Agots, with the church and the hostel.
- Amirat village, where the mayor's office is located.
- Maupoil, location of the 16th century Saint Jeannet's Chapel.

== Politics ==
Amirat had the fourth highest percentage of people who voted for Jean-Marie Le Pen of all French communes during the second round of voting in 2002 - 59.26%.

== Population ==
The commune's inhabitants are known as Amiratois in French.

Historical population
Year	Pop.	±% p.a.
1968	39	—
1975	40	+0.36%
1982	72	+8.76%
1990	50	−4.46%
1999	41	−2.18%
2007	35	−1.96%
2012	63	+12.47%
2017	67	+1.24%
2023	45	−6.42%
Source: INSEE

== Sights ==
Saint Jeannet's Chapel, a 16th-century chapel with lovely wooden gate in Maupoil.

== See also ==
- Communes of the Alpes-Maritimes department
