= Canton of Saint-Laurent-du-Var-Cagnes-sur-Mer-Est =

Coordinates: 43°40′05″N 7°11′17″E

Saint-Laurent-du-Var- Cagnes-sur-Mer-Est
- Former canton
- Interactive map of Saint-Laurent-du-Var- Cagnes-sur-Mer-Est
- Country: France
- Region: Provence-Alpes-Côte d'Azur
- Department: Alpes-Maritimes
- No. of communes: {{{nbcomm}}}
- Disbanded: 2015
- Population (2012): 37,102

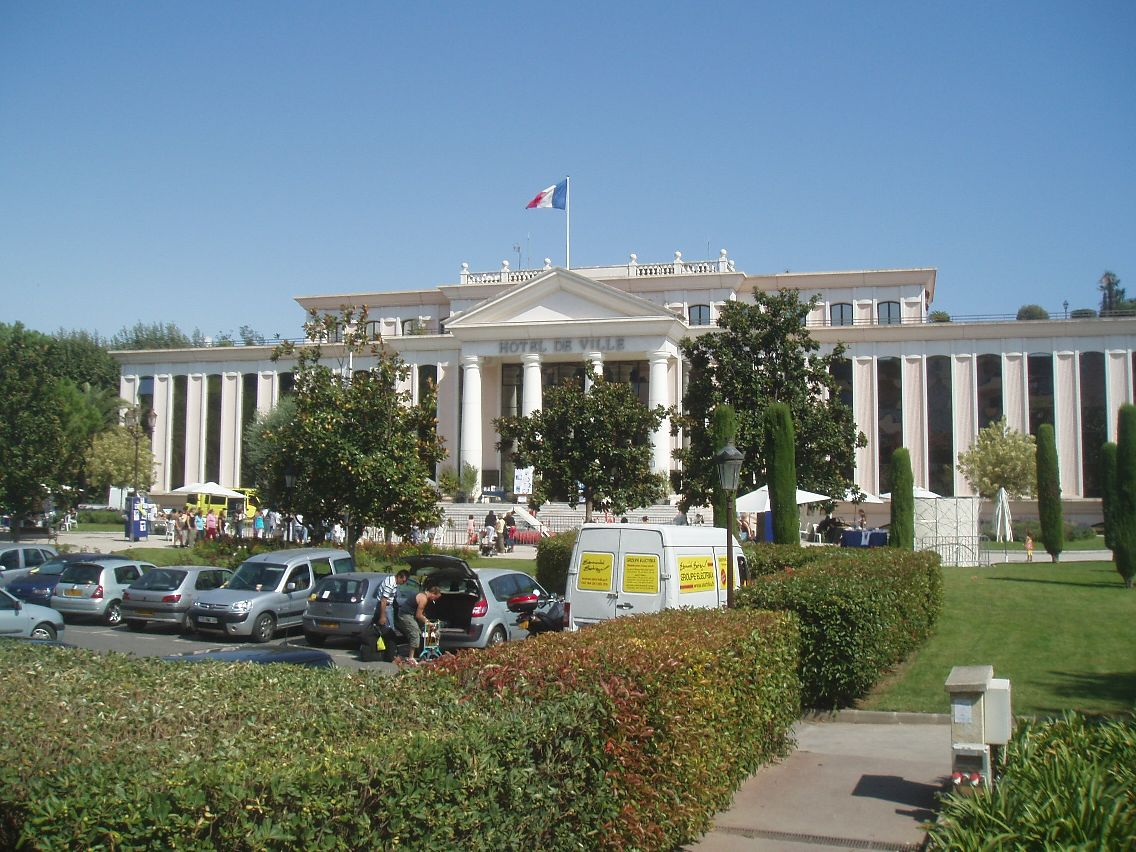
seat hall of St. Laurent du Var

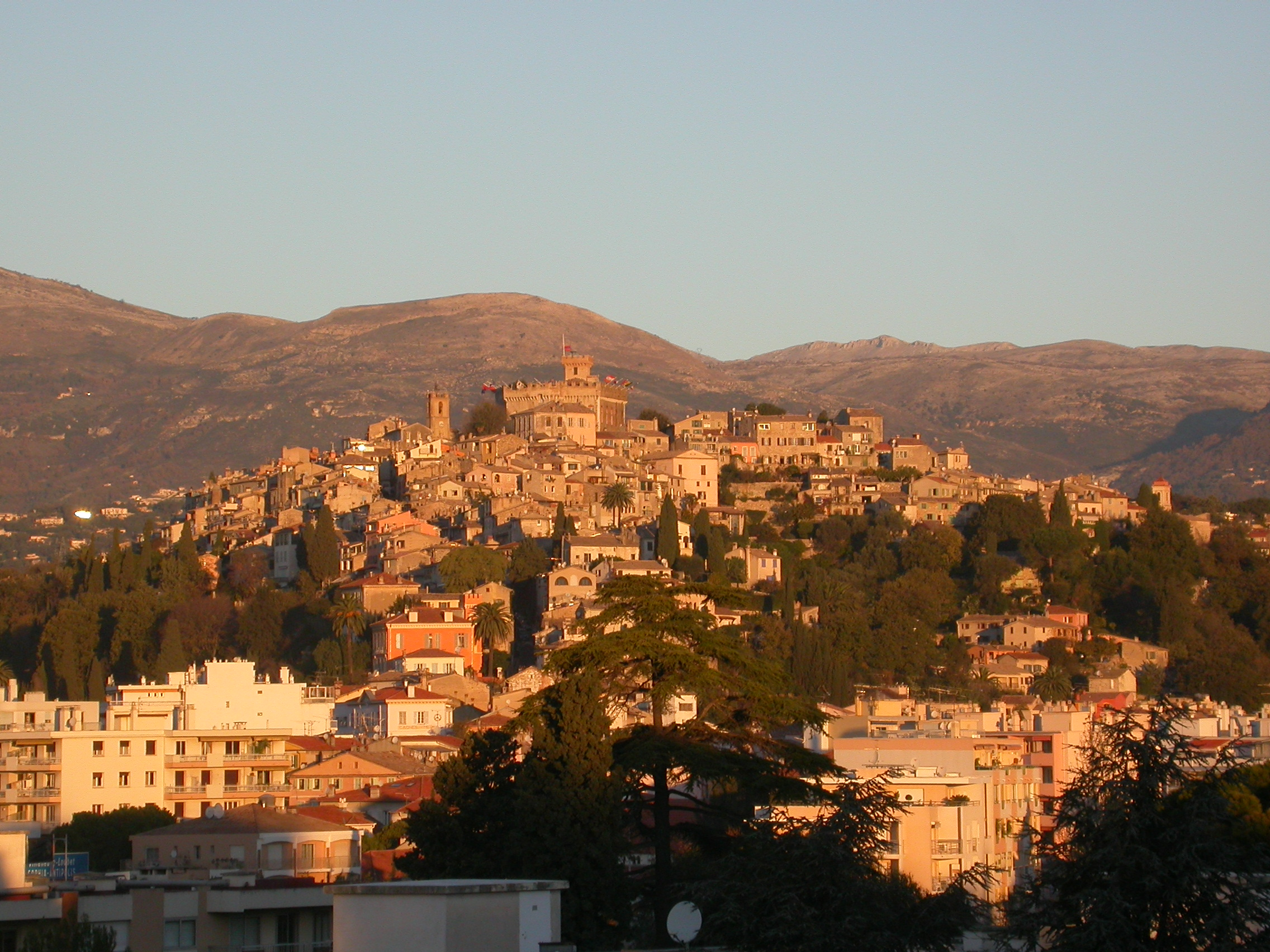
View of Cagnes with the castle

The Canton of Saint-Laurent-du-Var-Cagnes-sur-Mer-Est is a former French canton, located in the arrondissement of Grasse, in the Alpes-Maritimes département (Provence-Alpes-Côte d'Azur région). It had 37,102 inhabitants (2012).

== History ==
The canton was created in 1982 adding part of Cagnes-sur-Mer to the pre-existent Canton of Saint-Laurent-du-Var. It was disbanded following the French canton reorganisation which came into effect in March 2015.

== Geography ==
=== Municipalities ===
The canton comprised the following 2 communes:

- Saint-Laurent-du-Var (administrative seat)
- Cagnes-sur-Mer (limited tho the eastern part)

=== Description ===
Only the eastern part of Cagnes, close to the borders with Cros-de-Cagnes, is part of this canton. The town is also part (and seat) of the cantons Cagnes-sur-Mer-Centre and Cagnes-sur-Mer-Ouest (C. West).

== Demographics ==
Historical population
Year	Pop.	±%
1999	34,553	—
2007	38,620	+11.8%
2012	37,102	−3.9%

== See also ==
- Métropole Nice Côte d'Azur
- Cantons of the Alpes-Maritimes department
- Arrondissements of the Alpes-Maritimes department
