= Canton of Grasse-1 =

Coordinates: 43.66°N 6.92°E

- Canton
- Situation of the canton of Grasse-1 in the department of Alpes-Maritimes
- Country: France
- Region: Provence-Alpes-Côte d'Azur
- Department: Alpes-Maritimes
- No. of communes: {{{nbcomm}}}
- Population (2023): 44,380
- INSEE code: 0611

The canton of Grasse-1 is an administrative division of the Alpes-Maritimes department, southeastern France. It was created at the French canton reorganisation which came into effect in March 2015. Its seat is in Grasse.

It consists of the following communes:

1. Amirat
2. Andon
3. Briançonnet
4. Cabris
5. Caille
6. Collongues
7. Escragnolles
8. Gars
9. Grasse (partly)
10. Le Mas
11. Les Mujouls
12. Peymeinade
13. Saint-Auban
14. Saint-Cézaire-sur-Siagne
15. Saint-Vallier-de-Thiey
16. Séranon
17. Spéracèdes
18. Le Tignet
19. Valderoure
