= Bézaudun-les-Alpes =

Commune in Provence-Alpes-Côte d'Azur, France

- Commune
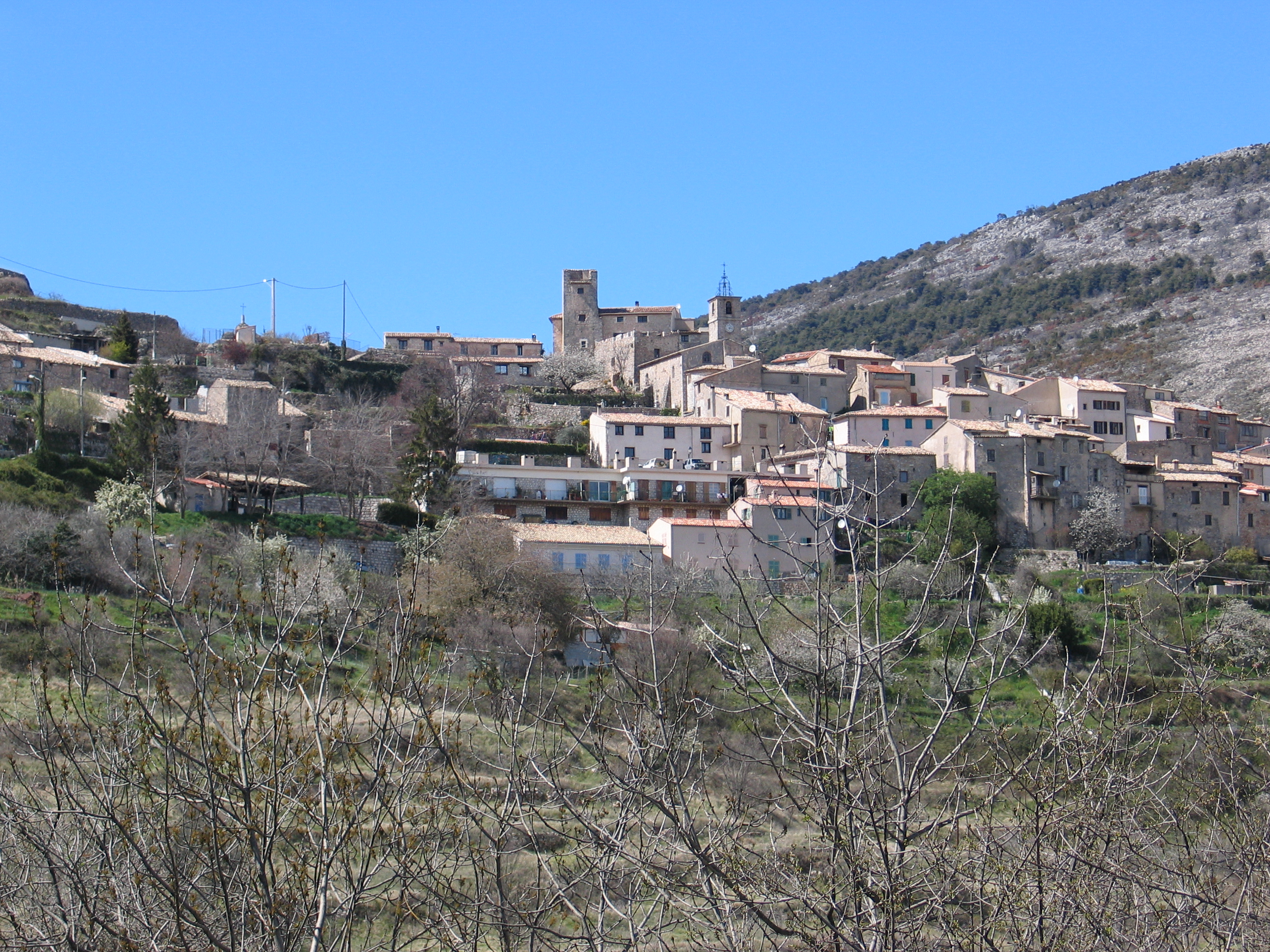
- A general view of the village

- Coat of arms
- Location of Bézaudun-les-Alpes
- Location within France Location within Provence-Alpes-Côte d'Azur
- Coordinates: 43°48′29″N 7°05′48″E
- Country: France
- Region: Provence-Alpes-Côte d'Azur
- Department: Alpes-Maritimes
- Arrondissement: Grasse
- Canton: Vence
- Intercommunality: CA Sophia Antipolis

Government
  - Mayor (2026–32): Jean-Paul Arnaud
- Area^{1}: 21.44 km^{2} (8.28 sq mi)
- Elevation: 860 m (2,820 ft)
- Highest elevation: 1,340 m (4,400 ft)
- Lowest elevation: 560 m (1,840 ft)
- Population (2023): 256
  - Density: 11.9/km^{2} (30.9/sq mi)
- Time zone: UTC+01:00 (CET)
  - Summer (DST): UTC+02:00 (CEST)
- INSEE/Postal code: 06017 /06510
- ^{1} French Land Register data, which excludes lakes, ponds, glaciers > 1 km^{2} (0.386 sq mi or 247 acres) and river estuaries.

Bézaudun-les-Alpes (French pronunciation: [bezodœ̃ le.z‿alp]; Occitan: Beudun; Italian: Besalduno) is a commune in the Alpes-Maritimes department in southeastern France.

== Population ==
Historical population
Year	Pop.	±% p.a.
1968	64	—
1975	61	−0.68%
1982	80	+3.95%
1990	87	+1.05%
1999	143	+5.68%
2007	172	+2.33%
2012	233	+6.26%
2017	249	+1.34%
2023	256	+0.46%
Source: INSEE

== See also ==
- Communes of the Alpes-Maritimes department
