= Les Ferres =

Commune in Provence-Alpes-Côte d'Azur, France

- Commune
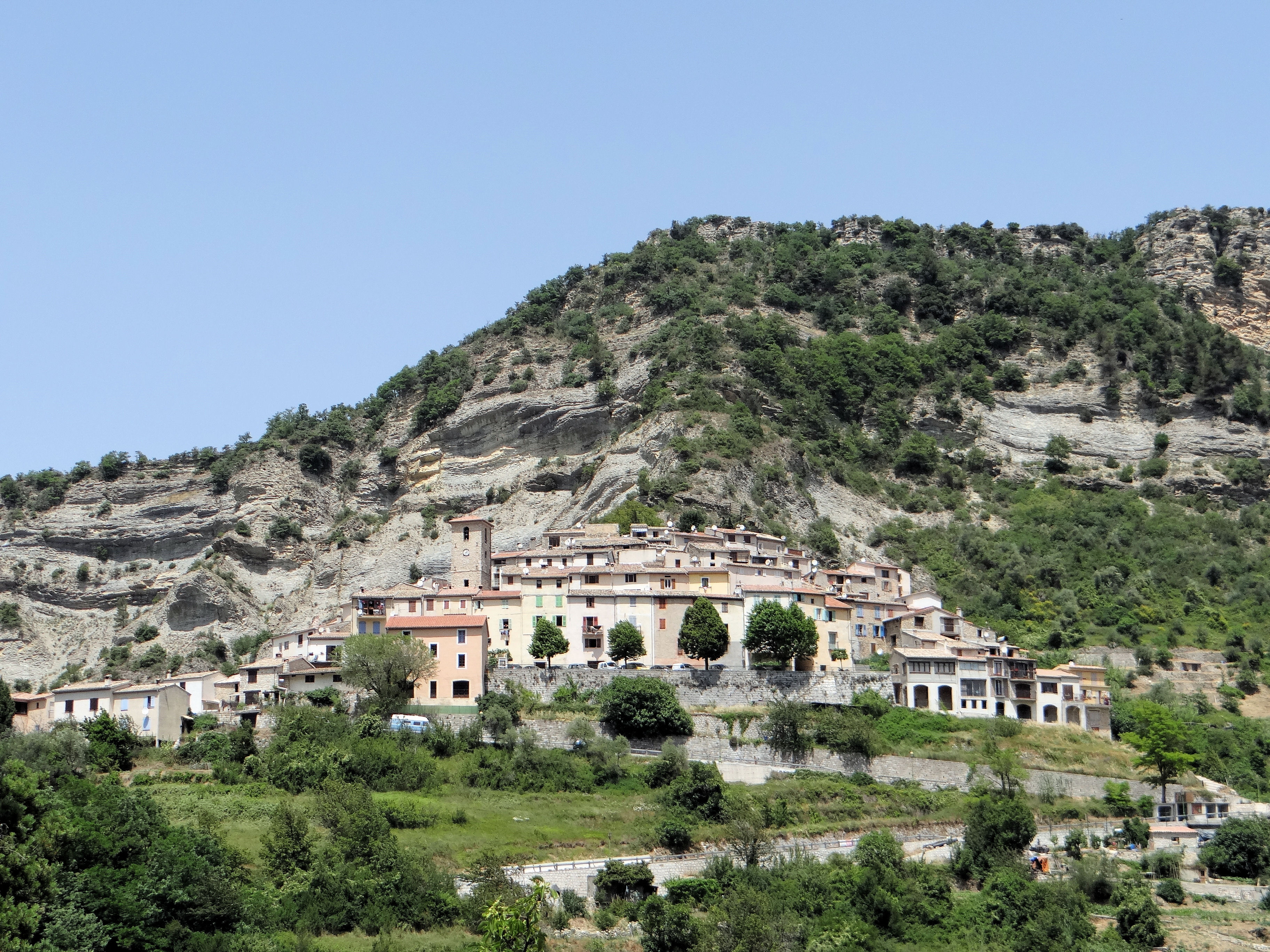
- A general view of Les Ferres

- Coat of arms
- Location of Les Ferres
- Location within France Location within Provence-Alpes-Côte d'Azur
- Coordinates: 43°50′52″N 7°05′41″E
- Country: France
- Region: Provence-Alpes-Côte d'Azur
- Department: Alpes-Maritimes
- Arrondissement: Grasse
- Canton: Vence
- Intercommunality: CA Sophia Antipolis

Government
  - Mayor (2026–32): Georges Tossan
- Area^{1}: 13.7 km^{2} (5.3 sq mi)
- Elevation: 615 m (2,018 ft)
- Highest elevation: 1,278 m (4,193 ft)
- Lowest elevation: 180 m (590 ft)
- Population (2023): 93
  - Density: 6.8/km^{2} (18/sq mi)
- Time zone: UTC+01:00 (CET)
  - Summer (DST): UTC+02:00 (CEST)
- INSEE/Postal code: 06061 /06510
- ^{1} French Land Register data, which excludes lakes, ponds, glaciers > 1 km^{2} (0.386 sq mi or 247 acres) and river estuaries.

Les Ferres (French pronunciation: [le fɛʁ]; Occitan: Sei Ferres; Italian: Ferre) is a commune in the Alpes-Maritimes department in southeastern France.

== Population ==
Historical population
Year	Pop.	±% p.a.
1968	71	—
1975	35	−9.61%
1982	40	+1.93%
1990	36	−1.31%
1999	59	+5.64%
2007	89	+5.27%
2012	96	+1.53%
2017	105	+1.81%
2023	93	−2.00%
Source: INSEE

== See also ==
- Communes of the Alpes-Maritimes department
