= Sallagriffon =

Commune in Provence-Alpes-Côte d'Azur, France

Sallagriffon Salagrifon (Occitan)
- Commune
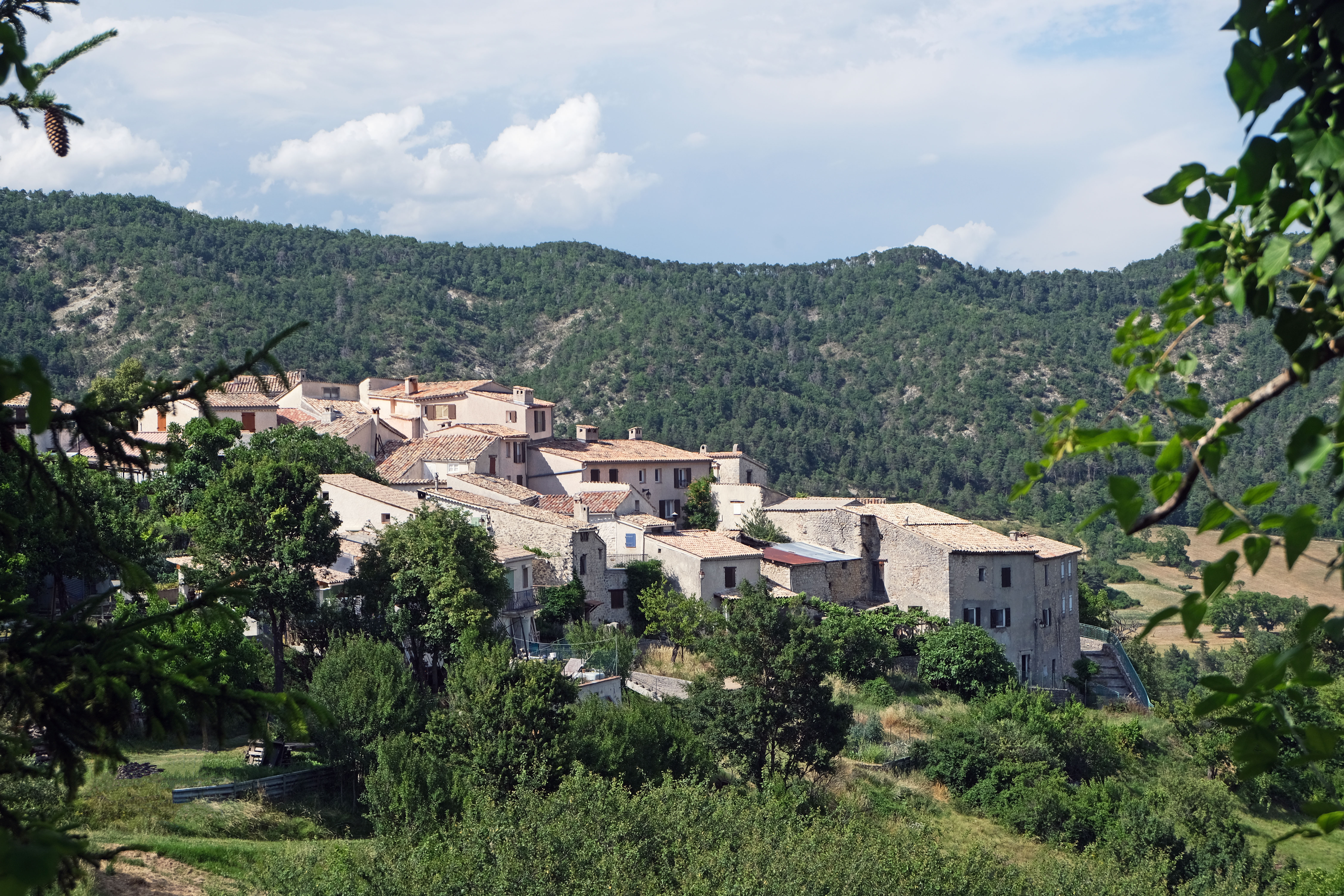
- A view of the village of Sallagriffon from the Route de la Vignasse, looking north

- Coat of arms
- Location of Sallagriffon
- Location within France Location within Provence-Alpes-Côte d'Azur
- Coordinates: 43°53′02″N 6°54′28″E
- Country: France
- Region: Provence-Alpes-Côte d'Azur
- Department: Alpes-Maritimes
- Arrondissement: Grasse
- Canton: Vence
- Intercommunality: CC Alpes d'Azur

Government
  - Mayor (2026–32): Guy Raybaud
- Area^{1}: 9.59 km^{2} (3.70 sq mi)
- Elevation: 720 m (2,360 ft)
- Highest elevation: 1,259 m (4,131 ft)
- Lowest elevation: 557 m (1,827 ft)
- Population (2023): 47
  - Density: 4.9/km^{2} (13/sq mi)
- Demonym: Sallagriffonais
- Time zone: UTC+01:00 (CET)
  - Summer (DST): UTC+02:00 (CEST)
- INSEE/Postal code: 06131 /06910
- Website: sallagriffon.fr
- ^{1} French Land Register data, which excludes lakes, ponds, glaciers > 1 km^{2} (0.386 sq mi or 247 acres) and river estuaries.

Sallagriffon (French pronunciation: [salaɡʁifɔ̃]; Occitan: Salagrifon; Italian, formerly: Sallagriffone) is a rural commune in the Alpes-Maritimes department in Southeastern France. It is part of Préalpes d'Azur Regional Natural Park.

== Population ==
Historical population
Year	Pop.	±% p.a.
1968	26	—
1975	31	+2.54%
1982	47	+6.13%
1990	47	+0.00%
1999	54	+1.55%
2007	53	−0.23%
2012	45	−3.22%
2017	49	+1.72%
2023	47	−0.69%
Source: INSEE

== See also ==
- Communes of the Alpes-Maritimes department
