= Gars, Alpes-Maritimes =

Commune in Provence-Alpes-Côte d'Azur, France

Gars
- Commune
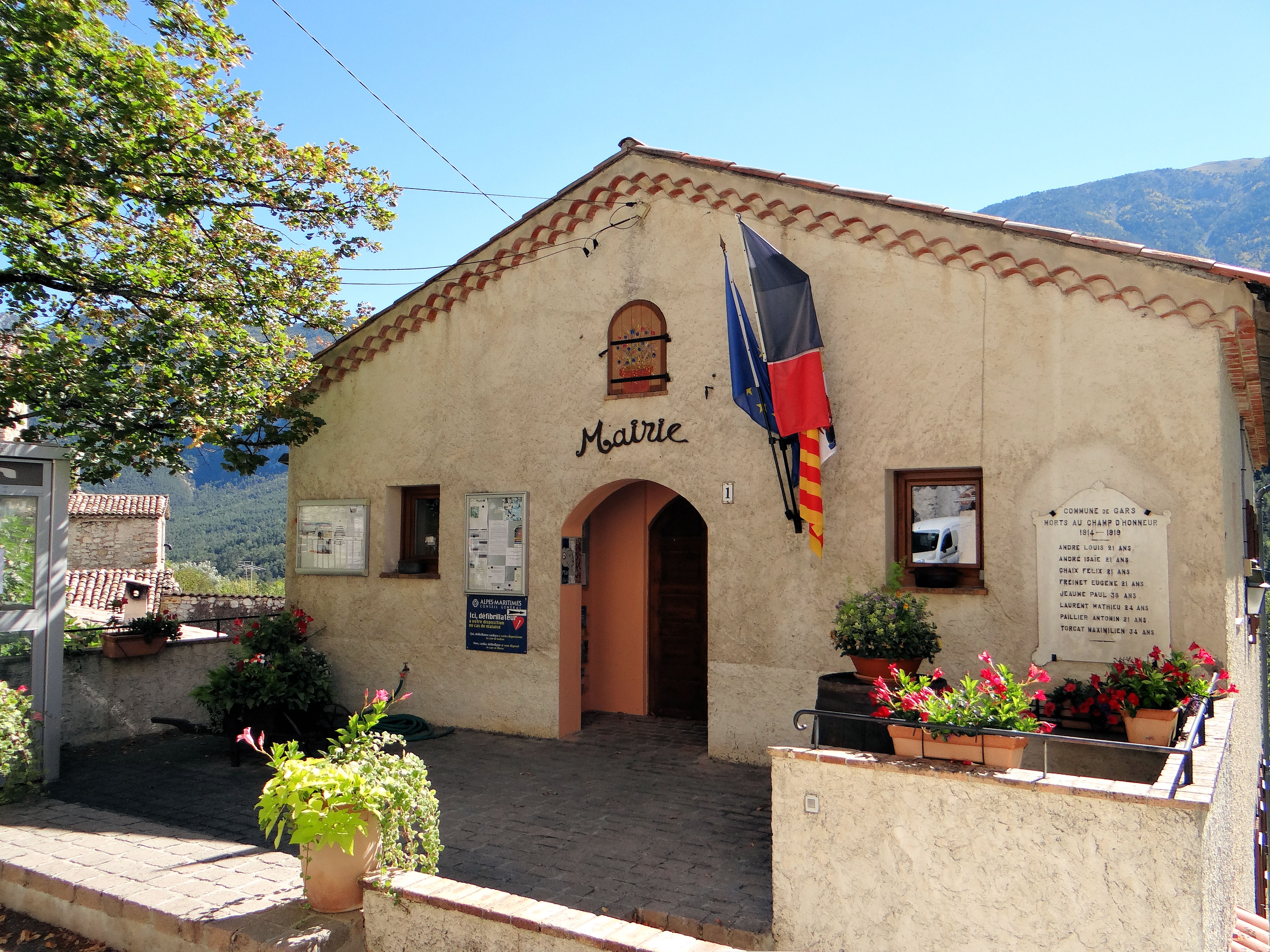
- The town hall of Gars

- Coat of arms
- Location of Gars
- Location within France Location within Provence-Alpes-Côte d'Azur
- Coordinates: 43°51′59″N 6°48′14″E
- Country: France
- Region: Provence-Alpes-Côte d'Azur
- Department: Alpes-Maritimes
- Arrondissement: Grasse
- Canton: Grasse-1
- Intercommunality: CA Pays de Grasse

Government
  - Mayor (2026–32): Marino Cassez
- Area^{1}: 15.57 km^{2} (6.01 sq mi)
- Elevation: 732 m (2,402 ft)
- Highest elevation: 1,649 m (5,410 ft)
- Lowest elevation: 640 m (2,100 ft)
- Population (2023): 65
  - Density: 4.2/km^{2} (11/sq mi)
- Time zone: UTC+01:00 (CET)
  - Summer (DST): UTC+02:00 (CEST)
- INSEE/Postal code: 06063 /06850
- ^{1} French Land Register data, which excludes lakes, ponds, glaciers > 1 km^{2} (0.386 sq mi or 247 acres) and river estuaries.

Gars (Occitan: Gai) is a commune in the Alpes-Maritimes department in southeastern France.

== Population ==
The inhabitants are called Garcinois in French.

Historical population
Year	Pop.	±% p.a.
1968	73	—
1975	64	−1.86%
1982	83	+3.78%
1990	70	−2.11%
1999	49	−3.89%
2007	59	+2.35%
2012	67	+2.58%
2017	72	+1.45%
2023	65	−1.69%
Source: INSEE

== See also ==
- Communes of the Alpes-Maritimes department
