= Le Tignet =

Commune in Provence-Alpes-Côte d'Azur, France

- Commune
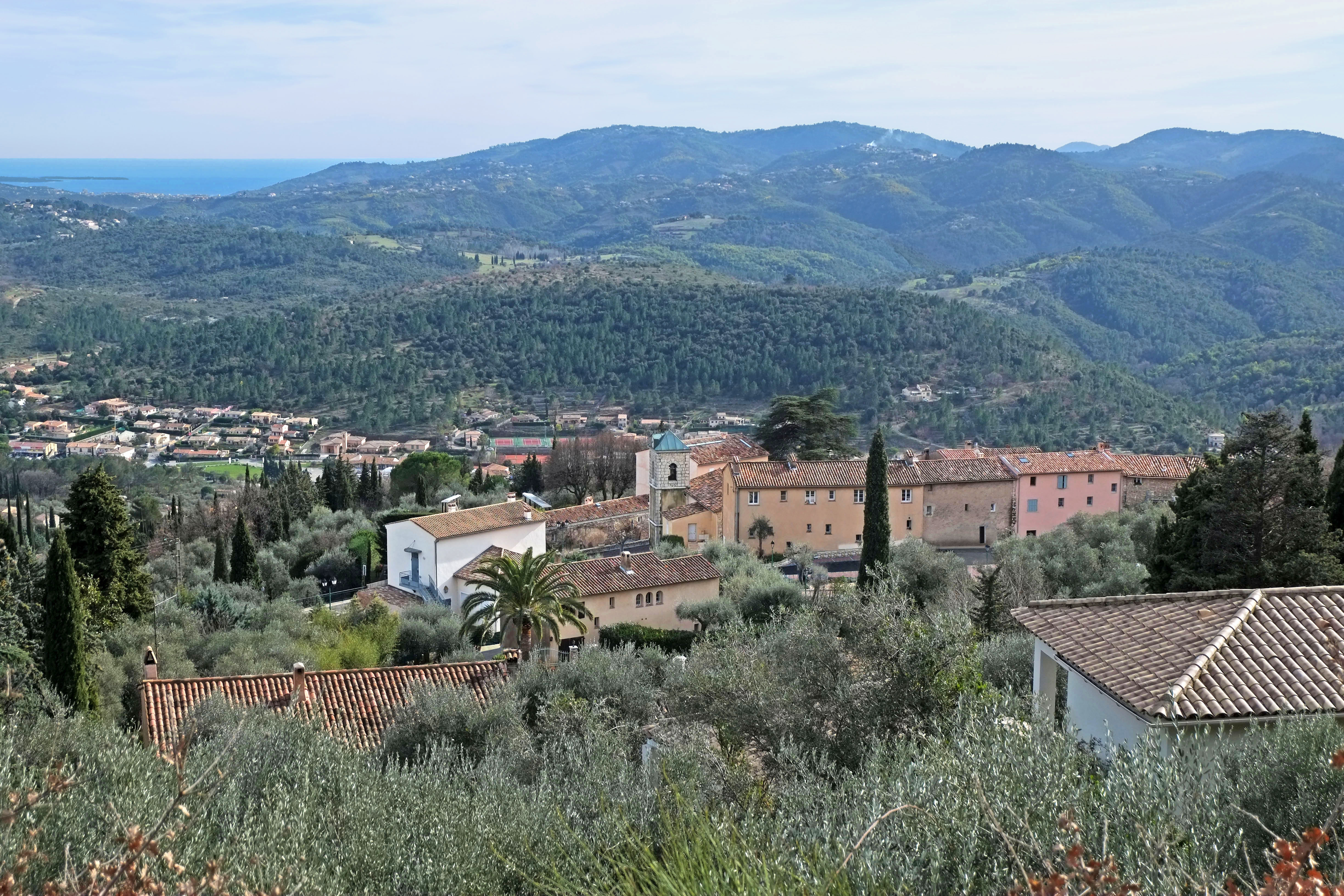
- A view of the village of Le Tignet from a property on the path of Léouvière

- Coat of arms
- Location of Le Tignet
- Location within France Location within Provence-Alpes-Côte d'Azur
- Coordinates: 43°38′29″N 6°50′47″E
- Country: France
- Region: Provence-Alpes-Côte d'Azur
- Department: Alpes-Maritimes
- Arrondissement: Grasse
- Canton: Grasse-1
- Intercommunality: CA Pays de Grasse

Government
  - Mayor (2026–32): Claude Serra
- Area^{1}: 11.26 km^{2} (4.35 sq mi)
- Elevation: 325 m (1,066 ft)
- Highest elevation: 600 m (2,000 ft)
- Lowest elevation: 30 m (98 ft)
- Population (2023): 3,212
  - Density: 285.3/km^{2} (738.8/sq mi)
- Time zone: UTC+01:00 (CET)
  - Summer (DST): UTC+02:00 (CEST)
- INSEE/Postal code: 06140 /06530
- ^{1} French Land Register data, which excludes lakes, ponds, glaciers > 1 km^{2} (0.386 sq mi or 247 acres) and river estuaries.

Le Tignet (French pronunciation: [lə tiɲɛ]; Occitan: Lo Tinhet) is a commune in the Alpes-Maritimes department in the Provence-Alpes-Côte d'Azur region of south-eastern France.

== Population ==
The inhabitants of the commune are known as Tignétans in French.

Historical population
| Year | Pop. | ±% p.a. |
|---|---|---|
| 1968 | 397 | — |
| 1975 | 643 | +7.13% |
| 1982 | 1,123 | +8.29% |
| 1990 | 1,945 | +7.11% |
| 1999 | 2,763 | +3.98% |
| 2007 | 3,062 | +1.29% |
| 2012 | 3,225 | +1.04% |
| 2017 | 3,146 | −0.49% |
| 2023 | 3,212 | +0.35% |
Source: INSEE

== See also ==
- Communes of the Alpes-Maritimes department
