= La Roquette-sur-Siagne =

Commune in Provence-Alpes-Côte d'Azur, France

- Commune
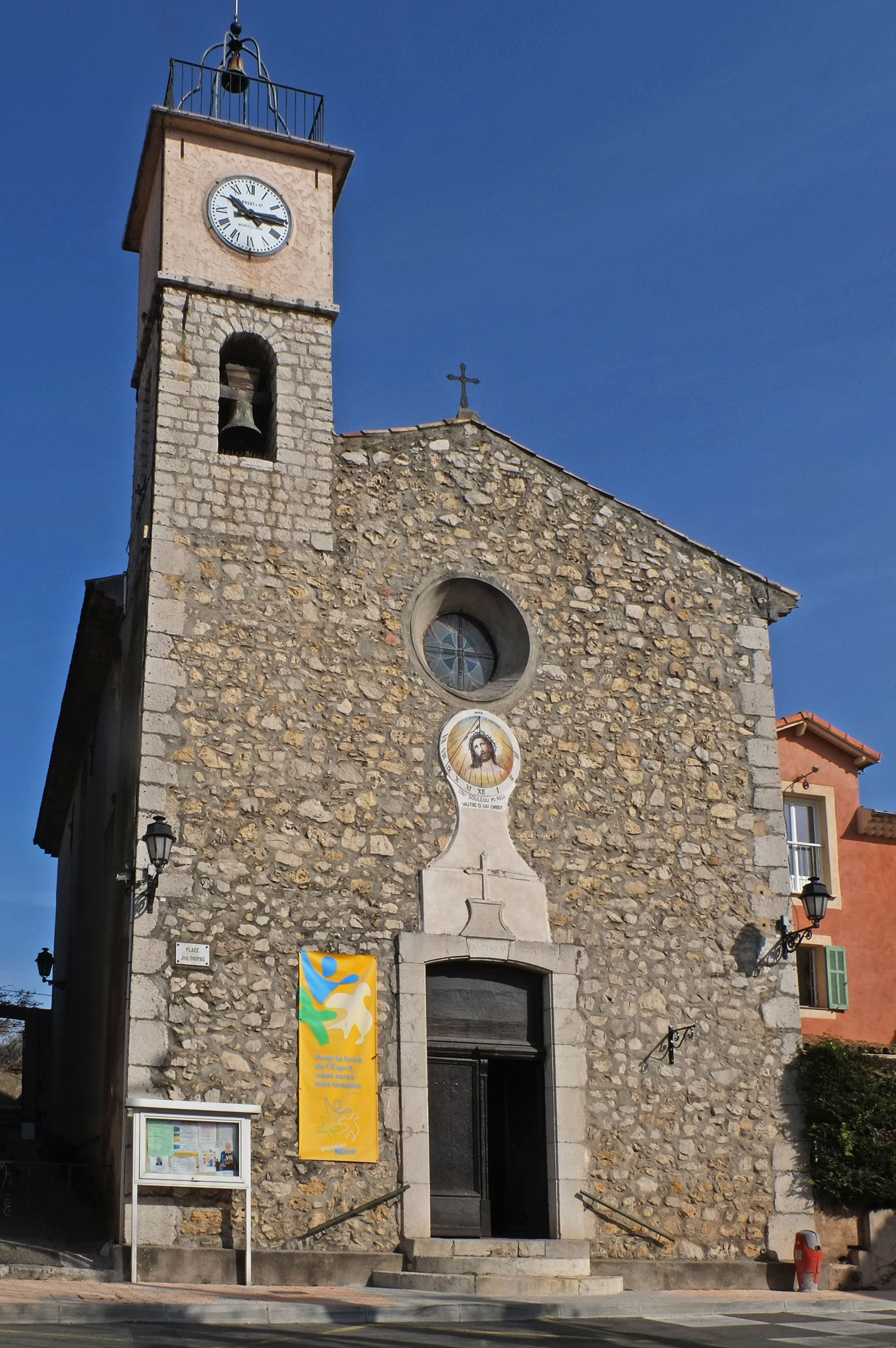
- The church of La Roquette-sur-Siagne

- Coat of arms
- Location of La Roquette-sur-Siagne
- Location within France Location within Provence-Alpes-Côte d'Azur
- Coordinates: 43°34′51″N 6°57′22″E
- Country: France
- Region: Provence-Alpes-Côte d'Azur
- Department: Alpes-Maritimes
- Arrondissement: Grasse
- Canton: Mandelieu-la-Napoule
- Intercommunality: CA Pays de Grasse

Government
  - Mayor (2026–32): Clément Thiery
- Area^{1}: 6.31 km^{2} (2.44 sq mi)
- Elevation: 148 m (486 ft)
- Highest elevation: 170 m (560 ft)
- Lowest elevation: 6 m (20 ft)
- Population (2023): 5,669
  - Density: 898/km^{2} (2,330/sq mi)
- Demonym: Roquettans
- Time zone: UTC+01:00 (CET)
  - Summer (DST): UTC+02:00 (CEST)
- INSEE/Postal code: 06108 /06550
- ^{1} French Land Register data, which excludes lakes, ponds, glaciers > 1 km^{2} (0.386 sq mi or 247 acres) and river estuaries.

La Roquette-sur-Siagne (French pronunciation: [la ʁɔkɛt syʁ sjaɲ], literally La Roquette on Siagne; Occitan: La Roqueta de Sianha) is a commune in the Alpes-Maritimes department in southeastern France.

== Population ==
Historical population
Year	Pop.	±% p.a.
1968	1,670	—
1975	2,006	+2.65%
1982	2,554	+3.51%
1990	3,642	+4.54%
1999	4,445	+2.24%
2007	4,920	+1.28%
2012	5,243	+1.28%
2017	5,390	+0.55%
2023	5,669	+0.84%
Source: INSEE

== See also ==
- Communes of the Alpes-Maritimes department
