= Briançonnet =

Commune in Provence-Alpes-Côte d'Azur, France

- Commune
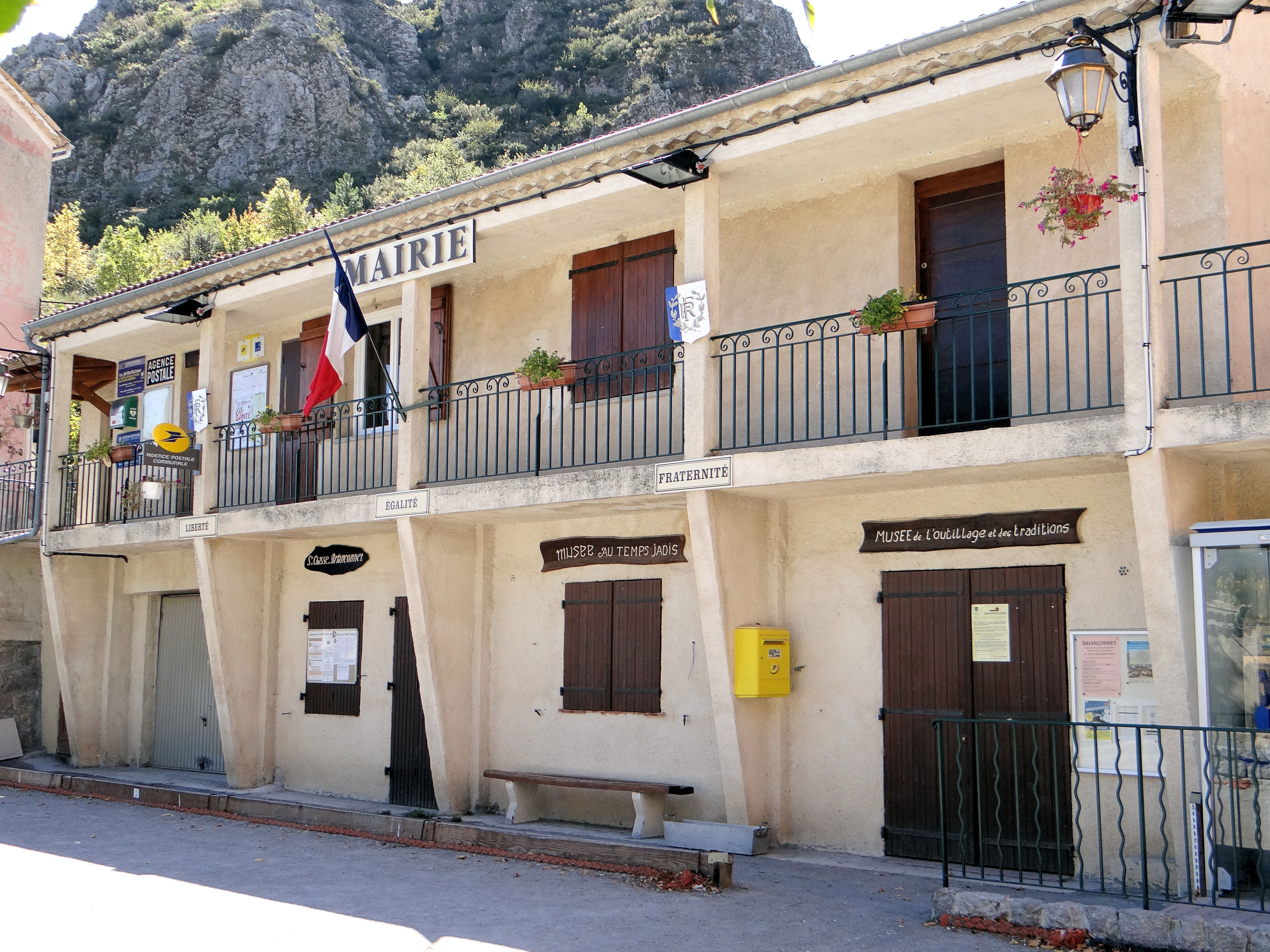
- The town hall and the Tool Museum

- Coat of arms
- Location of Briançonnet
- Location within France Location within Provence-Alpes-Côte d'Azur
- Coordinates: 43°51′58″N 6°45′30″E
- Country: France
- Region: Provence-Alpes-Côte d'Azur
- Department: Alpes-Maritimes
- Arrondissement: Grasse
- Canton: Grasse-1
- Intercommunality: CA Pays de Grasse

Government
  - Mayor (2026–32): Ismaël Ogez
- Area^{1}: 24.32 km^{2} (9.39 sq mi)
- Elevation: 1,010 m (3,310 ft)
- Highest elevation: 1,600 m (5,200 ft)
- Lowest elevation: 740 m (2,430 ft)
- Population (2023): 165
  - Density: 6.78/km^{2} (17.6/sq mi)
- Demonym: Briançonnois
- Time zone: UTC+01:00 (CET)
  - Summer (DST): UTC+02:00 (CEST)
- INSEE/Postal code: 06024 /06850
- ^{1} French Land Register data, which excludes lakes, ponds, glaciers > 1 km^{2} (0.386 sq mi or 247 acres) and river estuaries.

Briançonnet (French pronunciation: [bʁijɑ̃sɔnɛ]; Occitan: Briançonet) is a commune in the Alpes-Maritimes department in southeastern France.

== Population ==
Historical population
Year	Pop.	±% p.a.
1968	158	—
1975	193	+2.90%
1982	184	−0.68%
1990	190	+0.40%
1999	170	−1.23%
2007	192	+1.53%
2012	234	+4.04%
2017	221	−1.14%
2023	165	−4.75%
Source: INSEE

== See also ==
- Communes of the Alpes-Maritimes department
