= Conségudes =

Commune in Provence-Alpes-Côte d'Azur, France

- Commune
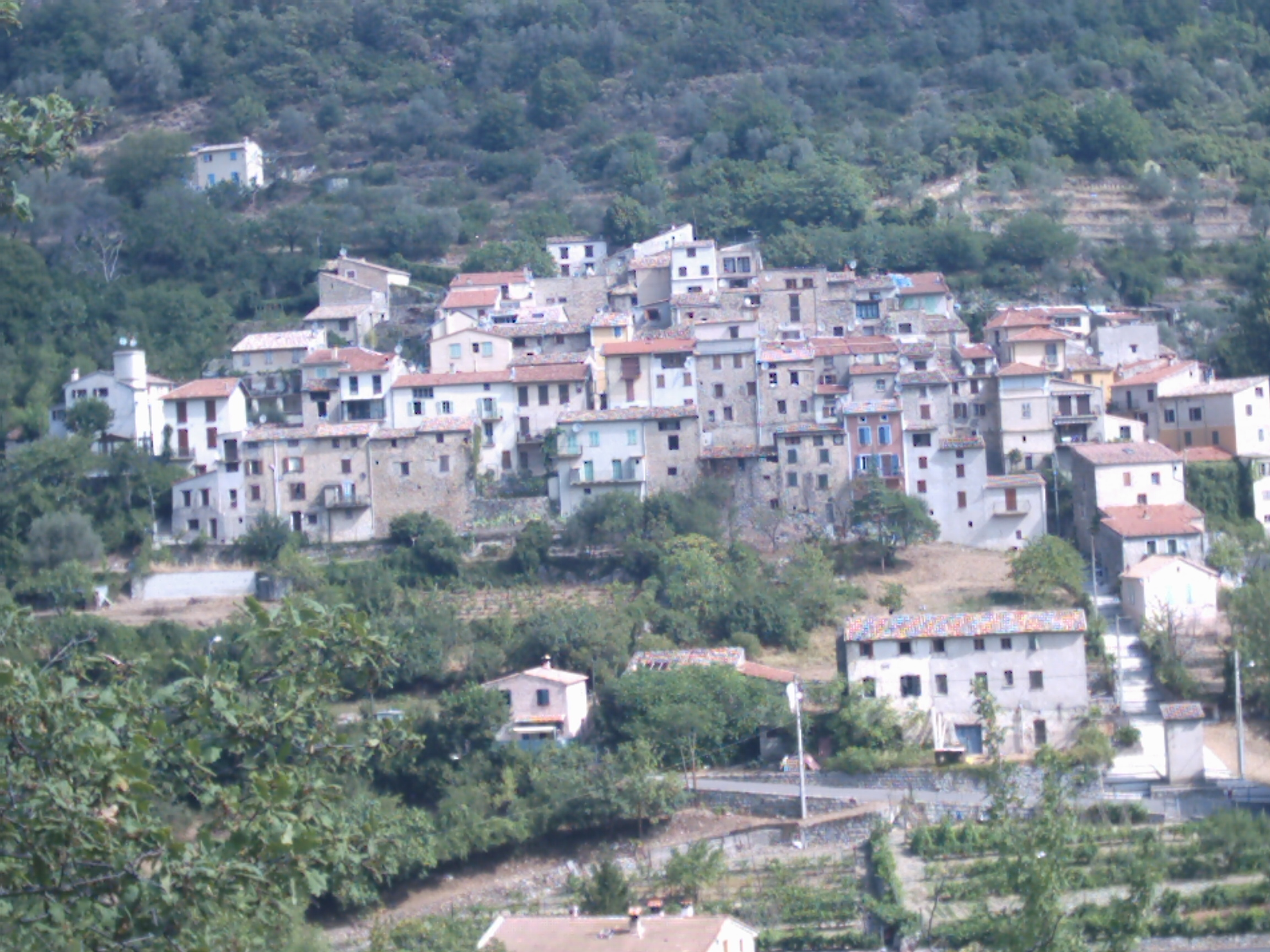
- A general view of Conségudes

- Coat of arms
- Location of Conségudes
- Location within France Location within Provence-Alpes-Côte d'Azur
- Coordinates: 43°50′39″N 7°02′57″E
- Country: France
- Region: Provence-Alpes-Côte d'Azur
- Department: Alpes-Maritimes
- Arrondissement: Grasse
- Canton: Vence
- Intercommunality: CA Sophia Antipolis

Government
  - Mayor (2026–32): Andréa Orabona
- Area^{1}: 12.47 km^{2} (4.81 sq mi)
- Highest elevation: 1,464 m (4,803 ft)
- Lowest elevation: 256 m (840 ft)
- Population (2023): 103
  - Density: 8.26/km^{2} (21.4/sq mi)
- Time zone: UTC+01:00 (CET)
  - Summer (DST): UTC+02:00 (CEST)
- INSEE/Postal code: 06047 /06510
- ^{1} French Land Register data, which excludes lakes, ponds, glaciers > 1 km^{2} (0.386 sq mi or 247 acres) and river estuaries.

Conségudes (French pronunciation: [kɔ̃seɡyd]; Occitan: Consegudas) is a commune in the Alpes-Maritimes department in southeastern France.

== Population ==
Historical population
Year	Pop.	±% p.a.
1968	91	—
1975	64	−4.90%
1982	59	−1.16%
1990	57	−0.43%
1999	63	+1.12%
2007	79	+2.87%
2012	93	+3.32%
2017	99	+1.26%
2023	103	+0.66%
Source: INSEE

== See also ==
- Communes of the Alpes-Maritimes department
