= Les Mujouls =

Commune in Provence-Alpes-Côte d'Azur, France

- Commune
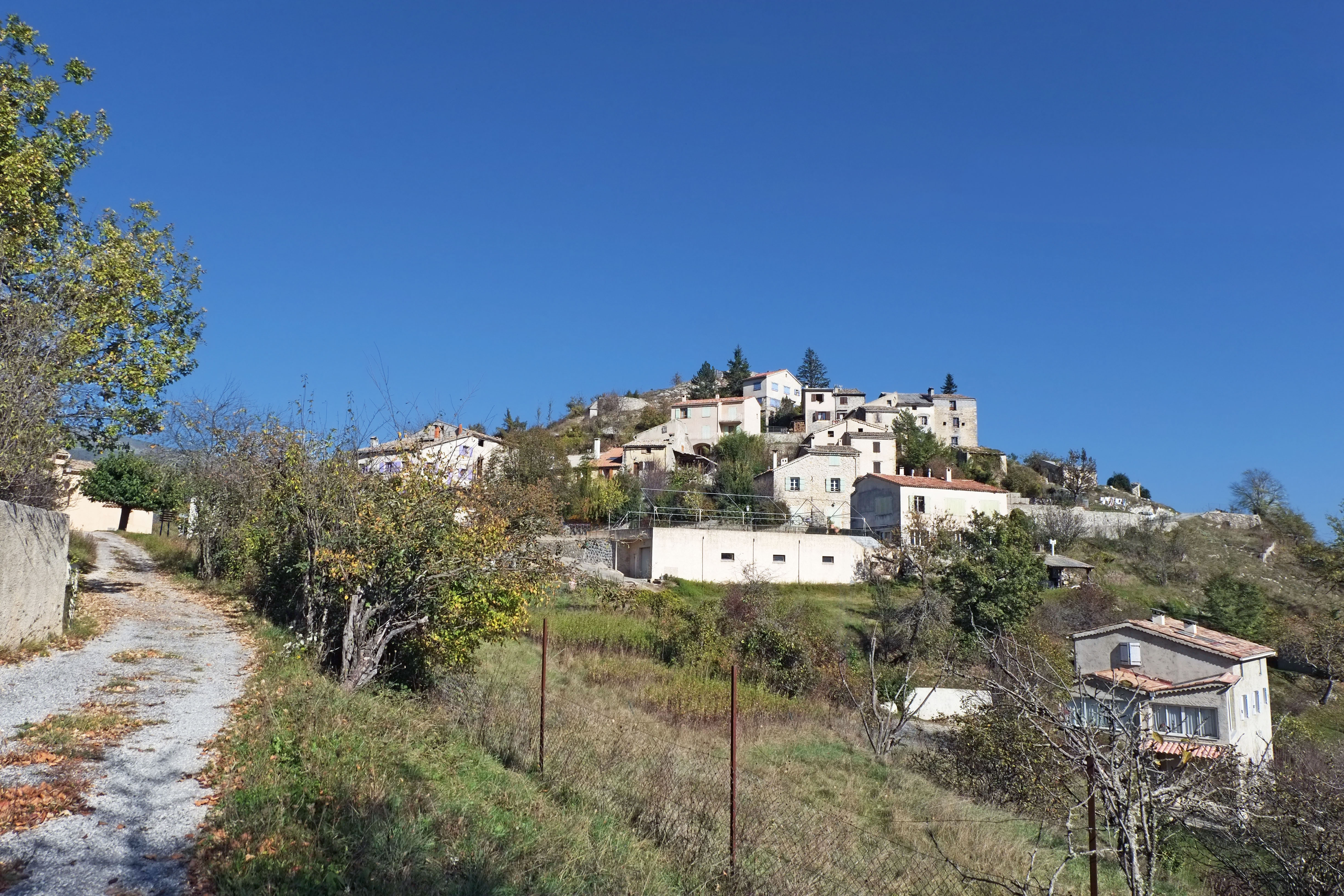
- A view from the north of the village

- Coat of arms
- Location of Les Mujouls
- Location within France Location within Provence-Alpes-Côte d'Azur
- Coordinates: 43°53′05″N 6°51′38″E
- Country: France
- Region: Provence-Alpes-Côte d'Azur
- Department: Alpes-Maritimes
- Arrondissement: Grasse
- Canton: Grasse-1
- Intercommunality: CA Pays de Grasse

Government
  - Mayor (2026–32): Gérard Bouchard
- Area^{1}: 14.55 km^{2} (5.62 sq mi)
- Elevation: 750 m (2,460 ft)
- Highest elevation: 1,416 m (4,646 ft)
- Lowest elevation: 518 m (1,699 ft)
- Population (2023): 37
  - Density: 2.5/km^{2} (6.6/sq mi)
- Time zone: UTC+01:00 (CET)
  - Summer (DST): UTC+02:00 (CEST)
- INSEE/Postal code: 06087 /06910
- ^{1} French Land Register data, which excludes lakes, ponds, glaciers > 1 km^{2} (0.386 sq mi or 247 acres) and river estuaries.

Les Mujouls (French pronunciation: [le myʒul]; Occitan: Lei Mújols; Italian: Moggioli) is a commune in the Alpes-Maritimes department in southeastern France.

== Population ==
Historical population
Year	Pop.	±% p.a.
1968	25	—
1975	25	+0.00%
1982	27	+1.11%
1990	27	+0.00%
1999	30	+1.18%
2007	59	+8.82%
2012	41	−7.02%
2017	51	+4.46%
2023	37	−5.21%
Source: INSEE

== See also ==
- Communes of the Alpes-Maritimes department
