= La Roque-en-Provence =

Commune in Provence-Alpes-Côte d'Azur, France

- Commune
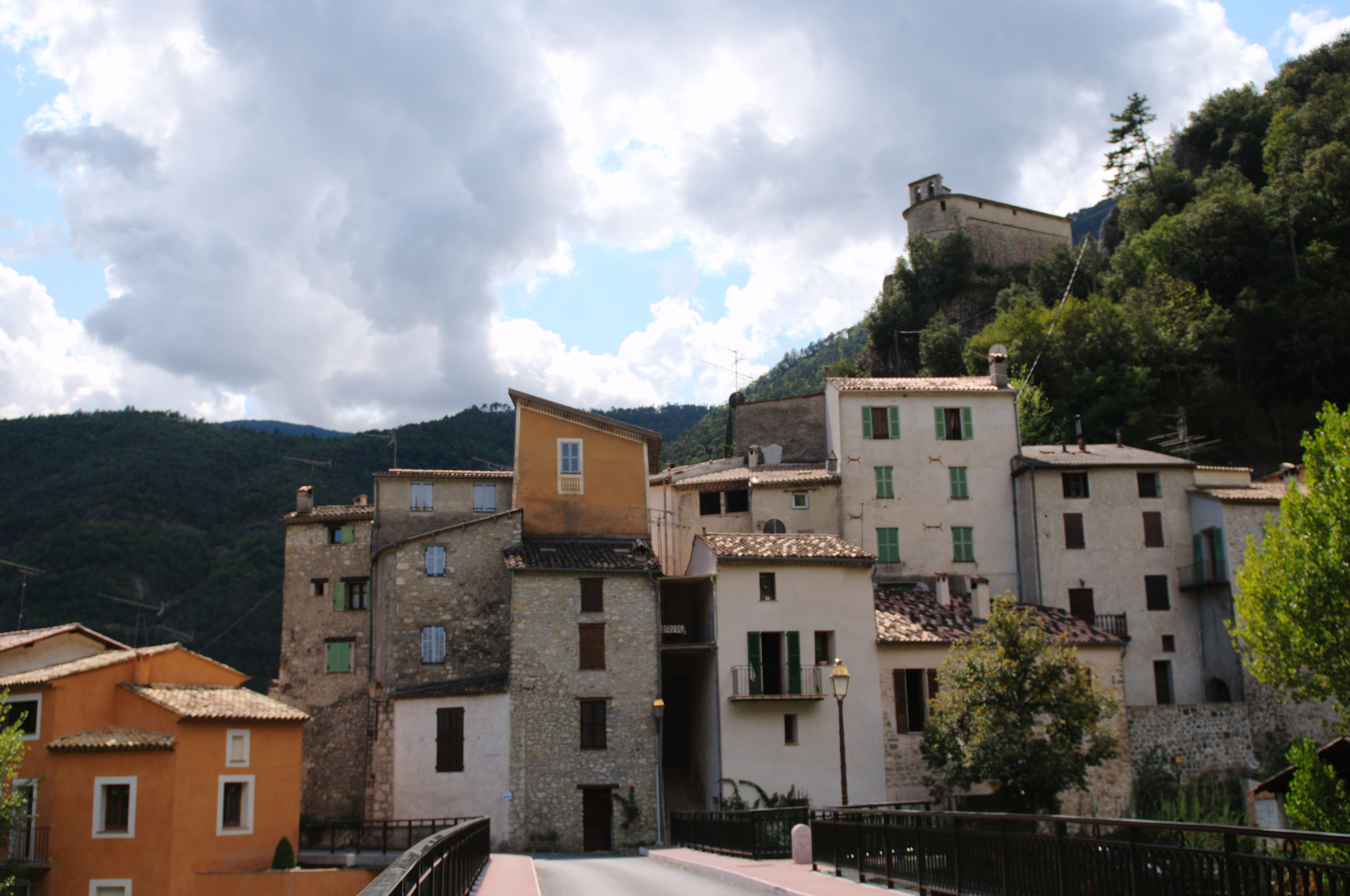
- La Roque-en-Provence with the church of Sainte-Pétronille

- Coat of arms
- Location of La Roque-en-Provence
- Location within France Location within Provence-Alpes-Côte d'Azur
- Coordinates: 43°52′18″N 7°00′20″E
- Country: France
- Region: Provence-Alpes-Côte d'Azur
- Department: Alpes-Maritimes
- Arrondissement: Grasse
- Canton: Vence
- Intercommunality: CA Sophia Antipolis

Government
  - Mayor (2026–32): Alexis Argenti
- Area^{1}: 23.98 km^{2} (9.26 sq mi)
- Elevation: 340 m (1,120 ft)
- Highest elevation: 1,565 m (5,135 ft)
- Lowest elevation: 289 m (948 ft)
- Population (2023): 67
  - Density: 2.8/km^{2} (7.2/sq mi)
- Demonym: Roquerois
- Time zone: UTC+01:00 (CET)
  - Summer (DST): UTC+02:00 (CEST)
- INSEE/Postal code: 06107 /06910
- ^{1} French Land Register data, which excludes lakes, ponds, glaciers > 1 km^{2} (0.386 sq mi or 247 acres) and river estuaries.

La Roque-en-Provence (French pronunciation: [la ʁɔk ɑ̃ pʁɔvɑ̃s], literally La Roque in Provence; before 2015: Roquestéron-Grasse) is a commune in the Alpes-Maritimes department in southeastern France.

== Demographics ==
Historical population
| Year | Pop. | ±% p.a. |
|---|---|---|
| 1968 | 40 | — |
| 1975 | 56 | +4.92% |
| 1982 | 59 | +0.75% |
| 1990 | 59 | +0.00% |
| 1999 | 65 | +1.08% |
| 2007 | 63 | −0.39% |
| 2012 | 81 | +5.15% |
| 2017 | 77 | −1.01% |
| 2023 | 67 | −2.29% |
Source: INSEE

== See also ==
- Communes of the Alpes-Maritimes department
