= Valderoure =

Commune in Provence-Alpes-Côte d'Azur, France

- Commune
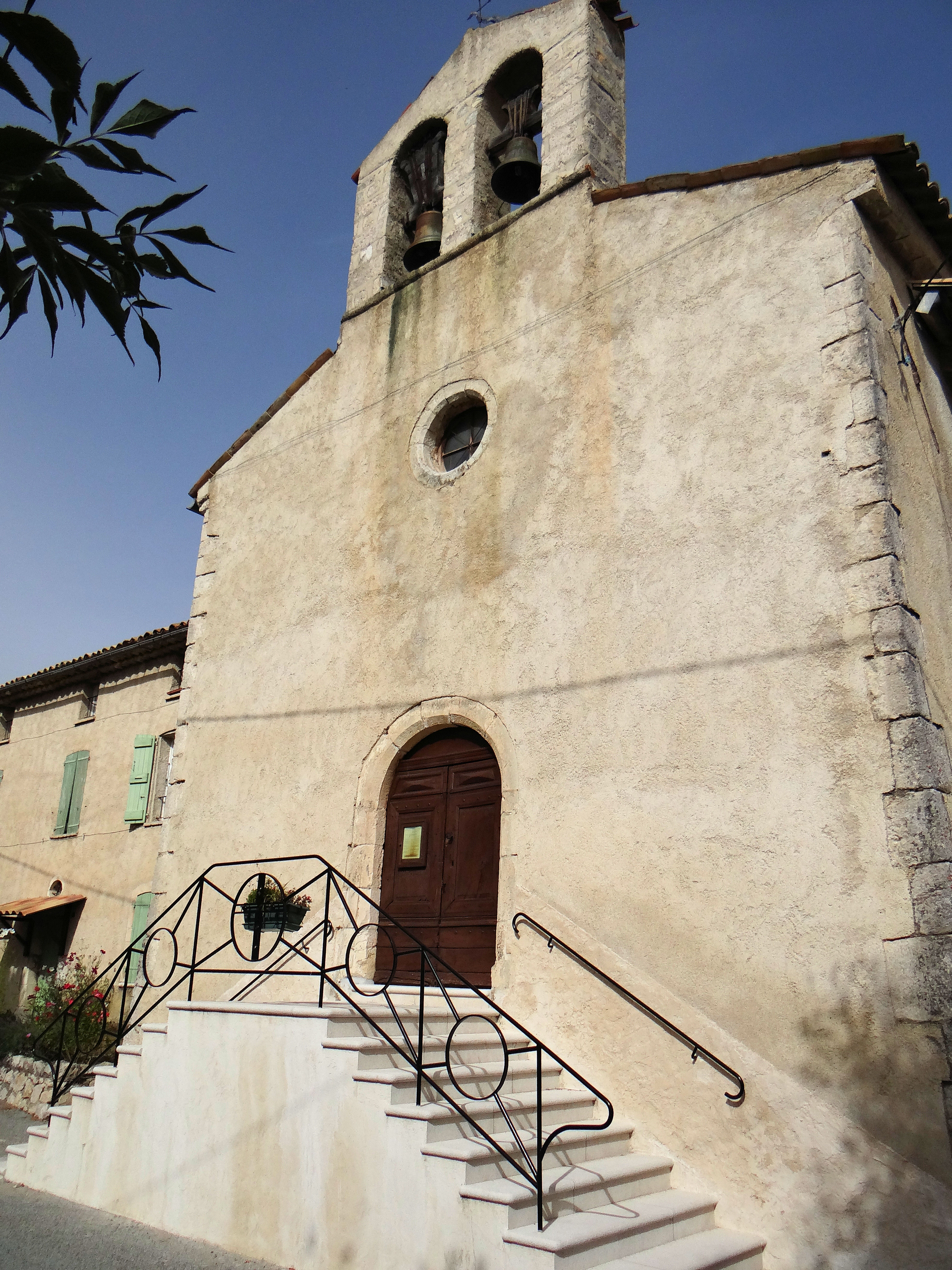
- The church of Our Lady of the Assumption and Saint-Roch

- Coat of arms
- Location of Valderoure
- Location within France Location within Provence-Alpes-Côte d'Azur
- Coordinates: 43°47′51″N 6°42′39″E
- Country: France
- Region: Provence-Alpes-Côte d'Azur
- Department: Alpes-Maritimes
- Arrondissement: Grasse
- Canton: Grasse-1
- Intercommunality: CA Pays de Grasse

Government
  - Mayor (2026–32): Sandrine Giraud
- Area^{1}: 25.34 km^{2} (9.78 sq mi)
- Elevation: 1,050 m (3,440 ft)
- Highest elevation: 1,645 m (5,397 ft)
- Lowest elevation: 1,027 m (3,369 ft)
- Population (2023): 539
  - Density: 21.3/km^{2} (55.1/sq mi)
- Time zone: UTC+01:00 (CET)
  - Summer (DST): UTC+02:00 (CEST)
- INSEE/Postal code: 06154 /06750
- ^{1} French Land Register data, which excludes lakes, ponds, glaciers > 1 km^{2} (0.386 sq mi or 247 acres) and river estuaries.

Valderoure (French pronunciation: [valdəʁuʁ]; Occitan: Vauderore) is a commune in the Alpes-Maritimes department in the Provence-Alpes-Côte d'Azur region in southeastern France.

== Population ==
Historical population
| Year | Pop. | ±% p.a. |
|---|---|---|
| 1968 | 132 | — |
| 1975 | 110 | −2.57% |
| 1982 | 167 | +6.15% |
| 1990 | 178 | +0.80% |
| 1999 | 306 | +6.20% |
| 2007 | 384 | +2.88% |
| 2012 | 421 | +1.86% |
| 2017 | 452 | +1.43% |
| 2023 | 539 | +2.98% |
Source: INSEE

== See also ==
Communes of the Alpes-Maritimes department
