= Saint-Auban =

Commune in Provence-Alpes-Côte d'Azur, France

- Commune
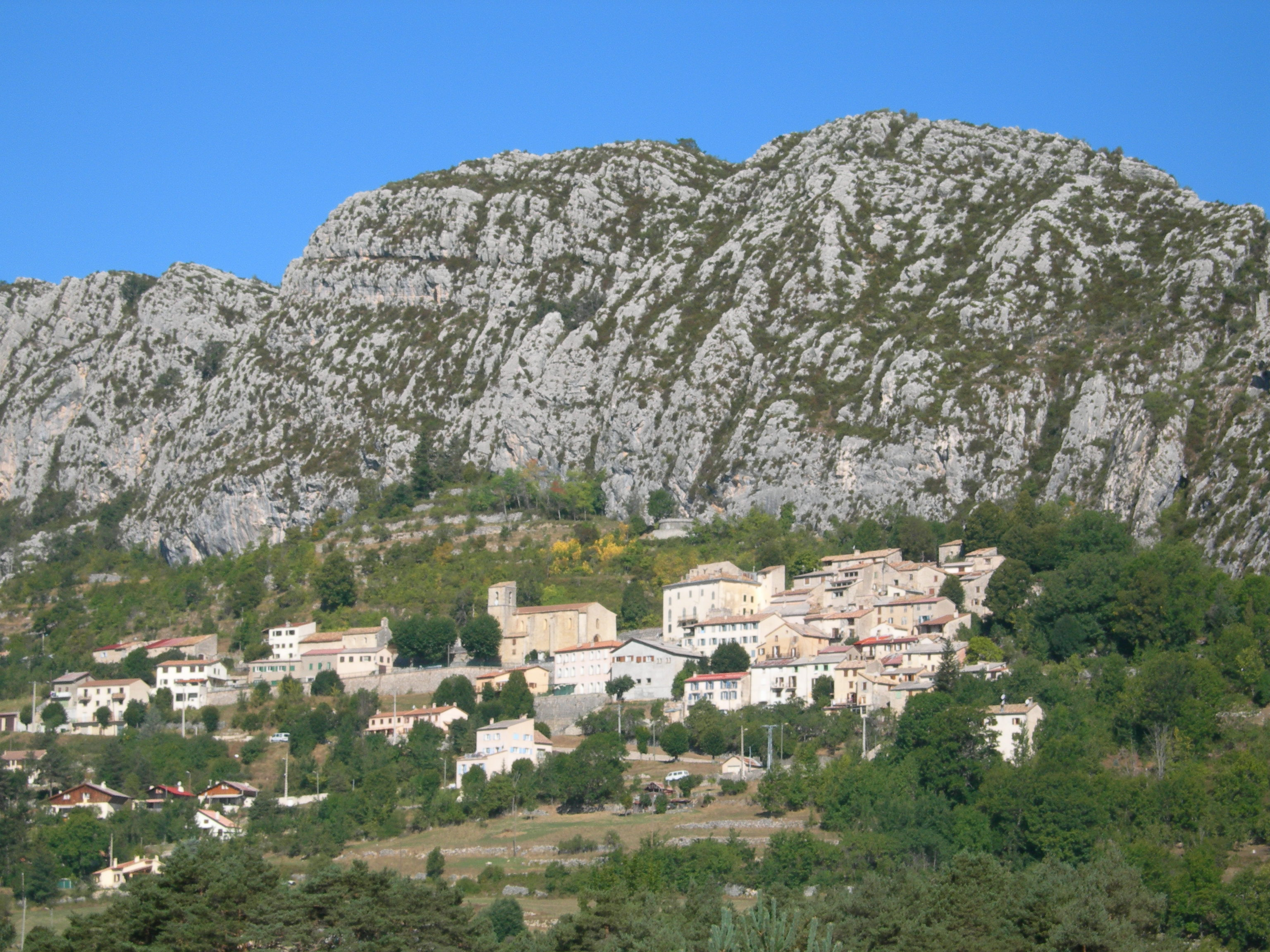
- A general view of the village

- Coat of arms
- Location of Saint-Auban
- Location within France Location within Provence-Alpes-Côte d'Azur
- Coordinates: 43°50′57″N 6°43′38″E
- Country: France
- Region: Provence-Alpes-Côte d'Azur
- Department: Alpes-Maritimes
- Arrondissement: Grasse
- Canton: Grasse-1
- Intercommunality: CA Pays de Grasse

Government
  - Mayor (2026–32): Hervé Georges Romano
- Area^{1}: 42.54 km^{2} (16.42 sq mi)
- Elevation: 1,150 m (3,770 ft)
- Highest elevation: 1,689 m (5,541 ft)
- Lowest elevation: 899 m (2,949 ft)
- Population (2023): 194
  - Density: 4.56/km^{2} (11.8/sq mi)
- Time zone: UTC+01:00 (CET)
  - Summer (DST): UTC+02:00 (CEST)
- INSEE/Postal code: 06116 /06850
- ^{1} French Land Register data, which excludes lakes, ponds, glaciers > 1 km^{2} (0.386 sq mi or 247 acres) and river estuaries.

Saint-Auban (French pronunciation: [sɛ̃.t‿obɑ̃]; Occitan: Sant Auban; Italian: Sant'Albano sull'Esterone) is a commune in the Alpes-Maritimes department in southeastern France.

== Population ==
Historical population
Year	Pop.	±% p.a.
1968	211	—
1975	225	+0.92%
1982	221	−0.26%
1990	217	−0.23%
1999	267	+2.33%
2007	226	−2.06%
2012	228	+0.18%
2017	222	−0.53%
2023	194	−2.22%
Source: INSEE

== Climate ==
On average, Saint-Auban experiences 88.9 days per year with a minimum temperature below 0 °C (32.0 °F), 3.7 days per year with a minimum temperature below −10 °C (14.0 °F), 1.5 days per year with a maximum temperature below 0 °C (32.0 °F), and 30.1 days per year with a maximum temperature above 30 °C (86.0 °F). The record high temperature was 39.0 °C (102.2 °F) on 28 June 2019, while the record low temperature was −17.1 °C (1.2 °F) on 5 February 2012.

Climate data for Saint-Auban (1991–2020 normals, extremes 2002–present)
Month	Jan	Feb	Mar	Apr	May	Jun	Jul	Aug	Sep	Oct	Nov	Dec	Year
Record high °C (°F)	21.4 (70.5)	22.5 (72.5)	23.8 (74.8)	28.0 (82.4)	32.2 (90.0)	39.0 (102.2)	36.7 (98.1)	37.9 (100.2)	32.3 (90.1)	28.7 (83.7)	22.4 (72.3)	19.4 (66.9)	39.0 (102.2)
Mean daily maximum °C (°F)	8.9 (48.0)	9.8 (49.6)	13.4 (56.1)	17.2 (63.0)	20.7 (69.3)	25.7 (78.3)	28.5 (83.3)	27.9 (82.2)	23.5 (74.3)	18.7 (65.7)	13.1 (55.6)	9.6 (49.3)	18.1 (64.6)
Daily mean °C (°F)	3.6 (38.5)	3.8 (38.8)	7.0 (44.6)	10.5 (50.9)	13.9 (57.0)	18.2 (64.8)	20.6 (69.1)	20.1 (68.2)	16.4 (61.5)	12.6 (54.7)	7.7 (45.9)	4.3 (39.7)	11.6 (52.8)
Mean daily minimum °C (°F)	−1.8 (28.8)	−2.2 (28.0)	0.5 (32.9)	3.8 (38.8)	7.1 (44.8)	10.8 (51.4)	12.6 (54.7)	12.3 (54.1)	9.3 (48.7)	6.5 (43.7)	2.3 (36.1)	−1.0 (30.2)	5.0 (41.0)
Record low °C (°F)	−14.0 (6.8)	−17.1 (1.2)	−13.1 (8.4)	−5.9 (21.4)	−2.0 (28.4)	0.5 (32.9)	5.2 (41.4)	3.9 (39.0)	0.2 (32.4)	−5.4 (22.3)	−10.5 (13.1)	−15.4 (4.3)	−17.1 (1.2)
Average precipitation mm (inches)	57.6 (2.27)	48.1 (1.89)	51.1 (2.01)	64.9 (2.56)	63.4 (2.50)	53.3 (2.10)	34.7 (1.37)	51.1 (2.01)	70.4 (2.77)	104.8 (4.13)	116.4 (4.58)	74.2 (2.92)	790.0 (31.10)
Average precipitation days (≥ 1.0 mm)	6.8	6.2	7.0	7.3	7.9	5.3	4.0	4.7	5.0	7.0	8.9	7.7	77.8
Source: Meteociel

== See also ==
- Communes of the Alpes-Maritimes department
