= Canton of Antibes-Centre =

Coordinates: 43°34′51″N 7°07′26″E

Antibes-Centre
- Former canton
- Interactive map of Antibes-Centre
- Country: France
- Region: Provence-Alpes-Côte d'Azur
- Department: Alpes-Maritimes
- No. of communes: {{{nbcomm}}}
- Disbanded: 2015
- Population (2012): 28,964

The canton of Antibes-Centre is a former administrative division in southeastern France. It was disbanded following the French canton reorganisation which came into effect in March 2015. It had 28,964 inhabitants (2012). It comprised part of the commune of Antibes.

== Demographics ==
Historical population
Year	Pop.	±%
1999	28,502	—
2012	28,964	+1.6%

== See also ==
- Cantons of the Alpes-Maritimes department
