= Cabris =

Commune in Provence-Alpes-Côte d'Azur, France

- Commune
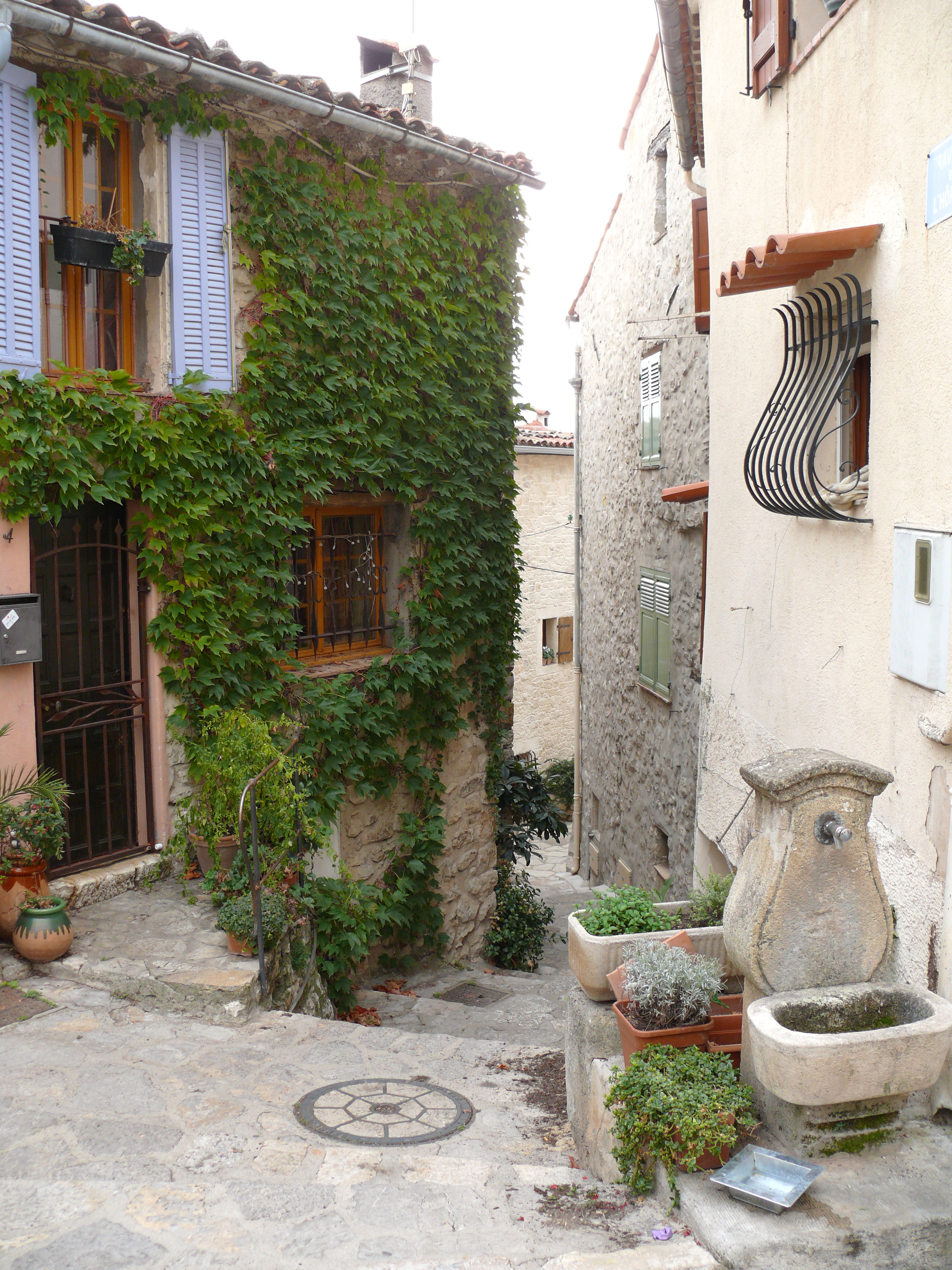
- Alley in the village of Cabris

- Coat of arms
- Location of Cabris
- Location within France Location within Provence-Alpes-Côte d'Azur
- Coordinates: 43°39′25″N 6°52′28″E
- Country: France
- Region: Provence-Alpes-Côte d'Azur
- Department: Alpes-Maritimes
- Arrondissement: Grasse
- Canton: Grasse-1
- Intercommunality: CA Pays de Grasse

Government
  - Mayor (2026–32): Dominique Condo
- Area^{1}: 5.43 km^{2} (2.10 sq mi)
- Elevation: 550 m (1,800 ft)
- Highest elevation: 762 m (2,500 ft)
- Lowest elevation: 240 m (790 ft)
- Population (2023): 1,450
  - Density: 267/km^{2} (692/sq mi)
- Time zone: UTC+01:00 (CET)
  - Summer (DST): UTC+02:00 (CEST)
- INSEE/Postal code: 06026 /06530
- ^{1} French Land Register data, which excludes lakes, ponds, glaciers > 1 km^{2} (0.386 sq mi or 247 acres) and river estuaries.

Cabris (French pronunciation: [kabʁis]; Occitan: Cabras; Italian: Cabri, formerly) is a commune in the Alpes-Maritimes department in the Provence-Alpes-Côte d'Azur region in Southeastern France. The commune, just east of Grasse, is part of Préalpes d'Azur Regional Natural Park. The village of Cabris is a village perché; its parish church Notre-Dame de l'Assomption dates back to 1630.

== Demographics ==
Historical population
Year	Pop.	±% p.a.
1968	658	—
1975	770	+2.27%
1982	1,131	+5.65%
1990	1,307	+1.82%
1999	1,472	+1.33%
2007	1,507	+0.29%
2012	1,384	−1.69%
2017	1,324	−0.88%
2023	1,450	+1.53%
Source: INSEE

== See also ==
- Communes of the Alpes-Maritimes department
