= Collongues, Alpes-Maritimes =

Commune in Provence-Alpes-Côte d'Azur, France

Collongues
- Commune
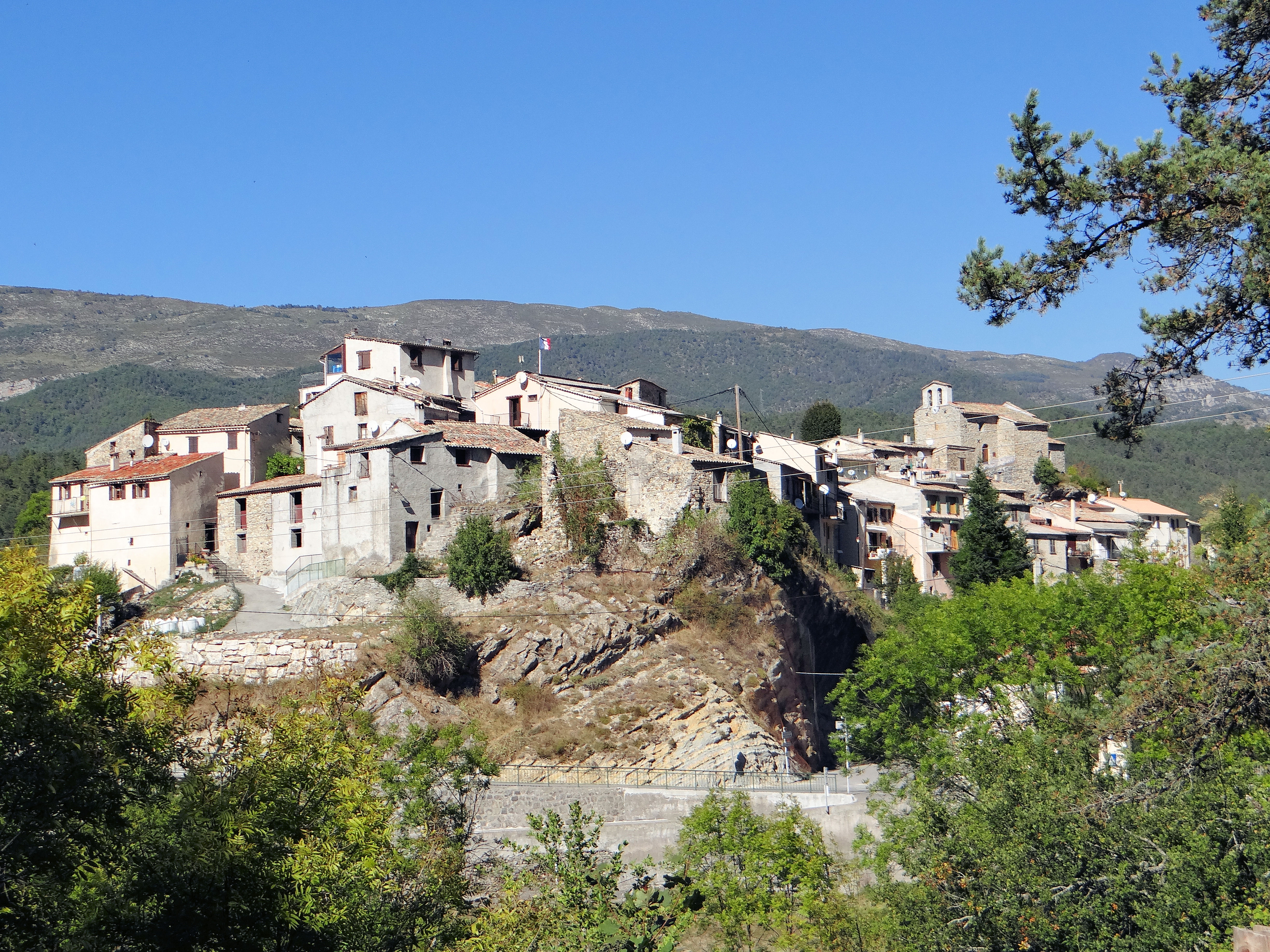
- A general view of the village of Collongues

- Coat of arms
- Location of Collongues
- Location within France Location within Provence-Alpes-Côte d'Azur
- Coordinates: 43°53′19″N 6°51′50″E
- Country: France
- Region: Provence-Alpes-Côte d'Azur
- Department: Alpes-Maritimes
- Arrondissement: Grasse
- Canton: Grasse-1
- Intercommunality: CA Pays de Grasse

Government
  - Mayor (2026–32): Raoul Castel
- Area^{1}: 10.78 km^{2} (4.16 sq mi)
- Elevation: 628 m (2,060 ft)
- Highest elevation: 1,200 m (3,900 ft)
- Lowest elevation: 574 m (1,883 ft)
- Population (2023): 84
  - Density: 7.8/km^{2} (20/sq mi)
- Time zone: UTC+01:00 (CET)
  - Summer (DST): UTC+02:00 (CEST)
- INSEE/Postal code: 06045 /06910
- ^{1} French Land Register data, which excludes lakes, ponds, glaciers > 1 km^{2} (0.386 sq mi or 247 acres) and river estuaries.

Collongues (French pronunciation: [kɔlɔ̃ɡ]; Occitan: Colongas) is a commune in the Alpes-Maritimes department in southeastern France.

== Population ==
Historical population
Year	Pop.	±% p.a.
1968	58	—
1975	65	+1.64%
1982	121	+9.28%
1990	116	−0.53%
1999	102	−1.42%
2007	101	−0.12%
2012	102	+0.20%
2017	78	−5.22%
2023	84	+1.24%
Source: INSEE

== See also ==
- Communes of the Alpes-Maritimes department
