= Communauté d'agglomération du Pays de Grasse =

Pays de Grasse
- Communauté d'agglomération
- Interactive map of Pays de Grasse
- Coordinates: 43°40′N 06°55′E
- Country: France
- Region: Provence-Alpes-Côte d'Azur
- Department: Alpes-Maritimes
- No. of communes: {{{nbcomm}}}
- Established: 2014
- Area: 489.9 km^{2} (189.2 sq mi)
- Population (2017): 101,594
  - Density: 207.4/km^{2} (537.1/sq mi)
- Website: www.paysdegrasse.fr

Communauté d'agglomération du Pays de Grasse is an intercommunal structure, centred on the city of Grasse. It is located in the Alpes-Maritimes department, in the Provence-Alpes-Côte d'Azur region, southeastern France. It was created in January 2014. Its seat is in Grasse. Its area is 489.9 km^{2}. Its population was 101,594 in 2017, of which 50,396 in Grasse proper.

== Composition ==
The communauté d'agglomération consists of the following 23 communes:

1. Amirat
2. Andon
3. Auribeau-sur-Siagne
4. Briançonnet
5. Cabris
6. Caille
7. Collongues
8. Escragnolles
9. Gars
10. Grasse
11. Le Mas
12. Mouans-Sartoux
13. Les Mujouls
14. Pégomas
15. Peymeinade
16. La Roquette-sur-Siagne
17. Saint-Auban
18. Saint-Cézaire-sur-Siagne
19. Saint-Vallier-de-Thiey
20. Séranon
21. Spéracèdes
22. Le Tignet
23. Valderoure
