= Séranon =

Commune in Provence-Alpes-Côte d'Azur, France

Séranon Seranon (Occitan)
- Commune
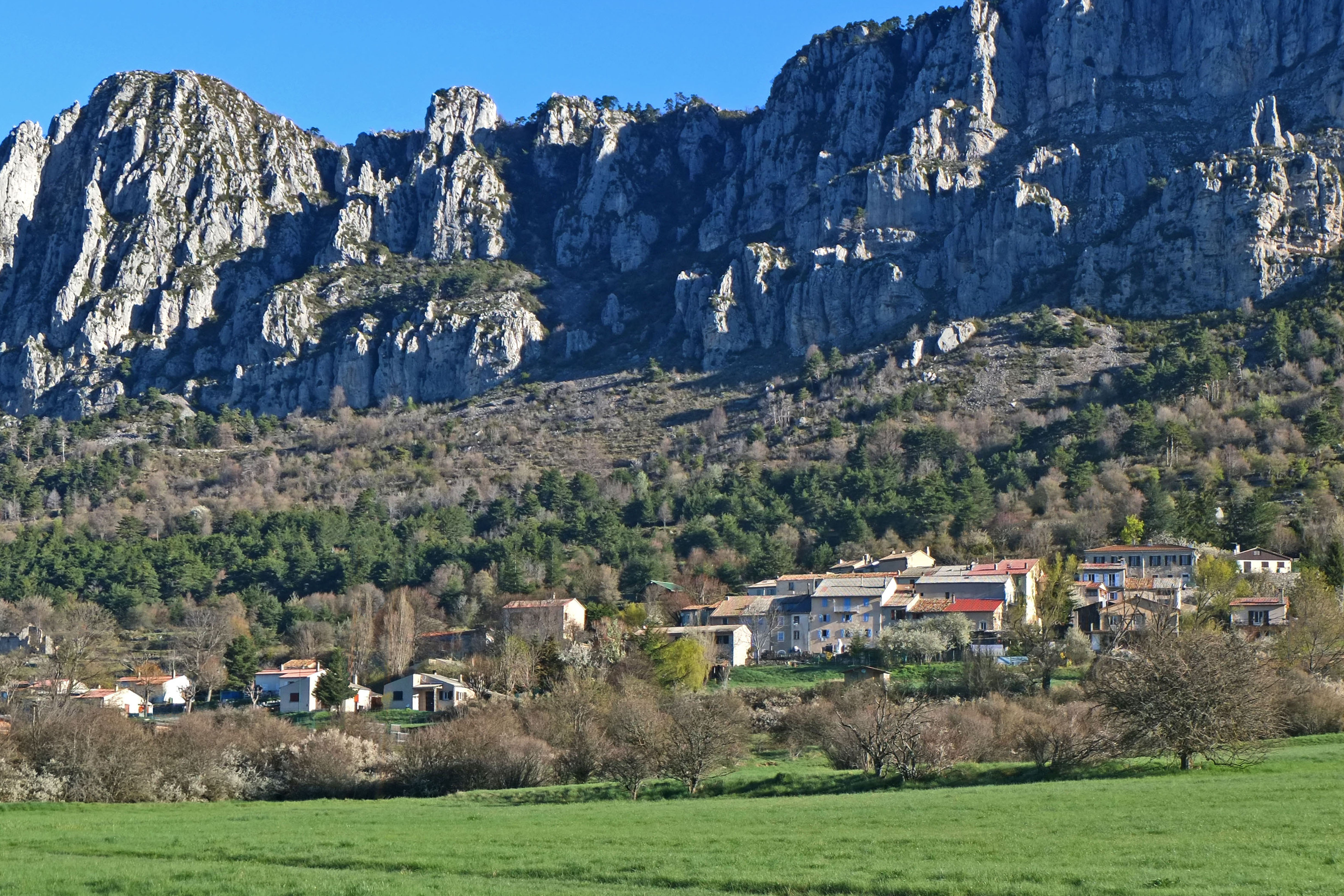
- View of the village from the Napoleon Road

- Coat of arms
- Location of Séranon
- Location within France Location within Provence-Alpes-Côte d'Azur
- Coordinates: 43°46′30″N 6°42′08″E
- Country: France
- Region: Provence-Alpes-Côte d'Azur
- Department: Alpes-Maritimes
- Arrondissement: Grasse
- Canton: Grasse-1
- Intercommunality: CA du Pays de Grasse

Government
  - Mayor (2026–32): Damien Matteoli
- Area^{1}: 23.28 km^{2} (8.99 sq mi)
- Elevation: 1,100 m (3,600 ft)
- Highest elevation: 1,712 m (5,617 ft)
- Lowest elevation: 1,018 m (3,340 ft)
- Population (2023): 540
  - Density: 23/km^{2} (60/sq mi)
- Demonym: Séranonnais
- Time zone: UTC+01:00 (CET)
  - Summer (DST): UTC+02:00 (CEST)
- INSEE/Postal code: 06134 /06750
- Website: mairiedeseranon.fr
- ^{1} French Land Register data, which excludes lakes, ponds, glaciers > 1 km^{2} (0.386 sq mi or 247 acres) and river estuaries.

Séranon (French pronunciation: [seʁanɔ̃]; Occitan: Seranon) is a rural commune in the Alpes-Maritimes department in Southeastern France. It is part of Préalpes d'Azur Regional Natural Park.

== Population ==
Historical population
Year	Pop.	±% p.a.
1968	231	—
1975	241	+0.61%
1982	272	+1.74%
1990	280	+0.36%
1999	317	+1.39%
2007	447	+4.39%
2012	482	+1.52%
2017	526	+1.76%
2023	540	+0.44%
Source: INSEE

== See also ==
- Communes of the Alpes-Maritimes department
