= Ascros =

Commune in Provence-Alpes-Côte d'Azur, France

Ascros Als Cròs (Occitan) Scroso (Italian)
- Commune
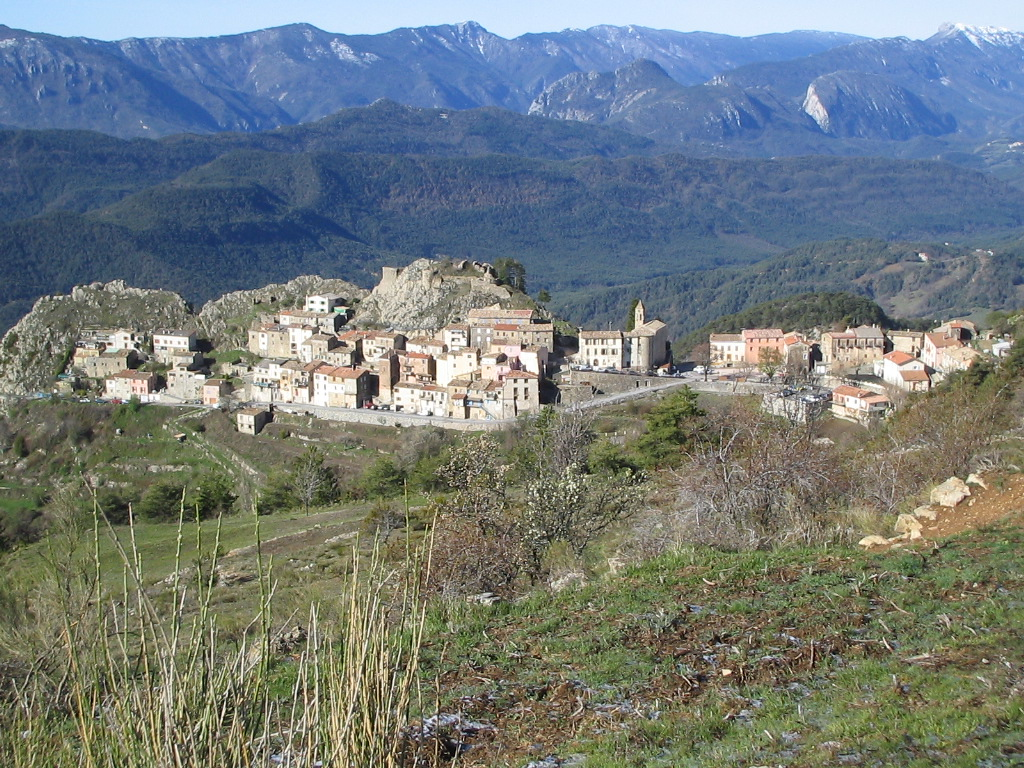
- The village of Ascros

- Coat of arms
- Location of Ascros
- Location within France Location within Provence-Alpes-Côte d'Azur
- Coordinates: 43°55′19″N 7°00′52″E
- Country: France
- Region: Provence-Alpes-Côte d'Azur
- Department: Alpes-Maritimes
- Arrondissement: Nice
- Canton: Vence
- Intercommunality: Alpes d'Azur

Government
  - Mayor (2026–32): Vincent Giobergia
- Area^{1}: 17.74 km^{2} (6.85 sq mi)
- Elevation: 1,150 m (3,770 ft)
- Highest elevation: 1,449 m (4,754 ft)
- Lowest elevation: 600 m (2,000 ft)
- Population (2023): 174
  - Density: 9.81/km^{2} (25.4/sq mi)
- Time zone: UTC+01:00 (CET)
  - Summer (DST): UTC+02:00 (CEST)
- INSEE/Postal code: 06005 /06260
- ^{1} French Land Register data, which excludes lakes, ponds, glaciers > 1 km^{2} (0.386 sq mi or 247 acres) and river estuaries.

Ascros (French pronunciation: [askʁɔs]; Occitan: Als Cròs; Italian: Scroso) is a commune in the Alpes-Maritimes department in the Provence-Alpes-Côte d'Azur region of south-eastern France.

== Geography ==
Ascros is an alpine commune located some 45 km north-west of Nice and 15 km east by south-east of Puget-Théniers. Access to the commune is by the D27 road from Toudon in the south-east passing through the heart of the commune and the village and continuing west to Puget-Théniers. the D427 road branches off the D27 in the commune and goes south-west to join the D17 road which goes to Sigale in the south. Apart from the village there are the hamlets of Rourebel, Les Chats, and Les Crottes all along the D27 road. The commune is very rugged and alpine in nature with large forests.

== Toponymy ==
The commune name in Occitan is Als Cros and in Italian Ascroso.

== History ==
Many ancient remains have been found in the commune including tombs dating from the Bronze Age and from Antiquity (Roman Empire).

The village is cited under the name of Castrum de Crocis in 1066. Its current name of Ascros was adopted in 1760. The origin of the name is the Low Latin crosus meaning "depression".

The current village is located at an altitude of 1,145 metres above sea level in a defensive site. In 1252 Raibaud d'Ascros, Lord of Ascros or of Crocquio, seized the lordship of Toudon before being chased out.

The commune is a former fief of the barons then the counts of Beuil.

In 1508 Georges Grimaldi, Lord of Beuil, and his cousin Jean Grimaldi, Lord of Levens agreed with King Louis XII to deliver Nice to the king in exchange for some lordships perhaps through the Governor of Provence of whom Georges was the son-in-law. This agreement failed. They were then summoned to come and explain to the Governor of Nice, Squire of La Pallud. Georges refused. On 5 January 1508 in his chateau at Beuil his barber, Esprit Testoris, slit his throat, possibly paid by the Governor of Nice. The County of Beuil then reverted to his younger brother, Honoré, Lord of Ascros. Honoré I of Beuil, friend of Charles III, Duke of Savoy, was appointed Governor of Nice and faithfully provided the defence of the county.

In 1526 Jean-Baptiste Grimaldi, second son of Honoré I (d. 1537) and Lord of Ascros, was accused by another Honoré, Lord of Les Ferres and of Gilette, of plotting with his brother, René Grimaldi - Lord of Massoins, against the Duke of Savoy with the King of France. In revenge the two brothers laid siege to the chateau of Gilette where the Lord of Les Ferres was but who managed to escape. The Governor of Nice, having seen the troubles that the Duke had made, ordered the return of the Chateau of Gilette which was achieved after two months of siege. The brothers had to flee. Their father had to seek clemency from the Duke for them, which was obtained by an act of 6 December 1529 after the Paix des Dames or Treaty of Cambrai. Meanwhile, the Lord of Les Ferres retaliated by attacking Rigaud in 1528. René returned to the county and was murdered in his sleep by one of his servants who was paid by his opponents. Jean-Baptiste then intrigued with France and decided to make war against the Duke of Savoy.

In August 1543 throughout the County of Nice the population rose against the Duke and, between 11 and 16 August 1543, there was terror with looting, and burning of those villages that did not recognize the King of France. Jean-Baptiste Grimaldi of Beuil was killed in 1544 at the Battle of Cérisoles fighting for the King of France.

The revolt of Annibal Grimaldi brought about his conviction and execution in 1621 and, the chateau was destroyed by order of Charles Emmanuel I, Duke of Savoy. The fief of Ascros was given to one Galléan then went to the Caissoti family who were Lords of Roubion who also owned the lordship of Toudon.

In 1793, during the Battle of Gilette, 300 men camped in the village.

Apart from the traditional cultivation of cereals, the village also lived on the raising of sheep and goats. Some people also operated small mines and quarries in the late 19th century.

During the Second World War the village provided refuge for Jews but a raid led to three arrests.

=== Heraldry ===
Arms of Ascros	Blazon: Quarterly, 1 and 4 lozengy of Argent and Gules; 2 Azure, a mullet of 8 points of Or; 3 Or, a fesse of Azure.

== Administration ==
List of Successive Mayors

From	To	Name	Party
1801	1813	Jean-André Gastaud	
1813	1816	Jean-Honoré Gastaud	
1816	1821	Joseph Gastaud	
1821	1826	Benoit Dalmas	
1826	1832	Jean-Baptiste Gastaud	
1832	1834	Benoit Dalmas	
1834	1841	Honoré Brun	
1841	1849	Jean-Baptiste Gastaud	
1849	1850	Pierre Dalmas	
1850	1864	Jean-Baptiste Gastaud	
1864	1871	Denis Dalmas	
1871	1874	Léon Gastaud	
1874	1884	Antoine Dalmas	
1884	1889	Thomas Raybaud	
1889	1889	Angelin Passeron	
1889	1892	Véran Dalmas	
1892	1896	Benoit Dalmas	
1896	1912	Louis Alziary	
1912	1912	Jean Niel	
1912	1929	Angelin Raybaud	
1929	1947	Louis Dalmas	
1947	1965	Angelin Raybaud	
1965	1977	Denis Gastaud	
1977	1995	Raoul Gastaud	
1995	Current	Vincent Giobergia	UMP then LR

A municipal election was held in 1999 following a long municipal crisis leading to the dissolution of the council by the Council of Ministers and leading to the election of Vincent Giobergia.

From 1 January 2014 Ascos has been a member of the Community of Communes of Alpes d'Azur. Formerly it was a member of the Community of communes of vallées d'Azur until this disappeared under the new departmental plan for inter-communal cooperation.

== Population ==
The inhabitants of the commune are known as Ascrossois or Ascrossoises in French.

Historical population
Year	Pop.	±% p.a.
1968	143	—
1975	120	−2.47%
1982	132	+1.37%
1990	123	−0.88%
1999	145	+1.85%
2007	150	+0.42%
2012	169	+2.41%
2017	169	+0.00%
2023	174	+0.49%
Source: INSEE

Older demographics can be found in the book:

- Alain Ruggiero, The population of the County of Nice from 1693 to 1939, Serre éditeur, Nice, 2002 (ISBN 2-86410-342-7)

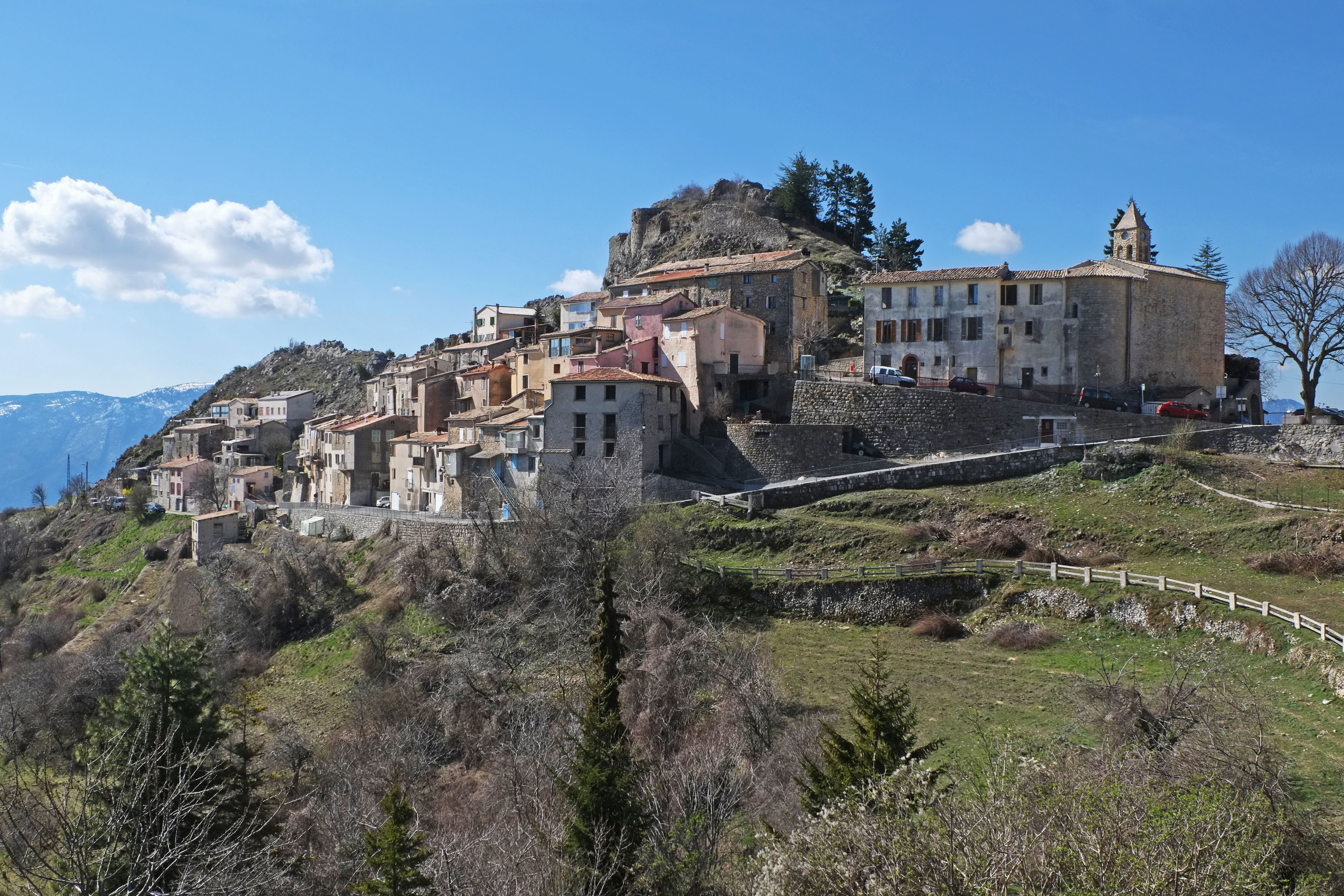
View of Ascos coming from Toudon

== Sites and Monuments ==
- The Church of Saint-Véran, a Romanesque church from the 12th century rebuilt. The church has a nave with three arched vaults and a semi-circular vaulted Apse cul-de-four. The side tower has been rebuilt with an entrance porch.
- Ruins of the feudal Chateau des Grimaldi.
- Chapel of Sainte-Anne at the entrance to the village - a place of pilgrimage.
- The hamlet of Crottes to the east of the village. A Roman road passed through here. A pathway leads to the Chapel of Sainte-Baume.

== See also ==
=== Bibliography ===
- Sylvain Gagnière, Ascros (Alpes-Maritimes), Gallia Préhistoire, IV, 1961, p. 378. (in French)
- Sylvain Gagnière, Ascros (Alpes-Maritimes), Gallia Préhistoire, VI, 1963, p. 366-368. (in French)
- Yves Bernard, The Tourist and Cultural Annual of Alpes-Maritimes and Monaco, p. 221, Éditions Campanile, 1997 ISBN 2912366-003 (in French)

=== Related articles ===
- Communes of the Alpes-Maritimes department
