= Bairols =

Commune in Provence-Alpes-Côte d'Azur, France

- Commune
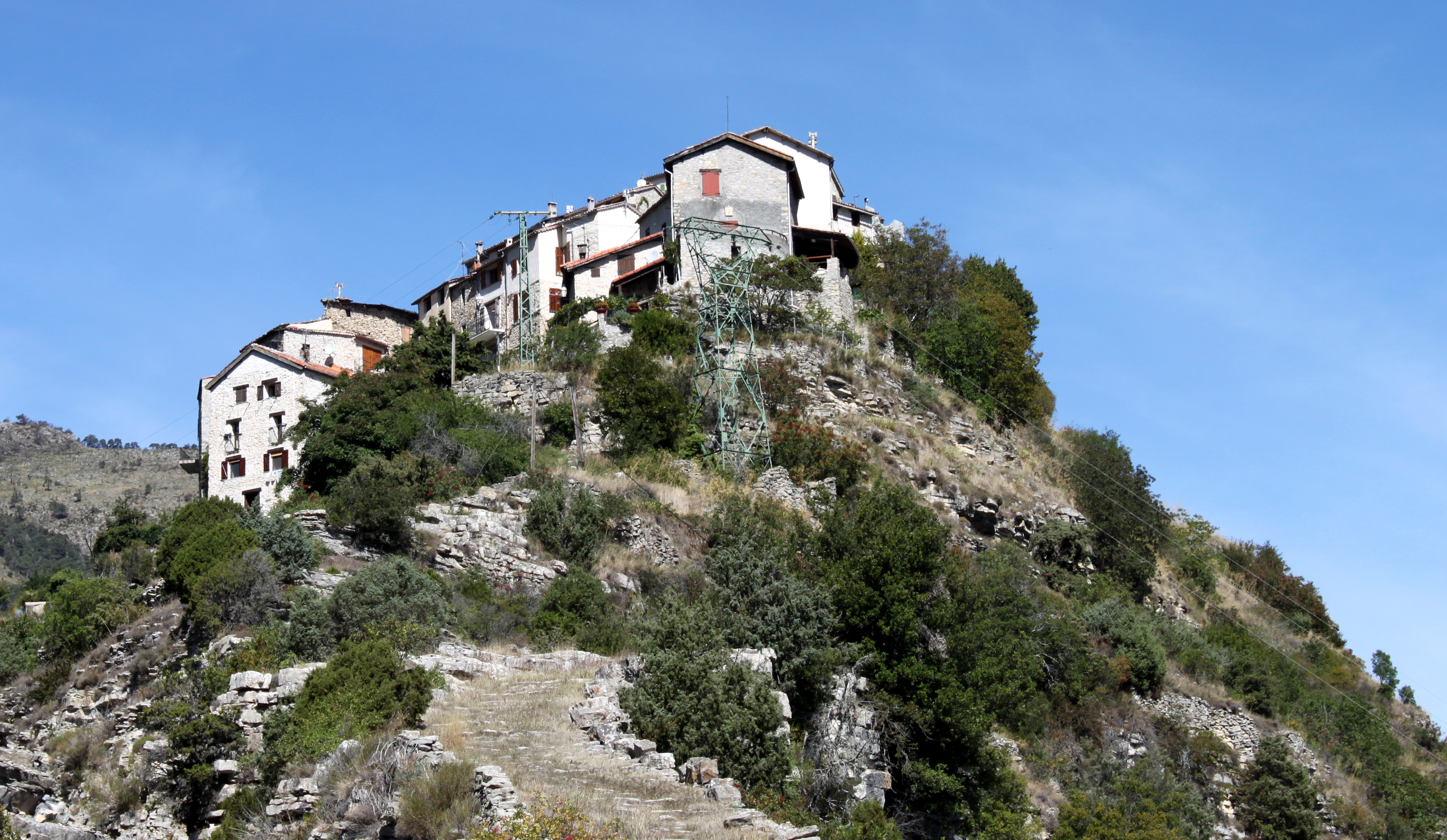
- A general view of the village

- Coat of arms
- Location of Bairols
- Location within France Location within Provence-Alpes-Côte d'Azur
- Coordinates: 43°58′57″N 7°07′41″E
- Country: France
- Region: Provence-Alpes-Côte d'Azur
- Department: Alpes-Maritimes
- Arrondissement: Nice
- Canton: Vence
- Intercommunality: Métropole Nice Côte d'Azur

Government
  - Mayor (2026–32): Jacques Demaurizi
- Area^{1}: 15.24 km^{2} (5.88 sq mi)
- Elevation: 880 m (2,890 ft)
- Highest elevation: 1,803 m (5,915 ft)
- Lowest elevation: 280 m (920 ft)
- Population (2023): 105
  - Density: 6.89/km^{2} (17.8/sq mi)
- Time zone: UTC+01:00 (CET)
  - Summer (DST): UTC+02:00 (CEST)
- INSEE/Postal code: 06009 /06420
- ^{1} French Land Register data, which excludes lakes, ponds, glaciers > 1 km^{2} (0.386 sq mi or 247 acres) and river estuaries.

Bairols (French pronunciation: [bɛʁɔl]; Occitan: Bairòls) is a commune in the Alpes-Maritimes department in the Provence-Alpes-Côte d'Azur region of south-eastern France.

The commune has been awarded two flowers by the National Council of Towns and Villages in Bloom in the Competition of cities and villages in Bloom.

== Geography ==
Bairols is located at an altitude of 830 metres on a rocky ridge some 20 km north of Gilette and 5 km north of Villars-sur-Var. Access to the commune is by the M26 road from Tournefort in the south which passes through the south-eastern corner of the commune and connects with the tortuous M56 road which continues to the village. The commune is a rugged alpine commune.

The Tinée river forms the eastern border of the commune as it flows south to join the Var. Many tributaries rise in the commune and flow east to join the Tinée including the Vallon du Serre, the Ruisseau de Fava, the Vallon du Bairols, and the Ravin de Saint Martin.

== History ==
The name Bairolum is cited around 1040. The village was then given to Lérins Abbey then became a fief of the Grimaldi.

The village was linked to the outside world by a motorable road in 1939. There were still 257 inhabitants in 1858.

=== Heraldry ===
Arms of Bairols	The official status of the blazon remains to be determined. Blazon: Party per fess embattled, 1 Argent charged with a mullet of 8 points, 2 Gules.

== Administration ==
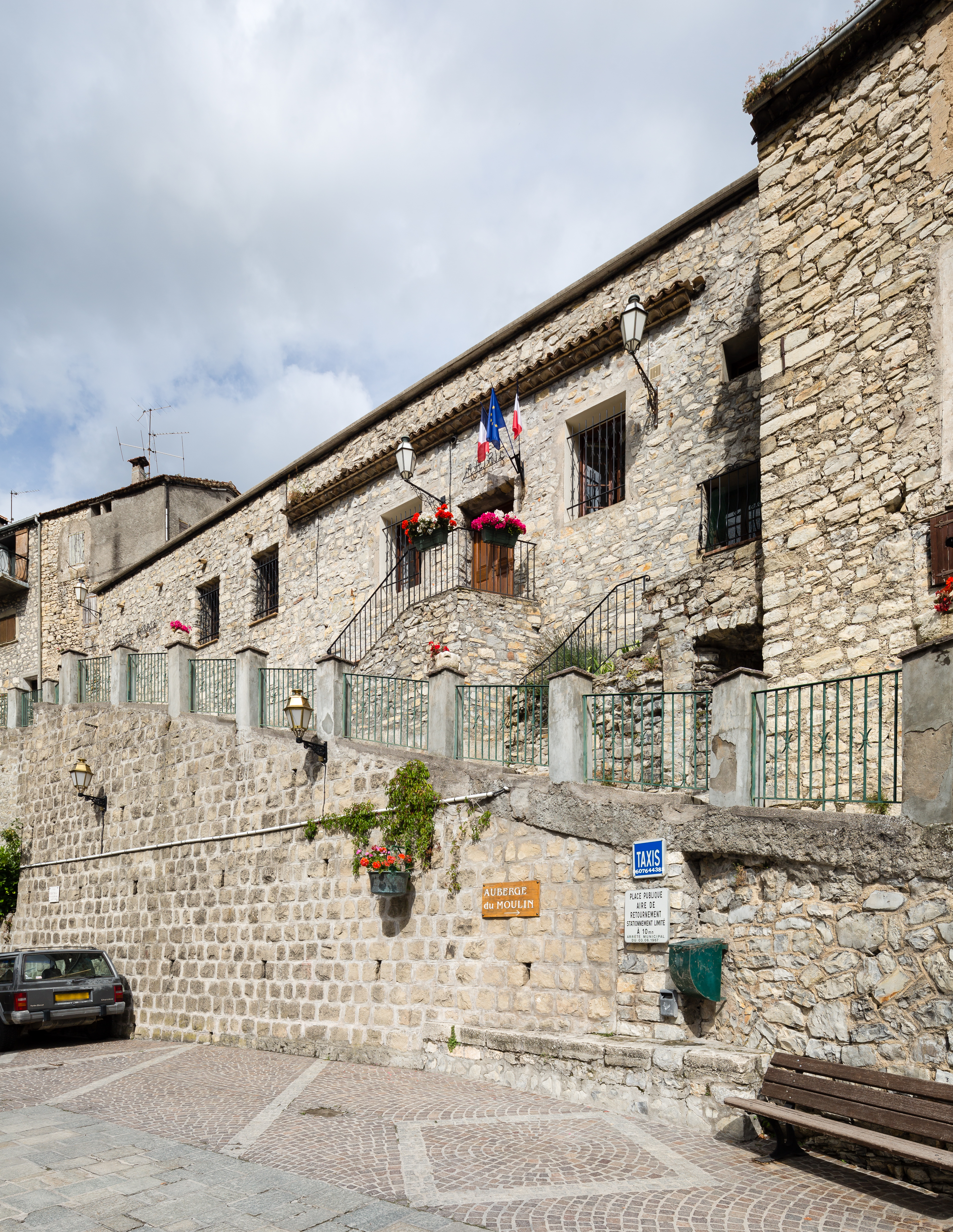
The Town Hall

List of successive mayors
From	To	Name
2001	2021	Angelin Buerch
2021	2023	Claude Mercanti
2023	incumbent	Jacques Demaurizi

== Population ==
The inhabitants of the commune are known as Bairolois or Bairoloises in French.

Historical population
Year	Pop.	±% p.a.
1968	37	—
1975	30	−2.95%
1982	38	+3.43%
1990	73	+8.50%
1999	114	+5.08%
2007	104	−1.14%
2012	108	+0.76%
2017	105	−0.56%
2023	105	+0.00%
Source: INSEE

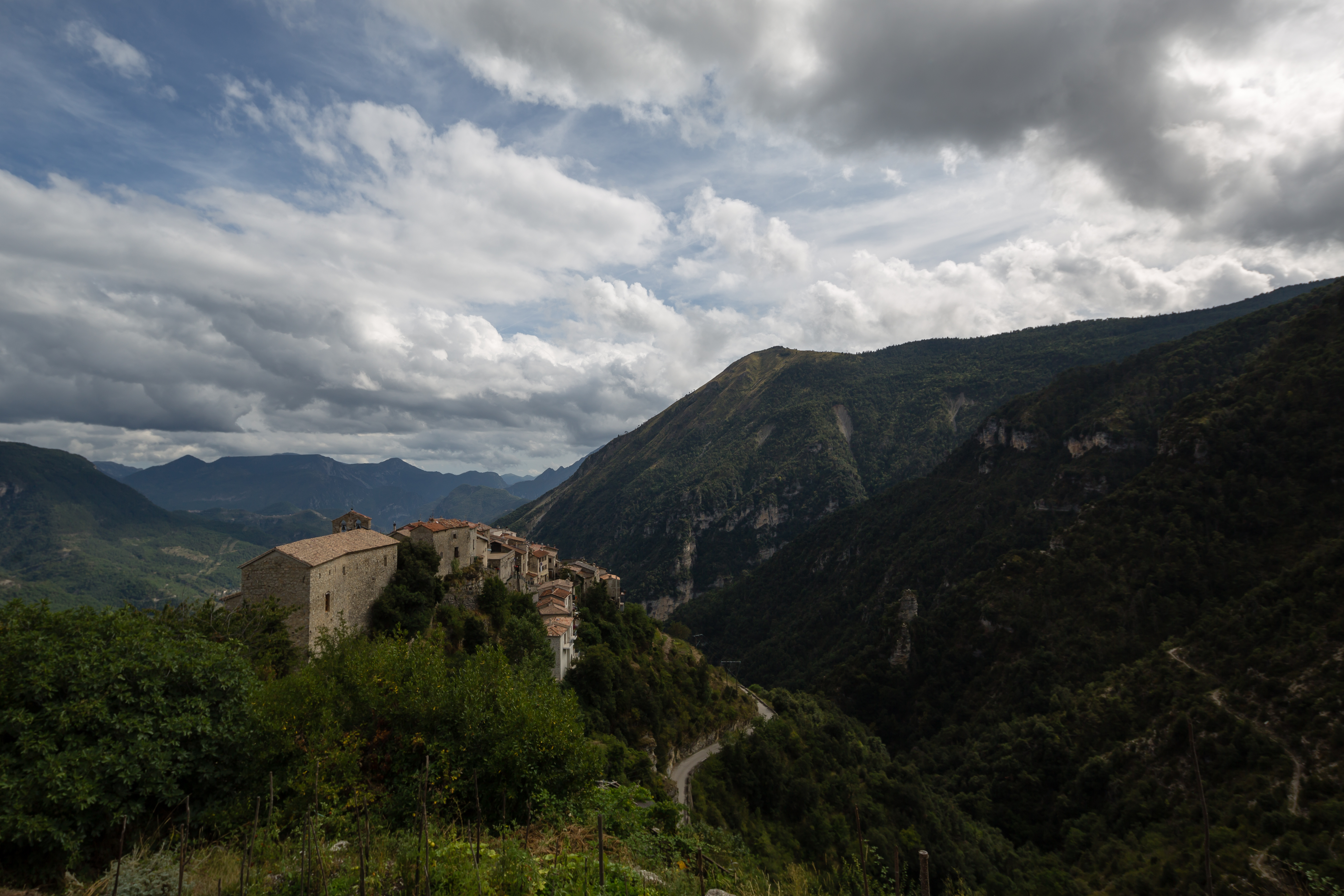
View of the village from the heights

== Sites and Monuments ==
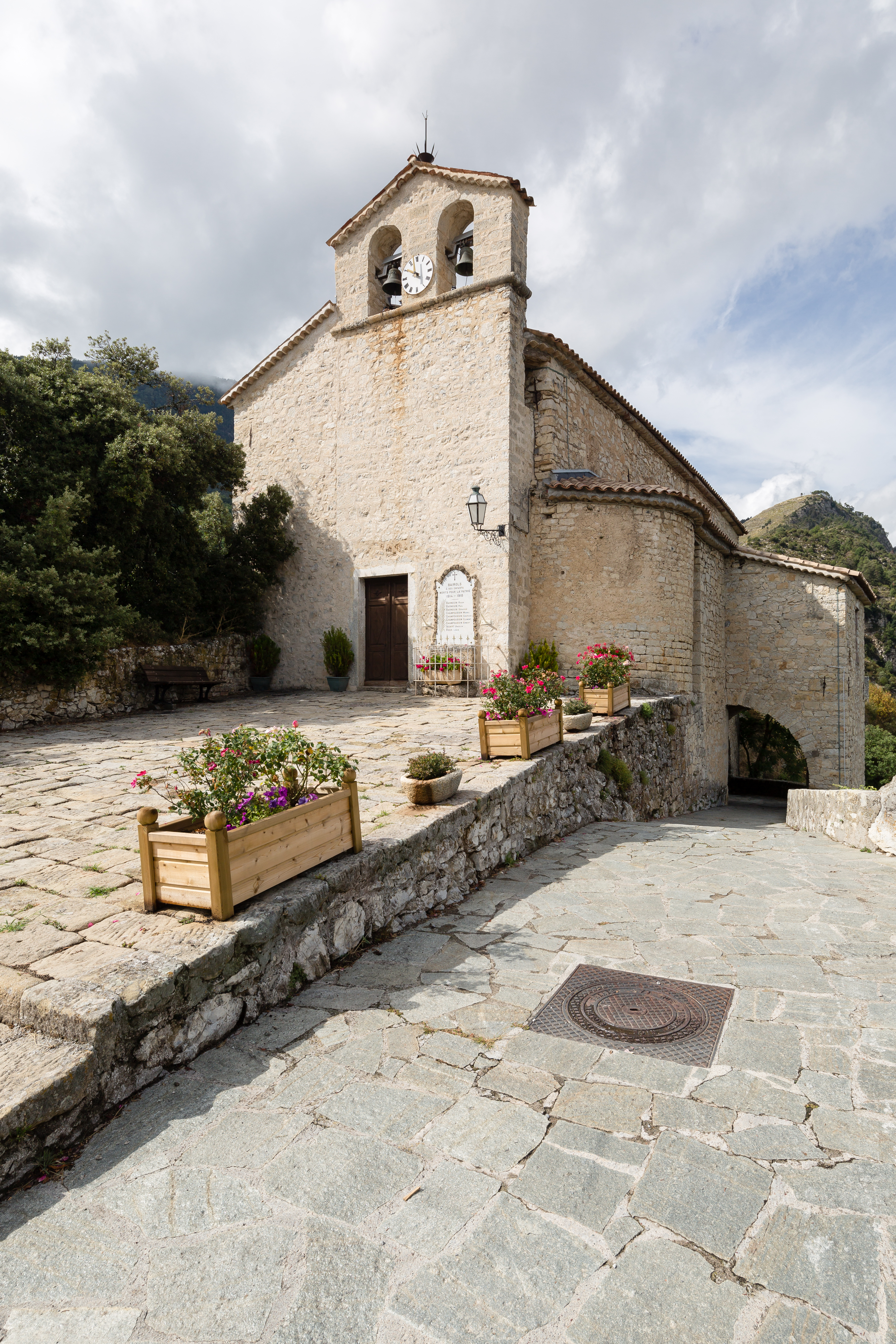
The facade of the Church

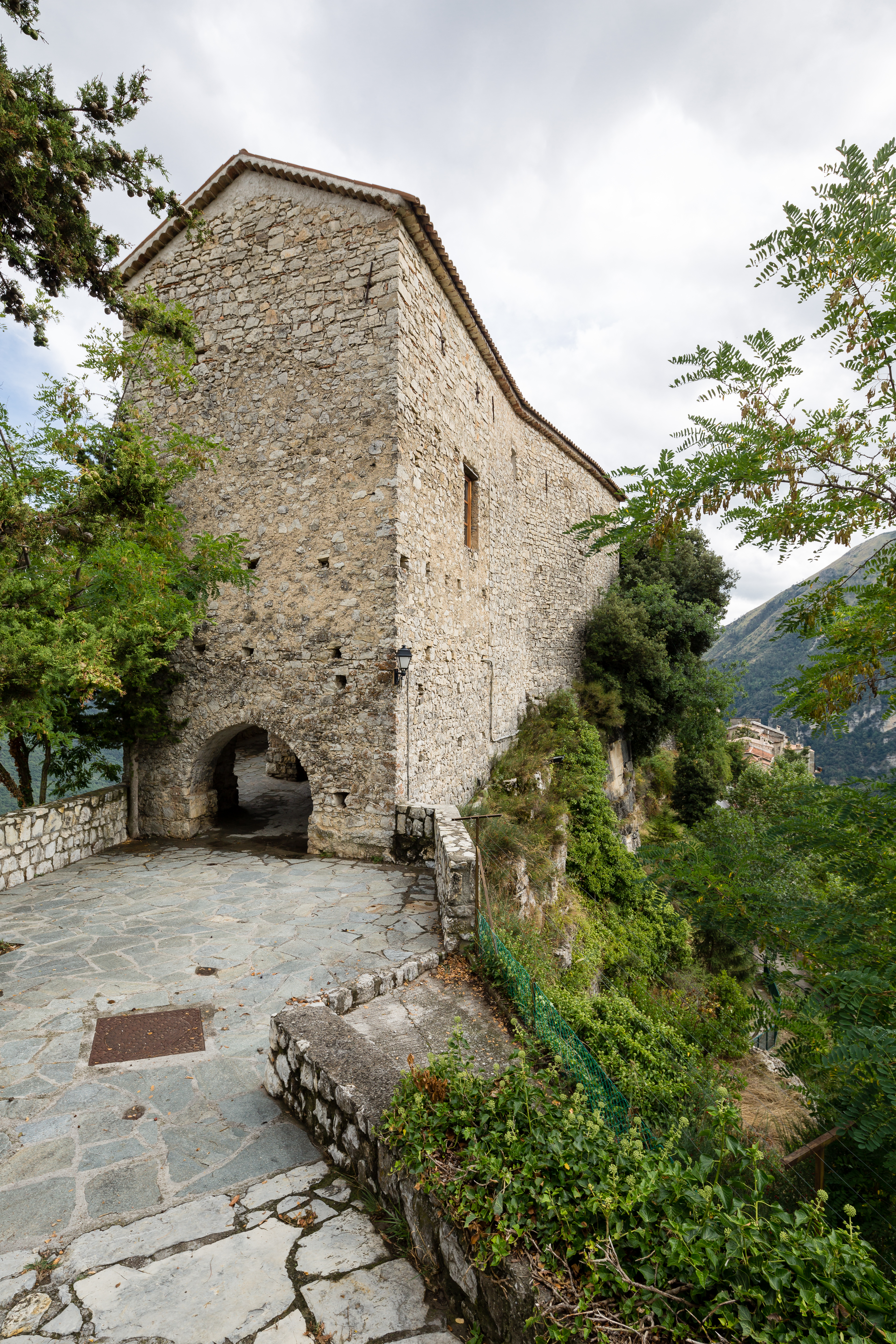
The Chevet of the Church

- Ruins of a Chateau
- The Medieval Church of Sainte-Marguerite whose "S" form is due to the topography. Inside there are two frescoes in the choir on the theme of the Baptism of Christ. The church has a painting by Jean Rocca of the Virgin of the Rosary and Mysteries dated 1645. The church also contains a Group Sculpture on a Processional dais of Saint Marguerite and the Tarasque (18th century) which is registered as an historical object.
- The Chapel of Saint Antoine above the village
- The Chapel of Saint-Roch, above, built around 1750
- Remains of the Chapel of Saint-Martin
- Two former oil and grain mills
- The remains of the old village below the present village.

== See also ==
- Communes of the Alpes-Maritimes department

== Bibliography ==
- Philippe de Beauchamp, The misunderstood High Country. Isolated Villages and Hamlets of Alpes-Marities, p. 81, éditions Serre, Nice, 1989, ISBN 2-86410-131-9; p. 159 (in French)
