= Tournefort =

Tournefort may refer to:

- Joseph Pitton de Tournefort (1656–1708), French botanist
- Tournefort, Alpes-Maritimes, a commune in the Alpes-Maritimes département, in France
- Cape Tournefort, a headland in Sleaford Bay, in South Australia, Australia
