= Villeneuve-d'Entraunes =

Commune in Provence-Alpes-Côte d'Azur, France

Villeneuve-d'Entraunes Vilanuòva d'Entraunas (Occitan)
- Commune
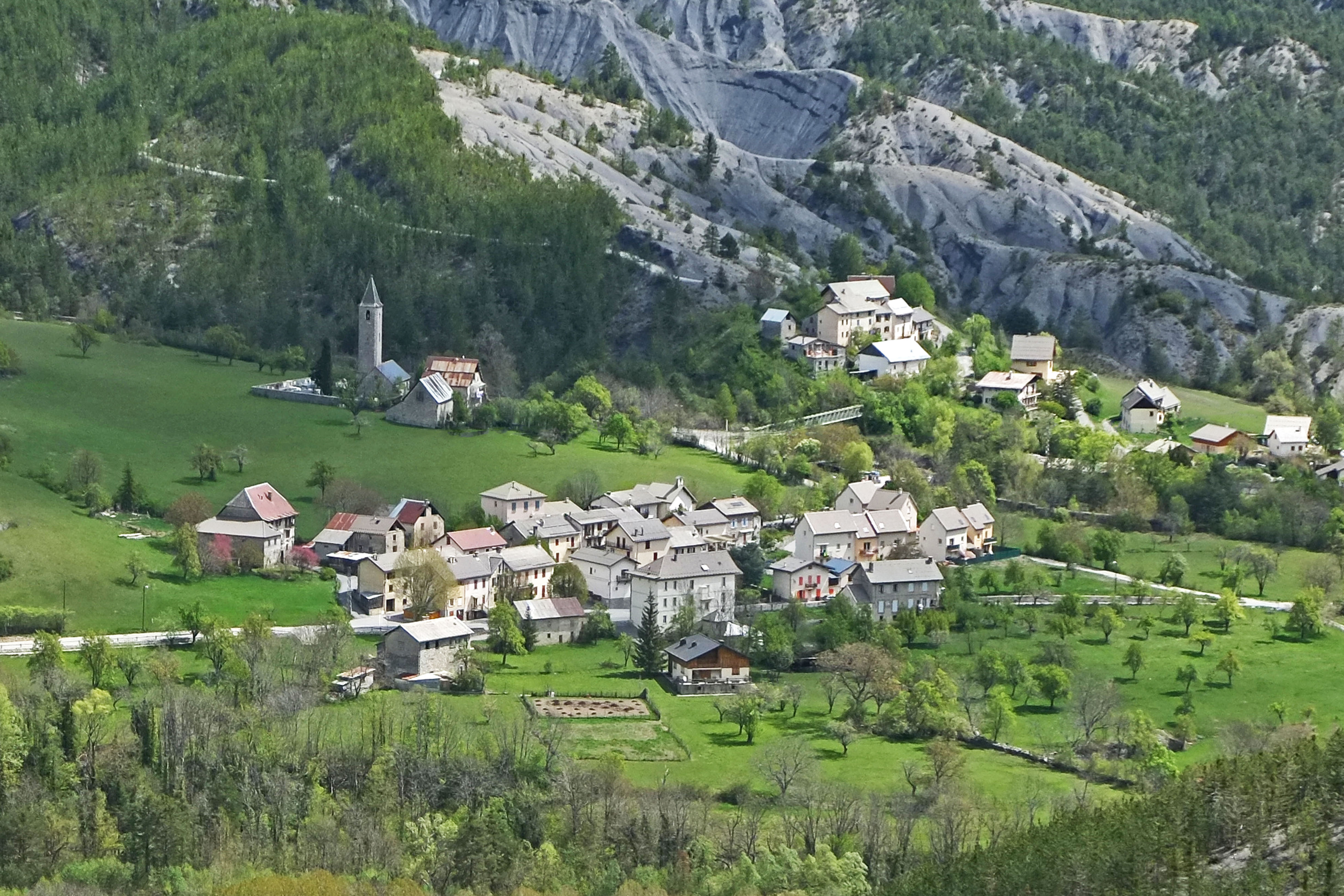
- A view of the village of Villeneuve-d'Entraunes, after climbing to Enaux

- Coat of arms
- Location of Villeneuve-d'Entraunes
- Location within France Location within Provence-Alpes-Côte d'Azur
- Coordinates: 44°07′15″N 6°47′46″E
- Country: France
- Region: Provence-Alpes-Côte d'Azur
- Department: Alpes-Maritimes
- Arrondissement: Nice
- Canton: Vence
- Intercommunality: CC Alpes d'Azur

Government
  - Mayor (2026–32): Jean-Pierre Audibert
- Area^{1}: 28.2 km^{2} (10.9 sq mi)
- Elevation: 950 m (3,120 ft)
- Highest elevation: 2,457 m (8,061 ft)
- Lowest elevation: 858 m (2,815 ft)
- Population (2023): 82
  - Density: 2.9/km^{2} (7.5/sq mi)
- Demonym: Villeneuvois
- Time zone: UTC+01:00 (CET)
  - Summer (DST): UTC+02:00 (CEST)
- INSEE/Postal code: 06160 /06470
- ^{1} French Land Register data, which excludes lakes, ponds, glaciers > 1 km^{2} (0.386 sq mi or 247 acres) and river estuaries.

Villeneuve-d'Entraunes (French pronunciation: [vilnœv dɑ̃tʁon]; Occitan: Vilanuòva d'Entraunas; lit. 'Villeneuve of Entraunes') is a rural commune in the Alpes-Maritimes department in the Provence-Alpes-Côte d'Azur region in Southeastern France. It is on the river Var, on the departmental border with Alpes-de-Haute-Provence.

== Politics and administration ==
List of 21st-century mayors of Villeneuve-d'Entraunes
In office		Mayor	Party	Ref.
1996	Incumbent	Jean-Pierre Audibert	DVD	

== Population ==
Historical population
Year	Pop.	±% p.a.
1968	82	—
1975	76	−1.08%
1982	61	−3.09%
1990	76	+2.79%
1999	73	−0.45%
2007	81	+1.31%
2012	73	−2.06%
2017	80	+1.85%
2023	82	+0.41%
Source: INSEE

== Gallery ==
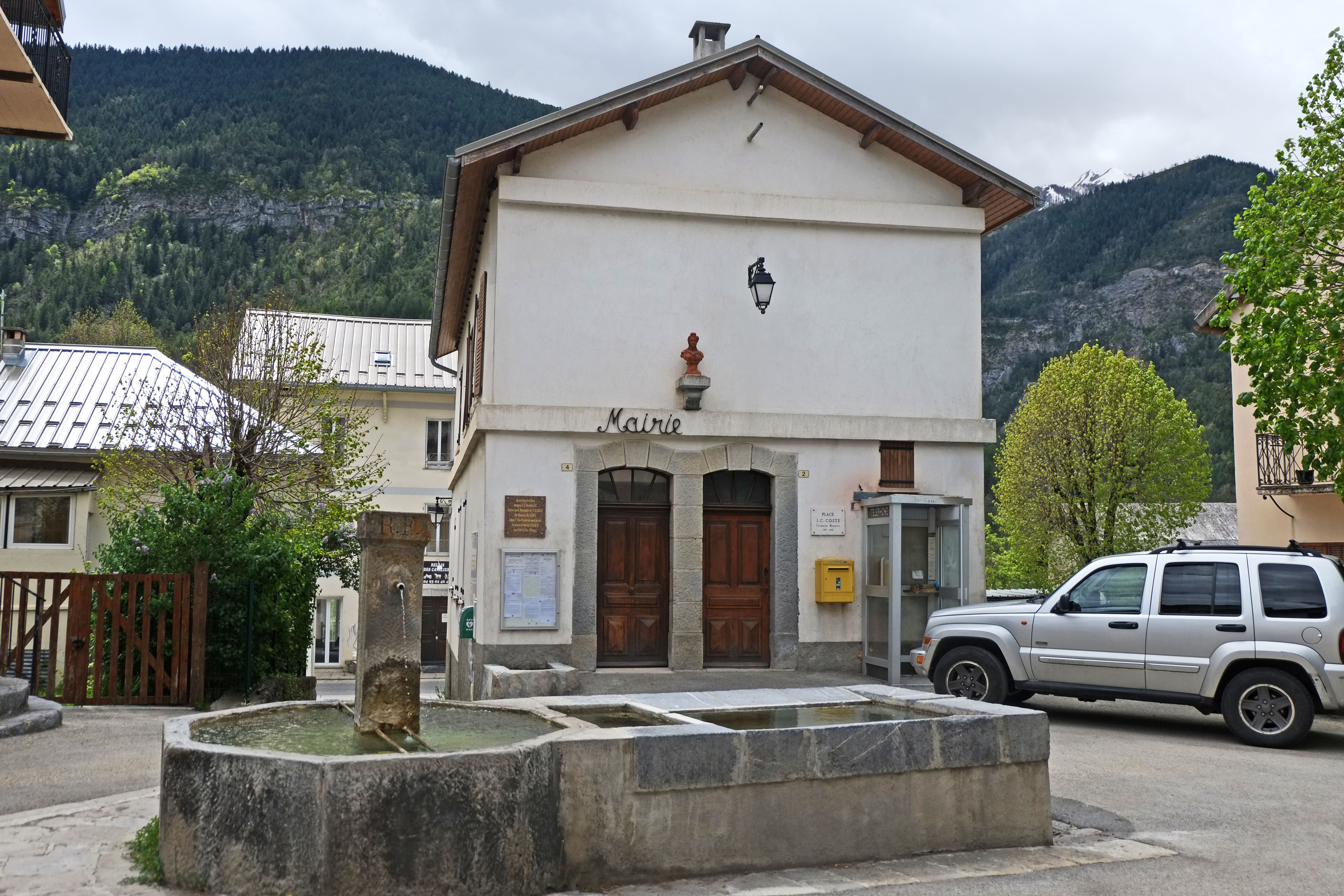
The town hall in Villeneuve-d'Entraunes

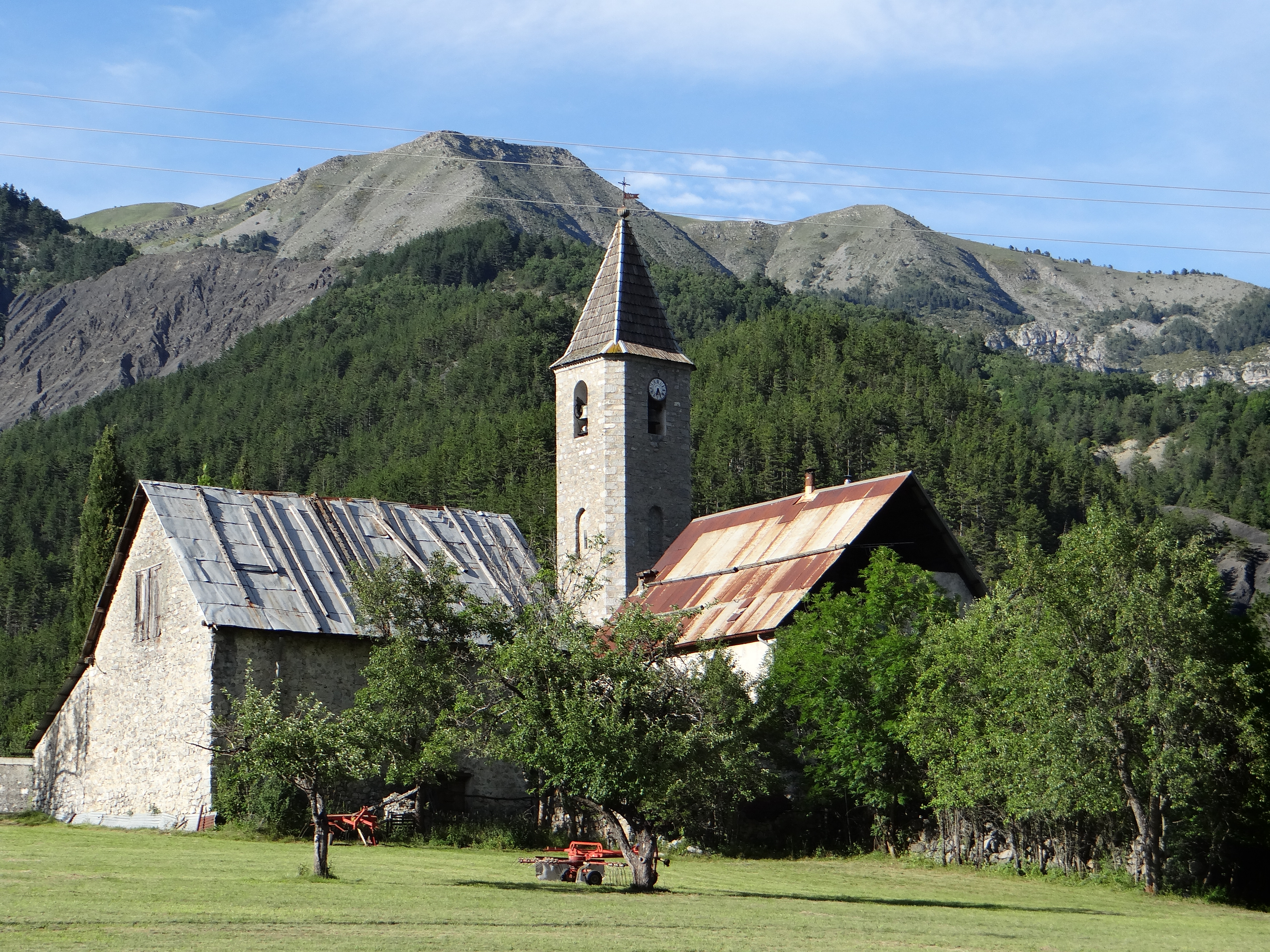
Église Saint-Pierre

== See also ==
- Communes of the Alpes-Maritimes department
