= Pierrefeu =

Commune in Provence-Alpes-Côte d'Azur, France

- Commune
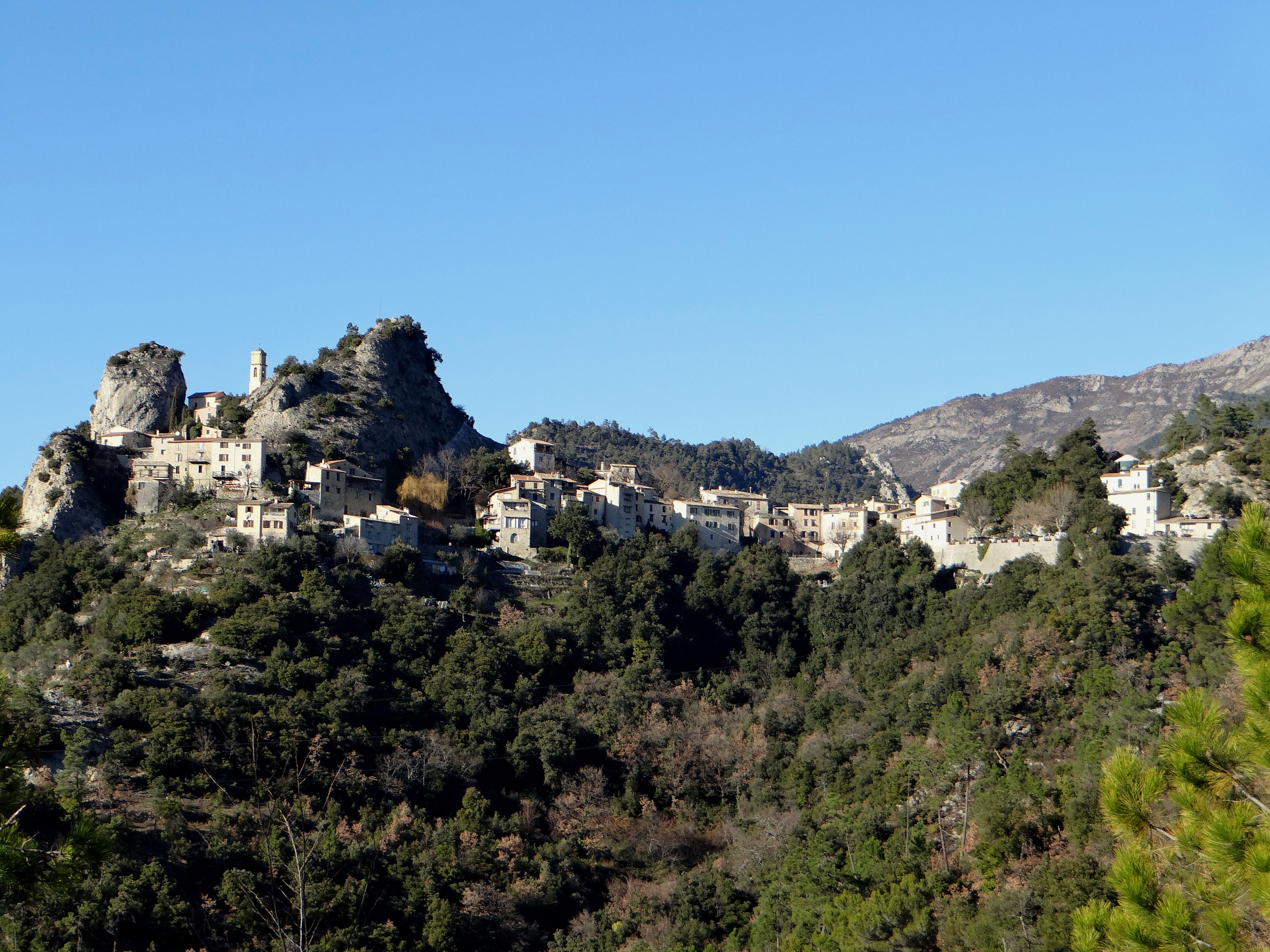
- A general view of the village of Pierrefeu

- Coat of arms
- Location of Pierrefeu
- Location within France Location within Provence-Alpes-Côte d'Azur
- Coordinates: 43°52′33″N 7°04′57″E
- Country: France
- Region: Provence-Alpes-Côte d'Azur
- Department: Alpes-Maritimes
- Arrondissement: Nice
- Canton: Vence

Government
  - Mayor (2026–32): Marc Belvisi
- Area^{1}: 22.27 km^{2} (8.60 sq mi)
- Elevation: 690 m (2,260 ft)
- Highest elevation: 1,520 m (4,990 ft)
- Lowest elevation: 222 m (728 ft)
- Population (2023): 337
  - Density: 15.1/km^{2} (39.2/sq mi)
- Time zone: UTC+01:00 (CET)
  - Summer (DST): UTC+02:00 (CEST)
- INSEE/Postal code: 06097 /06910
- ^{1} French Land Register data, which excludes lakes, ponds, glaciers > 1 km^{2} (0.386 sq mi or 247 acres) and river estuaries.

Pierrefeu (French pronunciation: [pjɛʁfø]; Occitan: Peirafuec; Italian: Pietrafuoco) is a commune in the Alpes-Maritimes department in southeastern France.

== Population ==
Historical population
Year	Pop.	±% p.a.
1968	79	—
1975	58	−4.32%
1982	114	+10.13%
1990	207	+7.74%
1999	243	+1.80%
2007	253	+0.51%
2012	282	+2.19%
2017	324	+2.82%
2023	337	+0.66%
Source: INSEE

== See also ==
- Communes of the Alpes-Maritimes department
