= Sauze, Alpes-Maritimes =

Commune in Provence-Alpes-Côte d'Azur, France

Sauze
- Commune
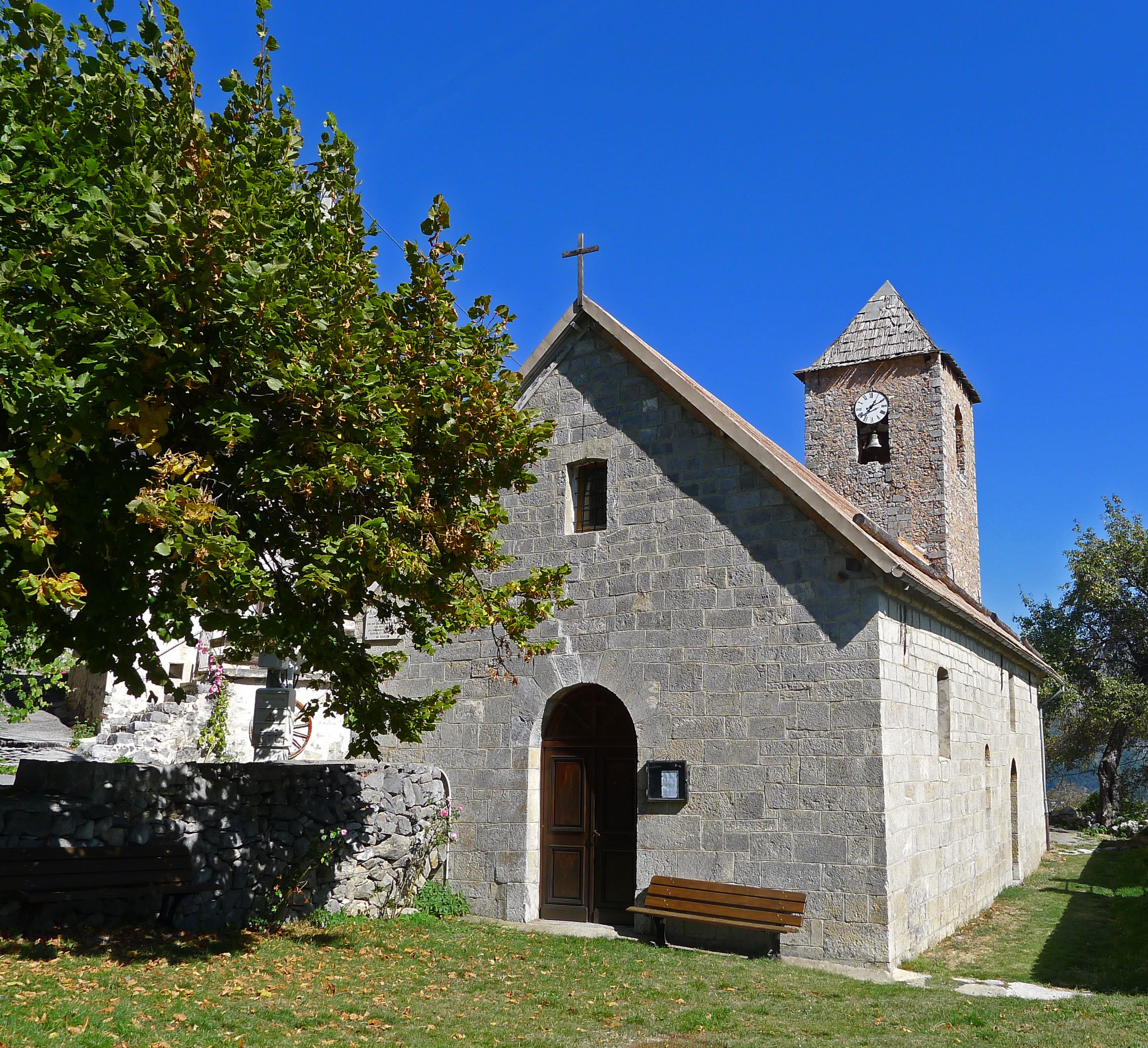
- The church of Sauze

- Coat of arms
- Location of Sauze
- Location within France Location within Provence-Alpes-Côte d'Azur
- Coordinates: 44°05′19″N 6°50′08″E
- Country: France
- Region: Provence-Alpes-Côte d'Azur
- Department: Alpes-Maritimes
- Arrondissement: Nice
- Canton: Vence

Government
  - Mayor (2026–32): Nicole Bottero Bertolotti
- Area^{1}: 27.77 km^{2} (10.72 sq mi)
- Elevation: 1,365 m (4,478 ft)
- Highest elevation: 2,502 m (8,209 ft)
- Lowest elevation: 780 m (2,560 ft)
- Population (2023): 67
  - Density: 2.4/km^{2} (6.2/sq mi)
- Time zone: UTC+01:00 (CET)
  - Summer (DST): UTC+02:00 (CEST)
- INSEE/Postal code: 06133 /06470
- ^{1} French Land Register data, which excludes lakes, ponds, glaciers > 1 km^{2} (0.386 sq mi or 247 acres) and river estuaries.

Sauze (French pronunciation: [soz]; Occitan: Sause) is a commune in the Alpes-Maritimes department in southeastern France.

== Population ==
Historical population
Year	Pop.	±% p.a.
1968	42	—
1975	43	+0.34%
1982	85	+10.22%
1990	60	−4.26%
1999	100	+5.84%
2007	106	+0.73%
2012	84	−4.55%
2017	70	−3.58%
2023	67	−0.73%
Source: INSEE

== See also ==
- Communes of the Alpes-Maritimes department
