= Tourette-du-Château =

Commune in Provence-Alpes-Côte d'Azur, France

Tourette-du-Château Torreta d'en Castèu (Occitan)
- Commune
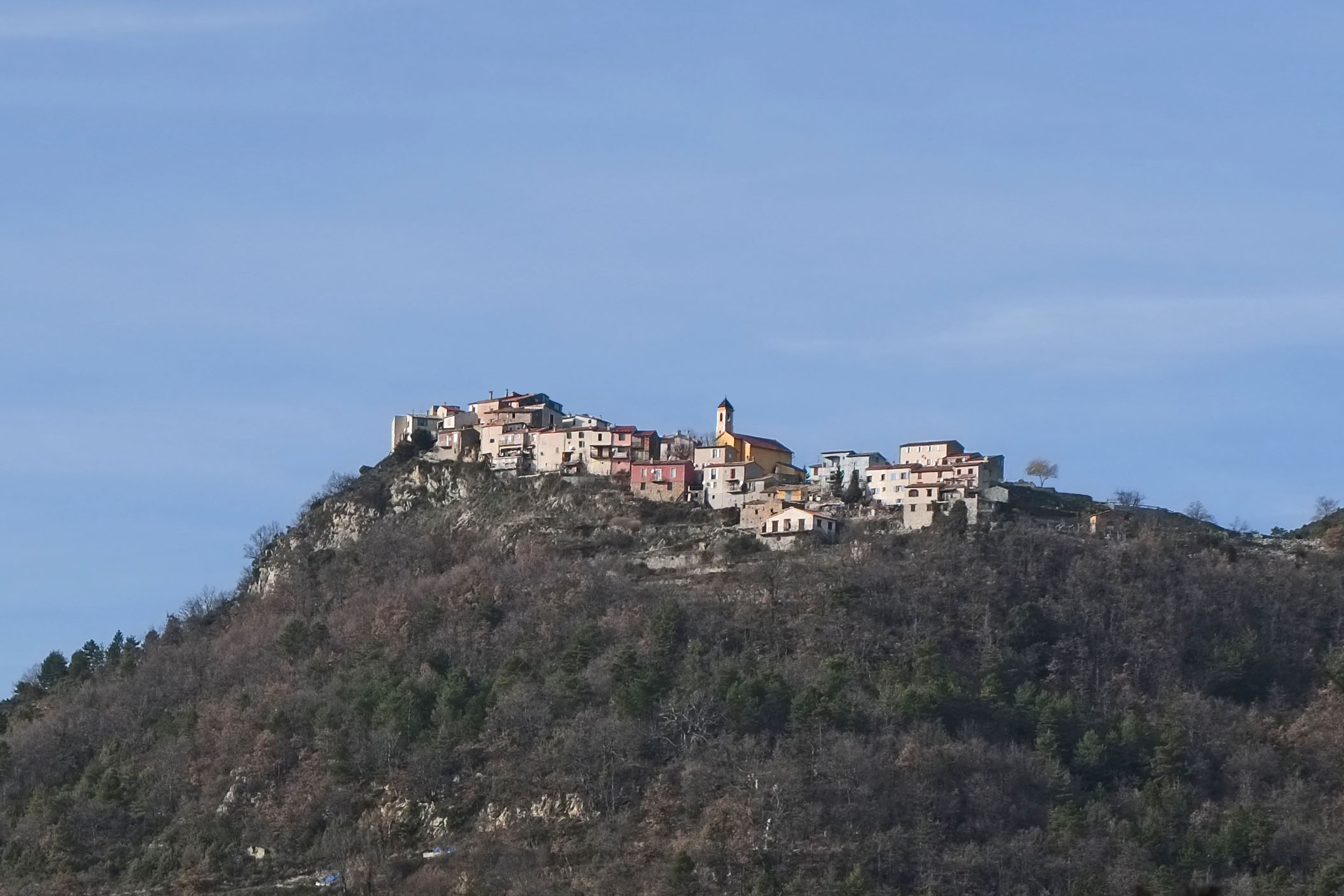
- A view of the village of Tourette-du-Château, from the road to Gilette

- Coat of arms
- Location of Tourette-du-Château
- Location within France Location within Provence-Alpes-Côte d'Azur
- Coordinates: 43°53′00″N 7°08′36″E
- Country: France
- Region: Provence-Alpes-Côte d'Azur
- Department: Alpes-Maritimes
- Arrondissement: Nice
- Canton: Vence

Government
  - Mayor (2026–32): Fabienne Roux-Chabaud
- Area^{1}: 9.74 km^{2} (3.76 sq mi)
- Elevation: 900 m (3,000 ft)
- Highest elevation: 1,551 m (5,089 ft)
- Lowest elevation: 276 m (906 ft)
- Population (2023): 147
  - Density: 15.1/km^{2} (39.1/sq mi)
- Time zone: UTC+01:00 (CET)
  - Summer (DST): UTC+02:00 (CEST)
- INSEE/Postal code: 06145 /06830
- ^{1} French Land Register data, which excludes lakes, ponds, glaciers > 1 km^{2} (0.386 sq mi or 247 acres) and river estuaries.

Tourette-du-Château (French: [tuʁɛt dy ʃɑto]; Occitan: Torreta d'en Castèu; Italian: Torretta) is a commune in the Alpes-Maritimes department in southeastern France.

== Population ==
Historical population
Year	Pop.	±% p.a.
1968	39	—
1975	23	−7.27%
1982	38	+7.44%
1990	66	+7.14%
1999	89	+3.38%
2007	116	+3.37%
2012	119	+0.51%
2017	130	+1.78%
2023	147	+2.07%
Source: INSEE

== See also ==
- Communes of the Alpes-Maritimes department
