= La Tour, Alpes-Maritimes =

Commune in Provence-Alpes-Côte d'Azur, France

La Tour
- Commune
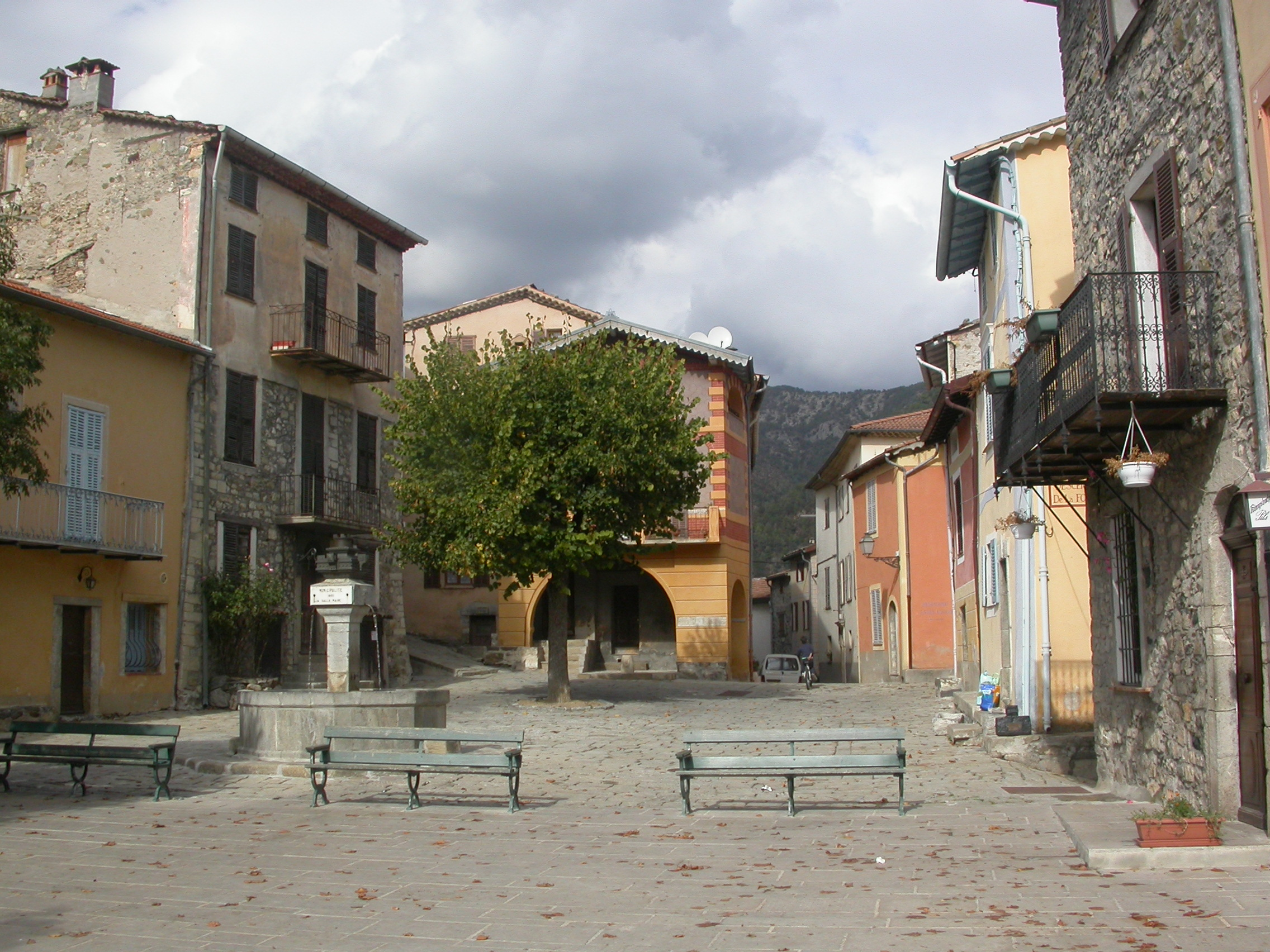
- The square in the village of La Tour

- Coat of arms
- Location of La Tour
- Location within France Location within Provence-Alpes-Côte d'Azur
- Coordinates: 43°56′52″N 7°11′06″E
- Country: France
- Region: Provence-Alpes-Côte d'Azur
- Department: Alpes-Maritimes
- Arrondissement: Nice
- Canton: Vence
- Intercommunality: Métropole Nice Côte d'Azur

Government
  - Mayor (2026–32): Thierry Roux
- Area^{1}: 36.7 km^{2} (14.2 sq mi)
- Elevation: 640 m (2,100 ft)
- Highest elevation: 1,900 m (6,200 ft)
- Lowest elevation: 195 m (640 ft)
- Population (2023): 540
  - Density: 15/km^{2} (38/sq mi)
- Demonym: Tourriers
- Time zone: UTC+01:00 (CET)
  - Summer (DST): UTC+02:00 (CEST)
- INSEE/Postal code: 06144 /06710
- ^{1} French Land Register data, which excludes lakes, ponds, glaciers > 1 km^{2} (0.386 sq mi or 247 acres) and river estuaries.

La Tour (French pronunciation: [la tuʁ]; Occitan: La Tor; Italian: La Torre) is a commune in the Alpes-Maritimes department in southeastern France.

== Population ==
Historical population
Year	Pop.	±% p.a.
1968	170	—
1975	176	+0.50%
1982	148	−2.44%
1990	286	+8.58%
1999	300	+0.53%
2007	424	+4.42%
2012	537	+4.84%
2017	567	+1.09%
2023	540	−0.81%
Source: INSEE

== See also ==
- Communes of the Alpes-Maritimes department
