= Canton of Vence =

Coordinates: 43.73°N 7.11°E

- Canton
- Situation of the canton of Vence in the department of Alpes-Maritimes
- Country: France
- Region: Provence-Alpes-Côte d'Azur
- Department: Alpes-Maritimes
- No. of communes: {{{nbcomm}}}
- Population (2023): 39,100
- INSEE code: 0626

The canton of Vence is an administrative division of the Alpes-Maritimes department, southeastern France. Its borders were modified at the French canton reorganisation which came into effect in March 2015. Its seat is in Vence.

It consists of the following communes:

1. Aiglun
2. Ascros
3. Auvare
4. Bairols
5. Beuil
6. Bézaudun-les-Alpes
7. Bonson
8. Bouyon
9. Châteauneuf-d'Entraunes
10. Conségudes
11. Coursegoules
12. La Croix-sur-Roudoule
13. Cuébris
14. Daluis
15. Entraunes
16. Les Ferres
17. Gilette
18. Guillaumes
19. Lieuche
20. Malaussène
21. Massoins
22. La Penne
23. Péone
24. Pierlas
25. Pierrefeu
26. Puget-Rostang
27. Puget-Théniers
28. Revest-les-Roches
29. Rigaud
30. La Roque-en-Provence
31. Roquestéron
32. Saint-Antonin
33. Saint-Jeannet
34. Saint-Léger
35. Saint-Martin-d'Entraunes
36. Sallagriffon
37. Sauze
38. Sigale
39. Thiéry
40. Toudon
41. Touët-sur-Var
42. La Tour
43. Tourette-du-Château
44. Tournefort
45. Vence
46. Villars-sur-Var
47. Villeneuve-d'Entraunes
