= Revest-les-Roches =

Commune in Provence-Alpes-Côte d'Azur, France

- Commune
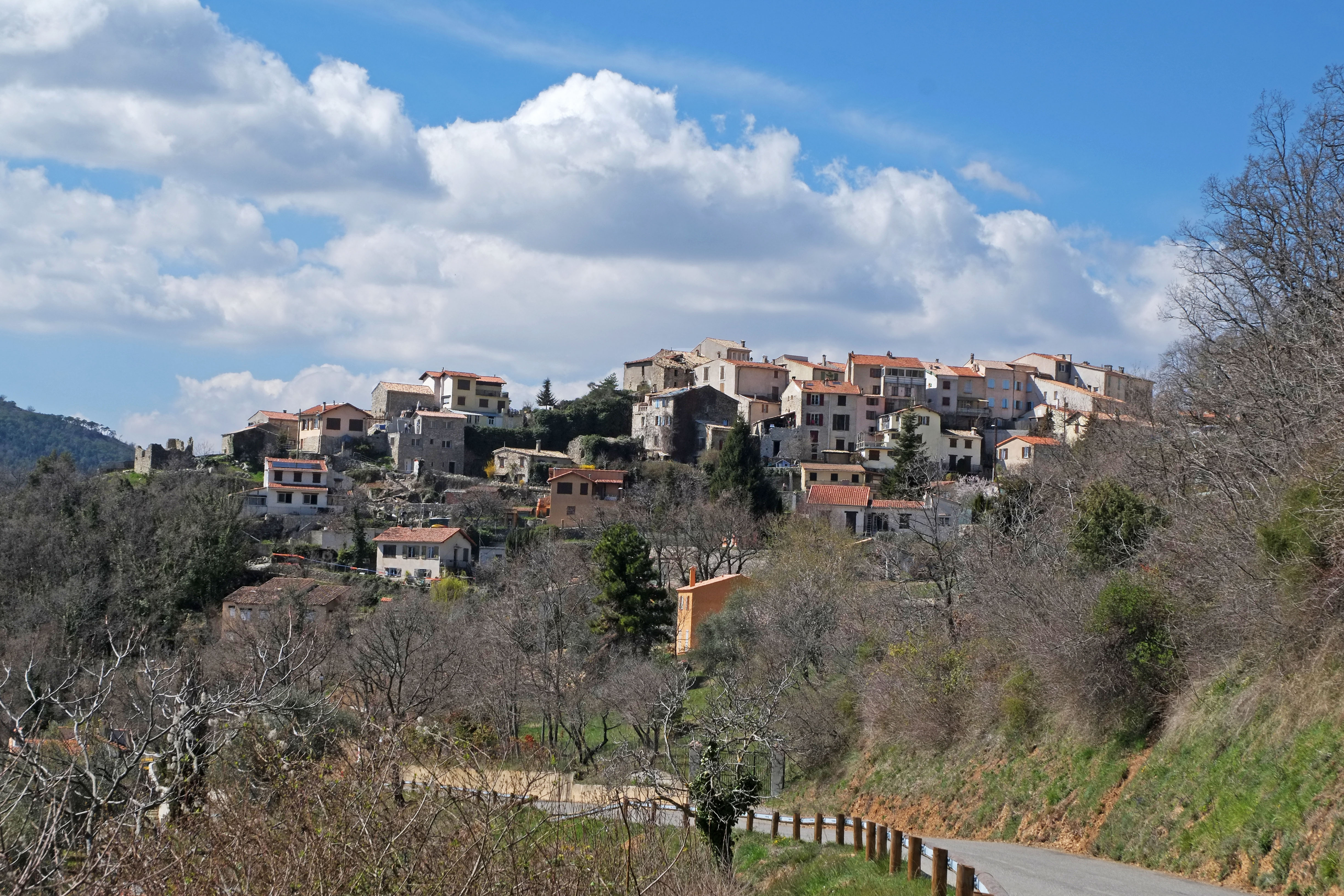
- View of the village on the way to Bonson

- Coat of arms
- Location of Revest-les-Roches
- Location within France Location within Provence-Alpes-Côte d'Azur
- Coordinates: 43°52′53″N 7°09′29″E
- Country: France
- Region: Provence-Alpes-Côte d'Azur
- Department: Alpes-Maritimes
- Arrondissement: Nice
- Canton: Vence

Government
  - Mayor (2026–32): Franck Autiero
- Area^{1}: 8.61 km^{2} (3.32 sq mi)
- Elevation: 853 m (2,799 ft)
- Highest elevation: 1,524 m (5,000 ft)
- Lowest elevation: 138 m (453 ft)
- Population (2023): 239
  - Density: 27.8/km^{2} (71.9/sq mi)
- Time zone: UTC+01:00 (CET)
  - Summer (DST): UTC+02:00 (CEST)
- INSEE/Postal code: 06100 /06830
- ^{1} French Land Register data, which excludes lakes, ponds, glaciers > 1 km^{2} (0.386 sq mi or 247 acres) and river estuaries.

Revest-les-Roches (French pronunciation: [ʁəvɛst le ʁɔʃ]; Occitan: So Revest dei Ròcas) is a commune in the Alpes-Maritimes department in southeastern France.

Its inhabitants are called Revestois.

== Toponymy ==
The name of the village, as it was first recorded in 1007 (Revestis), comes from the Occitan So Revèst, a variant of revèrs, and means a site exposed to the north.

== Population ==
Historical population
Year	Pop.	±% p.a.
1968	25	—
1975	25	+0.00%
1982	49	+10.09%
1990	122	+12.08%
1999	162	+3.20%
2007	199	+2.60%
2012	211	+1.18%
2017	235	+2.18%
2023	239	+0.28%
Source: INSEE

== See also ==
- Communes of the Alpes-Maritimes department
