= La Croix-sur-Roudoule =

Commune in Provence-Alpes-Côte d'Azur, France

- Commune
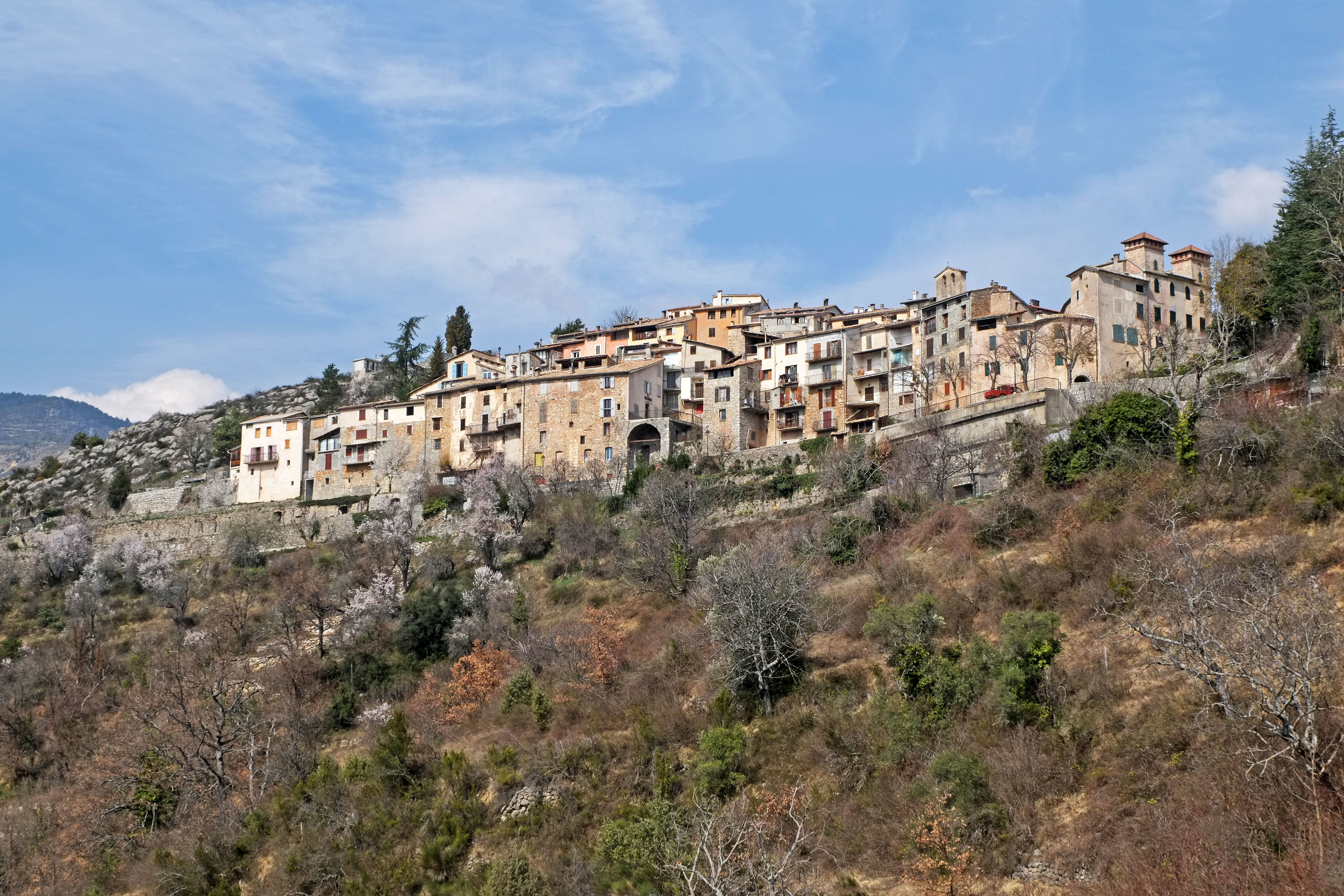
- A view of the village from the nearby valley

- Coat of arms
- Location of La Croix-sur-Roudoule
- Location within France Location within Provence-Alpes-Côte d'Azur
- Coordinates: 43°59′18″N 6°52′33″E
- Country: France
- Region: Provence-Alpes-Côte d'Azur
- Department: Alpes-Maritimes
- Arrondissement: Nice
- Canton: Vence

Government
  - Mayor (2026–32): Daniel Glanis
- Area^{1}: 30.06 km^{2} (11.61 sq mi)
- Elevation: 800 m (2,600 ft)
- Highest elevation: 1,743 m (5,719 ft)
- Lowest elevation: 495 m (1,624 ft)
- Population (2023): 96
  - Density: 3.2/km^{2} (8.3/sq mi)
- Demonym: Crousencs
- Time zone: UTC+01:00 (CET)
  - Summer (DST): UTC+02:00 (CEST)
- INSEE/Postal code: 06051 /06260
- ^{1} French Land Register data, which excludes lakes, ponds, glaciers > 1 km^{2} (0.386 sq mi or 247 acres) and river estuaries.

La Croix-sur-Roudoule (French pronunciation: [la kʁwa syʁ ʁudul], literally La Croix on Roudoule; Occitan: La Crotz de Rodola) is a commune in the Alpes-Maritimes department in southeastern France.

== Population ==
Historical population
Year	Pop.	±% p.a.
1968	91	—
1975	102	+1.64%
1982	69	−5.43%
1990	81	+2.02%
1999	97	+2.02%
2007	85	−1.64%
2012	94	+2.03%
2017	97	+0.63%
2023	96	−0.17%
Source: INSEE

== See also ==
- Communes of the Alpes-Maritimes department
