= Sigale =

Commune in Provence-Alpes-Côte d'Azur, France

Sigale Sigala (Occitan)
- Commune
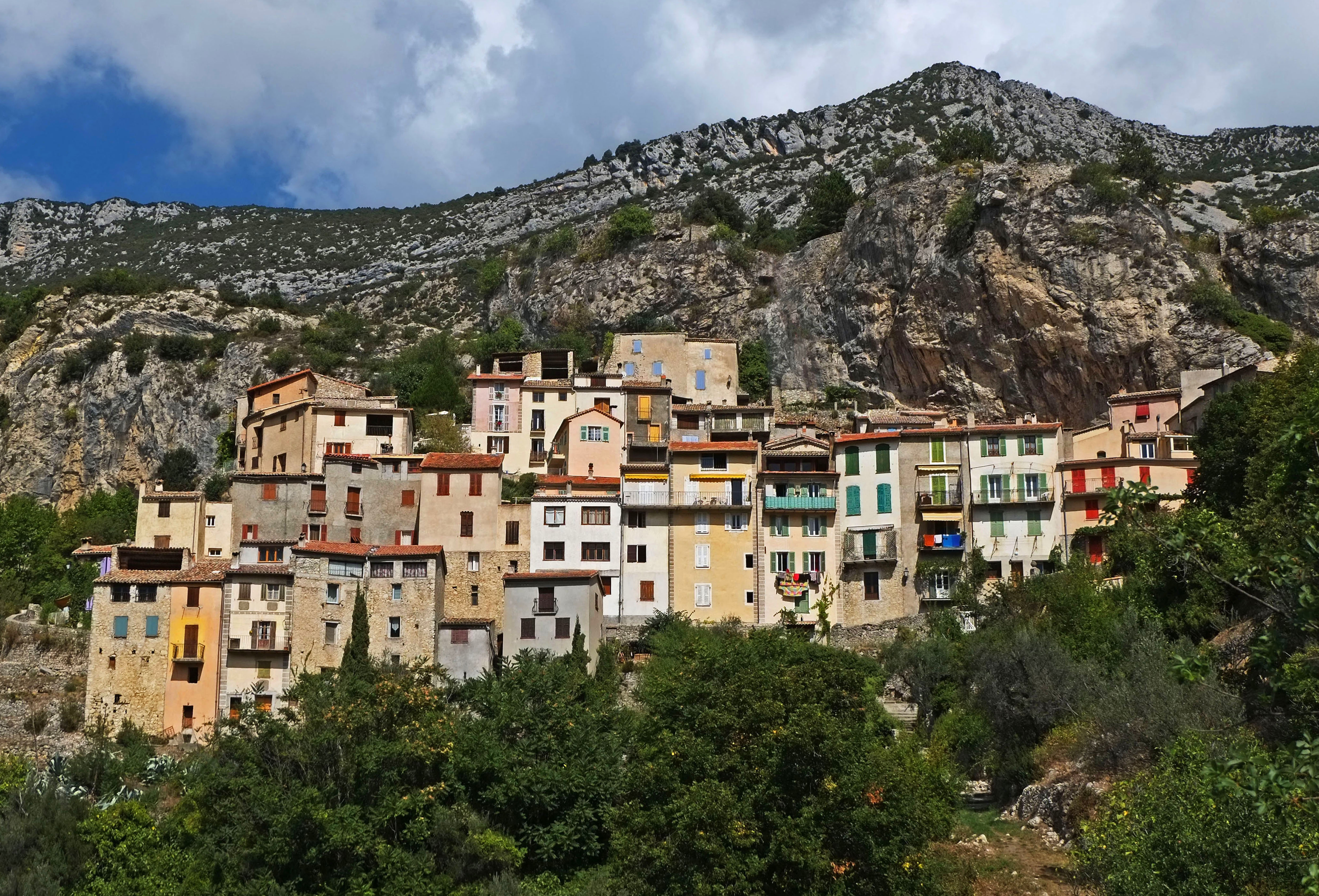
- A general view of Sigale

- Coat of arms
- Location of Sigale
- Location within France Location within Provence-Alpes-Côte d'Azur
- Coordinates: 43°52′24″N 6°57′55″E
- Country: France
- Region: Provence-Alpes-Côte d'Azur
- Department: Alpes-Maritimes
- Arrondissement: Nice
- Canton: Vence

Government
  - Mayor (2026–32): Arnaud Prigent
- Area^{1}: 5.62 km^{2} (2.17 sq mi)
- Elevation: 630 m (2,070 ft)
- Highest elevation: 1,108 m (3,635 ft)
- Lowest elevation: 327 m (1,073 ft)
- Population (2023): 204
  - Density: 36.3/km^{2} (94.0/sq mi)
- Time zone: UTC+01:00 (CET)
  - Summer (DST): UTC+02:00 (CEST)
- INSEE/Postal code: 06135 /06910
- ^{1} French Land Register data, which excludes lakes, ponds, glaciers > 1 km^{2} (0.386 sq mi or 247 acres) and river estuaries.

Sigale (French pronunciation: [siɡal]; Occitan: Sigala; Italian: Cigala, formerly) is a rural commune in the Alpes-Maritimes department in the southeastern Provence-Alpes-Côte d'Azur region in France. It is part of Préalpes d'Azur Regional Natural Park.

== Demographics ==
Historical population
| Year | Pop. | ±% p.a. |
|---|---|---|
| 1968 | 112 | — |
| 1975 | 155 | +4.75% |
| 1982 | 145 | −0.95% |
| 1990 | 160 | +1.24% |
| 1999 | 181 | +1.38% |
| 2007 | 208 | +1.75% |
| 2012 | 210 | +0.19% |
| 2017 | 198 | −1.17% |
| 2023 | 204 | +0.50% |
Source: INSEE

== See also ==
- Communes of the Alpes-Maritimes department
