= Massoins =

Commune in Provence-Alpes-Côte d'Azur, France

- Commune
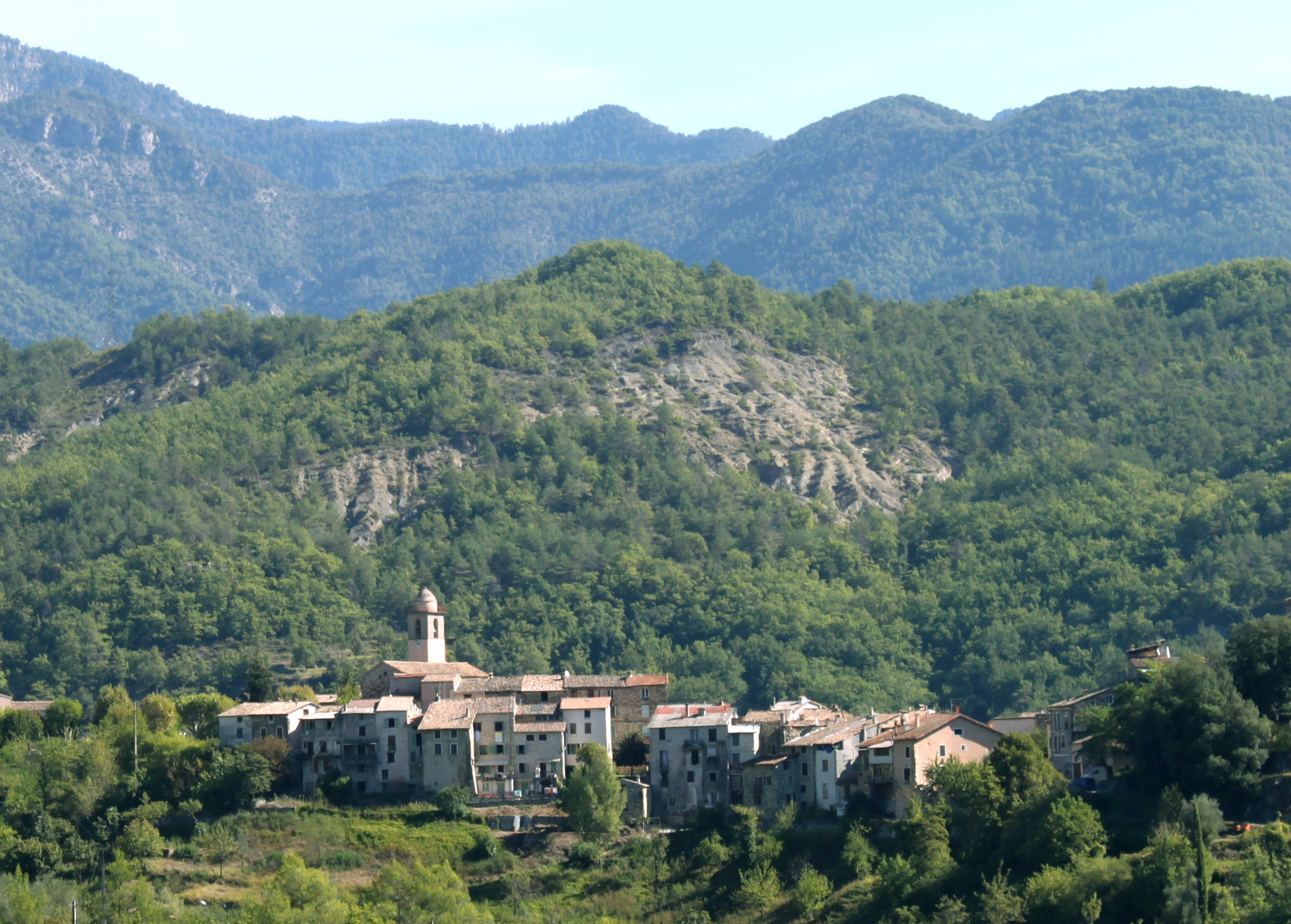
- A general view of the village

- Coat of arms
- Location of Massoins
- Location within France Location within Provence-Alpes-Côte d'Azur
- Coordinates: 43°56′33″N 7°07′32″E
- Country: France
- Region: Provence-Alpes-Côte d'Azur
- Department: Alpes-Maritimes
- Arrondissement: Nice
- Canton: Vence

Government
  - Mayor (2026–32): Philippe Baud
- Area^{1}: 12.13 km^{2} (4.68 sq mi)
- Highest elevation: 1,789 m (5,869 ft)
- Lowest elevation: 186 m (610 ft)
- Population (2023): 138
  - Density: 11.4/km^{2} (29.5/sq mi)
- Time zone: UTC+01:00 (CET)
  - Summer (DST): UTC+02:00 (CEST)
- INSEE/Postal code: 06082 /06710
- ^{1} French Land Register data, which excludes lakes, ponds, glaciers > 1 km^{2} (0.386 sq mi or 247 acres) and river estuaries.

Massoins (French pronunciation: [maswɛ̃]; Occitan: Massoin; Italian: Maissone) is a commune in the Alpes-Maritimes department in southeastern France.

== Population ==
Historical population
Year	Pop.	±% p.a.
1968	59	—
1975	42	−4.74%
1982	110	+14.75%
1990	227	+9.48%
1999	118	−7.01%
2007	129	+1.12%
2012	111	−2.96%
2017	102	−1.68%
2023	138	+5.17%
Source: INSEE

== See also ==
- Communes of the Alpes-Maritimes department
