= Toudon =

Commune in Provence-Alpes-Côte d'Azur, France

- Commune
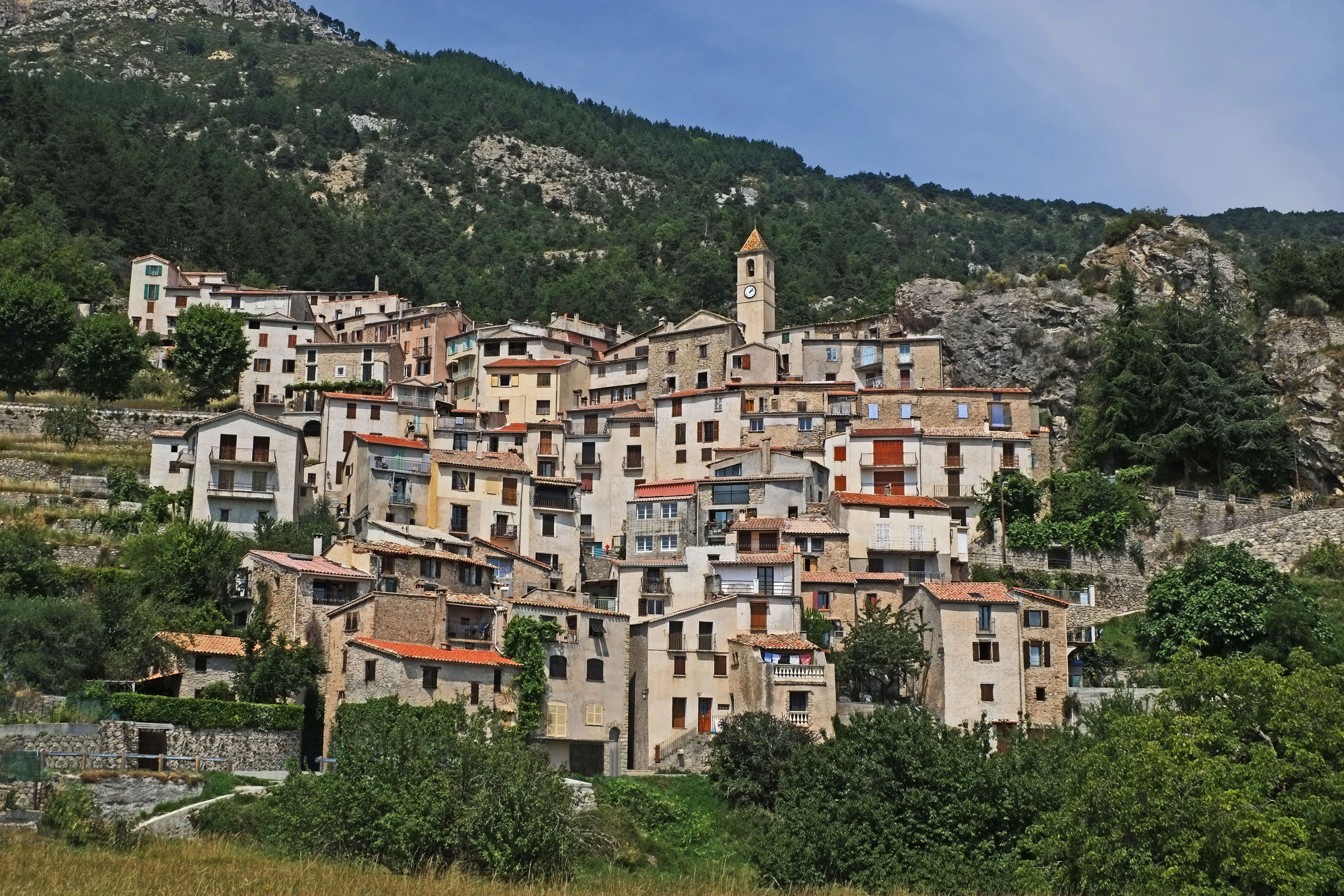
- A view of Toudon from below the village

- Coat of arms
- Location of Toudon
- Location within France Location within Provence-Alpes-Côte d'Azur
- Coordinates: 43°54′05″N 7°06′54″E
- Country: France
- Region: Provence-Alpes-Côte d'Azur
- Department: Alpes-Maritimes
- Arrondissement: Nice
- Canton: Vence

Government
  - Mayor (2026–32): Virginie Leclerc Escalier
- Area^{1}: 18.56 km^{2} (7.17 sq mi)
- Elevation: 1,000 m (3,300 ft)
- Highest elevation: 1,512 m (4,961 ft)
- Lowest elevation: 192 m (630 ft)
- Population (2023): 355
  - Density: 19.1/km^{2} (49.5/sq mi)
- Time zone: UTC+01:00 (CET)
  - Summer (DST): UTC+02:00 (CEST)
- INSEE/Postal code: 06141 /06830
- ^{1} French Land Register data, which excludes lakes, ponds, glaciers > 1 km^{2} (0.386 sq mi or 247 acres) and river estuaries.

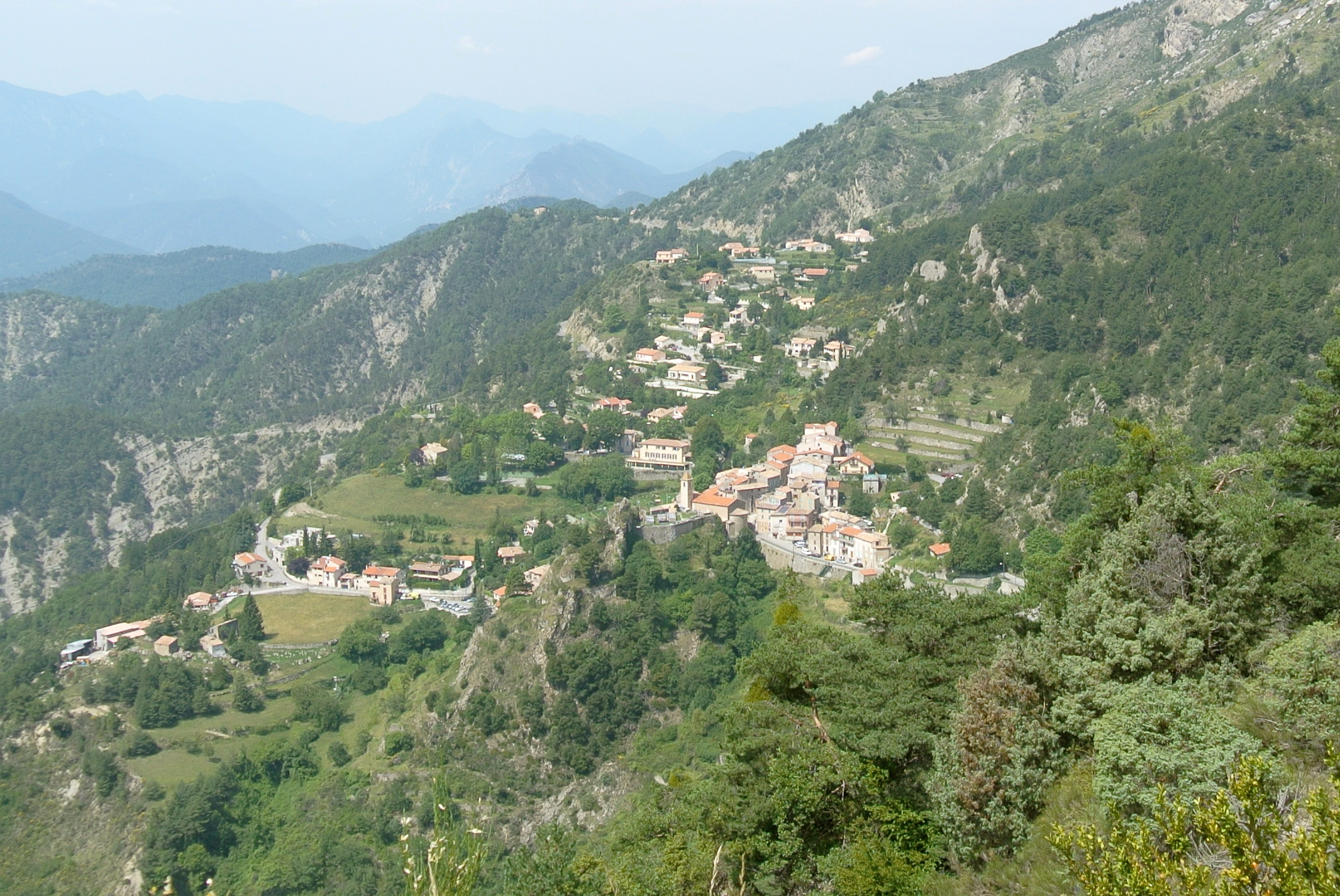
Toudon seen from the east

Toudon (French pronunciation: [tudɔ̃]; Occitan: Todon; Italian: Todone) is a commune in the Alpes-Maritimes department in southeastern France.

== Population ==
Historical population
Year	Pop.	±% p.a.
1968	170	—
1975	117	−5.20%
1982	117	+0.00%
1990	148	+2.98%
1999	227	+4.87%
2007	267	+2.05%
2012	317	+3.49%
2017	344	+1.65%
2023	355	+0.53%
Source: INSEE

== See also ==
- Communes of the Alpes-Maritimes department
