= Villars-sur-Var =

Commune in Provence-Alpes-Côte d'Azur, France

Villars-sur-Var Vilar de Var (Occitan)
- Commune
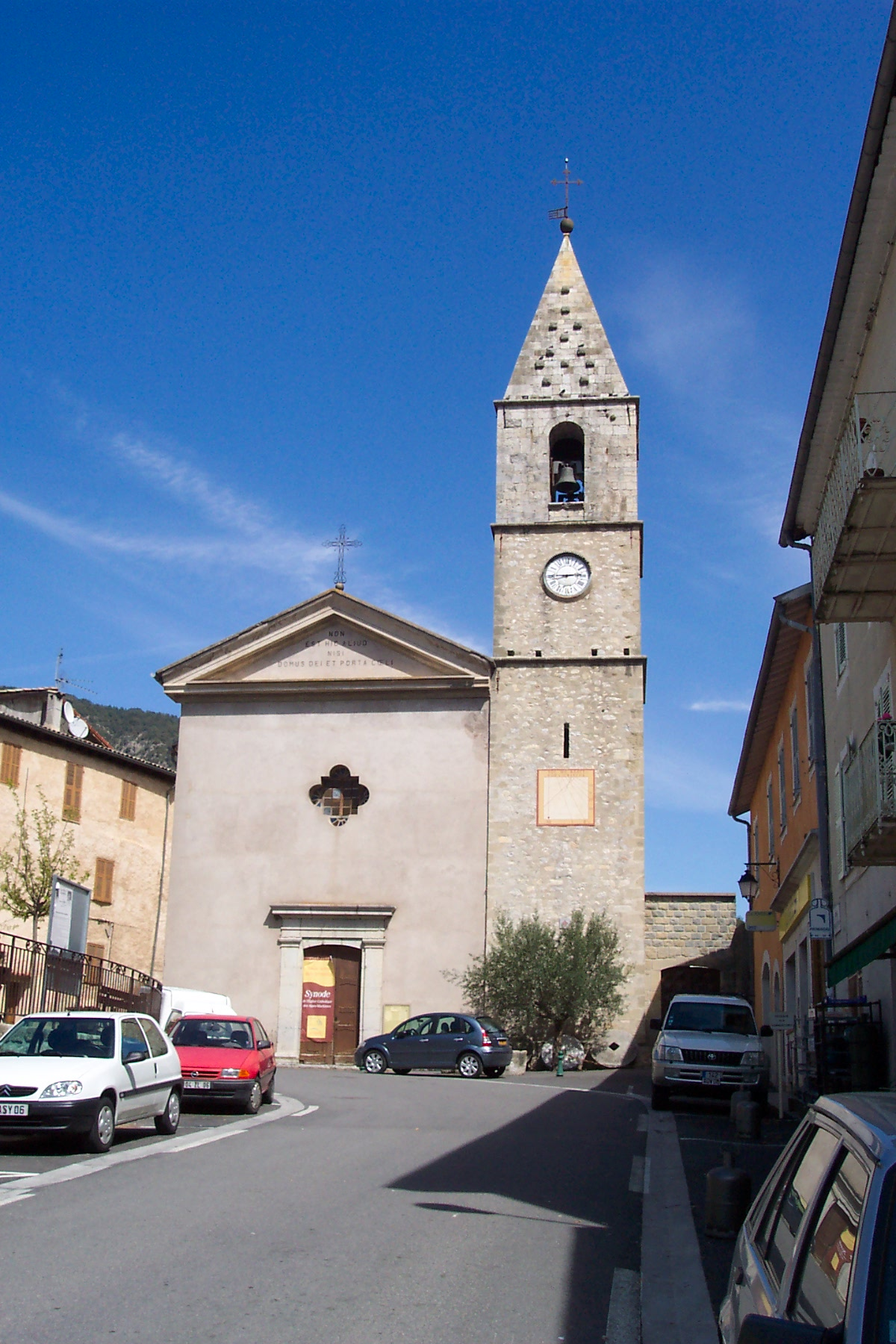
- The church of Saint-Jean-Baptiste in the historic village of Villars-sur-Var

- Coat of arms
- Location of Villars-sur-Var
- Location within France Location within Provence-Alpes-Côte d'Azur
- Coordinates: 43°56′17″N 7°05′52″E
- Country: France
- Region: Provence-Alpes-Côte d'Azur
- Department: Alpes-Maritimes
- Arrondissement: Nice
- Canton: Vence

Government
  - Mayor (2026–32): Bernard Briquetti
- Area^{1}: 25.27 km^{2} (9.76 sq mi)
- Elevation: 410 m (1,350 ft)
- Highest elevation: 1,803 m (5,915 ft)
- Lowest elevation: 239 m (784 ft)
- Population (2023): 780
  - Density: 31/km^{2} (80/sq mi)
- Time zone: UTC+01:00 (CET)
  - Summer (DST): UTC+02:00 (CEST)
- INSEE/Postal code: 06158 /06710
- ^{1} French Land Register data, which excludes lakes, ponds, glaciers > 1 km^{2} (0.386 sq mi or 247 acres) and river estuaries.

Villars-sur-Var (French pronunciation: [vilaʁ syʁ vaʁ], lit. "Villars-on-Var"; Occitan: Vilar de Var; Italian, formerly: Villar del Varo) is a commune in the Alpes-Maritimes department in the Provence-Alpes-Côte d'Azur region in Southeastern France.

== History ==
It was part of the historic County of Nice until 1860 as Villar del Varo.

== Demographics ==
Historical population
Year	Pop.	±% p.a.
1968	491	—
1975	383	−3.49%
1982	465	+2.81%
1990	507	+1.09%
1999	553	+0.97%
2007	650	+2.04%
2012	667	+0.52%
2017	761	+2.67%
2023	780	+0.41%
Source: INSEE

== Twin town ==
Villars-sur-Var has been twinned with Cherasco, Italy since 1981.

== See also ==
- Communes of the Alpes-Maritimes department
