= Entraunes =

Commune in Provence-Alpes-Côte d'Azur, France

- Commune
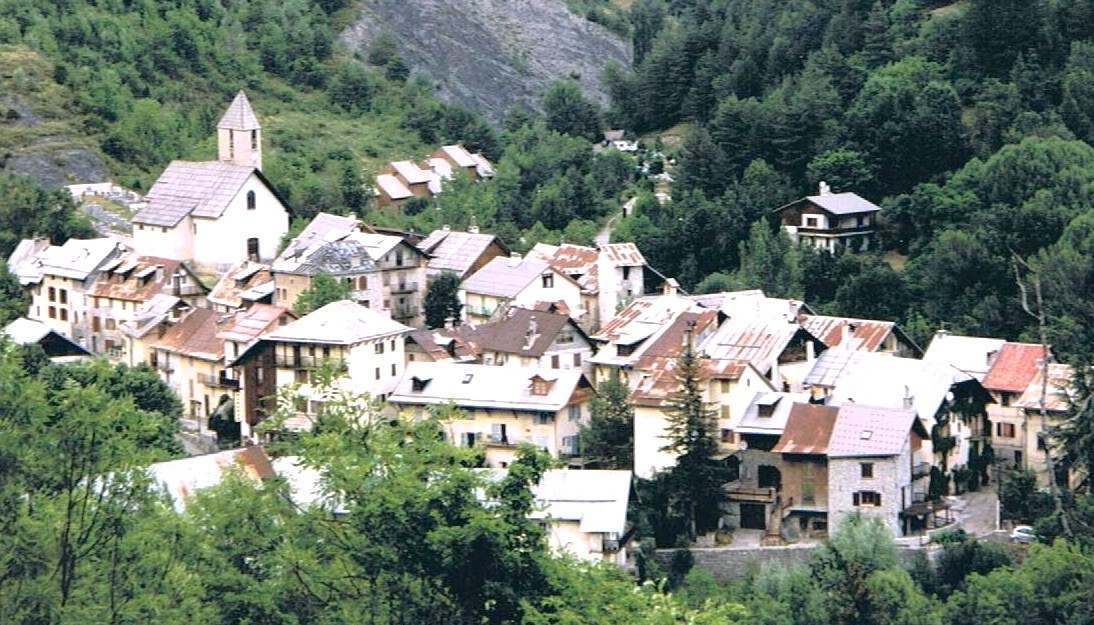
- A general view of the village

- Coat of arms
- Location of Entraunes
- Location within France Location within Provence-Alpes-Côte d'Azur
- Coordinates: 44°11′20″N 6°44′56″E
- Country: France
- Region: Provence-Alpes-Côte d'Azur
- Department: Alpes-Maritimes
- Arrondissement: Nice
- Canton: Vence

Government
  - Mayor (2026–32): Pierre Tardieu
- Area^{1}: 81.45 km^{2} (31.45 sq mi)
- Elevation: 1,260 m (4,130 ft)
- Highest elevation: 2,880 m (9,450 ft)
- Lowest elevation: 1,100 m (3,600 ft)
- Population (2023): 124
  - Density: 1.52/km^{2} (3.94/sq mi)
- Time zone: UTC+01:00 (CET)
  - Summer (DST): UTC+02:00 (CEST)
- INSEE/Postal code: 06056 /06470
- ^{1} French Land Register data, which excludes lakes, ponds, glaciers > 1 km^{2} (0.386 sq mi or 247 acres) and river estuaries.

Entraunes (French pronunciation: [ɑ̃tʁon]; Occitan: Entraunas) is a commune in the Alpes-Maritimes department in southeastern France.

== Location ==
Entraunes lies 110 km northwest of Nice where the Var flows into the Mediterranean. It lies in the northwest corner of Alpes-Maritimes next to the department of Alpes-de-Haute-Provence. Since 1979, it has been part of the Parc National du Mercantour.

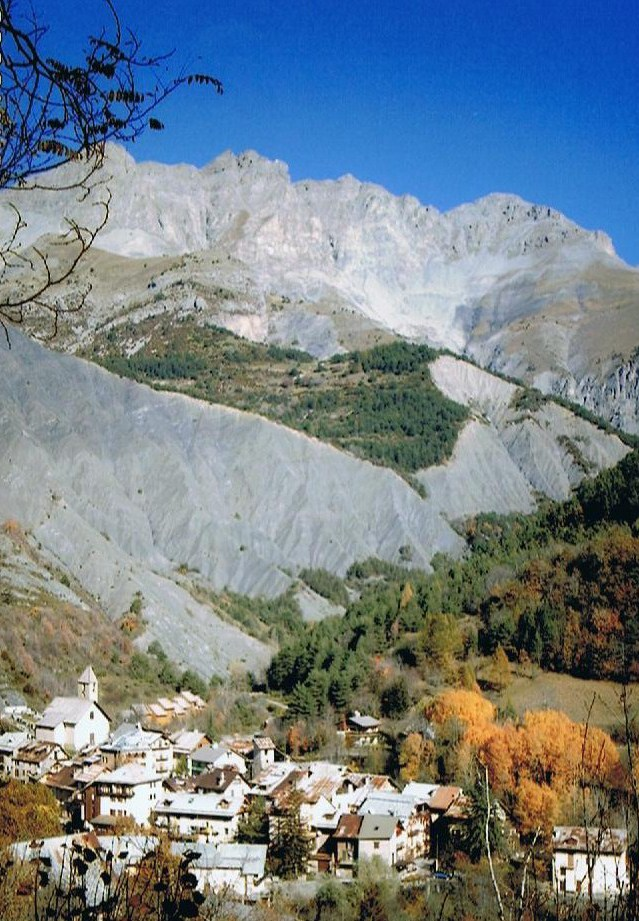
Entraunes dominated by the Roche Grande

== Geography ==
The Var has its source in the commune at an elevation of 1790 m at the foot of the Estenc Glacier.

The western limit of the commune is the line of peaks that separated the territory of the House of Savoie from France on the west.

== Climate ==
The climate is high-elevation Mediterranean. Annual snowfall averages 1.80 m with 20 days of snowfall annually. Rainfall averages 1384 mm, with heavy rains in the fall and drought in the summer. Up to 1600 m, the terrain is forested, and above that, are alpine meadows up to the rocky peaks.

== Population ==
Historical population
Year	Pop.	±% p.a.
1968	103	—
1975	122	+2.45%
1982	121	−0.12%
1990	127	+0.61%
1999	125	−0.18%
2007	128	+0.30%
2012	120	−1.28%
2017	138	+2.83%
2023	124	−1.77%
Source: INSEE

== See also ==
- Communes of the Alpes-Maritimes department
