= Tournefort, Alpes-Maritimes =

Commune in Provence-Alpes-Côte d'Azur, France

Tournefort
- Commune
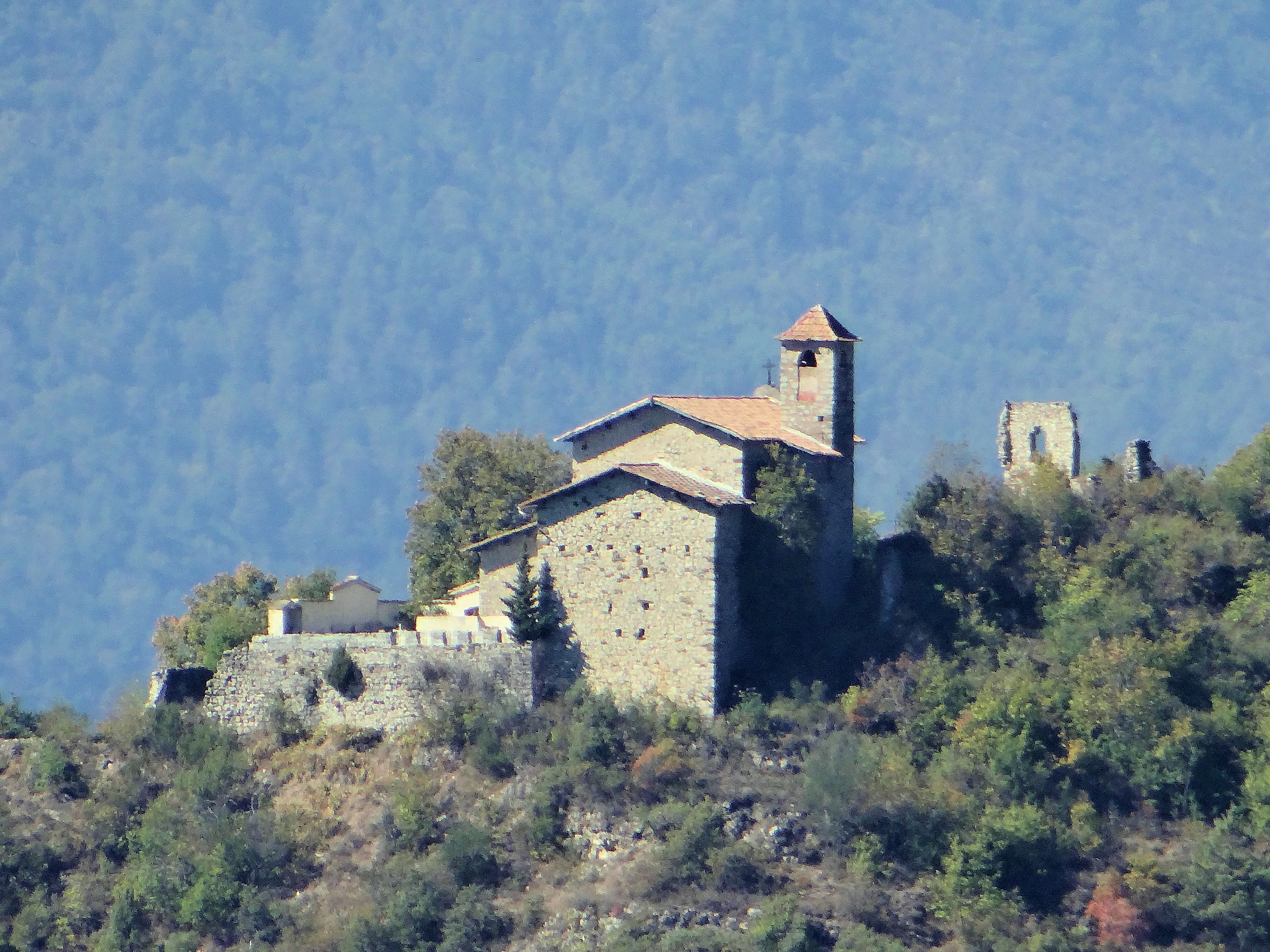
- The church of the old village and adjacent ruins

- Coat of arms
- Location of Tournefort
- Location within France Location within Provence-Alpes-Côte d'Azur
- Coordinates: 43°56′51″N 7°09′06″E
- Country: France
- Region: Provence-Alpes-Côte d'Azur
- Department: Alpes-Maritimes
- Arrondissement: Nice
- Canton: Vence
- Intercommunality: Métropole Nice Côte d'Azur

Government
  - Mayor (2026–32): Murielle Molinari
- Area^{1}: 10.13 km^{2} (3.91 sq mi)
- Elevation: 630 m (2,070 ft)
- Highest elevation: 1,304 m (4,278 ft)
- Lowest elevation: 171 m (561 ft)
- Population (2023): 147
  - Density: 14.5/km^{2} (37.6/sq mi)
- Time zone: UTC+01:00 (CET)
  - Summer (DST): UTC+02:00 (CEST)
- INSEE/Postal code: 06146 /06710
- ^{1} French Land Register data, which excludes lakes, ponds, glaciers > 1 km^{2} (0.386 sq mi or 247 acres) and river estuaries.

Tournefort (Italian: Tornaforte) is a commune in the Alpes-Maritimes department in southeastern France.

== Population ==
Historical population
Year	Pop.	±% p.a.
1968	37	—
1975	46	+3.16%
1982	46	+0.00%
1990	93	+9.20%
1999	143	+4.90%
2007	154	+0.93%
2012	140	−1.89%
2017	167	+3.59%
2023	147	−2.10%
Source: INSEE

== See also ==
- Communes of the Alpes-Maritimes department
