= Gilette =

Administrative division in Provence-Alpes-Côte d'Azur, France

- Commune
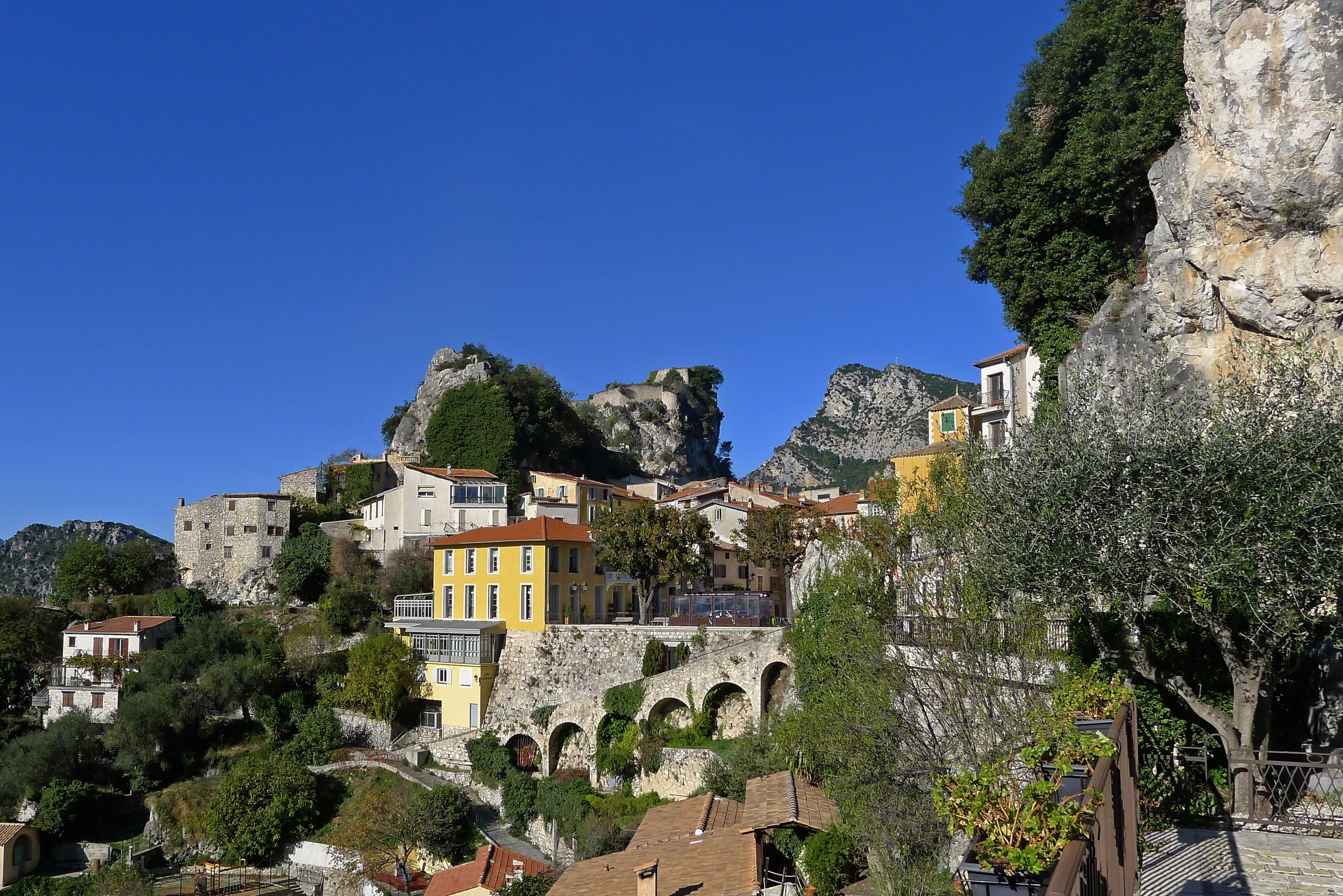
- A view of the village from the bridge of Charles-Albert

- Coat of arms
- Location of Gilette
- Location within France Location within Provence-Alpes-Côte d'Azur
- Coordinates: 43°51′01″N 7°09′52″E
- Country: France
- Region: Provence-Alpes-Côte d'Azur
- Department: Alpes-Maritimes
- Arrondissement: Nice
- Canton: Vence
- Intercommunality: Métropole Nice Côte d'Azur

Government
  - Mayor (2026–32): Jean-Claude Niel
- Area^{1}: 10.18 km^{2} (3.93 sq mi)
- Elevation: 459 m (1,506 ft)
- Highest elevation: 808 m (2,651 ft)
- Lowest elevation: 108 m (354 ft)
- Population (2023): 1,627
  - Density: 159.8/km^{2} (413.9/sq mi)
- Time zone: UTC+01:00 (CET)
  - Summer (DST): UTC+02:00 (CEST)
- INSEE/Postal code: 06066 /06830
- ^{1} French Land Register data, which excludes lakes, ponds, glaciers > 1 km^{2} (0.386 sq mi or 247 acres) and river estuaries.

Gilette (French pronunciation: [ʒilɛt]; Occitan: Gileta; Italian: Giletta) is a commune in the Alpes-Maritimes department in southeastern France.

== Population ==
Historical population
Year	Pop.	±% p.a.
1968	521	—
1975	504	−0.47%
1982	618	+2.96%
1990	1,024	+6.52%
1999	1,254	+2.28%
2007	1,449	+1.82%
2012	1,516	+0.91%
2017	1,596	+1.03%
2023	1,627	+0.32%
Source: INSEE

The inhabitants are called Gilettois in French.

== See also ==
- Communes of the Alpes-Maritimes department
