= Raton (river) =

- Location within France Location within Provence-Alpes-Côte d'Azur

Location
- Country: France

Physical characteristics
- Mouth
  - location: Cians
  - coordinates: 44°2′23″N 6°58′35″E
- Length: 6.1 km (3.8 mi)

Basin features
- Progression: Cians→ Var→ Mediterranean Sea

The Raton (French pronunciation: [ʁatɔ̃]) is a short mountain river that flows through the Alpes-Maritimes department of southeastern France. It is 6.1 km (3.8 mi) long. It flows into the Cians north of Rigaud.

It flows from west to east along the following communes:

- north side: Guillaumes, Beuil
- south side: Auvare, Puget-Rostang, Rigaud
