= Cianavelle =

- Location within France Location within Provence-Alpes-Côte d'Azur

Location
- Country: France

Physical characteristics
- Mouth
  - location: Cians
  - coordinates: 43°59′57″N 6°59′25″E
- Length: 8.0 km (5.0 mi)

Basin features
- Progression: Cians→ Var→ Mediterranean Sea

The Cianavelle is a short mountain river that flows through the Alpes-Maritimes department of southeastern France. It flows into the Cians near Rigaud. It is 8.0 km (5.0 mi) long.

The Cianavelle flows through the communes of Auvare, Puget-Rostang, and Rigaud.
