= Beuil =

Commune in Provence-Alpes-Côte d'Azur, France

- Commune
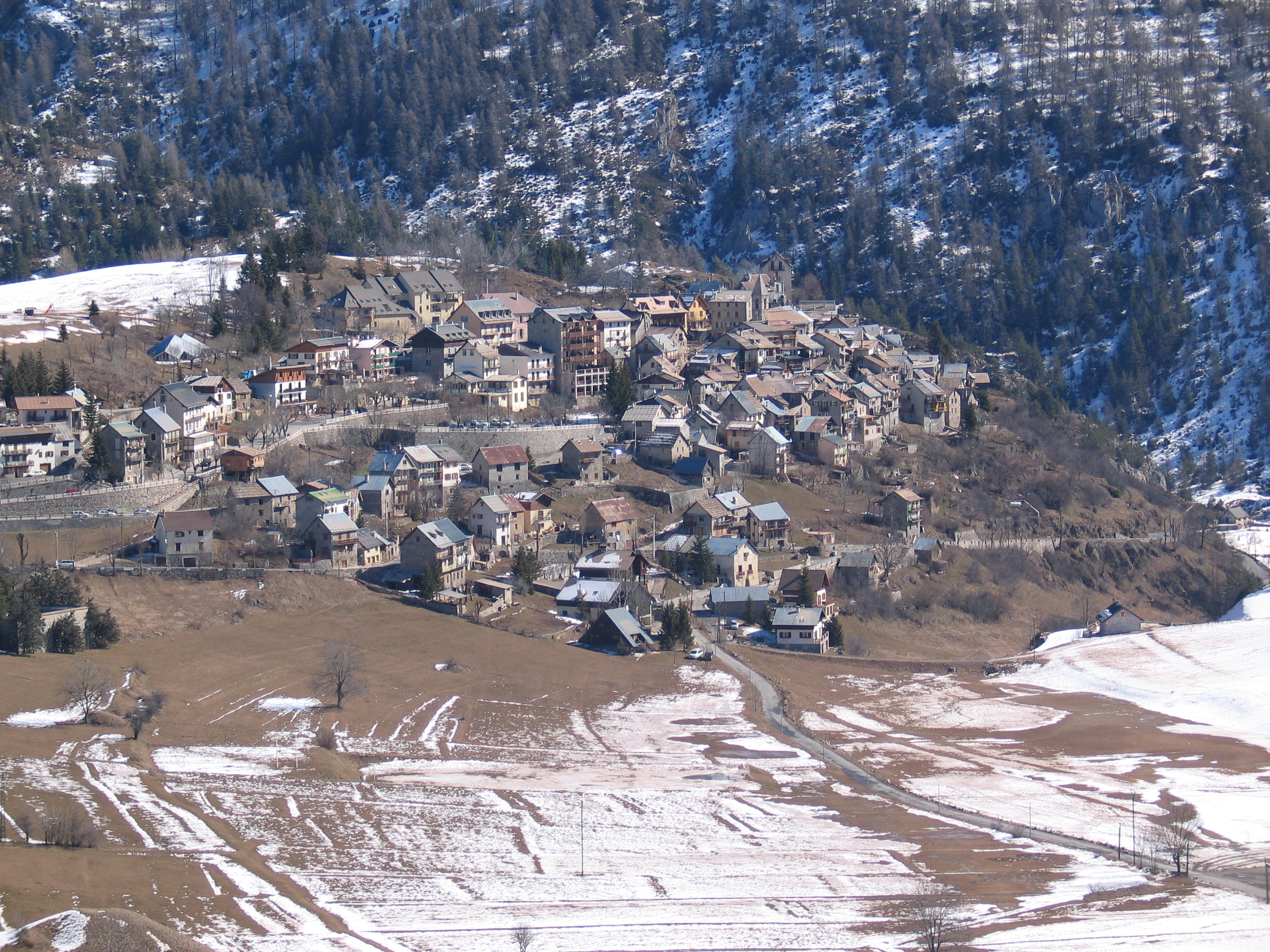
- A general view of the village, from above

- Coat of arms
- Location of Beuil
- Location within France Location within Provence-Alpes-Côte d'Azur
- Coordinates: 44°05′45″N 6°59′18″E
- Country: France
- Region: Provence-Alpes-Côte d'Azur
- Department: Alpes-Maritimes
- Arrondissement: Nice
- Canton: Vence
- Intercommunality: Alpes d'Azur

Government
  - Mayor (2026–32): Nicolas Donadey
- Area^{1}: 75.65 km^{2} (29.21 sq mi)
- Highest elevation: 2,815 m (9,236 ft)
- Lowest elevation: 1,040 m (3,410 ft)
- Population (2023): 483
  - Density: 6.38/km^{2} (16.5/sq mi)
- Demonym: Beuillois
- Time zone: UTC+01:00 (CET)
  - Summer (DST): UTC+02:00 (CEST)
- INSEE/Postal code: 06016 /06470
- ^{1} French Land Register data, which excludes lakes, ponds, glaciers > 1 km^{2} (0.386 sq mi or 247 acres) and river estuaries.

Beuil (French pronunciation: [bœj]; Occitan: Buelh; Italian: Boglio) is a commune in the Alpes-Maritimes department in southeastern France.

== Geography ==
Beuil is a village located in the Maritime Alps, 78 km (48 mi) away from Nice. It is the gateway to the Mercantour National Park. A stop-off in the red-rocked Gorges of the river Cians and the Gorges de Daluis. The commune is traversed by the river Raton.

The Valberg ski resort is, in part, located on this town.

== Arms ==

The blazon of the arms is as follows:

"Or, a star with sixteen rays Gules."

== Population ==
Historical population
Year	Pop.	±% p.a.
1968	326	—
1975	320	−0.27%
1982	313	−0.32%
1990	330	+0.66%
1999	334	+0.13%
2007	491	+4.93%
2012	503	+0.48%
2017	525	+0.86%
2023	483	−1.38%
Source: INSEE

== See also ==
- Communes of the Alpes-Maritimes department
