= Ouvrage Rimplas =

Fortification near Rimplas, Alpes-Maritimes, France

- Part of Maginot Line, Alpine Line
- Southeast France
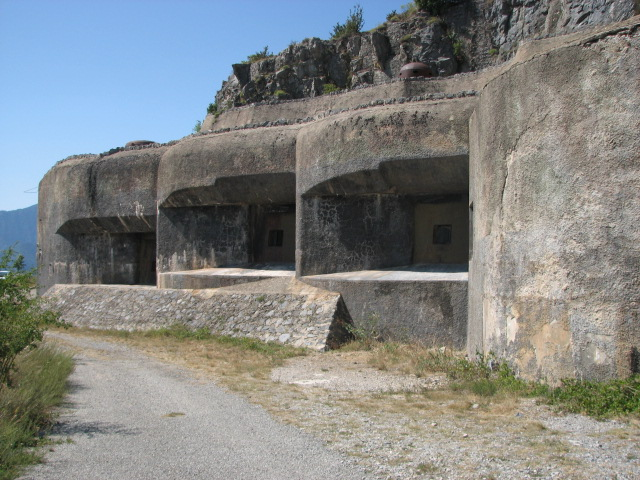
- Rimplas Block 5

Site information
- Owner: General Council of the Alpes-Maritimes
- Controlled by: France
- Open to the public: Yes (on occasion)

Location
- Coordinates: 44.06005°N 7.1284°E

Site history
- Built: 1928
- Built by: CORF
- In use: Preserved
- Materials: Concrete, steel, rock excavation
- Battles/wars: Italian invasion of France, Operation Dragoon

Ouvrage Rimplas is a work (gros ouvrage) of the Maginot Line's Alpine extension, the Alpine Line, known also as the Little Maginot Line. The ouvrage consists of one entry block, two infantry blocks and three artillery blocks at an altitude of 986 metres (3,235 ft). This ouvrage was the first ouvrage of any portion of the Maginot Line to start construction in 1928. The ouvrage features an aerial tram entrance.

Located on a height to the southwest of Rimplas, the position was originally called Ouvrage de la Madeleine. While it was a prototype for later work, it is not entirely typical of Maginot fortifications, with large expanses of wall armored with 20 cm steel plate and other sections overlaid with stone masonry. The construction encountered problems with soil consistency and water infiltration. The underground portion of the ouvrage, containing the ammunition magazines, living quarters, command spaces, generating plant and communication galleries between the combat blocks covers three levels. Rimplas stands on a prominent height above the Tinée and Valdeblore valleys before their streams join to form the river Var. It is supported by the petits ouvrages of Fressinéa and Valdeblore, all planned to control the approaches to Nice along the Var.

Work began in November 1930 and was completed in April 1934, initially performed by a contractor named Faraut and completed by Contesso, at a cost of 34.2 million francs, including 1.7 million francs for the aerial tram. The final cost was four times the initial estimate, making Rimplas the second most expensive position (after Monte Grosso) in the Alpine Line. Difficulties with the friable nature of the rock required that some rock faces be concreted or covered with masonry to stabilize them. The project went through three major design changes before completion. The ouvrage was fully equipped and operational in August 1937. In 1940 the position was commanded by Captain Toussaint.

== Description ==
- Block 1 (artillery): one grenade launcher cloche, two heavy twin machine gun embrasures and one 81mm mortar embrasure.
- Block 2 (infantry): one machine gun embrasure.
- Block 3 (infantry): one machine gun cloche and one heavy twin machine gun embrasure.
- Block 4 (artillery): one observation cloche, one heavy twin machine gun cloche and three 75mm gun embrasures, covering the Tinée valley.
- Block 5 (artillery): one observation cloche, one machine gun cloche and three 75mm gun embrasures, covering the Valdeblore valley.

Rimplas was accessed by a single-cable aerial tram with a length of 872 metres (2,861 ft) and a rise of 602 metres (1,975 ft), leading directly into its own entrance block. The underground galleries were unusually laid out on two levels, with ammunition on the lower level and accommodations on the upper.

Rimplas was associated with the following avant-postes:

- Valabres Nord (Principal), built 1932 along the Tinée road beyond Fressinéa 44°07′48.78″N 07°05′57.22″E with three blocks and 20 men. Block 1, entry, Block 2, along the road with one Parmat cloche containing a machine gun, and Block 3, a machine gun casemate. Small galleries extend under the road, and a small, separate block called Valabres Sud covers what was once a side road (now the main road) with a garrison of 17 men and a machine gun.

Seven small observation posts reported to Rimplas, including Caire-Gros, Pinéa, Fraccia-Roure Haut and Fraccia-Roure Bas.

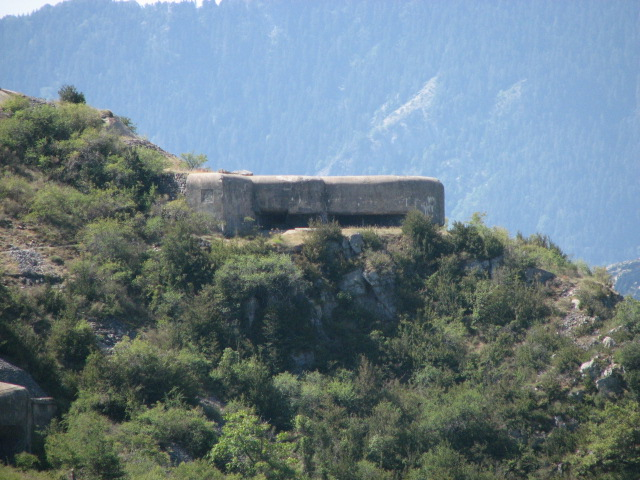
Block B1

== History ==
Rimplas took a small part in France's resistance to the Italian invasion of France in June 1940 against the Italian Livorno Division, which crossed the frontier at Isola. The Italians were stopped at Doanes, and Rimplas took no direct part in the fighting. Some of Rimplas' armament was confiscated by Italian forces following the armistice of 25 June 1940. It was partly re-armed in 1947 and maintained until 1972, when it was sold to the commune of Rimplas. It was then used to grow mushrooms, the resultant humidity causing moisture damage. Ownership was transferred to the General Council of the Alpes-Maritimes with plans to make Rimplas a "place of memory." "Les Amis de l’Ouvrage Maginot de la Madeleine" undertook restoration work and the ouvrage is open during summer months,

== See also ==
- List of Alpine Line ouvrages

== Bibliography ==
- Allcorn, William. The Maginot Line 1928–45. Oxford: Osprey Publishing, 2003. ISBN 1-84176-646-1
- Kaufmann, J.E. and Kaufmann, H.W. Fortress France: The Maginot Line and French Defenses in World War II, Stackpole Books, 2006. ISBN 0-275-98345-5
- Kaufmann, J.E., Kaufmann, H.W., Jancovič-Potočnik, A. and Lang, P. The Maginot Line: History and Guide, Pen and Sword, 2011. ISBN 978-1-84884-068-3
- Mary, Jean-Yves; Hohnadel, Alain; Sicard, Jacques. Hommes et Ouvrages de la Ligne Maginot, Tome 1. Paris, Histoire & Collections, 2001. ISBN 2-908182-88-2 (in French)
- Mary, Jean-Yves; Hohnadel, Alain; Sicard, Jacques. Hommes et Ouvrages de la Ligne Maginot, Tome 4 – La fortification alpine. Paris, Histoire & Collections, 2009. ISBN 978-2-915239-46-1 (in French)
- Mary, Jean-Yves; Hohnadel, Alain; Sicard, Jacques. Hommes et Ouvrages de la Ligne Maginot, Tome 5. Paris, Histoire & Collections, 2009. ISBN 978-2-35250-127-5 (in French)
