= Barlatte =

- Location within France Location within Provence-Alpes-Côte d'Azur

Location
- Country: France

Physical characteristics
- Source
  - location: Maritime Alps
- Mouth
  - location: Var
  - coordinates: 44°6′23″N 6°50′10″E
- Length: 13.5 km (8.4 mi)

Basin features
- Progression: Var→ Mediterranean Sea

The Barlatte (French pronunciation: [baʁlat]) is a short mountain river that flows through the Alpes-Maritimes department of southeastern France. It is 13.5 km (8.4 mi) long. Its source is in the Maritime Alps, and it flows into the river Var near Guillaumes.
