= Bourdous =

- Location within France Location within Provence-Alpes-Côte d'Azur

Location
- Country: France

Physical characteristics
- Mouth
  - location: Var
  - coordinates: 44°11′7″N 6°44′59″E
- Length: 7.3 km (4.5 mi)

Basin features
- Progression: Var→ Mediterranean Sea

The Bourdous is a short mountain river that flows through the Alpes-Maritimes department of southeastern France. It is 7.3 km (4.5 mi) long. Its source is in the Maritime Alps, and it flows into the river Var in Entraunes.
