= Cians =

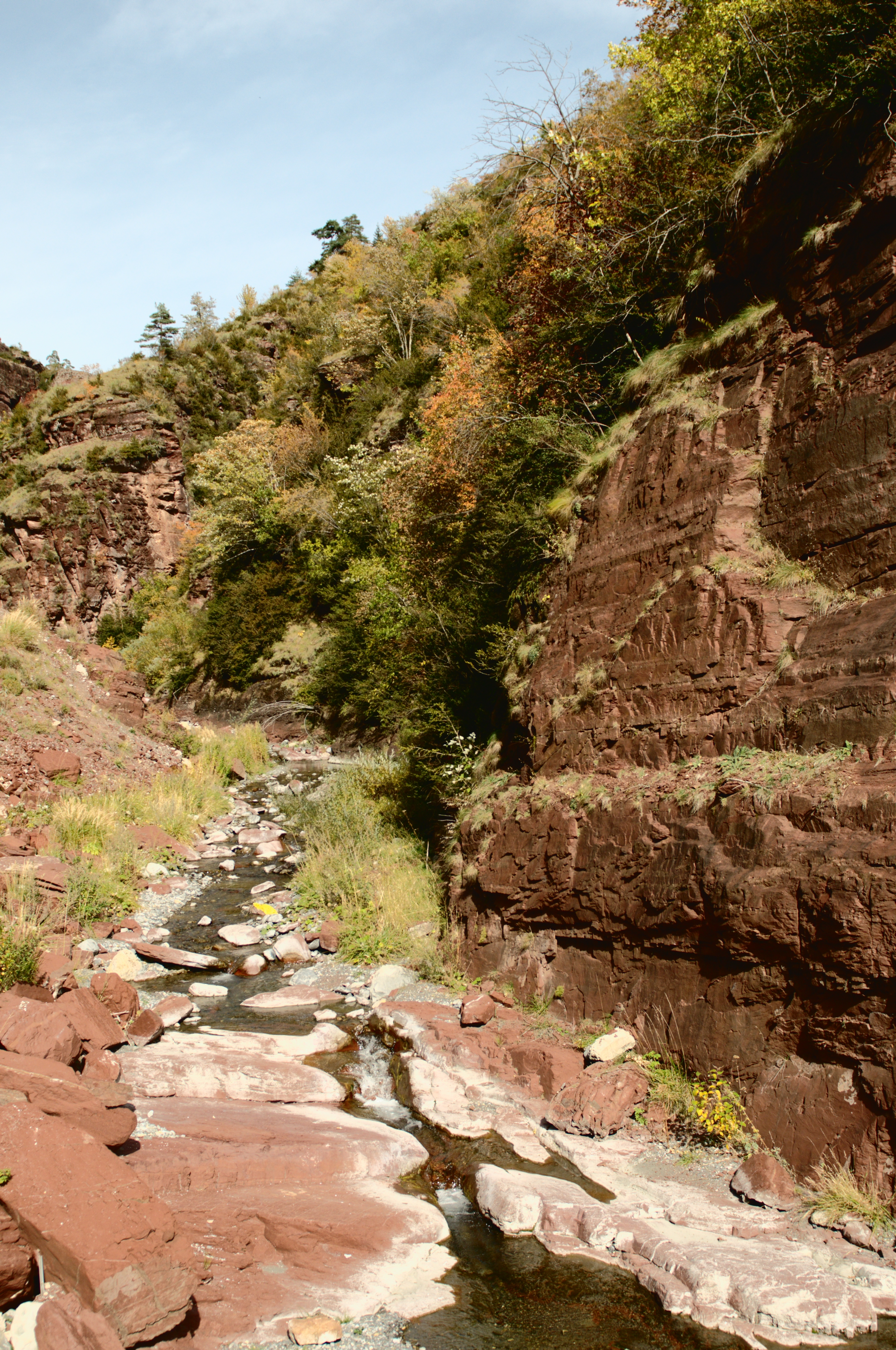
- Cians Gorge

- Location within France Location within Provence-Alpes-Côte d'Azur

Location
- Country: France

Physical characteristics
- Source
  - location: Maritime Alps
  - coordinates: 44°7′29″N 7°0′12″E
- Mouth: Var
  - coordinates: 43°56′50″N 6°59′17″E
- Length: 25 km (16 mi)
- Basin size: 166 km^{2} (64 sq mi)

Basin features
- Progression: Var→ Mediterranean Sea

The Cians is a mountain river that flows through the Alpes-Maritimes department of southeastern France. It is 25.3 kilometres (15 3/4 miles) long. Its drainage basin is 166 km^{2} (64 sq mi). Its source is in the mountains north of Beuil, and it flows into the Var in Touët-sur-Var.

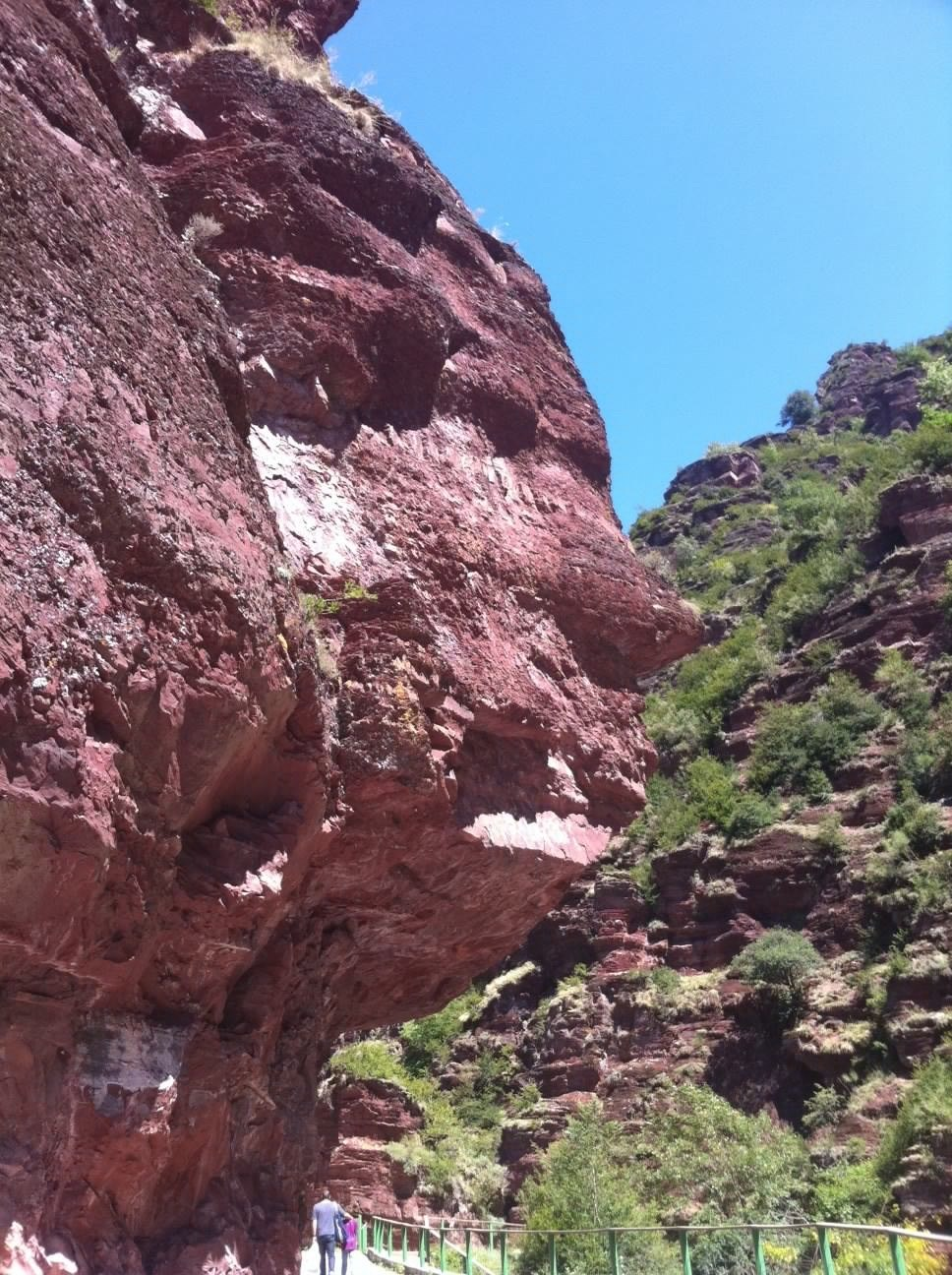
The "Grimacing human face": some strange pareidolia in the Gorges du Cians

The Cians flows through the following communes:

- Beuil, Rigaud, Pierlas, Thiéry, Touët-sur-Var.

This river runs through a canyon of red shale, named "Gorges du Cians", with formations of eroded rock.

== Tributaries ==
- Raton
- Cianavelle
