= Pierlas =

Commune in Provence-Alpes-Côte d'Azur, France

- Commune
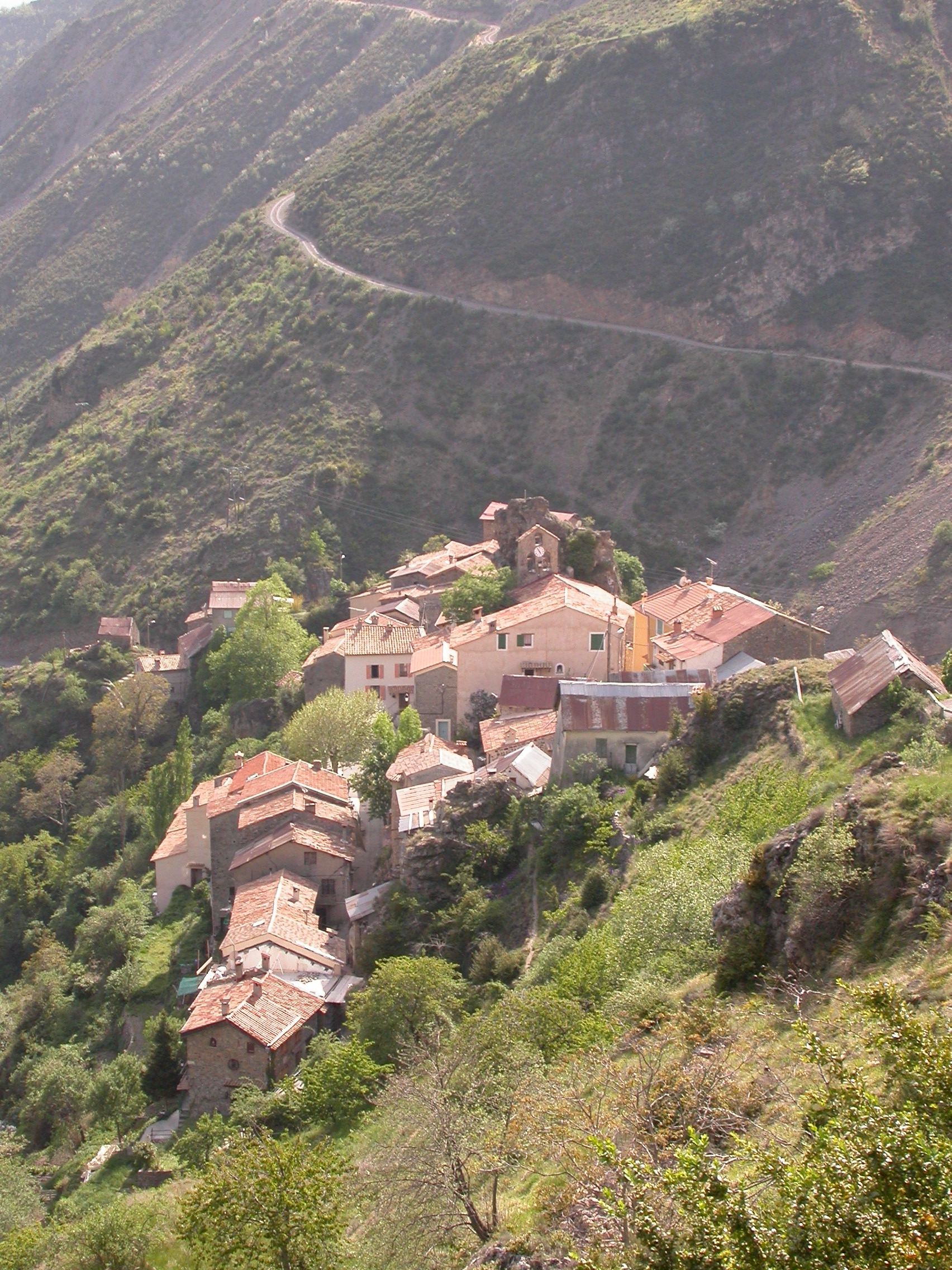
- The village of Pierlas

- Coat of arms
- Location of Pierlas
- Location within France Location within Provence-Alpes-Côte d'Azur
- Coordinates: 44°01′57″N 7°02′10″E
- Country: France
- Region: Provence-Alpes-Côte d'Azur
- Department: Alpes-Maritimes
- Arrondissement: Nice
- Canton: Vence

Government
  - Mayor (2026–32): Gilbert Martinelli
- Area^{1}: 31.31 km^{2} (12.09 sq mi)
- Elevation: 900 m (3,000 ft)
- Highest elevation: 2,106 m (6,909 ft)
- Lowest elevation: 560 m (1,840 ft)
- Population (2023): 98
  - Density: 3.1/km^{2} (8.1/sq mi)
- Demonym: Pierlassois
- Time zone: UTC+01:00 (CET)
  - Summer (DST): UTC+02:00 (CEST)
- INSEE/Postal code: 06096 /06260
- ^{1} French Land Register data, which excludes lakes, ponds, glaciers > 1 km^{2} (0.386 sq mi or 247 acres) and river estuaries.

Pierlas (French pronunciation: [pjɛʁlas]; Occitan: Pierlàs; Italian: Pierlasso) is a commune in the Alpes-Maritimes department in southeastern France.

== Geography ==
The commune is traversed by the river Cians.

== Population ==
Historical population
Year	Pop.	±% p.a.
1968	62	—
1975	67	+1.11%
1982	73	+1.23%
1990	115	+5.85%
1999	84	−3.43%
2007	114	+3.89%
2012	89	−4.83%
2017	103	+2.96%
2023	98	−0.83%
Source: INSEE

== See also ==
- Communes of the Alpes-Maritimes department
