= Rigaud, Alpes-Maritimes =

Commune in Provence-Alpes-Côte d'Azur, France

Rigaud
- Commune
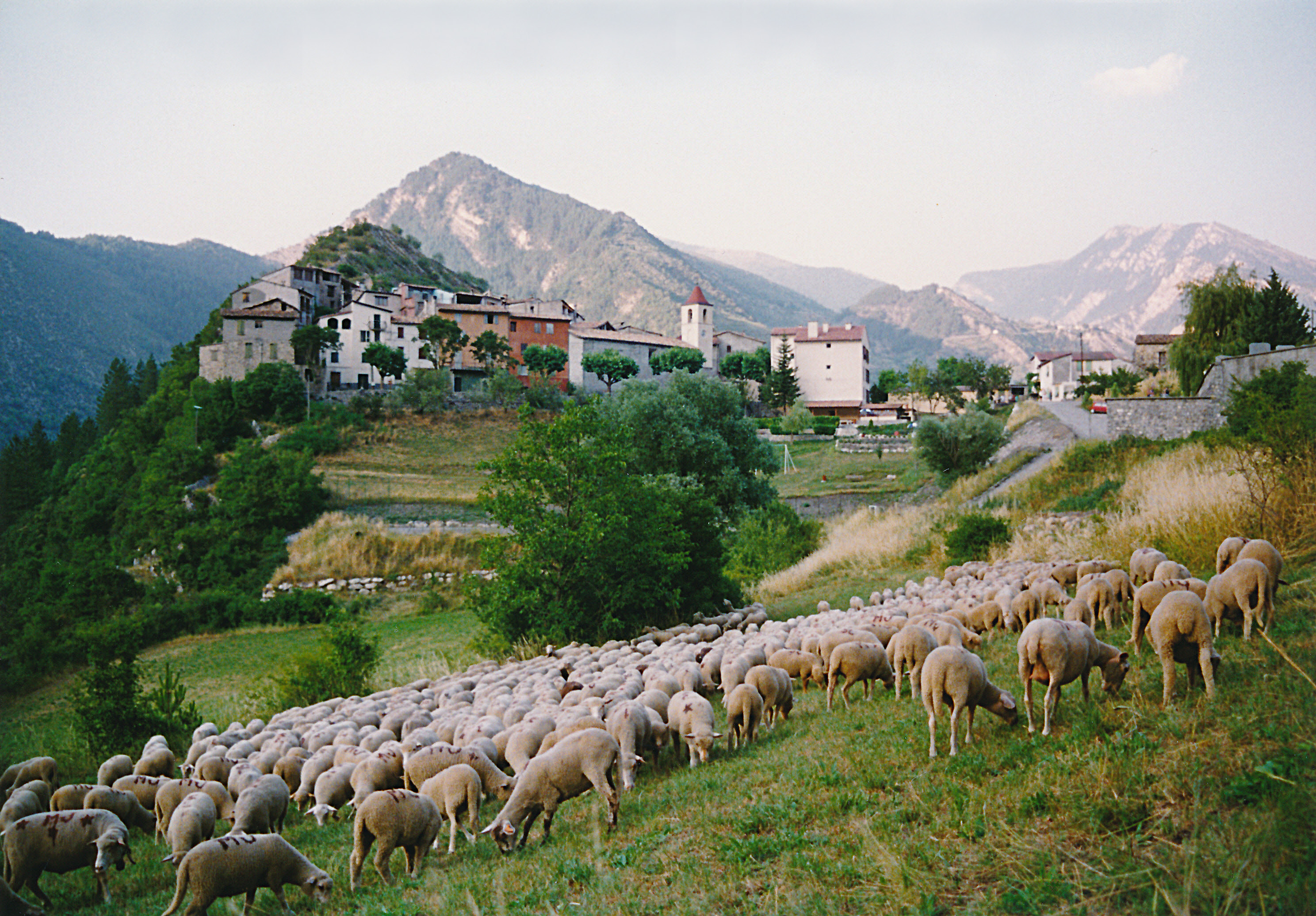
- A flock of sheep outside Rigaud village

- Coat of arms
- Location of Rigaud
- Location within France Location within Provence-Alpes-Côte d'Azur
- Coordinates: 43°59′30″N 6°59′31″E
- Country: France
- Region: Provence-Alpes-Côte d'Azur
- Department: Alpes-Maritimes
- Arrondissement: Nice
- Canton: Vence

Government
  - Mayor (2026–32): Francis Moya
- Area^{1}: 32.54 km^{2} (12.56 sq mi)
- Elevation: 753 m (2,470 ft)
- Highest elevation: 1,907 m (6,257 ft)
- Lowest elevation: 333 m (1,093 ft)
- Population (2023): 165
  - Density: 5.07/km^{2} (13.1/sq mi)
- Time zone: UTC+01:00 (CET)
  - Summer (DST): UTC+02:00 (CEST)
- INSEE/Postal code: 06101 /06260
- ^{1} French Land Register data, which excludes lakes, ponds, glaciers > 1 km^{2} (0.386 sq mi or 247 acres) and river estuaries.

Rigaud (French pronunciation: [ʁiɡo]; Italian: Rigaudo) is a commune in the Alpes-Maritimes department in southeastern France.

== Geography ==
The commune is traversed by the rivers Cians, Cianavelle and Raton.

== Population ==
Historical population
Year	Pop.	±% p.a.
1968	117	—
1975	111	−0.75%
1982	141	+3.48%
1990	165	+1.98%
1999	146	−1.35%
2007	205	+4.33%
2012	220	+1.42%
2017	211	−0.83%
2023	165	−4.02%
Source: INSEE

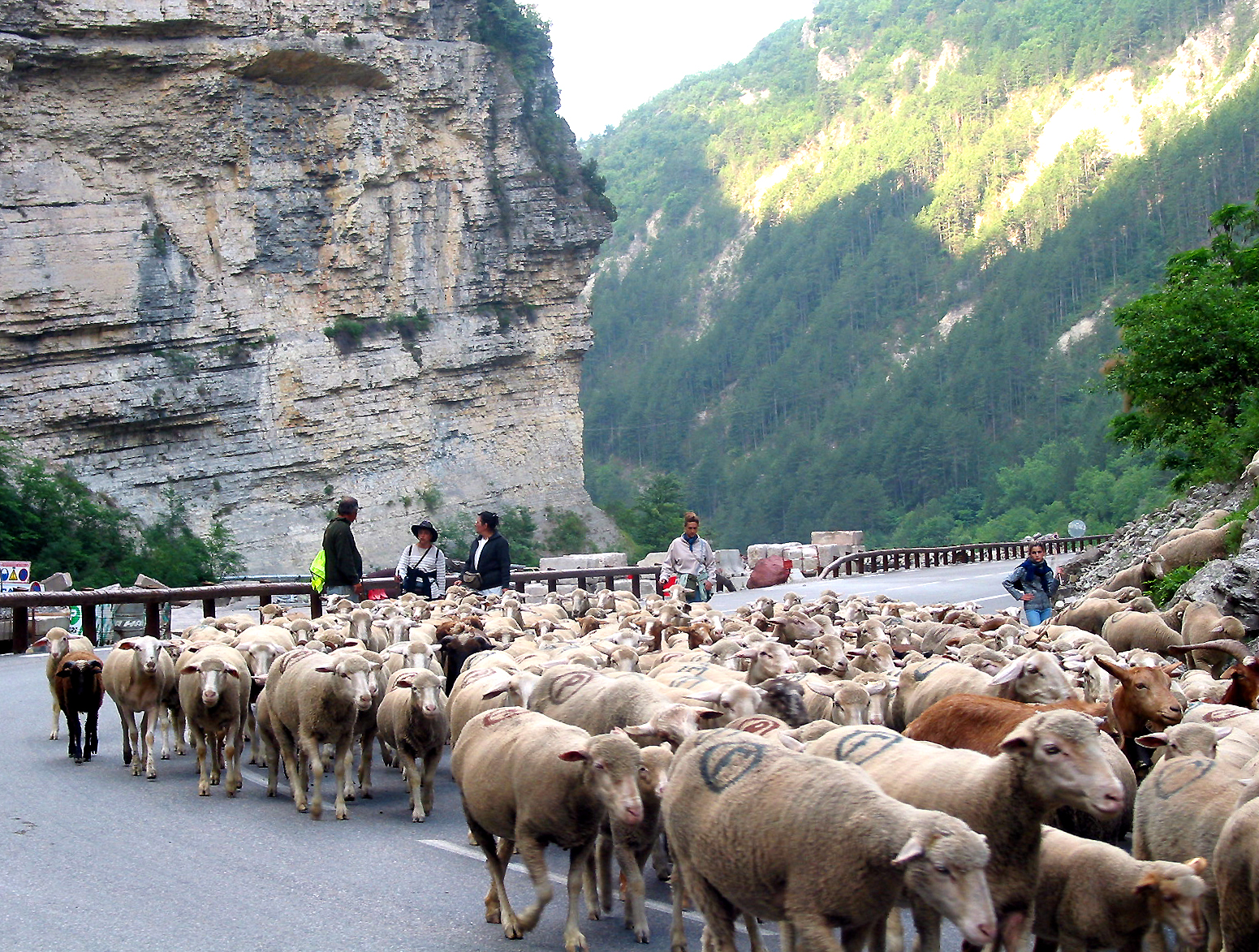
In the gorges du Cians.

== See also ==
- Communes of the Alpes-Maritimes department
