= Gorges de Daluis =

Canyon in France

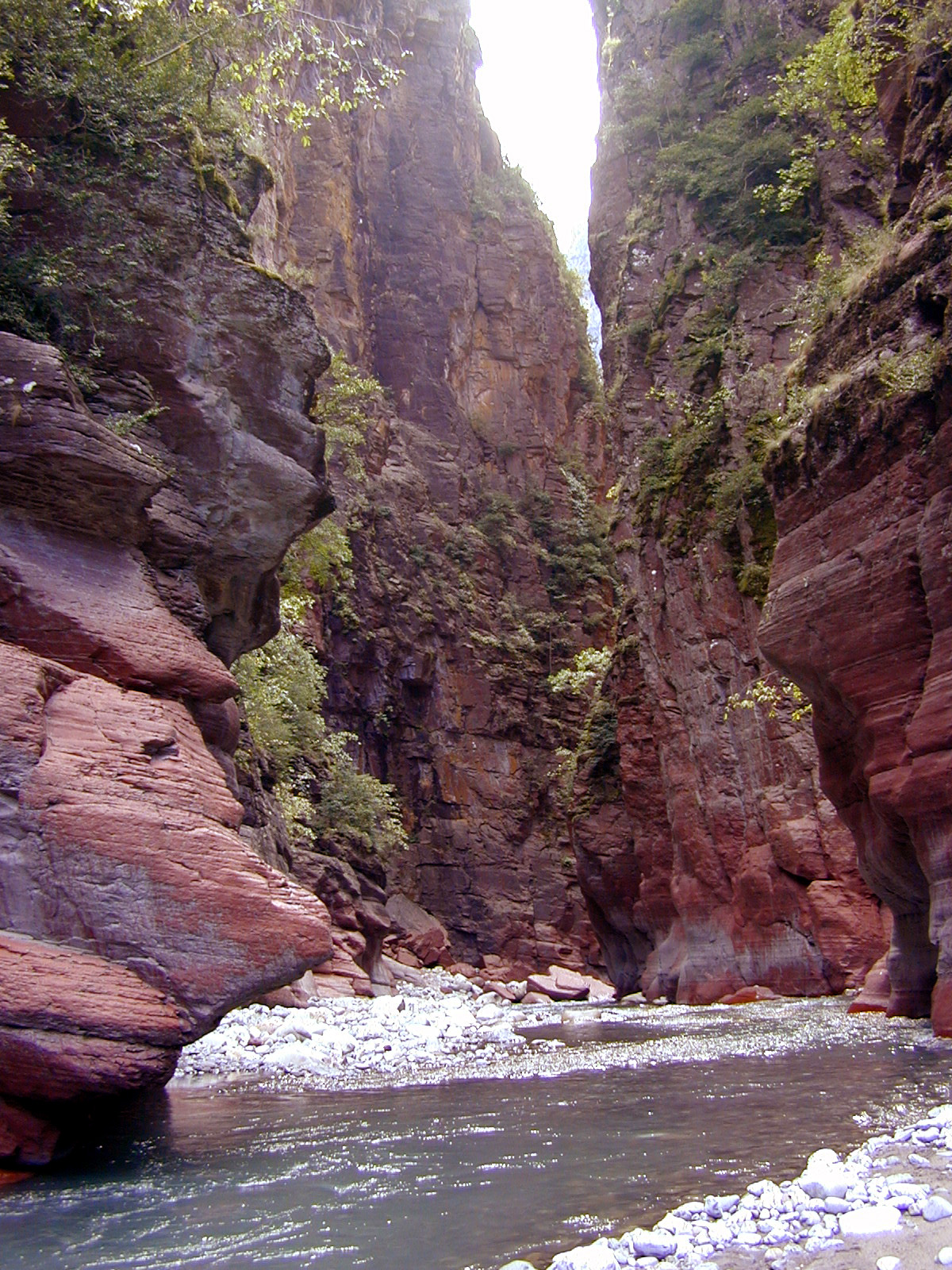
Gorges de Daluis

The Gorges de Daluis is a 6 km (3.7 mi)-long canyon formed by the river Var in the Alpes-Maritimes department in southeastern France. It runs south from Guillaumes to Daluis.

== Geography ==
The canyon starts off at Guillaumes, running north to south, west of the Dôme de Barrot, and ends at the small commune of Daluis, where the Var widens. The 6-kilometer-long gorge is cut in the red rock (sandstone colored by iron oxide, 260 million years old) by the river Var. Notable views along the gorge (a touristic high point and one of a number of "long, lonely canyons" in the area) include the final waterfall of the Clue d'Amen.

== Geology and history ==
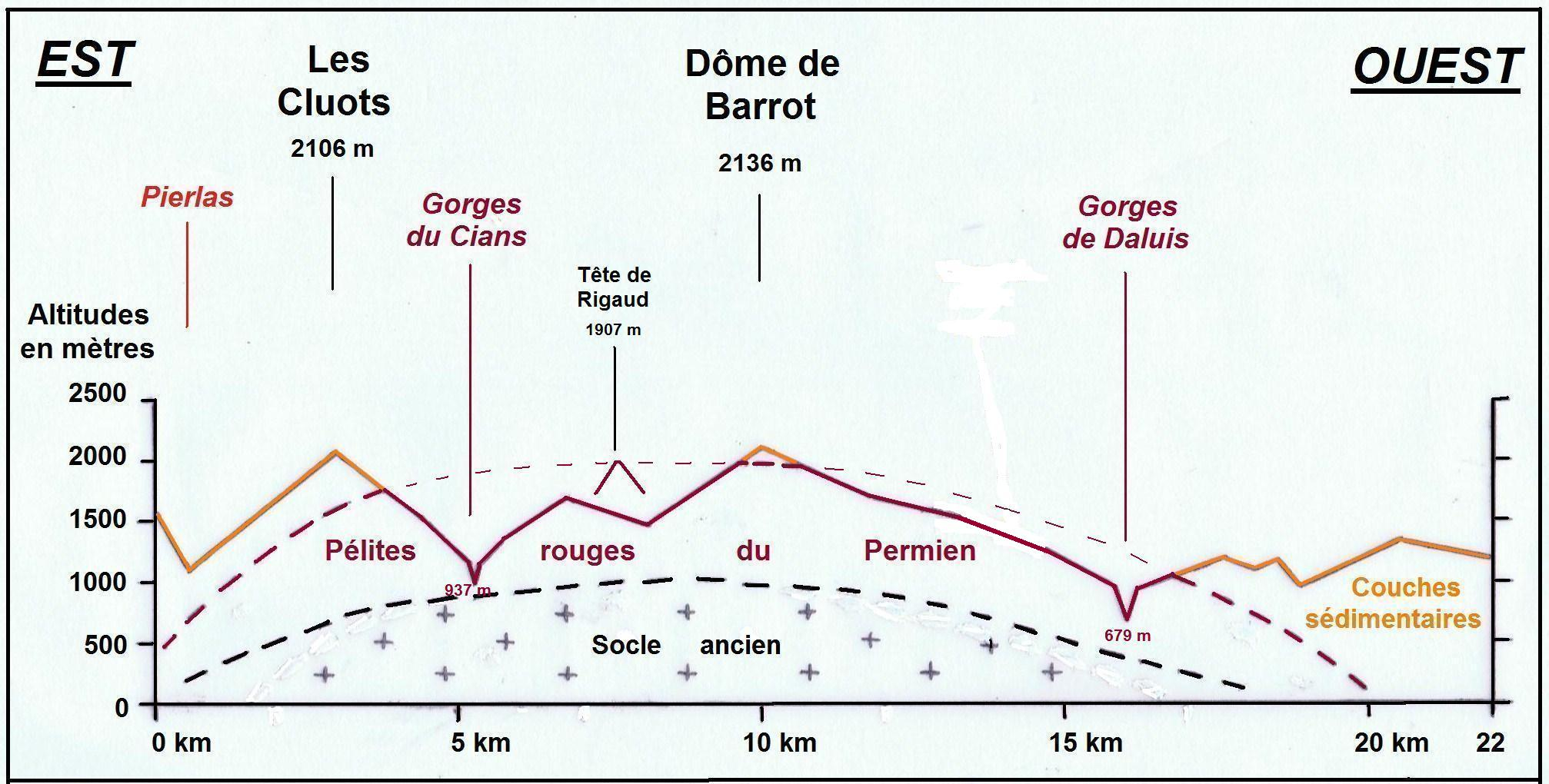
Geological overview of the area; Dôme de Barrot in center, Gorges de Daluis on right.

The area is dominated by the Dôme de Barrot, 2136 meters high, dating from the Permian. Former copper mining operations in the Dôme are still visible from the gorge, and unique mineral specimens have been found there.

During the Beuil-Guillaumes insurrection of July–August 1944, the Pont de Berthéou was one of two bridges blown up by the French resistance in July 1944 (the Pont du Pra d'Astier on 7 July, the Pont de Berthéou the following day) in an attempt to halt German troops advancing toward Guillaumes.

== Environment and tourism ==
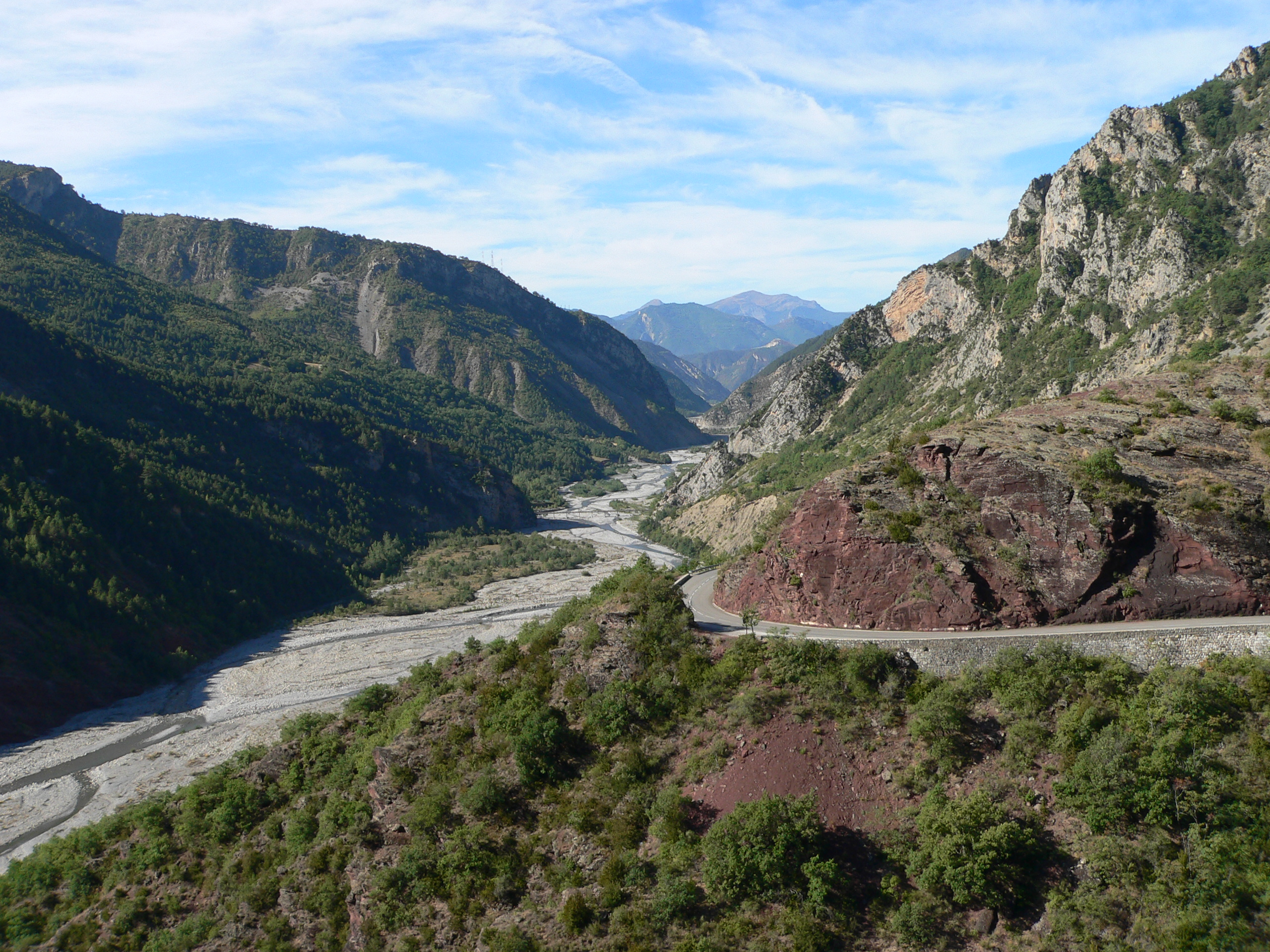
Looking north from the Var valley into the gorge.

South from Guillaumes, the D902/D2202 runs on the west side of the gorge, with the southbound lane going through 17 tunnels. The (now defunct) Alpes-Maritimes railroad line from Pont-de-Gueydan to Guillaumes, inaugurated in 1923, runs east from Guillaumes and crosses the gorge at the Pont de la Mariée, spanning 58 meters. Bungee jumping is done from the 80-meter-high bridge. Other notable sights include the Tête de la Femme, a rock formation resembling a woman's head on the west side of the road, just north of the Pont de Berthéou, and the gorge is a popular destination for rafting and canoeing. The road along the gorge lends itself to motorcycle and bicycle tourism.

== Gallery ==
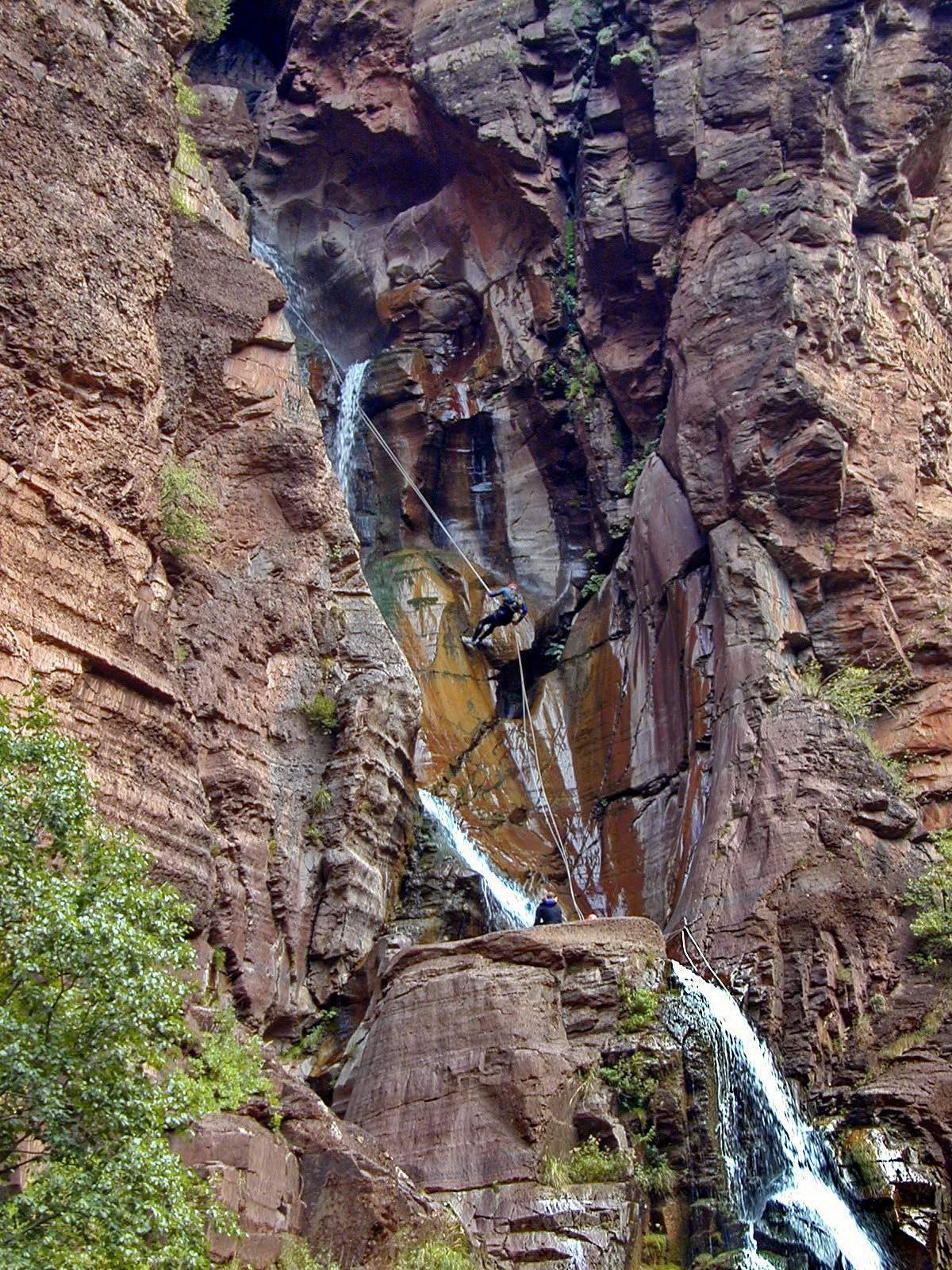
Canyoners descend the final waterfall of the Clue d'Amen

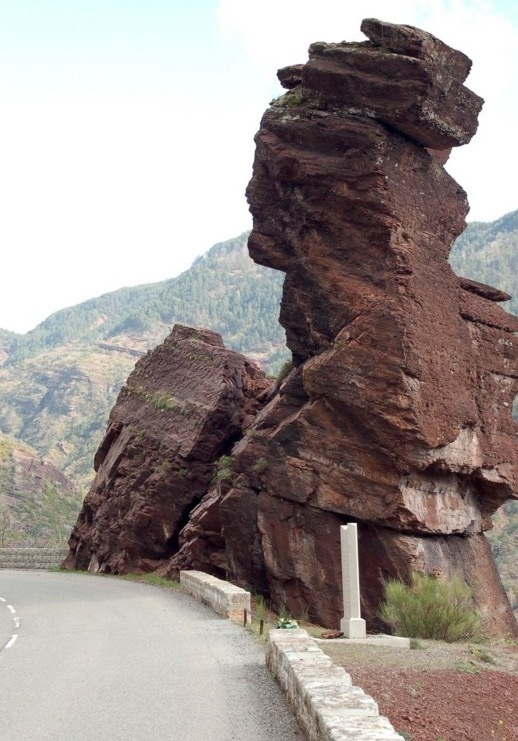
Tête de femme, famous pareidolia also known as La Gardienne des Gorges

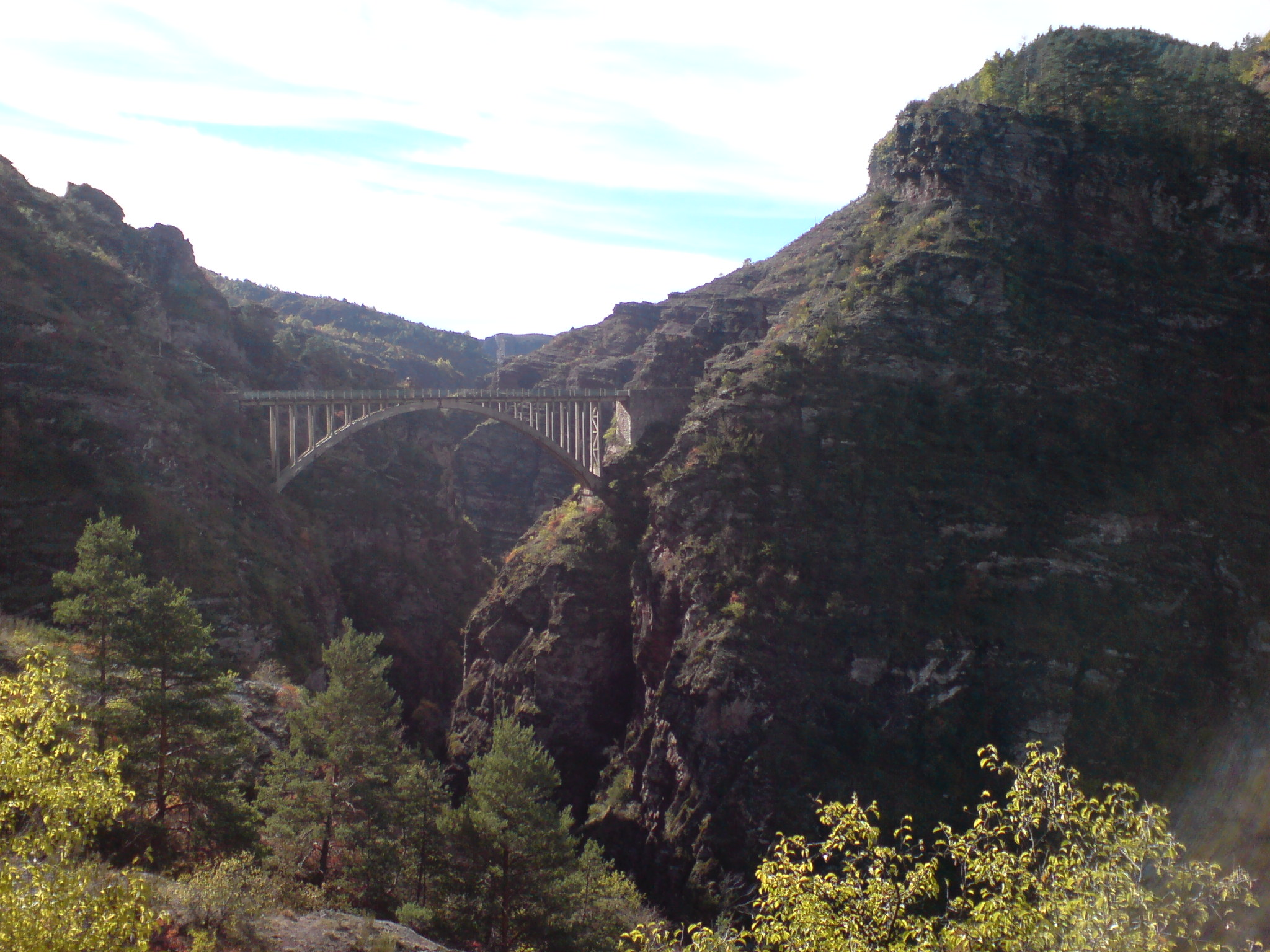
Pont de la Mariée

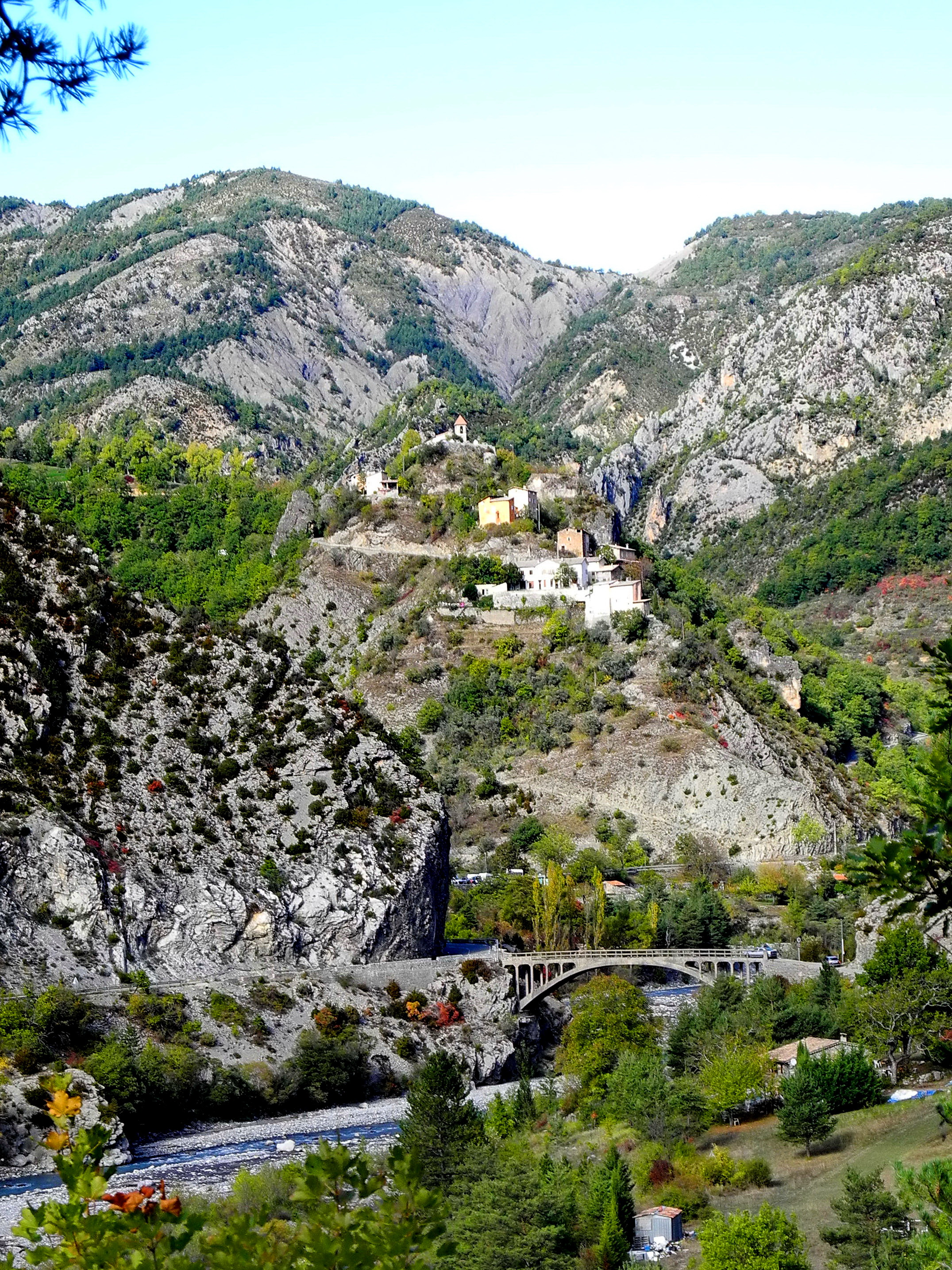
The commune of Daluis

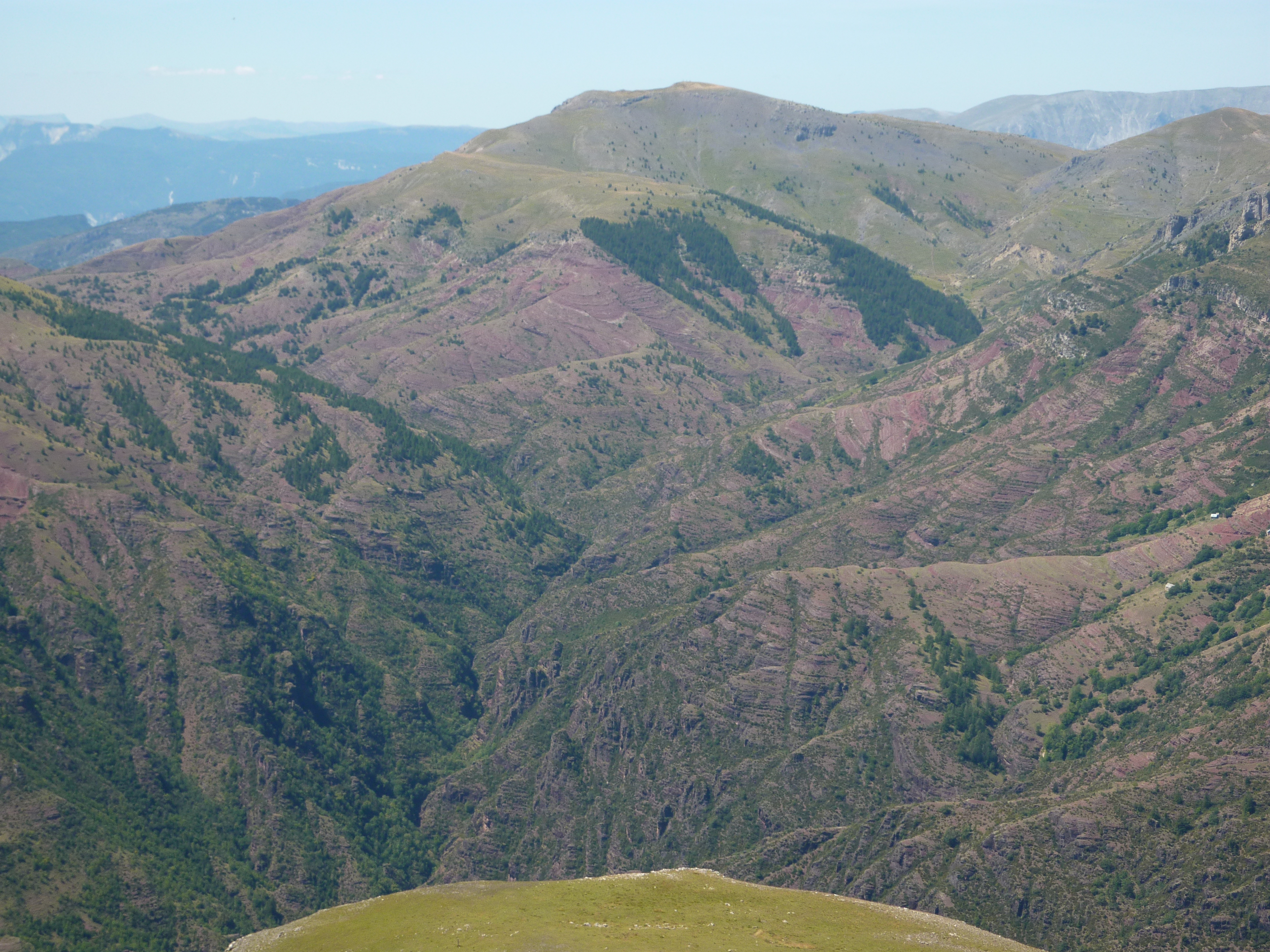
Dôme de Barrot
