= Chalvagne =

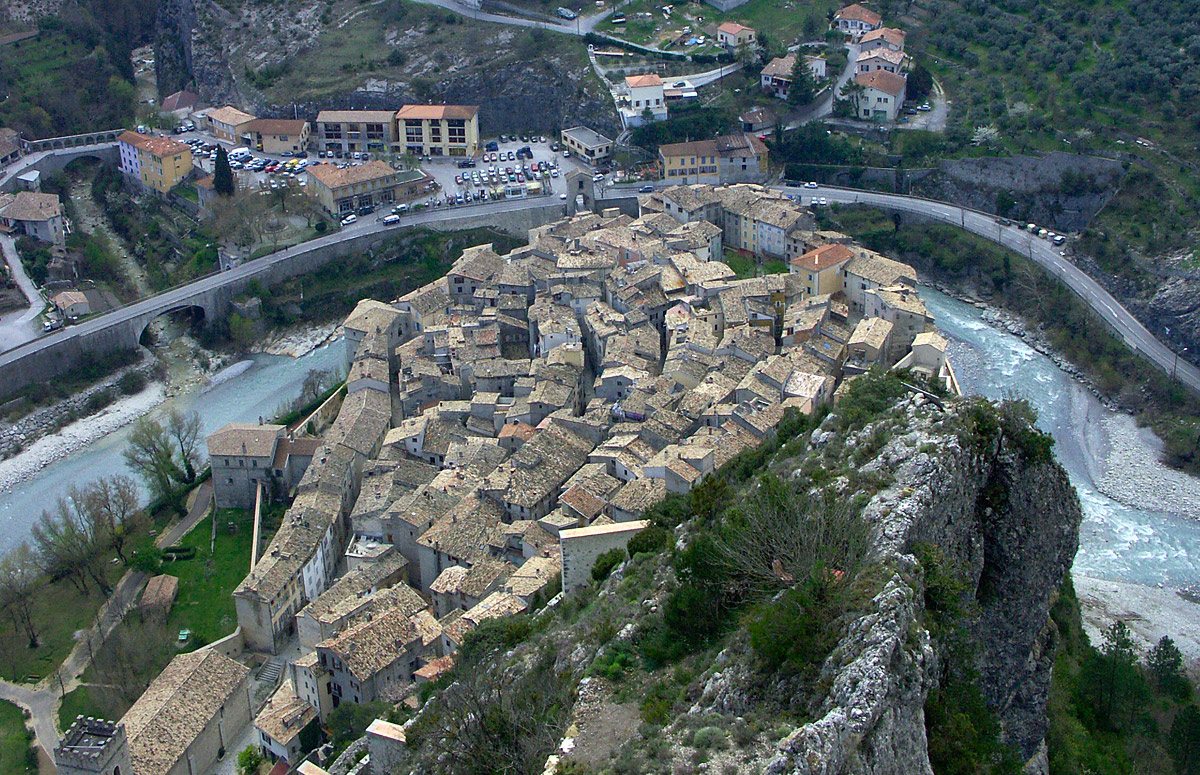

- Location within France Location within Provence-Alpes-Côte d'Azur

Location
- Country: France

Physical characteristics
- Mouth
  - location: Var
  - coordinates: 43°56′57″N 6°48′41″E
- Length: 15 km (9 mi)

Basin features
- Progression: Var→ Mediterranean Sea

The Chalvagne (French pronunciation: [ʃalvaɲ]; Occitan: Chalvanha) is a mountain river that flows through the Alpes-de-Haute-Provence department of southeastern France. It is 15.1 km (9.4 mi) long. Its source is in Val-de-Chalvagne, and it flows into the Var in Entrevaux.
