= Daluis =

Commune in Provence-Alpes-Côte d'Azur, France

- Commune
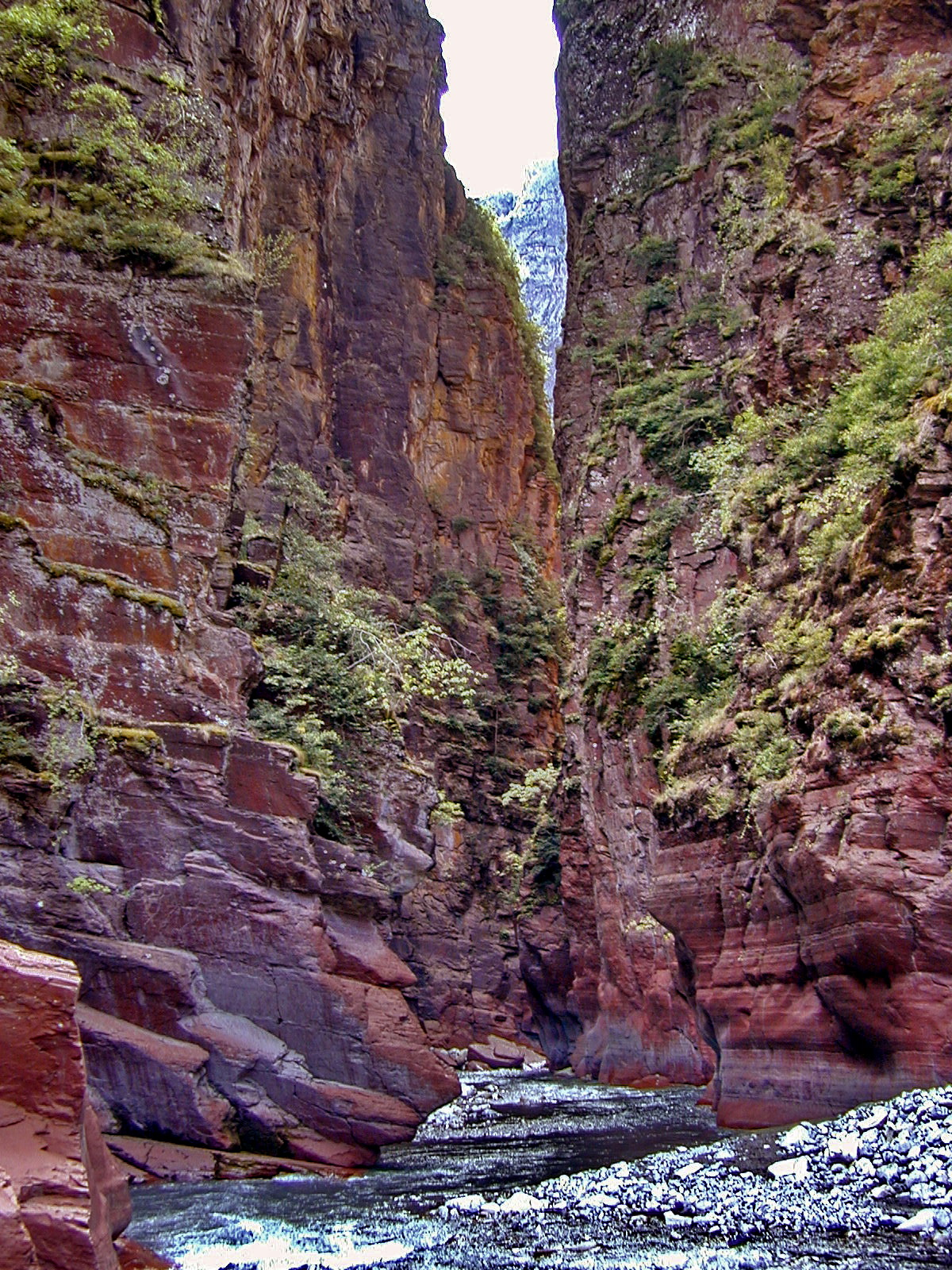
- Daluis Gorge of the Var

- Coat of arms
- Location of Daluis
- Location within France Location within Provence-Alpes-Côte d'Azur
- Coordinates: 44°01′28″N 6°48′36″E
- Country: France
- Region: Provence-Alpes-Côte d'Azur
- Department: Alpes-Maritimes
- Arrondissement: Nice
- Canton: Vence

Government
  - Mayor (2026–32): Guy Maunier
- Area^{1}: 40.03 km^{2} (15.46 sq mi)
- Elevation: 673 m (2,208 ft)
- Highest elevation: 2,502 m (8,209 ft)
- Lowest elevation: 590 m (1,940 ft)
- Population (2023): 147
  - Density: 3.67/km^{2} (9.51/sq mi)
- Time zone: UTC+01:00 (CET)
  - Summer (DST): UTC+02:00 (CEST)
- INSEE/Postal code: 06053 /06470
- ^{1} French Land Register data, which excludes lakes, ponds, glaciers > 1 km^{2} (0.386 sq mi or 247 acres) and river estuaries.

Daluis (Occitan: Daluèis) is a commune in the Alpes-Maritimes department in southeastern France. Situated on the river Var, it is the end point of the Gorges de Daluis.

== Population ==
Historical population
Year	Pop.	±% p.a.
1968	202	—
1975	185	−1.25%
1982	124	−5.56%
1990	110	−1.49%
1999	132	+2.05%
2007	115	−1.71%
2012	152	+5.74%
2017	146	−0.80%
2023	147	+0.11%
Source: INSEE

== See also ==
- Gorges de Daluis
- Communes of the Alpes-Maritimes department
