= Puget-Rostang =

Commune in Provence-Alpes-Côte d'Azur, France

- Commune
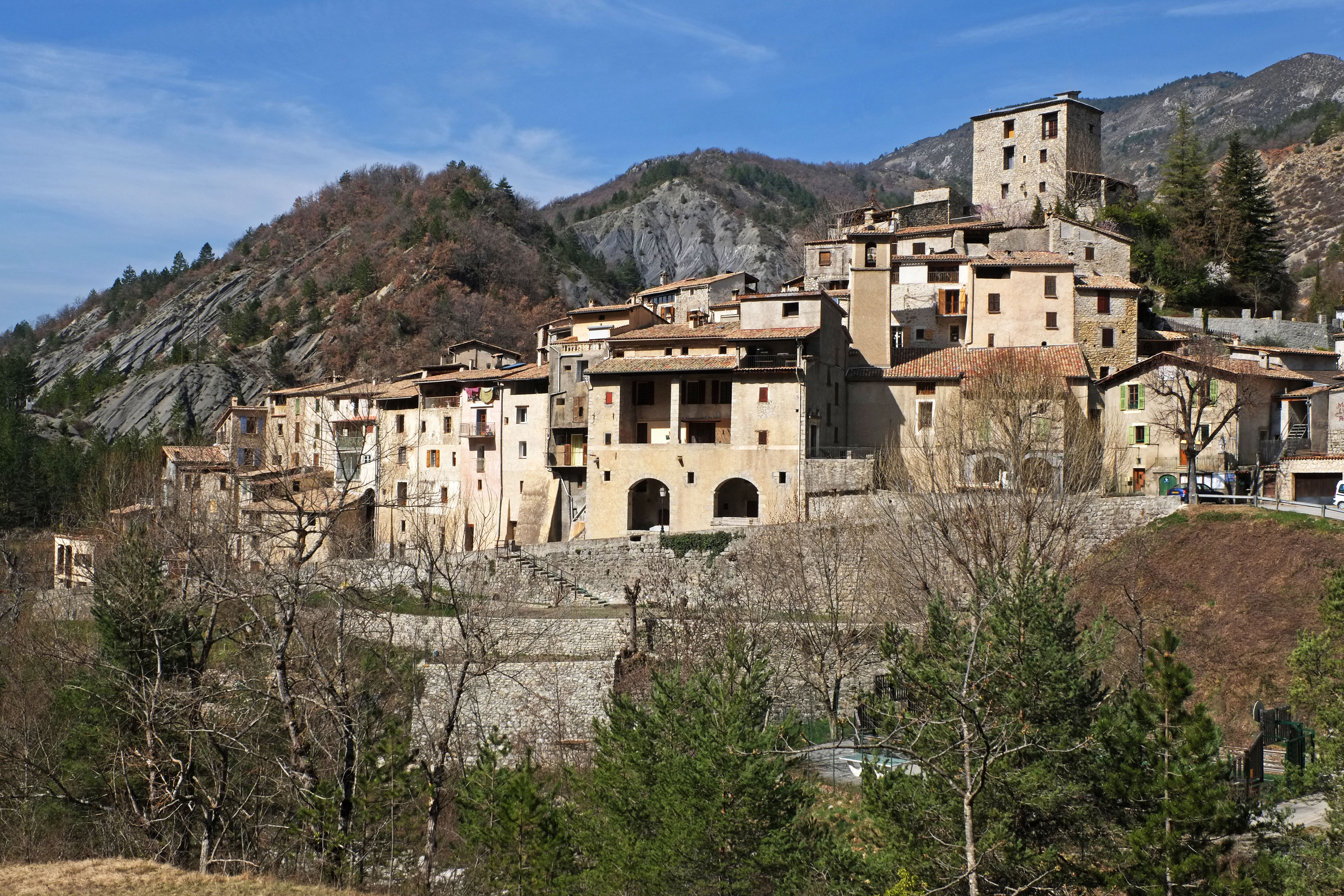
- A view of the village from the St Catherine path

- Coat of arms
- Location of Puget-Rostang
- Location within France Location within Provence-Alpes-Côte d'Azur
- Coordinates: 43°58′29″N 6°55′06″E
- Country: France
- Region: Provence-Alpes-Côte d'Azur
- Department: Alpes-Maritimes
- Arrondissement: Nice
- Canton: Vence

Government
  - Mayor (2026–32): Laurent Sanine-Sorokooumowsky
- Area^{1}: 22.46 km^{2} (8.67 sq mi)
- Elevation: 771 m (2,530 ft)
- Highest elevation: 1,738 m (5,702 ft)
- Lowest elevation: 537 m (1,762 ft)
- Population (2023): 116
  - Density: 5.16/km^{2} (13.4/sq mi)
- Time zone: UTC+01:00 (CET)
  - Summer (DST): UTC+02:00 (CEST)
- INSEE/Postal code: 06098 /06260
- ^{1} French Land Register data, which excludes lakes, ponds, glaciers > 1 km^{2} (0.386 sq mi or 247 acres) and river estuaries.

Puget-Rostang (French pronunciation: [pyʒɛ ʁɔstɑ̃]; Occitan: Lo Puget Rostanh; Italian: Poggetto Rostang) is a commune in the Alpes-Maritimes département in southeastern France.

== Geography ==
The commune is traversed by the Cianavelle and the Raton River.

It is located 70 km (43 mi) from Nice and 6 km (3.7 mi) from Puget-Théniers, seat of the canton.

The climate is Mediterranean, tempered by the 700 m (2,300 ft) altitude. Winters are brisk, but with no snow.

The village lies at the confluence of the Mairola and the Riou d’Auvare. The valley of the Mairola lies east and west and is dominated by the Mount Cimaillon (1514 m), which was topped by a castle.

== Economy ==
Until the middle of the 19th century, the village raised just enough to feed itself. Grain grew poorly in the rocky soil, and the vineyards only provided enough for family consumption. Each family had a few sheep and a couple of goats. The only notable product was prunes.

Since that time, artisanal products have dominated the economy. An eco-museum featuring tools and implements attracts visitors to the region.

== Population ==
Historical population
Year	Pop.	±% p.a.
1968	61	—
1975	70	+1.99%
1982	85	+2.81%
1990	115	+3.85%
1999	114	−0.10%
2007	107	−0.79%
2012	123	+2.83%
2017	129	+0.96%
2023	116	−1.75%
Source: INSEE

== See also ==
- Communes of the Alpes-Maritimes department
