= Coulomp =

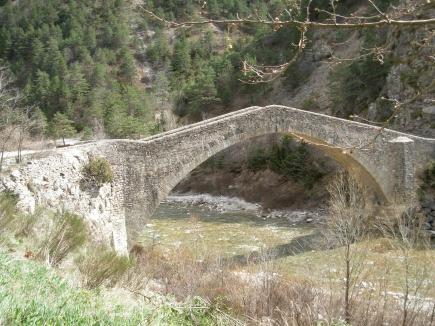
- Queen Jeanne Bridge over the Coulomp at Saint-Benoît

- Location within France Location within Provence-Alpes-Côte d'Azur

Location
- Country: France

Physical characteristics
- Mouth
  - location: Var
  - coordinates: 43°58′12″N 6°45′56″E
- Length: 20 km (12 mi)

Basin features
- Progression: Var→ Mediterranean Sea

The Coulomp is a mountain river that flows through the Alpes-de-Haute-Provence department of southeastern France. It is 20.3 km (12.6 mi) long. Its source is near the village Aurent, part of the commune Castellet-lès-Sausses. It flows into the Var in Saint-Benoît.
