= Ouvrage Fressinéa =

- Part of Maginot Line, Alpine Line
- Southeast France
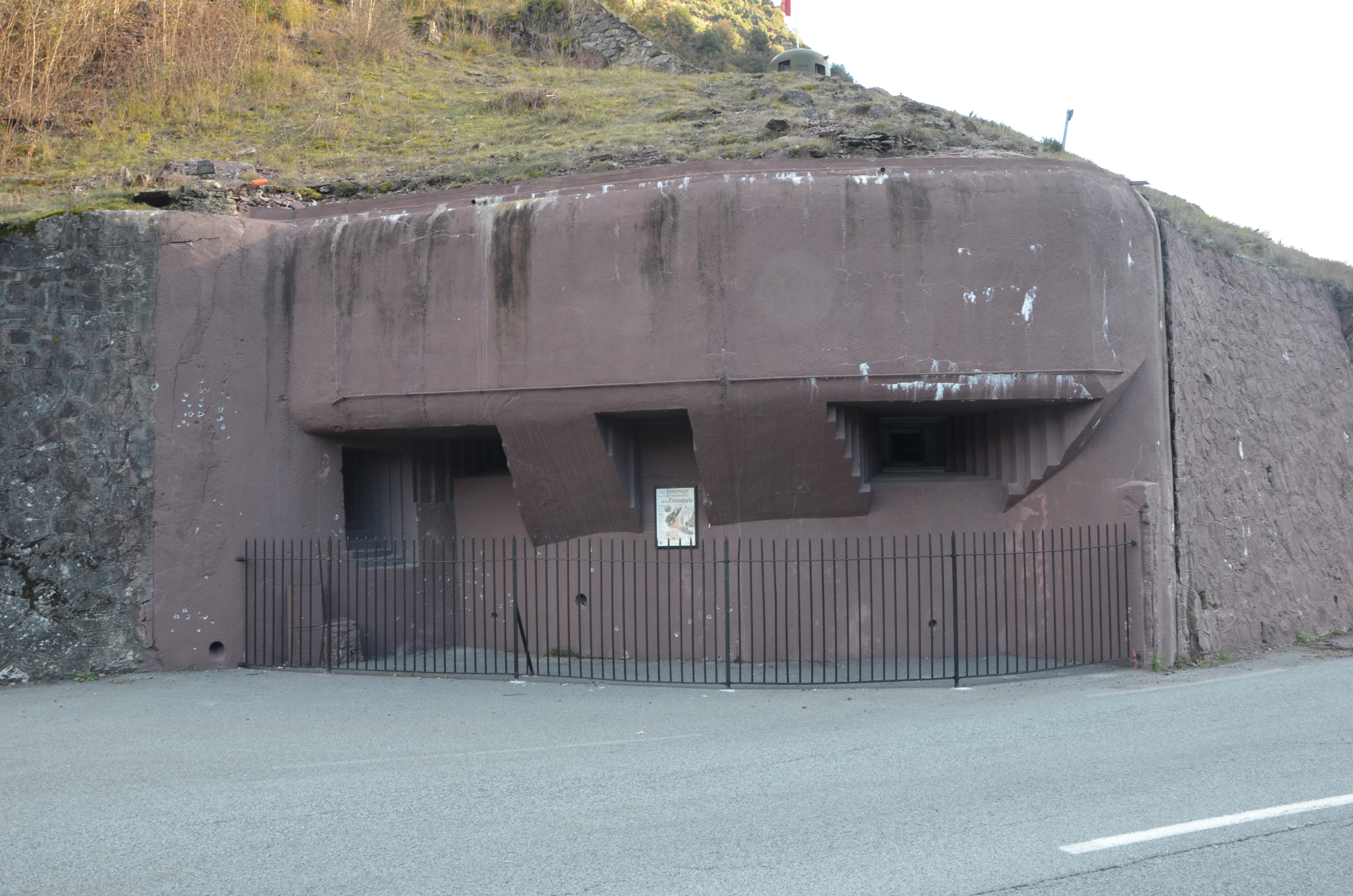

Site information
- Controlled by: France
- Open to the public: Yes

Location
- Location within France
- Coordinates: 44.06314°N 7.11731°E

Site history
- Built by: CORF
- In use: Preserved
- Materials: Concrete, steel, rock excavation
- Battles/wars: Italian invasion of France

Ouvrage Fressinéa, also known as Fraisinéa or Frassinéa, is a lesser work (petit ouvrage) of the Maginot Line's Alpine extension, the Alpine Line. The ouvrage consists of one entry block, one infantry block and one observation block at an altitude of 482 metres (1,581 ft). It is associated with the gros ouvrage of Rimplas, the first Maginot fortification to be constructed anywhere. Fressinéa was built between November 1930 and April 1934, accommodating 30 soldiers under a lieutenant with two months of provisions. The initial contractor was Pioljeux. Construction was finished by Thorrand et Cie for 1.7 million francs.

== Description ==
- Block 1 (entry): one machine gun embrasure.
- Block 2 (observation): one machine gun embrasure.
- Block 3 (infantry): one heavy twin machine gun embrasure and one heavy machine gun/47mm anti-tank gun embrasure.

Fressinéa is located on the D2205 road along the Tinée river. The post controls movement along the road and valley towards Nice.

Fressinéa was held by the French Army until 1970 when it was sold to the commune of Rimplas. The fort is under the care of Les amis de l'ouvrage Maginot de la Frassiné. It is open to the public in spring, summer and fall months.

== See also ==
- List of Alpine Line ouvrages

== Bibliography ==
- Allcorn, William. The Maginot Line 1928-45. Oxford: Osprey Publishing, 2003. ISBN 1-84176-646-1
- Kaufmann, J.E. and Kaufmann, H.W. Fortress France: The Maginot Line and French Defenses in World War II, Stackpole Books, 2006. ISBN 0-275-98345-5
- Kaufmann, J.E., Kaufmann, H.W., Jancovič-Potočnik, A. and Lang, P. The Maginot Line: History and Guide, Pen and Sword, 2011. ISBN 978-1-84884-068-3
- Mary, Jean-Yves; Hohnadel, Alain; Sicard, Jacques. Hommes et Ouvrages de la Ligne Maginot, Tome 1. Paris, Histoire & Collections, 2001. ISBN 2-908182-88-2 (in French)
- Mary, Jean-Yves; Hohnadel, Alain; Sicard, Jacques. Hommes et Ouvrages de la Ligne Maginot, Tome 4 - La fortification alpine. Paris, Histoire & Collections, 2009. ISBN 978-2-915239-46-1 (in French)
- Mary, Jean-Yves; Hohnadel, Alain; Sicard, Jacques. Hommes et Ouvrages de la Ligne Maginot, Tome 5. Paris, Histoire & Collections, 2009. ISBN 978-2-35250-127-5 (in French)
