= Auvare =

Commune in Provence-Alpes-Côte d'Azur, France

Auvare Auvara (Occitan)
- Commune
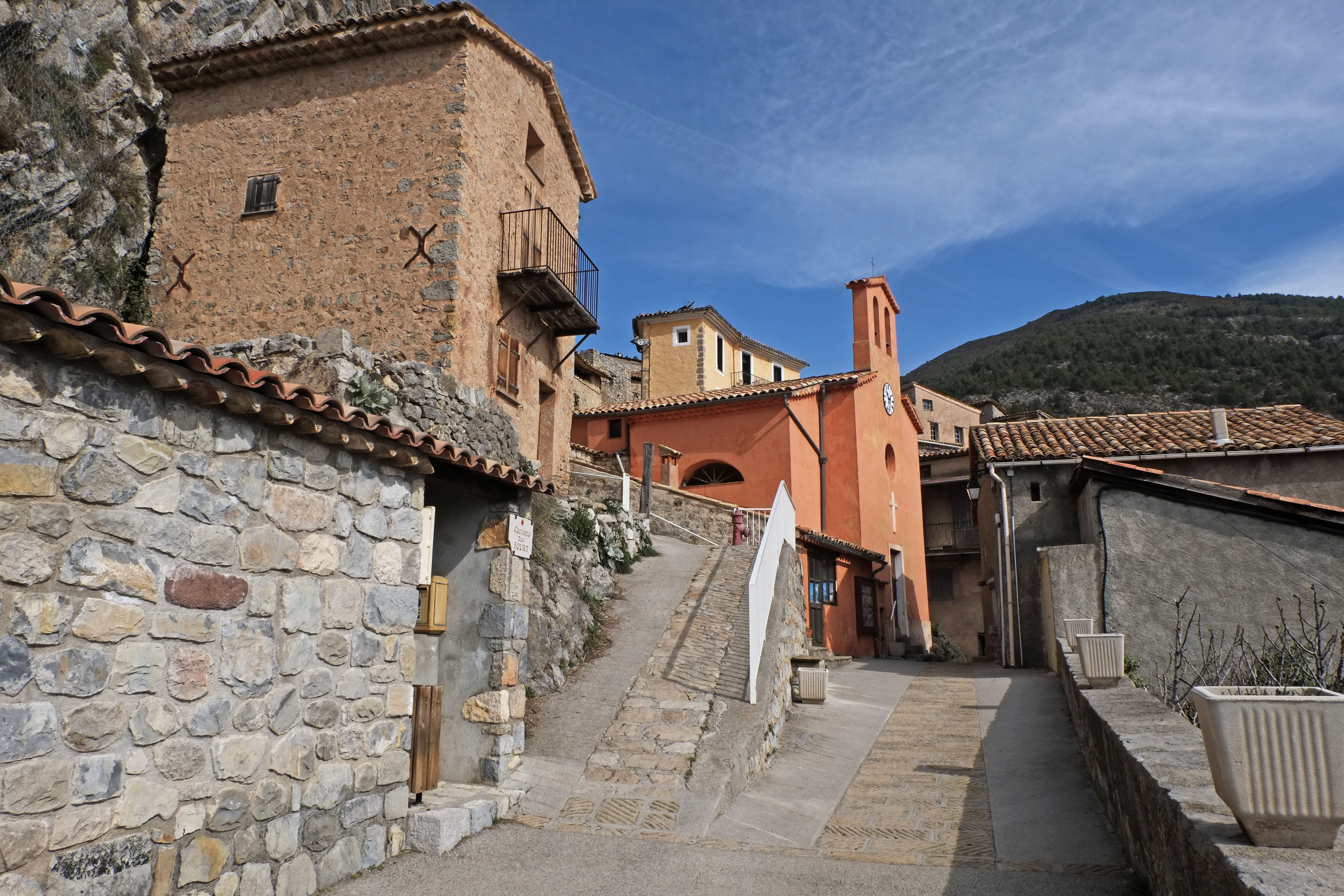
- View of the Village

- Coat of arms
- Location of Auvare
- Location within France Location within Provence-Alpes-Côte d'Azur
- Coordinates: 43°59′20″N 6°54′32″E
- Country: France
- Region: Provence-Alpes-Côte d'Azur
- Department: Alpes-Maritimes
- Arrondissement: Nice
- Canton: Vence
- Intercommunality: Alpes d'Azur

Government
  - Mayor (2026–32): Bernadette Jourdan
- Area^{1}: 18.27 km^{2} (7.05 sq mi)
- Elevation: 1,100 m (3,600 ft)
- Highest elevation: 2,133 m (6,998 ft)
- Lowest elevation: 479 m (1,572 ft)
- Population (2023): 52
  - Density: 2.8/km^{2} (7.4/sq mi)
- Demonym: Auvarois
- Time zone: UTC+01:00 (CET)
  - Summer (DST): UTC+02:00 (CEST)
- INSEE/Postal code: 06008 /06260
- ^{1} French Land Register data, which excludes lakes, ponds, glaciers > 1 km^{2} (0.386 sq mi or 247 acres) and river estuaries.

Auvare (French pronunciation: [ovaʁ]; Occitan and Italian: Auvara) is a commune in the Alpes-Maritimes department in the Provence-Alpes-Côte d'Azur region of south-eastern France.

== Geography ==
Auvare is located some 45 km north-east of Nice (in a direct line) and 6 km north-east of Puget-Théniers in the heart of the Alps. Access to the commune is by the D16 road from Puget-Theniers which passes through the far south of the commune and continues, changing its designation to D316, to join the D2202 just south of Daluis. Access to the village in the centre of the commune is by a small local road which branches from the D16 in the south of the commune and follows a tortuous and long route to the village. There is also an equally tortuous route going west from the village which eventually meets the D316 west of the commune. Apart from the village there is the hamlet of Les Vignes towards the south. The terrain of the commune is alpine and very rugged with no apparent farmland.

Numerous waterways rise in the commune and flow generally south-west including the Roudoule which forms the north-western border, the Vallon du Serre Long, the Vallon de Mous which flows east to the commune boundary where it joins an unnamed stream which flows north-east and forms the north-eastern border, the Ravin de Peichal flows north to join the same stream, and the Vallon d'Auvare with many tributaries which rises north of the village and flows south through the village continuing south to join the Torrent de Mayola.

== History ==
After the Roman conquest (which was completed in 14 BC), Augustus organized the Alps into provinces. The territory of the present commune of Auvare was part of the province of Alpes Maritimae which was attached to the civitas of Glanate (Glandevès). In late antiquity the Diocese of Glandevès defined the limits of this civitas.

The Roudoule Valley was conquered by the French Revolutionary Army in October 1792. The region was annexed by the decree of 31 January 1793 and confirmed by the Treaty of Paris (1796). The French Revolution was apparently well received since a Liberty Tree was planted and remained until the Restoration of the Savoyard State in 1814. The Savoyards hastened to levy taxes bringing a new upheaval to the Auvare community.

=== Heraldry ===
Arms of Auvare	Blazon: Gules, in chief of Or.

== Administration ==
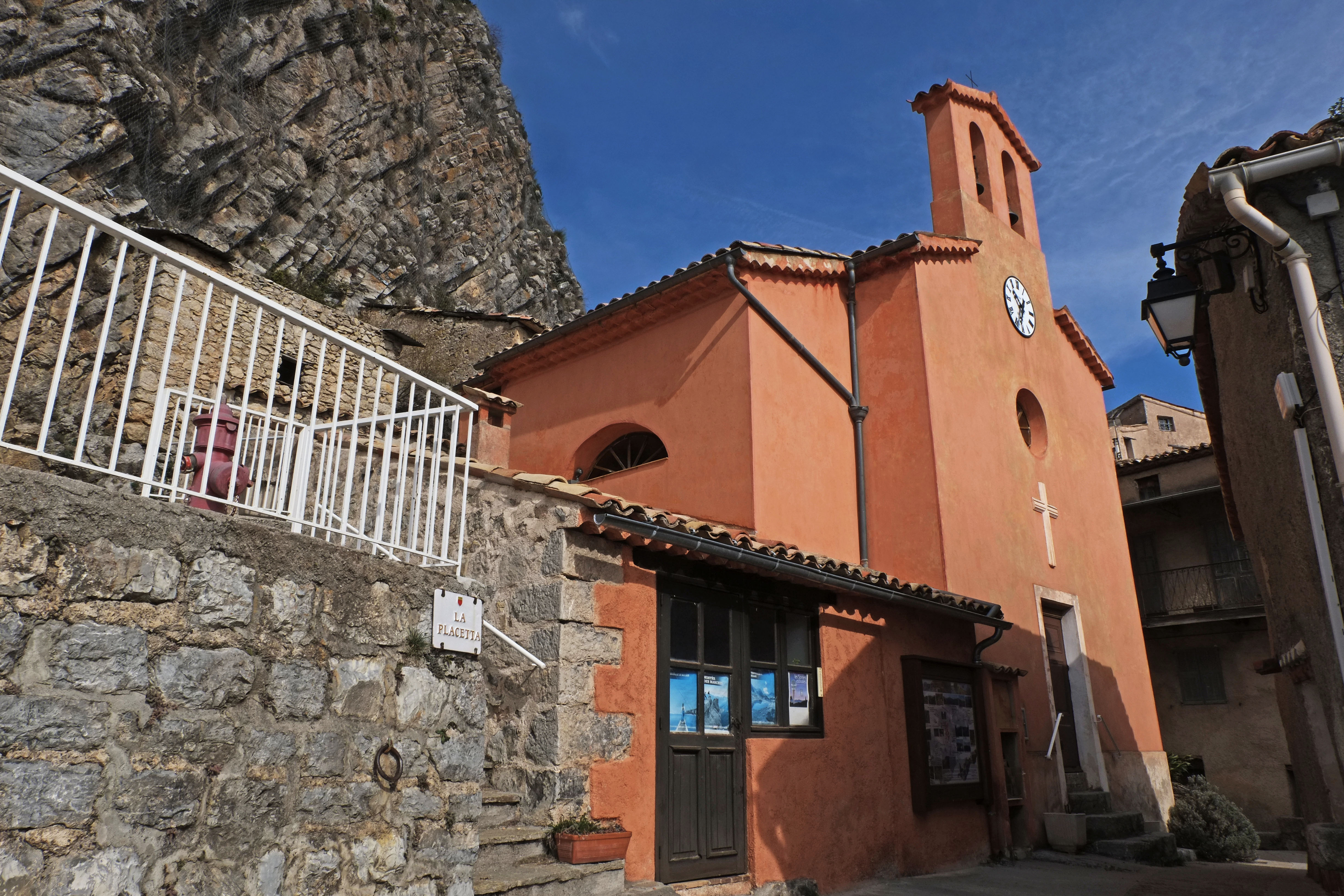
The church at Auvare

List of Successive Mayors

From	To	Name	Party
1892	1892	Antonin Ravel	
1892	1900	François Dalmas	
1900	1912	Antoine Baud	
1912	1919	Séraphin Baret	
1919	1925	Paul Laugier	
1925	1943	Jules Baud	
1943	1947	Félix Martin	
1947	1953	Charles Marius Lions	
1953	1977	Marcel Jourdan	
1977	2008	Clément Jourdan	DVD
2008	2020	Bernadette Jourdan	
2020	2026	Bernadette Drogoul	DVD
2026	Current	Bernadette Jourdan	

Since 1 January 2014 Auvare has been part of the Community of communes of Alpes d'Azur. It was previously a member of the Community of communes des vallées d'Azur until this disappeared during the implementation of a new departmental plan for inter-communal cooperation.

== Population ==
The inhabitants of the commune are known as Auvarois or Auvaroises in French.

Historical population
Year	Pop.	±% p.a.
1968	13	—
1975	14	+1.06%
1982	36	+14.44%
1990	37	+0.34%
1999	44	+1.94%
2007	54	+2.59%
2012	45	−3.58%
2017	31	−7.18%
2023	52	+9.00%
Source: INSEE

== Economy ==
The main economic resource is sheep farming.

== See also ==
- Communes of the Alpes-Maritimes department

=== Bibliography ===
- Yves Bernard, Tourist and Cultural Annual for Alpes-Maritimes and Monaco, p. 459, Éditions Campanile, 1997 ISBN 2912366-003 (in French)
