= Guillaumes =

Commune in Provence-Alpes-Côte d'Azur, France

- Commune
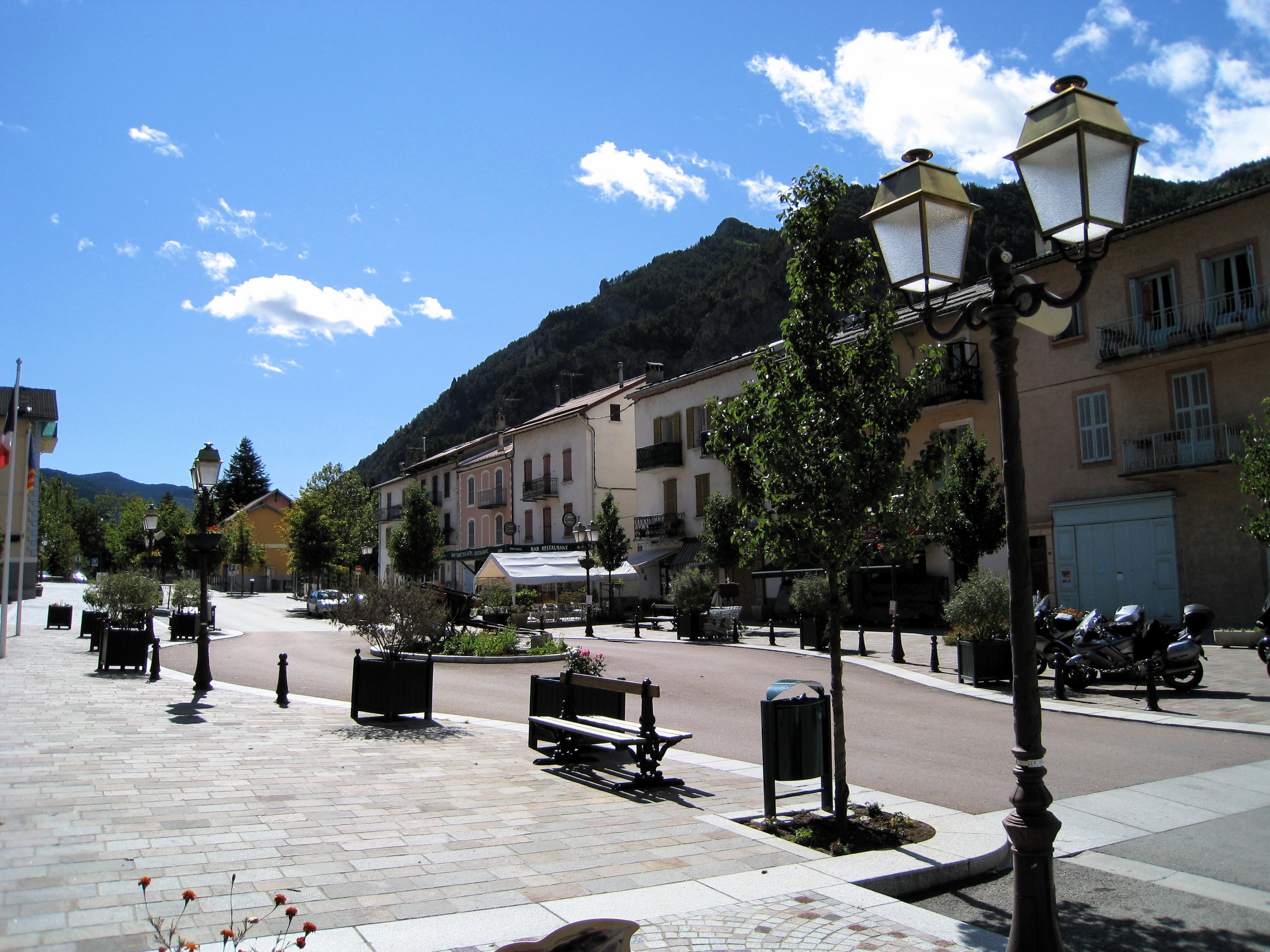
- A view within Guillaumes

- Coat of arms
- Location of Guillaumes
- Location within France Location within Provence-Alpes-Côte d'Azur
- Coordinates: 44°05′29″N 6°51′15″E
- Country: France
- Region: Provence-Alpes-Côte d'Azur
- Department: Alpes-Maritimes
- Arrondissement: Nice
- Canton: Vence
- Intercommunality: Alpes d'Azur

Government
  - Mayor (2026–32): Jean-Paul David
- Area^{1}: 87.02 km^{2} (33.60 sq mi)
- Elevation: 792 m (2,598 ft)
- Highest elevation: 2,582 m (8,471 ft)
- Lowest elevation: 679 m (2,228 ft)
- Population (2023): 587
  - Density: 6.75/km^{2} (17.5/sq mi)
- Time zone: UTC+01:00 (CET)
  - Summer (DST): UTC+02:00 (CEST)
- INSEE/Postal code: 06071 /06470
- ^{1} French Land Register data, which excludes lakes, ponds, glaciers > 1 km^{2} (0.386 sq mi or 247 acres) and river estuaries.

Guillaumes (French pronunciation: [ɡijom]; Occitan: Guilherme; Italian: Guglielmi) is a commune in the Alpes-Maritimes department in southeastern France.

It was part of the historic County of Nice until 1860 as Guglielmi.

The Valberg ski resort is, in part, located on this town.

== Geography ==
The commune is situated along the river Var, and at the beginning of the Gorges de Daluis.

== Population ==
Historical population
Year	Pop.	±% p.a.
1968	594	—
1975	558	−0.89%
1982	546	−0.31%
1990	533	−0.30%
1999	589	+1.12%
2007	699	+2.16%
2012	689	−0.29%
2017	631	−1.74%
2023	587	−1.20%
Source: INSEE

== See also ==
- Communes of the Alpes-Maritimes department
