= Var (river) =

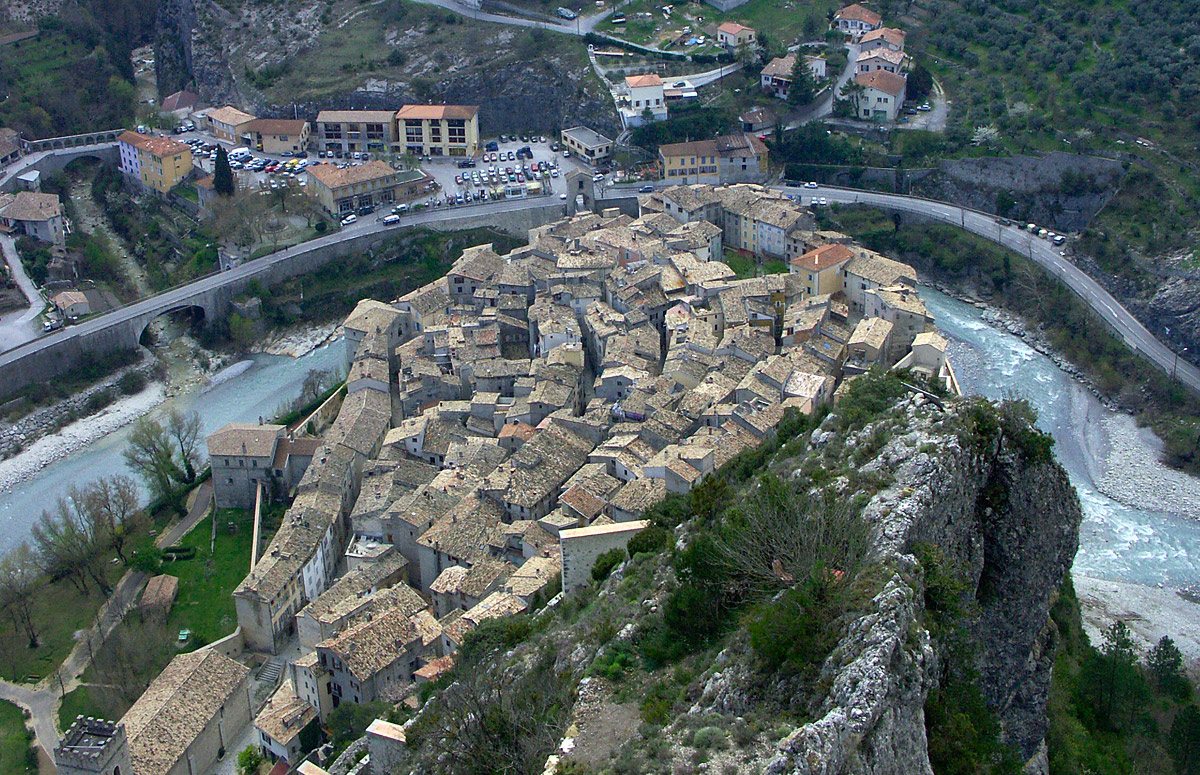
- Rooftops of Entrevaux and the gorge of the Var

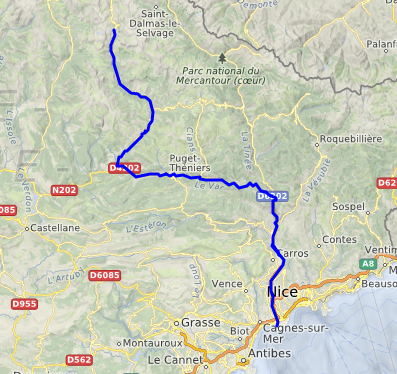

Location
- Country: France

Physical characteristics
- Source
  - location: Maritime Alps
  - elevation: 1,800 m (5,900 ft)
- Mouth
  - location: Mediterranean Sea
  - coordinates: 43°39′13″N 7°11′59″E
- Length: 114 km (71 mi)
- Basin size: 2,812 km^{2} (1,086 mi^{2})
- Discharge
  - average: 50 to 100 m^{3}/s (1,800 to 3,500 cu ft/s)

The Var (French: [vaʁ], Occitan: [ˈbaɾ]; Italian: Varo; Latin: Varus) is a river located in the southeast of France. It is 114 km (71 mi) long. Its drainage basin is 2,812 km^{2} (1,086 sq mi).

The Var flows through the Alpes-Maritimes département for most of its length, with a short (~15 km or ~9 mi) stretch in the Alpes-de-Haute-Provence département. It is a unique case in France of a river not flowing in the département named after it (see Var). This is the result of the Nice Préfecture being too small to be considered a département by itself in the administrative reshuffling of 1860. Hence, some land had to be taken out of neighbouring Var region causing the eponymous département to lose its namesake.

Until the beginning of the 19th century, the river had no bridges; it was the border between France and the County of Nice, then part of Kingdom of Piedmont-Sardinia.

== Name ==
The river name is attested in Latin as Vārus and in Ancient Greek as Ouãros (Οὐᾶρος). It stems from the Indo-European root *uōr- (earlier *uer-), meaning 'water, river' (cf. Sanskrit vār, Old Norse vari).

== Hydrography ==
The Var rises near the Col de la Cayolle (2,326 m/7,631 ft), located in the Parc National du Mercantour in the Maritime Alps.The river flows generally southeast to its outflow into the Mediterranean Sea between Nice and Saint-Laurent-du-Var. Its main tributaries are the Cians, the Tinée, the Vésubie, the Coulomp, the Estéron, the Tuébi, the Chalvagne, the Barlatte, the Bourdous and the Roudoule.

The Var flows through the following départements and towns:

- Alpes-Maritimes: Guillaumes
- Alpes-de-Haute-Provence: Entrevaux
- Alpes-Maritimes: Puget-Théniers, Carros, Saint-Laurent-du-Var
